= Canadian Screen Music Awards =

Canadian music award

The Canadian Screen Music Awards are a Canadian award, launched in 2022 by the Screen Composers Guild of Canada to honour achievements in musical composition for film, television and digital media.

Nominees for the inaugural awards were announced on August 16, 2022, with the awards presented on September 21. Nominations for the second awards were announced in September 2023, with the awards presented on October 26.

== Awards ==
=== 2022 ===
Best Original Score for a Children's Program or Series	Best Original Score for a Documentary Feature Film
Steffan Andrews, LEGO Marvel Avengers: Time Twisted; Caleb Chan and Brian Chan, Pinecone & Pony; Caleb Chan and Brian Chan, Team Zenko; Neil Parfitt, Matchbox Adventures; Neil Parfitt, Ranger Rob	Todor Kobakov, Artificial Immortality; Deanna H. Choi, The Nature of Things: "Last of the Right Whales"; Walker Grimshaw, Dear Audrey; Jonathan Kawchuk, The Nature of Things: "Carbon: The Unauthorized Biography"; Julien Verschooris, Coextinction
Best Original Score for Interactive Media	Best Original Main Title Theme Music
Janal Bechthold and La-Nai Gabriel, No Reason to Apologize: The Resilient Legacy of Viola Desmond; Felix Arifin, REM Cycles; Janal Bechthold, The Choice	Layal Watfeh, The Journey; Lora Bidner and Rob Carli, Ruby and the Well; Peter Chapman, The Communist's Daughter; Trevor Morris, Vikings: Valhalla; Layal Watfeh, Ambar 6
Best Original Score for a Narrative Feature Film	Best Original Score for a Non-Fiction Series or Limited Series
Steph Copeland, The Retreat; Spencer Creaghan, Motherly; Darren Fung, Cinema of Sleep; Steve London, The Immaculate Room; Nasser Sharaf, The Alleys	Todor Kobakov, The Unsolved Murder of Beverly Lynn Smith; Amanda Cawley, Ageless Gardens; Andrew Gordon Macpherson, Dark Side of the Ring; Christopher Nickel, Highway Thru Hell; Tom Third, BLK, An Origin Story
Best Original Score for a Series or Limited Series	Best Original Score for a Short Film
Trevor Morris, Vikings: Valhalla; Robert Carli, Frankie Drake Mysteries; Robert Carli and Peter Chapman, Wynonna Earp; Clinton Shorter, The Expanse; Tom Third, Coroner	Phil Strong, In the Wake of Progress; Jordan Andrew, Shadowlands; Adrian Ellis, Old Mother Tongue; Walker Grimshaw, Monkey-Love, Please Hold; Randolph Peters and Joshua Maikawa, Wrought
Best Original Score for a Television Special	SCGC Award for Distinguished Service to the Industry
Steph Copeland, Lethal Love; Suad Bushnaq, The Nature of Things: "Why We Dance"; Iva Delic, Todor Kobakov and Tika Simone, Faith Heist; Jim McGrath, The Nature of Things: "Curb Your Carbon"; Meiro Stamm and Antonio Naranjo, A Christmas Dance Reunion	Canadian Film Centre; Slaight Family Foundation

=== 2023 ===
Best Original Main Title Theme Music	Best Original Song
Layal Watfeh, Under Guardianship (Taht Al Wisaya); Brian Chan and Caleb Chan, Builder Brothers Dream Factory; Justin Delorme, Diaspora; Brian Kobayakawa, Jackals & Fireflies; Andrew Lockington, Mayor of Kingstown	Jesse Zubot, Wayne Lavallee and Marie Clements, "You Are My Bones" — Bones of Crows; Spencer Creaghan and Milen Petzelt Sorace, "My Little Pony Make Your Mark" — My Little Pony: Make Your Mark; Stephen Krecklo and Ashley Jane, "How Lucky Am I?" — Press Play; Alexandra Petkovski and Kris Kovacs, "Deathloop: Déja Vu Remix" — Deathloop; Craig McConnell, "The Bullet or The Blade" — Resident Evil 4
Best Original Score for an Animated Series or Special	Best Original Score for a Comedy Series or Special
Spencer Creaghan and Neil Parfitt, Matchbox Adventures: Season 3; Caleb Chan and Brian Chan, Pinecone & Pony: "The Sturdy Stone"; Peter Chapman, Happy House of Frightenstein: "Lucky Spell"; Neil Parfitt, Super Wish: "The Legend of Cake-Bun Bottom"; Erica Procunier, Thomas & Friends: All Engines Go: "The Mystery of Lookout Mountain"	Peter Chapman and Maylee Todd, Workin' Moms: "The End"; Peter Chapman, The Lake: "Midsommar Madness"; John Rowley, Pretty Hard Cases: "Always a Bridesmaid"
Best Original Score for a Documentary, Factual or Reality Series or Special	Best Original Score for a Documentary Feature Film
Ben Fox, The Climate Baby Dilemma; Peter Chapman, Cross Country Cake Off: "Holiday Finale"; Peter Chapman, Mary Makes It Easy: "Overnight Guests"; Justin Delorme, The Nature of Things: "Grizzly Rewild"; Andrew Gordon Macpherson, Tales from the Territories: "Andy Kaufman vs. The King of Memphis"	Jonathan Kawchuk, True Survivors; Mark Dolmont, Satan Wants You; Ben Fox, Cynara; Stéphanie Hamelin Tomala, I Lost My Mom (J'ai placé ma mère); Agatha Kasper, The Long Weekend
Best Original Score for a Dramatic Series or Special	Best Original Score for Games and Interactive Media
Spencer Creaghan, Slasher: Ripper: "The Slaughterhouse"; Lora Bidner and Rob Carli, Ruby and the Well: "I Wish the Well Would Let Us Be Forever"; Caleb Chan and Brian Chan, Panhandle: "Machetes Out"; Jeff Danna, Guillermo del Toro's Cabinet of Curiosities: "Graveyard Rats"; Ari Posner, Amin Bhatia and Joel Schwartz, Ride: "Speak Now or Forever Hold Your Peace"	Jim Guthrie, Nobody Saves the World; Janal Bechthold, Loki's Castle; Blake Matthews, Tiny Colony; Andrea Wettstein and Alec Harrison, Windborne: Call of the Canadian Rockies
Best Original Score for a Narrative Feature Film	Best Original Score for a Short Film
Steph Copeland, Outpost; Steph Copeland, Laced; Todor Kobakov, Brother; Michelle Osis, Fixation; Tom Third, The Young Arsonists	Amin Bhatia, Jane Goodall: Reasons for Hope; Suad Bushnaq, Corvine; Blake Matthews, Nahuales; Noora Nakhaei, Printemps; Daniela Pinto, Diaspora
Best Original Score for a Television Special	SCGC Award for Distinguished Service to the Industry
Kristjan Bergey, Swindler Seduction; Steph Copeland, Designing Christmas; Adrian Ellis, Love in Wolf Creek; Medhat Hanbali, Queen Rising; Sean Nimmons-Paterson and Stephen Krecklo, Hotel for the Holidays	Darren Fung

=== 2024 ===
Best Original Main Title Theme Music	Best Original Song
Jeff Toyne, Palm Royale; Suad Bushnaq, From the Ashes (Jaras Enzar); Allison Leyton-Brown and Laura Kleinbaum, Vida the Vet; Andrew Lockington, Special Ops: Lioness; Andrew Lockington, Poacher	Carmen Elle and Ben Kunder, Sort Of: "Sort Of Gone Again"; Paul Aitken, Murdoch Mysteries: "Why Is Everybody Singing?"; Steph Copeland and Sarah MacDougall, Cascade; Spencer Creaghan, Kirstyn Johnson and Bryn V. McCutcheon, SurrealEstate: "The Butler Didn't"; Alexandra Petkovski and Maks Simchenko, Black Skylands
Best Original Score for an Animated Series or Special	Best Original Score for a Comedy Series or Special
Amanda Cawley, Ostinato; Caleb Chan and Brian Chan, The Fairly OddParents: A New Wish: "Fly"; Erica Procunier, Thomas & Friends: "The Great Bubbly Build"; Henry Mitton, Vida the Vet: "Toby Needs Glasses"; Meiro Stamm, Carl's Rescue Crew: "Rumble Mountain"	Jeff Toyne, Palm Royale: "Maxine Saves a Cat"; Dillon Baldassero, Davey & Jonesie's Locker: "Bean and Nothingness"; Peter Chapman, The Lake: "Death on Denial"; David DeDourek, Space Janitors: "Til Death"; Joel Schwartz and Antoine Gratton, Paris Paris: "Mon coeur est dans l'enclos"
Best Original Score for a Documentary, Factual or Reality Series or Special	Best Original Score for a Documentary Feature Film
Suad Bushnaq, The Nature of Things: "Secret World of Sound: Hunters and Hunted"; Amanda Cawley, Visionary Gardeners: "Communities in Harmony"; Andrew Gordon Macpherson, Dark Side of the Ring: "Chris Colt: Welcome to My Nightmare"; Andy Milne, Black Life: Untold Stories: "Revolution Remix"; Julien Verschooris, The Passionate Eye: "Warrior Spirit"	Jonathan Kawchuk, Hunt for the Oldest DNA; Iva Delic, Lost in the Shuffle; Jonathan Kawchuk, Send Kelp!; Tom Third, A Mother Apart; Jesse Zubot and Josh Zubot, Resident Orca
Best Original Score for a Dramatic Series or Special	Best Original Score for Games and Interactive Media
Spencer Creaghan, SurrealEstate: "Trust the Process"; Paul Aitken, Robert Carli and Jono Grant, Murdoch Mysteries: "Why Is Everybody Singing?"; Lora Bidner and Robert Carli, Ruby and the Well: "I Wish I Knew Where It Was”; Andrew Lockington, Special Ops: Lioness: "Gone Is the Illusion of Order"; Jesse Zubot and Wayne Lavallee, Bones of Crows: "To Be Separated"	Amanda Cawley, Siegebreaker; Janal Bechthold and La-Nai Gabriel, Where the Poppies Blow: The Life and Lessons of John McCrae; Maxime Goulet, One More Gate: A Wakfu Legend
Best Original Score for a Narrative Feature Film	Best Original Score for a Short Film
Adrian Ellis and Walker Grimshaw, Mother Father Sister Brother Frank; Steph Copeland, Cascade; Steph Copeland, Reveillon; Spencer Creaghan, I Don't Know Who You Are; Andrew Lockington, Atlas	Anthony William Wallace, Borders; Justin Delorme, Ohskennón:ten Owí:ra; Meiro Stamm, Fiego and the Magic Fish; Tom Third, EarthWorm; Tom Third, The Everlasting Pea
Best Original Score for a Television Special	Lifetime Achievement Award
Steph Copeland, Binged to Death; Jordan Andrew, Lowlifes; Caleb Chan and Brian Chan, The Thundermans Return; Darren Fung, Calamity Jane; Toby Sherriff and Jake Monaco, Taz: Quest for Burger	Mychael Danna

=== 2025 ===
Nominees for the 2025 awards were announced in July 2025, with winners announced in September.

Best Original Main Title Theme Music	Best Original Song
Suad Bushnaq, Al Batal (The Hero); Adam King, Earth Abides; Andrew Lockington, Landman; Angelo Oddi, When Hope Calls; Jaasmaan Singh, The Flower at the End of the World	Matthew O'Halloran, Steph Copeland and Kibra Tsegaye, "Trapped in the Spotlight"; Jordan Andrew, "Pregame"; Steph Copeland and Matthew O'Halloran, "Alpine Rhapsody"; Ava Kay, Rick Suvalle and Craig Carlisle, "The Christmas Letter Express : A Christmas Wish" (Thomas & Friends); Jonathan Evans, "Fin Loose" (Mermicorno: Starfall)
Best Original Score for an Animated Series or Special	Best Original Score for a Comedy Series or Special
Spencer Creaghan, Hot Wheels Racerverse: "The Complete Star Wars/Hot Wheels Racerverse Saga"; Caleb Chan and Brian Chan, The Fairly OddParents: A New Wish: "The Department of Magical Violations"; Peter Chapman and Shaw Han-Liem, Go Togo: "Time to Go!"; Daniel Ingram and Trevor Hoffmann, Lego Friends: The Next Chapter: "Space Race Competition"; Erica Procunier, Thomas & Friends: "The Christmas Letter Express"	Caleb Chan and Brian Chan, North of North: "Bad Influence"; Dason Johnson, Wordsville: "The Case of the Instruction Incident, Confidence Crisis & Rational Explanation"; Brian Pickett, James Chapple, Graeme Cornies, Rachael Johnstone and Jason Turriff, Odd Squad UK: "The New Ozzie"
Best Original Score for a Documentary, Factual or Reality Series or Special	Best Original Score for a Documentary Feature Film
Zachary Greer, Into the Fray: "All the Quiet Voices"; Justin Delorme, Absolutely Canadian: "Tea Creek"; Ben Fox, The Passionate Eye: "My Brother, Soleiman"; Andrew Gordon Macpherson, Dark Side of the Ring: "Ludvig Borga: Hellraiser from Helsinki"; Jesse Zubot, Josh Zubot and Jason Sharp, Mafia: Most Wanted: "They Always Get Away"	Justin Delorme, The Nest; Ben Fox, The Age of Water; Kalaisan Kalaichelvan and Alexandra Petkovski, Treasure of the Rice Terraces; Murray Lightburn, Any Other Way: The Jackie Shane Story; Tom Third, The Spoils
Best Original Score for a Dramatic Series or Special	Best Original Score for Games and Interactive Media
Steph Copeland and Michelle Osis, Murder on the Inca Trail: "Truth"; Lora Bidner and Rob Carli, Ruby and the Well: "I Wish...I Wish...I Wish"; Spencer Creaghan, SurrealEstate: "The Elephant in the Room"; Kalaisan Kalaichelvan, Bet: "Episode 1"; Andrew Lockington, Landman: "Wolfe"	Shaun Chasin, The Electric Forest; Janal Bechthold, The Choice- Chapters 2 & 3: Makayla Ep 2; Shaun Chasin, Touchgrind X; Trevor Hoffmann, Nurture: Doki’s Delivery
Best Original Score for a Narrative Feature Film	Best Original Score for a Short Film
David Parfit and Marc Junker, The Worlds Divide; Amin Bhatia, The Wall Street Boy (Kipkemboi); Todor Kobakov, Humane; Todor Kobakov, The Invisibles; Mark Korven and Michelle Osis, Don't Move	Spencer Creaghan and Chris Reineck, Spaceman; David Arcus, Nicely Awful; Steph Copeland and Henry Mitton, Alpine Rhapsody; Michelle Osis, T.Rex; Ari Posner and Amin Bhatia, Escape
Best Original Score for a Television Film	SCGC Industry Award
Andrés Galindo Arteaga, Trapped in the Spotlight; Lora Bidner, Terror Comes Knocking; Peter Chapman and Robert Carli, Wynonna Earp: Vengeance; Steph Copeland, Christmas in the Spotlight; James Ervin, Twin Lies	Jennifer Brown

=== 2026 ===
Nominees for the 2026 awards were announced in July 2026, with winners slated to be announced on September 14.

Best Original Main Title Theme Music	Best Original Song
Caleb Chan and Brian Chan, Boston Blue; Steph Copeland and Matthew O'Halloran, Property Brothers: Under Pressure; Ben Fox, Middle Life; Brian Ingram, Max & Maple: The Can-Do Kids; Jaasman Singh, Path of the Wind	Daniel Ingram, "Besties for Life" — Lego Friends; Matthew O'Halloran, "Life Has No If" — Finch & Midland; Alexandra Petkovski, "Here Goes Nothing" — You're Killing Me; Ari Posner, Amanda Martinez, Diego Nacho Lopez Garcia and Jennifer Hamburg, "Now I Know" — Rosie's Rules; Jaasman Singh, "Bachpan" — Path of the Wind; Karan Viegas, "Blood on Your Cardigan" — Locally Sourced
Best Original Score for an Animated Series or Special	Best Original Score for a Comedy Series or Special
Lorenzo Castelli, Dino Ranch: Island Explorers; Caleb Chan and Brian Chan, Lego Dreamzzz; Peter Chapman and Shaw-Han Liem, Go Togo; Leah Hidalgo, Unicorn Academy: Secrets Revealed; Erica Procunier, Thomas and Friends: All Engines Go	Brian Pickett, Graeme Cornies, James Chapple, Jason Turriff and Rachael Johnstone, Odd Squad; Simon Poole, Hate the Player: The Ben Johnson Story; Jeff Toyne, Palm Royale
Best Original Score for a Documentary, Factual or Reality Series or Special	Best Original Score for a Documentary Feature Film
Adrian Ellis, Into the Universe: Mysteries of the Cosmos; Maxime Fortin, Guerrier de demain; Darren Fung, Decisions, Decisions: The Science of Choice; Andrew Gordon Macpherson, Into the Void; Alexandra Petkovski and Kalaisan Kalaichelvan, RomCon: Who the Fuck Is Jason Porter?	David Arcus, Black Zombie; Caleb Chan and Brian Chan, Spring After Spring; Jonathan Kawchuk, Frozen in Time; Andy Milne, True North; Tom Third, Modern Whore
Best Original Score for a Dramatic Series or Special	Best Original Score for Games and Interactive Media
Robert Carli, The Borderline; Robert Carli, Murdoch Mysteries; Caleb Chan and Brian Chan, Allegiance; Mark Korven and Michelle Osis, Billy the Kid; Alexandra Petkovski, You're Killing Me	Janal Bechthold, Through the Nebula; Stéphanie Hamelin Tomala, Forest Rites; Trevor Hoffmann, Nurture: Care Bears; Finn M-K, Windward Horizon; Daniela Pinto, Hunter’s Moon: A Sovereign Syndicate Adventure
Best Original Score for a Narrative Feature Film	Best Original Score for a Short Film
Caleb Chan, A Safe Distance; Steph Copeland, Bẫy Tiền; Ben Fox, Middle Life; Todor Kobakov, 40 Acres; Antoine Rochette, Out Standing	Jordan Han Andrew, The Thing Inside Her; Amanda Cawley, Charlie Is Not a Boy; Spencer Creaghan and Chris Reineck, Leopard; Justin Delorme, Louis Riel Day; Walker Grimshaw, Carry On!; Kalaisan Kalaichelvan, Karupy
Best Original Score for a Television Film	Special Awards
Steph Copeland, A Husband to Die For: The Lisa Aguilar Story; Adrian Ellis, The Christmas Clues; Christopher Guglick, We Met in December; Jordan Han Andrew, R.L. Stine's Pumpkinhead; Medhat Hanbali, The Snow Must Go On	Lifetime Achievement: Jonathan Goldsmith; SGCC Rising Talent: TBA

== See also ==
- List of music awards
- Music of Canada
