= Ashley Jane =

Canadian singer-songwriter

Ashley Jane is a Canadian singer-songwriter, who records and performs with the band In the City and as a songwriting collaborator with film soundtrack composers.

As a songwriter, she received a Canadian Screen Music Award nomination for Best Original Song in 2023 for "How Lucky Am I?", a collaboration with Stephen Krecklo for the film Press Play. At the 12th Canadian Screen Awards in 2024, she received a Canadian Screen Award nomination for Best Original Song for "I Won't Break", a collaboration with Kamel Bushnaq and Suad Bushnaq for the 2023 film Queen Tut.
