= Canadian Screen Award for Best Original Score =

Annual Canadian film award

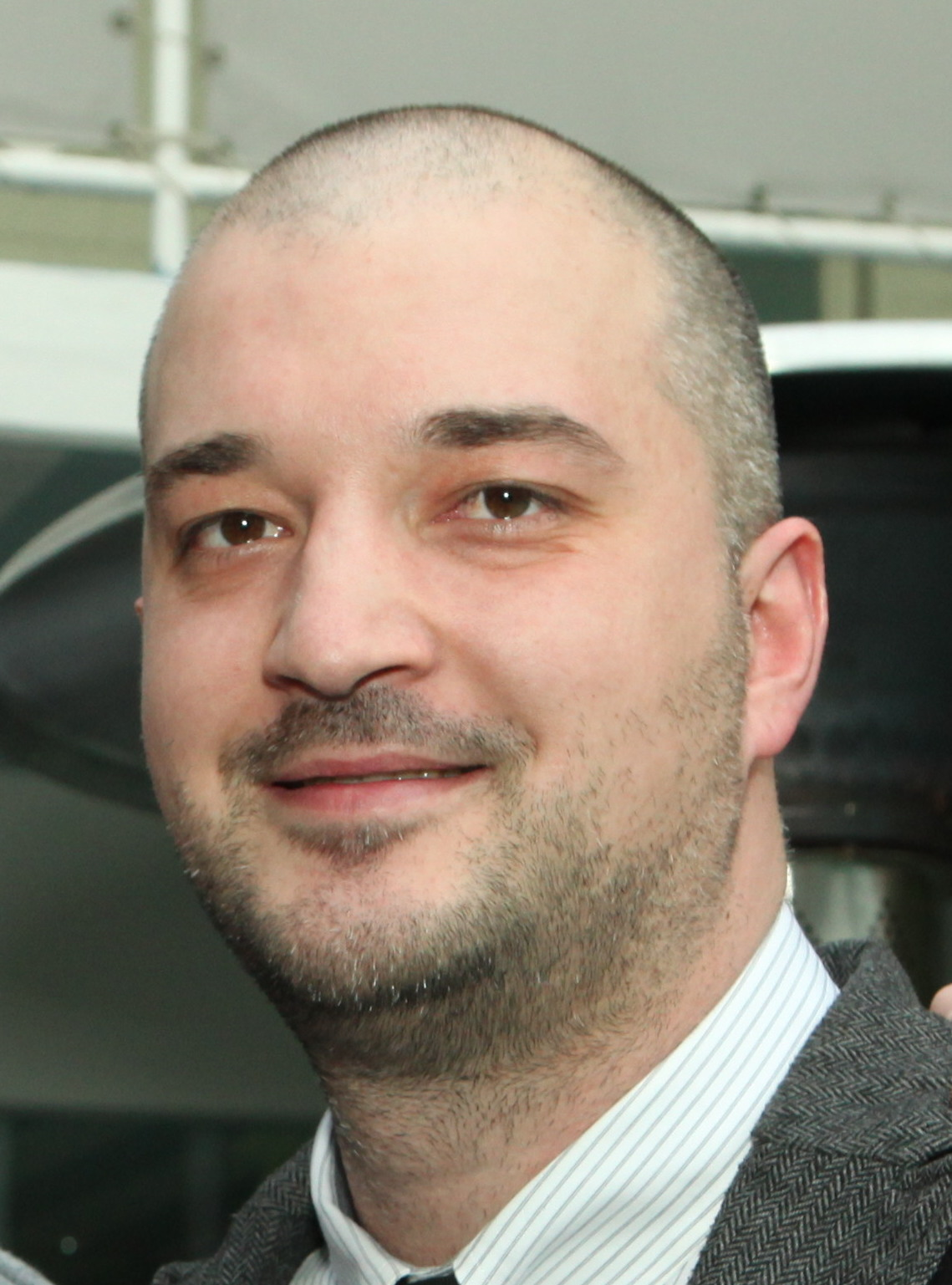
- 2025 winner: Todor Kobakov
- Country: Canada
- Presented by: Academy of Canadian Cinema & Television
- First award: 1970
- Currently held by: Todor Kobakov for 40 Acres (2025)
- Website: academy.ca/awards

An annual award for Best Achievement in Music - Original Score is presented by the Academy of Canadian Cinema and Television to the best Canadian original score for the previous year. Prior to 2012, the award was presented as part of the Genie Awards; since 2012 it has been presented as part of the expanded Canadian Screen Awards.

== 1970s ==
Year	Nominee	Film	Ref
1970; 22nd Canadian Film Awards
1970; 22nd Canadian Film Awards	Harry Freedman	The Act of the Heart	
1971; 23rd Canadian Film Awards
1971; 23rd Canadian Film Awards	Jean Cousineau	Mon oncle Antoine	
1972; 24th Canadian Film Awards
1972; 24th Canadian Film Awards	Pierre F. Brault	The True Nature of Bernadette (La vraie nature de Bernadette)	
1973; 25th Canadian Film Awards
1973; 25th Canadian Film Awards	Willie Lamothe, Tristan Hansinger, Chick Peabody, Peter Van Ginkel	The Death of a Lumberjack (La mort d'un bûcheron)	
1974
1974	No award presented		
1975; 26th Canadian Film Awards
1975; 26th Canadian Film Awards	Nick Whitehead	Lions for Breakfast	
1976; 27th Canadian Film Awards
1976; 27th Canadian Film Awards	Lewis Furey	Normande (La tête de Normande St-Onge)	
1977; 28th Canadian Film Awards
1977; 28th Canadian Film Awards	Paul Hoffert	Outrageous!	
1978; 29th Canadian Film Awards
1978; 29th Canadian Film Awards	Oscar Peterson	The Silent Partner	
1978; 29th Canadian Film Awards	Paul Zaza, Jim Caverhill	Three Card Monte	
1978; 29th Canadian Film Awards	Paul Hoffert	The Third Walker	
1978; 29th Canadian Film Awards	Maurice Marshall	Marie-Anne	

== 1980s ==
Year	Nominee	Film	Ref
1980; 1st Genie Awards
1980; 1st Genie Awards	Carl Zittrer, Paul Zaza	Murder By Decree	
1980; 1st Genie Awards	Hagood Hardy	Jack London's Klondike Fever	
1980; 1st Genie Awards	Paul Hoffert	Wild Horse Hank	
1980; 1st Genie Awards	Alain Leroux	It Rained All Night the Day I Left	
1980; 1st Genie Awards	Howard Shore	The Brood	
1981; 2nd Genie Awards
1981; 2nd Genie Awards	Art Philips	The Lucky Star	
1981; 2nd Genie Awards	Matthew McCauley	Middle Age Crazy	
1981; 2nd Genie Awards	John Mills-Cockell	Terror Train	
1981; 2nd Genie Awards	Kenneth Wannberg	Tribute	
1982; 3rd Genie Awards
1982; 3rd Genie Awards	Claude Denjean, Stéphane Venne	The Plouffe Family (Les Plouffe)	
1982; 3rd Genie Awards	Jean Cousineau	Happy Memories (Les Beaux souvenirs)	
1982; 3rd Genie Awards	Micky Erbe, Maribeth Solomon	Ticket to Heaven	
1982; 3rd Genie Awards	Bo Harwood, Lance Rubin	Happy Birthday to Me	
1983; 4th Genie Awards
1983; 4th Genie Awards	Michael Conway Baker	The Grey Fox	
1983; 4th Genie Awards	Jonathan Goldsmith	Visiting Hours	
1983; 4th Genie Awards	Maribeth Solomon, Micky Erbe	Threshold	
1984; 5th Genie Awards
1984; 5th Genie Awards	Lewis Furey	Maria Chapdelaine	
1984; 5th Genie Awards	Michael Conway Baker	Deserters	
1984; 5th Genie Awards	Joël Bienvenue	Au clair de la lune	
1984; 5th Genie Awards	Karl Kobylansky	Dead Wrong	
1984; 5th Genie Awards	André Vincelli	A 20th Century Chocolate Cake	
1985; 6th Genie Awards
1985; 6th Genie Awards	François Dompierre	Mario	
1985; 6th Genie Awards	J. Douglas Dodd, Michael Oczko	Walls	
1985; 6th Genie Awards	Germain Gauthier	The Dog Who Stopped the War (La Guerre des tuques)	
1985; 6th Genie Awards	François Lanctôt	Sonatine	
1985; 6th Genie Awards	Betty Lazebnik	Reno and the Doc	
1985; 6th Genie Awards	Paul Zaza	Isaac Littlefeathers	
1986; 7th Genie Awards
1986; 7th Genie Awards	François Dompierre	The Alley Cat (Le Matou)	
1986; 7th Genie Awards	Lewis Furey	Night Magic	
1986; 7th Genie Awards	Lewis Furey	The Peanut Butter Solution	
1986; 7th Genie Awards	Philippe Sarde	Joshua Then and Now	
1987; 8th Genie Awards
1987; 8th Genie Awards	Michael Conway Baker	John and the Missus	
1987; 8th Genie Awards	Marie Bernard, Richard Grégoire	Exit	
1987; 8th Genie Awards	Marvin Dolgay	The Blue Man	
1988; 9th Genie Awards
1988; 9th Genie Awards	Jean Corriveau	Night Zoo (Un Zoo la nuit)	
1988; 9th Genie Awards	Mychael Danna	Family Viewing	
1988; 9th Genie Awards	Tim McCauley	Blue City Slammers	
1989; 10th Genie Awards
1989; 10th Genie Awards	Howard Shore	Dead Ringers	
1989; 10th Genie Awards	Aaron Davis, Billy Bryans	Office Party	
1989; 10th Genie Awards	François Dompierre	The Revolving Doors (Les Portes tournantes)	
1989; 10th Genie Awards	Richard Grégoire	The Heat Line (La ligne de chaleur)	
1989; 10th Genie Awards	Osvaldo Montes	Straight for the Heart (À corps perdu)	
1989; 10th Genie Awards	Maribeth Solomon, Micky Erbe	Milk and Honey	

== 1990s ==
Year	Nominee	Film	Ref
1990; 11th Genie Awards
1990; 11th Genie Awards	Yves Laferrière	Jesus of Montreal (Jésus de Montréal)	
1990; 11th Genie Awards	Jeff Danna, Mychael Danna	Cold Comfort	
1990; 11th Genie Awards	Mychael Danna	Speaking Parts	
1990; 11th Genie Awards	Milan Kymlicka	Babar: The Movie	
1990; 11th Genie Awards	Lawrence Schragge	Palais Royale	
1991; 12th Genie Awards
1991; 12th Genie Awards	Jean Corriveau	The Savage Woman (La Demoiselle sauvage)	
1991; 12th Genie Awards	Marie Bernard	Love Crazy (Amoureux fou)	
1991; 12th Genie Awards	Georges Delerue	Black Robe	
1991; 12th Genie Awards	Jonathan Goldsmith	Diplomatic Immunity	
1991; 12th Genie Awards	Mark Korven	White Room	
1992; 13th Genie Awards
1992; 13th Genie Awards	Richard Grégoire	Being at Home with Claude	
1992; 13th Genie Awards	Michael Becker	Solitaire	
1992; 13th Genie Awards	Graeme Coleman	North of Pittsburgh	
1992; 13th Genie Awards	Pierre Desrochers	The Saracen Woman (La Sarrasine)	
1992; 13th Genie Awards	Howard Shore	Naked Lunch	
1993; 14th Genie Awards
1993; 14th Genie Awards	Simon Kendall	Cadillac Girls	
1993; 14th Genie Awards	Todd Boekelheide	Digger	
1993; 14th Genie Awards	Pierre Desrochers	Women in Love (Les Amoureuses)	
1993; 14th Genie Awards	Mark Korven	The Grocer's Wife	
1993; 14th Genie Awards	Yves Laferrière	The Sex of the Stars (Le Sexe des étoiles)	
1994; 15th Genie Awards
1994; 15th Genie Awards	Mychael Danna	Exotica	
1994; 15th Genie Awards	George Blondheim	Whale Music	
1994; 15th Genie Awards	Mark Korven	Henry & Verlin	
1994; 15th Genie Awards	Milan Kymlicka	A Hero's Life (La Vie d'un héros)	
1994; 15th Genie Awards	Milan Kymlicka	Matusalem	
1995; 16th Genie Awards
1995; 16th Genie Awards	Milan Kymlicka	Margaret's Museum	
1995; 16th Genie Awards	Serge Arcuri, Luc Aubry	Black List (Liste noire)	
1995; 16th Genie Awards	Aaron Davis, John Lang	Rude	
1995; 16th Genie Awards	Richard Grégoire	Water Child (L'Enfant d'eau)	
1995; 16th Genie Awards	Mark Korven	The Michelle Apartments	
1996; 17th Genie Awards
1996; 17th Genie Awards	Mark Korven	Curtis's Charm	
1996; 17th Genie Awards	Richard Rodney Bennett	Swann	
1996; 17th Genie Awards	Normand Corbeil	Screamers	
1996; 17th Genie Awards	Mychael Danna	Lilies	
1996; 17th Genie Awards	Ron Sures	Joe's So Mean to Josephine	
1997; 18th Genie Awards
1997; 18th Genie Awards	Mychael Danna	The Sweet Hereafter	
1997; 18th Genie Awards	François Dompierre	The Ideal Man (L'Homme idéal)	
1997; 18th Genie Awards	Serge Laforest, Gaëtan Gravel	Night of the Flood (La nuit du déluge)	
1997; 18th Genie Awards	Robert Marcel Lepage	The Human Plant (La Plante humaine)	
1997; 18th Genie Awards	Don MacDonald	Kissed	
1998; 19th Genie Awards
1998; 19th Genie Awards	John Corigliano	The Red Violin	
1998; 19th Genie Awards	Mychael Danna	Regeneration	
1998; 19th Genie Awards	Jonathan Goldsmith	Such a Long Journey	
1998; 19th Genie Awards	Mark Korven	Cube	
1998; 19th Genie Awards	Alexina Louie, Alex Pauk	Last Night	
1999; 20th Genie Awards
1999; 20th Genie Awards	Mychael Danna	Felicia's Journey	
1999; 20th Genie Awards	John Wesley Chisholm, Michael Diabo, John Roby	Beefcake	
1999; 20th Genie Awards	Nick Dyer, Eric Cadesky	Extraordinary Visitor	
1999; 20th Genie Awards	Jono Grant	Jacob Two Two Meets the Hooded Fang	
1999; 20th Genie Awards	Maurice Jarre	Sunshine	

== 2000s ==
Year	Nominee	Film	Ref
2000; 21st Genie Awards
2000; 21st Genie Awards	Patric Caird	Here's to Life!	
2000; 21st Genie Awards	Normand Corbeil	The Art of War	
2000; 21st Genie Awards	Aaron Davis, John Lang	Love Come Down	
2000; 21st Genie Awards	François Dompierre	Laura Cadieux II (Laura Cadieux...la suite)	
2000; 21st Genie Awards	Alan Reeves	To Walk with Lions	
2001; 22nd Genie Awards
2001; 22nd Genie Awards	Chris Crilly	Atanarjuat: The Fast Runner	
2001; 22nd Genie Awards	Alexander Balanescu	Eisenstein	
2001; 22nd Genie Awards	Bertrand Chénier	Tar Angel (L'Ange de goudron)	
2001; 22nd Genie Awards	Pierre Duchesne	A Girl at the Window (Une jeune fille à la fenêtre)	
2001; 22nd Genie Awards	Andrew Zealley, Don Pyle	The Law of Enclosures	
2002; 23rd Genie Awards
2002; 23rd Genie Awards	Mychael Danna	Ararat	
2002; 23rd Genie Awards	Chris Ainscough	Suddenly Naked	
2002; 23rd Genie Awards	Michel Cusson	The Collector (Le Collectionneur)	
2002; 23rd Genie Awards	Glenn Morley	Duct Tape Forever	
2002; 23rd Genie Awards	Zbigniew Preisner	Between Strangers	
2003; 24th Genie Awards
2003; 24th Genie Awards	Christopher Dedrick	The Saddest Music in the World	
2003; 24th Genie Awards	Michel Cusson	Séraphin: Heart of Stone (Séraphin: un homme et son péché)	
2003; 24th Genie Awards	Mychael Danna	The Snow Walker	
2003; 24th Genie Awards	Richard Grassby-Lewis, Jon Hassell, Bob Locke, Tim Norfolk	Owning Mahowny	
2003; 24th Genie Awards	Sandy Moore	The Wild Dogs	
2004; 25th Genie Awards
2004; 25th Genie Awards	Terry Frewer	Head in the Clouds	
2004; 25th Genie Awards	Benoit Charest	The Triplets of Belleville (Les Triplettes de Belleville)	
2004; 25th Genie Awards	Michel Corriveau	The Last Tunnel (Le Dernier tunnel)	
2004; 25th Genie Awards	Pierre Duchesne	Looking for Alexander (Mémoires affectives)	
2004; 25th Genie Awards	Charles Papasoff	So the Moon Rises (La lune viendra d'elle-même)	
2005; 26th Genie Awards
2005; 26th Genie Awards	Mychael Danna	Water	
2005; 26th Genie Awards	Mychael Danna	Where the Truth Lies	
2005; 26th Genie Awards	Longo Hai, Geoff Bennett, Ben Johannesen	Sabah	
2005; 26th Genie Awards	Éric Pfalzgraf	Manners of Dying	
2005; 26th Genie Awards	Byron Wong	Lie With Me	
2006; 27th Genie Awards
2006; 27th Genie Awards	Jean Robitaille	Without Her (Sans elle)	
2006; 27th Genie Awards	Normand Corbeil	Cheech	
2006; 27th Genie Awards	Michel Cusson	The Rocket (Maurice Richard)	
2006; 27th Genie Awards	Pierre Desrochers	The Secret Life of Happy People (La Vie secrète des gens heureux)	
2006; 27th Genie Awards	Hilmar Orn Hilmarsson	Beowulf & Grendel	
2007; 28th Genie Awards
2007; 28th Genie Awards	Howard Shore	Eastern Promises	
2007; 28th Genie Awards	David Hirschfelder	Shake Hands with the Devil	
2007; 28th Genie Awards	Steve London	That Beautiful Somewhere	
2007; 28th Genie Awards	Don MacDonald	Fido	
2007; 28th Genie Awards	Ryûichi Sakamoto	Silk	
2008; 29th Genie Awards
2008; 29th Genie Awards	John McCarthy	The Stone Angel	
2008; 29th Genie Awards	Normand Corbeil	Emotional Arithmetic	
2008; 29th Genie Awards	Laurent Eyquem	Mommy Is at the Hairdresser's (Maman est chez le coiffeur)	
2008; 29th Genie Awards	Nikos Kypourgos	Fugitive Pieces	
2008; 29th Genie Awards	Robert Marcel Lepage	The Necessities of Life (Ce qu'il faut pour vivre)	
2009; 30th Genie Awards
2009; 30th Genie Awards	Normand Corbeil	The Master Key (Grande Ourse: La Clé des possibles)	
2009; 30th Genie Awards	Benoît Charest	Polytechnique	
2009; 30th Genie Awards	Bertrand Chénier	Love and Savagery	
2009; 30th Genie Awards	Christian Clermont	5150 Elm's Way (5150, rue des Ormes)	
2009; 30th Genie Awards	Ben Mink	Fifty Dead Men Walking	

== 2010s ==
Year	Nominee	Film	Ref
2010; 31st Genie Awards
2010; 31st Genie Awards	Pasquale Catalano	Barney's Version	
2010; 31st Genie Awards	Brendan Canning	Trigger	
2010; 31st Genie Awards	Jonathan Goldsmith	High Life	
2010; 31st Genie Awards	Keegan Jessamy, Bryce Mitchell	At Home by Myself...With You	
2010; 31st Genie Awards	Sook-Yin Lee, Buck 65, Adam Litovitz	Year of the Carnivore	
2011; 32nd Genie Awards
2011; 32nd Genie Awards	Howard Shore	A Dangerous Method	
2011; 32nd Genie Awards	Ramachandra Borcar	Suspicions (Jaloux)	
2011; 32nd Genie Awards	Mychael Danna	The Whistleblower	
2011; 32nd Genie Awards	Martin Léon	Monsieur Lazhar	
2011; 32nd Genie Awards	Philip Miller	The Bang Bang Club	
2012; 1st Canadian Screen Awards
2012; 1st Canadian Screen Awards	Howard Shore	Cosmopolis	
2012; 1st Canadian Screen Awards	Benoit Charest	Mars and April (Mars et Avril)	
2012; 1st Canadian Screen Awards	Noia	Laurence Anyways	
2012; 1st Canadian Screen Awards	Don Rooke, Hugh Marsh, Michelle Willis	Still Mine	
2012; 1st Canadian Screen Awards	E. C. Woodley	Antiviral	
2013; 2nd Canadian Screen Awards
2013; 2nd Canadian Screen Awards	Danny Bensi, Saunder Jurriaans	Enemy	
2013; 2nd Canadian Screen Awards	Ramachandra Borcar	Rock Paper Scissors (Roche papier ciseaux)	
2013; 2nd Canadian Screen Awards	Michel Cusson	The Storm Within (Rouge sang)	
2013; 2nd Canadian Screen Awards	Kim Gaboury, Michel Cusson	Maïna	
2013; 2nd Canadian Screen Awards	Gabriel Yared	Tom at the Farm (Tom à la ferme)	
2014; 3rd Canadian Screen Awards
2014; 3rd Canadian Screen Awards	Howard Shore	Maps to the Stars	
2014; 3rd Canadian Screen Awards	Patrice Dubuc, Gaëtan Gravel	Meetings with a Young Poet	
2014; 3rd Canadian Screen Awards	Patrick Lavoie	Henri Henri	
2014; 3rd Canadian Screen Awards	Dan Mangan, Jesse Zubot	Hector and the Search for Happiness	
2014; 3rd Canadian Screen Awards	Jeffrey Morrow	Cast No Shadow	
2015; 4th Canadian Screen Awards
2015; 4th Canadian Screen Awards	Michael Brook	Brooklyn	
2015; 4th Canadian Screen Awards	Michel Corriveau	Anna	
2015; 4th Canadian Screen Awards	François Dompierre	The Passion of Augustine (La Passion d'Augustine)	
2015; 4th Canadian Screen Awards	Chris Gestrin	Songs She Wrote About People She Knows	
2015; 4th Canadian Screen Awards	Stephen Rennicks	Room	
2016; 5th Canadian Screen Awards
2016; 5th Canadian Screen Awards	Todor Kobakov, Steve London, David Braid	Born to Be Blue	
2016; 5th Canadian Screen Awards	Alain Mayrand	Numb	
2016; 5th Canadian Screen Awards	Taymaz Saba	Window Horses	
2016; 5th Canadian Screen Awards	Michael White	Hevn (Revenge)	
2016; 5th Canadian Screen Awards	Jesse Zubot	Two Lovers and a Bear	
2017; 6th Canadian Screen Awards
2017; 6th Canadian Screen Awards	Mychael Danna, Jeff Danna	The Breadwinner	
2017; 6th Canadian Screen Awards	Viviane Audet, Robin-Joël Cool, Alexis Martin	Cross My Heart (Les Rois mongols)	
2017; 6th Canadian Screen Awards	Pierre-Philippe Côté	Ravenous (Les Affamés)	
2017; 6th Canadian Screen Awards	Ben Fox	Never Steady, Never Still	
2017; 6th Canadian Screen Awards	Terry Riley, Gyan Riley	Hochelaga, Land of Souls (Hochelaga terre des âmes)	
2018; 7th Canadian Screen Awards
2018; 7th Canadian Screen Awards	Alaska B	Through Black Spruce	
2018; 7th Canadian Screen Awards	Olivier Alary	Allure	
2018; 7th Canadian Screen Awards	Philippe Brault	The Fireflies Are Gone (La disparition des lucioles)	
2018; 7th Canadian Screen Awards	Naren Chandavarkar, Benedict Taylor	Black Kite	
2018; 7th Canadian Screen Awards	Yves Gourmeur	The Hummingbird Project	
2019; 8th Canadian Screen Awards
2019; 8th Canadian Screen Awards	Howard Shore	The Song of Names	
2019; 8th Canadian Screen Awards	Robert Carli	Lie Exposed	
2019; 8th Canadian Screen Awards	Peter Chapman	Riot Girls	
2019; 8th Canadian Screen Awards	Ian LeFeuvre, Stephen Krecklo	James vs. His Future Self	
2019; 8th Canadian Screen Awards	Andrew Lockington	The Kindness of Strangers	

== 2020s ==
Year	Nominee	Film	Ref
2020; 9th Canadian Screen Awards
2020; 9th Canadian Screen Awards	Howard Shore	Funny Boy	
2020; 9th Canadian Screen Awards	Janal Bechthold	Marlene	
2020; 9th Canadian Screen Awards	Mychael Danna	Guest of Honour	
2020; 9th Canadian Screen Awards	Jay McCarrol	The Kid Detective	
2020; 9th Canadian Screen Awards	Michelle Osis, Lowell Boland	Bloodthirsty	
2021; 10th Canadian Screen Awards
2021; 10th Canadian Screen Awards	Jonathan Goldsmith	All My Puny Sorrows	
2021; 10th Canadian Screen Awards	Suad Bushnaq	Jasmine Road	
2021; 10th Canadian Screen Awards	Spencer Creaghan	Motherly	
2021; 10th Canadian Screen Awards	Darren Fung	Cinema of Sleep	
2021; 10th Canadian Screen Awards	Stephen Krecklo	Between Waves	
2022; 11th Canadian Screen Awards
2022; 11th Canadian Screen Awards	Todor Kobakov	Brother	
2022; 11th Canadian Screen Awards	Adrian Ellis	Cult Hero	
2022; 11th Canadian Screen Awards	Ian LeFeuvre	Ashgrove	
2022; 11th Canadian Screen Awards	Ari Posner	The End of Sex	
2022; 11th Canadian Screen Awards	Howard Shore	Crimes of the Future	
2023; 12th Canadian Screen Awards
2023; 12th Canadian Screen Awards	Jay McCarrol	BlackBerry	
2023; 12th Canadian Screen Awards	Alysha Brilla	The Queen of My Dreams	
2023; 12th Canadian Screen Awards	Suad Bushnaq	Queen Tut	
2023; 12th Canadian Screen Awards	Steph Copeland	Cascade	
2023; 12th Canadian Screen Awards	Ryan Shore	Zombie Town	
2024; 13th Canadian Screen Awards
2024; 13th Canadian Screen Awards	Mychael Danna	Seven Veils	
2024; 13th Canadian Screen Awards	Amin Bhatia	The Wall Street Boy (Kipkemboi)	
2024; 13th Canadian Screen Awards	Spencer Creaghan	I Don't Know Who You Are	
2024; 13th Canadian Screen Awards	Darren Fung	The Silent Planet	
2024; 13th Canadian Screen Awards	Todor Kobakov	The Invisibles	
2025; 14th Canadian Screen Awards
2025; 14th Canadian Screen Awards	Todor Kobakov	40 Acres	
2025; 14th Canadian Screen Awards	Suad Bushnaq	Yunan	
2025; 14th Canadian Screen Awards	Steph Copeland	It Feeds	
2025; 14th Canadian Screen Awards	Adrian Ellis, Walker Grimshaw	The Legacy of Cloudy Falls	
2025; 14th Canadian Screen Awards	Erica Procunier	Please, After You	

== See also ==
- Prix Iris for Best Original Music
- List of film music awards § Best score
