= Lie Exposed =

2019 Canadian drama film

- Film poster
- Directed by: Jerry Ciccoritti
- Written by: Jeff Kober
- Based on: Pornography by Jeff Kober
- Produced by: Leslie Hope
- Starring: Leslie Hope; Jeff Kober; Bruce Greenwood
- Cinematography: Alex Gomez
- Edited by: George Roulston
- Music by: Robert Carli
- Production company: Tintype Pictures
- Distributed by: Mongrel Media
- Release date: November 4, 2019 (Windsor)
- Running time: 93 minutes
- Country: Canada
- Language: English
- Box office: $7,467

Lie Exposed is a 2019 Canadian drama film, directed by Jerry Ciccoritti. An adaptation of Jeff Kober's theatrical play Pornography, the film stars Leslie Hope as Melanie, a woman who responds to a cancer diagnosis by abandoning her husband Frank (Bruce Greenwood) to go to California and pose nude for a tintype photographer (Kober), before returning home to Toronto when the photographs are slated to be exhibited in a gallery show.

The film's cast also includes Benjamin Ayres, Megan Follows, Kris Holden-Ried, David Hewlett, Grace Lynn Kung, Daniel Maslany, Kristin Lehman and Tony Nappo.

The film premiered in November 2019 at the Windsor International Film Festival.

== Critical response ==
Chris Knight of Postmedia panned the film, writing that "Every so often there comes along a Canadian film to remind us of the stereotypical CanCon of old. You know, the kind of loosely plotted stories where couples stand in dark rooms and talk darkly and obliquely, and drink darkly, and glance obliquely at one another, until 90 minutes pass and the whole exercise comes to an end with no one in the film any wiser, and no one in the audience any more entertained."

For The Globe and Mail, Barry Hertz wrote that the film "is dull and repetitive and may induce embarrassing memories of catching furtive glimpses of various soft-core movies on Citytv from back in the mid-1990s, but at least Melanie and Frank's story contains a drip of sincerity to it." He concluded that the viewer's time would be much better spent typing the word "pornography" into Google to see what turns up. Janet Smith of The Georgia Straight wrote that the film "feels behind on 21st-century art theory, on ideas about the male gaze, and who holds the power," and concluded that the film "is ambitious, but it’s never quite as shocking, raw, or life-changing as it wants to be. The overall impression, to steal from Lana Del Rey, is beautiful people with beautiful problems."

== Awards ==
Robert Carli received a Canadian Screen Award nomination for Best Original Score at the 8th Canadian Screen Awards in 2020.
