= Michelle Osis =

Australian-Canadian film and television composer

Michelle Osis is an Australian-Canadian film and television composer. She is most noted for her work on the film Bloodthirsty, for which she and Lowell Boland received a Canadian Screen Award nomination for Best Original Score at the 9th Canadian Screen Awards in 2021.

Her other credits have included the films The Skin We're In, Juggernaut, Knuckleball, Harpoon and True Fiction. She was previously a Canadian Screen Award nominee for Best Music in a Non-Fiction Program or Series at the 8th Canadian Screen Awards in 2020 for the television documentary The Corporate Coup d'État.

== Awards ==
Award	Date of ceremony	Category	Work	Result	Ref.
Canadian Screen Awards	2020	Best Original Music, Non-Fiction	The Corporate Coup d'État	Nominated	
Canadian Screen Awards	2021	Best Original Score	Bloodthirsty with Lowell Boland	Nominated	
Canadian Screen Awards	2022	Best Original Music, Non-Fiction	The Nature of Things: "Inside the Great Vaccine Race"	Nominated	
Canadian Screen Awards	2023	Best Original Music, Television Documentary	Unloved: Huronia's Forgotten Children	Nominated	
Canadian Screen Music Awards	2023	Best Original Score for a Narrative Feature Film	Fixation	Nominated	
Canadian Screen Music Awards	2025	Best Original Score for a Dramatic Series or Special	Murder on the Inca Trail: "Truth" with Steph Copeland	Won	
Canadian Screen Music Awards	2025	Best Original Score for a Narrative Feature Film	Don't Move with Mark Korven	Nominated	
Canadian Screen Music Awards	2025	Best Original Score for a Short Film	T-Rex	Nominated	
Canadian Screen Music Awards	2026	Best Original Score for a Dramatic Series or Special	Billy the Kid with Mark Korven	Pending	
