= Alexandra Petkovski =

Canadian composer

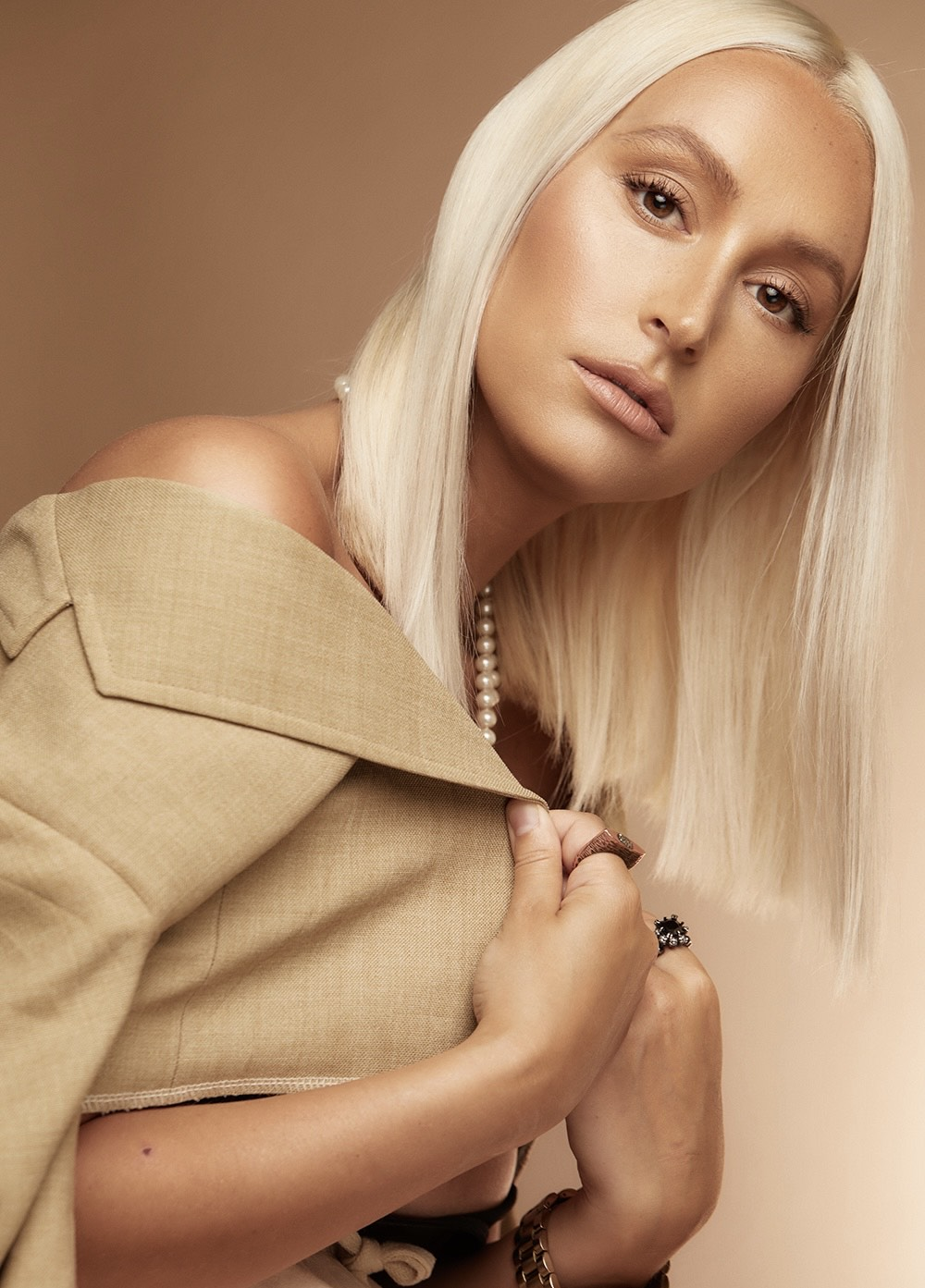

Background information
- Born: Toronto, Ontario, Canada
- Genres: Film score, classical, pop, alternative
- Occupations: Composer, artist, music producer, song writer
- Years active: 2019–present

Alexandra Petkovski, also known professionally as her artist project, FJØRA, is a Canadian composer, producer, artist, songwriter and multi-instrumentalist.

== Life and career ==
Petkovski was born in Toronto, Ontario. She received a Bachelor of Music degree from Queen's University, and applied for a Master of Music in Composition from Belmont University, but decided not to take it. Instead she entered the music industry, taking a sabbatical from New York University's Steinhardt School of Music, where she was pursuing postgraduate studies for film scoring.

Petkovski serves on the board of directors for the Alliance for Women Film Composers, Screen Composers Guild of Canada, is a voting member at the World Soundtrack Academy, Academy of Television Arts & Sciences, the Society of Composers & Lyricists, and was invited to join the Recording Academy's voting member class of 2022. She was selected for the Grammy's #NEXT Class of 2023 ambassadors. She is an alumna of the Slaight Family Music Lab at the Canadian Film Centre and of the Los Angeles Film Conducting Intensive, where she studied under the direction of William Ross, Angel Velez, Conrad Pope and Emilie Bernstein, composing for and recording with the Hollywood Studio Symphony Orchestra.

== Filmography ==
=== As composer ===
- 2020 : Welcome to the Blumhouse (feature film campaign)
- 2021 : Better at Texting (short film)
- 2021 : Scotiabank Canada #SaidBefore Campaign (TV special)
- 2021 : Deathloop : "Déjà Vu" (video game)
- 2022 : White Ribbon: I Knew All Along (short film - PSA)
- 2022 : This Place (additional vocal score; feature film)
- 2022 : Adidas Women: Support is Everything Campaign (Campaign series)
- 2022 : More Than Robots (additional music; documentary)
- 2023 : The Routine (short film)
- 2023 : Happily Undead After (pilot - short film)
- 2023 : Kids Help Phone: Feel Out Loud (short film - PSA)
- 2023 : I Was Here (short film - documentary)
- 2023 : Laced (additional score composer - Feature film)
- 2024 : A Family Affair (additional vocal score; feature film)
- 2024 : Masks (short film)
- 2024 : Treasure of the Rice Terraces

== Discography ==
- 2019 : Cruel World
- 2021 : Onyx
- 2021 : Jade(d)
- 2022 : tiger’s eye (EP)
- 2022 : Sondheim Series

== Awards and nominations ==
Year	Result	Award	Category	Work	Ref.
2021	Nominated	Hollywood Music in Media Awards	Best Original Song - Video Game	"Déjà Vu" from Deathloop	
2021	Nominated	Hollywood Music in Media Awards	Best Original Song/Score - Trailer	"Déjà Vu" from Deathloop	
2021	Won	Clio Awards	Bronze Clio - Television Trailer/Teaser	Welcome to the Blumhouse	
2022	Nominated	Hollywood Music in Media Awards	Original Song/Score — Trailer (Video Game)	"Get Down" from Fortnite Chapter 3 Season 4 Battle Pass trailer	
2022	Nominated	Hollywood Music in Media Awards	Original Song/Score — Commercial Advertisement	"Support is Everything" (Adidas Women)	
2022	Won	Hollywood Music in Media Awards	Original Song — Short Film	"Call Me By Any Name" from Better at Texting	
2022	Won	Game Audio Network Guild Awards	Best Original Song	"Déjà Vu" from Deathloop	
2023	Nominated	Canadian Screen Music Awards	Best Original Song	"Deathloop: Déja Vu Remix" — Deathloop	
2023	Nominated	Hollywood Music in Media Awards	Best Original Song - Short Film	The Routine	
2024	Nominated	Hollywood Music in Media Awards	Best Original Song - Short Film (Live Action)	Masks	
2024	Nominated	Hollywood Music in Media Awards	Best Song/Score - Commercial advertisement	Donna Karan - In Women We Trust	
2024	Won	Hollywood Music in Media Awards	Best Music Design - Trailer	American Horror Story: Delicate	
2024	Nominated	Canadian Screen Music Awards	Best Original Song	Black Skylands	
