= Janal Bechthold =

Canadian composer

Janal Bechthold is a Canadian composer for film, television, and interactive media most known for creating scores for independent films such as psychological thriller "Art of Obsession", "Martin's Hagge" written by Gordon Pinsent and starring Sheila McCarthy, and video game "The Rival Books of Aster". Recently, Janal composed the music for the new Canadian web-series Begin Again the Series. She is also known as an advocate for women and female-identifying screen composers in Canada.

== Background ==
Janal Bechthold attended Wilfrid Laurier University and received an honours bachelor of music therapy degree in 1998.

On May 17, 2016, Bechthold was awarded the Christopher Dedrick Award for Live Musicians in Media Soundtracks. The recipient is selected through a peer review of professional screen composers to "encourage and support the hiring and use of live musicians in the production of media music soundtracks".

At the 9th Canadian Screen Awards in 2021, she received a nomination for Best Original Score, for her work on the film Marlene, and two nominations for Best Original Music in a Non-Fiction Program or Series, for the CBC Docs POV episodes "Company Town" and "Cottagers and Indians".

At the first-annual Canadian Screen Music Awards (CASMA) held in 2022, Bechthold was awarded Best Original Score For Interactive Media alongside co-composer La-Nai Gabriel for the interactive graphic novel, "No Reason to Apologize: The Resilient Legacy of Viola Desmond". She also received a nomination in the same category for the virtual reality documentary, "The Choice".

== Advocacy ==
Janal Bechthold has been a member of the board of directors for the Screen Composers Guild of Canada (SCGC) since 2012. Currently, she holds the title of 2nd Vice President and is Chair of the Women Composers Advisory Council.

On June 26, 2018, and under the leadership of Bechthold and the Women Composers Advisory Council, the Screen Composers Guild of Canada released the report, "Gender in the Canadian Screen Composing Industry", the findings from a research study which outline the number and proportion of women composers working in the screen-based media industries and demonstrate some differences between genders when looking at career progression. The study was funded by the Ontario Media Development Corporation (Ontario Creates), the SCGC, in partnership with Society of Composers, Authors and Music Publishers of Canada (SOCAN), and conducted by Circum Inc.
