= Kalaisan Kalaichelvan =

Canadian composer

Kalaisan Kalaichelvan is a Canadian composer of contemporary classical music, electroacoustic music and music for film and television.

Originally from the Scarborough district of Toronto, Ontario, he is an alumnus of the Slaight Family Music Lab at the Canadian Film Centre and the Sundance Composers Lab. He has worked with ensembles such as the Bozzini Quartet, the Albany Symphony, the Hamilton Philharmonic and the Glenn Gould New Music Ensemble.

Kalaisan has scored a number of films such as In Flames, which premiered at the Cannes Film Festival in 2023 and The Gymnasts of Fisherman Colony, executive produced by Malala Yousafszai. He recently scored the popular Netflix TV series Bet.

He is the brother of film director Kalainithan Kalaichelvan.

== Filmography ==
- Two Doves on a Painted Lake - 2020
- A Feller and the Tree - 2021
- This Place - 2022
- In Flames - 2023
- Aisha - 2023
- Junglefowl - 2023
- Shook - 2024
- Faces - 2024
- Karupy - 2025
- Bet - 2025
- Sea Star - 2025
- Treasure of the Rice Terraces - 2025
- RomCon: Who the Fuck Is Jason Porter? - 2025
- The Gymnasts of Fisherman Colony - 2026
- Seahorse - 2026

== Awards ==
| Award | Date of ceremony | Category | Work | Result | Ref. |
|---|---|---|---|---|---|
| Canadian Screen Music Awards | 2025 | Best Original Score for a Documentary Feature Film | Treasure of the Rice Terraces with Alexandra Petkovski | Nominated | |
| Canadian Screen Music Awards | 2025 | Best Original Score for a Dramatic Series or Special | Bet: "Episode 1" | Nominated | |
| Canadian Screen Music Awards | 2026 | Best Original Score for a Short Film | Karupy | Pending | |
| Canadian Screen Music Awards | 2026 | Best Original Score for a Documentary, Factual or Reality Series or Special | RomCon: Who the Fuck Is Jason Porter? with Alexandra Petkovski | Pending | |
