= Tom Third =

Canadian film and television composer

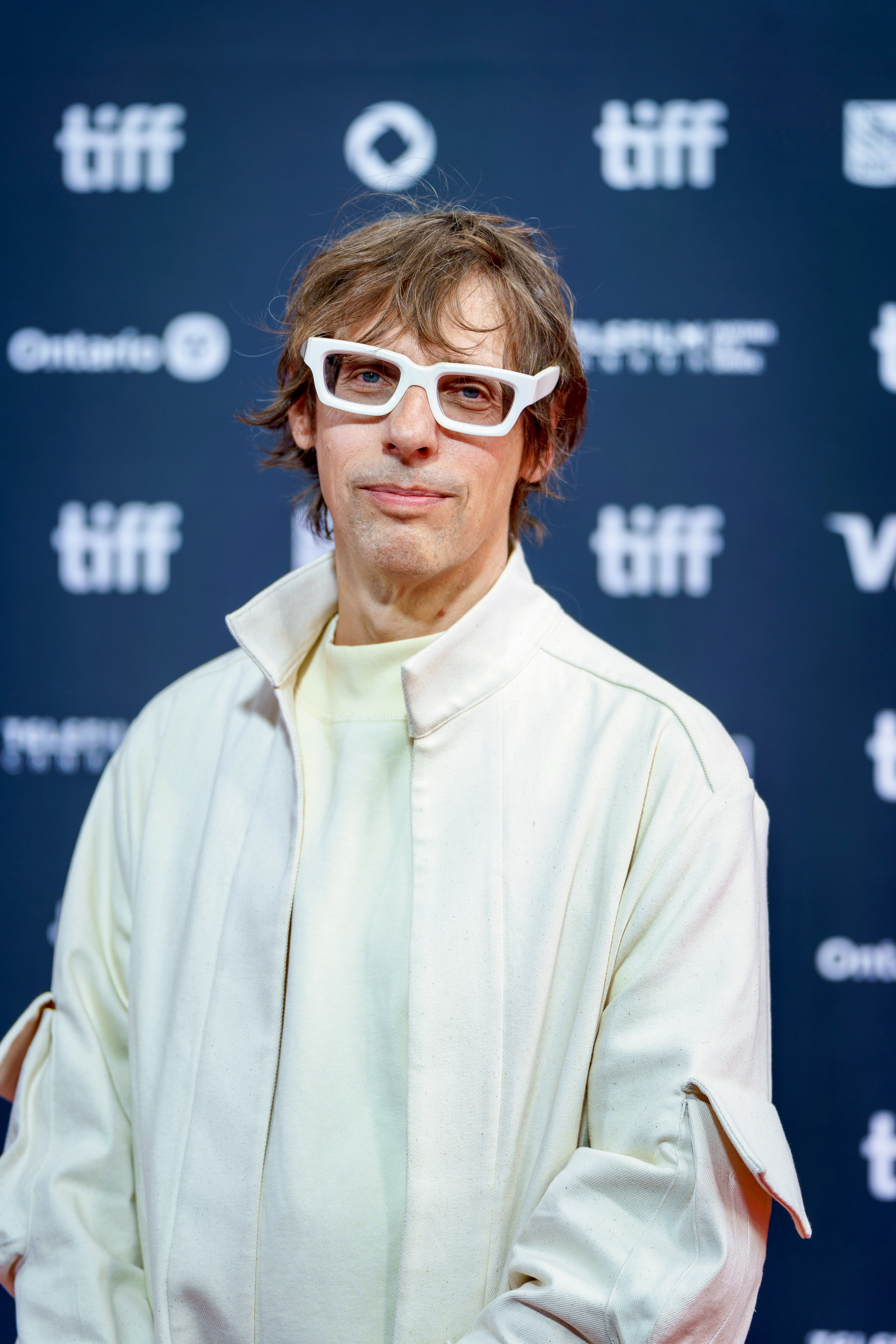
Film composer Tom Third at the Toronto International Film Festival in 2024

Tom Third is a Canadian film and television composer. He is most noted as a two-time Gemini Award and Canadian Screen Award recipient, winning Best Original Music Score for a Dramatic Program, Mini-Series or TV Movie at the 25th Gemini Awards in 2010 for The Summit, and Best Original Music Score for a Program at the 2nd Canadian Screen Awards in 2014 for Borealis.

He has also received two Gemini nominations for his work on the television series ReGenesis at the 21st Gemini Awards in 2006 and the 22nd Gemini Awards in 2007, and three CSA nominations for Original Music, Fiction for his work on the television series Coroner at the 8th Canadian Screen Awards in 2020, the 9th Canadian Screen Awards in 2021, and the 10th Canadian Screen Awards in 2022.

In 2022, he received two nominations for the Screen Composers Guild of Canada's inaugural Canadian Screen Music Awards, garnering nods in Best Original Score for a Series or Limited Series for Coroner and Best Original Score for a Non-Fiction Series or Limited Series for BLK, An Origin Story.

He is the partner of documentary filmmaker Christy Garland.
