= Adrian Ellis (composer) =

Canadian composer

Adrian Ellis is a Canadian film and television composer. He is most noted for his work on the 2022 film Cult Hero, for which he received a Canadian Screen Award nomination for Best Original Score at the 11th Canadian Screen Awards in 2023, and the 2024 film The Legacy of Cloudy Falls, for which he received a nomination in the same category at the 14th Canadian Screen Awards in 2026.

His other credits have included the films The Scarehouse, The Man in the Shadows, The Hoard, The Hyperborean and Mother Father Sister Brother Frank, and the web series Clutch and Out with Dad. He has received several Indie Series Award nominations for his work on Clutch and Out with Dad, and was a Canadian Screen Music Award nominee for Best Original Score for a Short Film in 2022 for Old Mother Tongue.

He has also served as vice-president of the Screen Composers Guild of Canada.
