= BLK, An Origin Story =

BLK: An Origin Story is a Canadian documentary television series, which aired in 2022 on History. Created, directed and produced by Sudz Sutherland and Jennifer Holness for Hungry Eyes Film and Television, the series explores Black Canadian history.

The four episodes explored the initial migrations of Black Loyalist, Black Refugee and Jamaican Maroon communities to Nova Scotia in the 18th and 19th centuries; the history of the Little Burgundy neighbourhood in Montreal; the history of the Hogan's Alley neighbourhood in Vancouver; and the story of John "Daddy" Hall, a free-born Black and Mohawk Canadian man from Owen Sound who was captured by the American military when he fought in the War of 1812, and forced into slavery for 13 years until escaping and returning to Canada.

The series premiered on February 26, 2022.

== Awards ==
Tom Third received a nomination for Best Original Score for a Non-Fiction Series or Limited Series at the Screen Composers Guild of Canada's inaugural Canadian Screen Music Awards.

The series won five Canadian Screen Awards at the 11th Canadian Screen Awards in 2023, for Best Photography in a Documentary Program or Factual Series (Ricardo Diaz), Best Editing in a Documentary Program or Series (Avril Jacobson), Best Direction in a Documentary Series (Holness), Best Original Music in a Documentary Series (Third) and Best Writing in a Documentary (Sutherland).
