= Mother Father Sister Brother Frank =

2024 Canadian film

- Film poster
- Directed by: Caden Douglas
- Written by: Caden Douglas
- Produced by: Michael Lomenda; Matt Schichter; Johnathan Sharp
- Starring: Enrico Colantoni; Mindy Cohn; Melanie Leishman; Iain Stewart; Juan Chioran
- Cinematography: Matthew Campagna; Gaelen Cook
- Edited by: Maria Todorov-Topouzov
- Music by: Adrian Ellis; Walker Grimshaw
- Production company: LittleBull Productions
- Distributed by: Highball TV
- Release date: April 6, 2024 (Panic Fest)
- Running time: 85 minutes
- Country: Canada
- Language: English

Mother Father Sister Brother Frank is a Canadian thriller comedy film, directed by Caden Douglas and released in 2024. The film centres on the dysfunctional suburban Jennings family, who have to come together to save themselves after a family dinner goes awry with Uncle Frank lying dead on the floor.

The film stars Enrico Colantoni as father Jerry, Mindy Cohn as mother Joy, Melanie Leishman as sister Jolene, Iain Stewart as brother Jim and Juan Chioran as Frank. Sharron Matthews also appears in the film as nosy neighbour Ronda, with Izad Etemadi, Chad Connell and Matthew G. Brown in supporting roles.

The film's production was announced in March 2023 by streaming service Highball TV. It was shot in Hamilton, Ontario.

The film premiered on April 6, 2024, at Panic Fest in the United States, and had its Canadian premiere on April 26 at the Calgary Underground Film Festival. It was also screened at the 2024 Inside Out Film and Video Festival. Its European Premiere was at the It's Alive! Horror Film Festival in Sofia, Bulgaria.

== Plot ==
At Jerry and Joy Jennings' Sunday family dinner with their adult children Jolene and Jim, the tension is palpable. The dad is alcohol focused, Jim is mobile obsessed, Jolene is surprisingly not drinking, and the mom is talking incessantly to cover the silence.

Although 'everything is fine', each of them is being secretive. Jolene hides in the upstairs bathroom to avoid Joy gushing over her 'babies'. Jim follows, noticing she is hiding something. Once confirming Jolene is pregnant, she asks after his husband Pete, then he deflects.

Meanwhile Joy and Jerry are discussing their news. He is for just telling the kids, but she wants to at the perfect moment. Jolene and Jim return before they can agree.

Suddenly, uncle Frank knocks. Jerry's older brother is immediately antagonistic. Rude to everyone, he tells them about his journey from Mexico, where he lives to avoid the police. Frank came on a fake ID and by bus to further evade them.

Jolene and Jim try to chat, but Frank mostly negatively remarks about his nephew's sexuality. Joy brings out the special pie she made to soften the blow of losing the house, a banana breeze pie. After Frank rants about how wonderful it is, Jolene demands he reveal why he is here. The parents argue with Frank outside, while their kids are asked to serve the pie.

Before the parents return, Jim reveals to Jolene that he is getting divorced from his husband Pete. The parents enter alone and, painfully, explain. As their travel agency had been doing poorly for a decade, they permitted someone to launder money through it. Frank found out, so has been blackmailing Jerry.

Frank gleefully announces he is taking both the house and the 5 million that Joy and Jerry earned from the laundering. Everyone has to pack their things that evening.

Frank said he would only back down over his dead body, so plants the idea of killing him, both in Jolene's and her parents' minds. He is downstairs, throwing out family mementos, as the others are upstairs, starting to plot their revenge.

Jolene gives Frank an opportunity to redeem himself. She suggests he take the cash but leave them the house. Frank admits he mostly seeks revenge against Jerry, who he has envied for over 30 years. Jolene gives him the Lorazepam dusted pie, which he devours.

Joy smashes a lamp over Frank's head, then Jerry tries to strangle him. She then pushes Frank down the stairs. Angry, he tries to strangle Jim, who defends himself by raising his right hand laden with the pie knife, which Frank walks into. As he succumbs to his wounds, his hand catches the pie tin and it falls on his face.

Jolene and Jim are horrified at their role in Frank's demise, but a gleeful Jerry praises them. He and Joy soon after sneak off and have sex, which Jolene sees. Appalled, she hurries upstairs and slips on Uncle Frank's pool of blood.

Jolene's pregnancy is accidentally revealed, annoying her as she has not decided yet. Meanwhile the neighbor appears, seeking her dog. Afterwards, Jim starts dismembering the body in the basement. His ex Pete soon appears, making a scene. Jolene lets him so he stops disturbing the neighbors. Jim and Pete finally resolve their differences, when there is a knock at the door.

A police officer has come for a noise complaint, so insists on entering. Tarps are blocking the dining room, so they explain they are renovating. The neighbor's dog appears with the arm it found in their basement, but the family manages to keep it from the officer. He is suspicious of what is going on, so Joy decides to 'confess' by weirdly explaining what happened without telling the truth.

Finally, Pete convinces the officer to not call back up, then leads him out to 'give him a ride home'. But he returns, to remind them they owe him big time. Pete therefore expects they will do a murder mystery activity another Sunday.

Everyone comes together, stripping the dining room walls and scrubbing the floors. Jim chops up the body so part can be frozen and they can start to burn the rest. Everyone becomes closer.

== Cast ==
- Enrico Colantoni as Jerry Jennings
- Mindy Cohn as Joy Jennings
- Melanie Leishman as Jolene, Joy + Jerry's daughter
- Iain Stewart as Jim Jennings, Joy + Jerry's son
- Juan Chioran as Frank Jennings, Jerry's brother
- Sharron Matthews as Ronda
- Izad Etemadi as Pete
- Matthew G. Brown as Officer Truman
- Chad Connell as Carl

== Critical reception ==
Reviews were generally positive.

Cath Clarke wrote in The Guardian: "You could describe Mother Father Sister Brother Frank as Fargo-esque, in the sense that it’s a tale of nice ordinary folks doing bad stuff while snow falls serenely around them – though in truth it is less flavoursome and the humour is more obvious, not so deliciously off-kilter."

Writing in The Stranger, Chase Hutchinson said: "It’s a film that, much like the disruptive character at its center, is always in danger of overstaying its welcome but is still just clever enough to get away with it. With each escalation and swerve it serves up, the commitment of the cast, as well as a clever script, ensures it remains light on its feet, even as its characters constantly stumble over what to do."
