= Compulsion (2013 film) =

- Theatrical release poster
- Directed by: Egidio Coccimiglio
- Written by: Floyd Byars
- Based on: 301, 302 by Lee Seo-gun
- Produced by: Gary Howsam; Bill Marks
- Starring: Heather Graham; Carrie-Anne Moss; Kevin Dillon; Joe Mantegna
- Cinematography: Vilmos Zsigmond
- Edited by: D. Gillian Truster
- Music by: Jonathan Goldsmith
- Production companies: Phase 4 Films; Prime AD AB; Rollercoaster Entertainment; TAJJ Media; Vortex Words Pictures
- Distributed by: Phase 4 Films
- Release dates: 21 June 2013 (US); 13 August 2013 (Canada)
- Running time: 88 minutes
- Countries: Canada; United States
- Language: English
- Budget: $4 million

Compulsion is a 2013 psychological thriller film directed by Egidio Coccimiglio and starring Heather Graham, Carrie-Anne Moss, Kevin Dillon, and Joe Mantegna. An English-language remake of the 1995 South Korean film 301, 302, the film focuses on two women occupying neighboring apartments, each one grappling with psychological disorders that begin to overtake their lives.

== Plot ==
Amy, an obsessive chef, befriends a bulimic former child star Saffron living in the apartment next door, sparking a fiery battle of wills. Unstable Amy wields a spatula like a samurai, and dreams of the day she'll have her own cooking show. As a young girl, Amy was infatuated with a television show starring Saffron, who subsequently vanished into obscurity. The damaged daughter of a tyrannical stage mother, Saffron has struggled with an eating disorder ever since she was a little girl. Plagued by deep-rooted intimacy issues, she spends most of her time alone until the day she crosses paths with Amy. At first, Amy can't believe her luck at having her childhood idol living right next door, and at first the two women even sense an ethereal connection that bonds them. Later, as their true colors begin to emerge, both Amy and Saffron discover just how toxic their chemistry may be.

== Cast ==
- Heather Graham as Amy
  - Hannah Brigden as young Amy
- Carrie-Anne Moss as Saffron
  - Katie Douglas as young Saffron
  - Daiva Johnston as teenage Saffron
- Kevin Dillon as Fred
- Joe Mantegna as Detective Reynolds
- Kate Trotter as Sylvia
- James McGowan as Bob
- Natalie Brown as Rebecca
- Jean Yoon as Leslie
- John Tokatlidis as Lucas
- Gary Vena as Jack

== Themes ==
According to the film’s press release: "With images of sumptuous food and sensual enjoyment, the film explores the intimacy between the two through their connection with food, eating disorders and sex. In a battle of wills, one woman overflows with illusions and fearlessly faces life while the other withdraws from everything and fearlessly faces death."

== Production ==
Originally titled 10A/10B, the film was announced in 2009, with Marisa Tomei and Liv Tyler in the lead roles and original director Park Chul-soo set to helm.

Principal photography took place in Sault Ste. Marie and Toronto, Ontario.

== Release ==
The film was originally set for a theatrical release by Dimension Films, but was dropped for unknown reasons. It was instead given a limited release by Phase 4 Films, before going direct-to-video.

== Reception ==
Charlie Schmidlin of IndieWire stated "Sustaining a post-child-star career seems a difficult enough labyrinth to manage by itself, but combine that challenge with a bubbly, incessant neighbor intent on stardom, as a new film exploring the toll of celebrity aims to do, and you have an interesting dark vehicle for two talented actresses as a result." Chuck Wilson of the Miami New Times commented "The game of wills [...] between the two women isn't terribly interesting, much less suspenseful, and in fact, it's not clear that director Egidio Coccimiglio and screenwriter Floyd Byars ever settled on whether they were making a thriller or a satire about food and celebrity. The ever-vibrant Graham has fun with Amy's slyly embittered patter to her imaginary TV audience, while Moss valiantly commits herself to Saffron's psychological pain."

== See also ==
- Girl, Interrupted, a 1999 drama film.
