= Between Waves (film) =

2020 Canadian film

- Film poster
- Directed by: Virginia Abramovich
- Written by: Katherine Andrews; Virginia Abramovich
- Produced by: Alex Jordan; Virginia Abramovich
- Starring: Fiona Graham; Luke Robinson
- Cinematography: Jason Webber
- Edited by: Jeremy Schaulin-Rioux
- Music by: Stephen Krecklo
- Production companies: Jordan Entertainment; Breathe Entertainment
- Distributed by: Vortex Media; Reel 2 Reel Films
- Release date: October 12, 2020 (Portland)
- Running time: 100 minutes
- Country: Canada
- Language: English

Between Waves is a Canadian psychological thriller film, directed by Virginia Abramovich and released in 2020. The film stars Fiona Graham as Jamie, a photographer from Toronto whose partner Isaac (Luke Robinson), a quantum physicist who was researching the concept of travel between parallel dimensions, turns up dead, and Jamie then begins to see visions of him claiming that he succeeded in his research and imploring her to go through with their planned trip to São Miguel Island so that she can join him.

The film's cast also includes Sebastian Deery, Stacey Bernstein, Edwige Jean-Pierre, Miguel Damião, Eliya Sekulova, Jessica Barrera, Grayson Stephen, Juliet Lewsaw, Lora Burke and Holden Levack.

The film premiered in October 2020 at the Portland Film Festival, and had its Canadian premiere in December at the Whistler Film Festival, before going into commercial release in September 2021.

== Critical response ==
Jim Slotek of Original Cin rated the film B-minus, writing that "There’s a dream-state to Abramovich’s film, an is-she-crazy? consideration fueled by the early mention that Jamie has given up anti-anxiety drugs because… well, she’s also throwing up a lot early in the movie. It’s mentioned more than once that giving up 'benzos' cold turkey can cause hallucinations." He concluded that "The ambiguous parts of Between Waves are its strongest. But the left field plot twist that attempts to tie it all together made me rethink what sympathy I ever had for the central characters. Between Waves is interesting but flawed. But for me at least, the interesting parts were worth the watch.

Alisha Mughal of Exclaim! rated it 7 out of 10, writing that "Between Waves is a gripping debut, with entertaining mysterious and philosophical elements that work well together to create an absorbing friction. Its shortcomings (certain supporting performances fall flat) can be easily overlooked for Graham's wrenching portrayal of Jamie and for Abramovich and Andrews' compelling storytelling. Virginia Abramovich is a Canadian talent to not only keep an eye out for but also to be proud of."

== Awards ==
Stephen Krecklo received a Canadian Screen Award nomination for Best Original Score at the 10th Canadian Screen Awards in 2022.
