= Diaspora (film) =

- Directed by: Deco Dawson
- Written by: Deco Dawson
- Produced by: Kyle Irving; Rebecca Gibson; Hannah Johnson
- Starring: Yulia Guzhva
- Cinematography: Andrew Forbes
- Edited by: Deco Dawson; Faith Gore
- Music by: Justin Delorme
- Production company: Eagle Vision
- Release date: October 8, 2022 (FNC)
- Running time: 140 minutes
- Country: Canada
- Languages: English; Ukrainian

Diaspora is a 2022 Canadian experimental drama film, directed by Deco Dawson. The film stars Yulia Guzhva as Eva, a Ukrainian immigrant who is trying to establish a new life for herself in Winnipeg, Manitoba, depicting her isolation as she tries to find ways to communicate with speakers of 24 different languages she does not understand.

Although Eva's own dialogue in Ukrainian is subtitled, the film intentionally highlights Eva's isolation and alienation by not subtitling any of the supporting characters, so that the viewer is forced to rely on the same non-verbal communication cues as Eva.

The supporting cast includes Mateo Gubec, Henna Renja Hannele Anderson, Smokey Bear, Nupur Bhasvar, Ali Bozkaya, Wilfred Kent Demeria, Harpal Singh Dhiman, James Favel, Mike Flanjak, Ayako Yagi Georgison, Vitalie Himici, Ranjeev Kalia, Diane Kuhana Mukanzo Kamanda, Muhammad Hamza Khan, Ming La, Brooklyn Letexier-Hart and Jerome Ludovic.

== Production ==
The film was both Dawson's feature film debut, and his first film project since 2012's Keep a Modest Head.

Although the film's release in 2022 coincided with the Russian invasion of Ukraine and Canada's concurrent acceptance of many Ukrainian refugees, production on the film in fact started in 2019. Post-production and release was impacted by the COVID-19 pandemic in Canada. Dawson also shot extensively in a run-down area of Winnipeg, in an effort to document for posterity many buildings in the area that were slated at the time for demolition and redevelopment.

A different, unrelated short film of the same title, by Tyler Mckenzie Evans, was also released in 2022.

== Distribution ==
The film premiered at the 2022 Festival du nouveau cinéma, and was later screened in the Borsos Competition program at the 2022 Whistler Film Festival.

== Critical response ==
Justine Smith of Cult MTL wrote that "The straight-facing camera captures Winnipeg as nearly abandoned, and one senses that though Eva is looking for escape and new opportunities, the city has the sense of falling apart. Storefronts are darkened and many windows are boarded up. Rather than offering the promise of hope and growth, it already feels like a relic of the past." She concluded, however, that "The film is long, and though one sometimes senses it’s trying to capture the rhythmic notes of slow cinema, it feels more drawn out than purposeful. The texture of the film’s aesthetic has that overlit quality of a lot of TV, and the use of sparing VFX is nonetheless somewhat distracting. While a compelling experiment, the film doesn’t come together in the end, wearing out its welcome before the credits roll."

== Awards ==
Justin Delorme received a nomination for Best Original Main Title Theme Music at the 2023 Canadian Screen Music Awards.
