= Jasmine Road =

- Directed by: Warren Sulatycky
- Written by: Warren Sulatycky
- Produced by: Caitlyn Sponheimer
- Starring: Greg Ellwand; Aixa Kay; Melody Mokhtari; Caitlyn Sponheimer
- Cinematography: Wes Legge
- Edited by: Geoff Ashenhurst
- Music by: Suad Bushnaq
- Production company: Raging River Films
- Release date: October 1, 2020 (CIFF)
- Running time: 128 minutes
- Country: Canada
- Languages: English; Arabic

Jasmine Road is a Canadian drama film, directed by Warren Sulatycky and released in 2020. The film stars Greg Ellwand as Mac Bagley, a rancher in rural southern Alberta who has been emotionally closed off since the death of his wife; after his schoolteacher daughter Loretta (Caitlyn Sponheimer) learns that her student Heba (Melody Mokhtari), a Syrian refugee who came to Canada with her mother Layla (Aixa Kay) and uncle Salem (Ahmed Muslimani), needs to find a new place to live, she invites the family to stay at the ranch, with Mac's initial resistance to the idea giving way to acceptance and a new lease on life as he gets to know them.

The film premiered at the 2020 Calgary International Film Festival, and was subsequently screened as the opening gala of the 2020 Edmonton International Film Festival.

== Production ==
According to Sulatycky, the film was originally conceived as two separate ideas, one for a film about a grieving rancher and another for a film about what happens to refugee families after they've begun to establish themselves in Canada, but the concepts didn't really come together until he decided to combine them.

The film was shot in the Longview area in 2019.

== Awards ==
The film won the award for Best Canadian Feature at Edmonton, and an Audience Choice award at the 2021 Central Alberta Film Festival.

The film received five Rosie Award nominations from the Alberta Media Production Industries Association, for Best Feature Film, Best Direction, Best Screenplay, Best Sound and Best Costume Design. Sulatycky won the award for Best Screenplay.

Aixa Kay received an ACTRA Award nomination for Best Actress from the Vancouver chapter of UBCP/ACTRA.

Suad Bushnaq received a Canadian Screen Award nomination for Best Original Score at the 10th Canadian Screen Awards in 2022.
