= Sea Star (film) =

2025 Canadian short film directed by Tyler Mckenzie Evans

- Directed by: Tyler Mckenzie Evans
- Written by: Tyler Mckenzie Evans
- Produced by: Claire Desmarais; Malachi Ellis
- Starring: John Phillips
- Cinematography: Evan Ciniello
- Edited by: Anna Catley
- Music by: Kalaisan Kalaichelvan
- Production company: Malachi Ellis Productions
- Release date: September 7, 2025 (TIFF)
- Running time: 12 minutes
- Country: Canada
- Language: English

Sea Star is a Canadian short drama film, directed by Tyler Mckenzie Evans and released in 2025. The film stars John Phillips as Chris, a middle-aged Black Canadian man who is taking swimming lessons for the first time, while confronting the generational trauma and unresolved grief that have complicated the Black Canadian and African-American communities' relationship with the activity.

The cast also includes Joshua Obasi, Andrea Pavlovic, Cherene Francis, Ewan Wood, Andrea Davis, Lucas Lee, Rain Janjua and Charlotte Avis in supporting roles.

The film premiered in the Short Cuts program at the 2025 Toronto International Film Festival.

== Awards ==
Award	Date of ceremony	Category	Recipient	Result	Ref.
Canadian Film Festival	2026	Best Short Film	Tyler Mckenzie Evans	Won	
