= Marlene (2020 film) =

2020 Canadian film directed by Wendy Hill-Tout

- Film poster
- Directed by: Wendy Hill-Tout
- Written by: Wendy Hill-Tout; Cathy Ostlere
- Produced by: Wendy Hill-Tout
- Starring: Kristin Booth; Greg Bryk
- Cinematography: Charles Hamilton
- Edited by: Bridget Durnford
- Music by: Janal Bechthold
- Production company: Voice Pictures
- Release date: September 24, 2020 (TIFF)
- Running time: 110 minutes
- Country: Canada
- Language: English

Marlene is a 2020 Canadian docudrama film, directed by Wendy Hill-Tout. The film centres on the case of Steven Truscott, a Canadian man who spent many years in prison after being wrongfully convicted of a murder he did not commit, through the eyes of his wife Marlene.

The film stars Kristin Booth as Marlene Truscott, and Greg Bryk as Steven Truscott. Julia Sarah Stone and Dempsey Bryk also appear as the younger Marlene and Steven in flashback scenes.

The film was shot in 2019, with the working title Chasing Justice. It premiered at the 2020 Calgary International Film Festival. It was subsequently screened at the 2020 Whistler Film Festival.

== Reception ==
Chris Knight of the National Post gave the film two out of five stars and wrote, "I wish I'd loved Marlene – I was certainly educated by it. But the film tends to overplay its emotional hand, whether through Janal Bechthold's overpowering (and, to its credit, Canadian Screen Award nominated) score or a tendency for the characters to dramatize their every feeling."

Liam Lacey of Original Cin gave the film a C and wrote that it's "a melodramatic muddle, a flashback-loaded, over-orchestrated, and confusing legal story wrapped in a gauzy romance story."

=== Awards ===
Janal Bechthold received an aforementioned Canadian Screen Award nomination for Best Original Score at the 9th Canadian Screen Awards in 2021. The film was a runner-up for the 2020 Whistler Film Festival Audience Award.
