= Treasure of the Rice Terraces =

- Directed by: Kent Donguines
- Screenplay by: Kent Donguines
- Produced by: Jacob Crawford; Kent Donguines; Bailey Wood
- Starring: Whang-od
- Cinematography: John Fleming
- Edited by: Elad Tzadok
- Music by: Kalaisan Kalaichelvan; Alexandra Petkovski
- Production companies: Moon 7 Aimer Films
- Distributed by: Knowledge Network
- Release date: October 5, 2025 (VIFF)
- Running time: 75 minutes
- Country: Canada
- Language: English

Treasure of the Rice Terraces is a Canadian documentary film, directed by Kent Donguines and released in 2025. The film is a profile of Whang-od, a Kalinga woman from the Philippines who is over 100 years old, who is still active as a practitioner of traditional Kalinga batok tattooing practices.

The film entered production in 2023.

The film premiered at the 2025 Vancouver International Film Festival.

== Awards ==
Award	Date of ceremony	Category	Nominee	Result	Ref.
Canadian Screen Music Awards	2025	Best Original Score for a Documentary Feature Film	Kalaisan Kalaichelvan, Alexandra Petkovski	Nominated	
Directors Guild of Canada	2025	Best Picture Editing in a Documentary	Elad Tzadok	Nominated	
