= Queen Tut =

2023 Canadian drama film

- Directed by: Reem Morsi
- Written by: Bryan Mark; Abdul Malik; Kaveh Mohebbi
- Produced by: Lindsay Blair Goeldner; Shant Joshi
- Starring: Ryan Ali; Dani Jazzar; Alexandra Billings
- Cinematography: Issa Shah
- Edited by: Ben Lee Allan
- Music by: Suad Bushnaq
- Production companies: Fae Pictures; Hawkeye Pictures
- Distributed by: Cinephobia Releasing; Vortex Media
- Release date: September 25, 2023 (Reeling)
- Running time: 91 minutes
- Country: Canada
- Languages: English; Arabic

Queen Tut is a 2023 Canadian coming-of-age drama film, directed by Reem Morsi.

The film centres on Nabil (Ryan Ali), a closeted Coptic gay teenager from Egypt who silently grieves the recent death of his mother, a prolific seamstress and gown maker. Relocating to Toronto to live with his estranged father Iskander (Dani Jazzar), a financially successful but emotionally rigid property developer, Nabil finds a new queer sense of belonging and alternative home when he meets Malibu (Alexandra Billings), a longtime transgender bar owner and drag performer in the Church and Wellesley gay village whose historic queer nightclub faces the imminent threat of demolition and displacement by Iskander's development firm. Grappling with the tensions between his blood family and emerging chosen family, Nabil joins forces with Malibu's grassroots campaign to save the life of her bar and in the process, he not only cultivates his unique drag queen persona, but integrates the loss of his mother by embodying her memory and resurrecting her presence through his art.

The cast also includes Kiriana Stanton, Selena Vyle and Thom Allison, as well as Ben Sanders, Darrin Baker, Matt Willis, Danielle Bourgon, Cru Levey Cru Levey, Kendall Savage, Mostafa Shaker, Kaz Morgan, Khalid Karim, Minh Ly, Asil Moussa and Darren Stewart-Jones in supporting roles.

== Production and distribution ==
The film entered production in Toronto in 2022, with shooting locations including Nathan Phillips Square, the Church and Wellesley village, and Cinespace Film Studios. In addition to appearing in the film, Billings was also an executive producer, alongside Sonya Di Rienzo and Aeschylus Poulos.

The film was screened at the Cannes Film Market in May 2023. It premiered at Reeling: The Chicago LGBTQ+ International Film Festival in September, before going into commercial release in February 2024.

It is slated to air on Crave in June 2024 for Pride Month.

== Critical response ==
Barry Hertz of The Globe and Mail wrote that while the film had good intentions, it did not execute them as successfully as the contemporaneous drag-themed film Solo.

== Awards ==
Award	Year	Category	Work	Result	Ref(s)
Canadian Screen Awards	2024	Best Lead Performance in a Comedy Film	Alexandra Billings	Nominated	
Canadian Screen Awards	2024	Best Original Score	Suad Bushnaq	Nominated	
Canadian Screen Awards	2024	Best Original Song	Kamel Bushnaq, Ashley Jane, Suad Bushnaq "I Won't Break"	Nominated	
Canadian Screen Awards	2024	Best Original Song	Suad Bushnaq, Omar El-Deeb "Chez Habibi (Kul illi Batmannah)"	Nominated	
