= The Retreat (2021 film) =

- Directed by: Pat Mills
- Written by: Alyson Richards
- Produced by: Lauren Grant; Alyson Richards
- Starring: Tommie-Amber Pirie; Sarah Allen; Rossif Sutherland; Aaron Ashmore; Celina Sinden; Munro Chambers; Chad Connell; Patrick Garrow; Joey Coleman; Gavin Fox; Don Masters
- Cinematography: David Schuurman
- Edited by: Orlee Buium; Maureen Grant
- Music by: Steph Copeland
- Production companies: Alyson Richards Productions; Clique Pictures; Outside Line Studio
- Distributed by: Quiver Distribution
- Release date: May 21, 2021
- Running time: 82 minutes
- Country: Canada
- Language: English

The Retreat is a 2021 Canadian slasher film, directed by Pat Mills. The film stars Tommie-Amber Pirie and Sarah Allen as Renee and Valerie, a lesbian couple who book a weekend trip to a cabin in the woods, only to be abducted and tortured by a mysterious figure who livestreams gruesome killings of gay people on the Internet for profit.

The film was directly inspired by a desire to subvert the "bury your gays" and "dead lesbian syndrome" tropes common in horror fiction, by telling a story in which gay and lesbian characters are placed in a conventional horror film scenario but successfully use their wits to survive and fight back.

The cast also includes Rossif Sutherland, Aaron Ashmore, Celina Sinden, Munro Chambers, Chad Connell, Patrick Garrow, Joey Coleman, Gavin Fox and Don Masters.

The film was released to video on demand platforms in May 2021.

== Critical response ==
Chris Knight of Postmedia Network wrote that "The Retreat, with its same-sex protagonists and revenge-fantasy template, might be crudely characterized as a kind of lesbian Get Out, though I guess that title would have to be changed to Get Back In (The Closet). But the filmmakers clearly aren't trying to copy anyone. Richards has crafted an original story with relatively few moving parts, and a satisfyingly frightening premise. You might run from it if you're squeamish about violence, but otherwise it's definitely worth chasing."

For The Globe and Mail, Anne T. Donahue wrote that "much like the heroes of this story, The Retreat manages to defy expectations. And while some gory clichés still abound, it makes for a gruesome, gritty thriller that lets its leads shine. Especially since stars Sarah Allen and Tommie-Amber Pirie (who play Val and Renee) adhere viewers to them so successfully thanks to their depth and agency."

== Awards ==
Award	Date of ceremony	Category	Recipient(s)	Result	Ref(s)
Canadian Screen Awards	2022	Best Casting in a Film	Jenny Lewis, Sara Kay	Nominated	
Canadian Screen Awards	2022	Best Makeup	Karlee Morse, Stephanie Pringle	Nominated	
Canadian Screen Awards	2022	Best Stunt Coordination	Angelica Lisk-Hann	Nominated	
Canadian Screen Music Awards	2022	Best Original Score for a Narrative Feature Film	Steph Copeland	Won	
