= Dallas Roberts =

American actor (born 1970)

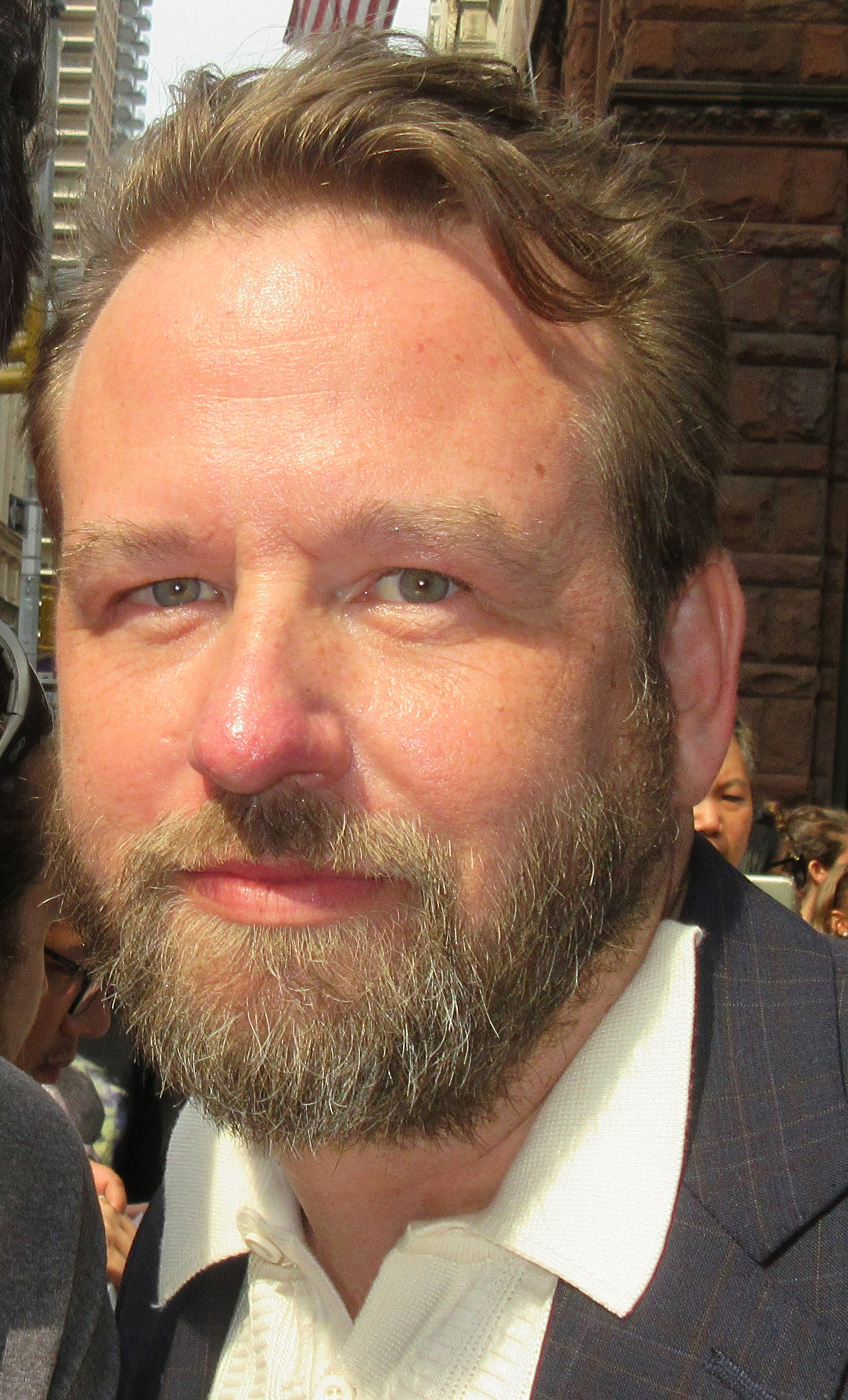
- Roberts in 2018
- Born: Dallas Mark Roberts; May 10, 1970 (age 56); Houston, Texas, U.S.
- Education: State College of Florida, Manatee-Sarasota; Juilliard School (BFA)
- Occupation: Actor
- Years active: 1994–present
- Spouse: Christine Jones
- Children: 2

Dallas Mark Roberts (born May 10, 1970) is an American actor. He is best known for his roles as Milton Mamet in the third season of AMC's The Walking Dead (2012–2013), Eliot Delson in Unforgettable, and Owen Cavanaugh in The Good Wife. He also starred in the Netflix comedy Insatiable. In 2024, he portrayed Jerome Oziel in a recurring role in the Netflix biographical crime drama series Monsters: The Lyle and Erik Menendez Story.

== Early life and education ==
Roberts was born and raised in Houston, Texas, where he attended Paul Revere Middle School and Robert E. Lee High School. He moved to Sarasota, Florida, where he graduated from Sarasota High School in 1988 and attended State College of Florida, Manatee-Sarasota. In 1990, Roberts was accepted to the Juilliard School in New York City, where he graduated in 1994 as a member of the Drama Division's Group 23.

== Career ==
Roberts is primarily based in New York City, where he regularly appears in theatrical productions. Off-Broadway he has appeared in a revival of Lanford Wilson's Burn This, opposite Edward Norton and Catherine Keener; in Adam Rapp's Nocturne, for which he was nominated for a Drama Desk Award; and in Caryl Churchill's A Number, opposite Sam Shepard and later Arliss Howard, among others.

Roberts' film work includes the screen adaptation of Michael Cunningham's A Home at the End of the World, and supporting roles in Walk the Line, The Notorious Bettie Page, 3:10 to Yuma, The Grey among others. He had a regular role on the Showtime drama The L Word. He starred in the AMC original series Rubicon as Miles Fiedler, a genius intelligence analyst at a national think tank. He appeared in twelve episodes of The Good Wife as Owen, the gay brother of Alicia Florrick (Julianna Margulies). He has also made many appearances on Law & Order and its spinoff, Law & Order: Special Victims Unit. He also appeared in a crossover arc between SVU, Chicago P.D. and Chicago Fire as serial killer Gregory Yates.

From August 2012 through March 2013, Roberts was in the cast of The Walking Dead as scientist Milton Mamet, who studies "walkers" (zombies). From 2013 to 2015, he played Eliot Delson on Unforgettable.

== Personal life ==
Roberts is married to scenic designer Christine Jones; the couple have two sons.

== Filmography ==
=== Film ===
Year	Title	Role	Notes
2003	Music	Matt	Short film
2004	A Home at the End of the World	Jonathan Glover	
2005	Walk the Line	Sam Phillips	
2005	Winter Passing	Ray	
2005	The Notorious Bettie Page	Scotty	
2006	Sisters	Dylan Wallace	
2006	Flicka	Gus	
2007	Joshua	Ned Davidoff	
2007	Lovely by Surprise	Mopekey	
2007	3:10 to Yuma	Grayson Butterfield	
2009	Ingenious	Matt	
2009	Shrink	Patrick	
2009	Tell-Tale	The Surgeon	
2010	The River Why	Titus	
2011	The Grey	Pete Henrick	
2012	The Factory	Carl	
2013	Dallas Buyers Club	David Wayne	
2013	Shadow People	Charlie Crowe	Also known as The Door
2014	Wallace	Wallace	Short film
2016	Ordinary World	Mickey	
2017	Mayhem	Lester McGill	
2017	My Friend Dahmer	Lionel Dahmer	
2019	Motherless Brooklyn	Danny Fantl	
2022	Glass Onion: A Knives Out Mystery	Devon Debella	
2022	Outpost	Dan	

=== Television ===
Year	Title	Role	Notes
1994	New York Undercover	Larry	Episode: "To Protect and Serve"
1995	Law & Order	Matthew Blanchard	Episode: "Guardian"
2001	Law & Order	Mark Daltrey	Episode: "Bronx Cheer"
2004	Law & Order: Special Victims Unit	Thomas Mathers	Episode: "Weak"
2006–2009	The L Word	Angus Partridge	Main role (season 3-4); guest (season 6)
2009	Law & Order	Marty Winston	Episode: "By Perjury"
2010	Law & Order: Criminal Intent	Dr. Abel Hazard	Episode: "Abel & Willing"
2010	Rubicon	Miles Fiedler	Main role
2010–2016	The Good Wife	Owen Cavanaugh	Recurring role
2012	Elementary	Dr. Mantlo	Episode: "Pilot"
2012–2013	The Walking Dead	Milton Mamet	Recurring role (season 3)
2013–2015	Unforgettable	Eliot Delson	Main role (season 2-3); guest (season 4)
2015–2016	Law & Order: Special Victims Unit	Greg Yates	Recurring role
2015–2016	Chicago P.D.	Greg Yates	2 episodes
2017	American Crime	Carson Hesby	Recurring role (season 3)
2018	FBI	Robert Lawrence	Episode: "Pilot"
2018–2019	Insatiable	Bob Armstrong	Lead role
2019	Heartstrings	Aaron	Episode: "Jolene"
2021	American Rust	Jackson Berg	Recurring role
2022	Big Sky	Richard Ford	4 episodes
2024	Monsters: The Lyle and Erik Menendez Story	Dr. Jerome Oziel	Recurring role
2025	Tulsa King	Dexter Deacon / Davis Deacon	4 episodes
