= The Legacy of Cloudy Falls =

- Directed by: Nick Butler
- Screenplay by: Nick Butler
- Produced by: Nick Butler; Kyle Mac; Lucas Meeuse
- Starring: Grace Glowicki; Andrew Moodie; Susan Berger; Amanda Martinez
- Cinematography: Dmitry Lopatin
- Edited by: Shane R. Preston
- Music by: Adrian Ellis; Walker Grimshaw
- Production company: Cloudy Pictures
- Distributed by: Filmoption International
- Release date: October 28, 2024 (FCIAT)
- Running time: 101 minutes
- Country: Canada
- Language: English

The Legacy of Cloudy Falls is a Canadian comedy-drama film, directed by Nick Butler and released in 2024. An ensemble cast narrative, the film centres on the eccentric residents of a run-down motel in Niagara Falls, Ontario.

The cast includes Susan Berger as Rita, the building superintendent; Grace Glowicki as Brigit, a woman who exposes occult frauds on her YouTube channel; Andrew Moodie as Terry, a middle-aged gay man who becomes obsessed with the drifter squatting in the neighbouring unit; and Amanda Martinez as Riley, a compulsive liar whose lies are beginning to catch up with her.

The cast also includes Josh Dohy, Brennan Clost, Ginger Minj, Alex Weiner, Richard Zeppieri, Bill MacDonald, Pamela MacDonald, Robert Nolan, Russell Yuen, Roseann Wilshere and Nigel Hamer in supporting roles.

== Production ==
The film, Butler's directorial debut, received production funding from Telefilm Canada in 2023. According to Butler, he conceived the film as a "love letter to Niagara Falls", based in part on his own childhood experiences travelling to the city for family vacations.

It was shot in 2024 in Niagara Falls, primarily at the Advance Inn motel on Lundy's Lane, with some location shooting at Clifton Hill. However, the casino scenes were not able to be shot at Casino Niagara as the venue management denied Butler permission to shoot there, and instead had to be filmed at Ajax Downs.

== Distribution ==
The film was screened at the European Film Market in February 2024, and had its public premiere in October at the Abitibi-Témiscamingue International Film Festival.

It was subsequently screened at the 2025 Canadian Film Festival.

== Awards ==
Adrian Ellis and Walker Grimshaw received a Canadian Screen Award nomination for Best Original Score at the 14th Canadian Screen Awards in 2026.
