= It's Alive! Horror Film Festival =

Annual film festival in Bulgaria

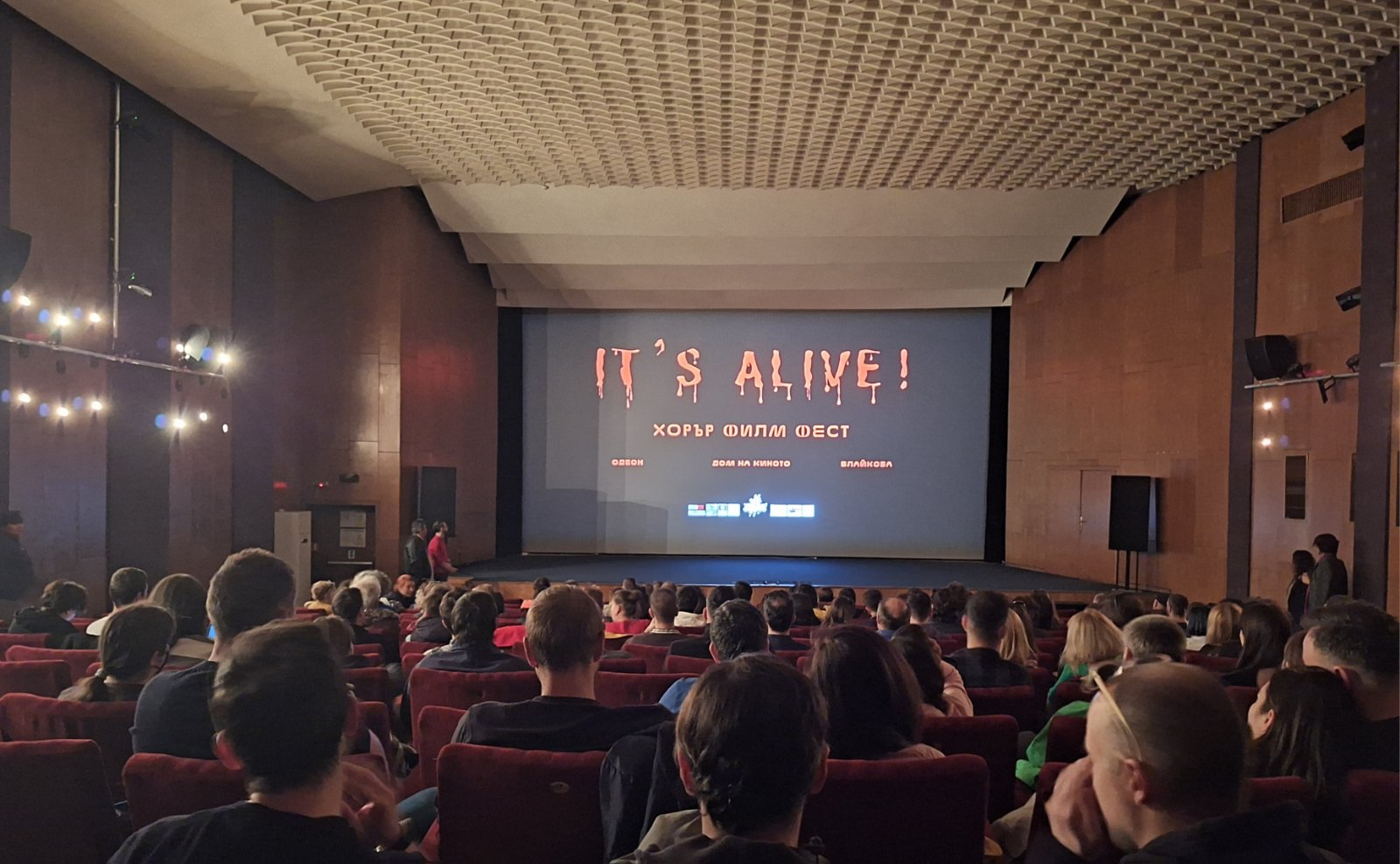
- Festival screening in 2024
- Location: Sofia, Bulgaria
- Language: International

It's Alive! Horror Film Fest (Bulgarian: It's Alive! хорър филм фест) is an annual film festival held in Sofia, Bulgaria since 2023. It is the first Bulgarian genre film festival and focuses mainly on horror films. The festival starts on Halloween (October 31st). The second edition of the festival was held from October 31 to November 10 2024 and included 5 feature and 19 short films. The latest edition took place between October 31 and November 14, 2026, and it was centred around snow-themed horror films.

== History ==
The festival starts with a film screening followed by a Halloween party and offers its audience new indie horror films plus retrospective of genre film classics. The opening film of the first edition of the festival (2023) was the Australian folk horror drama You Won't Be Alone and the first closing film was the Mexican supernatural horror film Huesera: The Bone Woman. The second edition was focused on the body horror subgenre and David Cronenberg filmography in particular. The third edition had eco-horror as its main theme.

== Awards ==
The prizes awarded at the festival are named "Wooden Frankie" and are voted by the audience. Awards are given in two main categories - Best Short Horror and Best Feature Fright.

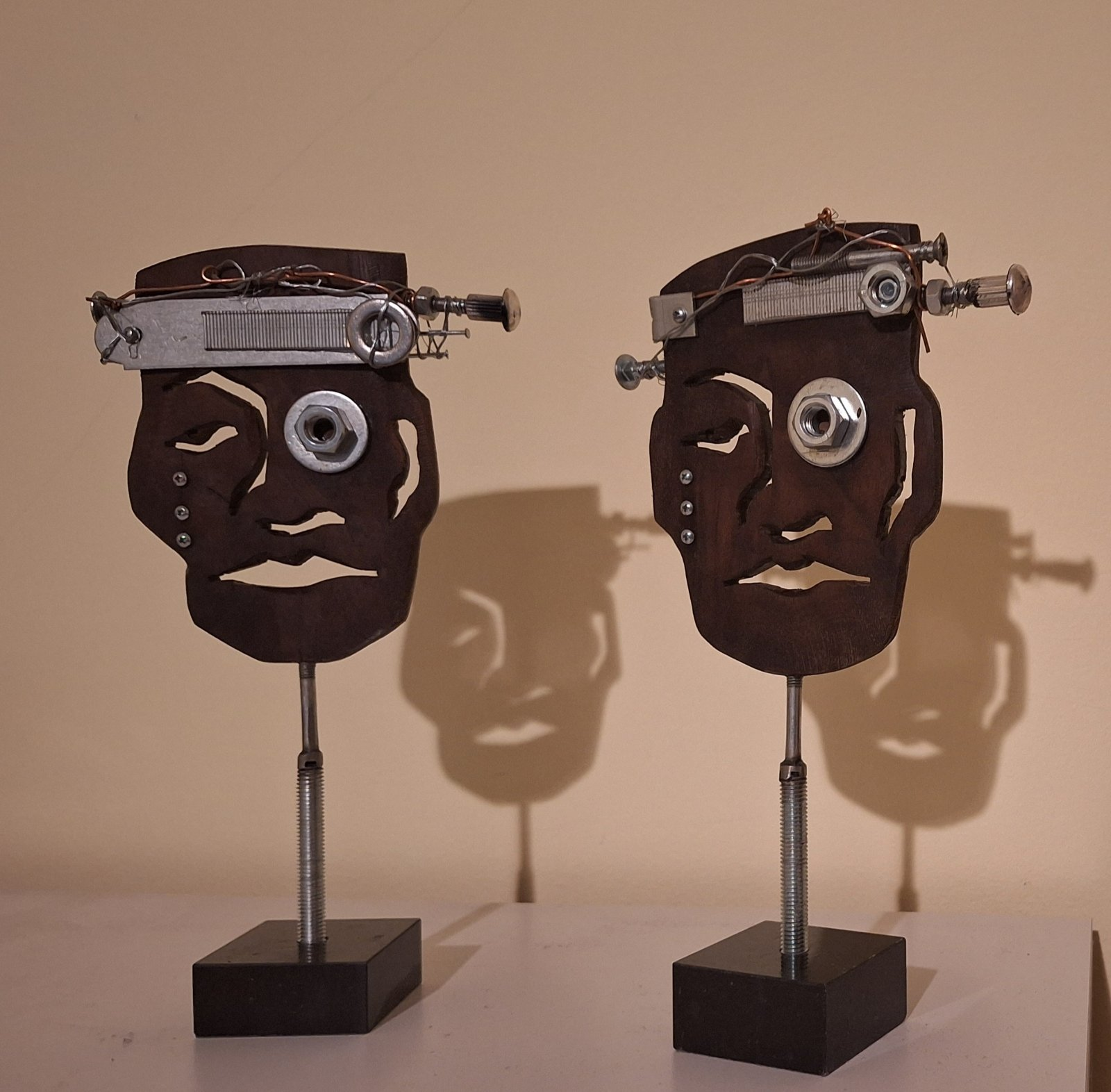
Wooden Frankie Award

=== "Wooden Frankie" Award ===
- 2026
  - Best Feature Fright: The Peril at Pincer Point
  - Best Short Horror: Gavage
- 2025
  - Best Feature Fright: El Instinto
  - Best Short Horror: Quadraturine
- 2024
  - Best Feature Fright: Mother Father Sister Brother Frank
  - Best Short Horror: Bookworm
- 2023
  - Best Feature Fright: Eight Eyes
  - Best Short Horror: In the Shadow of God

== See also ==
- List of fantastic and horror film festivals
