= Egidio Coccimiglio =

Canadian film director

Egidio Coccimiglio is a Canadian film director from Sault Ste. Marie, Ontario. He is most noted as the director of the films Compulsion (2013) and Cascade (2023).

After studying film at Ryerson University, he began his career in film as a sound technician, notably receiving a Genie Award nomination at the 9th Genie Awards in 1988 for I've Heard the Mermaids Singing. His other sound credits included the films Loyalties, Concrete Angels, The Top of His Head and South of Wawa.

He directed his first short film, American Exit, in 1989, and followed up in 1992 with Blast 'Em, a documentary film about paparazzi that he co-directed with Joseph Blasioli. He was then a director's apprentice on the 1994 film Only You. In 2003 he entered production on Imaginary Grace, which would have been his narrative feature debut, but the film was never completed or released.

In 2009 he also published the novella A Pleasant Vertigo.

His thriller films Compulsion and Cascade were both filmed in and around Sault Ste. Marie. When Cascade premiered on Netflix in summer 2023 it premiered in the Top 10 for Canadian viewership, one of the first independent Canadian films ever to do so on that platform.
