= Justin Delorme =

Canadian film and television composer

Justin Delorme is a Canadian film and television composer.

A member of the Red River Métis nation, he is based in Winnipeg, Manitoba.

He received a Canadian Screen Award nomination for Best Original Music in a Non-Fiction Program or Series at the 7th Canadian Screen Awards in 2019, for his work on the television documentary series Taken. He received two Canadian Screen Music Award nominations in 2023, in Best Original Main Title Theme Music for the feature film Diaspora, and Best Original Score for a Documentary, Factual or Reality Series or Special for "Grizzly Rewild", an episode of the television documentary series The Nature of Things.

His other credits have included the films Buffy Sainte-Marie: Carry It On, WaaPaKe, Finality of Dusk, Angela's Shadow and Ancestral Beasts, and the television series Best & Bester, Wolf Joe and Querencia. He was also one of the first contributors to Bedtracks, a project of Nagamo Publishing and the imagineNATIVE Film and Media Arts Festival to create a database of licenseable music by indigenous composers for film and television projects.
