= Steph Copeland =

Canadian musician

Steph Copeland is a Canadian musician and composer, known principally for her work on horror films.

Her credits have included the films Antisocial, Ejecta, The Drownsman, Bite, The Heretics, Vicious Fun, The Retreat, Laced, Outpost and Cascade.

== Awards ==
Award	Year	Work	Result	Ref(s)
Canadian Screen Music Awards	2022	Best Original Score for a Narrative Feature Film	The Retreat	Won
Canadian Screen Music Awards	2022	Best Original Score for a Television Special	Lethal Love	Won
Canadian Screen Music Awards	2023	Best Original Score for a Narrative Feature Film	Outpost	Won
Canadian Screen Music Awards	2023	Best Original Score for a Narrative Feature Film	Laced	Nominated
Canadian Screen Music Awards	2023	Best Original Score for a Television Special	Designing Christmas	Nominated
Canadian Screen Awards	2024	Best Original Score	Cascade	Nominated
Canadian Screen Awards	2024	Best Original Song (Television)	"Love Is a Mystery" — The Jane Mysteries: Inheritance Lost	Nominated
