= Press Play (film) =

2022 American film by Greg Björkman

- Theatrical release poster
- Directed by: Greg Björkman
- Screenplay by: Greg Björkman; James Bachelor
- Story by: Josh Boone
- Produced by: Jonathan Schwartz; Logan Lerman; Yeonu Choi; Josh Boone
- Starring: Clara Rugaard; Lewis Pullman; Lyrica Okano; Christina Chang; Matt Walsh; Danny Glover
- Cinematography: Luca Del Puppo
- Edited by: Patrick J. Don Vito
- Music by: Eldad Guetta
- Production companies: CJ Entertainment; Jalapeño Goat
- Distributed by: The Avenue
- Release date: June 24, 2022 (United States)
- Running time: 85 minutes
- Countries: United States; South Korea
- Language: English
- Box office: $216,850

Press Play is a 2022 science fiction romantic drama film directed by Greg Björkman in his feature directorial debut, from a screenplay by Björkman and James Bachelor, and based on a story by Josh Boone. Starring Clara Rugaard, Lewis Pullman, Lyrica Okano, Christina Chang, Matt Walsh, and Danny Glover, the film follows Laura (Rugaard), an aspiring artist who discovers the mixtape she made with her boyfriend Harrison (Pullman), who was fatally struck by a car four years earlier, can transport her back in time and save his life.

Press Play was theatrically released in the United States on June 24, 2022, to mixed reviews from critics.

== Plot ==
Laura's friend Chloe introduces her to her stepbrother, Harrison, who works at the record store Lost & Found. They immediately connect and attend a Japanese Breakfast show together. She meets the record store's owner, Cooper. At the beach, Harrison gifts Laura a cassette so they can create a mixtape. They celebrate after learning an art-related mentorship has accepted Laura. He mentions his intentions of moving to attend medical school but is interrupted by an earthquake. At her house, she shows him her art. Harrison's parents tell Laura that Harrison is going to a medical school on the other side of the country. Harrison privately tells Laura he does not want to go so he can stay with her. She tells him she does not want to be the reason he gives up on his dreams; he reassures her of his decision to stay. They attend her art exhibition. On his birthday, they finish painting a mural. The next day, Harrison is hit and killed by a car. Laura destroys the mural and leaves behind her mixtape at Lost & Found.

Four years later, Laura attends Chloe's wedding. Cooper gives Laura her mixtape back. She goes home to listen to it. After pressing play, Laura is transported to her first date with Harrison at the Japanese Breakfast concert. After a brief moment, she returns to the present. Every time she presses play, the mixtape sends her back in time. She does it again and appears on their date at the beach. She warns him about his future death and convinces him by predicting the earthquake seconds before it happens. In the present, she learns she is affecting the future after learning Chloe has married a different, obnoxious man instead of her soulmate. She learns Harrison had died the same day from falling off a cliff.

Her next click sends her to the time she showed Harrison her art. She warns him to stay away from the cliffs. This time, after returning, she learns Harrison died from electrocution after stepping on a downed power line. She presses play again and now appears at the party hosted at Lost & Found where they talked about their future, but her time is cut short. Her actions altered their timeline to where Lost & Found burned down with Harrison inside and the mixtape is no longer in her possession. She visits a depressed Cooper, gets the mixtape from this timeline, and tells Cooper about its powers. Cooper mentions the possibility that she is not supposed to save him but she tries anyway. Harrison still died, this time in a car accident with his dad. Once again, Laura presses play. She appears at her art exhibition. She tells Harrison to break up with her and go to medical school. In the present, she tries calling him but the call goes straight to voicemail. She immediately presses play again and appears in their last important moment: the day they finished the mural. She confronts him for not breaking up but Harrison says he would rather risk staying with her than leaving and dying anyway.

In the present, Laura forces herself to accept the fact she cannot be with Harrison. While at Chloe's, she discovers an additional song on the B-side of the cassette. The song sends her back in time to the moment they were going to meet for the first time. She decides to save his life by not stepping inside Lost & Found. In the present, a cheerful Chloe invites Laura to Christmas dinner. Chloe is married to her soulmate as the changes to the timeline have been reverted. Harrison arrives and introduces himself to Laura.

== Cast ==
- Clara Rugaard as Laura
- Lewis Pullman as Harrison
- Lyrica Okano as Chloe
- Christina Chang as Mrs. Knott
- Matt Walsh as Mr. Knott
- Danny Glover as Cooper
- Japanese Breakfast as themselves

== Soundtrack ==
- Romes ft. Haiva Ru – All The Time
- Slowdive – Sugar for the Pill
- Japanese Breakfast – Boyish
- Jesse Mailin – Greener Pastures
- Will Joseph Cook – Something to Feel Good About
- Dayglow – Can I Call You Tonight?
- Ashley Jane – How Lucky Am I
- Amy Stroup – Hold What You Can
- Father John Misty – Do You Realize
- Kina Grannis – It's Hard to Be Human
- Kimié ft. Imua Garza – Make Me Say
- Robin Kester – Day Is Done (demo)
- Conor O'Brien – Bright Yellow
- Kapono Beamer – The Manu Oo Hula
- Katyna Ranieri, Riz Ortolani – Oh My Love
- APM Music – O Christmas Tree
- The Thorns – Among the Living

== Production ==
Press Play is a romantic drama directed by Greg Björkman that incorporates music into its story. It is written by Björkman and James Bachelor from a story by Josh Boone. On October 7, 2019, CJ Entertainment announced it would produce the film starring Clara Rugaard, Lewis Pullman, Danny Glover, and Lyrica Okano. In a statement, Boone said "music has always been my magic carpet ride into the past. This story sprung from that idea — music as time travel." Björkman said "music can be such an integral part of one's life. What better way to travel back in time than through the soundtrack of your youth." Filming began that same month in Hawaii. By May 2020, the film was in post-production with music supervisor Season Kent and editor Patrick J. Don Vito. It is Björkman's feature film directorial debut.

== Release ==
In November 2021, The Avenue acquired the distribution rights. The film was released in the United States in theaters and on digital on June 24, 2022.

== Reception ==
On the review aggregator Rotten Tomatoes, 67% of 18 reviews are positive, with an average rating of 5.9/10.
