= Suad Bushnaq =

Jordanian-Canadian composer (born 1982)

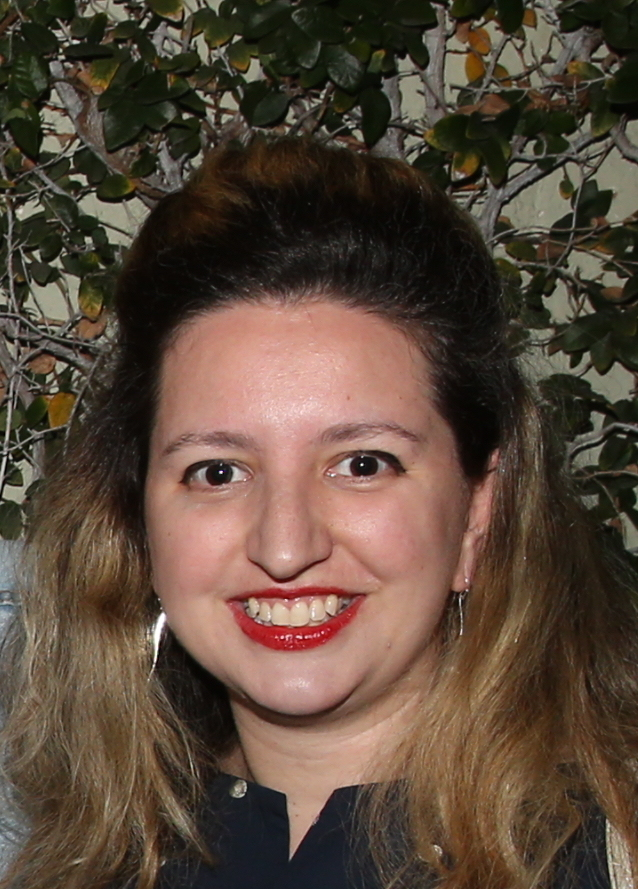

Background information
- Born: Amman, Jordan
- Genres: Film score; orchestral
- Occupation: Composer
- Years active: 2013–present
- Website: www.suadbushnaq.com

Suad Lakišić Bushnaq is a Jordanian-Canadian film and concert composer. She is best known for her work on Secret World of Sound with David Attenborough, Yunan, Flight 404, Hobal, Hanging Gardens, Crashing Eid, Hotel Beyrouth, Al Munataf (The Curve), Twice Upon a Time and Tight Spot.

== Early life ==
Suad was born and raised in Amman, Jordan, to a Syrian mother and a Bosnian-Palestinian father. She studied music at the Higher Institute of Music in Damascus, Syria, and later earned a scholarship to study music composition at McGill University, where she earned a bachelor's in music composition.

== Career ==
Suad is a member of the Screen Composers Guild of Canada and the Alliance for Women Film Composers. In 2018 she was selected as one of six composers from across Canada to participate in the Slaight Music Residency at the Canadian Film Centre. Suad won a Silver Medal for Outstanding Achievement in Original Score at the Global Music Awards for her piece The Road to Jenin. That same piece is nominated for a Hollywood Music in Media Awards in the world music category. she was nominated for the 2019 Hollywood Music in Media Awards for Best Original Score.

She received a Canadian Screen Award nomination for Best Original Score at the 10th Canadian Screen Awards in 2022, for her work on the film Jasmine Road.

== Filmography ==
=== As composer ===
- The Curve (2015)
- About Her (2015)
- Waiting In Urfa (2016)
- Twice Upon a Time (2016)
- Stadt, Licht & Bewegung (City, Light & Movement) (2016)
- (Out)caste (2017)
- Setback of the Spirit (2017)
- At Home with the Horses (2017)
- The Borrowed Dress (2018)
- The Dead Die Once (2018)
- Tight Spot (2018)
- Yasmina (2018)
- Greta Follows Rivers (2018)
- Sand. Rock. Palm. (2018)
- Emraa (2018)
- Roads of Ithriyah (2018)
- Tammy (2019)
- Colors of Resistance (2019)
- A Very Important Appointment (2019)
- Ashbridge (2019)
- Coming Home! (2020)
- Hockey Mom (2020)
- I Do, or Die - A Killer Arrangement (2020)
- Jasmine Road (2020)
- Connecting the Dots (2020)
- In Her City (2020)
- Aswat Acherim (2021)
- Qata'ef (2021)
- Body Politics (2021)
- Night (2021)
- Lovesick in the West Bank (2021)
- The Algorithm (2021)
- Road to El Kef (2021)
- Salma's Home (2022)
- Incorrigible - A film about Velma Demerson (2022)
- Montreal Girls (2022)
- Hanging Gardens (2022)
- Corvine (2022)
- Mp3 (2022)
- Queen Tut (2023)
- Yunan (2025)

== Discography ==
- Blissful State of Surrender
- From the Heart (2014)
- Thoughts (2014)
- The Curve (Original Motion Picture Soundtrack) (2017)
- A Very Important Appointment (2019)
- Salma's Home (2022)
- Hanging Gardens (2022)
- Road to El Kef (2022)
- Corvine (2023)

== Orchestral music ==
- Ghadan (Tomorrow) from Hakawaty (The Storyteller) Suite for Orchestra
- The Borrowed Dress (film score in concert)
- Narenj from Hakawaty (The Storyteller) Suite for Orchestra
