= Outpost (2022 film) =

2022 horror film directed by Joe Lo Truglio

- Theatrical release poster
- Directed by: Joe Lo Truglio
- Screenplay by: Joe Lo Truglio
- Produced by: Kara Baker; Joe Lo Truglio; Joe Mortimer
- Starring: Beth Dover; Ato Essandoh; Dylan Baker; Becky Ann Baker; Dallas Roberts
- Cinematography: Frank Barrera
- Edited by: Yang Hua Hu
- Music by: Steph Copeland
- Production companies: What's That Noise Films; Gigi Films
- Release dates: October 29, 2022 (FrightFest Halloween); May 19, 2023 (United States); October 16, 2023 (Canada)
- Running time: 89 minutes
- Country: United States
- Language: English

Outpost is a 2022 American horror film written and directed by Joe Lo Truglio in his feature directorial debut. The plot follows Kate, a victim of domestic abuse, as she begins to work inside a fire lookout tower with the hope of leaving her past behind.

Outpost premiered at the FrightFest film festival on October 29, 2022, and was theatrically released in the United States on May 19, 2023, and in Canada on October 16. The film received mostly mixed reviews.

== Plot ==
Kate, a woman having experienced domestic abuse at the hands of her husband Mike, struggles with traumatic visions and seeks to get as far away from her past as possible. Since Kate is stuck between jobs, her best friend Nickie refers her to Nickie's brother Earl, a park ranger, and Kate begins to work inside an Idaho fire lookout tower.

Distracted by one of her visions, Kate goes against protocol when she fails to report to Earl on time, something she is supposed to do twice a day. On one of her shopping trips to a local market, she meets fellow ranger Dan as well as Reggie, a man living in the mountains, whose wife Bertha has passed away from cancer. Kate continues to go against protocol as she puts out a small fire not far from her tower, since she is supposed to stay inside and make reports instead. Earl grows sick of Kate's increasingly erratic behavior and sets out to replace her after she hallucinates a big fire in the distance, which aircraft pilots find no evidence of moments later. Dan explains to Kate that Earl failed to report a fire when he was younger due to him meeting his wife instead of staying inside his tower, which then lead to the fire spreading and a pilot losing his life.

Kate's visions become more intense, leading to her accidentally throwing her keys into the nearby outhouse on one occasion. After a kind interaction with Reggie where he teaches Kate how to use an axe to chop wood, he tells her that he will leave for a while, after which Kate meets an elderly woman traveling the mountains. The two of them bond over Kate's struggles and the woman teaches Kate to shoot so that she may hunt for food. After partying in Reggie's house, the woman's skin begins to rot and she reveals herself to be Bertha, Reggie's deceased wife. The hallucinated Bertha then tells Kate that Reggie killed her, which enrages Kate.

After finding a replacement for Kate, Earl and Dan set out to the tower. On the way, they come across a decaying body on the ground. At the same time, Nickie heads out to the mountain in order to visit Kate. Reggie also returns to his home and walks into an animal trap, where Dan finds him shortly afterwards. Kate shows up and kills both men with an axe. On her way up the mountain, Nickie spots another decaying and partially eaten body hidden in the outhouse and then meets up with Earl. Kate, still fueled by her visions, tries to attack the two of them and Earl lures her on top of the tower. After a short confrontation, Nickie saves Earl by using a gun but she doesn't kill Kate. Instead, Kate remains inside her tower as the credits begin to appear.

== Cast ==
- Beth Dover as Kate, a woman in between jobs and victim of domestic abuse
- Ato Essandoh as Earl, an experienced park ranger to whom Kate makes daily reports
- Dylan Baker as Reggie, a widower who likes to live in the mountains on his own
- Becky Ann Baker as Bertha, Reggie's deceased wife
- Dallas Roberts as Dan, a fellow ranger
- Ta'Rea Campbell as Nickie, Kate's best friend and Earl's sister

== Production ==
Outpost was shot in the surrounding area of Priest Lake, Idaho. Eight out of the total sixteen days were spent on the summit of Sundance mountain and a couple more in Spokane, Washington.

== Reception ==
On review aggregator Rotten Tomatoes, the film holds an approval rating of 70% based on 30 reviews, with an average rating of 6.2/10. According to The Guardian, the film starts with an incongruously cheerful tone, then proceeds to shift into exaggerated chaos; despite this "it’s a well-conceived disintegration, with clear sight of the terrain, both outer and inner."
