= Walker Grimshaw =

Nick Walker Grimshaw, known professionally as Walker Grimshaw, is a Canadian film and television composer. He is most noted for his work on the 2021 film Dear Audrey, for which he received a Canadian Screen Award nomination for Best Original Music in a Documentary at the 11th Canadian Screen Awards in 2023, and the 2024 film The Legacy of Cloudy Falls, for which he received a Canadian Screen Award nomination for Best Original Score at the 14th Canadian Screen Awards in 2026.

He previously received two nominations at the 2022 Canadian Screen Music Awards, in the categories of Best Original Score for a Documentary Feature Film for Dear Audrey and Best Original Score for a Short Film for Monkey-Love, Please Hold.
