= Coins (composer) =

Canadian music producer and composer

- Also known as: Peter Project
- Born: Peter Chapman; August 27, 1980 (age 46); Halifax, Nova Scotia, Canada
- Origin: Toronto, Ontario, Canada
- Genres: Underground hip hop Canadian hip hop Electronic; Garage rock
- Occupations: Producer, keyboardist Composer
- Years active: 2000-present
- Labels: Fuzzy Logic Recordings; Urbnet Records; Drinkbox Studios; Ship to Shore Phonograph Co. Screaming Apple; Music for Cats
- Member of: Backburner
- Website: Official website

Peter Chapman (born August 27, 1980), also known by his stage names Coins and Peter Project, is a Canadian music producer and composer from Toronto, Ontario, best known for his record Daft Science, a free EP of Beastie Boys remixes using only Daft Punk samples, released on July 1, 2014. He is a member of the Canadian hip hop crew Backburner, played keyboards in the garage rock band The Midways as well as MPC and guitar in the live hip hop ensemble Tongue Helmet

== Daft Science ==
Daft Science is an eight-track remix album that combines Beastie Boys vocal tracks with Daft Punk music samples. The album was created in March 2014 while Chapman was on a layover in Chicago on his way to South by Southwest. On July 1, 2014, the album was released on Bandcamp, where it was downloaded roughly 400 times over two-and-a-half years. A music blog shared the album two and a half years later, inciting the dormant remix to be streamed 1.4-million times in a week. On May 4, 2017, Billboard named Daft Science one of the "Best 8 Beastie Boys Remixes."

== Original scores ==
Peter Chapman is a composer (alongside Rob Carli) for Syfy's Wynonna Earp, for which he was awarded a Canadian Screen Award for Best Original Music Score for a Series. He was also presented with a SOCAN Award for his score for HGTV's Leave It to Bryan, and an ASCAP award for his score for HGTV's Island of Bryan. He is also known for is score (alongside Maylee Todd) for the CBC/Netflix series Workin' Moms as well as Amazon Prime's The Lake.
