= Cascade (film) =

2023 Canadian thriller film

- Directed by: Egidio Coccimiglio
- Written by: Jonas Chernick; Ed Mason; Sam Ruano
- Produced by: Rosalia Chilelli; Jennifer Pun
- Starring: Sara Waisglass; Josh Cruddas; Allegra Fulton; Joel Oulette
- Cinematography: Diego Guijarro
- Edited by: Roger Mattiussi
- Music by: Steph Copeland
- Production company: Edge Entertainment
- Distributed by: Levelfilm
- Release date: July 6, 2023 (Sault Ste. Marie)
- Running time: 95 minutes
- Country: Canada
- Language: English

Cascade is a Canadian thriller film, directed by Egidio Coccimiglio and released in 2023. The film centres on a group of friends who are on a wilderness hike during which they discover a crashed plane filled with cocaine, only to be pursued by the criminal gang who arrive shortly thereafter to claim the drugs.

The film stars Sara Waisglass, Josh Cruddas, Allegra Fulton and Joel Oulette, with its supporting cast including Sadie Laflamme-Snow, Stephen Kalyn, James Cade, Greg Bryk, Matt Connors, Bart Rochon, Curtis Parker, Mark Brombacher, Joanna Douglas, John Tench, Paula Barrett, Paul Morin, Sean Discher and Cody Gamble.

The film was shot in and around Sault Ste. Marie, Ontario, in July 2021, including location shooting at Aubrey Falls.

It was released to Netflix in July 2023, following a special screening at the Galaxy Cinemas in Sault Ste. Marie on July 6. It debuted in the top ten in Canadian viewership in its first weekend, one of the first independent Canadian films ever to do so on that platform.

Steph Copeland received a Canadian Screen Award nomination for Best Original Score at the 12th Canadian Screen Awards in 2024.
