= Don't Move (2024 film) =

2024 Film by Adam Schindler and Brian Netto

- Release poster
- Directed by: Adam Schindler; Brian Netto
- Written by: TJ Cimfel; David White
- Produced by: Sam Raimi; Zainab Azizi; Alex Lebovici; Christian Mercuri; Sarah Sarandos
- Starring: Kelsey Asbille; Finn Wittrock; Moray Treadwell; Daniel Francis
- Cinematography: Zach Kuperstein
- Edited by: Josh Ethier
- Music by: Mark Korven; Michelle Osis
- Production companies: Raimi Productions; ZQ Entertainment; Capstone Studios; Hammerstone Studios
- Distributed by: Netflix
- Release date: October 25, 2024
- Running time: 92 minutes
- Country: United States
- Language: English

Don't Move is a 2024 American thriller film starring Kelsey Asbille, Finn Wittrock, Moray Treadwell, and Daniel Francis. It was directed by Adam Schindler and Brian Netto, and written by TJ Cimfel and David White. It was released on Netflix on October 25, 2024.

== Premise ==
Grieving mother Iris inadvertently comes across a serial killer, who injects her with a paralytic agent. She must escape by running, fighting and hiding before it takes full effect and her body shuts down.

== Plot ==
Iris wakes up one morning and drives to a California state park unnoticed by her sleeping husband. She grieves for her young son Mateo, who died during a family hiking trip, and has taken Mateo's toy boat to a memorial she has built at the base of a tree. While contemplating suicide at a cliff's edge, Iris is interrupted by a man called Richard.

Richard encourages her not to jump and relays his own tragic past. Iris changes her mind and follows Richard back to their parked cars. There, he attacks her with a stun device, ties her wrists and ankles with zip ties, and places her in the back of his car. After regaining consciousness, Iris frees her hands and causes Richard to crash the car. Iris manages to escape, only to discover that Richard injected her with a paralyzing agent when she was out. She escapes into the thick forest, but the effects of the drug gradually incapacitate her.

Iris is discovered by local farmer Bill, who takes her to his cabin to render aid. Richard appears at the cabin, but a suspicious Bill refuses to reveal Iris's presence and calls 911. A fight ensues between Richard and Bill. Bill is killed, and Iris reveals herself when Richard sets the cabin on fire.

Richard steals Bill's truck and returns to his car. Richard is forced to stop and get gas at a gas station. Iris manages to get the attention of a girl at the station, but her mother chastises her before the girl can speak to Iris. While driving away from the station, a highway patrol officer stops Richard's truck. A call had been made reporting the plate numbers of the truck. The officer interrogates Richard, but Richard kills him when he becomes suspicious. Richard takes Iris to a lake, intending to drown her with weights off the side of a rowboat. Iris, having partially regained her motor skills, stabs Richard in the neck and shoots him with the gun Richard took from the dead highway patrolman. In the melee, some of the bullets pierce the hull and sink the boat with the immobilized Iris.

Iris emerges from the water and manages to swim to the dock where they embarked. Richard, mortally wounded, floats ashore several yards away. Iris makes her way to him, thanks him for renewing her will to live, and walks away.

== Cast ==
- Kelsey Asbille as Iris
- Finn Wittrock as Richard
- Moray Treadwell as Bill
- Daniel Francis as Dontrell, a police officer

== Production ==
In December 2022, it was reported that Adam Schindler and Brian Netto would direct the thriller Don't Move, written by TJ Cimfel and David White. It was produced by Sam Raimi and Zainab Azizi of Raimi Productions, Christian Mercuri's Capstone Studios, Alex Lebovici of Hammerstone Studios, and Sarah Sarandos.

In May 2023, Kelsey Asbille and Finn Wittrock were cast in lead roles. Principal photography took place in Bulgaria from June to late July 2023. Two days before completion, production was granted an interim agreement to continue filming during the 2023 SAG-AFTRA strike. Mark Korven and Michelle Osis scored the film.

== Release ==
In November 2023, Signature Entertainment acquired the distribution rights for the United Kingdom and Ireland. In April 2024, Netflix bought worldwide rights. The film was released on Netflix on October 25, 2024.

== Reception ==
On the review aggregator website Rotten Tomatoes, 75% of 51 critics' reviews are positive, with an average rating of 6.1/10. The website's consensus reads: "Don't Move gets a reasonable amount of mileage out of its self-imposed limitations, making for a slight but effective thriller that'll get the blood pumping." Metacritic, which uses a weighted average, assigned the film a score of 54 out of 100, based on nine critics, indicating "mixed or average" reviews.

Ben Travis of Empire gave the film 3/5 stars, writing, "The results are consistently engaging and well-calibrated for Friday-night Netflix viewing – a bright calling card for its filmmakers, even if it isn't destined to live long in the memory." The Guardian's Benjamin Lee also gave it 3/5 stars, writing, "Don't Move doesn't quite stick the landing as smoothly as one might hope with a few too many incredulous moments... and some biffed one-liners, but there are enough heart-in-throat moments on the way there to separate this from most of the genre guff on Netflix."

=== Accolades ===
Award	Date of ceremony	Category	Nominee(s)	Result	Ref.
Saturn Awards	February 2, 2025	Best Television Presentation	Don't Move	Nominated	
