= Stephen Krecklo =

Canadian musician

Stephen Krecklo is a Canadian musician. He is most noted as a two-time Canadian Screen Award nominee for Best Original Score, receiving nods at the 8th Canadian Screen Awards in 2020 for James vs. His Future Self and at the 10th Canadian Screen Awards in 2022 for Between Waves.

His other credits have included the films The Go-Getters, Queen of the Morning Calm and Daniel's Gotta Die. He is usually, but not always, credited in collaboration with Ian LeFeuvre.

He was previously a member of the indie rock band The Carnations, and has also performed in Small Sins with his former Carnations bandmate Thomas D'Arcy.
