= Robert Carli =

- Born: February 10, 1970 (age 55); Toronto, Ontario, Canada
- Origin: Kitchener, Ontario, Canada
- Occupations: Composer, Arranger, Producer, Performer
- Instrument: Saxophone
- Years active: 1990-present
- Website: www.robcarli.com

Robert Carli (born February 10, 1970) is a Canadian film and television composer and saxophonist. He is the composer of 11 seasons of Murdoch Mysteries.

== Career ==
Carli studied composition and saxophone performance at the University of Toronto, where his principal teachers were Gustav Ciamaga and Walter Buczynski and has since become a member of their faculty. Carli also studied saxophone with David Tanner and Pat LaBarbera.

He has won five Gemini Awards (Canada), three Canadian Screen Awards, including Best Original Music Score for a TV program in 2017 for Murdoch Mysteries – A Merry Murdoch Christmas and four SOCAN Awards.

Other scoring projects include Wynonna Earp (Syfy) and the 2017 mini-series Tokyo Trial (Netflix).

Carli has been a long-time collaborator with Canadian musician Danny Michel, frequently appearing as a member of his band and performing on his recordings. In 2017. he co-produced and orchestrated Michel’s Khlebnikov album, for which they shared the 2017 Canadian Music Folk Award for Producer of the Year.

A saxophonist, keyboardist, and arranger, Carli has arranged for or performed with such artists as Barenaked Ladies, the Art of Time Ensemble Madeleine Peyroux, the Toronto Symphony Orchestra, and The National Ballet of Canada.
