= Screen Composers Guild of Canada =

The Screen Composers Guild of Canada (SCGC) (Guilde des Compositeurs Canadiens de Musique à l’Image) is a national association of professional music composers and producers for film, television and media in Canada. The SCGC has certification under the Federal Status of the Artist Act to represent the interests of all composers in Canada working on English-language productions.

== Background ==
The SCGC was first founded in 1980 as the Guild of Canadian Film Composers (GCFC) by composer and jingle producer Ben McPeek. He wanted to form an association that could demonstrate to the film and television industries that first class scores could be composed and recorded in Canada. By organizing people who had a stake in the business of composing for film and television the GCFC would raise awareness with regard to the talent available in our country. If the work was being done locally there would be considerably savings both in time and money, which was an advantage for the producers/directors. Members also knew that if they couldn’t do the job the work would go to someone locally and therefore keep the work in Canada. By keeping the work in Canada members would then have a better shot at the next job as a result of the growth of the local industry has been ingrained in our organization ever since. This idea of thinking collectively to help the community and in the long run help the individual. Subsequently, more people were hired locally the industry began to take root and less work was being sent to other countries. Ultimately when the industry flourished each of the individuals would benefit.

The original members include composers such as Glenn Morley, Harry Freedman, and Bill McCauley. The membership of the Guild was made up not only of composers but lawyers, agents, publishers such as Bob Hahn and Tony Tobias, and others who had an interest in the making of film and television music.

== Organization and Growth ==
In the early 1980s the Guild met at the Canadian Music Centre and had approximately 15 members. The original mandate was "The Guild of Canadian Film Composers is a national association of professional composers and music producers for film, television, and new media. The Guild's purpose is to further the interests of its members with respect to Canada's cultural industries and agencies, film producers and music publishers."

In the mid 1990s, the Guild created a new mandate "To improve the quality and status of music as it applies to film and television, through education and the professional development of its members and the producing community." During this period professional development took on an informal structure with members exchanging information, providing knowledge of contracts, potential jobs and negotiation tactics. The Guild also created a Composer (As Contractor)/Producer Model Agreement which has become a standard in the industry.

The GCFC received certification May 23, 2003 under the Federal Status of the Artist Act.

The Guild of Canadian Film Composers changed its name to the Screen Composers Guild of Canada in 2010 to reflect the change in the film and television industries to include media for both large and small screens, and the changes in its members' working environments and skills.

In 2013, Front Row Insurance Brokers Inc. initiated an online musical instrument insurance program for members of various Canadian music associations, including the SCGC.

In 2014 the Ontario Media Development Corporation funded a research study entitled "Baseline Study on the Membership and Industry of the Screen Composers Guild of Canada" which documented the professional environment of screen composers in Canada and serves as a baseline for subsequent studies to be measured against.

In 2022, the SCGC launched the Canadian Screen Music Awards to honour achievements in music for film, television and digital media production.

== Rights and Representation ==
The SCGC is a member of Music Creators North America (MCNA), a joint lobbying group made up of the SCGC, the Songwriters Association of Canada, the Society of Composers & Lyricists, The Council of Music Creators, The Songwriters Guild of America, Songwriters of North America, LA Branch, and La Société professionnelle des auteurs et des compositeurs du Québec. Through the MCNA, the SCGC represents music creators at CIAM, the International Music Creator advisory body for International Confederation of Societies of Authors and Composers (CISAC).

The SCGC represents the interests of music creators through the Creator's Copyright Coalition, created in 2002 as an adhoc working group to address issues related to proposed Copyright Act reforms including Bill C-32 introduced in 2010.

== Past Presidents ==
- Marvin Dolgay
- Christopher Dedrick
- Paul Hoffert
- Glenn Morley
- Ben McPeek
- John Welsman
