= Toronto After Dark Film Festival =

Film festival

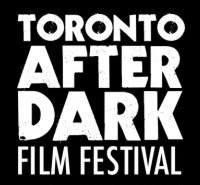
- Location: Toronto, Ontario, Canada
- Founded: 2006
- Founded by: Adam Lopez
- Language: English
- Website: torontoafterdark.com

The Toronto After Dark Film Festival (TADFF) is a showcase of horror, sci-fi, action and cult cinema held annually in Toronto, Ontario, Canada. The festival premieres a diverse selection of feature-length and short-films from around the world including new works from Asia, Europe and North America. The festival was founded by Adam Lopez in 2006.

== History ==
=== 2006 ===
The 1st Edition of the Toronto After Dark Film Festival took place October 20–24, 2006. The inaugural festival was held at the Bloor Cinema in Toronto, Ontario, Canada.

The 2006 Toronto After Dark Film Festival Official Feature Film Selections include 13 films from around the world, and 15 short films from Canada. Some of the films screened at the festival included Special, directed by Hal Haberman and Jeremy Passmorewhere, the J-horror film Retribution from cult director Kiyoshi Kurosawa, the North American premiere of the Thai action-horror film Vengeance, and Behind the Mask: The Rise of Leslie Vernon, which won the festival's first Audience Award.

Other films included The Beach Party at the Threshold of Hell, Shinobi: Heart Under Blade, Night of the Living Dorks, Re-cycle, Mad Cowgirl, Slaughter Night, and Naisu no mori: The First Contact. The festival also featured a "Make Your Own Damn Movie!" masterclass taught by Lloyd Kaufman. Festival attendance was 4,350.

=== 2007 ===
The 2nd Edition of the Toronto After Dark Film Festival took place October 19–25, 2007.

The second annual festival was held from October 19–25, 2007, at the Bloor Cinema. The festival expanded to fifty films: fourteen features and 36 short films from around the world, including 15 Canadian shorts. Festival highlights included The Tripper, directed by David Arquette; director Shinya Tsukamoto's Nightmare Detective; the premiere of Troma Entertainment's Poultrygeist: Night of the Chicken Dead; Uwe Boll's In the Name of the King: A Dungeon Siege Tale; the zombie-western short film It Came From The West; the world premiere of John Bergin's From Inside; Mulberry Street, which went on to win the festival's After Dark Spirit Award; and the Thai horror film Alone from directors Banjong Pisanthanakun and Parkpoom Wongpoom, which won the festival's annual Audience Award. Festival attendance was 6,500.

Other films included Blood Car, Wolfhound, The Rebel, Audience of One, Aachi & Ssipak, Ambassador's Day, Murder Party, Operation Fish, Terror On The 3918, Simon Says, among others.

=== 2008 ===
The 3rd Edition of the Toronto After Dark Film Festival took place October 17–24, 2008.

The third annual festival expanded to eight nights and was held from October 17–24, 2008, at the Bloor Cinema. Highlights of the third Annual Festival included sell-out screenings of Let the Right One In, Repo! The Genetic Opera, Tokyo Gore Police, and the North American Premiere of I Sell The Dead; over 30 attending filmmakers on stage to introduce their films, including Larry Fessenden (The Last Winter) and Angus Scrimm (Phantasm); packed nightly social events; positive reviews for the films programmed; and a Zombie Walk. Other films included Trailer Park of Terror, Mirageman, Idiots and Angels, Who is KK Downey?, 4bia, Brain Dead, Donkey Punch, Mutant Chronicles, and Home Movie. The festival also featured a Make Your Own Damn Movie! masterclass taught by Lloyd Kaufman. Festival attendance was over 8,500.

Over 3,500 votes were cast for the Audience Award for Best Feature Film and the Gold winner was Swedish vampire film Let the Right One In. Silver went to cult sci-fi horror musical Repo! The Genetic Opera, and Bronze was awarded by fans to the Thai supernatural anthology movie 4bia (Phobia). Awards were also handed out for Best Independent Feature Film, where the big winner was the grave-robber comedy, I Sell The Dead, and in the short film categories, winners included the Christmas tree exploitation film Treevenge.

=== 2009 ===
The 4th Edition of the Toronto After Dark Film Festival took place August 14–21, 2009.

The fourth annual festival made the move to summer, once again at the Bloor Cinema with over 9,000 fans attending the festival. Highlights included screenings of the Norwegian Nazi zombie horror-comedy Dead Snow, the horror anthology Trick 'r Treat and the cult blaxploitation action-comedy Black Dynamite, which won Gold, Silver and Bronze respectively in the Audience Choice Awards. The festival also hosted its first ever world premiere, Strigoi, an offbeat Romanian vampire comedy that was awarded by the fest Gold in the Best Independent Feature Film category. Silver and Bronze honours went to the dark comedy The Revenant and the zombie thriller, Grace, respectively.

Other films included Vampire Girl vs. Frankenstein Girl, The Warlords (starring Jet Li, Andy Lau and Takeshi Kaneshiro), Black (starring MC Jean Gab'1), Rough Cut, Franklyn (starring Ryan Phillippe and Eva Green), The Forbidden Door, Must Love Death, Someone's Knocking at the Door, The Children, Embodiment of Evil (the third film in the Coffin Joe trilogy), and The Dark Hour. Shorts After Dark (International Short Film Snowcase) comprised eleven new horror, sci-fi, action, and cult short films from around the world, including a number of international award winners. Canada After Dark (Canadian Short Film Snowcase) featured 17 "home-grown" short films (and are the opening acts for the feature films).

=== 2010 ===
The 5th Edition of the Toronto After Dark Film Festival took place August 13–20, 2010.

The fifth annual festival, once again at the Bloor Cinema with over 9,300 fans attending. Highlights included the festival's first-ever red carpet premiere for The Last Exorcism, with producer Eli Roth, stars Ashley Bell and Patrick Fabian attending, the horror film The Human Centipede, and the 2010 remake of the 1978 exploitation film I Spit On Your Grave. These three films won Gold, Silver and Bronze respectively, in the Audience Choice Awards.

Other films included The Last Lovecraft: Relic of Cthulhu, Doghouse, Evil In the Time of Heroes, Robogeisha, Alien vs Ninja, Phobia 2, Cargo, Centurion, Black Death, All About Evil, High School and Rubber.

Shorts After Dark (International Short Film Snowcase) comprised 10 new horror, sci-fi, action, and cult short films from around the world, including a number of international award winners and premieres. 2010's Best International Short Film award winners included Off Season (Gold), Pumzi (Silver), and Deus Irae (Bronze). Canada After Dark (Canadian Short Film Snowcase) featured 16 "home-grown" short films (and are the opening acts for the feature films). 2010's Best Canadian Short Film award winners included Junko's Shamisen (Gold), King Chicken (Silver), and Fireman and Game Night (tied for Bronze).

=== 2011 ===
The 6th Edition of the Toronto After Dark Film Festival took place October 20–27, 2011.

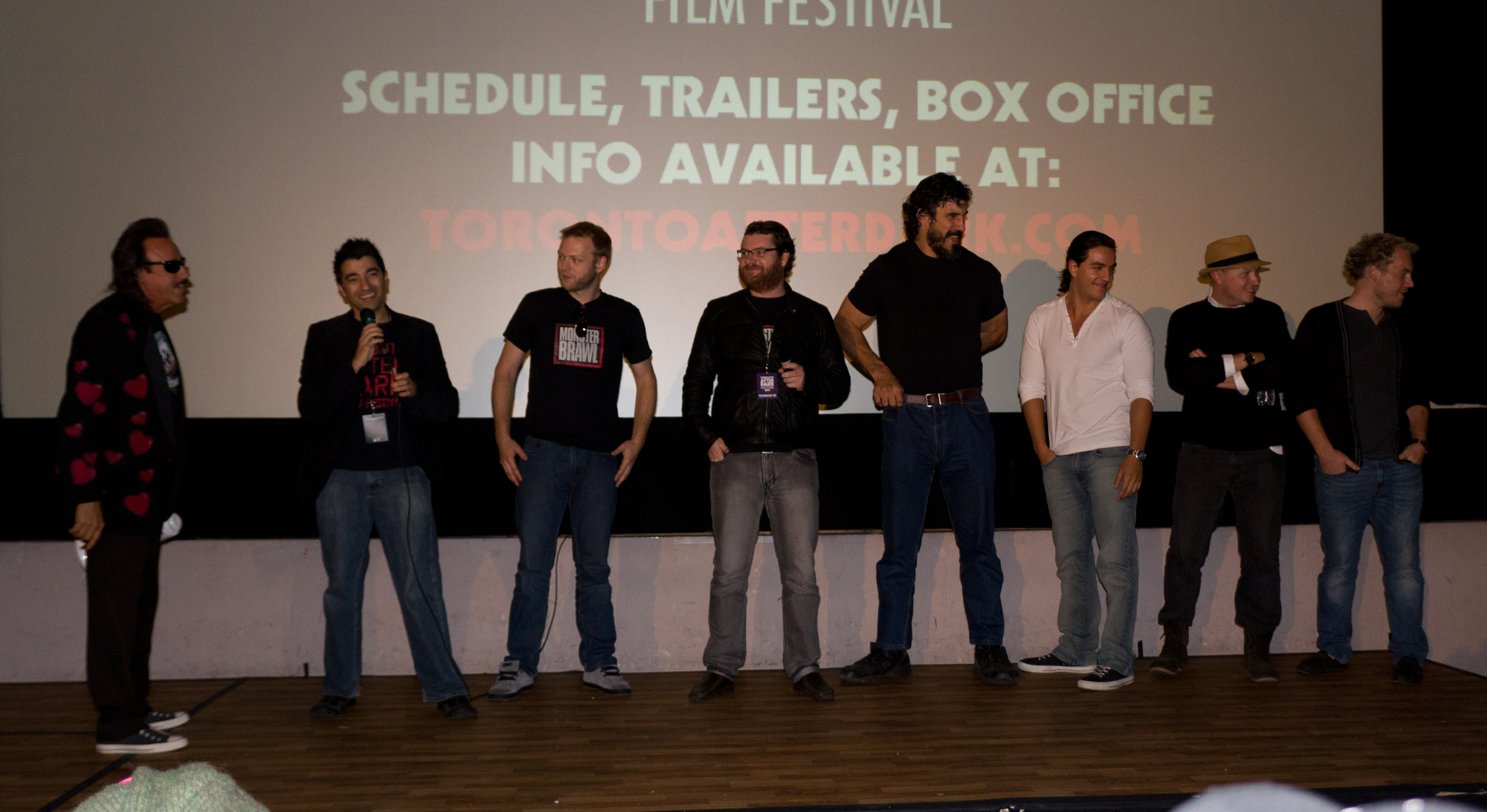
Cast and crew of the film Monster Brawl at the gala opening of the 2011 festival.

The sixth annual festival returned to October and the Halloween season for the first time in three years, at the Toronto Underground Cinema. A record number of feature films and short film submissions were received this year.

Toronto After Dark announced the first eight Official Selections of its 2011 film line-up at Fan Expo Canada on August 25, 2011, then on its official website on August 31, 2011. The films selected included Monster Brawl; Exit Humanity, a zombie saga set against the back-drop of the American Civil War; the Canadian Premiere of the Pierce Brothers' DeadHeads, a multi-genre zombie buddy film; Redline, a Japanese anime set in the world of car racing; The Theatre Bizarre, a horror anthology from such genre filmmakers as Tom Savini and Richard Stanley; the World Premiere of Father's Day, a exploitation/grindhouse story from Astron-6 and Troma; Love, a time-travel sci-fi drama; and Xavier Gens's The Divide, an apocalyptic film about the residents of a New York City apartment building.

Toronto After Dark was honoured in hosting two more World Premiere screenings. The WWII action-horror-zombie film, War of the Dead, directed by Marko Mäkilaakso and the dark, superhero thriller, VS, directed by Jason Trost (co-writer, director, and star of THE FP) and starring James Remar.

Other films include the Jack Perez's horror comedy, Some Guy Who Kills People, starring Kevin Corrigan, the vampire-drama, Midnight Son, the award-winning supernatural thriller, Absentia, the action-thriller, A Lonely Place to Die, Astron-6's sci-fi, action-comedy, Manborg, the Canadian sci-fi thriller, The Corridor, Lucky McKee's controversial film The Woman, and Ti West's haunted hotel thriller, The Innkeepers.

Astron-6's Father's Day, The Divide and DeadHeads won Gold, Silver and Bronze respectively, in the Audience Choice Awards for Best Feature Film.

=== 2012 ===
The 7th Edition of the Toronto After Dark Film Festival took place October 18–26, 2012.

The seventh annual festival saw the Toronto After Dark Film Festival return to the Bloor Cinema, which went through new ownership and a complete renovation, reopening as the, Hot Docs Ted Rogers Cinema. The festival also expanded one extra night, showcasing a total of twenty feature films and a wealth of Canadian and International short films. The Toronto After Dark Film Festival hosted two Spotlight Presentation Screening Nights Summer 2012, taking place also at Bloor Cinema, Wednesday, June 27 and Wednesday, July 11. These two evenings showcased two films each night, including Juan of the Dead, The Pact, Detention and the Canadian Premiere of V/H/S.

The 2012 Toronto After Dark Film Festival Official Selections included the Canadian Premiere of the body-modification thriller American Mary, from Vancouver-based writers, producers and directors, Sylvia and Jen Soska (otherwise known as the Soska sisters). Other selections included, the Irish alien-monster horror-comedy Grabbers; the dark crime-thriller Crave, directed by DVD and Blu-ray producer and filmmaker, Charles de Lauzirika; the British horror film Inbred; the third installment of the REC series, REC 3: Génesis; the British zombie-comedy Cockneys vs Zombies; Honor Blackman; the South Korean science-fiction anthology film Doomsday Book; the Canadian "LARP"-ing comedy Lloyd The Conqueror; the latest UniSol installment, Universal Soldier: Day of Reckoning; the dark fantasy-thriller After; the paranormal sequel Grave Encounters 2; the Irish psychological-horror film Citadel, from director, Ciaran Foy; the documentary My Amityville Horror, in which Daniel Lutz, one of the children who lived through The Amityville Horror, is interviewed; Resolution, directed by Justin Benson and Aaron Moorhead; Tony Todd, Mark Hamill, Noah Hathaway, James Duval and newcomer, Cortney Palm, highlight Kern Saxton's revenge crime-thriller, Sushi Girl; Japanese director, Noboru Iguchi's comedy-horror, Dead Sushi; the home-invasion thriller In Their Skin; and Wrong, the latest film from Quentin Dupieux (aka Mr. Oizo).

A Fantastic Fear of Everything, starring Simon Pegg, and Juan Martínez Moreno's Spanish werewolf-comedy, Game of Werewolves (Lobos de Arga), rounded out the closing night of the festival.

Cockneys vs Zombies, Dead Sushi and A Fantastic Fear of Everything won Gold, Silver and Bronze respectively, in the Audience Choice Awards for Best Feature Film.

=== 2013 ===
The 8th Edition of the Toronto After Dark Film Festival took place October 17–25, 2013.

The eighth annual edition of the Toronto After Dark Film Festival saw the festival partner with Canada's Cineplex Entertainment, for the first time, with the Scotiabank Theatre being the venue host for the festival.

The Toronto After Dark Film Festival hosted two pre-festival Screening Nights in the summer of 2013, also taking place at the Scotiabank Theatre, Thursday, August 29 and Thursday, September 26. These two evenings screened two films each night. They included, Bad Milo; V/H/S/2; the Canadian Premiere of Europa Report and, The Dirties.

The 2013 Toronto After Dark Film Festival Official Feature Film Selections include the Opening Gala film and Toronto Premiere of Jim Mickle's We Are What We Are. This marked a return to Toronto After Dark for Mickle, as his 2006 film, Mulberry Street was a previous Toronto After Dark Official Selection. Other returning Toronto After Dark alumni for 2013 included Henry Saine with Bounty Killer and Jesse Thomas Cook with Septic Man for the Canadian Premiere. Other selections included creature features Big Ass Spider! and Eega; the British zombie-comedy Stalled; the zombie-drama The Battery, directed by Jeremy Gardner; the World Premiere of the Canadian thriller Silent Retreat, directed by Tricia Lee; Don Thacker's Motivational Growth; the Canadian Premiere of Odd Thomas, directed by Stephen Sommers based on the novels by Dean Koontz; the Canadian horror-thriller Solo; the sci-fi films The Last Days on Mars and The Machine, directed by Caradog W. James; the Toronto premiere of Found, directed by Scott Schrimer; the World Premiere of the Canadian action-horror-dark comedy film Evil Feed, directed by Kimani Ray Smith; the Bigfoot found-footage thriller Willow Creek, directed by Bobcat Goldthwait; and Blair Erickson's Banshee Chapter.

Cheap Thrills rounded out the closing night of the festival along with Big Bad Wolves, a dark crime-thriller from Israel directed by Aharon Keshales and Navot Papushado, selected as the Closing Gala film; Quentin Tarantino called it the best film of 2013.

The Battery, Solo and Banshee Chapter won Gold, Silver and Bronze respectively in the Audience Choice Awards for Best Feature Film.

=== 2014 ===
The 9th Edition of the Toronto After Dark Film Festival took place October 17–25, 2014.

The ninth annual edition of the Toronto After Dark Film Festival continued to partner with Canada's Cineplex Entertainment, with their Scotiabank Theatre location in downtown Toronto, the venue partner.

The 2014 Toronto After Dark Film Festival Official Feature Film Selections include, the Opening Gala film and Toronto premiere of Gerard Johnstone's Housebound. Other selections included Suburban Gothic, directed by Richard Bates Jr. (Excision) and starring Matthew Gray Gubler, Kat Dennings and Ray Wise; the World premiere of the Canadian film, Hellmouth, directed by Toronto After Dark Alumni, John Geddes (Exit Humanity), written by Tony Burgess (Pontypool) and starring Stephen McHattie; the Canadian premiere of ABCs of Death 2, directed by several Toronto After Dark Alumni, such as Jen Soska and Sylvia Soska (American Mary), Julian Gilbey (A Lonely Place to Die), Steven Kostanski (Manborg) and Juan Martínez Moreno (Game of Werewolves); Zombeavers, who in turn are trying to eat Toronto After Dark alumni actress, Cortney Palm (Sushi Girl); Nazi zombies return in the sequel Dead Snow 2: Red vs. Dead, directed by Toronto After Dark alumni, Tommy Wirkola; the Canadian 'splasher' film The Drownsman, directed by Chad Archibald (Neverlost, Antisocial and Ejecta); the North American Premiere of Wolves, directed by David Hayter (best known as the voice of Solid Snake from the Metal Gear Solid video games); Late Phases, directed by Adrián García Bogliano (Here Comes the Devil (Ahí va el diablo)), and starring Nick Damici, Ethan Embry and Lance Guest; Elijah Wood and Sasha Grey star in Open Windows, directed by Nacho Vigalondo (Timecrimes (Los cronocrímenes)); Rinko Kikuchi stars in Kumiko, the Treasure Hunter; Predestination, directed by Michael Spierig and Peter Spierig and starring Ethan Hawke; Bradley King's Time Lapse, starring Danielle Panabaker; the Canadian premiere of Refuge, directed by Andrew Robertson; the Canadian premiere of the Australian zombie-action-comedy Wyrmwood, directed by Kiah Roache-Turner; the Canadian premiere of The Town That Dreaded Sundown, a meta-sequel of the 1976 film, directed by Alfonso Gomez-Rejon; and the Canadian premiere of the documentary Why Horror?

The UK film Let Us Prey, starring The Woman's Pollyanna McIntosh rounded out the closing night of the festival, along with The Babadook, a creepy psychological-horror from Australia directed by Jennifer Kent, selected as the Closing Gala film.

Dead Snow 2: Red vs. Dead, Predestination and Why Horror? won Gold, Silver and Bronze respectively in the Audience Choice Awards for Best Feature Film.

The Canadian short films screened during the festival include, Foxed!, Young Blood, Pupa, Lumberjacked, Day 40, Period Piece, Kismet, Rose In Bloom, Dead Hearts, The Monitor, Migration, What Doesn't Kill You, Honor Code, Monster Island, Lazy Boyz, Satan's Dolls, Last Breath, Little Matthew and Intruders.

Period Piece, Dead Hearts and Satan's Dolls won Gold, Silver and Bronze respectively in the Audience Choice Awards for Best Canadian Short Film.

The International short films screened during the festival include, Invaders, Everything and Everything and Everything, Sword fights, Happy B-Day, Strange Thing, He Took Off His Skin For Me, Liquid, Redaction and Dynamic Venus.

Invaders, Happy B-Day and He Took Off His Skin For Me won Gold, Silver and Bronze respectively in the Audience Choice Awards for Best International Short Film.

=== 2015 ===
The 10th Edition of the Toronto After Dark Film Festival took place October 15–23, 2015.

The 2015 Toronto After Dark Film Festival Official Feature Film Selections include the horror anthology, Tales of Halloween, The Hallow, Synchronicity, Lazer Team, Night of the Living Deb, A Christmas Horror Story, Shut In, The Hollow One, The Demolisher, The Diabolical, The Interior, Backtrack, Gridlocked, Nina Forever, The Hexecutioners, Tag, Love & Peace, Patchwork, and Deathgasm.

=== 2016 ===
The 11th Edition of the Toronto After Dark Film Festival took place October 13–21, 2016.

The 2016 Toronto After Dark Film Festival Official Feature Film Selections include the Iranian supernatural thriller, Under The Shadow, Trash Fire, War On Everyone, Let Her Out, The Rezort, Train To Busan, Kill Command, In A Valley of Violence, Blood Father, I Am Not a Serial Killer, Bed Of The Dead, As The Gods Will, Creepy, Antibirth, Stake Land 2, The Master Cleanse, From A House On Willow Street, The Lure and The Void. The festival also included a showing of ten short films in the horror, science fiction and cult genres.

=== 2017 ===
The 12th Edition of the Toronto After Dark Film Festival took place October 12–20, 2017.

The 2017 Toronto After Dark Film Festival Official Feature Film Selections include the science fiction sequel, Beyond Skyline; Cold Hell, Cult of Chucky, Dead Shack, Defective, Eat Local, The Endless, Game of Death, Impossible Horror, Lowlife, Mayhem, My Friend Dahmer, Poor Agnes, Rabbit, Sixty Minutes to Midnight, Trench 11, Victor Crowley, The Villainess, and Tragedy Girls.

=== 2018 ===
The 13th Edition of the Toronto After Dark Film Festival took place October 11–19, 2018.

The 2018 Toronto After Dark Film Festival Official Feature Film Selections include; Anna and the Apocalypse, The Dark, Extracurricular, I Am A Hero, I'll Take Your Dead, The Inhabitant, Lifechanger, Luz, Mega Time Squad, Nightmare Cinema; the Canadian Premiere of the WWII action zombie film, Overlord; Prey, Prospect, The Ranger, Robbery, Satan's Slaves, Tigers Are Not Afraid, and You Might Be A Killer.

=== 2019 ===
The 14th Edition of the Toronto After Dark Film Festival took place October 17–25, 2019.

The 2019 Toronto After Dark Film Festival Official Feature Film Selections include the Irish supernatural comedy, Extra Ordinary (as the Opening Night Gala film); Witches in the Woods; the science-fiction film, Blood Machines, directed by Seth Ickerman and scored by Carpenter Brut, based upon the successful Kickstarter campaign; the Canadian science-fiction comedy, James vs. His Future Self, starring Daniel Stern, Jonas Chernick, Cleopatra Coleman and Frances Conroy; the South Korean zombie comedy, The Odd Family: Zombie on Sale; the bonkers insanity of, Mutant Blast (acquired and distributed via our friends with Troma Entertainment); the Australian slasher, The Furies; Making Monsters; Paradise Hills (starring Emma Roberts, Awkwafina, Eiza González, and Milla Jovovich); the World Premiere of the Canadian action film, Contracts; the South African supernatural thriller, 8 (which has since been retitled as, The Soul Collector); Homewrecker; the exorcism thriller, The Assent; the horror anthology, The Mortuary Collection, starring Clancy Brown; the Polish WWII thriller, Werewolf (Wilkolak); the World Premiere of the Canadian science-fiction, Enhanced; the dark comedy, Come to Daddy, starring Elijah Wood and Stephen McHattie; and, The Wretched (as the Closing Night Gala film), directed by Brett and Drew Pierce (Deadheads).

Official Selections for the Canadian Shorts After Dark program, included seven films from around the country 2019 Canadian Shorts: Alaska, Best Friends Forever, Imagine A World, Moment, No One Will Ever Believe You, Plainsong, and Zombies And Indians.

An additional eighteen Canadian short films were selected to screen before each feature film during the festival 2019 Canadian Pre-Feature Shorts. Official Selections included, We Three Queens, Eyes Open, Far Horizon, Make Me A Sandwich, Ocimokw! (Go Away!), Grave Sight, Down The Rabbit Hole, Hearth, Barbara-Anne, The Lightsaber Maker, Kakashat, A Noise That Carries, Schism, Peel, Eilid And Damh, Dark Before Dawn: Convoy, Patterns, and The Changeling.

Official Selections for the International Shorts After Dark program, included eight films from around the world 2019 International Shorts: Bar Fight, Eject, Maggie May, Place, Puzzle, La Noria, The Haunted Swordsman and Your Last Day On Earth. Additionally, billed as a "Sci-Fi Mini-Showcase", three additional international short films; Flip, Furnace, and, Turbo Killer, were screened with the feature film, Blood Machines.

=== 2020–2021 ===
Due to the COVID-19 pandemic, the 15th Edition of the festival, which was scheduled for October 15–23, 2020, was postponed.

The 15th Edition of the Toronto After Dark Film Festival took place October 13–17, 2021. For the first time, it was organized be an all-virtual event called, Toronto After Dark At Home, with all 12 official selections available to watch right across Canada, powered by the Eventive platform - a Video on Demand (VOD) streaming service.

=== 2022 ===
The 16th Edition of the Toronto After Dark Film Festival took place October 19–23, 2022.

=== 2023 ===
The 17th Edition of the Toronto After Dark Film Festival took place October 18–22, 2023.

=== 2024–2025 ===
Because of health issues, Adam Lopez, the festival's founder and director, postponed the 18th Edition from 2024 to 2025. He stepped down as director, and in 2025, died after battling cancer.

The 18th Edition of the Toronto After Dark Film Festival took place October 15–19, 2025.

== See also ==
- List of fantastic and horror film festivals
- Fantasia International Film Festival
- European Fantastic Film Festivals Federation
