= Pontypool (disambiguation) =

Pontypool is a town in Wales, United Kingdom.

Pontypool may also refer to:

- Pontypool (UK Parliament constituency) which had included the Welsh town.
- Pontypool RFC, Welsh rugby union team from Pontypool.
- Pontypool, Ontario, Canada - named for the Welsh town and birthplace of their first settlers.
- Pontypool (film), 2008 Canadian horror film set in the Canadian village of Pontypool.

== See also ==
- Pontypool Changes Everything, 1995 fiction novel
