= Ari Millen =

Canadian actor

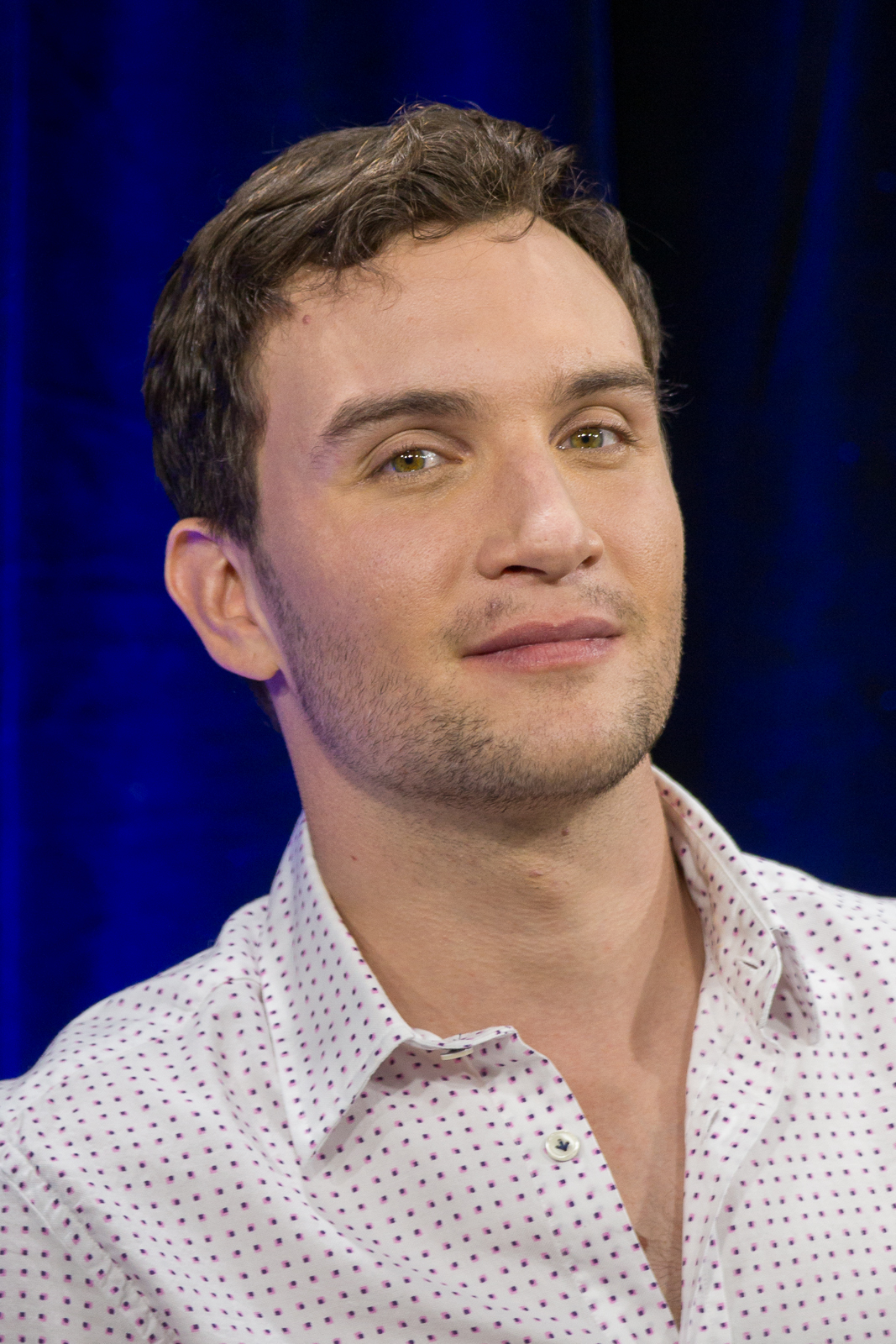
- Millen in 2015
- Born: January 19, 1982 (age 44); Kingston, Ontario, Canada
- Occupation: Actor
- Years active: 2007–present

Ari Millen (born January 19, 1982) is a Canadian actor. He is best known for his performance as numerous clones in the Space and BBC America science fiction television series Orphan Black (2014–2017), for which he won a Canadian Screen Award in 2016.

== Early life ==
Millen was born in Kingston, Ontario. As a child he aspired to play in the National Hockey League until, at the age of 17, a friend offered him a part in a small play and he decided to pursue performing arts instead. In secondary school at Kingston Collegiate and Vocational Institute, he spent his Ontario Academic Credit year studying theatre. He subsequently attended Ryerson University (now Toronto Metropolitan University)'s Theatre School and graduated in 2007 with a Bachelor of Fine Arts.

== Career ==
Millen signed with a talent agency in his fourth year of university, and one of his first roles was in a 2008 episode of the television series ReGenesis. In September 2008, he appeared in a Halifax production of Vern Thiessen's play Vimy, and in December 2008, he was cast in The Veil, a play written by Shahin Sayadi. The Veil opened in Halifax before relocating to Iran in January 2009, where the play was featured in Tehran's Fajr International Theatre Festival. From 2010 to 2013, Millen appeared in a variety of small roles in the television series Nikita, Rookie Blue and State of Syn, as well as the horror films Monster Brawl and Exit Humanity.

In August 2013 he successfully auditioned for a role on the second season of the science fiction series Orphan Black, after two unsuccessful auditions during the show's first season. It was announced in October 2013 that he had got the role of Mark. He spent six months filming Orphan Black's second season, which aired in 2014, and returned for the third season in 2015. He was upgraded to the main cast in roles depicting the various Castor clones. At Paley Fest on October 18, 2015, it was confirmed that Millen would be returning for season four. He made a guest appearance in Reign in 2014.

In 2016, Millen won a Canadian Screen Award for his work on Orphan Black.

== Filmography ==
=== Film ===
Year	Title	Role	Notes
2008	Makeout!	Unknown	Short
2011	Monster Brawl	Dr. Igora	
2011	Exit Humanity	Wayne	
2012	Embryonic	Chad Konerko	
2014	Ejecta	Agent Rudder	
2014	Hellmouth	Harry	
2015	Farhope Tower	Henry	
2015	The Hexecutioners	Charles Ivey	
2016	Rupture	Dr. Raxlen	
2017	Darken	Martin	
2017	Hunter's Moon	Remy	
2018	The Death and Life of John F. Donovan	Big Billy	
2018	I'll Take Your Dead	Reggie	
2020	The Oak Room	Michael	
2020	Vicious Fun	Bob	
2023	The Boy in the Woods	Aleksey	
2026	Ice Cream Man	Jonathan Smiley / the Ice Cream Man	

=== Television ===
Year	Title	Role	Notes
2007	The Smart Woman Survival Guide	Airport Security	Episode #3.39
2008	ReGenesis	Greg Fitzsimmons	Episode #4.6
2010	Nikita	Ronnie	Episode #1.2
2012	Rookie Blue	Taylor 'TK' Hickman	Episode #3.6
2013	State of Syn	Hawk	4 episodes
2013	Darknet	Jack the Thug	Episode #1.6
2013	Played	Liam	Episode #1.8
2014	Katie Chats	Himself	2 episodes
2014	Reign	Fake King Francis/Roger	Episode #2.6
2014-17	Orphan Black	Mark Rollins / Ira / Various	Recurring (season 2), main (seasons 3–5)
2015	Buzz: AT&T Original Documentaries	Himself	1 episode
2015	12 Monkeys	Adam Wexler	2 episodes
2016	11.22.63	Dickie	Episode #1.2
2016	Canadian Screen Awards	Himself	Television Special
2017	Murdoch Mysteries	Agent Tanner	Episode #10.14
2018	The Expanse	Stanni	3 episodes
2020	Hudson and Rex	Kai Dunn	1 episode
