= Chad Archibald =

Canadian director and producer

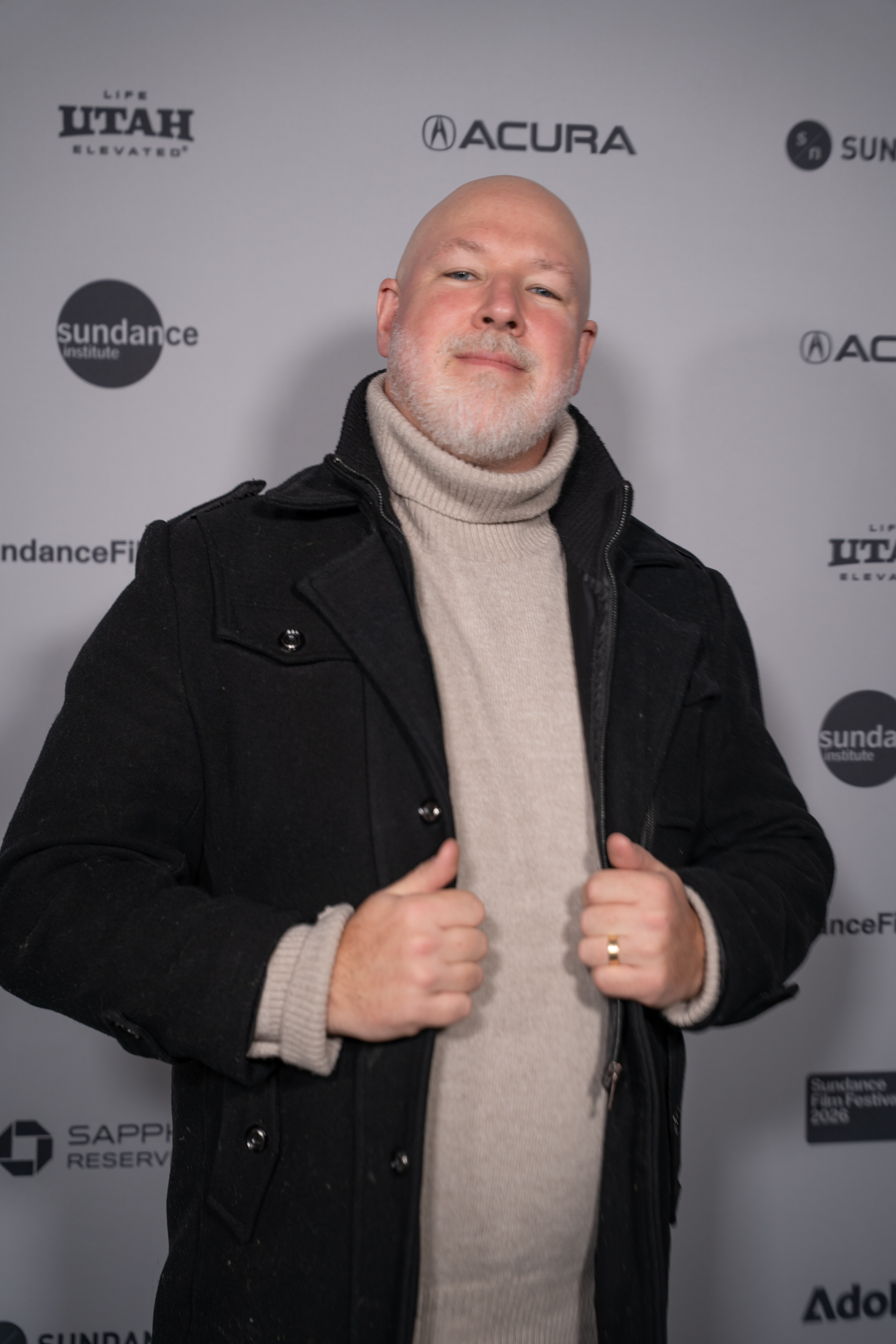
Chad Archibald 2026

Chad Archibald (born 30 July 1981) is a Canadian film, television and music video producer and director.

== Filmography ==
=== Film ===
- Kill (2007)
- If A Tree Falls (2009) (Producer)
- Bounty Hunters (2010) (Producer)
- Neverlost (2011)
- Antisocial (2013) (Producer)
- The Drownsman (2014)
- Ejecta (2014)
- Hellmouth (2014) (Producer)
- Septic Man (2014) (Producer)
- Antisocial 2 (2015) (Producer)
- The Sublet (2015) (Producer)
- Bite (2015)
- Bed of the Dead (2016) (Producer)
- Let Her Out (2016) (Producer)
- The Heretics (2017)
- I'll Take Your Dead (2019)
- The Oak Room (2020) (Producer)
- Vicious Fun (2021) (Producer)
- It Feeds (2025)

=== Television ===
- Creepy Canada (2006, 6 episodes)
- The Haunted Museum (2022, 3 episodes)
