= Walter Borden =

Canadian actor, poet and playwright (born 1942)

Walter Borden CM ONS
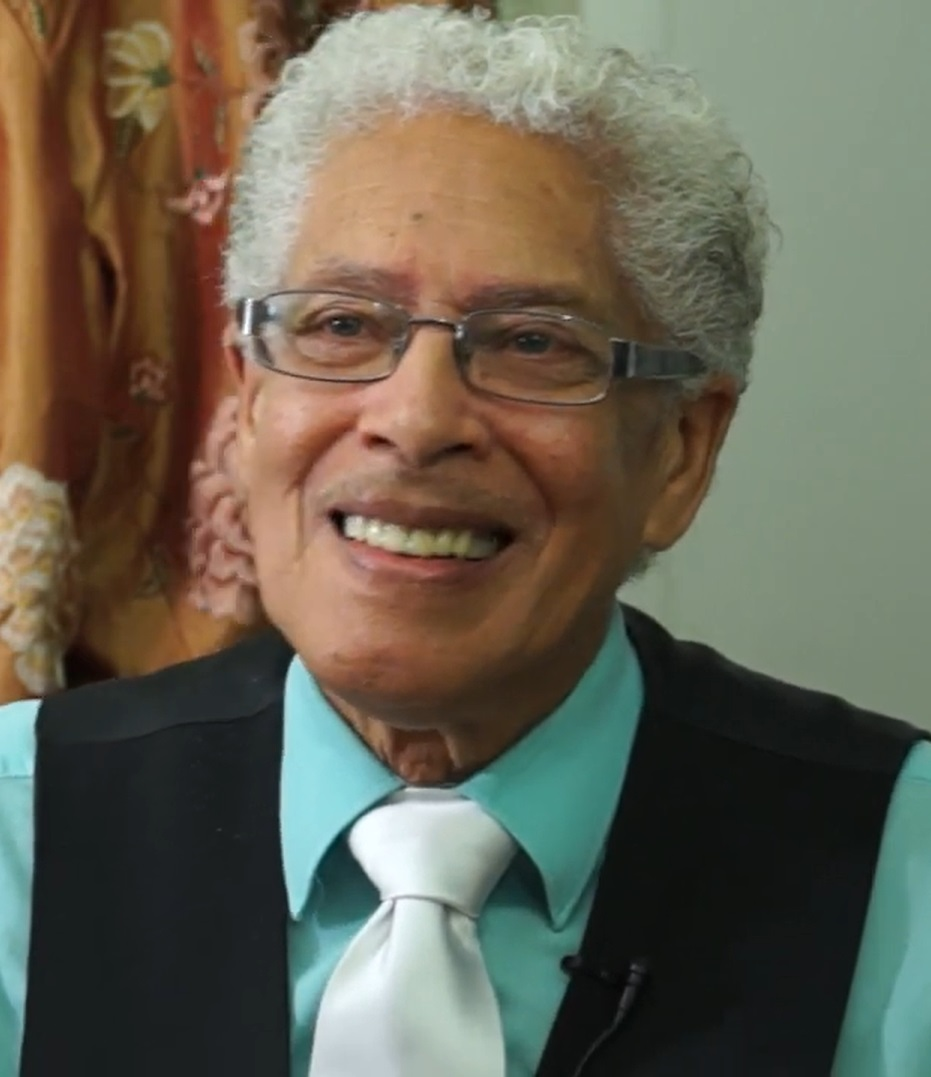
- Borden in 2018
- Born: Walter Marven Borden; July 20, 1942 (age 83); New Glasgow, Nova Scotia, Canada
- Occupations: Actor, poet, playwright

Walter Marven Borden CM ONS (born July 20, 1942) is a Canadian actor, poet, and playwright. He is originally from New Glasgow, Nova Scotia. His film and television credits include Nurse.Fighter.Boy, The Event, Gerontophilia, Lexx and Platinum.

Most prominent as a stage actor, he joined Halifax's Neptune Theatre company in 1972. He has since appeared in stage productions across Canada, including William Shakespeare's Hamlet, Richard III, A Midsummer Night's Dream, The Merchant of Venice and Henry VIII, Aeschylus' Agamemnon, Jean-Paul Sartre's The Flies, James Weldon Johnson's God's Trombones: Seven Negro Sermons in Verse, Tennessee Williams' Orpheus Descending and Cat on a Hot Tin Roof, and Djanet Sears' Harlem Duet and The Adventures of a Black Girl in Search of God. Since 2003, he has been a member of the Stratford Festival of Canada.

He has also recorded and released an album, Walter Borden Reads Shakespeare's Sonnets to the Music of Fernando Sor, in collaboration with classical guitarist Paul Martell.

== Personal life ==
Openly gay, he also wrote and performed his own autobiographical play Tightrope Time: Ain't Nuthin' More Than Some Itty Bitty Madness Between Twilight and Dawn, one of the first plays in the history of Black Canadian literature to directly present themes of male homosexuality.

In 2023, the "tour de force" work The Last Epistle of Tightrope Time had a cross-provincial showing from Halifax, Toronto to Ottawa directed by virtuoso director Peter Hinton-Davis It was later published by Nimbus Publishing

His later writing credits include Testifyin' and Tellin' It Like It Is.

== Filmography ==
=== Film ===
| Year | Title | Role | Notes |
|---|---|---|---|
| 1998 | One Heart Broken Into Song | Reverend Skinner | |
| 2000 | Our Daily Bread | Sam Downey | (TV Movie) |
| 2000 | Blessed Stranger: After Flight 111 | Grieving Father | (TV Movie) |
| 2001 | The Feast of All Saints | Grampere Lermontant | (TV Movie) |
| 2001 | Passion and Prejudice | Mr. Peterson | (TV Movie) |
| 2003 | The Event | Fred | |
| 2008 | Nurse.Fighter.Boy | Horace | |
| 2012 | 100 Musicians | Narration (voice) | (Short film) |
| 2013 | Gerontophilia | Melvyn Peabody | directed by Bruce LaBruce |
| 2013 | A Dark Matter | The Demon | |
| 2015 | Grandpa Was Here | Grandpa | (Short film) |
| 2015 | The Hexecutioners | Mr. Poole | written by Tony Burgess, directed by Milos Somborac |
| 2012 | GUION | John Brice | (Short film) |

=== Television ===
| Year | Title | Role | Notes |
|---|---|---|---|
| 1996-1997 | Lexx: The Dark Zone Stories | His Divine Shadow | 2 episodes |
| 1997-2002 | Lexx | His Divine Shadow / Dr. Ernst Longbore / Dr. Ernst W. Longbore | 9 episodes, part of main cast |
| 2003 | Platinum | Alderman Ray | 1 episode, aired on UPN |
| 2004-2005 | Da Boom Crew | Additional voices | 13 episodes, Canadian/American children's television animated series |
| 2020 | Coroner | Harold Carruthers | 1 episode |

== Awards ==
Borden was awarded the Queen Elizabeth II Golden Jubilee Medal, the African Nova Scotian Music Association (ANSMA) Music Heritage Award, and the Portia White Prize, which is awarded annually by the Nova Scotia Arts Council to someone who has made a significant contribution to culture and the arts in Nova Scotia. He was named a Member of the Order of Canada in 2006. In 2007, Borden was awarded the Martin Luther King Jr. Achievement Award for his prominence as a theater actor.
