= Exit Humanity =

- Directed by: John Geddes
- Written by: John Geddes
- Produced by: Jesse Thomas Cook; John Geddes; Matt Wiele
- Starring: Mark Gibson; Adam Seybold; Jordan Hayes; Dee Wallace; Bill Moseley; Stephen McHattie; Ari Millen; Jason David Brown
- Cinematography: Brendan Uegama
- Edited by: John Geddes
- Music by: Jeff Graville; Nate Kreiswirth; Ben Nudds
- Production companies: Eggplant Picture & Sound; Foresight Features; Optix Digital Pictures
- Release dates: 18 September 2011 (Lund International Fantastic Film Festival); 8 May 2012 (Netherlands, DVD); 19 June 2012 (Canada, DVD)
- Running time: 114 minutes
- Country: Canada
- Language: English

Exit Humanity is a 2011 Canadian period zombie horror film directed by John Geddes, starring Mark Gibson, Adam Seybold, Jordan Hayes, Dee Wallace, Bill Moseley, Stephen McHattie, Ari Millen and Jason David Brown.

== Cast ==
- Mark Gibson as Edward Young
- Adam Seybold as Isaac
- Jordan Hayes as Emma
- Dee Wallace as Eve
- Bill Moseley as General Williams
- Stephen McHattie as Medic Johnson
- Ari Millen as Wayne
- Jason David Brown as Roy
- Brian Cox as Malcolm Young (voice)
- Sarah Stunt as Julia Young
- Christian Martyn as Adam Young
- John Geddes as Cliff
- Jesse Thomas Cook as Hank
- Matt Griffin as Charles
- Tony Burgess as Victim

== Reception ==
Dread Central rated the film 3 stars out of 5 and wrote that it has "more heart than guts and more brains than braaaiiins."

Dennis Harvey of Variety wrote while the film is "handsomely shot" and "merits appreciation for really trying something different", its "humorless, sometimes ponderous progress doesn't ultimately make complete sense of the period/undead combo."

Simon Kinnear of Total Film called the film a "sub-Cold Mountain travelogue beset by tedious talk, stiff performances and zero menace."

Matthew Lee of Screen Anarchy wrote: "Technically inept, artistically overstuffed, bafflingly overwrought and unintentionally hysterical its cast and crew are clearly trying pretty hard, but virtually none of it comes to anything."
