= Cult Hero (film) =

2022 Canadian comedy thriller film

- Directed by: Jesse Thomas Cook
- Written by: Kevin Revie; Liv Collins; Jesse Thomas Cook; Tony Burgess
- Produced by: Craig Shouldice
- Starring: Liv Collins; Ry Barrett; Tony Burgess; Justin Bott
- Cinematography: Kenny MacLaughlin
- Edited by: Mike Gallant
- Music by: Adrian Ellis
- Production company: Collingwood Film Co.
- Distributed by: Raven Banner Entertainment
- Release date: September 30, 2022 (Fantasia)
- Running time: 94 minutes
- Country: Canada
- Language: English

Cult Hero is a Canadian thriller comedy film, directed by Jesse Thomas Cook and released in 2022. The film stars Liv Collins as Kallie Jones, a real estate agent and stereotypical "Karen" in Owen Sound, Ontario, whose husband Brad (Justin Bott) gets drawn into a death cult led by Master Jagori (Tony Burgess), forcing her to team up with "cult buster" Dale Domazar (Ry Barrett) to rescue him.

The cast also includes Jessica Vano, Charlie Baker, Jonathan Craig, Justin Darmanin, Steve Kasan, Michael Masurkevitch, Marcia Alderson, Zoë Woodrow, Matt Griffin, Ross Docherty, James Mercier, Alex Bonwick, Donna Henry and Greg Collins.

== Production and distribution ==
The film was shot in and around Owen Sound in fall 2021.

The film was screened for distributors in the Frontières program at the Marché du Film in May 2022, prior to its public premiere on July 30, 2022, at the Fantasia International Film Festival.

== Awards ==
Award	Date of ceremony	Category	Recipient(s)	Result	Ref(s)
Fantasia International Film Festival	2022	Audience Award, Canadian Feature	Cult Hero	Runner-up	
Canadian Screen Awards	2023	Best Art Direction/Production Design	Dan Herrick, Zoë Woodrow	Nominated	
Canadian Screen Awards	2023	Best Costume Design	Carrie Cathrae-Keeling	Nominated	
Canadian Screen Awards	2023	Best Original Score	Adrian Ellis	Nominated	
Canadian Screen Awards	2023	Best Original Song	Tony Burgess, Chuck Baker — "The Ascension Song"	Nominated	
Canadian Screen Awards	2023	Best Makeup	Katie Ballantyne, Jonathan Craig	Nominated	
Canadian Screen Awards	2023	Best Visual Effects	James Anthony Young	Nominated	
