= Dreamland (2019 Canadian film) =

2019 Canadian film

- Film poster
- Directed by: Bruce McDonald
- Written by: Tony Burgess; Patrick Whistler
- Produced by: Jesus Gonzalez-Elvira; Sebastian Schelenz
- Starring: Stephen McHattie; Juliette Lewis; Henry Rollins; Tómas Lemarquis
- Cinematography: Richard Van Oosterhout
- Edited by: Duff Smith
- Music by: Jonathan Goldsmith
- Production companies: Calach Films; Goodbye Productions; Velvet Films
- Distributed by: A71 Entertainment; Dark Star Pictures
- Release date: April 14, 2019 (BIFFF)
- Running time: 92 minutes
- Country: Canada
- Language: English

Dreamland is a 2019 Canadian fantasy drama-thriller film, directed by Bruce McDonald. The film stars Stephen McHattie in a dual role as The Maestro, a jazz musician who has been hired by the Countess (Juliette Lewis) to play at the wedding of her vampire brother (Tómas Lemarquis), and Johnny Deadeyes, a hitman who has been hired by crime boss Hercules (Henry Rollins) to kill the musician.

The film has been described as a "spinoff" of McDonald's 2008 film Pontypool, in that it jumps off from the post-credits scene in Pontypool in which McHattie and Lisa Houle were depicted in period garb speaking a foreign language.

The film premiered at the Brussels International Fantastic Film Festival in 2019, and was screened at various film festivals before going into commercial release in 2020. It received mixed reviews from critics who noted the lack of coherence.

== Production ==
The film was shot in Belgium and Luxembourg. Its score was composed principally by Jonathan Goldsmith, although it also includes a jazz-based arrangement of Eurythmics' 1999 single "I Saved the World Today".

Although not named within the film, the character of the jazz musician was loosely based on Chet Baker.

== Critical response ==
Review aggregator Rotten Tomatoes reports a positive score of 54% with rating average of 5.8/10 based on 37 reviews. The critics' consensus states: "While it may entrance audiences in search of the thoroughly strange, Dreamland lives down to its title by failing to cohere in any meaningful way."

Alex Rose of Cult MTL wrote that "Though it would be simple to just call Dreamland second-rate Lynch and leave it at that, there’s both more going on here and less lofty ideals than one might expect. Where a lot of these films (recent examples off the top of my head include Terminal, Passion Play, Hotel Artemis and Mute) fail is in their absolute lack of a sense of humour; even the ones that are would-be black comedies tend to fall completely up their own assholes in a smug acceptance of irony as the end-all be-all. Dreamland, to its complete and utter benefit, is a film that both wallows in grotesque clichés and seeks to upend them."

For That Shelf, Pat Mullen opined that "There’s some promise to the ludicrously violent doppelgänger schadenfreude between the McHatties. However, the all-over-the-map screenplay veers in too many directions. Dreamland evokes the hazy fever of a midnight madness flick. It flows in and out of scenes like a woozy couch potato channel-surfing at 2 AM...Dreamland often feels weird simply for the sake of being weird. One can only imagine which drugs had higher potency: the ones that fuelled the screenplay or the ones McDonald downed before reading it."

Chris Knight of Postmedia wrote that "It's the kind of film that would have killed at the Toronto festival's Midnight Madness program, and it may have a harder time finding its audience in the scattered realm of VOD. But its boozy, Chet-Baker-meets-Eurythmics vibe (just wait for The Maestro's closing number) makes it a late-night trip worth taking."
