= The Hexecutioners =

- Directed by: Jesse Thomas Cook
- Written by: Tony Burgess
- Produced by: Jesse Thomas Cook; John Geddes; Matt Wiele
- Starring: Liv Collins; Sarah Power; Timothy Burd; Ari Millen; Barry Flatman; Walter Borden; Boyd Banks; Tony Burgess
- Cinematography: Karl Janisse
- Edited by: Jesse Thomas Cook; Sydney Cowper
- Music by: Steph Copeland
- Production company: Foresight Features
- Distributed by: Raven Banner Entertainment
- Release dates: 21 October 2015 (Toronto After Dark Film Festival); 30 May 2016 (UK, DVD); 10 January 2017 (Canada, DVD)
- Running time: 97 minutes
- Country: Canada
- Language: English

The Hexecutioners is a 2015 Canadian horror film directed by Jesse Thomas Cook and written by Tony Burgess, starring Liv Collins, Sarah Power, Timothy Burd, Ari Millen, Barry Flatman, Walter Borden, Boyd Banks and Burgess.

== Cast ==
- Liv Collins as Malison McCourt
- Sarah Power as Olivia Bletcher
- Timothy Burd as Edgar Birde
- Ari Millen as Charles Ivey
- Barry Flatman as Mr. Winston
- Walter Borden as Mr. Poole
- Boyd Banks as Mr. Giroux
- Tony Burgess as Milos Somborac
- Jason David Brown as Young Somborac
- Katherine Bell as Mrs. Giroux
- Matt Griffin as Sick Man
- Gwynda McKee as Mother
- Griffin Jones-Burgess as Young Edgar
- Camille Jones-Burgess as Girl

== Release ==
The film premiered at the Toronto After Dark Film Festival on 21 October 2015.

== Reception ==
Howard Gorman of Dread Central rated the film 4 stars out of 5 and wrote: "The real secret to the film’s success lies in the versatile performances – pretty much across the board – and the fascinating and inextricable relationship the two leads share – rife with tangible emotions – that gives the film that extra level of sensuality and sexuality." Andrew Mack of ScreenAnarchy called the film "matured and controlled" and opined that it "displays a departure from Cook's prior films and one that plays against the expectations that one may have about Burgess' screenplays." Mack wrote that it "drips and oozes with so much atmosphere that it could sustain a whole planet."

Jon Dickinson of Scream rated the film 2 stars out of 5 and wrote while Cook "has a great eye for detail which is perfectly complemented by Karl Janisse’s cinematography" and the film is "technically sound", he "didn’t find The Hexecutioners particularly scary" and stated that it "lacks its punches" Laura D. Girolamo of Exclaim! gave the film a score of 5/10 and stated that the film "squanders an excellent idea, and a great opportunity to tell a story about death and loss", and that "While ambiance is its strong suit, with a particular scene near the film's end a gorgeous blend of red, black and white, it's not creepy enough to sustain an entire 97 minutes." However, she praised the "complicated female leads with definitive emotions and unique personalities".
