= The Hoard =

2018 comedy horror film directed by Jesse Thomas Cook and Matt Wiele

- Film poster
- Directed by: Jesse Thomas Cook; Matt Wiele
- Written by: Jesse Thomas Cook; Matt Wiele; Tony Burgess
- Produced by: Jesse Thomas Cook; Matt Wiele; John Geddes
- Starring: Tony Burgess; Barry More; Ry Barrett; Elma Begovic
- Cinematography: Karl Janisse
- Edited by: Jesse Thomas Cook; Matt Wiele
- Music by: Adrian Ellis
- Production company: Foresight Features
- Release date: June 15, 2018 (Owen Sound)
- Running time: 99 minutes
- Country: Canada
- Language: English

The Hoard is a 2018 Canadian comedy horror film written, produced, edited, and directed by Jesse Thomas Cook and Matt Wiele. The movie was released in Owen Sound, Canada on June 15, 2018.

== Plot ==
The adventures and struggles of a production team trying to produce the pilot for a TV reality show called "Extremely Haunted Hoarders".

== Cast ==
- Lisa Solberg as Sheila Smyth
- Tony Burgess as Dr. Lance Ebe
- Barry More as Murph Evans
- Ry Barrett as Caleb Black
- Elma Begovic as Chloe Black

== Release ==
=== Reception ===
Anton Bitel from the British magazine SciFiNow called the movie "very, very funny", stating that "the screenplay from Burgess, Cook, and Wiele finding just the right place between smart and dumb, and turning garbage into pure gold". Kat Hughes writing for "The Hollywood News" argued that the film starts well, but finishes badly, saying: "The Hoard starts well, but ultimately gets lost in silliness. If you’re a fan of a certain brand of comedy then you’ll have the time of your life, otherwise you may find the whole affair rather unsavoury." Jennie Kermode from the website "Eye for Film" didn't like the film at all, giving it 2.5 stars out of 5 and writing: "The Hoard is, in many ways, a victim of its own success. It captures the in-your-face style of hoarding programmes perfectly but it's 96 minutes long with no advert breaks, and watching it quickly becomes exhausting."
