= Vicious Fun =

- Theatrical release poster
- Directed by: Cody Calahan
- Written by: James Villeneuve
- Produced by: Chad Archibald; Cody Calahan
- Starring: Evan Marsh; Amber Goldfarb; Ari Millen; Julian Richings; Robert Maillet; David Koechner
- Cinematography: Jeff Maher
- Music by: Steph Copeland
- Production companies: Breakthrough Entertainment; Black Fawn Films; Radioactive Pictures; Particular Crowd
- Distributed by: Shudder
- Release dates: October 8, 2020 (Sitges); November 4, 2021 (Germany)
- Running time: 101 minutes
- Country: Canada
- Language: English

Vicious Fun is a 2020 Canadian comedy horror film directed by Cody Calahan, written by James Villeneuve, and starring Evan Marsh, Ari Millen, Amber Goldfarb, Julian Richings, Robert Maillet and David Koechner.

== Plot ==
In 1983 Minnesota, serial killer Phil targets Carrie outside a motel. Carrie surprises Phil by suddenly stabbing him to death once he locks her inside his car. Joel, a film critic for the horror magazine Vicious Fanatics, interviews B-movie director Jack Portwood. Joel tells Jack his idea for a film about a serial-killing taxicab driver. At home, Joel sees his roommate Sarah, who he has an unrequited crush on, being dropped off by her new boyfriend Bob. Jealous of Bob and anxious for insight into Sarah, Joel follows Bob to a Chinese restaurant where they engage in conversation at the bar. Unaware of Joel’s true identity, Bob speaks disparagingly about Sarah’s pitiable roommate before leaving with another woman and sticking Joel with their tab.

Joel gets drunk, stumbles into a supply closet, and passes out. The restaurant locks up for the night. When he recovers, Joel wanders back into the dining room where Zachary is leading a meeting for Carrie, Fritz, Mike, and Hideo. The group mistakes Joel for Phil. Joel gradually realizes he is stuck in a self-help group for serial killers, so he plays along, using his movie pitch about a killer cab driver to blend in. He discovers Bob is also a serial killer when Bob arrives for the meeting late. Bob pokes holes in Joel’s killer cab driver claims, revealing that Joel isn’t Phil.

The killers argue over how to handle the interloper. When Zachary tries to assert authority, Mike, Hideo, and Fritz kill him. Carrie uses the opportunity to lock herself and Joel inside the kitchen. Carrie reveals she belongs to a secret organization and is on a mission to assassinate serial killers. Fritz tries getting inside the kitchen through an exterior door, but Carrie cuts off his fingers. Hideo sneaks into the kitchen through an overhead vent, but Carrie strangles him with Phil’s intestines. Bob finds Joel’s driver’s license and discovers he is Sarah’s roommate. Bob taunts Joel by threatening to kill Sarah. Joel tells Carrie about his crush and how he followed Bob to learn about his relationship with Sarah. Carrie suggests that Joel should reexamine his own stalker-like behavior. Without consulting Carrie, Joel pulls the fire alarm. Carrie warns Joel that the cops won’t save them. Bob calls 911 to frame Carrie as a dangerous threat. Bob, Mike, and Fritz then flee the scene. The police arrive, find the dead bodies, and arrest Carrie and Joel.

Officer Tony and detectives Doyle and Hollands take Carrie and Joel to the police station for questioning. Joel tries explaining what happened, but the detectives dismiss his seemingly crazy claims. Joel tries calling Sarah to warn her about Bob, but she simply says she is coming to get Joel before hanging up. Even though Carrie warns that Bob and the other killers will come to the station to murder everyone, the disbelieving detectives lock Carrie and Joel in a cell. Bob poses as a special agent to infiltrate the police station. Bob’s ruse gives him access to a notebook confiscated from Carrie. Carrie’s kill list reveals what she has been doing. Fritz kills Officer Tony. Mike and Bob kill the two detectives. Using a paper clip, Carrie unlocks both her cell and Joel's, then kills Mike and orders Joel to leave the station.

Sarah arrives at the station just before Joel returns. Carrie kills Fritz, but Bob stabs her from behind, then stabs Joel in his arm when he tries to shield Carrie. Bob strangles her but Joel knocks him to the floor and helps Carrie limp outside to Sarah’s car. Sarah smacks into Bob while speeding away to the hospital. Bob poses as a doctor to infiltrate the hospital where Carrie and Joel are being treated. Joel helps Carrie fight Bob. Carrie stabs Bob to death with a scalpel. Having changed her mind about Joel’s usefulness, Carrie considers taking him on as an apprentice. Joel nods goodbye to Sarah as he and Carrie sneak out of the hospital. Some time later, Carrie and Joel take down a serial killer hiding out at a movie theater showing a Jack Portwood film based on the killer cab driver idea Jack stole from Joel.

== Cast ==
- Evan Marsh as Joel
- Amber Goldfarb as Carrie
- Ari Millen as Bob
- Julian Richings as Fritz
- Sean Baek as Hideo
- Robert Maillet as Mike
- David Koechner as Zachary
- Alexa Rose Steele as Sarah
- Kristopher Bowman as Detective Doyle
- Mark Gibson as Detective Hollands
- John Fray as Officer Tony
- Joe Bostick as Phil
- Gord Rand as Jack Portwood

== Reception ==
On review aggregator website Rotten Tomatoes, the film has an approval rating of 88% based on 49 reviews, with an average rating of 7.0/10. The website's consensus reads, "A fiendishly goofy premise, strong performances, and a strong dose of winkingly meta humor help Vicious Fun deliver on its title." Metacritic, which uses a weighted average, assigned the film a score of 51 out of 100, based on 4 critics, indicating "mixed or average" reviews.

Natalia Keogan of Paste gave the film a 7.4 rating, saying, "Vicious Fun will delight any horror fan with a cursory knowledge of the genre." The Guardian's Leslie Felperin gave the film 3/5 stars. However, Simon Abrams of RogerEbert.com gave the film 1 star and called the film "corny" and criticized its "latent sexism."
