= Chuck Baker (musician) =

Canadian singer

Chuck Baker is a Canadian folk-rock singer and guitarist from Stayner, Ontario, who has been a member of the rock band Left by Snakes alongside vocalist Tony Burgess. They received a Canadian Screen Award nomination for Best Original Song at the 11th Canadian Screen Awards in 2023 for "The Ascension Song", written for the film Cult Hero.

He has released the solo albums A Little Piece of Quiet (2006), Every Flat Earth (2012) and In a Room (2012).

Chuck Baker is also the guitarist and backup vocalist in the rock band, Lucy Jinx, whose music can be described as glam rot, crunched epics, and scratched anthems in a hot pop maze. "Lucy Jinx is a wicked high energy glam pop project featuring hundreds of hook based automatic songs. Lucy writes her songs automatically, and this is key to understanding their peculiar sound: each recording represents the moment the song was 'written'. Recordings are brought to the band, learned and released. The sound is lo-fi glam pop infused with sharp hooks."
