= Bite (film) =

- Theatrical film poster
- Directed by: Chad Archibald
- Written by: Chad Archibald; Jayme Laforest
- Produced by: Chad Archibald; Cody Calahan; Christopher Giroux
- Starring: Elma Begovic; Annette Wozniak; Denise Yuen; Jordan Gray; Lawrene Denkers; Barry Birnberg; Daniel Klimitz; Tianna Nori; Caroline Palmer
- Cinematography: Jeff Maher
- Edited by: Nick Montgomery
- Music by: Steph Copeland
- Production companies: Black Fawn Films; Breakthrough Entertainment
- Distributed by: Black Fawn Distribution; United Front Entertainment
- Release date: 29 July 2015 (Fantasia Film Festival)
- Running time: 88 minutes
- Country: Canada
- Language: English

Bite is a 2015 Canadian body horror film written and directed by Chad Archibald, and starring Elma Begovic, Annette Wozniak, Denise Yuen, Jordan Gray, Lawrene Denkers, Barry Birnberg, Daniel Klimitz, Tianna Nori, and Caroline Palmer. It was produced by Black Fawn Films, MGM Productions and Scream Factory, and Breakthrough Entertainment. The plot is about a young woman who is bitten by a waterborne insect whilst in Costa Rica and suffers horrifying and transformative consequences.

== Plot ==
Casey (Elma Begovic) celebrates her bachelorette party with her friends Kirsten and Jill in Costa Rica. She is second-guessing her impending wedding to her fiancé Jared Kennedy and is exasperated with Jared's mother, who happens to be Casey’s landlord. Casey gets bitten by an insect at one point during the trip but is too preoccupied to take notice, brushing it off as an ordinary bug bite. After returning home, her body begins to mutate gradually, her senses become abnormally acute, she can no longer tolerate the taste of food, and she is plagued by nightmares. When she wakes up one day, she finds there are insect eggs all over her apartment. Jared's mother invades Casey's apartment to angrily challenge her about her plans to marry her son, but Casey kills her when she instinctively spits acid into her face during an argument. Noticing she hasn't seen Casey for days, Kirsten becomes very worried and visits her, but Casey ends up killing her as well when she finds the body of Mrs. Kennedy and panics.

It is revealed that Jill is in love with Jared and deeply resents Casey for being engaged to him. In reality, she has been attempting to sabotage their relationship since Costa Rica, where she stole Casey’s engagement ring and got her drunk so she'd sleep with other men at the party (which Jill recorded to make it look like Casey cheated on him). Jill shows Jared the footage and seduces him. Thanks to her heightened senses, Casey hears the two as they have sex in Jill's car and becomes enraged. Later, when Jill enters Casey's apartment, she is overpowered and tied to a chair. When she wakes up, a heavily transformed Casey forces her to watch more of the footage, revealing that she had recorded one of the men taking Casey to his room to rape her after she'd become too drunk to fight back. After confronting Jill about her betrayal, Casey forces her to call for Jared, who then rushes into the apartment. Casey kills Jill in front of him, and the two begin to fight. Although Jared is able to impale Casey, he is gravely injured when she uses her newly-grown tail to sting him. He drags himself back to his apartment and tries to make an emergency call, but fails.

A week later, the entire building has been quarantined. The police raid the house and find the bodies of Mrs. Kennedy, Jill, and Kirsten in Casey's apartment. They also find Jared in his own apartment, seriously injured and already mutated into some kind of human cocoon. When they try to help him, a massive swarm of insects hatch from the eggs in his body and attack the police. At the end of the film, two joggers are talking about an upcoming trip to Costa Rica. One of them is bitten by one of the newly-hatched insects, but she dismisses it as "just a bite".

== Cast ==
- Elma Begovic as Casey
- Annette Wozniak as Jill
- Denise Yuen as Kirsten
- Jordan Gray as Jared
- Lawrence Denkers as Mrs. Kennedy
- Barry Birnberg as Mr. Mathenson
- Daniel Klimitz as Mao
- Tianna Nori as Joanne
- Caroline Palmer as Hannah

== Release ==
Bite was released in 2015 at the Fantasia International Film Festival, Fantasy Filmfest, Film4 Fright Fest, Mile High Horror Film Festival, Sitges Film Festival, Lund International Fantastic Film Festival, Chicago International Film Festival, Tucson Terrorfest, Night Visions Film Festival, Another Hole in the Head Film Festival, Monster Fest, Blood in the Snow Canadian Film Festival, and Texas Frightmare Weekend. A subtitled version was released in Madrid, Spain on June 7, 2016.

== Reception ==
The film received mixed to negative reviews from critics. Review aggregator website Rotten Tomatoes reports an approval rating of 50% based on 18 reviews, with an average rating of 5.81/10. Metacritic reports an aggregated score of 57 based on 4 critics, indicating "mixed or average reviews".

The beginning of the film and character development in particular were criticized, with the relationships and acting being described as unconvincing and generic to the point of being parodic, while the complex themes and body-horror elements were generally viewed more favorably by critics, Brian Tallerico from RogerEbert.com called it "one of those early career horror entries in which the filmmakers don't quite nail the set-up or the landing, but the gooey center of the film works for those with a high tolerance for things that might make a majority of the population queasy."

Phil Wheat from Nerdly had a slightly more positive takeaway after seeing the Frightfest 2015 screening: "Bite is a strange and claustrophobic tale of sexuality, horror, and bodily fluids that recalls the best of David Cronenberg (Rabid, Shivers, The Fly), even echoing of Roman Polanski's Repulsion in the isolated madness of Casey's condition. And as such is unmissable" and Matt Boiselle from Dread Central stated that "Bite definitely has the chops to be the Fly of the new age and simply shouldn't be missed, especially if you're a gorehound on the prowl."

Many audience members were apparently unprepared for the gruesome content of the film however, as Fantasia Film Festival co-director Mitch Davis said on Facebook, "I leave the BITE premiere for all of ten minutes and the following text lights up my phone: "2 people fainted. One girl is puking and another hit his head on the stairs". Truth." Davis also had special Bite branded barf bags handed out to the audience.
