= Gerontophilia (film) =

- Theatrical release cover
- Directed by: Bruce LaBruce
- Screenplay by: Bruce LaBruce; Daniel Allen Cox
- Story by: Bruce LaBruce
- Produced by: Nicolas Comeau; Leonard Farlinger; Jennifer Jonas
- Starring: Pier-Gabriel Lajoie; Walter Borden; Katie Boland; Marie-Hélène Thibault
- Cinematography: Nicolas Canniccioni
- Edited by: Glenn Berman
- Music by: Ramachandra Borcar
- Production companies: 1976 Productions; New Real Films
- Distributed by: Filmoption International
- Release dates: August 28, 2013 (Venice Film Festival); July 4, 2014 (Canada)
- Running time: 82 minutes
- Country: Canada
- Languages: English; French
- Budget: $2 million
- Box office: $80,000

Gerontophilia is a 2013 Canadian romantic comedy-drama film directed by Bruce LaBruce and written by LaBruce and Daniel Allen Cox. The film had its world premiere in the Venice Days section at the 70th Venice International Film Festival on August 28, 2013, and was screened in the Vanguard section at the 2013 Toronto International Film Festival.

Described as a gay Harold and Maude, the film follows Lake, a young man who takes a job in a nursing home and develops a romantic and sexual attraction to Mr. Peabody, an elderly resident in the facility. Unlike most of LaBruce's earlier films, Gerontophilia is not sexually explicit; instead, LaBruce chose to adapt his traditional themes of sexual taboo into a film more palatable to a mainstream audience.

== Synopsis ==
Lake is an 18-year-old closeted homosexual college student who discovers that he has a romantic attraction to elderly men even though he is already in a relationship with his girlfriend Désirée. One day, he applies for a nursing job at a retirement home, where he meets a resident named Mr. Peabody, and the two of them become close friends. After a while, the two men develop a romantic and sexual relationship. After noticing that the residents are being overdosed on their medication by the employees, Lake decides to take Peabody off his daily medication and help him escape to a better place. This results in the two of them taking a cross-country road trip together that deepens their bond.

== Cast ==
- Walter Borden as Mr. Peabody
- Pier-Gabriel Lajoie as Lake
- Marie-Hélène Thibault as Marie
- Katie Boland as Désirée
- Yardly Kavanagh as Nurse Baptiste
- Shawn Campbell as Bradley Nelson
- Jean-Alexandre Létourneau as Kevin
- Dana Wright as Dina
- Brian D. Wright as Mr. Guerrero

== Production ==
Bruce LaBruce intended to give Gerontophilia a 1970s atmosphere by shooting the film with an ARRI Alexa whilst using some Zeiss prime lenses from the era.

The film received funding from both Telefilm Canada and SODEC, as well as a crowdfunding campaign on Indiegogo.

== Reception ==
On the review aggregator website Rotten Tomatoes, 50% of 28 critics' reviews are positive. The website's consensus reads: "Gerontophilia's handful of intriguing ideas are let down by tame execution and unconvincing acting that make the movie's premise feel creepy rather than original." Metacritic, which uses a weighted average, assigned the film a score of 48 out of 100, based on 9 critics, indicating "mixed or average" reviews.

Dave Croyle of Gay Essential called the film a "captivating story of love, loss, and personal exploration."

Rakesh Ramchurn of The Independent commented, "It is rare that I would salute a predominantly underground director's move towards mainstream filmmaking, but by toning down the sex and nudity of his previous works, LaBruce has made a film that I hope will be enjoyed by wide audiences in the months to come."

== See also ==
- List of LGBT-related films of 2013
