= Pontypool, Ontario =

Coordinates: 44°06′02.6″N 78°37′40.5″W

- Unincorporated village
- Interactive map of Pontypool, Ontario
- Country: Canada
- Province: Ontario
- County (historical): Victoria
- Founder: James Leigh; John Jennings
- Area code(s): 705 & 249
- Highways: Highway 35; Highway 115

Pontypool is an unincorporated village within the southernmost part of the amalgamated city of Kawartha Lakes, Ontario.

Prior to amalgamation, Pontypool was an unincorporated village within the township of Manvers, in the county of Victoria.

It has a grocery store, convenience store, LCBO, Chinese restaurant, gas station (destroyed by fire in April 2008, and since rebuilt), pharmacy, community centre, church and post office and a siding on the Canadian Pacific Railway. The town used to be an old Jewish vacation spot with a big camp ground by the big pond on the outskirts of town. There is also a baseball field and a public park.

Its post office services locals with lock boxes and 3 rural routes.

== History ==
Pontypool, as the youngest settlement in the township, was the last to develop, although people were farming in the area since before the first census of 1835. Settlers James Leigh and John Jennings are credited with starting the community and naming it after a town in their homeland, Pontypool, Wales. Lore has it that the fact that there were five distinct pools fed by nearby streams in the immediate vicinity of the settlement may have influenced their decision in naming the village. Although it is unknown exactly what year sawing operations began it is known that by 1865 one mill was in operation, James Leigh (moved into the area in 1853) being the sawyer, and also working the mill was James Jennings.

In about 1872, Simon Jennings, son of James Jennings, opened a general store and took over the sawmill. It was in this store that a Post Office was installed in 1881, with Simon Jennings as the village's first Postmaster. At this time the small settlement was still being called Jennings' Mills, even though the official postal name Pontypool had been adopted.

Pontypool began its real climb into village status when the Canadian Pacific Railway laid a railway line west to east across the township, linking with Burketon Station in the west to Peterborough in the east. The line was constructed in the 1880s and provided a direct line to Toronto for local produce, cattle, and grain. In fact, grain was such an important part of life to the inhabitants that an elevator still stands today as a landmark to the importance of this commodity. The line allowed easy day-trips from the Toronto area. Today, the line is known as the Havelock Subdivision and still sees a small amount of traffic.

By 1892 the population of Pontypool had risen to 600 people. By 1917 the economy of the town consisted of: a hotel, two agricultural implements shops, three general merchants, a livery stable, shoe maker, blacksmith, hardware store, bakery, grocery/butcher, Pontypool Telephone, Light and Power Co-operative. The Pontypool Grain Elevator, built in 1918, is only one of two of its kind in existence in Ontario at present and is in the best state of preservation.

In 2009, Bruce McDonald directed a horror film entitled Pontypool set in the town, based on the 1995 Tony Burgess novel Pontypool Changes Everything.

Also in 2009, the 4th Line Theatre, directed by Kim Blackwell, performed The Right Road to Pontypool, a historical play by Alex Poch-Goldin. The 4th Line Theatre's synopsis of the play reads "The little known true story of how a small village in Ontario became a summer haven for thousands of Jewish immigrants between 1916 and the early 1960s. In the era when the signs at Sunnyside Beach in Toronto said "No Dogs or Jews Allowed" the village of Pontypool Ontario became a retreat for thousands of Jewish immigrants who worked in Toronto's garment district."
