= Molly Dunsworth =

Canadian actress

- Born: Molly Kathleen Dunsworth; May 25, 1990 (age 35); Halifax, Nova Scotia, Canada
- Occupation: Actress
- Years active: 2000–present
- Website: Website

Molly Kathleen Dunsworth (born May 25, 1990) is a Canadian actress. She is best known for her starring role in the Canadian feature film Hobo with a Shotgun, in which she plays "Abby" alongside Rutger Hauer.

== Early life ==
Dunsworth grew up in Halifax, Nova Scotia, and is the youngest daughter of actor John Dunsworth and the sister of actress Sarah E. Dunsworth, both known for their involvement in the Trailer Park Boys franchise.

== Hobo with a Shotgun ==
Hobo with a Shotgun was the first feature film Dunsworth had a starring role in. Dunsworth co-stars in the film, alongside Rutger Hauer, in the role of Abby, a "hooker with a heart of gold". The film premiered at Sundance Film Festival on January 21, 2011, in the Park City at Midnight category and was released in theatres across Canada on March 25, 2011.

== Filmography ==
Year	Film	Role	Notes
2000	Deeply	Silly (Age 6)	
2008	The Memory Keeper's Daughter	Young Woman – 18 years	(TV movie)
2008	The Tenth Circle	Passing Girl #1	(TV movie)
2008	Treevenge	Molly Carpenter	Short film
2010, 2013–2015	Haven	Vickie Dutton	9 episodes
2011	Hobo with a Shotgun	Abby	
2011	Jesse Stone: Innocents Lost	Emily	
2012	Mr. D	Rebecca Lewis	Episode: Job Opportunity
2012	Room Service	The Girl	Short film
2012	Everyone's Famous	Molly	Web series
2013	Septic Man	Shelley	
2013	Bunker 6	Alice	
2013	Relative Happiness	Gabby Ivy	
2014	Trailer Park Boys: Don't Legalize It	Girl	
2022	From	Jasmine	

== See also ==
- List of former child actors from Canada
