= Bunker 6 =

- Film poster
- Directed by: Greg Jackson
- Written by: Greg Jackson
- Produced by: Rebecca Sharratt
- Starring: Andrea Lee Norwood; Molly Dunsworth; Jim Fowler; Glen Matthews; Shelley Thompson
- Cinematography: Christopher Ball
- Edited by: Sarah Byrne
- Music by: David Chisholm
- Production company: Sheltered Pictures
- Distributed by: Multiple Media Entertainment
- Release date: September 14, 2013
- Running time: 78 minutes
- Country: Canada
- Language: English
- Budget: $100,000

Bunker 6 is a 2013 Canadian psychological thriller film set in an alternate timeline in which a nuclear holocaust takes place during the Cuban Missile Crisis. Most of the film's action is set a decade later, inside a very large fallout shelter, in which a group of survivors are faced with the dilemma of continuing life in the shelter or facing the uncertainty of life in a world contaminated by radiation. Theatrically released, the film was also destined for television and "direct-to-video" release. Directed by Canadian writer and director Greg Jackson, in his first feature film, it stars Andrea Lee Norwood and Molly Dunsworth. The supporting cast includes Jim Fowler, Glen Matthews and Shelley Thompson. The film was shot in an actual fallout shelter in Nova Scotia.

== Plot ==
On October 30, 1962, young Grace (Sophie Elliott) knows her father (Glenn Lefchak), who is a high-ranking military officer, is afraid that the United States and the Soviet Union are about to unleash nuclear attacks on each other's homeland. He takes her and her mother (Geneviève Steele) to a fallout shelter. A tragic accident, however, separates the girl from her parents, and she is trapped in Bunker #6 where Lewis (Daniel Lillford), a kind technician at the shelter, looks after her.

Ten years later, the nuclear fallout shelter Bunker #6 is still the home for Grace (Andrea Lee Norwood). When Lewis, her mentor and father figure, dies, she is left to take charge of a small group of survivors in a deteriorating underground shelter. The group is unaware of any other survivors of the nuclear holocaust that has enveloped the Earth.

Grace's daily task is to monitor the communications room and try to establish contact with others who have survived the war. One day, she hears a scratchy message from Bunker #8, but her efforts to tell the others about the discovery is met with dismayed reactions as the radio sets remain dead.

Alice (Molly Dunsworth), Grace's arch rival for control of the bunker, is upset and demands that the radio monitoring be stopped. Grace receives motherly advice from Mary (Shelley Thompson) but events begin to take a strange turn with Eric (Jim Fowler) and Joe (Glen Matthews) at odds over Eric's attempts to leave the shelter.

Grace seemingly sees her friends murdered as she starts to hallucinate. Her thoughts of what lies in the outside world beyond the heavy blast doors of the bunker leads her to make a decision that may prove to be fatal.

== Cast ==
- Andrea Lee Norwood as Grace
- Molly Dunsworth as Alice
- Jim Fowler as Eric
- Glen Matthews as Joe
- Shelley Thompson as Mary
- Daniel Lillford as Lewis
- Sophie Elliott as Young Grace
- Glenn Lefchak as Grace's Father
- Geneviève Steele as Grace's Mother

== Production ==
The film was shot in February 2013 over a three-week shooting schedule on location in Debert, Nova Scotia, inside a two-level nuclear shelter, or "Diefenbunker". The opening sequence was shot in the Cambridge Military Library in Halifax. Not only the setting but all the cast and crew were from Nova Scotia.

The fallout shelter was constructed in the 1960s and built to house 350 people, but the cast and crew found that working underground in the massive centre for the length of the production was not only claustrophobic but also extremely tiring. The days began in darkness, the shooting took the rest of the day and when filming was finished, the cast and crew again left in darkness. The fallout shelter was also cold, adding to the discomfort in working long hours.

== Reception ==
Despite its modest budget and limited use of special effects, many critics found Bunker 6 a refreshing departure from the cookie-cutter school of horror and science fiction films. Film critic Jonathan Anderson in Starburst magazine wrote "... this low-budget sci-fi thriller is a slow burner which keeps you watching and wondering what will happen next. It's enjoyable and tense, and the claustrophobic setting works well."

Other reviews focused on the main focus of the film, trying to keep interest in a "confinement thriller" offshoot of the horror genre. Jay Seaver inEFilmCritic.com commented: "... And while I don't particularly like describing a film's location as being like a character, there is no doubt that 'Bunker 6' benefits immensely from being able to shoot in an actual Cold War bunker in Nova Scotia meant to shelter the government in case of nuclear attack. Beyond simple authenticity, the feeling is just right, too big in some places but too cramped in others, with just the right amount of decay (in some ways, this sort of sealed-off environment has to be somewhat pristine even as it's breaking down). Jackson and cinematographer Christopher Ball shoot impressively even when the location forces them into odd angles, and get a big boost from some downright fantastic sound work."

=== Awards ===
Bunker 6 won the First Feature Project from Film and Creative Industries Nova Scotia and Telefilm Canada at the Atlantic Film Festival in Halifax in September 2012. Bunker 6 also won the Festival Prize as the Best Film in the 2013 Hamilton Film Festival, California, while David Chisholm won the Atlantic Canadian Award for Best Atlantic Original Score or Song for Bunker 6 at the Atlantic Film Festival 2013.
