= Nicole G. Leier =

Canadian actress

- Occupation: Actress
- Years active: 1999–present
- Website: http://www.nicoleleier.com/

Nicole G. Leier is an actress, director, and producer who resides in Los Angeles, California, United States. She gained recognition for her role in the teen drama series Edgemont and later starred in Black Chicks, a short film written and directed by Neil LaBute, for which she also served as an executive producer. She has become increasingly known for her work as a director, helming projects such as Henry's Glasses and the feature film Trapped in the Spotlight (2025).

She produces and directs films through her production company, Black Tree Pictures, which she co-founded with cinematographer Brendan Uegama.

== Filmography ==
Film
Year	Title	Role	Notes
2007	Our Planet, Our Faces		Documentary short film; co-producer
2010	Henry's Glasses		Short film; producer
2011	Hip Hop Mum		Short film; associate producer
2012	The Company You Keep	Gas Station Customer	
2013	Septic Man	Girl	
2014	The Interview	Skylark Employee	
2016	Toni Braxton: Unbreak My Heart	Grammy Reporter	
2016	The Perfect Pickup	Fighter Girl	Producer
2016	Black Chicks	Girl (lead role)	Short film; executive producer
2019	A Score to Settle	Sleepy's daughter	
2023	Sworn Justice: Taken Before Christmas		Director
2025	Trapped in the Spotlight		Director; executive producer

Television
Year	Title	Role	Notes
2000	2gether	2gether fan	TV movie
2000	Dark Angel	Phone Girl I	Episode: 411 on the DL
2001-2003	Edgemont	Kelsey Laidlaw	Recurring role: 14 episodes
2004	Tru Calling	Classmate	Episode: Reunion
2011	True Justice	Woman	Episode: Real Justice Part 1
2013	Rogue	Upscale Waitress	Episode: The Second Amendment
2014	Eaux troubles du crime	Bibi Khan	Episode: The Sureta Khan Affair: The Ladykiller
2015	The Bridge	Shauna	TV movie
