= The Hyperborean =

2023 Canadian comedy horror film

- Directed by: Jesse Thomas Cook
- Written by: Tony Burgess
- Produced by: Jesse Thomas Cook; Samuel Scott
- Starring: Liv Collins; Tony Burgess; Jessica Vano; Ry Barrett
- Cinematography: Kenny MacLaughlin
- Edited by: Mike Gallant
- Music by: Adrian Ellis
- Production company: Collingwood Film Co.
- Release date: October 20, 2023 (Forest City)
- Running time: 94 minutes
- Country: Canada
- Language: English

The Hyperborean is a Canadian comedy horror science fiction film, directed by Jesse Thomas Cook and released in 2023.

== Plot ==
The film centres on the wealthy owner of a whisky distillery company who summons his family to help recover a case of whisky that the company lost over 100 years ago when the ship foundered in the Canadian Arctic, but unwittingly unleash an ice mummy because a dead sailor's body was preserved in one of the whisky barrels.

== Cast ==
The cast includes Liv Collins, Tony Burgess, Jessica Vano, Ry Barrett, Jonathan Craig, Marcia Alderson, Justin Bott, Greg Collins, Justin Darmanin and Steve Kasan.

== Background ==
It was the fourth feature film produced by the Collingwood Film Company, an independent production studio established in 2018 by Cook and Collins.

== Release ==
It premiered in October 2023 at the Forest City Film Festival, where Cook and co-producer Samuel Scott also won the Pitch This competition for their future screenplay Turn It Up.

== Accolades ==
Katie Ballantyne, Jonathan Craig, and Karlee Morse received a Canadian Screen Award nomination for Best Makeup at the 12th Canadian Screen Awards in 2024.
