= The Heretics (2017 film) =

- Promotional poster
- Directed by: Chad Archibald
- Written by: Chad Archibald; Jayme Laforest
- Produced by: Chad Archibald; Cody Calahan; Christopher Giroux
- Starring: Nina Kiri; Ry Barrett; Jorja Cadence; Will King; Nina Richmond; Austin Duffy
- Cinematography: Jeff Maher
- Edited by: Nick Montgomery
- Music by: Steph Copeland
- Production companies: Black Fawn Films; Breakthrough Entertainment
- Distributed by: Black Fawn Distribution; United Front Entertainment
- Release dates: 22 March 2017 (Canadian Film Fest); 1 November 2017
- Running time: 87 minutes
- Country: Canada
- Language: English

The Heretics is a 2017 Canadian body horror film directed by Chad Archibald and produced by Black Fawn Films and Breakthrough Entertainment. It is about a young woman who is kidnapped and transforms into a demon. It stars Nina Kiri, Ry Barrett, Jorja Cadence, Will King, Nina Richmond and Austin Duffy.

The film was released on March 22, 2017, at the Canadian Film Fest, and later on November 1, 2017, in Canada. It received positive reviews from the critics, who praised the performances, special effects, and tone, but it received some mixed reviews for the screenplay.

== Plot ==
Gloria is kidnapped by a cult that, under a locust moon, (Note: A locust moon is the appearance of a full moon in late spring after the "flower moon" of May.) performs an occult ritual while wearing grotesque masks before committing suicide. Five years later, a traumatized Gloria is living with her mother, Ruth. Slowly recovering from her experience, Gloria attends a therapy group at her local church with her lover Joan. Joan tells Gloria she has something special planned for their anniversary the next day. However, Gloria is kidnapped by Thomas, a man whose face is hideously scarred by fire, and taken to a remote cabin in the countryside.

Joan launches an increasingly frenetic search for Gloria and pulls a knife on a man who is indifferent to Gloria's kidnapping. When a police officer learns of Joan's violent behaviour, he suspects that she was involved in Gloria's kidnapping, which leads her to kill both him and the inconvenient witness Ruth. Thomas tells Gloria that he was one of the cultists who had kidnapped her five years ago and that he was moved by her humanity, which caused him to abandon his beliefs on that night. He feigned suicide and stated that he kidnapped her to protect her from the remaining cultists, who intend to finish the ritual under the coming locust moon. The cultists believed that they had implanted the demon Abaddon, the "Taker of Souls", into Gloria's body and that it has been growing inside of her for the last five years.

Under the light of the locust moon, Gloria becomes seriously ill and begs Thomas to take her to a hospital. Both Thomas and Gloria experience visions of Abaddon while various occurrences suggest a malevolent supernatural force is present in the cabin. As Gloria begins to grow wings, Thomas starts to believe she really is turning into Abaddon and contemplates killing her before the transformation is complete. Joan is revealed to be the leader of the cult who kidnapped Gloria. Thomas tells Gloria that Joan is actually his sadistic sister Gwendolyn, who scarred him with fire. Gloria, whose appearance becomes increasingly inhuman as the metamorphosis progresses, starts to lose herself mentally and speaks in the voice of Abaddon, saying that she will kill Thomas first and take his soul to hell.

Gwendolyn learns from a witness that Gloria's kidnapper had a scarred face, which leads her to deduce that it was Thomas. Gwendolyn goes to the cabin (which belonged to their parents), knocks out Thomas, taunts a chained Gloria over her physical degeneration, and begins to perform an occult ritual. Thomas breaks free, kills Gwendolyn, and takes a seemingly dead Gloria outside under a rising sun. Gloria revives and attacks him, saying in the voice of Abaddon that she will take his soul to hell.

== Cast ==
- Nina Kiri – Gloria
- Ry Barrett – Thomas
- Jorja Cadence – Gwendolyn
- Will King – Kent
- Nina Richmond – Ruth
- Austin Duffy – Abaddon

== Production ==
The film was financed by Breakthrough Entertainment as the last in a two-year eight-picture deal with Black Fawn Films, signed in June 2014, at about $500,000 each. Chad Archibald directed the film, which was written by Jayme LaForest.

The film was shot in Toronto, Erin and Guelph, Ontario.

== Distribution and release ==
The Heretics premiered at the 11th edition of the Canadian Film Festival in Toronto, on 22 March 2017. Jason Anderson of the Toronto Star called it "a standout" among the new features. The eight-picture deal with Breakthrough had solidified Black Fawn's reputation, and their films were universally welcomed at horror film festivals. The Heretics was also screened at the 2017 Berlin International Film Festival.

Toronto-based distributor A71 obtained the Canadian rights to the film, which was released on 1 November 2017 as a special event screening at 15 Landmark Cinemas theaters across the country, followed by a week-long national release beginning 3 November. Breakthrough Entertainment distributed the film internationally. A71 partnered with Black Fawn to release the film on DVD and Blu-ray in early 2018.

== Reception ==
On the review aggregator website Rotten Tomatoes, 83% of 6 critics' reviews are positive. However, the film received 25% approval from the audience.

In a review, critic Ricky Church praised the acting and felt that the direction and special effects made the best use of the film's modest budget. The website CultureCrypt in a review stated: "Overall, The Heretics is a satisfying, if ultimately adequate, horror movie featuring cults, crazies, and a cabin in the woods. Even though it isn't a standout in Black Fawn and Chad Archibald's complete catalog, it isn't a weak film on its own merit". Critic Andrew Mack called The Heretics Archibald's "...best work to date." With a familiar narrative, he still manages a couple of surprises to keep it interesting. His cast contains a reliable stalwart and lets us know that there are a couple of femme fatales emerging on the horizon." In a review, critic Josh Hancock called The Heretics a "stylish, well-made horror film" that told a "captivating story" with good performances from the cast.

In a review on Horror Fuel website, the critic Dan XIII praised Kiri's performance, writing: "Kiri makes for a great lead who can go from vulnerable victim, to strong survivor, to off-kilter possessed with equal skill and aplomb, and make no mistake...this film is her showcase." Critic Luke Rodriguez felt that the film would have benefited from additional takes of key scenes to provide more even performances. Nevertheless, he declared that: "The Heretics is a modern marvel of independent genre cinema. When you consider the confines that Chad Archibald and team had to work within to make this happen, and the final product that they delivered, it's hard to fathom how the hell it's even possible."

A review on the website Let the Movies Move Us stated: "The Heretics justifies the genre of horror, as some scenes, musical score and even the make-up do their job perfectly. The plot itself was a bit flat and uninspiring, which unfortunately was visible to the naked eye. The actors, however, do a decent job despite the screenplay, again, that was not that richly written. However, in spite of bumpy moments, The Heretics [...] is not a bad movie at all. And I am sure with good publicity it might reach a wider audience, who will appreciate it more than I did. It just happened that I was not the right one..." A review on the website Anatomy Of A Scream stated: "Where The Heretics lacks in character development, it makes up for in motivation. We never fully understand why Gloria has been chosen as the cult's vessel, but that's exactly what she is: a shiny vessel to deliver what they were promised. And that transformation is pretty impressive. The slimy black gunk of hell oozing out of Gloria is unsettling and disturbing while the mental gymnastics of what's really happening to her leaves you disoriented and creeped out."

In the Winnipeg Free Press, critic Randall King compared the film to the bigger-budget, Ontario-shot horror. The Void, writing that The Heretics is "comparatively stripped of cast and outré visual effects, aiming instead for dramatic potency to push its concept over the top."

=== Awards ===
Kiri was awarded the Best Actress prize at the Buffalo Dreams Fantastic Film Festival for her performance in The Heretics.
