= State of Syn =

State of Syn is a motion comic webseries created by Smokebomb Entertainment, starring Jewel Staite and David Hewlett. The series aired on Hulu in 2013, with multiple episodes previewed on YouTube.

The series is supported by two mobile apps: State of Syn: The Outside World, a puzzle game with a story threaded through it, and State of Syn: Singularity, an app for Google Glass.

State of Syn won an IAWTV award in January 2014 for Best Interactive Experience. It was also nominated for a 2014 Rocky Award for Best Cross-Platform, Fiction.

== Synopsis ==
The show follows Annika Drake (Staite) and her friends who, following the unexplained death of her father, are pulled into a twisted mystery surrounding his former company, emerging tech giant Psylo5ense. Now run by her father's former business partner Aslin Kane (Hewlett), Psylo5ense is manufacturing a highly addictive new sensory experience called Vibe—a digital technology simulating a neurological condition called synesthesia—which is poised to become the new opiate of the masses. Annika digs deeper to uncover the truth but finds herself learning some very disturbing secrets.
