= Stephen McHattie =

Canadian actor (born 1946)

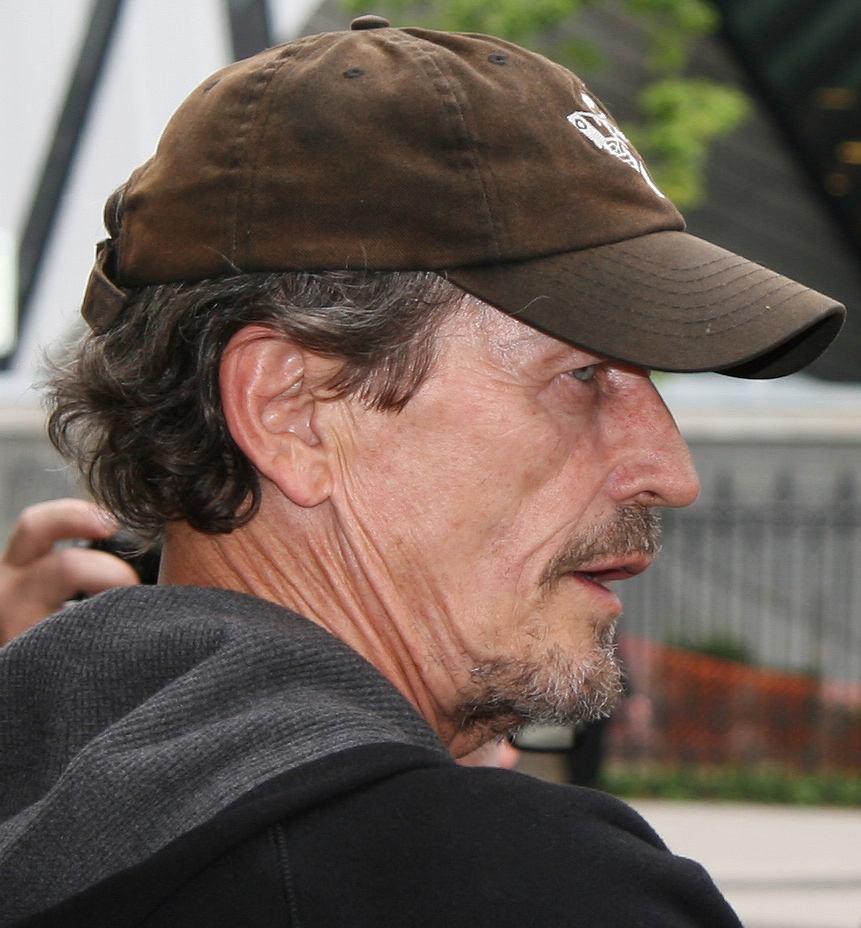
- McHattie at the 2008 Toronto International Film Festival
- Born: Stephen McHattie Smith; February 3, 1947 (age 79); Antigonish, Nova Scotia, Canada
- Education: American Academy of Dramatic Arts
- Occupation: Actor
- Years active: 1970–present
- Spouses: Meg Foster (divorced); Lisa Houle (m. 19??)
- Children: 3

Stephen McHattie Smith (born February 3, 1947) is a Canadian actor. Since beginning his professional career in 1970, he has amassed over 200 film, television, and theatre credits; and has collaborated with directors like Darren Aronofsky, Bruce McDonald, and David Cronenberg. He played Jimmy Murray on the CBC drama Emily of New Moon (1998-2000) and Sgt. Frank Coscarella on the police procedural Cold Squad (1999-2001).

He won the Genie Award for Best Supporting Actor for his performance as Dick Irvin in The Rocket, and was nominated for Best Actor for Pontypool. He was nominated for a Drama Desk Award for Yehoshua Sobol's Ghetto and won an Obie Award for Mensch Meier.

== Early life ==
McHattie was born in Antigonish, Nova Scotia, on February 3, 1947 (the year of his birth has also been cited as 1945, 1946, and 1948), and raised in Guysborough County. At 16, he began acting in local amateur plays and at 19 moved to New York City, where he studied at the American Academy of Dramatic Arts.

== Career ==
McHattie began his career on stage in the 1968 Broadway production of The American Dream. Two years later he made his film debut in The People Next Door. He appeared in other Broadway plays, including Mourning Becomes Electra in 1972, The Iceman Cometh in 1973, and Ghetto in 1989, for which he was nominated for a Drama Desk Award for Outstanding Actor in a Play.

McHattie has appeared in many films and television shows including Star Trek: Deep Space Nine, Star Trek: Enterprise, Highlander: The Series, and American Playhouse's Life Under Water (1989). His roles include 300, A History of Violence, The Fountain, Secretary, Shoot 'Em Up, Life with Billy, One Dead Indian, Beverly Hills Cop III. In Canada, he appeared in Canada: A People's History as Canadian hero Major-General Sir Isaac Brock, and in The Rocket as coach Dick Irvin.

He portrayed an extraordinary USMC sniper (based on real life sniper Carlos Hathcock) in the JAG season one episode "High Ground". In 1976, he played iconic American actor James Dean in the television movie James Dean, a television adaptation of the biography written by James Dean's friend and writer Bill Bast. McHattie appeared in several mini-series, including Centennial and Roughnecks.

McHattie appeared in several episodes of Seinfeld (beginning with "The Pitch") as Dr. Reston, Elaine Benes's manipulative psychiatrist boyfriend; he also appeared in two episodes of The X-Files. From 1998 to 2000, he had a recurring role in the Canadian-made TV series Emily of New Moon, based upon the 1923 novel by Lucy Maud Montgomery. From 1999-2001, he portrayed Sgt. Frank Coscarella in the Canadian police procedural drama, Cold Squad. Since 2005, he has appeared as Captain Healy, Massachusetts State Police Homicide Division Commander, in the first eight of the Jesse Stone series TV movies, which are based on the novels of Robert B. Parker. He did not appear in the ninth instalment however. He appeared in the pilot of Sabbatical, voiced the villain The Shade in Justice League, and portrayed Hollis Mason, the first Nite Owl, in the film adaptation of Watchmen.

McHattie had a well-received appearance in the sixth season episode "In the Pale Moonlight" of Star Trek: Deep Space Nine, as Romulan Senator Vreenak, who is the target of a Federation false flag operation to deceive the Romulan Empire into declaring war on the Dominion. The episode has often been cited as one of the best episodes of Star Trek ever produced, and McHattie’s reading of the line “It’s a fake!” has been ranked amongst the greatest moments in Star Trek and spawned an online meme.

In 2009, McHattie appeared in the Canadian IFC film Pontypool and in the Canadian thriller Summer's Blood as Gant Hoxey, alongside Twilight actress Ashley Greene, who portrays Summer. He co-starred with Felicia Day and Kavan Smith in the Gothic adaptation of Red Riding Hood, Red: Werewolf Hunter. In 2015, he appeared in the supernatural thriller Pay the Ghost.

== Personal life ==
McHattie is married to actress Lisa Houle, with whom he has three children. He was previously married to actress Meg Foster. His older brother is actor Wendell Smith.

== Filmography ==
=== Film ===
Stephen McHattie film credits
Year	Title	Role	Notes
1970	The People Next Door	Artie Mason	
1971	Von Richthofen and Brown	Werner Voss	
1975	The Ultimate Warrior	Robert	
1976	Moving Violation	Eddie Moore	
1978	Tomorrow Never Comes	Frank	
1978	Gray Lady Down	Murphy	
1982	Death Valley	Hal	
1984	Best Revenge	Brett	
1986	Belizaire the Cajun	James Willoughby	
1987	Salvation!	Revered Edward Randall	
1987	Caribe	Whitehale	
1988	Sticky Fingers	Eddie	
1988	Call Me	Jellybean	
1989	Bloodhounds of Broadway	Red Henry	
1989	One Man Out	Erik	
1993	The Dark	Gary 'Hunter' Henderson	
1993	Geronimo: An American Legend	Schoonover	
1994	Beverly Hills Cop III	Steve Fulbright	
1994	Life with Billy	Billy Stafford	
1994	Art Deco Detective	Hyena	
1996	My Friend Joe	Curt	
1997	Pterodactyl Woman from Beverly Hills	Dr. Egbert Drum	
1998	The Climb	Jack McLaskin	
1998	BASEketball	Narrator (voice)	
2000	The Highwayman	Frank Drake	
2002	Secretary	Burt Holloway	
2003	Twist	The Senator	
2005	The Lazarus Child	Chief Prosecutor Warner	
2005	A History of Violence	Leland	
2005	The Rocket	Dick Irvin	
2006	The Fountain	Grand Inquisitor Silecio	
2006	The Covenant	William Danvers III	
2006	300	Loyalist	
2007	KAW	Clyde	
2007	Poor Boy's Game	Uncle Joe	
2007	All Hat	Earl Stanton	
2007	Cursing Hanley	The Astounding Lew	Short film
2007	Shoot 'Em Up	Hammerson	
2008	Pontypool	Grant Mazzy	
2009	You Might as Well Live	Fred Steinke	
2009	Watchmen	Hollis Mason / Nite Owl I	
2009	The Timekeeper	Fisk	
2009	Summer's Blood	Gant Hoxey	
2009	The Deaths of Chet Baker	Chet Baker	Short film
2009	2012	Captain Michaels	
2010	This Movie Is Broken	Bouncer	
2010	Die	Jonah Odessa	
2010	Score: A Hockey Musical	Walt Acorn	
2010	Red: Werewolf Hunter	Gabriel	
2010	A Beginner's Guide to Endings	Fitz	
2011	The Maiden Danced to Death	Ernie	
2011	The Entitled	Clifford Jones	
2011	Exit Humanity	Medic Johnson	
2011	Irvine Welsh's Ecstasy	Jim Buist	
2011	Eddie	Ronny	
2011	Immortals	Cassander	
2012	The Tall Man	Lt. Dodd	
2012	A Little Bit Zombie	Max	
2012	Exile (Exil)	Maxwell	
2013	Haunter	The Pale Man	
2013	Septic Man	Mayor	
2013	Torment	Officer Hawkings	
2013	Meetings with a Young Poet	Samuel Beckett	
2014	Wolves	John Tollerman	
2014	Big Muddy	Stan Barlow	
2014	Dr. Cabbie	Pete Donaldson	
2014	Hellmouth	Charlie Baker	
2015	Born to Be Blue	Chesney Baker Sr.	
2015	Pay the Ghost	The Blind Man	
2016	Weirdos	Priest	
2017	Mother!	Zealot	
2017	The Sound	Earl	
2017	Awakening the Zodiac	Zodiac	
2017	Juggernaut	Hank Sr.	
2018	Death Wish	Chief of Detectives	
2018	Crown and Anchor	Gus	
2018	Angelique's Isle	Mackay	
2019	Come to Daddy	Gordon	
2019	Dreamland	The Maestro / Johnny Deadeyes	
2019	Rabid	Dr. Michael Keloid	
2020	Most Wanted	Frank Cooper	
2023	My Animal	Henry	
2024	Deaner '89	Dack	
2025	Little Lorraine	Huey	
2026	Permanent Damage	Mr. Freeman	

=== Television ===
Stephen McHattie television credits
Year	Title	Role	Notes
1974	Adam-12	Skip	Episode: "Roll Call"
1974	The Lady's Not for Burning	Nicholas	Television film
1974	Kojak	Paul Nelson	Episode: "Slay Ride"
1975	Search for the Gods	Willie Longfellow	Television film
1975	Starsky & Hutch	William Michael "Billy" Desmond	Episode: "Terror on the Docks"
1976	James Dean	James Dean	Television film
1976	Look What's Happened to Rosemary's Baby	Adrian/Andrew	Television film
1977	Kojak	Blaine	Episode: "The Summer of '69"
1978–79	Centennial	Jacques 'Jake' Pasquinel	11 episodes
1979	Highcliffe Manor	Rev. Ian Glenville	6 episodes
1979	Lou Grant	Curtis Folger	Episode: "Frame-Up"
1979	Mary and Joseph: A Story of Faith	Judah	Television film
1980	Roughnecks	Roy Bethke	Television film
1981	Hill Street Blues	Off. Jerry Nash	2 episodes
1985	The Hitchhiker	Joe Caldwell; Johnny	2 episodes
1986	The Equalizer	Eddie Washburn	Episode: "Out of the Past"
1986	Spenser: For Hire	Corbett	Episode: "Brother to Dragons"
1986	Guiding Light	Gerhart	TV series
1987	Mariah	Rick	Episode: "Equations"
1987	Crime Story	Carlo Mastrangelo	Episode: "The Senator, the Movie Star, and the Mob"
1988	Tales from the Darkside	Robert Perry	Episode: "Family Reunion"
1989	Life Under Water		Television film
1989	Miami Vice	Atty. Sam Boyle	Episode: "Fruit of the Poison Tree"
1989	The Twilight Zone	Death	Episode: "Rendezvous in a Dark Place"
1989–90	Beauty and the Beast	Gabriel	8 episodes
1991	Law & Order	Joe Pilefsky	Episode: "The Torrents of Greed"
1991	Counterstrike	Nick	Episode: "Going Home"
1991–92	Scene of the Crime	Various	TV series
1992	Terror on Track 9	Randolph Darnell	Television film
1992	Seinfeld	Dr. Reston	4 episodes
1993	Secret Service	Sweet	Episode: "The High Cost of Living/Impostors"
1993	L.A. Law	Gordon Reeve	Episode: "Hello and Goodbye"
1993	Quantum Leap	Stawpah	Episode: "Mirror Image"
1993	The Hidden Room	Jack	Episode: "Love Crimes"
1994	Life with Billy	Billy Stafford	Television film
1994	Northern Exposure	Turk Tortelli	Episode: "Fish Story"
1994	Jonathan Stone: Threat of Innocence	Lt. Durant	Television film
1994	Kung Fu: The Legend Continues	Diablo the Deceiver	Episode: "Magic Trick"
1994	Highlander	Michael Kent	Episode: "The Samurai"
1995	Nonnie & Alex	Alex's Dad	Short film
1995	M.A.N.T.I.S.	Gerald Ravens	Episode: "Switches"
1995	Deadlocked: Escape from Zone 14	Jack Claremont	Television film
1995	Convict Cowboy	Jagges	Television film
1995	Deadly Love	Sean O'Connor	Television film
1995	Remember Me	Chief Nat Coogan	Television film
1995	Visitors of the Night	Bryan English	Television film
1995	The X-Files	Red-Haired Man	2 episodes
1995	Theodore Rex	Edge	Video
1996	The Outer Limits	Dr. Sherrick	Episode: "Beyond the Veil"
1996	The Lazarus Man	Mac	Episode: "Purgatory"
1996	JAG	Gunnery Sergeant Ray Crockett	Episode: "High Ground"
1996	Walker, Texas Ranger	Karl Mayes	Episode: "Redemption"
1998	American Whiskey Bar	A	Television film
1998	The Hunger	Strike	Episode: "The Face of Helene Bournouw"
1998	The Magnificent Seven	Cletus Fowler	Episode: "Nemesis"
1998	Star Trek: Deep Space Nine	Senator Vreenak	Episode: "In the Pale Moonlight"
1998	Midnight Flight	Lt. Jack Kelly	Television film
1998	Poltergeist: The Legacy	Leigh Noir	Episode: "The Prodigy"
1998	Lexx	E.J. Moss	Episode: "Lyekka"
1998–2000	Emily of New Moon	Jimmy Murray	43 episodes
1999	Walker, Texas Ranger	Thomas Openshaw	Episode: "In Harm's Way"
1999–2001	Cold Squad	Sgt. Frank Coscarella	33 episodes
2000	Canada: A People's History	General Isaac Brock	TV series
2000	La Femme Nikita	Willie Kane	Episode: "Sympathy for the Devil"
2000	The Hustle	Pierce	Television film
2002	Lexx	E.J. Moss	2 episodes
2002	Monk	Lt. Adam Kirk	Episode: "Mr. Monk Goes to the Carnival"
2002	Mutant X	Aaron Gaumont	Episode: "Power Play"
2002	Birds of Prey	Al Hawke	Episode: "Sins of the Mother"
2002–2003	Justice League	Shade (voice)	5 episodes
2003	Blue Murder	Supt. Frank Simmons	Episode: "Ambush"
2003	Wall of Secrets	Hugh	Television film
2003	Star Trek: Enterprise	Alien Foreman	Episode: "The Xindi"
2005	Jesse Stone: Stone Cold	Captain Healy	Television film
2005	The 4400	Dravitt	Episode: "Voices Carry"
2005	Ice Age Columbus: Who Were the First Americans?	Attan	Television film
2006	One Dead Indian	Police Field Commander	Television film
2006	Jesse Stone: Night Passage	Captain Healy	Television film
2006	Puppets Who Kill	Mr. Swain	Episode: "The Rival House"
2006	Jesse Stone: Death in Paradise	Captain Healy	Television film
2006	Solar Attack	Admiral Lawrence	Television film
2006	Absolution	Mike Lloyd	Television film
2007	The Dark Room	Duncan Allbright	Television film
2007	Killer Wave	Edgard Powell	2 episodes
2007	Jesse Stone: Sea Change	Captain Healy	Television film
2007	Sabbatical	Police Chief Gil Brewer	TV series
2008	The Trojan Horse	Jack Shea	Miniseries
2008	Would Be Kings		Miniseries
2008	XIII: The Conspiracy	General Carrington	Miniseries
2008	The Summit	Tate	2 episodes
2008–09	Murdoch Mysteries	Harry Murdoch	2 episodes
2009	Diamonds	Llewellyn Anderson	Miniseries
2009	Jesse Stone: Thin Ice	Captain Healy	Television film
2009	Reaper	Sheriff	Episode: "Underbelly"
2009	The Listener	Arthur Stebbes	Episode: "Missing"
2009	Guns	Inspector Clay	Miniseries
2009	Fringe	Col. Raymond Gordon	Episode: "Fracture"
2010	Bloodletting & Miraculous Cures	Dr. Standish	Episode: "Code Clock"
2010	Who Is Clark Rockefeller?	Mark Sutton	Television film
2010	Keep Your Head Up, Kid: The Don Cherry Story	Eddie Shore	Episode: "Part 1"
2010	Jesse Stone: No Remorse	Commander Healy	Television film
2010	Happy Town	Carl Bravin	4 episodes
2010	Haven	Rev. Ed Driscoll	Recurring cast, season 2
2010	Red: Werewolf Hunter	Gabriel	Television film
2011	Moby Dick	Rachel Captain	2 episodes
2011	Jesse Stone: Innocents Lost	Commander Healy	Television film
2011	XIII: The Series	President Carrington	Main cast
2012	Jesse Stone: Benefit of the Doubt	Commander Healy	Television film
2012	The Wrath of Grapes: The Don Cherry Story II	Eddie Shore	TV miniseries
2014	Lizzie Borden Took an Ax	Andrew Borden	Television film
2014	The Strain	Vaun	TV series
2015	Beauty and the Beast	Mr. Zalman	Episode: "Heart of the Matter"
2016	Tokyo Trial	Edward Stuart McDougall	Miniseries
2017	Orphan Black	Percival T. Westmorland/John Mathieson	Recurring role, Season 5
2020	October Faction	Samuel Allen	Recurring role
2023	Essex County	Lou	Main role
2024	Sullivan's Crossing	Jonathan	Episode: "Secrets"
2024	Accused	Joe	Episode: "Justin's Story"
2024	The Madness	Emmett	3 episodes

== Partial stage credits ==
Stephen McHattie film credits
Year	Title	Role	Venue	Notes	Ref.
1968	Henry IV, Part 1	Edmund Mortimer	Delacorte Theater, New York		
1968	Henry IV, Part 2	Lord Bardolph	Delacorte Theater, New York		
1968	The American Dream	The Young Man	Billy Rose Theatre, New York	Broadway debut	
1972	Twelfth Night	Sebastian	Vivian Beaumont Theater, New York		
1972	Hamlet	Laertes	Long Wharf Theatre, New Haven		
1972	Mourning Becomes Electra	Orin Mannon	Circle in the Square Theatre, New York		
1973-74	The Iceman Cometh	Don Parritt	Circle in the Square Theatre, New York		
1975	Afore Night Come	Jeff	Long Wharf Theatre, New Haven		
1979	The Winter Dancers	Carver	Marymount Manhattan Theatre, New York		
1981	Mary Stuart		Ahmanson Theatre, Los Angeles		
1983	The Misanthrope	Alceste	Circle in the Square Theatre, New York	Replacement	
1983-84	Heartbreak House	Hector Hushabye	Circle in the Square Theatre, New York		
1984	Mensch Meier	Otto Meier	Stage 73, New York		
1986-87	You Never Can Tell	Mr. Bohun	Circle in the Square Theatre, New York		
1989	Ghetto	Kittel	Circle in the Square Theatre, New York		
1991	Macbeth	Macbeth	Playhouse 91, New York		
1992	Search and Destroy	Dr. Waxling	Circle in the Square Theatre, New York		

== Awards and nominations ==
Institution	Year	Category	Work	Result
ACTRA Awards	2019	Outstanding Performance - Male	Crown and Anchor	Won
Atlantic International Film Festival	2025	Outstanding Performance	Little Lorraine	Won
Bucheon International Fantastic Film Festival	2009	Best Actor	Pontypool	Won
Canadian Screen Awards	2021	Best Supporting Actor	Come to Daddy	Nominated
Drama Desk Awards	1989	Outstanding Actor in a Play	Ghetto	Nominated
Fangoria Chainsaw Awards	2008	Best Actor	Pontypool	Nominated
Fangoria Chainsaw Awards	2014	Best Supporting Actor	Haunter	Nominated
Fangoria Chainsaw Awards	2021	Best Supporting Actor	Come to Daddy	Nominated
Genie Awards	2007	Best Performance by an Actor in a Supporting Role	The Rocket	Won
Genie Awards	2010	Best Performance by an Actor in a Leading Role	Pontypool	Won
Gemini Awards	1995	Best Actor in a Dramatic Program or Mini-Series	Life with Billy	Won
Gemini Awards	1998	Best Actor in a Continuing Leading Dramatic Role	Emily of New Moon	Nominated
Gemini Awards	1999	Best Actor in a Dramatic Program or Mini-Series	American Whiskey Bar	Nominated
Gemini Awards	2008	Best Performance by an Actor in a Guest Role, Dramatic Series	Murdoch Mysteries	Nominated
Jutra Awards	2010	Best Supporting Actor	The Timekeeper	Nominated
Jutra Awards	2015	Best Supporting Actor	Meetings with a Young Poet	Nominated
Obie Awards	1984	Distinguished Performance by an Actor	Mensch Meier	Won
Vancouver Film Critics Circle	2010	Best Actor in a Canadian Film	Pontypool	Nominated
