= Ejecta (film) =

- Directed by: Chad Archibald; Matt Wiele
- Written by: Tony Burgess
- Starring: Julian Richings, Lisa Houle, Adam Seybold
- Cinematography: Cody Calahan; Devin Lund
- Edited by: Chad Archibald; Matt Wiele
- Music by: Steph Copeland
- Production company: Foresight Features
- Distributed by: Anchor Bay Canada
- Release date: August 3, 2014 (Fantasia Festival)
- Running time: 87 minutes
- Country: Canada
- Language: English

Ejecta is a 2014 Canadian science fiction horror film directed by Chad Archibald and Matt Wiele. The film's script was written by Tony Burgess and stars Julian Richings as a man that has experienced an extraterrestrial encounter. Ejecta had its world premiere on August 3, 2014 at Fantasia Festival and Canadian film rights were purchased by Anchor Bay Canada.

== Synopsis ==
Filmmaker Joe Sullivan becomes excited when he receives an email from famously reclusive alien abductee William Cassidy. Believing that Cassidy wishes to grant him an exclusive interview, Sullivan travels to the address given. Along the way, he sees military vehicles, including tanks. When Sullivan arrives, Cassidy is uncooperative. Cassidy claims to have never heard of Sullivan and to have never sent an email, though he eventually relents to an interview. After briefly attempting to describe the psychological torture he suffered from his abduction, Cassidy explains that an upcoming solar flare, and the resulting coronal mass ejection, will disrupt all electronic devices on Earth.

Some time later, soldiers raid the house and wound Cassidy as they take him into custody. Cassidy wakes in a military bunker. After soldiers rough up Cassidy, Dr. Tobin enters and interrogates him. When he refuses to answer her questions, she orders the soldiers to hit him. Soldiers retrieve Sullivan's footage, and Tobin watches it while she waits for soldiers to retrieve alien torture devices. In the footage, Sullivan and Cassidy further discuss Cassidy's abduction, and Cassidy explains how he has woken up in various distant places after blackouts, including floating on top of water and apparently having dissected a horse. When Sullivan's footage shows a UFO crash land, Tobin orders the soldiers to investigate.

The first alien torture device reveals memories from victims, though it destroys their consciousness. The device fails to affect Cassidy, and the feedback kills Tobin's assistant, Heather. Impressed, Tobin tells Cassidy that he is the first person to survive the device intact. As soldiers retrieve a second device, Cassidy and Tobin watch more of Sullivan's footage. In it, an alien chases Sullivan and Cassidy back to Cassidy's house, where they barricade themselves in the attic. After arming themselves with a shotgun, they shoot and kill the alien. Over Sullivan's protestations, Cassidy dissects the alien and finds it contains the same kind of mind-control implant used on himself.

Tobin reveals humanity was contacted by aliens 1300 years ago and have been attempting to reestablish contact since then. The second alien torture device proves similarly ineffective. In an alien voice, Cassidy says they will all suffer – Tobin most of all. Tobin gloats that they killed an alien 60 years ago and shoots Cassidy in the head, killing him; at the same time, Heather rises from the dead and repeats the same threat. Tobin shoots her, too. The soldiers encounter Sullivan, wound him, and after discovering that he is still alive, take him to the bunker under Tobin's orders. When Sullivan's final footage reveals he was abducted as he escaped the military raid, Tobin becomes worried and orders the soldiers to abort. In response, all she hears are their screams as they die.

Cassidy revives from the dead, and Tobin begs him to help her. Cassidy tells her the aliens like him but caused him to suffer unimaginably; he can not conceive of what they will do to her. Tobin watches video surveillance feeds helplessly as Sullivan, possessed by the aliens, kills all the soldiers in the bunker. When Sullivan reaches Tobin and Cassidy, Cassidy pleads with him to remove the implant. Sullivan retrieves a glowing ball of energy from Cassidy's head, killing Cassidy, and places it in Tobin's head, which begins to glow. As government reinforcements arrive, a stricken Tobin raises her pistol to her head and commits suicide. She suddenly jerks awake again, and unsuccessfully makes another attempt, having finally emptied her magazine. In his house, Sullivan records a video blog where he complains the trip was a waste of his time, as nothing happened.

== Cast ==
- Julian Richings as William Cassidy
- Lisa Houle as Dr. Tobin
- Adam Seybold as Joe Sullivan
- Mark Gibson as Agent Brinkman
- Justin Darmanin as Agent Falco
- Ry Barrett as Agent Higgins
- Tony Burgess as Griffin Jones
- Cat Hostick as Heather (as Cathryn Hostick)
- Ari Millen as Agent Rudder

== Reception ==
Dread Central praised Ejecta for its script, writing "On the surface Ejecta is a twisting tale of sci-fi horror involving shadowy figures, terrestrial or otherwise; but Burgess, never one to spoon feed you answers, slides in the subtext in an almost inconspicuous manner, compelling the viewer to truly think about what they just watched." Shock Till You Drop also praised Burgess's script in their review and stated that while the film's aliens "do bring some scares, the real horror is the way it toys with the mortality of people and the planet."
