= Tony Burgess (author) =

Canadian novelist and screenwriter

- Born: 7 September 1959 (age 67); Toronto, Ontario
- Occupations: Novelist, screenwriter
- Writing career
- Genres: Fiction, suspense, literary fiction
- Notable works: Pontypool; Pontypool Changes Everything

Tony Burgess (born 7 September 1959) is a Canadian novelist and screenwriter. His most notable works include the 1998 novel Pontypool Changes Everything and the screenplay for the film adaptation of that same novel, Pontypool.

Burgess' unique style of writing has been called literary horror fiction and described as "blended ultra-violent horror and absurdist humour, inflicting nightmarish narratives on the quirky citizens of small-town Ontario: think H. P. Lovecraft meets Stephen Leacock."

== Early life ==
Burgess was born in Toronto on 7 September 1959, and grew up in Mississauga. He graduated in 1978 from Applewood Heights Secondary School in Mississauga, despite having to use day passes from a medium security facility in order to finish high school. Burgess served three months in this security facility for robbing a convenience store with a friend while wearing one of his mother's blouses, inspired after watching A Clockwork Orange and Straight Time.

Burgess then moved back to Toronto where he became a fixture on the art and music scene on Toronto's Queen Street West under the name Tony Blue. He performed poetry as an opening act to punk bands and other acts such as Lydia Lunch usually writing what he would be reading, the day of the reading. He also exhibited his paintings, including a solo show at the Xiphotec Gallery and interior and window designs for the Toxic Empire.

During this time, Burgess was banned from Toronto's Hotel Isabella when he drank too much alcohol with a friend and tried to burn the hotel down by lighting paper on top of some of the tables within the hotel.

In 1989, Burgess enrolled at the University of Toronto. Six years later, in 1995 he graduated with a degree in semiotics. In 1998, Burgess and his wife, Rachel Jones, moved from their flat in Toronto's Parkdale neighbourhood to a "shack by the river" in Wasaga Beach, Ontario. At this time, Burgess had a brief musical theatre career during which he starred as Curly in the town's local theatre production of Oklahoma!.

Burgess has also at one time played in a band called The Ether Brothers, and had jobs as a telephone psychic and as a factory worker at a vinegar factory.

== Personal life ==
Burgess is a close friend of fellow novelist Derek McCormack. He is married to crown attorney Rachel Jones, with whom he has two children named Griffin and Camille. They reside in the Stayner area of Clearview, Ontario, where they live in the former Thistlewaite residence, which is locally famous for supposedly being haunted; built in 1882, it previously served the community's funerary needs and its yard is rumoured to host many buried suitcases filled with the corpses of a previous owner's pet cats.

== Publications ==
- The Hellmouths of Bewdley (1997) ECW Press
- Pontypool Changes Everything (1998) ECW Press
- Caesarea (1999) ECW Press
- Fiction for Lovers: A Small Bouquet of Flesh, Fear, Larvae, and Love (2003) ECW Press
- Ravenna Gets (2010) Anvil Press
- People Live Still in Cashtown Corners (2010) ChiZine Publications
- Idaho Winter (2011) ECW Press
- The n-Body Problem (2013) ChiZine Publications

Burgess has also published criticism, fiction and poetry in numerous national and international newspapers, journals, periodicals and magazines.

In 2009, Burgess wrote and performed a musical revue entitled Die! Scream! Die! alongside fellow novelist Derek McCormack at the Scream Literary Festival. Burgess has also facilitated a few workshops at the Toronto New School of Writing.

=== The Pontypool Trilogy ===
This trilogy includes The Hellmouths of Bewdley, Pontypool Changes Everything and Caesarea.

==== The Hellmouths of Bewdley ====
This is the first book in the Pontypool Trilogy.

This is a collection of sixteen short stories, featuring such things as insane doctors, supernatural dogs, dead men, and a real ninja turtle, all within the small Ontario town of Bewdley.

==== Pontypool Changes Everything ====
This is the second novel in the Pontypool Trilogy.

In this novel, an outbreak of a strange plague, AMPS (Acquired Metastructural Pediculosis), causes people across Ontario to slip into aphasia and then into a cannibalistic zombie rage. AMPS is transferred through language and the only way to stop its spread is to outlaw communication. This metaphysical, deconstructionist virus requires a multi-disciplinary approach and doctors, semioticians, linguists, anthropologists, and even art critics present theories as to its source and treatment.

The director of the movie adaptation of Pontypool Changes Everything, Bruce McDonald has described the virus as having three stages, "The first stage is you might begin to repeat a word. Something gets stuck. And usually it's words that are terms of endearment, like sweetheart or honey. The second stage is your language becomes scrambled and you can't express yourself properly. The third stage is that you become so distraught at your condition that the only way out of the situation you feel, as an infected person, is to try and chew your way through the mouth of another person." McDonald also stressed that the victims of the virus detailed in the film were not zombies, instead calling them "conversationalists."

==== Caesarea ====
This is the third novel in the Pontypool Trilogy.

In this novel something mysterious causes insomnia among the inhabitants of the sleepy little town of Caesarea. This insomnia causes many strange things to happen, such as the town's figurehead mayor being replaced by a dwarf doppelganger and Neo-Nazi environmentalists accidentally unleashing purveyors of kiddie snuff-porn on the town. A so-called war is also being waged between the town's respectable citizenry and the white trash from the trailer park.

=== Fiction for Lovers: A Small Bouquet of Flesh, Fear, Larvae, and Love ===
This is a collection of nine short prose stories with principal characters "Tony" and "Rachel" who are based on Burgess and his wife. The pieces range across a variety of different genres, from the mundane autobiographical fiction to lurid true crime to phantasmagoria.

=== Ravenna Gets ===
This is a collection of "wheeled stories" in which the citizens of Ravenna inexplicably and collectively decide to kill off the entire population of the nearby town of Collingwood. Each story revolves around a unique and violent act of homicide.

The inspiration for this novel was news coverage of the fall of Baghdad and its aftermath.

=== People Live Still in Cashtown Corners ===
This novel is about Bob Clark who lives and works in Cashtown Corners. In fact, he's the only resident of the tiny rural town. Bob has never really felt like himself whenever other people are around, and feeling normal is all he wants in life. One day, Bob decides that the only way to truly be himself is to murder anyone who makes him feel abnormal; which is everyone. The narrator is modelled after John List, a New Jersey man who killed his wife, mother and three kids and successfully eluded arrest for almost 18 years (when he was captured he was living under the name "Bob Clark").

Burgess has described the novel as, "an intimate first-person account of someone who realizes that he must kill others in order to keep his own disintegration at bay and his frantic attempts to rescue secondary versions of himself where this is not true and make them primary."

This novel took Burgess only nine days to finish.

=== Idaho Winter ===
This novel follows a boy, Idaho Winter who is loathed by everyone in the town where he lives. He then meets a young girl named Madison who empathizes with his suffering, opening a terrible world of pain in him. When Madison is attacked by dogs meant to harm Idaho, Idaho changes the course of the entire story. He soon learns that his suffering has been cruelly designed by a clumsy writer who has made his book meaner than all the others to make it stand out. With this information, Idaho locks the author in a closet and runs off, armed with the knowledge that the entire world is invented and that he now has the power to imagine it differently. When the author emerges from the closet and discovers that Idaho has made a mess of the novel, he sets out to find a cure to the story and bring its heart and mind together.

In this novel there are allusions to classic children's fare, ranging from The Neverending Story to the Choose Your Own Adventure series – tales that play with the idea of readers and characters controlling the narrative.

The point in the novel when two characters suddenly switch genders was unintentional. According to Burgess: "I came back to the story after leaving it aside for two years and I was confused myself—then I decided, 'Oh well, that works here.'"

Idaho Winter is Tony Burgess' first novel for young adults, although it has been called a young adult parody.

This is the only novel by Tony Burgess that is not set in an Ontario town.

=== The n-Body Problem ===
This novel follows a zombie apocalypse that leaves nothing more than a waste disposal problem. After a number of failed experiments at disposal, officials hit on the solution to the problem of aimless, lifeless wanderers clogging the streets: send the dead into orbit. However, the celestial corpses begin to affect the Earth's sunlight, resulting in "Syndrome" – a blend of paranoia, depression, and hypochondria that turns the living into monsters of a different sort.

== Film credits ==
Pontypool has been made into live stage productions in the United States and the United Kingdom.

Originally, the film Pontypool was to be a radio play for CBC Radio.

Burgess wrote out a script for Pontypool in 48 hours, his approach inspired by Orson Welles' radio broadcast of The War of the Worlds. He also played in the film adaption of Pontypool and in the science fiction film Ejecta.

Burgess has also been a singer with the rock band Lucy Jinx (formally known as Left by Snakes), alongside guitarist Chuck Baker. Burgess and Baker received a Canadian Screen Award nomination for Best Original Song at the 11th Canadian Screen Awards in 2023 for "The Ascension Song", written for the film Cult Hero.

=== Screenplay ===
- Pontypool (2008)
- Music from the Big House (2010)
- Septic Man (2013)
- Ejecta (2014)
- Hellmouth (2014)
- The Hexecutioners (2015)
- Saturn's Rings (2016)
- The Hoard (2018)
- Dreamland (2019)
- Cult Hero (2022)
- The Hyperborean (2023)
- Cashtown Corners (TBA)

=== Actor ===
- Pontypool (Tony(Lawrence)) (2008)
- Exit Humanity (Victim) (2011)
- Ejecta (Griffin Jones) (2014)
- Hellmouth (Tips) (2014)
- The Hexecutioners (Milos Somborac) (2015)
- The Hoard (2018)
- To Hell with Harvey (2019)
- Cult Hero (2022)
- The Hyperborean (2023)

=== Soundtrack ===
- Pontypool (The Nefud Desert) (2008)

== Nominations/awards ==
- Pontypool Changes Everything (Winner, Best Book of 1998 by NOW magazine)
- Pontypool (Nominated, Best Adapted Screenplay, 2010 Genie Award)
- Ravenna Gets (Winner, Short Fiction Category, 2011 ReLit Award)
- Idaho Winter (Nominated, 2012 Ontario Trillium Award)

== Recurring themes ==
Burgess often sets his work in the towns and villages of rural Southern Ontario, including Bewdley, Pontypool, Collingwood and Cashtown Corners.

Outbreaks of sudden violence is an idea explored in many of Burgess' works.

In both Ravenna Gets and People Live Still in Cashtown Corners, Burgess explores the idea of "people suddenly being absolutely not what you think they are."

Burgess likes to include photos and images in many of his works, such as Ravenna Gets, Idaho Winter and People Live Still in Cashtown Corners. He often takes these photographs himself. He especially likes using pictures that aren't of anything or representative of looking.

== Influences ==
When speaking about his beginnings as a writer, Burgess stated, "I recognized early that something was wrong, I was definitely not having the same experience as other people around me, which would just be what it was except there was this peculiar making in the middle of it…. I used to draw at this age, horrible violent, busy pictures that my parents would hide from people and worse."

Burgess has said that the writers that he read as a teenager, such as Alfred Jarry, Comte de Lautréamont, Guillaume Apollinaire, Jean Genet, Alain Robbe-Grillet and André Gide made the biggest impression on him.

He also enjoys Shirley by Charlotte Brontë "because it starts out so stable then distorts in mysterious ways ... characters vaporize and duplicate, dog bites infect out of the dark, people slip into narcotic winters."

He has also said the reason he began writing was because his mother told him he was good at it.

Burgess' inspiration comes from many different places such as his life, his past, things he sees, people and sometimes tiny random "events."
