= Pontypool (film) =

2008 film by Bruce McDonald

- Promotional film poster
- Directed by: Bruce McDonald
- Screenplay by: Tony Burgess
- Based on: Pontypool Changes Everything by Tony Burgess
- Produced by: Jeffrey Coghlan; Ambrose Roche
- Starring: Stephen McHattie; Lisa Houle; Georgina Reilly; Hrant Alianak
- Cinematography: Miroslaw Baszak
- Edited by: Jeremiah Munce
- Music by: Claude Foisy
- Production companies: Ponty Up Pictures; Shadow Shows
- Distributed by: Maple Pictures
- Release dates: September 6, 2008 (Toronto International Film Festival); March 6, 2009
- Running time: 96 minutes
- Country: Canada
- Languages: English; French
- Box office: $32,118

Pontypool (stylized as POИTYPOOL) is a 2008 Canadian psychological horror thriller film directed by Bruce McDonald and written by Tony Burgess, based on his 1995 novel Pontypool Changes Everything. A spin-off, Dreamland, was released in 2019. As of 2023, the two other films in the Ponty franchise's trilogy, Pontypool Changes and Pontypool Changes Everything, have been in active development since 2016.

== Plot ==
The film begins with an oscilloscope display of the waves of radio announcer Grant Mazzy's radio monologue. As the monologue goes on, the oscilloscope image shows a small bubble appear and grow to almost bursting. This turns out to be the key to the film: Mazzy's monologue has released a virus into the language.

In the small town of Pontypool, Ontario, Grant Mazzy is driving on his way to work. When he pulls over to stop in the middle of a snowstorm, he is startled by a woman banging against his window while repeating an indistinct word, then seemingly repeating Mazzy's utterings before staggering away.

At the radio station, Grant's shock jock style and on-air persona entertain his technical assistant, Laurel-Ann, while irritating his station manager, Sydney. Helicopter reporter Ken Loney calls in with a report about a riot at the office of Dr. Jon Mendez that has resulted in numerous deaths. After Ken is unexpectedly cut off, the group tries to confirm his report, but their witnesses are disconnected before being put on the airwaves. After they are contacted by the BBC for breaking the story, Ken calls back and says he has taken refuge in a grain silo. He describes the rioters as trying to eat one another or even themselves. When one of the rioters attacks the silo, Ken's call is interrupted by an audio transmission in French.

Laurel-Ann translates the transmission, which is an instruction to remain indoors, not to use terms of endearment, baby talk, rhetorical discourse, or the English language and not to translate the message. Pontypool is declared to be under quarantine. A confused and disbelieving Grant attempts to leave, but a horde of people attacks the station, and Grant, Sydney, and Laurel-Ann lock themselves inside. As Laurel-Ann shows signs of instability, Dr. Mendez arrives at the radio station through a window and hides with Grant and Sydney in the soundproof booth. Ken calls in and, while on the air, succumbs to the virus. Laurel-Ann begins to slam her head against the sound booth's window and chews off her lower lip. Mendez hypothesizes that a virus has infected certain words in the English language; only certain words infect certain people who then find another person to kill themselves with. Sydney receives a call from her children, only to hear them becoming infected. Outside the booth, Laurel-Ann vomits a large amount of blood and drops dead. Mendez suspects this has happened since she failed to find a victim.

The horde then breaks into the radio station, attacking the sound booth. Sydney records a loop of Grant's voice and plays it on an outside speaker to draw the mob away. Mendez starts repeating the word "breathe", but immediately starts speaking Armenian upon realizing that the virus is exclusive to the English language, which prevents the virus from infecting him. In response, Grant and Sydney start speaking French. When the recording fails, the mob returns but Mendez lures them away, saving Sydney and Grant, who now lock themselves in the equipment room.

While Grant tries to figure out how to reverse the symptom, Sydney begins obsessively writing on the walls and door, and is infected by the word "kill". Grant convinces her that the word "kill" now means "kiss" and her symptoms subside. Hoping to stop the virus, the pair go on the air, spouting a series of self-contradicting and confusing phrases to help their infected listeners, ignoring warnings from the authorities trying to get them off the air. While an amplified voice from outside counts down from ten, Sydney joins Grant in the booth and they kiss. An explosion can be heard when the film cuts to black.

Over the black, news reports of further outbreaks of the virus suggest that the quarantine failed, spread by the news itself and eventually reaching England, the source of its targeted language. In a post-credits scene, Sydney and Grant (now known as "Lisa the Killer" and "Johnny Deadeyes") survive the virus and continue speaking English by maintaining a system of improvisational roleplay as the screen shifts from black and white to color.

=== Alternative ending (radio play) ===
Whilst the radio play version of the story changes a few features, such as the more visual elements being restyled for audio or removed all together; it also features an alternative ending. In this ending when Grant convinces Sydney that "kill" now means "kiss" she asks Grant to "kiss" her (in the film version she says "kill" leading to them kissing).

Soon after when broadcasting his own obituaries of Laurel-Ann and Mendez (who Grant assumes will meet his demise eventually), he confirms the death of Sydney, implying that he "kissed" her at her request. Grant, now completely alone, realizes that he has become infected through the word "paper". Resigned to his fate, he allows himself to be taken by the word, repeating it over and over again, before finally uttering one different word: "trap".

== Cast ==
- Stephen McHattie as Grant Mazzy (Johnny Deadeyes)
- Lisa Houle as Sydney Briar (Lisa)
- Georgina Reilly as Laurel-Ann Drummond
- Hrant Alianak as Dr. Jon Mendez
- Rick Roberts as Ken Loney
- Boyd Banks as Jay (Osama)
- Tony Burgess as Tony (Lawrence)
- Rachel Burns as Colin (Daud)

== Production ==
Pontypool is based on Tony Burgess' novel Pontypool Changes Everything. Burgess adapted the material for the screen himself. According to McDonald, the writer hashed out a script in 48 hours. Orson Welles' infamous radio broadcast of The War of the Worlds inspired the approach that they decided to take. It was simultaneously produced as a motion picture and a radio play.

Filming took place in Toronto, Ontario, rather than in Pontypool itself.

At Rue Morgue's 2008 Festival of Fear expo, director Bruce McDonald stressed the victims of the virus detailed in the film were not zombies and called them "conversationalists". He described the stages of the disease:

There are three stages to this virus. The first stage is you might begin to repeat a word. Something gets stuck. And usually it's words that are terms of endearment like sweetheart or honey. The second stage is your language becomes scrambled and you can't express yourself properly. The third stage you become so distraught at your condition that the only way out of the situation you feel, as an infected person, is to try and chew your way through the mouth of another person.

According to McDonald, the final scene of Grant and Sydney, now presented in a kicker, was originally placed before the credits. However, audiences in early screenings found the original ending to be too confusing, so the scene was moved behind the credits instead.

== Release ==
The film was released theatrically in Canada on March 6, 2009. The film was released on DVD and Blu-ray on January 25, 2010.

Rue Morgue and ChiZine Publications held a special screening of Pontypool on December 3, 2010 at the Toronto Underground Cinema and following the screening, it featured a Q&A with Stephen McHattie, Lisa Houle, and Tony Burgess.

== Reception ==
Pontypool received generally positive reviews from critics, currently holding an 84% rating on Rotten Tomatoes based on 86 reviews with an average of 6.6/10. The consensus states: "Witty and restrained but still taut and funny, this Pontypool is a different breed of low-budget zombie film." On Metacritic, which uses an average of critics' reviews, the film has a rating of 54/100, indicating "mixed or average reviews".

In 2018, Consequence of Sound ranked Pontypool the 43rd "Scariest Movie Ever Made".

== Accolades ==
- 30th Genie Awards - Best Actor, Best Director, Best Adapted Screenplay (Nominated)

== Follow-ups ==
As of 2026, a direct sequel, Pontypool Changes, has been repeatedly teased (2009 for 2010 release, 2012 for 2013 release, and 2018 for 2019 release) as supposedly being in active development over the previous 17 years.

In May 2009, Pontypool Changes was confirmed to be in development, with McDonald returning as director for production in 2010. In July 2012, a teaser poster for the film was released at the Fantasia Film Festival, with an intended release date of 2013. In April 2018, McDonald and Burgess revealed that their film Dreamland, which ultimately saw release in 2019, would be a spin-off of Pontypool serving as "a sequel to the [film's] post-credit non-sequitur scene, with McHattie and Houle" reprising their roles. Burgess additionally confirmed that Pontypool Changes, also known as Typo Chan, would follow the English language virus passing into the written word, would feature McHattie and Houle reprising their roles, and would go into production by 2019.
