= Hellmouth (film) =

- Film poster
- Directed by: John Geddes
- Written by: Tony Burgess
- Starring: Stephen McHattie; Siobhan Murphy; Boyd Banks
- Cinematography: Jeff Maher
- Edited by: John Geddes
- Music by: Jeff Graville
- Production company: Foresight Features
- Release date: October 17, 2014 (TADFF)
- Running time: 95 minutes
- Country: Canada
- Language: English

Hellmouth is a 2014 Canadian horror film that was directed by John Geddes, based on a script written by Tony Burgess. The film had its world premiere on 17 October 2014 at the Toronto After Dark Film Festival and stars Stephen McHattie as a grave-keeper that finds himself traveling to hell to save the soul of a beautiful woman. Funding for Hellmouth was partially raised through an Indiegogo campaign.

== Synopsis ==
Terminally ill and stuck with a depressing job as a grave-keeper, Charlie (Stephen McHattie) only wants to retire to Florida and live out the rest of his remaining days in peace. His hopes are dashed, however, when his boss Mr. Whinny (Boyd Banks) has forced Charlie to take on a job at another cemetery and postpone his retirement plans for the indefinite future. While traveling to the cemetery, Charlie meets Faye (Siobhan Murphy), a beautiful hitchhiker. They share an instant romantic connection but their happiness is threatened by the fact that Charlie's new cemetery is actually a gateway to hell that puts both of them at risk.

== Cast ==
- Stephen McHattie as Charlie Baker
- Siobhan Murphy as Faye
- Boyd Banks as Mr. Whinny
- Julian Richings as Smiley
- Mark Gibson as Cliff Ryan
- Ari Millen as Harry
- Tony Burgess as Tips
- Adam Seybold as Mr. Praut
- Kate Fenton as Mrs. Praut
- Bruce McDonald as Kemp
- Jason David Brown as The Bargeman

== Reception ==
Critical reception for Hellmouth has been mostly positive. Dread Central praised the film for its visuals and for McHattie's acting, stating that they felt he was "quite simply the best man for this role". Bloody Disgusting was more mixed in their review, also praising McHattie while stating that "Ultimately the film suffers under both its heavy exposition and muddled second half."
