= Septic Man =

- Film poster
- Directed by: Jesse Thomas Cook
- Written by: Tony Burgess
- Produced by: Jesse Thomas Cook; Chad Archibald; Cody Calahan; John Geddes; Matt Wiele
- Starring: Jason David Brown; Molly Dunsworth; Robert Maillet
- Cinematography: Brendan Uegama
- Edited by: Jesse Thomas Cook
- Music by: Nate Kreiswirth
- Production company: Foresight Features
- Release date: September 19, 2013 (Austin Fantastic Fest)
- Running time: 83 minutes
- Country: Canada
- Language: English

Septic Man is a 2013 Canadian body horror film directed, edited, and produced by Jesse Thomas Cook and written by Tony Burgess. It stars Jason David Brown as a sewage worker who transforms into a hideous mutant after criminals trap him in a septic tank with the corpses they have hidden.

== Plot ==
Jack is a sewage worker who is asked to investigate a water contamination in his small hometown that has forced everyone else, including his pregnant wife Shelley, to evacuate. While checking out the local sewage plant, he falls into a septic tank, where he discovers numerous corpses. His screams for help are heard by local criminal Lord Auch and his brother Giant, who are responsible for the corpses and refuse to let Jack out as they cannot risk having their criminal activities uncovered. The toxic sewage eventually begins to transform Jack into a hideous mutant who calls himself Septic Man.

== Cast ==
- Jason David Brown as Jack / Septic Man
- Molly Dunsworth as Shelley
- Robert Maillet as Giant
- Tim Burd as Lord Auch
- Julian Richings as Phil Prosser
- Stephen McHattie as Mayor
- Nicole G. Leier as Woman
- Kirill Belousov as Soldier

== Reception ==
Septic Man premiered at the 2013 Austin Fantastic Fest, where Brown won "Best Actor" in the Horror Features category.

Ain't It Cool News and Dread Central both praised the film, the latter calling it a "bizarre yet inventive film" that would not be for everyone. Fangoria and Complex both gave negative reviews, with the latter writing that "it's a shame that Septic Man lacks the significance and social commentary of The Toxic Avenger, to which it's frequently compared, and settles for a straightforward plot to please fans of gag-inducing humor".

On Rotten Tomatoes, the film holds a critic approval rating of 12% based on 17 reviews, with an average rating of 3.9 out of 10; its viewer approval rating is 17% from over 100 reviews, with an average rating of 1.9 out of 5. On Metacritic, the film has a weighted average score of 8 out of 100 based on seven critics, indicating "overwhelming dislike"; its viewer rating is 3.1 out of 10 based on 15 reviews, indicating "generally unfavorable".
