= Pontypool Changes Everything =

1995 novel by Tony Burgess

- Author: Tony Burgess
- Language: English
- Genre: Psychological Horror Thriller
- Publication date: 1995
- Publication place: Canada
- Media type: Print
- Pages: 276

Pontypool Changes Everything is a horror novel by Tony Burgess, first published in 1995.

It was adapted into the 2008 film Pontypool with a screenplay by Burgess and was nominated for a Genie Award for the adaptation.

== Overview ==
A new kind of virus that spreads through the use of language appears in the small Ontario town of Pontypool. The plague, AMPS (Acquired Metastructural Pediculosis), causes people across Ontario to slip into aphasia and then into a cannibalistic zombie rage. AMPS is transferred through language and the only way to stop its spread is to outlaw communication. This metaphysical, deconstructionist virus requires a multi-disciplinary approach and doctors, semioticians, linguists, anthropologists, and even art critics present theories as to its source and treatment.
