= Jesse Thomas Cook =

Canadian director and producer

Jesse Thomas Cook is a Canadian director and producer of horror films. Based in Collingwood, Ontario, in 2018 he and his wife Liv Collins cofounded the Collingwood Film Co. to produce independent horror films in the Simcoe County region of Ontario, working with almost entirely local performers and artisans.

He has also been a partner with John Geddes and Matt Wiele in Foresight Features.

== Filmography ==
- Forlorn - 2006
- Scarce - 2008
- Monster Brawl - 2011
- Septic Man - 2013
- The Hexecutioners - 2015
- The Hoard - 2018
- Deadsight - 2018
- Cult Hero - 2022
- The Hyperborean - 2023
