= List of Vertical (film company) films =

Vertical (formerly Vertical Entertainment) is an American film distribution and production company.

== 2010s ==
Release date	Title	Notes
October 12, 2012	Least Among Saints	
April 25, 2013	The Last Keepers	
April 25, 2013	Rushlights	
June 12, 2013	The Hot Flashes	
August 23, 2013	Scenic Route	
October 11, 2013	The Snow Queen	
October 18, 2013	The Secret Village	
November 15, 2013	Freedom Force	co-distribution with Vision Films
January 17, 2014	G.B.F.	
February 28, 2014	Hair Brained	
March 28, 2014	Boys of Abu Ghraib	
June 6, 2014	Anna	
August 1, 2014	Behaving Badly	
February 3, 2015	Jurassic City	
February 27, 2015	Out of the Dark	
April 10, 2015	Dial a Prayer	
May 8, 2015	Playing It Cool	
May 8, 2015	Infini	
July 3, 2015	Robot Overlords	
July 31, 2015	Extinction	co-distribution with Stage 6 Films
October 9, 2015	The Final Girls	co-distribution with Stage 6 Films
December 18, 2015	He Never Died	
January 22, 2016	Terminus	
April 1, 2016	The Girl in the Photographs	
April 22, 2016	Holidays	co-distribution with XYZ Films
June 3, 2016	Approaching the Unknown	Theatrical distribution; distributed by Paramount Home Media Distribution on home media
July 8, 2016	Fathers and Daughters	
July 15, 2016	Undrafted	
August 5, 2016	The Remains	
August 12, 2016	Edge of Winter	
August 19, 2016	Kingsglaive: Final Fantasy XV	co-distribution with Stage 6 Films
August 26, 2016	Daylight's End	
September 9, 2016	Other People	
September 16, 2016	The Good Neighbor	
October 7, 2016	Under the Shadow	co-distribution with XYZ Films
October 21, 2016	Good Kids	
November 4, 2016	Trash Fire	co-distribution with Orion Pictures
December 16, 2016	The Hollow Point	
January 13, 2017	The Crash	
January 27, 2017	Get the Girl	co-distribution with Orion Pictures
February 10, 2017	Don't Hang Up	
March 3, 2017	Headshot	
March 17, 2017	Mean Dreams	
March 31, 2017	Here Alone	
April 7, 2017	Speech & Debate	
May 26, 2017	Berlin Syndrome	
July 28, 2017	Undercover Grandpa	
July 28, 2017	A Family Man	
September 1, 2017	Fallen	
September 1, 2017	The Layover	
September 15, 2017	The Wilde Wedding	
September 22, 2017	Happy Hunting	
October 13, 2017	The Secret Scripture	
October 27, 2017	Crash Pad	co-distribution with Destination Films
November 3, 2017	LBJ	co-distribution with Electric Entertainment
November 17, 2017	Revolt	
December 1, 2017	Slumber	
December 8, 2017	November Criminals	co-distribution with Stage 6 Films
December 15, 2017	Beyond Skyline	
December 22, 2017	Crooked House	co-distribution with Sony Pictures
January 5, 2018	The Strange Ones	
January 26, 2018	The Neighbor	
February 9, 2018	Golden Exits	
March 30, 2018	Status Update	
March 30, 2018	Birthmarked	
April 13, 2018	10x10	
May 25, 2018	In Darkness	
June 15, 2018	Gotti	
July 13, 2018	Shock and Awe	
July 20, 2018	Damascus Cover	
August 17, 2018	Billionaire Boys Club	
September 14, 2018	Where Hands Touch	
September 14, 2018	Patient Zero	
September 14, 2018	He's Out There	
September 28, 2018	Cruise	
October 5, 2018	A Crooked Somebody	
October 12, 2018	Look Away	
November 9, 2018	In a Relationship	
November 9, 2018	Pimp	
November 16, 2018	Welcome Home	
November 23, 2018	Astral	
December 14, 2018	Beyond White Space	
January 11, 2019	Ashes in the Snow	
January 18, 2019	The Brawler	
March 1, 2019	Giant Little Ones	
April 12, 2019	Boo!	
April 19, 2019	Drunk Parents	
May 10, 2019	The Professor and the Madman	
May 14, 2019	Chase	
May 24, 2019	Isabelle	
June 7, 2019	Katie Says Goodbye	
June 14, 2019	American Woman	co-distribution with Roadside Attractions
June 21, 2019	Burn Your Maps	
June 28, 2019	The Last Whistle	
July 12, 2019	Lying and Stealing	
July 26, 2019	See You Soon	
August 2, 2019	The Operative	
August 23, 2019	Jacob's Ladder	
September 13, 2019	Can You Keep a Secret?	
October 11, 2019	Polaroid	
October 15, 2019	Portal	
October 18, 2019	Miss Virginia	
November 8, 2019	Cold Brook	
November 12, 2019	By Dawn	
December 13, 2019	Code 8	

== 2020s ==
Release date	Title	Notes
January 10, 2020	The Dawn	
February 7, 2020	Waiting for Anya	
February 14, 2020	The Kindness of Strangers	
March 20, 2020	Human Capital	
May 12, 2020	Capone	co-distribution with Redbox Entertainment
May 22, 2020	Inheritance	
June 12, 2020	Infamous	
June 19, 2020	Miss Juneteenth	
June 26, 2020	Run with the Hunted	
July 10, 2020	Archive	
July 17, 2020	A Nice Girl Like You	
July 17, 2020	Ghosts of War	
July 24, 2020	Yes, God, Yes	
July 24, 2020	The Big Ugly	
August 14, 2020	The Bay of Silence	
August 21, 2020	The 24th	
August 21, 2020	Hard Kill	
September 1, 2020	Robin's Wish	
September 4, 2020	Critical Thinking	
September 18, 2020	No Escape	
September 25, 2020	Ava	
September 30, 2020	Then Came You	
October 30, 2020	The True Adventures of Wolfboy	
November 6, 2020	The Informer	
November 6, 2020	Jungleland	
November 6, 2020	Proxima	
November 13, 2020	Dreamland	
December 18, 2020	Skylines	
January 1, 2021	Shadow in the Cloud	co-distribution with Redbox Entertainment
January 15, 2021	American Skin	
January 22, 2021	Brothers by Blood	
January 22, 2021	Breaking Fast	
February 5, 2021	Son of the South	co-distribution with Clear Horizon Entertainment
February 10, 2021	Music	released in select IMAX theatres on February 10 for one night; released on demand February 12
February 19, 2021	Body Brokers	
February 26, 2021	Safer at Home	
March 12, 2021	Trust	
March 16, 2021	SAS: Red Notice	co-distribution with Redbox Entertainment
March 19, 2021	Phobias	
March 26, 2021	The Seventh Day	co-distribution with Redbox Entertainment
April 2, 2021	Every Breath You Take	
April 23, 2021	We Broke Up	
April 30, 2021	Four Good Days	
April 30, 2021	The Resort	
May 14, 2021	Georgetown	
May 21, 2021	Blast Beat	
May 28, 2021	American Traitor: The Trial of Axis Sally	co-distribution with Redbox Entertainment
June 4, 2021	Gully	
June 11, 2021	Akilla's Escape	distribution only; produced by Canesugar Filmworks
June 11, 2021	Rogue Hostage	co-distribution with Redbox Entertainment
June 18, 2021	Stalker	
June 25, 2021	Lansky	
July 2, 2021	The God Committee	
July 16, 2021	Out of Death	
July 30, 2021	Lorelei	
July 30, 2021	A Dark Foe	
August 6, 2021	Playing God	
August 13, 2021	About Us	
August 13, 2021	Buckley's Chance	
August 20, 2021	Collusions	
August 20, 2021	Risen	
August 27, 2021	Rushed	
September 3, 2021	Saving Paradise	
September 3, 2021	Wild Indian	
September 10, 2021	Small Engine Repair	
September 10, 2021	The Estate	
September 10, 2021	Forever First Love	
September 17, 2021	23 Walks	
September 17, 2021	Collection	
September 24, 2021	This Is the Year	
September 24, 2021	Solitary	
October 8, 2021	Vengeance Is Mine	
October 8, 2021	The Secret of Sinchanee	
October 15, 2021	The Grand Duke of Corsica	
October 15, 2021	The Blazing World	
October 29, 2021	Heart of Champions	
October 29, 2021	Daisy Quokka: World's Scariest Animal	
October 29, 2021	Broken Darkness	
November 5, 2021	Lantern's Lane	
November 5, 2021	Mark, Mary & Some Other People	
November 12, 2021	Soulmate(s)	
November 19, 2021	Alpha Rift	
November 26, 2021	Not to Forget	
November 26, 2021	Playing with Beethoven	
December 3, 2021	Twas the Night	
December 3, 2021	Death of a Telemarketer	
December 10, 2021	The Hating Game	
December 10, 2021	Horse Latitudes	
January 28, 2022	In the Forest	
February 18, 2022	A Fairy Tale After All	
March 4, 2022	A Day to Die	
March 11, 2022	Outsiders	aka No Running
March 18, 2022	The Hater	
March 18, 2022	Measure of Revenge	
March 25, 2022	Topside	
April 15, 2022	To Olivia	US distribution only
April 15, 2022	Room 203	
April 22, 2022	Unplugging	
May 3, 2022	Black Site	
May 6, 2022	Suicide for Beginners	
May 6, 2022	Little Sorcerer	aka Cinderella and the Secret Prince
May 13, 2022	Shark Bait	
May 13, 2022	Tankhouse	
May 17, 2022	Vendetta	co-distribution with Redbox Entertainment
June 3, 2022	Last Seen Alive	
June 3, 2022	The Overnight	
June 10, 2022	The Walk	
June 10, 2022	Wyrm	
June 17, 2022	Abandoned	
June 17, 2022	First Love	
June 17, 2022	The Lost Girls	
July 1, 2022	Last the Night	originally titled Pacerville
July 1, 2022	The Forgiven	North American co-distribution with Roadside Attractions only; distributed by Universal Pictures internationally
July 8, 2022	The Road to Galena	
July 15, 2022	Wrong Place	
July 15, 2022	Gone in the Night	
July 22, 2022	Alone Together	
August 5, 2022	Collide	
August 12, 2022	Emily the Criminal	North American co-distribution with Roadside Attractions only; distributed by Universal Pictures internationally
August 12, 2022	No Way Out	
August 26, 2022	Adopting Audrey	
September 16, 2022	Land of Dreams	
October 7, 2022	Sanctioning Evil	
February 3, 2023	Who Invited Charlie?	
March 3, 2023	The Donor Party	
March 24, 2023	The Tutor	
April 21, 2023	To Catch a Killer	
June 23, 2023	Wonderwell	
June 30, 2023	Prisoner's Daughter	
July 21, 2023	Natty Knocks	
July 28, 2023	Susie Searches	
August 11, 2023	Inside Man	
August 11, 2023	The Pod Generation	
August 11, 2023	Match Me If You Can	
August 18, 2023	Haunting of the Queen Mary	
September 1, 2023	The Good Mother	
September 1, 2023	All Fun and Games	
October 6, 2023	Miranda's Victim	
October 6, 2023	She Came to Me	
October 20, 2023	The Hard Hit	
November 3, 2023	Deadland	
December 8, 2023	Fast Charlie	
December 15, 2023	Breakwater	
January 5, 2024	The Bricklayer	
January 5, 2024	He Went That Way	
January 26, 2024	Cold Copy	
February 2, 2024	Somewhere Quiet	
February 9, 2024	Lola	
February 16, 2024	Bleeding Love	
February 23, 2024	Firecracker	
February 23, 2024	Parallel	
March 8, 2024	American Dreamer	
March 15, 2024	Prey	co-production with Voltage Pictures, Lucky 13 Productions, The Barnum Picture Company and Greenlight Pictures
March 29, 2024	Asphalt City	U.S. co-distribution with Roadside Attractions
March 29, 2024	The Listener	
April 5, 2024	Parachute	
April 12, 2024	The Absence of Eden	U.S. co-distribution with Roadside Attractions
April 19, 2024	Refuge	
April 26, 2024	Bloodline Killer	
May 2, 2024	Jeanne du Barry	Limited theatrical release on September 29, 2023
May 3, 2024	Chief of Station	
May 10, 2024	Lazareth	
May 10, 2024	Poolman	
May 17, 2024	The American	
June 7, 2024	Late Bloomers	
June 7, 2024	Life After Fighting	
June 14, 2024	Firebrand	U.S. co-distribution with Roadside Attractions
June 14, 2024	Reverse the Curse	
June 21, 2024	The Exorcism	
June 21, 2024	The Speedway Murders	
June 28, 2024	A Sacrifice	
July 5, 2024	Dead Whisper	
July 12, 2024	The Inheritance	
July 19, 2024	Clawfoot	
July 19, 2024	Widow Clicquot	
July 26, 2024	Dead Sea	
August 9, 2024	Girl You Know It's True	
August 23, 2024	Catching Dust	
September 6, 2024	A New York Story	
September 13, 2024	Winner	
September 27, 2024	Lee	U.S. co-distribution with Roadside Attractions
October 11, 2024	Bad Genius	
October 18, 2024	Bookworm	
October 25, 2024	Your Monster	
November 8, 2024	Elevation	
December 6, 2024	The Order	
January 3, 2025	The Damned	
January 10, 2025	Turn Me On	
February 7, 2025	Jazzy	
February 14, 2025	The Long Game	
February 21, 2025	The Bayou	
March 7, 2025	In the Lost Lands	
March 7, 2025	The Lost Daughter	
March 7, 2025	The Wild	
March 14, 2025	The World Will Tremble	
April 11, 2025	Home Sweet Home Rebirth	
April 11, 2025	Sacramento	
April 25, 2025	California King	
May 9, 2025	Fight or Flight	
May 9, 2025	Sharp Corner	
May 16, 2025	Here Now	
May 23, 2025	The New Boy	
May 23, 2025	The Protector	
May 30, 2025	The Crucifix: Blood of the Exorcist	
June 6, 2025	I Don't Understand You	
June 6, 2025	F+	
June 13, 2025	The Dogs	
June 20, 2025	Eye for an Eye	
June 20, 2025	Found Footage: The Making of the Patterson Project	
June 27, 2025	Ice Road: Vengeance	
June 27, 2025	Nobu	
July 1, 2025	The Twin	
July 18, 2025	Guns Up	
July 25, 2025	Osiris	
August 8, 2025	My Mother's Wedding	
August 22, 2025	Eden	
August 29, 2025	Griffin in Summer	
September 5, 2025	Bad Man	
September 5, 2025	The Threesome	
September 12, 2025	Motherland	
September 26, 2025	Dead of Winter	
September 26, 2025	Breed of Greed	
October 17, 2025	The Astronaut	
October 24, 2025	Last Days	
October 31, 2025	Safe House	
October 31, 2025	Messy	
November 7, 2025	All That We Love	
November 7, 2025	Modi	
November 7, 2025	Stone Cold Fox	
November 14, 2025	Bunny	
November 14, 2025	Bull Run	
November 28, 2025	Stone Creek Killer	
December 5, 2025	Rosemead	
December 12, 2025	Atropia	
December 12, 2025	Pose	
January 2, 2026	We Bury the Dead	
February 6, 2026	Dracula	
March 20, 2026	Tow	co-distribution with Roadside Attractions
March 20, 2026	The Cure	
April 10, 2026	Hamlet	
April 17, 2026	Brothers Under Fire	
April 17, 2026	The Whistler	
April 24, 2026	Desert Warrior	
May 8, 2026	Couples Weekend	
May 15, 2026	The Wizard of the Kremlin	
May 15, 2026	Driver's Ed	
May 22, 2026	Giant	
June 5, 2026	The Passenger	originally titled The Zealot
June 12, 2026	This Tempting Madness	
June 12, 2026	Time of Death	
June 26, 2026	Couture	
June 26, 2026	The Get Out	
July 28, 2026	The Gentleman Thief	
August 21, 2026	The Magic Faraway Tree	
August 28, 2026	Just Play Dead	
September 4, 2026	Come With Me	
September 18, 2026	The Weight	
October 16, 2026	Clean Hands	
October 23, 2026	Love Language	
November 20, 2026	Unbearable Christmas	Premiering first run window on Peacock

== Upcoming ==
Upcoming Vertical Entertainment films without release dates

Release date	Title	Notes
December 4, 2026	The Gallerist	co-distribution with Roadside Attractions
December 4, 2026	Games We Play	
January 1, 2027	Pendulum	
January 22, 2027	Lords of War	
March 26, 2027	The Saviors	
Spring 2027	Cliffhanger	
2027	Babies	co-distribution with Roadside Attractions
2027	Father Joe	
2027	The Last Resort	
2027	Recluse	
TBA	Hot Mess	
