= Summer job (disambiguation) =

Summer job can refer to employment within a seasonal industry that operates mainly or solely within the summer. It can also refer to:

== Entertainment ==
- The Summer Job, a 2014 horror novel by Adam Cesare
- Summer Job, a story in the comic series Optic Nerve (comics)
- Meatballs III: Summer Job, a 1986 film and the third installment in the Meatballs film series
- Odd Jobs, a 1986 film that is also known under the alternate title of Summer Jobs
- Summer Job, an episode from the seventh season of SpongeBob SquarePants

== Other uses ==
- The Summer Jobs + initiative created by the Office of Social Innovation and Civic Participation
- Mayor's Green Summer Job Corps, an environmental program launched by lawyer George S. Hawkins
