= Katie Douglas (actress) =

Canadian actress (born 1998)

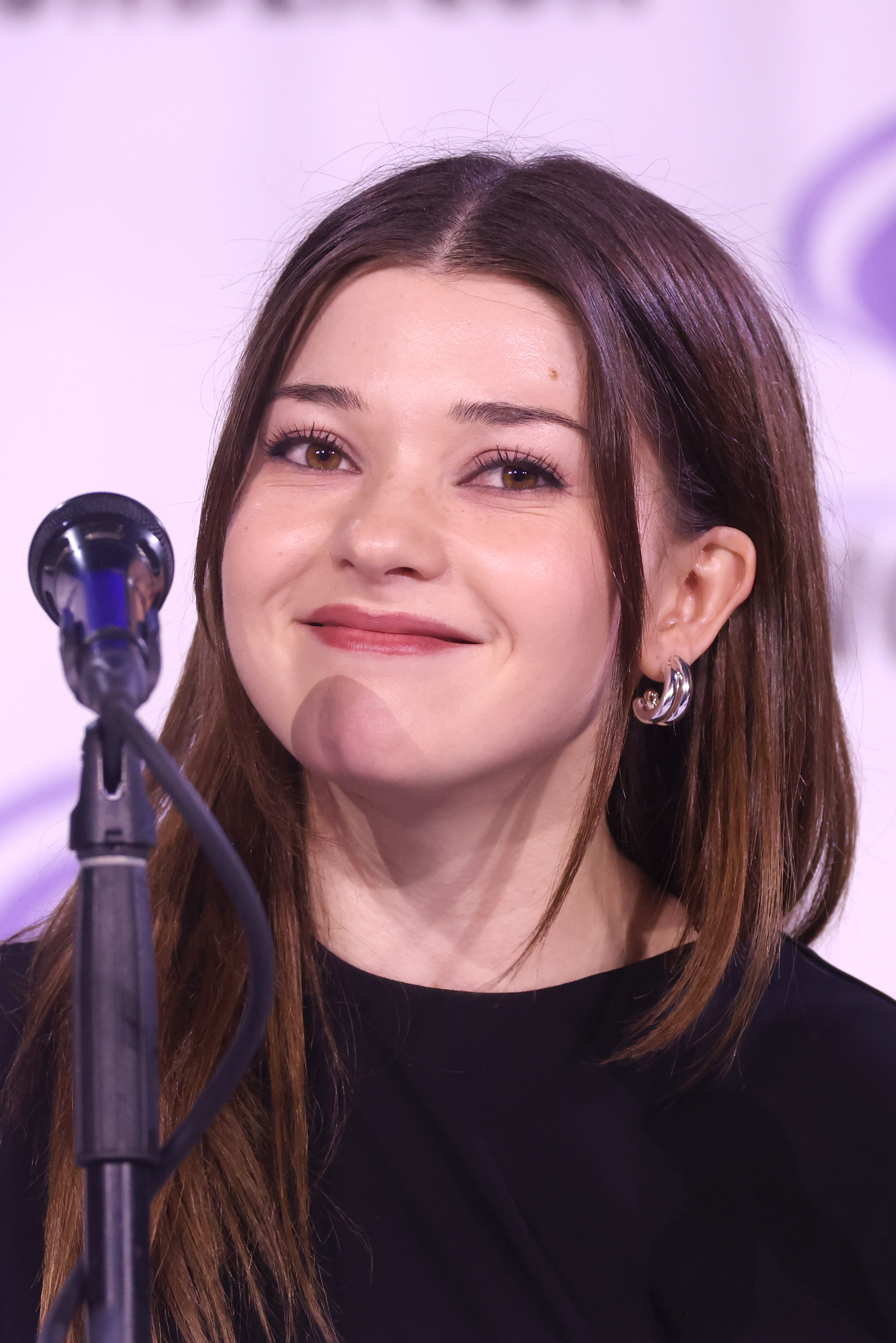
- Douglas in 2025
- Born: Kathryn Emily Douglas; October 19, 1998 (age 28); Burlington, Ontario, Canada
- Occupation: Actress
- Years active: 2007–present
- Height: 152 cm (5 ft 0 in)

Kathryn Emily Douglas (born October 19, 1998) is a Canadian actress. Her roles in horror and thriller projects with Shudder have gained her recognition as a modern day scream queen.

Douglas's career started in 2013 with roles in the television series Spooksville (2013–2014) and the film Compulsion (2013). Subsequent television roles included Defiance (2013–2015), Raising Expectations (2016–2018), Mary Kills People (2017–2019), and Pretty Hard Cases (2021–2023). After her first leading film role in the thriller Level 16 (2018), Douglas's breakthrough came with roles in the true crime television films Believe Me: The Abduction of Lisa McVey (2018) and The Girl Who Escaped: The Kara Robinson Story (2023); the latter won her the Canadian Screen Award.

Douglas gained wider recognition for her starring role as Abby in the Netflix comedy drama series Ginny & Georgia (2021–present). She has since acted in The Walk (2022), Lazareth (2024), and Clown in a Cornfield (2025).

== Early life and career ==
Douglas was born into a family with three siblings on October 19, 1998, in Burlington, Ontario, in Canada. Douglas started acting at the age of six at the Great Big Theatre Company in Burlington, Ontario. She starred in a number of productions, including a Christmas play involving penguins, and as Tinkerbell, at the summer camp of the Burlington Dance Academy. Douglas attended Nelson High School in Burlington. Throughout her early acting career, Douglas completed her education through the use of a travelling tutor.

== Career ==
Douglas began her screen acting career at the age of six in F2: Forensic Factor. Douglas later played Sally Wilcox on Discovery Family’s fantasy action TV show Spooksville in 2013, but it only lasted one season. Douglas starred as Young Irisa on the science fiction action TV series Defiance: The Lost Ones which premiered on SyFy in March 2014. At the age of 15, Douglas was nominated for Outstanding Performer in a Children’s Series at the 41st Daytime Creative Arts Emmy Awards held in Los Angeles in 2014, for her role as Sally Wilcox in Spooksville.

Douglas starred as Naomi Malik from 2017 to 2019 in the Global Network Canadian comedy and drama TV series Mary Kills People, working alongside Caroline Dhavernas. Douglas played a lead role as Vivien in Danishka Esterhazy's 2018 thriller film Level 16. For her work on Level 16, she won a Bloodie Award for Best Actress.

In 2019, Douglas was the protagonist in the drama film Believe Me: The Abduction of Lisa McVey, which recounts the true story of Lisa McVey. McVey was 17 years old and suicidal in 1984 when she was abducted, and raped multiple times over 26 hours, by serial killer Bobby Joe Long, before talking her way to freedom. Douglas received an ACTRA Award nomination for her performance, eventually losing out to Amybeth McNulty.

In 2021, she starred as Abby, a friend of Ginny and part of the MANG group (Max, Abby, Norah and Ginny), in the Netflix comedy series Ginny and Georgia, alongside Brianne Howey, Antonia Gentry, Sara Waisglass, and Chelsea Clark. After the Season 2 release, Ginny & Georgia was the most-watched title from January to June 2023 on Netflix, with a combined 967.2M hours viewed between Seasons 1 and 2. In May 2023, the series was renewed for a third and fourth season, the former of which was released on June 5, 2025.

Douglas starred in a main role as 18-year-old Jackie Sullivan, in the first two seasons of the CBC Television female police comedy-drama television series Pretty Hard Cases from 2021 to 2022.

In 2022, Douglas stars as Kate Coughlin, in the Daniel Adams-directed police protection film The Walk, among a cast which includes Justin Chatwin, Terrence Howard and Malcolm McDowell.

In 2023, she was the titular role in the film The Girl Who Escaped: The Kara Robinson Story, which portrays the true story of how a 15 year-old girl survived the trauma of abduction, incarceration and sexual assault for over 18 hours until an opportunity to escape arose.

In 2024, Douglas starred in the thriller film by Alec Tibaldi titled Lazareth opposite Ashley Judd and Sarah Pidgeon, which was released on May 10, 2024. Her performance in the 2025 film adaptation of the 2020 horror novel Clown in a Cornfield was met with positive reviews, with a writer from Slashershack writing that she possesses "scream queen potential".

== Filmography ==
=== Film ===
Year	Title	Role	Notes
2013	Compulsion	Young Saffron	
2018	Level 16	Vivien	
2018	Every Day	Megan / A	
2022	The Walk	Kate Coughlin	
2024	Lazareth	Imogen	
2024	This Too Shall Pass	Misty	
2025	Clown in a Cornfield	Quinn Maybrook	

=== Television film ===
Year	Title	Role
2011	Stay with Me	Lucy
2012	Sunshine Sketches of a Little Town	Rose Leacock
2013	Defiance: The Lost Ones	Young Irisa
2018	Believe Me: The Abduction of Lisa McVey	Lisa McVey
2019	Thicker Than Water	Addie Decker
2023	The Girl Who Escaped: The Kara Robinson Story	Kara Robinson

=== Television series ===
Year	Title	Role	Notes
2007	F2: Forensic Factor	Brenda	Episode: "Dead Man's Hollow"
2009	Flashpoint	Jennifer Sabiston	Episode: "The Fortress"
2012	Less Than Kind	Brenda	3 episodes
2012	Alphas	Teenage Nina	Episode: "When Push Comes to Shove"
2013–2014	Spooksville	Sally Wilcox	Main role, 22 episodes
2014	Saving Hope	Tatum	Episode: "The Heartbreak Kid"
2013–2015	Defiance	Young Irisa / Irzu / Little Girl	Recurring role, 10 episodes
2015–2016	Max & Shred	Melanie	2 episodes
2016	Eyewitness	Bella Milonkovic	4 episodes
2016-2018	Raising Expectations	Connor Wayney	Main role, 26 episodes
2018	Creeped Out	Indigo	Episodes: "Side Show, Parts 1 & 2"
2018	Burden of Truth	Amanda Parson	2 episodes: "Witch Hunt", "Devil in the Desert"
2017–2019	Mary Kills People	Naomi Malik	Main role, 18 episode
2020	Nurses	Sasha	Episode: "Lifeboat"
2021–2023	Pretty Hard Cases	Jackie Sullivan	Main role, 15 episodes
2021–present	Ginny & Georgia	Abby Littman	Main role, 30 episodes
2024	Ghosting with Luke Hutchie and Matthew Finlan	Herself	
2026	Sterling Point	Clem	Episode: "I'm Not a Shots Girl Either"

== Awards and nominations ==
Year	Award	Category	Nominated work	Result	Ref.
2014	41st Daytime Creative Arts Emmy Awards	Outstanding Performer in a Children’s Series	Spooksville	Nominated	
2014	35th Young Artist Awards	Best Performance – TV Series – Leading Young Actress	Spooksville	Nominated	
2018	Blood in the Snow Awards	Best Actress	Level 16	Won	
2019	17th Annual ACTRA Awards, Toronto	Outstanding Performance – Female	Believe Me: The Abduction of Lisa McVey	Nominated	
2020	Canadian Screen Awards, Toronto	Best Lead Performance, TV Movie	Believe Me: The Abduction of Lisa McVey	Nominated	
2021	Hollywood Blood Horror Festival	Best Young Actress	Double Edged	Won	
2021	Independent Horror Movie Awards	Best Actress	Double Edged	Won	
2022	IndieFEST Film Awards	Humanitarian Award of Excellence Actress: Leading	The Walk	Won	
2022	Rome International Movie Awards	Best Young Actress	The Walk	Won	
2022	Hollywood Reel Independent Film Festival	Best Supporting Actress	The Walk	Won	
2022	Moscow Indie Film Festival	Best Actress in Supporting Role	The Walk	Nominated	
2024	12th Canadian Screen Awards	Best Lead Performer, TV Movie	The Girl Who Escaped: The Kara Robinson Story	Won	
