= Clown in a Cornfield (film) =

2025 film by Eli Craig

- Theatrical release poster
- Directed by: Eli Craig
- Screenplay by: Carter Blanchard; Eli Craig
- Based on: Clown in a Cornfield by Adam Cesare
- Produced by: Wyck Godfrey; Marty Bowen; Isaac Klausner; John Fischer; Paris Kassidokostas-Latsis; Terry Dougas
- Starring: Katie Douglas; Aaron Abrams; Carson MacCormac; Kevin Durand; Will Sasso
- Cinematography: Brian Pearson
- Edited by: Sabrina Pitre
- Music by: Brandon Roberts; Marcus Trumpp
- Production companies: Temple Hill Entertainment; Rhea Films
- Distributed by: RLJE Films; Shudder
- Release dates: March 10, 2025 (SXSW); May 9, 2025 (U.S.)
- Running time: 96 minutes
- Country: United States
- Language: English
- Budget: $1 million
- Box office: $13.8 million

Clown in a Cornfield is a 2025 American slasher film directed by Eli Craig, who co-wrote the screenplay with Carter Blanchard. It is based on the 2020 novel by Adam Cesare, and stars Katie Douglas, Aaron Abrams, Carson MacCormac, Kevin Durand, and Will Sasso. The film follows a teenage girl (Douglas) who moves to a decaying Midwestern town, only to find herself and her new friends targeted by a murderous killer disguised as the local corporate clown mascot.

Clown in a Cornfield premiered at South by Southwest on March 10, 2025, followed by a theatrical release in the United States on May 9, 2025. The film received generally positive reviews from critics. In August 2026, a sequel was announced to be in production.

== Plot ==
In 1991, a group of teenagers in Kettle Springs, Missouri, party near the town's old Baypen Corn Syrup factory. Two teens sneak off into the nearby cornfield and are killed by Baypen's mascot, Frendo the Clown.

In the present, 17-year-old Quinn Maybrook relocates to Kettle Springs, where her father Glenn has taken a new job as the town's doctor. The Maybrooks' relationship is strained following the death of Quinn's mother, Samantha. Quinn befriends Cole—the son of Kettle Springs' mayor Arthur Hill—and his friends Janet, Matt, Ronnie, and Tucker. Cole also explains to Quinn the story of the burned-down Baypen factory, which the town blames on the group. While she overviews a horror parody video featuring Frendo, Quinn spots a second mysterious Frendo in the background. Meanwhile, Tucker is stalked outside his home by another Frendo, who secretly breaks in and kills him.

At the town's 100th Founder's Day festival, Matt accidentally causes a Frendo float to become fully engulfed, ruining the festivities. Kettle Springs' sheriff George Dunne accuses Quinn and her friends of sabotage and holds them in jail while Matt is decapitated by Frendo in his garage. That night, Quinn and Cole sneak off to a party at an isolated farmhouse. When one of the partygoers is killed with a crossbow, everybody flees in terror until Quinn's neighbor Rust Vance, also revealed to be Cole’s ex-boyfriend, shoots Frendo with his shotgun.

Several other Frendos suddenly emerge from the cornfield and pursue the group while Rust shoots another Frendo and severs his hand. The group takes shelter in a nearby shed, where Rust offers to stay behind to detonate a makeshift bomb and let the others escape through a sewer grate to find help. They reach a road and stumble upon Sheriff Dunne, who refuses to listen to them and arrests Cole for trespassing. Meanwhile, as Glenn searches for Quinn, he is forced to operate on the injured Frendo, while being held captive by another Frendo at knife-point. Glenn soon outwits his captor and fatally stabs him.

At the same time, the group is discovered by the Frendos in the cornfield, and Ronnie is ran through by one wielding a chainsaw. Quinn and Janet reach a neighbouring house where they find a rotary phone, but fail to work it. They are attacked by another Frendo, who impales Janet with a pitchfork. Quinn kills Frendo with the pitchfork but is captured by three other Frendos waiting outside. She awakens inside the Baypen factory surrounded by the Frendos, who take off their masks and reveal themselves as Mayor Hill, Sheriff Dunne, high school teacher Mr. Vern, shopkeeper Otis, and diner waitress Trudy. They blame the teens for the town's troubles and ruining its public image. Mayor Hill also reveals himself as the Baypen factory's arsonist and plans to kill both Quinn and Cole as a staged murder-suicide.

Just as Sheriff Dunne is about to kill Quinn, Glenn drives his car through a wall, causing Otis's head to be crushed by a steel beam and Trudy to be impaled on a pipe while Quinn flees. Sheriff Dunne chases her to a room full of Frendo costumes. Quinn disguises herself as one and electrocutes Sheriff Dunne with a cattle prod in his mouth. Mayor Hill escapes while Rust shows up and saves Cole, and they kiss. As they are leaving the factory, Quinn runs over Mr. Vern, killing him. One year later, Glenn is running for mayor, and Quinn is leaving for college. Cole and Rust show up to see her off. On the drive, she finds a Baypen music box in her back seat, which she throws out the window. Soon after, the music box pops open.

== Cast ==
- Katie Douglas as Quinn
- Aaron Abrams as Dr. Glenn Maybrook, Quinn's doctor father
- Carson MacCormac as Cole, the son of Arthur Hill
- Vincent Muller as Rust, Quinn's neighbor
- Kevin Durand as Arthur Hill, the mayor of Kettle Springs
- Dylan McEwan as Tyler Anderson
- Will Sasso as Sheriff Dunne of Kettle Springs
- Cassandra Potenza as Janet
- Verity Marks as Ronnie
- Ayo Solanke as Tucker
- Alexandre Martin Deakin as Matt

== Production ==
Plans to adapt Adam Cesare's Clown in a Cornfield were announced in 2020, prior to the novel's August release. The rights were purchased by Temple Hill Entertainment, with plans to turn the novel into a feature film. Eli Craig directed the script written by Carter Blanchard. The primary filming location was in Winnipeg from September 18 to October 23, 2023. The movie also filmed scenes in Stonewall, Manitoba. The movie was created by a full Canadian cast and crew.

=== Music ===
The film soundtrack "covers everything from 1980s hip-hop to modern electronica".

No.	Title	Artist	Length
1.	"What Do I Owe"	Dummy
2.	"I Ain't No Joke"	Eric B. & Rakim
3.	"Get Out The Way"	Mother Mother
4.	"If I Look Fine"	Roet
5.	"Bye Bye"	Haiku Hands & Ribongia
6.	"A Thousand Little Fires (feat. Definitely Dean)"	Anthony Lazaro
7.	"Not About You"	Haiku Hands
8.	"How U Feelin"	Kabwasa
9.	"Wicked and Weird"	Buck 65
10.	"Heavyweight"	Ruckspin & Lynxegirl
11.	"The Force"	Nicholas Hill, Glenn Herweijer, & Ben Sumner
12.	"Keep It Up"	Good Neighbours
13.	"Won't Take Me Alive"	Dirty Honey

== Release ==
Clown in a Cornfield premiered at the 2025 South by Southwest Film & TV Festival on March 10. The film was released by RLJE Films and Shudder on May 9, 2025, in the United States. The official theatrical release was preceded by exclusive screenings on May 2 and 3 at the West Wind, Four Brothers, and Galaxy theater chains.

Entertainment Film Distributors acquired the distribution rights of the film for U.K. release, Constantin Film for Germany and Switzerland, SND for France, Belga Films for Benelux, Elevation Pictures for Canada, StudioCanal for Australia and New Zealand, M2 Films for Eastern Europe, NOS Audiovisuais, for Portugal, ACME for Baltics, Tohokushinsha Film for Japan and Stage 6 Films for all other international markets.

== Reception ==
=== Box office ===
The film made $3.7 million from 2,277 theaters in its opening weekend, finishing fifth at the box office.

The film set a new opening weekend record for IFC, surpassing the opening weekend of Late Night with the Devil, which grossed $2.8 million a year earlier.

=== Critical response ===
On the review aggregator website Rotten Tomatoes, 74% of 156 critics' reviews are positive, with an average rating of 6.3/10. The website's consensus reads: "Clown in a Cornfield doesn't reinvent the corn-maze, but its clever insights, subversion of expectations, and solid foundation slashes its way to the top." Metacritic, which uses a weighted average, assigned the film a score of 55 out of 100, based on 15 critics, indicating "mixed or average" reviews. Audiences polled by CinemaScore gave the film an average grade of "C+" on an A+ to F scale, while 44% of those surveyed by PostTrak said they would definitely recommend it.

Brian Tallerico of RogerEbert.com gave the film 2.5 out of 4 stars and wrote, "I found Craig's film much more interesting when it was just allowed to be chaotic instead of when it was explaining the chaos." Meagan Navarro of Bloody Disgusting gave the film a rating of 3 out of 5 and wrote, "Tucker and Dale vs. Evil director Eli Craig tackles the mostly faithful adaptation with aplomb, bringing the right balance of gore and comedy for a zippy, lean slasher." In his review for Exclaim!, Wesley McLean rated the movie a 7/10, citing its mixture of traditional slasher elements with an attempted "subversion of the genre," adding that its strengths come when it "branches off into fun and novel ideas." Jake Wilson of The Sydney Morning Herald gave it 2.5 stars out of 5, writing, "There’s nothing wrong with using a teen horror movie to comment on the generation gap, class relations and the decline of the US manufacturing sector. But it helps if the plot isn’t so cluttered with half-realised ideas that the climax winds up being cluttered further with long speeches explaining what the message was meant to be. It’s a shame because Craig is a talented filmmaker, with a knack for discreetly stylish tracking shots and jolting edits and for working with actors to develop characters that undercut genre stereotypes."

Owen Gleiberman of Variety gave the film a negative review and wrote, "The film, in its trivial way, exudes a dyspeptic downer vibe, the result of everyone in it being so testy and unpleasant." Benjamin Lee, reviewing for The Guardian, gave the movie two stars out of five, praising the "neat and genuinely surprising queer twist" but describing Frendo as "just some clown, never given all that much to separate him from the many other horror clowns we know better" and the other characters as "weakly etched and indistinguishable". He summarizes the movie as "pretty standard late night fodder". Kevin Maher of The Times gave it one out of five stars, writing, "The characters are mostly loathsome and simply reduced to treading narrative water before the inevitable decapitation. Quinn is tiresome and clueless, while the final big reveal of the all-consuming murder motivation makes little sense. It’s like, I dunno, an awful Eighties slasher movie."

=== Accolades ===
Awards and nominations received by Clown in a Cornfield
Award	Year	Category	Nominee(s)	Result	Ref.
GLAAD Media Awards	2026	Outstanding Film – Wide Release	Clown in a Cornfield	Nominated	
