= Shock Totem =

American small-press publisher

- Shock Totem #10, artwork by Mikio Murakami
- Editor: K. Allen Wood
- Categories: Literature
- Frequency: Bi-annual
- Publisher: Shock Totem Publications, LLC.
- First issue: July 2009
- Country: United States
- Based in: Seattle, Washington
- Language: English
- Website: Archived at web.archive.org/web/20191222073833/http://www.shocktotem.com/
- ISSN: 1944-110X

Shock Totem Publications (commonly referred to as Shock Totem) was an American small-press publisher specializing in dark fantasy and horror.

== Shock Totem magazine ==
The debut issue of Shock Totem: Curious Tales of the Macabre and Twisted, a digest-sized magazine of fiction and nonfiction, was first published in July 2009. To date, eleven issues have been released, as well as three special holiday issues (Christmas 2011, Valentine's Day 2014, and Halloween 2014). Notable authors to appear in Shock Totem are Jack Ketchum, John Skipp, Kevin J. Anderson, William F. Nolan, Don D'Ammassa, David Niall Wilson, Kurt Newton, Rennie Sparks (of The Handsome Family), Darrell Schweitzer, Cody Goodfellow, Brian Hodge, Jeremy Wagner (of Broken Hope), John Dixon, Tim Waggoner, Violet LeVoit, Weston Ochse, Ari Marmell, Lee Thomas, John Langan, Stephen Graham Jones, Josh Malerman.

On January 1, 2015, it was announced that Shock Totem magazine would be going on hiatus until at least 2016. That hiatus lasted longer than expected, but on October 31, 2018, Shock Totem announced its return with a new issue, its eleventh, of Shock Totem magazine.

== Novels, collections, etc. ==
In addition to its namesake magazine, Shock Totem entered into book publishing in 2012 and published the following books:

- The Wicked, by James Newman (2012)
- Beautiful Sorrows, by Mercedes M. Yardley (2012)
- Ugly As Sin, by James Newman (2013)
- Dominoes, by John Boden (2013)
- Zero Lives Remaining, by Adam Cesare (2015)
- Shine Your Light on Me, Lee Thompson (2016)
- Greener Pastures, by Michael Wehunt (2016)

In early 2017, citing personal reasons (kids, exhaustion, and ultimately a type-2 diabetes diagnosis), publisher K. Allen Wood dissolved the Shock Totem book line, transferring all current and in-progress books to Jason Sizemore and Apex Publications, save for Zero Lives Remaining, by Adam Cesare, who decided to self-publish it under his own Black T-shirt Books.

== Editorial staff ==
- K. Allen Wood
- John Boden
- Mercedes M. Yardley
- Sarah Wood
- Chad Lutzke
- Tom Moran
- Billie Moran

== Former staff ==
- Michelle Howarth
- Chris Vrysen
- Nick Contor
- Tom Bordonaro
- Mercedes M. Yardley
- Zachary C. Parker
- Barry Dejasu
- Catherine Grant

== History ==
Shock Totem Publications, LLC was founded in 2008 by K. Allen Wood. Originally meant to be a monthly e-zine, the decision was made to publish a bi-annual print digest in early 2009. In late 2011, Shock Totem came full circle and entered the digital realm by making available each issue as e-books. In 2012, they published their first novel and single-author collection.

In May 2020, Shock Totem Publications closed its doors for good.

== Notes and references ==
1. Shock Totem: Curious Tales of the Macabre and Twisted #1 Bookgasm, September 2009
2. Shock Totem #1 Horrorworld, September 2009
3. Shock Totem - Review Hellnotes, August 2009
4. Hellfire Right Out of the Gate: Shock Totem’s First Issue Brain Tremors, August 2009
5. Shock Totem 1: Curious Tales of the Macabre and Twisted - Summer 2009 The Future Fire, July 2009
6. Interview with Editor/Publisher K. Allen Wood D.L. Snell’s Market Scoops, October 2009
7. Interview with Editor/Publisher K. Allen Wood Duotrope's Digest Editor Interview, June 2010
8. Review: Shock Totem #2 The Journal of Always, August 2010
9. Magazine Review: Shock Totem Issue #3 Fatally Yours, March 2011
10. Reviewed: Shock Totem Issue 3 The Crow's Caw, March 2011
11. Creating a Monster: Interview with Shock Totem Editor/Creator K. Allen Wood Toasted Cheese Interview, May 2011
12. Shock Totem 6 (Book Review) Fangoria, April 2013
13. Storyville: Editor Interviews—Shock Totem, Shimmer, and The Dark LitReactor: Storyville, December 2013
14. KnippKnopp Interviews...Shock Totem Publications KnippKnopp, February 2014
15. Dominoes - Book Review Hellnotes, March 2014
16. Dominoes Wins a DRAWA Written Backwards, April 2014
17. Trailer for Zero Lives Remaining Reel Splatter Productions, November 2015
18. The Year in Horror, 2015: 13 Frighteningly Good Reads Fangoria, January 2016
