= Asher Angel =

American actor (born 2002)

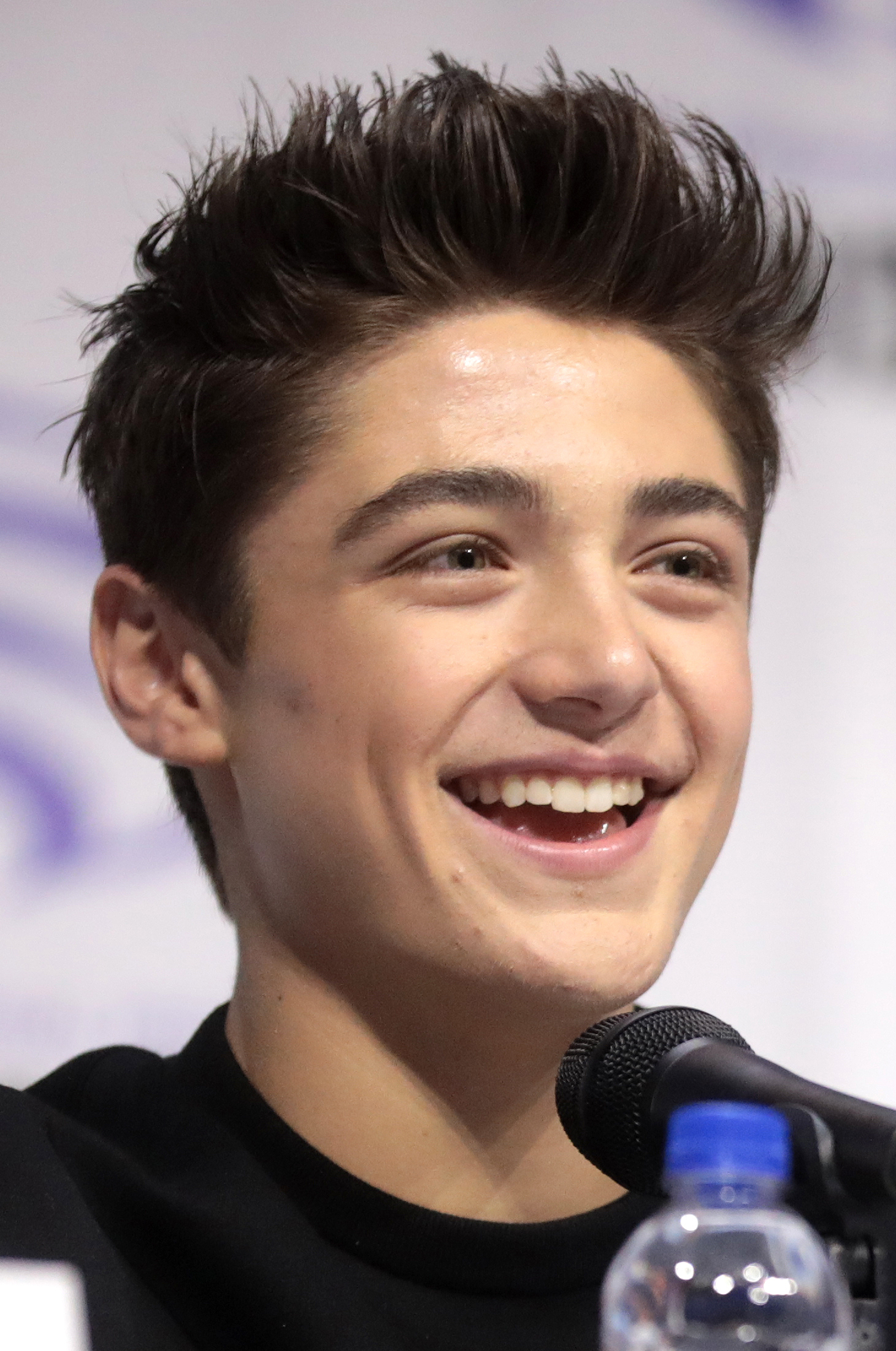
- Angel in 2019
- Born: Asher Dov Angel; September 6, 2002 (age 23); Phoenix, Arizona, U.S.
- Occupation: Actor
- Years active: 2008–present

Asher Dov Angel (born September 6, 2002) is an American actor. He began his career as a child actor in the film Jolene (2008), starring Jessica Chastain. He is known for his roles as Jonah Beck in the Disney Channel series Andi Mack (2017–2019) and Billy Batson in the DC Extended Universe films Shazam! (2019) and Shazam! Fury of the Gods (2023).

== Early and personal life ==
Angel was born Asher Dov Angel in Phoenix, Arizona, and lived in Paradise Valley, Arizona. His parents are Jody and Coco Angel, and he is the oldest of three siblings, with a brother and sister. He is Jewish. He sings and plays the guitar.

== Career ==
At the age of 5, Angel appeared in the 2008 film Jolene. Angel started his career by appearing in numerous theater productions. At the age of 7, Desert Stages Theatre held auditions for the musical Oliver! and, with his parents' permission, Angel auditioned and won a role in the production. His mother promised to take him to Los Angeles if he "put in the work and [did] 30 [local] shows", and he went on to act in multiple plays including The Little Mermaid, Seussical, Mary Poppins, and Into the Woods at the Desert Stages Theatre in Scottsdale. His mother kept her promise, and Angel traveled to Los Angeles where, at age 12, he auditioned for and won the part of Jonah Beck in the Disney Channel television series Andi Mack. His whole family moved to Utah to accommodate filming for the series.

In April 2019, Angel played the lead role of Billy Batson, with Zachary Levi starring as his adult superhero alter ego, in the film adaptation of DC Comics' Shazam! The film, a further installment of the DC Extended Universe, was released to critical acclaim. Angel released his debut single "One Thought Away", featuring Wiz Khalifa, in 2019. He reprised his role of Billy Batson in Shazam! Fury of the Gods, which was released on March 17, 2023.

In February 2022, Angel joined the cast of Hulu's Darby and the Dead. In May 2023, it was announced that Angel had been cast in the thriller movie Lazareth as well as the teen romance 99 Days. He starred in the movie On Fire, which was released in select theaters in late 2023. He released the single "Flip the Switch" in January 2024.

In July 2025, he joined the cast of the Tubi romantic comedy film Kissing Is the Easy Part.

== Filmography ==
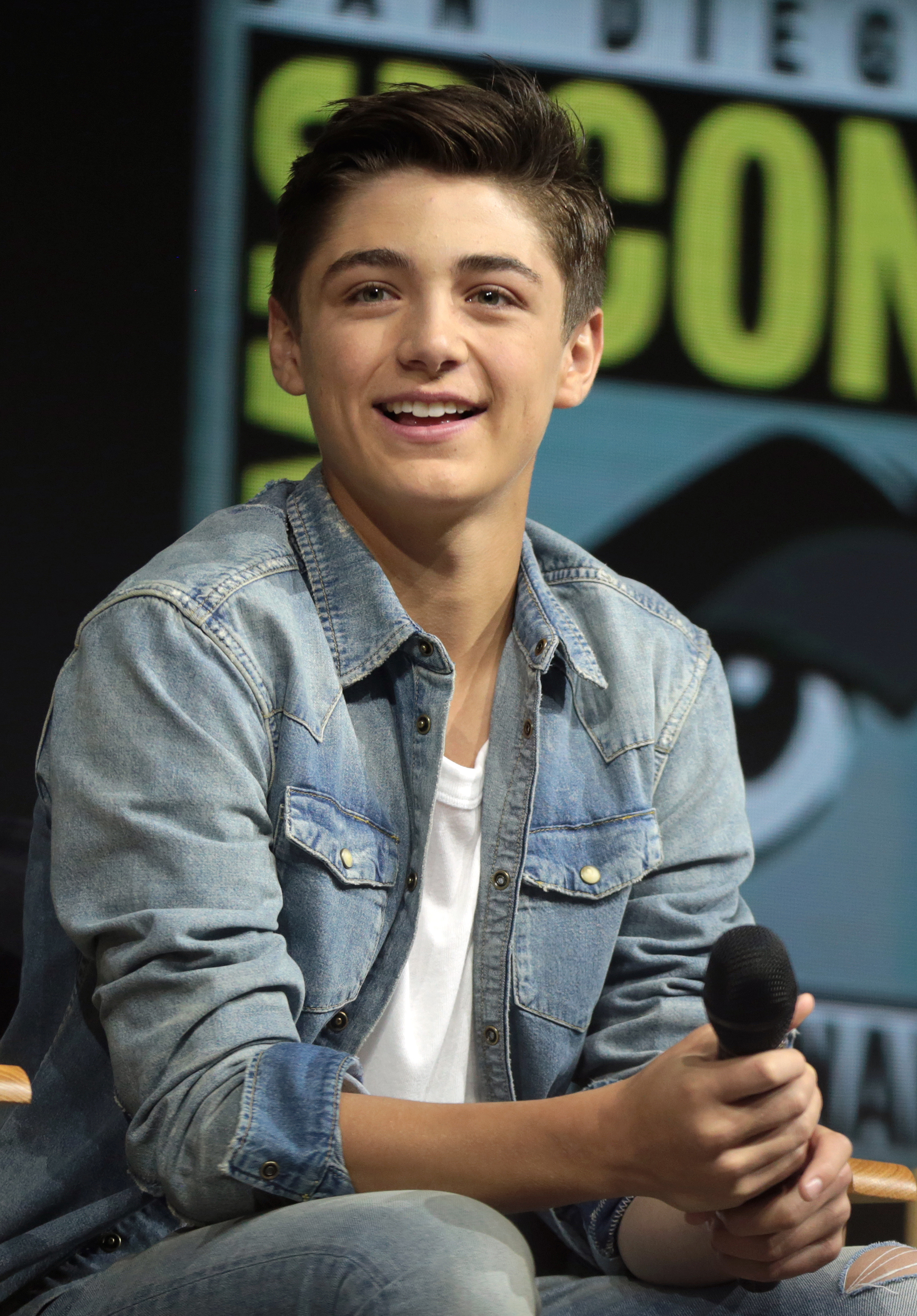
Angel at the 2018 San Diego Comic-Con

Key
†	Denotes films that have not yet been released

=== Film ===
Year	Title	Role	Notes
2008	Jolene	5-year-old Brad Jr.	
2018	On Pointe	Alex	Also known as Driven to Dance
2019	Shazam!	Billy Batson	
2022	Darby and the Dead	James	
2023	Shazam! Fury of the Gods	Billy Batson	
2023	On Fire	Clay Laughlin	
2024	Lazareth	Owen	
2026	Kissing Is the Easy Part	Sean	

=== Television ===
Year	Title	Role	Notes
2016	Nicky, Ricky, Dicky & Dawn	Jasper	Episode: "Ballet and the Beasts"
2016	Criminal Minds: Beyond Borders	Ryan Wolf	Episode: "De Los Inocentes"
2017–2019	Andi Mack	Jonah Beck	Main role
2020	All That	Himself	Episode: 1117
2020	The Substitute	Himself	Episode: "Asher Angel"
2020	Group Chat	Himself	Episode: "Dance Dance Fart"
2020	Nickelodeon's Unfiltered	Himself	Episode: "Zombies Eat Unicorns!"
2021	High School Musical: The Musical: The Series	Jack	Episode: "Spring Break"

== Awards and nominations ==
Year	Award	Category	Nominated work	Result	Ref.
2019	Saturn Awards	Best Performance by a Younger Actor	Shazam!	Nominated	
2019	Young Entertainer Awards	Best Young Ensemble in a Television Series	Andi Mack	Won	
2020	iHeartRadio Music Awards	Social Star Award	—	Won	
