= Rossif Sutherland =

Canadian actor (born 1978)

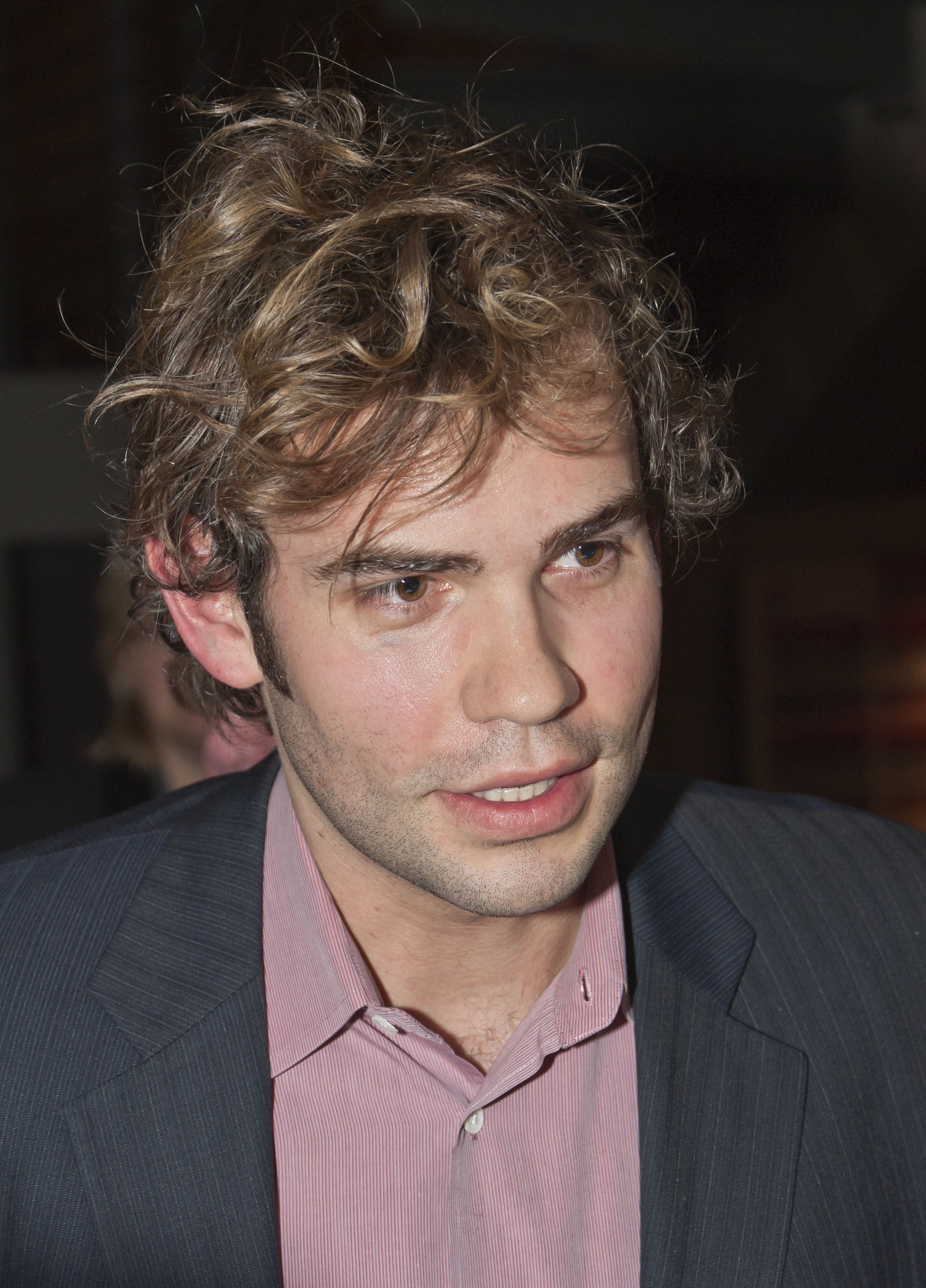
- Sutherland in 2009
- Born: Rossif Racette-Sutherland; September 25, 1978 (age 48); Vancouver, British Columbia, Canada
- Education: Princeton University
- Occupation: Actor
- Years active: 2003–present
- Spouse: Celina Sinden (m. 2016)
- Children: 1
- Parents: Donald Sutherland (father); Francine Racette (mother)
- Relatives: Angus Sutherland (brother); Kiefer Sutherland (half-brother); Rachel Sutherland (half-sister); Sarah Sutherland (half-niece)

Rossif Racette-Sutherland (/rɒsɪf/; born September 25, 1978) is a Canadian actor. He has appeared in various projects including TV series like ER and Crossing Lines and films such as Poor Boy's Game and River. By fall 2024, Sutherland had starred in the Canadian-produced drama Murder in a Small Town based on the "Alberg and Cassandra Mysteries" crime fiction series by L. R. Wright. Sutherland has also been part of films such as Hyena Road, and Guest of Honour and TV series such as King, Reign, and Copper.

== Early life and education ==
Sutherland was born in Vancouver but lived in Paris from age seven. He is the second son of Canadian actors Donald Sutherland and Francine Racette, the brother of actor Angus Sutherland and Roeg Sutherland, and the paternal half-brother of actor Kiefer Sutherland and his twin sister Rachel Sutherland. He was named after director Frédéric Rossif. He studied philosophy at Princeton University.

== Career ==
Rossif Sutherland has appeared in films, Timeline (as François Dontelle), and Red Doors (as Alex). He had a recurring role on the television show ER during its tenth season. He had a small role in the TV series Monk in the episode "Mr. Monk and the Other Detective," as well as a guest appearance in several episodes of Season 5 of the TV series Covert Affairs.

Sutherland appeared in the movie Poor Boy's Game with Danny Glover and Flex Alexander and in the 2009 comedy/drama, High Life, with Timothy Olyphant, Russell Peters, and Greg Germann. He appeared with his father in the 2010 Comedy The Con Artist directed by Risa Bramon Garcia. In 2012, he joined the cast of the television show King. Beginning the next year, he appeared as Nostradamus on American historical fantasy television series Reign. In 2015, he starred in the indie films River and Hyena Road. For his role in River, he received a Canadian Screen Award nomination in 2016. In 2018, he worked in the Lifetime film Believe Me: The Abduction of Lisa McVey portraying Bobby Joe Long.

In 2023, Sutherland worked in the Lifetime film Bad Romance: The Vicky White Story as a part of its "Ripped from the Headlines" feature films; he portrayed Casey White in the film's depiction of the Casey White prison escape. He stars as Karl Alberg with Kristin Kreuk as Cassandra in the Canadian-produced psychological crime drama Murder in a Small Town; the show is based on the "Alberg and Cassandra Mysteries" series by L. R. Wright.

== Personal life ==
Sutherland married British actress and Reign co-star Celina Sinden in February 2016; they have one son. He speaks French.

== Filmography ==
=== Film ===
Year	Title	Role	Notes	Ref.
2003	Timeline	François Dontelle		
2005	Red Doors	Alex		
2006	I'm Reed Fish	Gabe		
2007	Poor Boy's Game	Donnie Rose		
2009	High Life	Billy		
2010	The Con Artist	Vince		
2010	Pour L'amour de Dieu	Jésus		
2011	I'm Yours	Robert		
2012	Dead Before Dawn	Burt Rumsfeld		
2014	Big Muddy	Tommy Valente		
2015	Hellions	Doctor Henry		
2015	Hyena Road	Warrant Officer Ryan Sanders		
2015	River	John Lake		
2016	Edge of Winter	Luc		
2017	Trench 11	Lt. Barton		
2018	Backstabbing for Beginners	Trevor		
2019	Guest of Honour	Mike		
2019	A Call to Spy	Dr. Chevain		
2020	Possessor	Michael Vos		
2021	The Middle Man	Steve Miller		
2021	The Retreat	Gavin		
2022	Orphan: First Kill	Allen Albright		
2022	Stellar	Bartender		
2025	Keeper	Malcolm		

=== Television ===
Year	Title	Role	Notes	Ref.
2003–2004	ER	Lester Kertzenstein	Recurring role, 11 episodes	
2005	Monk	Vic Blanchard	Episode: "Mr. Monk and The Other Detective"	
2011	Being Erica	Emmett	Episode: "Being Ethan"	
2011	Flashpoint	Charlie Alanak	Episode: "Team Player"	
2011	Living in Your Car	Sam	Episode: "Chapter 19"	
2012	King	Detective Pen Martin	Main role (season 2), 13 episodes	
2012	The Listener	Anthony Wallace	Episode: "The Bank Job"	
2012	An Officer and a Murderer	Detective Nick Gallagher	Television film	
2013	Crossing Lines	Moreau	3 episodes	
2013	Cracked	Timothy Lawton	Episode: "Hideaway"	
2013–2017	Reign	Nostradamus	Recurring role, 19 episodes	
2014	Unité 9	Jaïson	3 episodes	
2014	Covert Affairs	Tony Salgado	4 episodes	
2015	Haven	Henry/The Sandman	3 episodes	
2016	The Expanse	Neville Bosch	Episode: "Back to the Butcher"	
2018	Believe Me: The Abduction of Lisa McVey	Bobby Joe Long	Television film	
2022–2023	Paris Paris	Meursault	9 episodes	
2022	The Handmaid's Tale	Ezra Shaw	2 episodes	
2022	Three Pines	Jean-Guy Beauvoir	8 episodes	
2023	Essex County	Doug	4 episodes	
2023	Bad Romance: The Vicky White Story	Casey White	Television film	
2024	Plan B	Bryson	6 episodes	
2024–present	Murder in a Small Town	Karl Alberg	Main role	

== Awards and nominations ==
Year	Award	Category	Work	Result	Ref
2010	Genie Awards	Performance by an Actor in a Supporting Role	High Life	Nominated	
2013	ACTRA Toronto Awards	Outstanding Performance – Male	Flashpoint	Nominated	
2016	Canadian Screen Awards	Performance by an Actor in a Leading Role	River	Nominated	
2016	ACTRA Toronto Awards	Outstanding Performance – Male	Hyena Road	Nominated	
