= Raising Expectations =

Television series

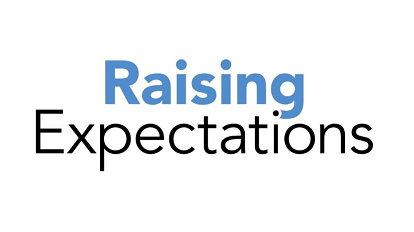
- Genre: Sitcom
- Created by: Tom Saunders
- Written by: Tia Ayers; Michael D'Ascenzo
- Starring: Jason Priestley; Molly Ringwald; Luke Bilyk; Matthew Tissi; Katie Douglas; Jake Sim; Simon Cadel
- Country of origin: Canada
- Original language: English
- No. of seasons: 2
- No. of episodes: 26

Production
- Executive producer: Tom Saunders
- Running time: 22 minutes
- Production companies: Aircraft Pictures; Dolphin Entertainment

Original release
- Network: Family Channel
- Release: May 8, 2016 – January 14, 2018

Raising Expectations (formerly known as The Wonderful Wayneys) is a Canadian television series, produced by Aircraft Pictures in conjunction with Dolphin Entertainment. The series stars Jason Priestley and Molly Ringwald as Wayne and Paige Wayney, the perfectionist parents of five teenage children of whom four are perennial overachievers, and Simon Cadel as Emmett, the one son who is constantly falling short of his parents' demanding expectations. The cast also includes Luke Bilyk, Katie Douglas, Jake Sim and Matthew Tissi. The series premiered on May 8, 2016 on Family Channel. Season 2 began airing on June 18, 2017.

== Cast ==
- Jason Priestley as Wayne Wayney
- Molly Ringwald as Paige Wayney
- Luke Bilyk as Adam Wayney
- Matthew Tissi as Bentley Wayney
- Katie Douglas as Conner Wayney
- Jake Sim as Derek Wayney
- Simon Cadel as Emmett Wayney

== Episodes ==
| Season | Episodes | Originally aired | |
| Season | Episodes | First aired | Last aired |
|---|---|---|---|
| 1 | 13 | May 8, 2016 | October 23, 2016 |
| 2 | 13 | June 18, 2017 | January 14, 2018 |

=== Season 1 (2016) ===
| No. overall | No. in season | Title | Directed by | Written by | Original release date |
|---|---|---|---|---|---|
| 1 | 1 | "Smells Like Victory" | Jason Priestley | Unknown | May 8, 2016 |
After being banned from the school's science fair, Emmett recruits Nate to enter a stink bomb disguised as a project. Derek is so confident he'll win the science fair, he asks his siblings to coach him in the art of acting humbly surprised.
| 2 | 2 | "Family Tree" | Warren P. Sonoda | Unknown | May 15, 2016 |
Wayne and Conner disagree about whether a tree in the front yard should be removed. Meanwhile, Adam and Bentley join forces to repair the air conditioner.
| 3 | 3 | "Dinner and a Ramp" | Christine Deacon | Unknown | May 22, 2016 |
Conner grows tired of her brothers interfering with her dating life, and Emmett's attempt to trade a date with her for a bike discount proves to be the last straw.
| 4 | 4 | "The Great Hot Dog Escape" | Shawn Alex Thompson | Josh Gal | May 29, 2016 |
Emmett will do anything to get to a local hot dog eating contest, even if it means disobeying Paige and tunneling through the basement wall to freedom. Adam and Bentley stumble upon a mysterious stash of chocolate-covered raisins.
| 5 | 5 | "Wayne's White Lie" | Shawn Alex Thompson | Dan Cummins | June 6, 2016 |
During an online lecture, Paige shares a heroic story from Wayne’s past that may or may not be true. The kids take on internet trolls attacking Wayne’s story, but start to question if the online community is right about their dad.
| 6 | 6 | "Family Business" | Christine Deacon | Unknown | June 12, 2016 |
Emmett enlists his siblings to help him manufacture t-‐shirts in the garage, but it turns out the logo Emmett was using violates a charity’s copyright. Now Emmett has to reimburse the charity, but he’s already spent the money.
| 7 | 7 | "The Sophisticates" | Brian Roberts | Unknown | June 19, 2016 |
Bentley’s club, “The Sophisticates,” is embroiled in a turf war with a rival club, “The Aficionados,” over ownership of the best library spot. To solve their problem “like gentlemen,” Bentley hosts a quip-off, which quickly devolves into an ill-mannered affair.
| 8 | 8 | "Lobsterro" | Jim Allodi | Unknown | June 26, 2016 |
Paige’s judgmental, animal-activist sister, Rebecca, comes for a surprise visit. Tired of being mocked for his simple dinners, Emmett attempts to cook lobster. Chaos ensues when the lobsters escape, and the kids convince themselves they are the subjects of lobster revenge.
| 9 | 9 | "Loser Show" | Jim Allodi | Unknown | July 3, 2016 |
Conner fusses over the International Honors Society dinner she is hosting at the Wayney House. Inspired by Conner's club, Emmett creates his own scholastic club for C-students and encourages members to T.P. an A-student's house, not realizing that the targeted house will be his own.
| 10 | 10 | "The Devil's Ottoman" | Adam Reid, Max Reid | Unknown | July 10, 2016 |
Paige thinks the Wayneys are too reliant on their electronic devices, so she leads them on a family camping trip to The Devil's Ottoman. Paige's plans for them to reconnect with each other and commune with nature are only half-successful.
| 11 | 11 | "The Telltale Doing" | Shawn Alex Thompson | Unknown | July 17, 2016 |
Bentley's audition for the all-city orchestra is in jeopardy when Emmett accidentally breaks his precious cello. Emmett and Nate stage a robbery to convince everyone it was stolen. Conner and Adam engage in a turf war over the use of their toiletries.
| 12 | 12 | "What's Growing in Emmet's Room" | Jesse Shamata | Unknown | July 24, 2016 |
When the stench coming from Emmett’s room is determined to be mold, the family calls a fumigator who claims he only needs to tent Emmett’s room. As the mold spreads to other bedrooms, the siblings are inconvenienced when they have to bunk together.
| 13 | 13 | "Poetry Commotion" | Jason Priestley | Unknown | July 31, 2016 |
Paige receives what she thinks is a love poem from a teacher, but Wayne disagrees. Things get so heated, the kids -‐ worried their parents might get a divorce -‐ intervene.

=== Season 2 (2017) ===
| No. overall | No. in season | Title | Directed by | Written by | Original release date |
|---|---|---|---|---|---|
| 14 | 1 | "Sorcery: The Summoning" | Melanie Orr | Unknown | June 18, 2017 |
Emmett “borrows” a rare gaming card from Derek, but is in trouble when a teacher confiscates it. The stakes are raised when Emmett discovers the same teacher using the card at a tournament and realizes he has to win it back.
| 15 | 2 | "Freak Out" | Stefan Brogren | Unknown | June 25, 2017 |
Paige is excited and worried about her upcoming interview with her favorite journalist. Conner and Adam vie for screen time during the interview, while Emmett goads Derek to freak out on camera.
| 16 | 3 | "Tyranny of the Jars" | Shawn Alex Thompson | Unknown | July 2, 2017 |
Emmett produces a “shockumentary” showcasing the “tyranny” of the intricate system of penalty jars for grammatical offenses. The family revolts and smashes the jars – only to devolve into a pun-‐filled world that makes them crave their previous life.
| 17 | 4 | "The Hawk and the Drone" | Brian Roberts | Unknown | July 9, 2017 |
Emmett’s plan to build a drone is put on hold so he can get Conner an awesome birthday present-‐-‐ a wild hawk. Paige tells Wayne to spend more quality time with Emmett, which translates into him resurrecting Emmett’s drone project.
| 18 | 5 | "The Nerds and the Bees" | Stefan Brogren | Unknown | July 23, 2017 |
Emmett has a crush on his math tutor, but she has a thing for Adam. To even the playing fields, Emmett uses underhanded tactics to make Adam less desirable. Bentley gets a new harp, but he can’t get it up the stairs. Conner and Paige try their hands at beekeeping.
| 19 | 6 | "Chez Bentley" | Jesse Shamata | Unknown | August 5, 2017 |
Paige heads off to visit Wayne, who’s away on business, but the kids’ plans for an exciting adult-‐free weekend are ruined when Bentley converts his parents’ bedroom into a “bed and breakfast” and welcomes in an adult stranger with a past.
| 20 | 7 | "Learner's Permit to Kill" | Jim Allodi | Unknown | October 22, 2017 |
Wayne, Paige, and Adam are fed up with chauffeuring Bentley. They insist he get his learner’s permit even though he is scared of driving. Emmett attempts to help. Bentley overcame his fear of driving while Derek and Conner feud over the ‘security threat’ of a visiting rabbit.
| 21 | 8 | "I Know What You Did Last Night" | Jim Allodi | Unknown | October 29, 2017 |
When Adam injures himself while sneaking in from a party late at night, Emmett covers for him and has to endure the consequences. Wayne is worried about Adam’s football career, and Bentley is jealous of all the attention he’s getting.
| 22 | 9 | "Choir! Choir! Pants on Fire!" | Melanie Orr | Unknown | November 5, 2017 |
Derek’s mysterious behavior leads his brothers to surmise he has a girlfriend, and they are shocked to discover he’s actually in a choir. Much to Derek’s chagrin, Bentley, Paige, and Emmett home in on their choir life. Conner gets her wisdom teeth removed.
| 23 | 10 | "The Haunter Becomes the Haunted" | Jim Allodi | Unknown | November 12, 2017 |
Emmett convinces his siblings to create a haunted house. Adam and Emmett procure a very realistic fake cadaver from the teaching hospital, but it turns out the fake cadaver isn’t so fake....
| 24 | 11 | "He Said She-Shed" | Jim Allodi | Unknown | November 19, 2017 |
The basement hockey tournament is cut short when Wayne enlists the kids to help him finish Paige’s anniversary gift, an outdoor she-‐shed. Things get complicated when Paige discovers she hates working in the she-‐shed but must hide it from Wayne.
| 25 | 12 | "The Frogmaster" | Warren P. Sonoda | Unknown | January 7, 2018 |
Wayne and Paige ban Emmett from playing video games, sending him into a downward spiral. Paige seeks Adam’s help to improve her hand/eye coordination, and Wayne reveals a secret about his past.
| 26 | 13 | "The Big Trip" | Jim Allodi | Unknown | January 14, 2018 |
Paige discovers it is no easy task to organize five children on a last-minute trip to Paris. Emmett can’t find his passport, Conner is scared of flying, Bentley and Adam disagree about packing and Derek gets locked in his “safe room”.
