= Clown in a Cornfield =

2020 novel by Adam Cesare

- Author: Adam Cesare
- Audio read by: Jesse Vilinsky
- Language: English
- Series: Clown in a Cornfield #1
- Genre: Young adult horror
- Set in: A small fictitious town in Missouri
- Publisher: HarperTeen
- Publication date: August 25, 2020
- Publication place: United States
- Media type: Print, ebook, audiobook
- Pages: 352 pp
- ISBN: 9780062854599 (hardcover 1st ed.)
- OCLC: 1190757134

Clown in a Cornfield is a 2020 horror novel by American author Adam Cesare and marks his first novel in the young adult genre. Released in August, film rights were optioned ahead of its publication.

It won the 2020 Bram Stoker Award for Best Young Adult Novel. A film adaptation, also titled Clown in a Cornfield, was released in 2025.

== Synopsis ==
The novel centers upon Quinn Maybrook, a teenage girl who is a senior in high school, and who has recently moved to the small factory town of Kettle Springs, Missouri, from Philadelphia after the tragic death of her mother, Samantha. Her father, Glenn, has been hired as the new town physician in the hopes that this will allow the two of them to heal. But Quinn is not looking forward to moving.

Kettle Springs has suffered financially since the closing of the Baypen Corn Syrup Factory and its subsequent burning due to arson by a local boy named Cole Hill. As a result, the town is at odds with itself and strict lines are drawn between the largely conservative adults and the teens, who are more interested in having fun and getting views on their YouTube channel.

Quinn manages to befriend Cole and his group of friends, including Queen Bee Janet, the ponytail-wearing Ronnie, her boyfriend Matt, and Tucker, after an incident during her first day in class. Their science teacher, Mr. Vern, sends them all to study hall, and they get to talking about their group and the town's eerie history.

During the study hall, Quinn is invited to attend the town's annual Founder's Day celebration, despite Mr. Vern banning them from the event. She is also invited to the subsequent party planned by Janet that is taking place in the nearby cornfield.

However, things take a turn for the worse when the town's mascot, Frendo the Clown, begins to kill the town's "wayward" youth one by one.

== Development ==
When writing the novel Cesare wanted to "do not so much a throwback slasher as an attempt at a modern slasher with modern themes."

== Release ==
Clown in a Cornfield was released in the United States in hardback and ebook format on August 25, 2020 through HarperTeen. An audiobook adaptation narrated by Jesse Vilinsky was released on the same day through HarperCollins.

== Reception ==
Clown in a Cornfield has been reviewed by outlets such as Locus and the Library Journal, the latter of which stated that "While this title is marketed to teens, adult readers familiar with the classic horror slasher movies of the 1980s and 1990s should find it appeals." Signal Horizon and Bad Feeling Magazine also reviewed the novel, both praising Cesare for his writing.

=== Awards ===
- Bram Stoker Award for Best Young Adult Novel (2020, won)

== Sequel ==
In 2021, Cesare announced that he had been working on a sequel to Clown in a Cornfield and that it would be released the following year on August 23, 2022. The book, entitled Clown in a Cornfield 2: Frendo Lives, sees Quinn attempting to move on with her life after the events of the first book. She is forced to endure deranged conspiracy theories about the massacre, the most major of which claims that it never happened in the first place. When she is attacked by someone in a clown costume at a party, Quinn must return home in order to face the past and discover what exactly is going on. An audiobook adaptation voiced by Jesse Vilinsky was published alongside print and eBook releases.

A third novel was confirmed by Cesare in January 2023. It was revealed the title would be Clown in a Cornfield 3: The Church of Frendo. It also won the Bram Stoker Award for Superior Achievement in a Young Adult Novel.

A fourth entry in the series, Clown in a Cornfield 4: Lights! Camera! Frendo! was released in August 2026.

== Adaptation ==
Plans to adapt Clown in a Cornfield into a movie were announced in 2020, prior to the novel's August release. The rights were optioned by Temple Hill Entertainment, which released a 2025 feature film scripted by Carter Blanchard and directed by Eli Craig. Marty Bowen and Wyck Godfrey served as producers. The film was well-received by critics as they formed a consensus that "Clown in a Cornfield doesn't reinvent the corn-maze, but its clever insights, subversion of expectations, and solid foundation help slash its way to the top", paralleling some positive reviews at Screenrant and The Guardian or points of contention from IGN and Variety.
