= Bram Stoker Award for Best Young Adult Novel =

Horror literary award

The Bram Stoker Award for Best Young Adult Novel is an award presented by the Horror Writers Association (HWA) for "superior achievement" in horror writing for young adult novels. The HWA defines the category as being "intended for the age group 14-21, with word length beginning at 40,000 words."

== Winners and nominees ==
Bram Stoker Award for Best Young Adult Novel
Year (Eligibility)	Recipient	Title	Result	Ref
2011	Nancy Holder	The Screaming Season	Winner	
2011	Jonathan Maberry	Dust and Decay	Winner	
2011	JG Faherty	Ghosts of Coronado Bay	Nominee	
2011	Daniel Kraus	Rotters	Nominee	
2011	Patrick Ness	A Monster Calls	Nominee	
2011	Kenneth Oppel	This Dark Endeavor: The Apprenticeship of Victor Frankenstein	Nominee	
2012	Jonathan Maberry	Flesh and Bone	Winner	
2012	Libba Bray	The Diviners	Nominee	
2012	Barry Lyga	I Hunt Killers	Nominee	
2012	Michael McCarty	I Kissed a Ghoul	Nominee	
2012	Maggie Stiefvater	The Raven Boys	Nominee	
2012	Jeff Strand	A Bad Day for Voodoo	Nominee	
2013	Joe McKinney	Dog Days	Winner	
2013	Patrick Freivald	Special Dead	Nominee	
2013	Kami Garcia	Unbreakable	Nominee	
2013	Geoffrey Girard	Project Cain	Nominee	
2013	Cat Winters	In the Shadow of Blackbirds	Nominee	
2014	John Dixon	Phoenix Island	Winner	
2014	Jake Bible	Intentional Haunting	Nominee	
2014	Kami Garcia	Unmarked	Nominee	
2014	Tonya Hurley	Passionaries	Nominee	
2014	Peter Adam Salomon	All Those Broken Angels	Nominee	
2015	John Dixon	Devil's Pocket	Winner	
2015	Jennifer Brozek	Never Let Me Sleep	Nominee	
2015	Michaelbrent Collings	The Ridealong	Nominee	
2015	Tonya Hurley	Hallowed	Nominee	
2015	Maureen Johnson	The Shadow Cabinet	Nominee	
2015	Ian Welke	End Times at Ridgemont High	Nominee	
2016	Maria Alexander	Snowed	Winner	
2016	Jennifer Brozek	Last Days of Salton Academy	Nominee	
2016	Elle Cosimano	Holding Smoke	Nominee	
2016	Jeyn Roberts	When They Fade	Nominee	
2016	Alexandra Sirowys	The Telling	Nominee	
2017	Kim Liggett	The Last Harvest	Winner	
2017	Gillian French	The Door to January	Nominee	
2017	Tom Leveen	Hellworld	Nominee	
2017	Amy Lukavics	The Ravenous	Nominee	
2017	Sarah Porter	When I Cast Your Shadow	Nominee	
2018	Kiersten White	The Dark Descent of Elizabeth Frankenstein	Winner	
2018	Jonathan Maberry	Broken Lands	Nominee	
2018	Justina Ireland	Dread Nation	Nominee	
2018	Monique Snyman	The Night Weaver	Nominee	
2018	Claire Legrand	Sawkill Girls	Nominee	
2019	Nzondi	Oware Mosaic	Winner	
2019	Peter Adam Salomon	Eight Minutes, Thirty-Two Seconds	Nominee	
2019	Ann Dávila Cardinal	Five Midnights	Nominee	
2019	Amelinda Bérubé	Here There Are Monsters	Nominee	
2019	Kate Alice Marshall	Rules for Vanishing	Nominee	
2019	Liana Gardner	Speak No Evil	Nominee	
2020	Adam Cesare	Clown in a Cornfield	Winner	
2020	Daniel Kraus	Bent Heavens	Nominee	
2020	Monique Snyman	The Bone Carver	Nominee	
2020	Aiden Thomas	Cemetery Boys	Nominee	
2020	Erica Waters	Ghost Wood Song	Nominee	
2021	Erica Waters	The River Has Teeth	Winner	
2021	Kendare Blake	All These Bodies	Nominee	
2021	Jessica Lewis	Bad Witch Burning	Nominee	
2021	R. L. Boyle	The Book of the Baku	Nominee	
2021	Krystal Sutherland	House of Hollow	Nominee	
2022	Robert P. Ottone	The Triangle	Winner	
2022	Ann Fraistat	What We Harvest	Nominee	
2022	Tiffany D. Jackson	The Weight of Blood	Nominee	
2022	Kate Alice Marshall	These Fleeting Shadows	Nominee	
2022	V. E. Schwab	Gallant	Nominee	
2022	Vincent Tirado	Burn Down, Rise Up	Nominee	
2023
2023	Trang Thanh Tran	She Is a Haunting	Winner	
2023	Kalynn Bayron	You’re Not Supposed to Die Tonight	Nominee	
2023	Cherie Dimaline	Funeral Songs for Dying Girls	Nominee	
2023	Kristen Simmons	Find Him Where You Left Him Dead	Nominee	
2023	Cynthia Leitich Smith	Harvest House	Nominee	
2024
2024	Adam Cesare	Clown in a Cornfield 3: The Church of Frendo	Winner	
2024	Ann Fraistat	A Place for Vanishing	Nominee	
2024	Natalie C. Parker	Come Out, Come Out	Nominee	
2024	Lora Senf	The Losting Fountain	Nominee	
2024	Joelle Wellington	The Blonde Dies First	Nominee	
2025	Clay McLeod Chapman	Shiny Happy People	Winner	
2025	Linda Cheng	Beautiful Brutal Bodies	Finalist	
2025	Rin Chupeco	We’re Not Safe Here	Finalist	
2025	Diana Rodriguez Wallach	The Silenced	Finalist	
2025	Madeleine Roux	A Girl Walks Into The Forest	Finalist	
