= Believe Me: The Abduction of Lisa McVey =

2018 crime drama television film

- Written by: Christina Welsh
- Directed by: Jim Donovan
- Starring: Katie Douglas; Rossif Sutherland; David James Elliott
- Music by: Keegan Jessamy; Bryan Mitchell
- Country of origin: Canada
- Original language: English

Production
- Producers: Charles Tremayne; Jeff Vanderwal
- Running time: 87 minutes

Original release
- Network: Lifetime; Showcase
- Release: September 30, 2018

Believe Me: The Abduction of Lisa McVey is a 2018 American true crime film, filmed in Canada, directed by Jim Donovan. The film was released on September 30, 2018, by Lifetime in United States and by Showcase in Canada. On June 4, 2021, it was released worldwide by Netflix. The film stars Katie Douglas, Rossif Sutherland, and David James Elliott. The film recounts the true story of Lisa McVey, who was abducted and raped for 26 hours by serial killer Bobby Joe Long in 1984.

In addition to its television broadcast, the film also received a special theatrical screening in Tampa, at the very same theater where Bobby Joe Long was arrested in 1984. The screening of this movie was attended by the real Lisa McVey Noland.

== Plot ==
Seventeen-year-old Lisa McVey lives with her neglectful grandmother Diane and Diane's boyfriend, Morris Elwood, in Tampa, Florida. Morris regularly sexually abuses Lisa, and her grandmother ignores it. One night on her way home from her job at a doughnut shop, Lisa is kidnapped by Bobby Joe Long. He rapes her in his car before he takes her back to his studio apartment. Diane reports her missing, but casually assumes that she has run away.

Bobby holds Lisa captive in his apartment, keeps her bound and blindfolded, and continually rapes her. When it is revealed that Bobby has been hurt by many women in the past, Lisa is kind and empathetic towards Bobby to gain his trust. Meanwhile, she leaves her fingerprints on surfaces in his bathroom and strands of her hair under his bed. She also memorizes as much as she can about Bobby and his apartment when she temporarily removes her blindfold while he is sleeping.

After 26 hours, Bobby tells Lisa that he must get rid of her. He takes her to a secluded wooded area and holds a gun to her head. After hearing her plead for her life, Bobby lets her go and flees the scene in his car. Lisa memorizes her surroundings and then makes her way home. She bursts into her house and tells her grandmother what happened to her, but she and Morris refuse to believe her. Diane finally calls the police and they come to get Lisa for questioning.

At the police station, a team of detectives are working on an extensive case, involving nine women who have been found dead over the past few months. Sergeant Larry Pinkerton, who specializes in sex crimes, assigns himself to Lisa's case. Other detectives find her story unconvincing because of how much detailed information she provides. Pinkerton believes Lisa and also believes her abductor to be the serial killer they are searching for. Pinkerton sends Lisa's clothes for forensic testing; fibers on them match the fibers found on all bodies of the nine dead women.

Pinkerton and Lisa grow closer over time. She also confides in him about what is happening at home, and Morris is later arrested for child abuse. Pinkerton removes Lisa from Diane's home and puts her in protective housing for young adults. Over the next few days, Lisa takes Pinkerton through her ordeal, starting in the parking lot where she was abducted, and recalls the turns that she remembers Bobby making on the drive to his apartment. Not long after, she discovers the tree at which she was left, and the police set up a two-mile radius search.

Pinkerton's deputy searches the area and spots a car that is similar to the one Lisa described Bobby driving. He manages to take a photograph of Bobby, which allows a positive identification of him by Lisa. Forensics later search his apartment and find all of the forensic evidence that Lisa left behind. On November 16, 1984, Bobby is arrested outside a movie theater. Lisa is applauded for her bravery and her help with the case.

Pinkerton offers Lisa a place at his house but she politely declines and goes to live with Aunt Carol and Uncle Jim. She tells Pinkerton that he has not seen the last of her, and both share an emotional goodbye before she drives away.

A postscript revealed that Lisa lived happily with Aunt Carol, Uncle Jim, and their daughter Lorrie for many years. Pinkerton remains friends with Lisa to this day. As it shows the real-life Lisa near the same tree before she drives off, the postscript continues by stating that Lisa became a deputy sergeant in sex crimes and works to protect young people from situations similar to hers. Bobby Joe Long remains on death row. A later airing of the film adds that he was eventually executed in prison by lethal injection in 2019.

== Cast ==
- Katie Douglas as Lisa McVey
  - Deanna Interbartolo as Young Lisa McVey
- Rossif Sutherland as Bobby Joe Long
- David James Elliott as Detective Sergeant Larry Pinkerton
- Bruno Verdoni as Morris Elwood
- Megan Fahlenbock as Betty McVey
- Amanda Arcuri as Lorrie McVey
  - Kiera Scharf as Young Lori McVey
- Kim Horsman as Grandma Diane McVey
- Shelby Bain as Sarah Pinkerton
- Jamie Robinson as Ed
- Milton Barnes as Detective Lopez
- Patrice Goodman as Detective Russell
- Alexandra Castillo as Detective King
- Kerry Griffin as Uncle Jim
- Catherine Tait as Aunt Carol
- Lisa McVey as herself (cameo scene in postscript)

== Awards ==
The film won the Canadian Screen Award for Best TV Movie and Best Writing in a Television Film (Christina Welsh), at the 8th Canadian Screen Awards in 2020. It was also nominated for Best Lead Performance in a Television Film or Miniseries (Douglas), Best Supporting Actor in a Drama Series or Program (Sutherland), Best Direction in a Television Film (Donovan), and Best Photography in a Drama Program or Series (Sasha Moric).

Douglas received an ACTRA Award nomination for Outstanding Performance by an Actress from ACTRA's Toronto chapter in 2019. The film received three Directors Guild of Canada award nominations, for Best Production Design in a Television Film (Helen Kotsonis), Best Editing in a Television Film (Lisa Grootenboer) and Best Sound Editing in a Television Film (Brian Eimer, Michael Bonini).
