= Video Night =

2013 novel by Adam Cesare

- Author: Adam Cesare
- Language: English
- Genre: Horror
- Published: 2013, Samhain Publishing
- Publication place: United States
- Media type: Print, ebook
- Pages: 248 pages
- ISBN: 978-1-61921-227-5
- Preceded by: Bone Meal Broth
- Followed by: The Summer Job

Video Night is a 2013 horror novel by American author Adam Cesare. The book was first published on January 1, 2013 through Samhain Publishing and is Cesare's fourth book.

== Synopsis ==
Teens Billy and Tom have had a ritual of meeting up for a movie night for a while now. The two couldn't be more different from each other, as Billy is the smart one while Tom comes from the poor side of town, yet they're the best of friends. That friendship has begun to crumble as of late with the impending threat of college and separation. Tom's habit of using their movie nights as an excuse to meet up with his girlfriend has also taken a strain on the friendship as well. However all of that changes in one night after aliens take over the townspeople one by one and the teens must rely on their horror movie knowledge to survive.

== Reception ==
Critical reception for Video Night has been mostly positive and Fearnet called it one of their "Best Reads of 2012". Dread Central and Fangoria both praised the novel, and Fangoria noted that the book was "remarkably solid and assured". Publishers Weekly gave a more mixed review, remarking "While Cesare nods to deeper ideas about body horror and class conflict, the plot careens along from set piece to set piece without paying much attention to its underpinnings."
