= Lisa McVey =

American police officer and motivational speaker, kidnapping victim of Bobby Joe Long

- Born: March 1967 (age 59); Tampa, Florida, U.S.
- Occupations: Police officer; Motivational speaker
- Known for: Helped with the capture of Bobby Joe Long

Lisa McVey (born March 1967) is a retired American Hillsborough County School Resource Deputy, published author and motivational speaker from Tampa, Florida. At age seventeen, she was abducted by Bobby Joe Long, a serial killer and rapist who sexually assaulted and murdered at least ten women in the Tampa Bay area in 1984, at least one after the assault on McVey. The crucial information McVey provided to police directly led to Long's capture two weeks later, preventing yet more casualties and ultimately inspiring her 30-year career in law enforcement.

== History of abuse ==
McVey has candidly recounted her experience as a victim of abuse, even before her abduction. She had been forced by her mother to move in with and take care of her grandmother at age fourteen. Previously, she had been in and out of foster care. "I was being sexually abused at home. My grandmother's boyfriend used to put a gun to my head every time he molested me for three years. It was nothing new to me. One bad situation got me to another bad situation is what saved my life. Because the night before [the abduction] I'm doing my suicide note and the next night I'm fighting for my life."

== Abduction ==
On November 3, 1984, McVey was snatched from her bicycle on the ride to her grandmother's home after work. She was blindfolded, held at gunpoint, raped, and tortured for 26 hours. She would later learn that the perpetrator was Bobby Joe Long, who was responsible for at least 10 murders and over 50 rapes.

During her captivity, McVey offered to be his secret girlfriend. She then elicited sympathy from Long by claiming to be the only child of an ill father. He was persuaded to release her and did so in a remote location, instructing her to keep her blindfold on for five minutes while he escaped. Upon arriving at home, she was beaten by her guardian’s boyfriend and interrogated for five hours about her whereabouts. Her account remained consistent and finally a phone call was made to the police.

McVey had committed to memory several details about her abduction and intentionally left fingerprints on several surfaces in Long's bathroom to help police identify her in the event of her death. Through her description of her captor, his vehicle, the route they took, and other details, police were able to track down Long and connect him to other crimes. Officers began a surveillance operation and arrested Long on November 16, 1984, for sexual assault and kidnapping of McVey.

On September 23, 1985, Long pled guilty to his crimes against McVey and to an additional eight counts of first-degree murder, eight counts of kidnapping, and seven counts of sexual battery. He received life sentences on every count in Hillsborough County. Additionally, he received two death sentences for the murders of Michelle Denise Simms and Virginia Johnson.

When Long was executed on May 23, 2019, McVey and another survivor, Linda Nuttall, were present.

== Career ==
In 1995, McVey began working for the Hillsborough County Parks and Recreation department. When she reported a break-in at the office, the deputy who came to the scene said, "You've got the attitude to be a cop. Ever thought of that?" In 1999, she was transferred to the Hillsborough County Sheriff's Office as a dispatcher and became a reserve deputy. She put herself through the police academy and was deputized in 2004. She works in the same department that found and arrested her captor specializing in combating sex crimes and working to protect children.

She also works as a middle school resource officer and uses her story to teach students how to handle potentially dangerous situations.

== In media ==
- I Survived... (Season 7 Episode 7)
- McVey tells her story with author Joy Wellman in the 1997 book, Smoldering Embers.
- McVey features in the documentary crime series "Surviving Evil" hosted by Charisma Carpenter in the 2013 episode "Nobody's Victim."
- Her story is dramatized in the 2018 television film Believe Me: The Abduction of Lisa McVey, directed by Jim Donovan and which was originally broadcast on Showcase (Canada) and Lifetime (U.S.) where Katie Douglas portrays Lisa. On June 4, 2021, the film was released on Netflix in the U.K. and other markets.

== See also ==
- List of kidnappings
