= Bobby Joe Long =

American serial killer (1953–2019)

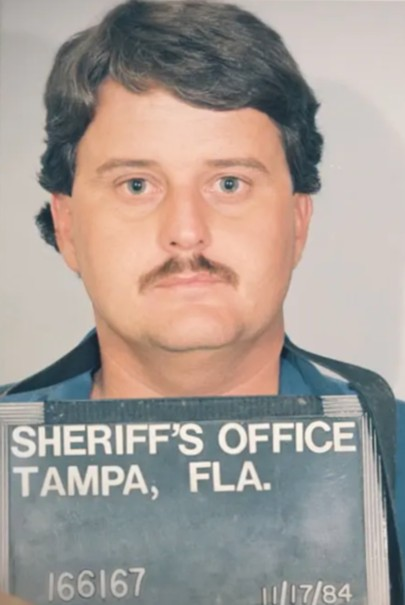
- Long's mugshot in 1984
- Born: Bobby Joe Long; October 14, 1953; Kenova, West Virginia, U.S.
- Died: May 23, 2019 (aged 65); Florida State Prison, Florida, U.S.
- Other names: The Classified Ad Rapist; The Adman Rapist
- Spouse: Cynthia Barlett (m. 1974; div. 1980)
- Children: 2
- Status: Executed by lethal injection
- Convictions: First degree murder (8 counts); Armed burglary; Aggravated assault; Kidnapping (11 counts); Robbery (2 counts); Sexual battery (10 counts)
- Penalty: Death (July 25, 1986)

Details
- Victims: 10
- Span of crimes: March 27 – November 12, 1984
- Country: United States
- State: Florida
- Date apprehended: November 16, 1984
- Imprisoned at: Florida State Prison

Bobby Joe Long, also known as Robert J. Long (Note: The Florida Department of Corrections inmate database recorded Long's name as "Robert J. Long", but Long's birth certificate from West Virginia recorded his name at birth as Bobby Joe Long.) (October 14, 1953 – May 23, 2019), was an American serial killer and rapist. During an eight-month period in 1984, Long abducted, sexually assaulted, and murdered at least ten women in the Tampa Bay area in Florida. At trial, Long was sentenced to death for one of the murders and life for seven others. He was sentenced to death in 1986 by the state of Florida for the murder of Michelle Denise Simms. He was executed by lethal injection on May 23, 2019.

== Early life ==
Bobby Joe Long was born on October 14, 1953, in Kenova, West Virginia, to Joe and Louetta Long. Long was born with an extra X chromosome, also known as 47,XXY, a specific variant of Klinefelter syndrome. This condition results in excessive estrogen production, resulting in development of female traits such as breasts. Long was teased as a child for his large breasts and underwent breast reduction surgery in adolescence. He sustained multiple head injuries in various childhood accidents.

Long had a dysfunctional relationship with his mother, sleeping in her bed until he was a teenager, and reportedly resented the multiple short-term boyfriends she brought with her when returning home late at night from her job. Long married his high-school girlfriend in 1974, with whom he had two children before she filed for divorce in 1980, citing domestic and sexual abuse.

== Crimes ==
Long moved to the Tampa Bay area in 1983. In 1984, while on probation for assault, Long raped and strangled 20-year-old Artiss "Ann" Wick in March; her body was discovered in a rural area on November 22, 1984. She had reportedly hitch-hiked from Gas City, Indiana, to Tampa, and was engaged to be married. Long also attacked 33-year-old Linda Nuttall in her home.

In the early hours of November 3, 1984, Long abducted 17-year-old Lisa McVey as she rode her bike home from work. He blindfolded Lisa and took her to his home where he repeatedly raped and sodomized her. Aware of the danger she was in, McVey reported leaving as many fingerprints in Long's home as she could, as well as a barrette, to aid any future police investigation. After 26 hours, Long released McVey and she provided investigators with information about his home, car, and a time period in which she heard him use an ATM. This led to police identifying Long and he was arrested on November 16, 1984. He was linked to the murders through red carpet fibers found on the bodies of several victims.

== Capture ==
At the time of his capture, Long was wanted in three Tampa Bay area jurisdictions where investigators had collected multiple forms of forensic evidence, including clothing, carpet fibers, semen, ligature marks, and rope knots.

Long was arrested outside a movie theater on November 16, 1984, and charged with the sexual battery and kidnapping of Lisa McVey. Long signed a formal Miranda waiver, and consented to questioning. After the detectives procured a confession for the McVey case, their questioning focused on a series of unsolved sexual battery homicides in the Tampa Bay area. As the detectives questioned Long about the murders, he replied, "I'd rather not answer that."

The detectives continued the interrogation, and handed Long photographs of the various murder victims. At this point, Long stated, "The complexion of things sure have [sic] changed since you came back into the room. I think I need an attorney." No attorney was provided, and Long eventually confessed to eight murders in Hillsborough County, and one murder in Pasco County.

Fiber evidence analysis by the FBI linked Long's vehicle to most of his victims.

== Trial ==
The Hillsborough County State Attorney's Office and the Public Defender's Office of Hillsborough County reached a plea bargain deal. Long pleaded guilty on September 24, 1985, to eight homicides and the abduction and rape of Lisa McVey, receiving 26 life sentences without the possibility of parole (24 concurrent and two to run consecutively to the first 24) and seven life sentences with the possibility of parole after 25 years. The State retained the option to seek the death penalty for the murder of Michelle Simms. In July 1986, Long was found guilty and was sentenced to die in Florida by lethal injection.

Although Long confessed to raping and killing women, his confession was thrown out. His trial proceeded straight to the penalty phase, which was possible in the 1980s. In early 1985, he received the death penalty.

Long was convicted and appealed his first degree murder conviction and death sentence for crimes committed in Hillsborough County. Long appealed his first degree murder conviction and sentence of death in the death of Virginia Johnson.

On appeal, Long's death sentence was vacated, his conviction reversed, and his case remanded back to the trial court with directions to enter an order of acquittal for the murder of Virginia Johnson.

== Victims ==
Long was linked to the murders of ten women, who were killed from March to November 1984. The victims were:

- Artiss "Ann" Wick, 20 – killed on March 27, 1984
- Ngeun Thi "Lana" Long, 19 – killed on May 13, 1984
- Michelle Denise Simms, 22 – killed on May 27, 1984
- Elizabeth Loudenback, 22 – killed on June 8, 1984
- Victoria Marie "Vicky" Elliott, 21 – killed on September 7, 1984
- Kimberly Kyle Hopps, 22 – killed on October 1, 1984
- Chanel Devoun Williams, 18 – killed on October 7, 1984
- Karen Beth Dinsfriend, 28 – killed on October 14, 1984
- Virginia Lee Johnson, 18 – killed on November 6, 1984
- Kimberly Marie Swann, 21 – killed on November 12, 1984

(Note: some reports say Wick was 18) He was convicted of killing all of them with the exception of Wick, and his conviction for Johnson's murder was overturned.

== Execution ==
On April 23, 2019, Florida Governor Ron DeSantis signed Long's death warrant, the first death warrant he had signed since taking office in January 2019. His subsequent appeals denied, he was executed by lethal injection on May 23, 2019, more than thirty years after his conviction. He ate his final meal at 9:30 a.m. local time; he requested roast beef, bacon, French fries, and soda. He was pronounced dead at 7:00 p.m., having made no last statement.

== TV movies ==
- Bobby Joe Long's story has been depicted in the TV movie Believe Me: The Abduction of Lisa McVey which aired in 2018. The film was directed by Jim Donovan, and stars Katie Douglas as Lisa McVey, Rossif Sutherland as Bobby Joe Long, and David James Elliott as Larry Pinkerton.

== See also ==
- List of people executed in Florida
- List of people executed in the United States in 2019
- List of serial killers by number of victims
- List of serial killers in the United States
- Lonely hearts killer

== Notes ==
Executions carried out in Florida
| Preceded by Jose Antonio Jimenez December 13, 2018 | Bobby Joe Long; May 23, 2019 | Succeeded by Gary Ray Bowles August 22, 2019 |
Executions carried out in the United States
| Preceded by Donnie Edward Johnson – Tennessee May 16, 2019 | Bobby Joe Long – Florida; May 23, 2019 | Succeeded by Christopher Lee Price – Alabama May 30, 2019 |
