= Jamie M. Dagg =

Canadian director and screenwriter

- Born: Timmins, Ontario, Canada
- Occupations: Film director; screenwriter
- Years active: 2000s-present
- Known for: River

Jamie M. Dagg is a Canadian film director and writer, who won the 2016 Academy of Canadian Cinema and Television's Canadian Screen Award for Best First Feature, presented to the year's best feature film directed by a first-time director, for his film River.

== Early life ==
Originally from Timmins, Ontario, Dagg travelled in Southeast Asia for several years beginning at age 18 before moving to Toronto to work in film.

== Career ==
His first short film, Waiting, was released in 2005, and his second, Sunday, was released in 2008. He has also directed music videos for Broken Social Scene, Bedouin Soundclash and Black Rebel Motorcycle Club.

His second feature film, Sweet Virginia, was released in 2017. Dagg received a nomination for the Directors Guild of Canada's DGC Discovery Award.

== Filmography ==
Feature films

Year	Title	Director	Writer	Producer	Notes
2015	River	Yes	Yes	Co-producer	
2017	Sweet Virginia	Yes	No	No	

Short films

Year	Title	Director	Writer	Producer	Notes
2005	Waiting	Yes	Yes	Yes	
2008	Sunday	Yes	Yes	Yes	

Television

Year	Title	Notes
2019	The Punisher	S2.E6 - Nakazat
