= Paris Paris (TV series) =

Canadian TV series

- Genre: Comedy
- Created by: Dominic Desjardins, Rayne Zukerman
- Written by: Dominic Desjardins, Rayne Zukerman
- Directed by: Dominic Desjardins
- Starring: Benoît Mauffette, Maxim Roy
- Music by: Antoine Gratton
- Country of origin: Canada
- Original languages: French; English
- No. of seasons: 2
- No. of episodes: 26

Production
- Producer: Rayne Zukerman
- Running time: 24 min
- Production company: Zazie Films

Original release
- Network: Unis TV
- Release: January 4, 2022 – present

Paris Paris is a Canadian comedy TV series directed by Dominic Desjardins and broadcast on Unis TV. The series is produced by Zazie Films. The season 1 stars Benoît Mauffette, Maxim Roy, Rossif Sutherland, Jeanne Guittet, Balzac Zukerman-Desjardins, Hugues Boucher, and featuring Yves Jacques.

The second season stars Benoît Mauffette, Maxim Roy, Yves Jacques, Olivier Renaud, Jocelyne Zucco, Jeanne Guittet, Damien Robitaille, Maythaila Jérôme-Antoine, Balzac Zukerman-Desjardins, and featuring Isabelle Nanty.

== Synopsis (season 1) ==
Philippe lives in Paris. He dreams of literature, theatre and culture. The problem is that he does not live in Paris, France, but in Paris, Ontario, a quiet little town far from everything, where the only culture is agri-culture. After losing his job as a French teacher, he starts to question his accomplishments. His wife Jenny, his in-laws, and even his 10-year-old son Tom are concerned he’s depressed. Philippe takes a lifetime of pent up frustration out of his old furnace, where he finds a hidden tunnel. The tunnel leads him to a trapdoor, which opens onto a theatre stage. Only, he’s no longer in Ontario, but in France. He starts to lead a double life in both cities, until what happens on one end of the tunnel starts to impact the other.

== Synopsis (season 2) ==
In this second season of Paris Paris, a new passage opens up and the tunnel that once connected two Paris' now connects three. Jenny’s midlife crisis begins after she discovers her husband’s affair with a younger woman. The betrayal violently shakes the foundation of their relationship, but also her own sense of self. It's a rude awakening: she’s sacrificed a large part of her life for work. Even though she once prided herself on her professional success, it suddenly feels vain and meaningless. She also realizes that all her time working has made her miss what feels like the best years with her son. It’s with this deep need to find meaning and reconnect with herself that Jenny takes the tunnel. The tunnel however is full of surprises. Instead of taking Jenny to les Champs-Élysées, it takes her to a highway in rural Texas. Jenny meets Jackie the owner of the local bar, who originally is from Paris France, but over the last 30 years has made a new life for herself and her grown son Randy, a local cop in this small texan town. Jackie’s a generous soul, who embraces the chaos around her and somehow still manages to have a little fun. Her core values are at odds with her son, who’s a jerk and keeps arresting the migrants that come to Jackie’s bar as a safehouse as part of their journey north. Jenny has no idea how to find meaning and reconnect with herself and is looking for answers everywhere. She keeps thinking she’s figured it out, only to return home to Paris Ontario and realize nothing’s changed. But when Randy discovers the tunnel, and that his own identity is made up of half-truths and lies, Jenny’s called to action. She has to protect those around her. When she loses control of the situation and is forced to trust in others, something changes in Jenny. Through all the messiness, she starts to feel again, and this new perspective breathes hope and confidence in what lays ahead and offers her a path forward embracing the chaos and even finding beauty in it.

== Cast (season 1) ==
Character	Portrayed by
Philippe	Benoît Mauffette
Jenny	Maxim Roy
Meursault	Rossif Sutherland
Tom	Balzac Zukerman-Desjardins
Jacquo	Hugues Boucher
Marianne	Jeanne Guittet
Fabioli	Yves Jacques
M. Turnbull	Jean-Michel Le Gal
Doctor Will	Pierre Simpson
Helen	Djennie Laguerre
Gilles Belanger	Michael Healey
Jess	Benjamin Ranieri
Sue	Jocelyne Zucco
Claire	Patricia Tulasne
Vivianne	Sheila Ingabire Isaro
Christophe	Patrick Romango
Vicky	Marie-Claire Marcotte
Rose	Louison Danis
Doctor Daisy	Karine Ricard
Brigadier	Jean-Michel Nadeau
Larry	Allan Michael Brunet
Stephano	Olivier Lamarche
Animateur	Lindsey Owen Pierre

== Episodes (season 1) ==
Num episode	Title
1	The Beast Within
2	Sentimental Education
3	The Moods of Marianne
4	Berenice
5	Flowers of Evil
6	No Trifling with Love
7	From the Earth to the Moon
8	Lost Illusions
9	In Search of Lost Time
10	Bel Ami
11	Paris Spleen
12	Journey for Myself
13	How It All Ends

== Release ==
On January 4, 2022, the first season of Paris Paris was broadcast on Unis TV. The entire first season became available to stream on Unis TV. On October 5, 2022, the first season became available to stream in English on CBC Gem.

== Reception ==
On the occasion of Paris Paris's Unis TV premiere, Le Devoir's Amélie Gaudreau called the series an "unusual, funny and smart work". "Paris Paris hit the target when it uses the sad fate reserved for Francophones minority setting as a comic relief. This creates memorable scenes, which sometimes makes you want to cry more than laugh." Le Droit's Yves Bergeras called the series "succulent", praising its "cheerful" cast.
