= River (2015 Canadian film) =

2015 film

- Film poster
- Directed by: Jamie M. Dagg
- Written by: Jamie M. Dagg
- Produced by: Nick Sorbara
- Starring: Rossif Sutherland; Sara Botsford; Douangmany Soliphanh; Ted Atherton
- Cinematography: Adam Marsden
- Edited by: Duff Smith
- Production company: Redlab Digital
- Distributed by: Elevation Pictures; XYZ Films
- Release date: 1 June 2015
- Running time: 95 minutes
- Countries: Canada; Laos
- Languages: French; English; Laotian; Thai

River is a Canadian thriller film directed by Jamie M. Dagg. It premiered in the Discovery section of the 2015 Toronto International Film Festival. The film was chosen as the winner of the Academy of Canadian Cinema and Television's Claude Jutra Award, as the year's best feature film directed by a first-time director. Rossif Sutherland garnered a Canadian Screen Award nomination for Best Actor at the 4th Canadian Screen Awards.

== Plot ==
John Lake (Rossif Sutherland) is an American doctor working in Laos. After he intervenes to stop the sexual assault of a young woman, the assailant is found dead the next morning — thus leaving Lake open to charges of murder if he cannot prove his innocence, and forcing him on the run back to the American embassy in Vientiane.

== Cast ==
- Rossif Sutherland as John Lake
- Douangmany Soliphanh as Douangmany
- Sara Botsford as Dr. Stephanie Novella
- Ted Atherton as Patrick Reardon
- David Soncin as Simon
- Aidan Gillett as Lachlan
- Vithaya Pansringarm as The Bartender
