= Sweet Virginia (film) =

2017 film directed by Jamie M. Dagg

- Theatrical release poster
- Directed by: Jamie M. Dagg
- Written by: Benjamin China; Paul China
- Produced by: Chris Ferguson; Brian Kavanaugh-Jones; Fernando Loureiro; Roberto Vasconcellos
- Starring: Jon Bernthal; Christopher Abbott; Imogen Poots; Rosemarie DeWitt; Odessa Young; Jared Abrahamson
- Cinematography: Jessica Lee Gagné
- Edited by: Duff Smith
- Music by: Brooke Blair; Will Blair
- Production companies: Automatik Entertainment; Exhibit; Oddfellows Entertainment; XYZ Films
- Distributed by: IFC Films
- Release dates: April 21, 2017 (Tribeca Film Festival); November 17, 2017 (United States)
- Running time: 95 minutes
- Countries: United States; Canada
- Language: English

Sweet Virginia is a 2017 neo-noir thriller film directed by Jamie M. Dagg, written by Benjamin China and Paul China, and starring Jon Bernthal, Christopher Abbott, Imogen Poots, Rosemarie DeWitt, Odessa Young and Jared Abrahamson. It was released on November 17, 2017, by IFC Films.

== Plot ==
Tom, Lou, and Mitchel are playing poker at Lou's bar. A man enters and asks to be served. When Mitchel tells him to leave because the bar is closed, the man threatens him and angrily leaves. The man returns and shoots Lou, Mitchel, and Tom. The next morning Sam wakes up after dreaming about his former days as a bull rider. He starts his morning at the motel by reading about the shootings in the paper and then responding to a disturbance in room 128. Sam politely and shyly asks the guest to quiet down, only to have the door shut in his face. Later that day, Tom's wife, Bernadette, goes on the porch during a gathering for her deceased husband and asks Sam if he can come by to no avail. Sam has trouble lifting his right arm and walks with a limp due to injuries suffered from bull riding. Bernadette, ignoring Sam's earlier wish, wakes Sam in the middle of the night for sex to which he obliges. They discuss whether Tom is in heaven or hell and Sam seems regretful of his relationship with Bernadette. Upon leaving the next morning, Bernadette picks up the picture Sam laid down. The photo is of a woman and a young girl.

Lila meets the man who shot Mitchel, her husband, and asks why he killed Tom and Lou instead of only killing Mitchel as planned. Showing no remorse, he blames her for the circumstances because Mitchel didn't leave the bar as she said he would. The man then tells her she should be celebrating because Mitchel has been killed as she wanted. He asks about his payment, and Lila tells him she will have it by the end of the week after she meets with Mitchel's lawyer. Lila tells the man she wanted Mitchel dead because he'd been unfaithful. Upon visiting Mitchel's lawyer, Lila learns that Mitchel was bankrupt, had lied about his life-insurance policies, and was being sued by former business partners. The bank now owns her home and there is no money. Mitchel's killer later approaches Sam at the motel and introduces himself as Elwood. He extends his stay at the motel and begins giving Sam praise as a famous bull rider. He tells Sam that his father was a huge fan of Sam and would have loved to meet him but he's now deceased. Sam befriends Elwood, and they go to a local diner where Sam talks about his health and why he shakes. Sam seems puzzled when Elwood tells him about his mother's death and how his father was absent due to incarceration. Elwood says his father died in a prison riot in 1996 and shows a strong disdain for him. Elwood asks Sam if he has a girlfriend, and Sam admits he does. When Lila enters the diner after riding with Bernadette to get milkshakes, Sam calls her over to the table and introduces her to Elwood. Taken aback, she pretends not to know Elwood before quickly leaving. Later that night, on the way home from Bernadette's house, Lila is followed by Elwood but is able to evade him.

After a phone call with his mother, Elwood becomes enraged and instigates a fight with two men. After calling Lila and leaving her a threatening voicemail, he violently beats the two men before leaving. Later that night, Lila receives the threatening voicemail and tries to run away from home, but is attacked by Elwood. He demands payment, and again she tells him she can get the money. Satisfied, he leaves and meets with Paul to enlist his services to which Paul agrees. Sam leaves Maggie's basketball game to spend the night with Bernadette. Once Sam has left her home, Elwood and Paul approach the house while she is in the bathtub. Hearing a noise, Bernadette goes to investigate and is chased by Paul while Elwood breaks into a wall safe. She stabs and kills Paul and is chased by Elwood. He subdues and almost shoots Bernadette, but stops when he notices Sam's hat on the counter. Elwood takes the money from the safe and leaves.

Upon returning to the motel, Sam finds a tenant complaining about the noise in room 128. Sam knocks on the door and assaults the guest and drags him out of the room. However, because of his injury, he's unable to fight and defend himself. Sam is easily overpowered and left lying in the rain. Sam drives to Bernadette's home when she didn't pick up his call and learns about the break-in. Elwood, injured in the struggle with Bernadette, tries sneaking out the next morning but is stopped by Sam who merely wants to say goodbye and help. However, Sam notices that Elwood is bleeding and realizes he is the one who robbed Bernadette. Elwood chases Sam into an occupied motel room, shoots and kills a guest in the process. Elwood searches the room but finds that Sam has escaped through the bathroom window. Sam then runs to the motel office to grab his grandfather's rifle and tells Elwood to stay until the police arrive. Elwood refuses, claiming that they are "square", a reference to him letting Bernadette live. Elwood attempts to get in his car to flee, but Sam shoots him in the back and kills him. The police find Lila's name and phone number written on a piece of paper in Elwood's room. She is arrested and the final images are of Bernadette trimming Sam's hair and Sam riding a bull in a competition.

== Cast ==
- Jon Bernthal as Sam Rossi
- Christopher Abbott as Elwood
- Imogen Poots as Lila McCabe
- Rosemarie DeWitt as Bernadette "Bernie" Barrett
- Odessa Young as Maggie Russell
- Jared Abrahamson as Paul Anderson
- Joseph Lyle Taylor as Tom Barrett
- Jonathan Tucker as Mitchell McCabe
- Gabrielle Rose as Rose Miller
- Darcy Laurie as Marty Petrowne
- Scott A. McGillivray as Lloyd Stothers
- Garry Chalk as Lou Hopkins

== Reception ==
On the review aggregator website Rotten Tomatoes, 79% of 57 critics' reviews are positive, with an average rating of 6.8/10. The website's consensus reads: "Smart and well-acted, Sweet Virginia delivers a tense, atmospheric thriller that transcends genre conventions even as it embraces them." Metacritic, which uses a weighted average, assigned the film a score of 72 out of 100, based on 13 critics, indicating "generally favorable" reviews.

== Release ==
The film premiered at the Tribeca Film Festival on April 21, 2017. On May 9, 2017, IFC Films acquired distribution rights to the film. The film was released on November 17, 2017, by IFC Films. For directing, Dagg was nominated for the Directors Guild of Canada's DGC Discovery Award.
