= Lazareth =

- Theatrical release poster
- Directed by: Alec Tibaldi
- Written by: Alec Tibaldi
- Produced by: Robert Ogden Barnum; Eric Binns
- Starring: Ashley Judd; Sarah Pidgeon; Katie Douglas; Asher Angel
- Cinematography: Martim Vian
- Edited by: Joel Griffen
- Music by: Idem
- Production companies: TPC; The Barnum Picture Company
- Distributed by: Vertical
- Release date: May 10, 2024
- Running time: 86 minutes
- Country: United States
- Language: English

Lazareth is a 2024 American thriller film written and directed by Alec Tibaldi and starring Ashley Judd, Sarah Pidgeon, Katie Douglas, and Asher Angel.

== Plot ==
A woman protects her orphaned nieces from a self-destructing world, raising them in isolation until an outsider threatens their peaceful existence.

== Cast ==
- Ashley Judd as Lee
- Katie Douglas as Imogen
- Sarah Pidgeon as Maeve
- Asher Angel as Owen
- Edward Balaban as Morian

== Production ==
In May 2023, it was announced that filming had wrapped in Oregon.

== Release ==
The film was released in select theaters and on demand on May 10, 2024.

== Reception ==
The film has a 50% rating on Rotten Tomatoes based on 24 reviews. Matthew Donato of Collider rated the film a 5 out of 10. Julian Roman of MovieWeb awarded the film two and a half stars out of five. Nell Minow of RogerEbert.com awarded the film two and a half stars out of four.
