= Adam Cesare =

American writer

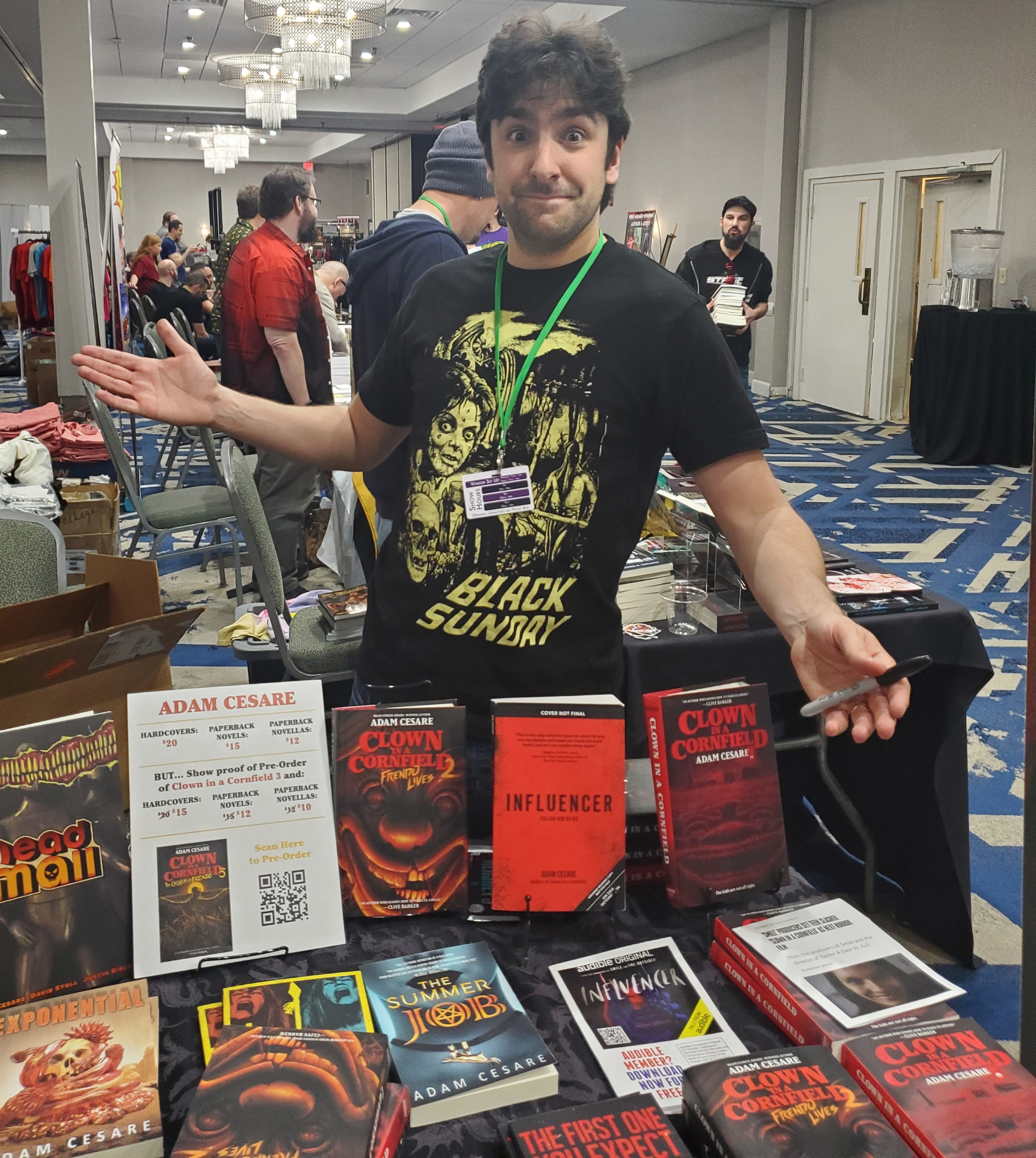
- Adam Cesare at the 2024 AuthorCon
- Born: January 27, 1988 (age 38)
- Education: Boston University
- Occupation: Author
- Known for: Video Night

Adam Cesare is an American author of horror novels and short stories. He attended Boston University, where he studied English and film.

In 2020, Cesare's Clown in a Cornfield won the 2020 Bram Stoker Award for Superior Achievement in Young Adult Novel.

In 2026 his novelisation of the Toxic Avenger film won a Scribe Award for best adapted novel.

== Bibliography ==
=== Novels and novellas ===
- Bound By Jade (2012)
- Tribesmen (2012)
- Video Night (2013)
- The Summer Job (2014)
- The First One You Expect (2014)
- Jackpot (2014, with David Bernstein, Shane McKenzie and Kristopher Rufty)
- Exponential (2014)
- Bottom Feeders (2015, with Cameron Pierce)
- Zero Lives Remaining (2015)
- Mercy House (2015)
- Crawling Darkness (2016, with Cameron Pierce)
- The Con Season (2016)
- Clown in a Cornfield (2020)
- Clown in a Cornfield 2: Frendo Lives (2022)
- Influencer (2023, originally released as an Audible Exclusive Audiobook, Temple Hill entertainment)
- Clown in a Cornfield 3: The Church of Frendo (2024)
- Clown in a Cornfield 4: Lights! Camera! Frendo! (2026)

=== Short story collections ===
- Bone Meal Broth (2012)

Short stories collected:

- The still
- Flies in the Brain
- Rollin & Jeanie
- Pink Tissue
- Border Jumper
- Trap
- The New Model
- The Girls in the Wood
- The White Halloween

The book was expanded in 2016 with two new stories from the author.

The two additional stories are:

- Bringing Down The Giants
- So Bad

- All-Night Terror (2013, with Matt Serafini)

Short stories collected:

- Gore Galore
- Bringing Down The Giants
- Killing time in the Off-Season

The book was expanded in 2016 with two new stories from each author.

For Adam Cesare, they were:

- A New Kind of Image
- Savior Girl in Philly Hell

- The Blackest eyes (2016)

Short stories collected:

- The Blackest eyes
- Me, Debased: A The First One You Expect Side-Story

First short story The Blackest eyes was later added to the 2018 short stories collection Dead Bait 4, Severed Press

=== Comics ===
- The morning ritual in Adventure Time 2017 SPOookTACULAR #1, short comics story, BOOM! studios (2017)
- Power rangers: in space in Mighty Morphin Power Rangers 2018 Annual Shattered Grid , short comics story, BOOM! studios (2018)
- Jim Henson's The Dark Crystal: Age of Resistance #5-8, comics story, BOOM! studios (2020).

reprinted as the hardcover graphic novel "Jim Henson's The Dark Crystal: Age of Resistance Vol. 2: The Ballad of Hup & Barfinnious"

- Dead Mall #1-4, comics story, Dark Horse Comics (2022-2023).

=== Screenplays ===
- Last Night at Terrace Lanes (2024, with Jenna St. John)
- Ghost Game (2024)
- Clown in a Cornfield (2025, with Carter Blanchard and Eli Craig)

=== Other works ===
- Leprechaun in the Hood: The Musical: A Novel (serialized online during 2014, with Cameron Pierce and Shane McKenzie)
- So bad in original edition of Zero Lives Remaining, short story, Shock Totem (2015)

Later added to the 2016 expanded edition of Bone meal Broth, Black T-Shirt Books

- In the flat light in Giallo fantastique, short story, World Horde (2015)
- Starting early in Dark gallows: 10 Halloween haunts , short story, Scarlet galleon publications LLC (2015)

Also included in the 2017 edition of Zero Lives Remaining, Black T-Shirt Books.

- Readings off the charts in Year's Best Hardcore Horror Volume 1, short story, Comet Press (2016)
- Killing time in the Off-season in The Healing Monsters (Volume 2), short story, Despumation Press (2016)
- The missing years in The gruesome tensome , short story, Novello publishers (2016)
- Please subscribe in Splatterpunk's not dead, short story, CreateSpace Independent Publishing Platform (2016)

Also included in Year's Best Hardcore Horror Volume 2, short story, Comet Press (2017)

- Player agency in Screaming cacti, short story, Thunderstorm Books (2017).
- Moist Air in Clickers Forever, short story, Thunderstorm Books (2018)
- The southern thing in Welcome to the show, short story, Crystal Lake Publishing (2018).
- A certain kind of forest sound in Centralia: Epicenter, short story, Hustle & Heart Films (2020).
- "The Dark Crystal Bestiary: The Definitive Guide to the Creatures of Thra", tie-in book, Insight Editions (2020)
- In the Church and Through the House in Beyond the Book of Eibon, short story, Death Wound Publishing (2021).
- The dogs in my neighborhood in Razorblades issue 4, short story, Tiny Onion Studios (2021).
- Disc Rot in Obsolescence, short story, Shortwave Media LLC (2023).
