= The Summer Job =

2014 novel by Adam Cesare

- Author: Adam Cesare
- Language: English
- Genre: Horror
- Published: 2014, Samhain Publishing
- Publication place: United States
- Media type: Print, ebook
- ISBN: 978-1-61921-812-3
- Preceded by: Video Night
- Followed by: The First One You Expect

The Summer Job is a 2014 horror novel by Adam Cesare. The book was published on January 7, 2014 through Samhain Publishing and centers upon a young woman who takes a summer job that might cost her her life.

== Synopsis ==
Claire, a recent college graduate, is forced to look for a new job after her boyfriend burns down the bar that employed them. She finds a job at a secluded hotel in Mission, Massachusetts that seems too good to be true. Her best friend Allison drives her down there, but the pair arrives so late that Allison is forced to stay overnight. The next morning Allison is missing and Claire is told that she left early to get a head start on the drive home. Unbeknownst to Claire, Allison was actually carried off by the hotel's cook and left for dead in the woods.

The hotel's staff is kind but strange, and Claire finds herself getting constantly warned to stay away from the woods and the aging hippie Davey and his followers. As a former wild child with a strong rebellious streak still remaining, Claire finds herself drawn to this group- especially after meeting Tobin, one of Davey's handsome followers. She ends up sneaking out every night and eventually gets drawn into a battle between the very conservative townspeople of Mission and the wild misfits in the woods.

== Reception ==
Critical reception for The Summer Job has been mostly positive, and Complex placed the book on their list of "The Year's Best Genre Fiction Books (So Far)". Bloody Disgusting gave the book four out of five skulls, criticizing some of the choices of the main character of Claire while overall praising it as "Cesare’s best novel yet". HorrorNews.net also praised Cesare's writing, commenting that the book would be a good introductory point for readers new to his work.
