= The Walk (2022 film) =

- Directed by: Daniel Adams
- Written by: Daniel Adams; George Powell
- Produced by: Michael Mailer; Hank Blumenthal; Paul W. Hazen
- Starring: Justin Chatwin; Terrence Howard; Jeremy Piven; Lovie Simone; Malcolm McDowell
- Cinematography: Don E. FauntLeRoy
- Edited by: Justin Williams
- Music by: Robert ToTeras
- Distributed by: Vertical Entertainment
- Release date: June 10, 2022
- Running time: 105 minutes
- Country: United States
- Language: English

The Walk is a 2022 historical drama film based on true events about the 1974 Boston desegregation busing crisis. Directed by Daniel Adams from a script he co-wrote with George Powell, the film stars Justin Chatwin, Terrence Howard, Jeremy Piven, Lovie Simone and Malcolm McDowell.

== Plot ==
Set in 1974 Boston, the film centers on police officer Bill Coughlin, who is tasked to protect a couple of black students as they are bussed into an all-white high school, Coughlin being also under the pressure of a local crime boss. In the same time, Wendy Robbins, an 18-year-old student and her father Lamont, are caught in the middle of some violent protests on the streets, while Kate, Bill's teenage daughter, is faced with her own racist attitude.

== Cast ==
- Justin Chatwin as Bill Coughlin
- Terrence Howard as Lamont Robbins
- Jeremy Piven as Johnny Bunkley
- Lovie Simone as Wendy Robbins
- Malcolm McDowell as McLaughlin
- Katie Douglas as Kate Coughlin
- Sally Kirkland as Mrs. Kelley
- Jay Huguley as Riley
- Anastasiya Mitrunen
- Jim Gleason
- Maggie Wagner
- Jason Alan Smith
- Tedrick Martin as Riot Cop

== Production ==
On November 13, 2019, it was announced that Daniel Adams will be directing the film from a screenplay he co-wrote with first-time screenwriter George Powell. In April 2021, Justin Chatwin confirmed that he will star in the film. In July 2021, Terrence Howard, Jeremy Piven, Lovie Simone, Malcolm McDowell, Katie Douglas, Jay Huguley, Sally Kirkland, Anastasiya Mitrunen, Jim Gleason, and Maggie Wagner were officially confirmed to be part of the cast.

Principal photography began in New Orleans, Louisiana on June 13, 2021, and concluded on July 12, 2021.

== Release ==
In March 2022, it was announced that Vertical Entertainment had acquired U.S. distribution rights to the film. It was released in theaters and through video on demand in the United States on June 10, 2022.
