= Tucker & Dale vs. Evil =

2010 film by Eli Craig

- Theatrical release poster
- Directed by: Eli Craig
- Screenplay by: Eli Craig; Morgan Jurgenson
- Story by: Eli Craig
- Produced by: Morgan Jurgenson; Albert Klychak; Rosanne Milliken; Deepak Nayar
- Starring: Tyler Labine; Alan Tudyk; Katrina Bowden; Jesse Moss
- Cinematography: David Geddes
- Edited by: Bridget Durnford
- Music by: Michael Shields; Andrew Kaiser
- Production companies: Eden Rock Media; Kintop Pictures; Urban Island; Looby Lou
- Distributed by: Magnet Releasing
- Release dates: January 22, 2010 (Sundance); March 12, 2010 (SXSW); September 30, 2011 (United States)
- Running time: 89 minutes
- Countries: Canada; India; United States
- Language: English
- Budget: $5 million
- Box office: $5.2–$5.5 million

Tucker & Dale vs. Evil is a 2010 comedy horror slasher film directed by Eli Craig, from a screenplay by Craig and Morgan Jurgenson, and based on a story by Craig. Starring Tyler Labine, Alan Tudyk, Katrina Bowden, and Jesse Moss, the film follows Tucker McGee (Tudyk) and Dale Dobson (Labine), two affable but socially awkward hillbillies who go on vacation at their newly acquired lakefront cabin in West Virginia. After Tucker and Dale rescue Allison (Bowden) from drowning in a lake, a group of clueless college students on a camping trip, lead by Chad (Moss), mistake the pair for killers.

Tucker & Dale vs. Evil premiered at the 2010 Sundance Film Festival and was screened at the South by Southwest Film Festival on March 12, 2010, where Craig won the Midnight Audience Award. The film was theatrically released in the United States on September 30, 2011, to critical acclaim, with particular praise for Craig's directing and writing.

== Plot ==
A group of college kids – Allison, Chad, Chloe, Chuck, Jason, Naomi, Todd, Mitch, and Mike – go on a camping trip in West Virginia. While at a gas station, they encounter Tucker and Dale, two well-meaning hillbillies who recently bought an abandoned lakefront cabin in the woods. On Tucker's advice, Dale tries to talk to Allison, but his appearance and nervous behavior frighten her and her friends. While Tucker and Dale repair their cabin, Chad tells the group about the "Memorial Day Massacre", a hillbilly attack that took place 20 years prior. They later go skinny-dipping at a lake where Tucker and Dale are fishing. Startled by the pair, Allison hits her head. The hillbillies save her from drowning, but the others run off, believing they are kidnapping her.

The next day, Allison awakens at Tucker and Dale's cabin. Initially frightened, she gradually befriends them. Concurrently, Chuck leaves to get the police while Chad leads the others in heading to the cabin to save Allison from the hillbillies. They arrive as Tucker unknowingly hits a beehive while cutting wood, causing him to wildly swing his chainsaw. Believing he is attacking them, the group scatters, and Mitch accidentally impales himself on a fallen tree branch. After finding Mitch's body and concluding he was murdered, Chad persuades the others that they are in a battle for survival. They return to the cabin, where they misinterpret Allison and Dale digging an outhouse hole as her digging her own grave and attack. However, Todd impales himself on a spear he brought, Mike dives into a wood chipper while attempting to tackle Tucker, and Allison gets knocked out by Dale's shovel. As Dale takes her inside, Tucker assumes the group are part of a suicide pact and dissuades Dale from calling the police for fear that they will be accused of murder.

Before long, Chuck returns with Sheriff Gurr, who expresses doubt over Tucker and Dale's theory before accidentally killing himself with a loose beam. Chuck grabs Gurr's gun, but accidentally shoots himself with it. Chad returns, taking Dale's dog Jangers hostage. Tucker rescues Jangers, but gets captured by Chad, who tortures him and cuts off two of his fingers to lure out Dale. Dale leaves to save Tucker while Chad and Naomi try to rescue Allison. She explains what happened, but they accuse her of having Stockholm syndrome. Tucker and Dale return and Allison leads everyone in a calm discussion, during which Chad reveals his grandmother told him his father died in the Memorial Day Massacre while his mother was the sole survivor. Jason and Chloe break in to save Allison, but Chad accidentally sets Jason on fire, and Chloe tries to put the fire out by unknowingly throwing an accelerant on him. In the ensuing chaos, Tucker, Dale, and Allison escape; Naomi, Chloe, and Jason are killed; and Chad is injured, disfigured, and becomes mentally unhinged. The trio try to escape in the hillbillies' truck, but crash. An injured Tucker tells Dale that Chad took Allison, and Dale must go save her. Jangers leads Dale to an old sawmill, where Chad threatens to kill Allison for "[going] hillbilly" unless she becomes his girlfriend. However, Dale arrives and rescues her. While barricading themselves upstairs, they find newspaper clippings revealing Chad's father was responsible for the Memorial Day Massacre, which makes Chad "half hillbilly." While Chad is distracted by the revelation, Dale throws a box of chamomile tea at him, causing him to have an asthma attack and fall out of a window to his apparent death.

Three days later, a two-person news crew reports from the cabin that the deaths appear to be part of a suicide pact involving a deranged killer, Chad, whose body is yet to be found. This brings the story full circle with the pre-opening title found footage of Chad killing the news crew. Elsewhere, Tucker convalesces at a hospital while Dale goes bowling with Allison. While there, Dale encourages a fellow hillbilly to talk to some girls, leading to a new misunderstanding while Dale and Allison confess their feelings for each other and kiss.

== Cast ==
- Tyler Labine as Dale Dobson
- Alan Tudyk as Tucker McGee
- Katrina Bowden as Allison
- Jesse Moss as Chad
- Chelan Simmons as Chloe
- Philip Granger as Sheriff Gurr
- Brandon Jay McLaren as Jason
- Christie Laing as Naomi
- Travis Nelson as Chuck
- Alex Arsenault as Todd
- Adam Beauchesne as Mitch
- Joseph Allan Sutherland as Mike
- Karen Reigh as Cheryl
- Tye Evans as Chad's Dad
- Weezer as Jangers

Additionally, the film's director, Eli Craig, and his wife Sasha make cameo appearances as a cameraman and reporter respectively.

== Production ==
The production began in June 2009 with the casting of the actors. Principal photography started one month later in Calgary, Alberta. In October 2009, post production ensued in British Columbia, and the first images were released as part of the American Film Market.

== Reception ==
=== Box office ===
The film premiered on 22 January 2010 at Sundance Film Festival and was on 12 March 2010 part of the SXSW Film Festival. The film was distributed by Magnolia and received a limited theatrical release in the US on 30 September 2011. On its opening weekend, the film grossed $52,843 from 30 theaters. It grossed $223,838 in the US. It grossed between $5 and $5.3 million outside the US.

=== Critical response ===
Rotten Tomatoes, a review aggregator, reports that 86% of 116 surveyed critic gave the film a positive review; the average rating is 6.9/10. The critical consensus states: "Like the best horror/comedies, Tucker & Dale vs. Evil mines its central crazy joke for some incredible scares, laughs, and—believe it or not—heart". The film also has a score of 65 out of 100 on Metacritic based on 23 reviews, indicating "generally favorable reviews".

Todd Gilchrist of Shock Till You Drop wrote: "Eli Craig's feature debut celebrates genre conventions while turning the traditional view of horror film heroes and villains upside down." Roger Ebert also gave the film a positive review, writing: "Students of the Little Movie Glossary may find it funny how carefully Tucker and Dale works its way through upended cliches." Noel Murray of The A.V. Club rated it C+ and called it "surprisingly clever" but "too slick and too cute". Dennis Harvey of Variety wrote that the film "offers good-natured, confidently executed splatstick whose frequent hilarity suffers only from peaking too early."

== Accolades ==
Award	Category	Nominee	Result
Leo Award	Best Cinematography in a Feature Length Drama	David Geddes	Nominated
Leo Award	Best Feature Length Drama	Rosanne Milliken and Crawford Hawkins	Nominated
Leo Award	Best Overall Sound in a Feature Length Drama	Paul A. Sharpe, Graeme Hughes and Iain Pattison	Nominated
Leo Award	Best Sound Editing	James Fonnyadt	Nominated
Leo Award	Best Sound Editing in a Feature Length Drama	Dario DiSanto, Brian Campbell, James Fonnyadt, Jay Cheetham, Kirby Jinnah and Kris Casavant	Nominated
Leo Award	Best Stunt Coordination in a Feature Length Drama	Jodi Stecyk	Nominated
Leo Award	Best Supporting Performance by a Male in a Feature Length Drama	Jesse Moss	Nominated
Sitges Film Festival	Best Film	Eli Craig	Won
SXSW Film Festival	Audience Award	Eli Craig	Won
Fantasia Festival	Jury Prize; Best First Feature	Eli Craig	Won
Ampia Awards	AMPIA Award; Best Feature Film	Eli Craig	Won
Fangoria Chainsaw Awards	Best Actor	Tyler Labine	Nominated
Fangoria Chainsaw Awards	Best Supporting Actress	Katrina Bowden	Nominated
Fangoria Chainsaw Awards	Best Limited-Release/Direct-to-Video Film		Won
Fangoria Chainsaw Awards	Best Screenplay	Eli Craig, Morgan Jurgenson	Won

== Proposed sequel ==
In an interview with Choice Cuts, director Eli Craig expressed thoughts on a sequel titled Tucker and Dale Go To Yale and described it as "Good Will Hunting meets Texas Chain Saw Massacre". In that same interview, Craig also liked Alan Tudyk's idea of doing a sequel that was similar to From Dusk till Dawn.

At HorrorHound Weekend 2014, cast members Tyler Labine and Alan Tudyk confirmed that a sequel was in development. In 2016, the two revealed that they were actively developing the project despite other commitments. When asked about the status of the sequel at Boston Comic Con 2017, Alan Tudyk responded that a script had been written but was disappointing and that the film was unlikely to be moving forward.

== Remake ==
A South Korean remake titled Handsome Guys was released in South Korea on June 26, 2024.
