= Eli Craig =

American screenwriter and film director (born 1972)

- Craig in 2026
- Years active: 2004–present
- Spouse: Sasha Williams (m. 2004)
- Children: 2
- Mother: Sally Field
- Relatives: Peter Craig (brother); Margaret Field (grandmother); Richard D. Field (uncle)

Eli Craig is an American film director, screenwriter, and actor. He is best known for co-writing and directing the cult horror comedy film Tucker & Dale vs. Evil.

== Early life ==
Craig is actress Sally Field's second son with Steve Craig.

== Career ==
In 2010, Craig wrote and directed the cult horror comedy movie Tucker & Dale vs. Evil, which premiered at the Sundance Film Festival and won the audience award at SXSW. In March 2013, Craig directed the pilot episode for a Zombieland television series for Amazon Studios. The pilot was released in April 2013 on Lovefilm and at Amazon Video. On May 17, 2013, Rhett Reese, creator of the TV adaptation, announced that Zombieland: The Series would not be picked up to be a series by Amazon. His next film Little Evil, starring Evangeline Lilly and Adam Scott, was released on Netflix in September 2017 to positive reviews.

== Personal life ==
Craig is a passionate outdoorsman and worked as an Outward Bound instructor for several years after college. He has led climbing trips up the Mountaineer's Route on Mount Whitney, Aconcagua, Mount Rainier, Pico De Orizaba, and Denali.

Craig married actress Sasha Williams in 2004. Together they have two sons.

== Filmography ==
Short film

Year	Title	Director	Writer
2004	The Tao of Pong	Yes	Yes

Feature film

Year	Title	Director	Writer
2010	Tucker & Dale vs. Evil	Yes	Yes
2017	Little Evil	Yes	Yes
2025	Clown in a Cornfield	Yes	Yes
TBA	White Elephant	Yes	Yes

Television

Year	Title	Notes
2010	Brothers & Sisters	Episode: "Get a Room"
2013	Zombieland: The Series	Episode: "Pilot"

Acting roles

Year	Title	Role	Notes
1999	Deal of a Lifetime	Kevin Johnson	
1999	The Rage: Carrie 2	Chuck Potter	
2000	Space Cowboys	Young William "Hawk" Hawkins	
2005	Racer Number 9	Buddy Werner	Short film
2010	Moving Pictures Live!	Himself	Episode "Underground Comedy"
2010	Tucker & Dale vs. Evil	Cameraman	
2017	Little Evil	Derby Official	
