= Brian Chan =

Canadian composer

- Born: Canada
- Occupation: Composer
- Website: http://www.brianchanmusic.com/

Brian Chan is a Canadian composer and multi-instrumentalist.

Chan has written music for CBS's Boston Blue, Wonder Project's It's Not Like That, Netflix's North of North, Nickelodeon's The Fairly OddParents: A New Wish, CBC's Allegiance, Lego Dreamzzz (Season 3), Angry Birds: Summer Madness, DreamWorks Animation's Pinecone & Pony, Team Zenko Go, Fox's Alert: Missing Persons Unit (Seasons 2-3), Sony's Panhandle and Sam Raimi's 50 States of Fright. He is a recipient of the 2024 SOCAN Breakout Composer Award, multiple Canadian Screen Award nominations, a Canadian Screen Music Award, and multiple Leo Awards. He is one half of a composing duo with his brother Caleb Chan.

== Life and career ==
Chan was raised in Hong Kong and Vancouver, British Columbia. He attended McGill University and holds a Masters in Sound Recording from the Schulich School of Music. Prior to writing music for picture, he was a recording engineer that worked with CBC radio, Vancouver Symphony Orchestra and the Manitoba Chamber Orchestra. His engineering work with Chor leoni was nominated for a Juno award.

As a musician and arranger, Chan has contributed to numerous albums, collaborating with artists such as Jordan Klassen, Dear Rouge and Iamtheliving.

Chan is a board member of the Vancouver International Film Festival (VIFF).

== Selected filmography ==
Year	Title	Note
2020	50 States of Fright	Seasons 1-2
2022	Team Zenko Go	Seasons 1-2
2022	Angry Birds: Summer Madness	Seasons 1-3
2022	Panhandle	Season 1
2022-2023	Pinecone & Pony	Seasons 1-2
2023	The Nature of Things	Season 62, Episode 11
2024	The Thundermans Return	TV film
2024	Alert: Missing Persons Unit	Seasons 2-3
2024	The Fairly OddParents: A New Wish	Season 1
2024-2026	Allegiance	Seasons 1-3
2025	North of North	Season 1
2025	Lego Dreamzzz	Season 3-4
2026	Boston Blues	Season 1
2026	It's Not Like That	Season 1

== Awards and nominations ==
Year	Result	Award	Category	Work	Ref.
2022	Won	Leo Awards	Best Musical Score, Animation Series	Angry Birds: Summer Madness	
2023	Won	Leo Awards	Best Musical Score, Animation Series	Angry Birds: Summer Madness	
2023	Won	Leo Awards	Best Musical Score, TV Movie	A Fabled Holiday	
2023	Nominated	Canadian Screen Awards	Best Original Music, Animation	Team Zenko Go	
2023	Nominated	Canadian Screen Awards	Best Original Music, Animation	Pinecone & Pony	
2024	Nominated	Canadian Screen Awards	Best Original Music, Animation	Pinecone & Pony: "The Sturdy Stone"	
2024	Nominated	Canadian Screen Awards	Best Original Music, Original Song	Builder Brothers Dream Factory	
2025	Nominated	Canadian Screen Awards	Best Original Music, Drama	Allegiance	
2025	Won	Canadian Screen Music Awards	Best Original Score, Comedy Series or Special	North of North	
