= Queen Charlotte: A Bridgerton Story (soundtrack) =

2023 soundtrack album

The soundtrack for the 2023 historical drama limited series Queen Charlotte: A Bridgerton Story, a prequel spin-off of the Netflix series Bridgerton created by Shonda Rhimes, are two projects produced by Sony Music.

The first, Queen Charlotte: A Bridgerton Story (Soundtrack from the Netflix Series), consists of an original score composed and produced by Kris Bowers, while the latter Queen Charlotte: A Bridgerton Story (Covers from the Netflix Series) is an reinterpretation in a classical music key of pop songs from Beyoncé, Alicia Keys, SZA, Dolly Parton and Whitney Houston discography by Bowers with brothers Brian Chan and Caleb Chan.

== Production ==
Kris Bowers, who scored both the first and second seasons of Bridgerton, also worked on two original soundtrack projects for the series through Sony Music. The first one, Queen Charlotte: A Bridgerton Story (Soundtrack from the Netflix Series), was supervised by Bowers, with co-production by Max Wrightson and co-writing of some tracks by Alec Sievern and Michael Dean Parsons.

The idea of the second project, Queen Charlotte: A Bridgerton Story (Covers from the Netflix Series), arose following the filming of the "King's Ball scene", when after a series of songs from the classical repertoire, the director Shonda Rhimes decided to play Alicia Keys' "If I Ain't Got You". The song is the only one with two versions: the first one is instrumental, while the second one is sung by Keys with a 70-piece orchestra of women of colour. Keys explained the creative process and the concept of the project in an interview with Rolling Stone UK:

I spoke to India [Amarteifio] and she was telling me how they'd filmed the King's ball in one particular episode and they had done 30 takes with a very traditional classic song being played. [...] The director announced he wanted to change it up with a modern song and he played "If I Ain't Got You". [...] The director just ended up using that take, even though they did 30 others, and I think that was the beginning of the seed that got planted. I'd never done the song with an orchestra before, so we wanted it to be really meaningful and purposeful. [...] Getting a 70-piece orchestra of women of colour to play is a beautiful extension of that and an opportunity to really just uplift all the incredible musicians who are part of the orchestra. [...] I really wanted to bring a beautiful diversity to the perspective of this idea of royalty, which is already happening naturally in the show

— Alicia Keys on If I Ain't Got You's reinterpretation

The orchestral version of "If I Ain't Got You" arranged by Bobbie-Jane Gardner was accompanied by a music video directed by Keys and Rhimes which features Ofentse Pitse, Rimon, Cherrie, Amel Bent, Delara, and Alicia-Awa Beissert. The video earned a nomination at the 2023 MTV Video Music Awards in the Video for Good category.

== Albums ==
=== Queen Charlotte: A Bridgerton Story (Covers from the Netflix Series) ===
Queen Charlotte: A Bridgerton Story (Covers from the Netflix Series)

Soundtrack album by various artists
- Released: May 4, 2023
- Recorded: 2022–2023
- Genre: Classical; R&B
- Length: 29:29
- Label: Netflix Music; Sony Masterworks
- Producer: Caleb Chan; Brian Chan; Arbel Bedak; Jim McMillen; Kris Bowers; Vitamin String Quartet

Bridgerton soundtracks chronology
Bridgerton Season Two (Soundtrack from the Netflix Series) (2023)	Queen Charlotte: A Bridgerton Story (Covers from the Netflix Series) (2023)

Queen Charlotte: A Bridgerton Story (Covers from the Netflix Series), a compilation soundtrack album for the series was announced in late-February and was released by Netflix Music and Sony Masterworks on May 4, 2023. It provided for the reinterpretation in a classical music key of pop songs from Beyoncé, Alicia Keys, SZA, Dolly Parton and Whitney Houston discography. Keys' 2004 single "If I Ain't Got You" was interpreted into an orchestral version by composer Bobbie-Jane Gardner, that was released by Legacy Recordings on April 28, 2023.

Track listing
No.	Title	Writer(s)	Producer(s)	Length
1.	"A Feeling I've Never Been" (performed by Kris Bowers)	Kris Bowers; Tayla Parx	Kris Bowers	3:44
2.	"Halo" (performed by Caleb Chan and Brian Chan)	Beyoncé Knowles; Ryan Tedder; Evan Bogart	Caleb Chan; Brian Chan	2:53
3.	"If I Ain't Got You" (performed by Vitamin String Quartet)	Alicia Keys	Bowers	3:34
4.	"Déjà Vu" (performed by Mike Froudarakis and Alexander Leeming Froudakis)	Knowles; Rodney Jerkins; Delisha Thomas; Makeba; Keli Nicole Price; Shawn Carter	Bowers	2:20
5.	"Run the World" (performed by Caleb Chan and Brian Chan)	Knowles; Terius "The-Dream" Nash; David Taylor; Wesley Pentz; Adidja Palmer; Nick van de Wall	Caleb Chan; Brian Chan	3:11
6.	"Nobody Gets Me" (performed by Caleb Chan and Brian Chan)	Solána Rowe; Benjamin Levin; Rob Bisel; Carter Lang	Caleb Chan; Brian Chan; Arbel Bedak	4:05
7.	"I Will Always Love You" (performed by Vitamin String Quartet)	Dolly Parton	Bowers	4:45
8.	"If I Ain't Got You – Orchestral" (performed by Alicia Keys and Queen Charlotte's Global Orchestra)	Keys	Bowers	4:54
Total length:				29:29

=== Queen Charlotte: A Bridgerton Story (Soundtrack from the Netflix Series) ===
Queen Charlotte: A Bridgerton Story (Covers from the Netflix Series)

Soundtrack album by Kris Bowers
- Released: May 4, 2023
- Recorded: 2022–2023
- Genre: Classical
- Length: 29:29
- Label: Netflix Music; Sony Masterworks
- Producer: Kris Bowers

Bridgerton soundtracks chronology
Bridgerton Season Two (Covers from the Netflix Series) (2023)	Queen Charlotte: A Bridgerton Story (Covers from the Netflix Series) (2023)

Kris Bowers chronology
Chevalier (Original Motion Picture Soundtrack) (2023)	Queen Charlotte: A Bridgerton Story (Covers from the Netflix Series) (2023)	Haunted Mansion (Original Motion Picture Soundtrack) (2023)

Queen Charlotte: A Bridgerton Story (Soundtrack from the Netflix Series) is the second soundtrack album containing the orchestral score composed by Kris Bowers for the series. It was released by Netflix Music and Sony Masterworks on May 4, 2023.

Track listing
No.	Title	Length
1.	"Main Title"	1:05
2.	"Arranging Marriage"	2:22
3.	"Princess Royal Is Dead"	2:56
4.	"I'm Just George"	2:03
5.	"Rest of Our Lives Together"	1:17
6.	"Kiss and Tell"	1:35
7.	"Observatory Kiss"	1:53
8.	"Who You Are"	3:38
9.	"I Am Venus"	3:48
10.	"Meet Dr. Monro"	3:26
11.	"George Charlotte Montage"	2:31
12.	"Almost Kiss"	1:23
13.	"Almost Break Down"	1:37
14.	"Come Back to Me"	3:41
15.	"I Love You Charlotte"	2:09
16.	"He's Not Fine"	3:21
17.	"Together We Are Whole"	2:44
18.	"Thank You"	2:32
Total length:		44:01

== Charts ==
Chart performance for Queen Charlotte: A Bridgerton Story (Covers from the Netflix Series)
Chart (2023)	Peak position
UK Album Downloads (OCC)	35
UK Soundtrack Albums (OCC)	8
