= Submachine =

Submachine may refer to:

- Submachine gun, a type of automatic firearm
- Submachine (series), a video game series by Mateusz Skutnik
- Submachine, a vehicle from Jamie and the Magic Torch

== See also ==
- Machine
- Submarine, a type of watercraft
- Subsystem, engineering term
- Sunmachine (disambiguation)
