= The Golden Arm =

Folktale

The Golden Arm is a folktale, a story appearing in multiple cultures through oral tradition and folklore, most famously told by Mark Twain and also used by him to instruct others in how to tell a story. The tale begins with a death or a recently deceased victim who has an artificial limb, usually an arm, made of gold. The victim has their limb stolen after their death, most often by a loved one or trusted one in greed. Then the victim comes back from the grave looking to get their golden limb back and scares the robber into giving back their arm.

The Golden Arm is sometimes spoken rather than read and ends with a great shout to scare the listeners.

== Origins ==
The Golden Arm can be documented at least 200 years back, but it has been told orally for longer. This tale is part of the Aarne–Thompson Type 366 which means that a corpse comes back from the dead to claim what was stolen from them, usually a body part, article of clothing or object. This stems from the belief that “a dead man or animal can find no rest until its physical remains are intact.”

The folktale was created originally to teach the listeners to be respectful to the dead. Because The Golden Arm was passed down orally the story changed to become a story about avarice, teaching the listeners to not be greedy.

It is unsure where exactly the folktale started, but many cultures have a variation of The Golden Arm.

== Story ==
From Joseph Jacobs's Collection, English Fairy Tales:

There was once a man who travelled the land all over in search of a wife. He saw young and old, rich and poor, pretty and plain, and could not meet with one to his mind. At last he found a woman, young, fair, and rich, who possessed a right arm of solid gold. He married her at once, and thought no man so fortunate as he was. They lived happily together, but, though he wished people to think otherwise, he was fonder of the golden arm than of all his wife's gifts besides.

At last she died. The husband put on the blackest black, and pulled the longest face at the funeral; but for all that he got up in the middle of the night, dug up the body, and cut off the golden arm. He hurried home to hide his treasure, and thought no one would know.

The following night he put the golden arm under his pillow, and was just falling asleep, when the ghost of his dead wife glided into the room. Stalking up to the bedside it drew the curtain, and looked at him reproachfully.

Pretending not to be afraid, he spoke to the ghost, and said: “What hast thou done with thy cheeks so red?”

“All withered and wasted away,” replied the ghost, in a hollow tone.

“What hast thou done with thy red rosy lips?”

“All withered and wasted away.”

“What hast thou done with thy golden hair?”

“All withered and wasted away.”

“What hast thou done with thy Golden Arm?”

“THOU HAST IT!”

== Variations ==
With The Golden Arm being an orally told folktale, as it was passed down the story changed. The different variations on the story involve usually these three things:

The Limb- Sometimes the limb of the deceased is not an arm (America, England, Tuscany, and Friesland ). On occasion it is a leg (Germany, Schleswig-Holstein, France) or a toe (Texas). Sometimes the origin of how the limb came to be is different. Sometimes the owner is born with the golden limb; sometimes it is an artificial limb to replace an amputation; and sometimes the origin of the limb is left unexplained. The limb is sometimes silver.

The Deceased and the Robber- Usually the folktale has the deceased and the robber having a relationship of some sort, either by marriage, friend or doctor. But on occasion the deceased will have no relation to the robber. Also, the deceased is not always a woman. On occasion the robber is female.

The Ending- Much of the American and English versions of the folktale end with the great shout at the end to scare the listener. But some countries give an end to the tale leaving the reader unsettled (Germany and France).

On a 1964 episode of his television series The Andy Griffith Show called Back To Nature, Andy Griffith's character Sheriff Andy Taylor tells the Golden Arm story to Barney, Gomer, Opie, and a group of children on a camping trip.

== Mark Twain ==
Mark Twain went on a reading tour with George Washington Cable in 1884–1885. During this tour he would constantly feature his "Ghost Stories" where he told the story of The Golden Arm. He would get reactions from the audience that involved jumping in their seats and screaming in fear. In his book How to Tell a Story and Other Essays he references The Golden Arm. It is written in that The Golden Arm is a Negro Ghost story, which he learned from his uncle's slave named Uncle Dan'l, and tells the reader to focus on the pause. He states it is a humorous story, most likely because people's reactions to it are funny, and explains to the reader how to tell the story to get such reactions. He then tells the reader to practice using "The Golden Arm":

On the platform I used to tell a negro ghost story that had a pause in front of the snapper on the end, and that pause was the most important thing in the whole story. If I got it the right length precisely, I could spring the finishing ejaculation with effect enough to make some impressible girl deliver a startled little yelp and jump out of her seat—and that was what I was after. This story was called "The Golden Arm," and was told in this fashion. You can practise with it yourself—and mind you look out for the pause and get it right.

== See also ==
- 50 States of Fright, an anthology series on Quibi that featured this folktale in one of its stories
- The Submachine series echoes this story, along with many other ancient stories and folk legends
