= Boston Blue =

American police procedural television series

- Genre: Police procedural; Crime drama
- Based on: Blue Bloods by: Robin Green; Mitchell Burgess
- Developed by: Brandon Sonnier; Brandon Margolis
- Starring: Donnie Wahlberg; Sonequa Martin-Green; Ernie Hudson; Maggie Lawson; Gloria Reuben; Marcus Scribner; Mika Amonsen
- Theme music composer: Caleb Chan; Brian Chan
- Composers: Caleb Chan; Brian Chan
- Country of origin: United States
- Original language: English
- No. of seasons: 2
- No. of episodes: 26

Production
- Executive producers: Brandon Sonnier; Brandon Margolis; Jerry Bruckheimer; KristieAnne Reed; Donnie Wahlberg; Anthony Hemingway; Pam Veasey
- Production locations: Toronto, Ontario, Canada; Boston, Massachusetts, US
- Production companies: Jerry Bruckheimer Television; The Brandons; CBS Studios

Original release
- Network: CBS
- Release: October 17, 2025 – present

Related
- Blue Bloods

Boston Blue is an American police procedural drama television series that premiered on October 17, 2025, on CBS.

Executive produced by and starring Donnie Wahlberg, the series is a spin-off of Blue Bloods focusing on his character of Danny Reagan, who moves from New York City to Boston and subsequently takes a position at the Boston Police Department alongside his son Sean, who is initially a rookie patrol officer.

CBS ordered Boston Blue direct-to-series in February 2025, inheriting the former Friday-night time slot of Blue Bloods following its series finale. In December 2025, the series was renewed for a second season, which premiered on October 9, 2026.

== Plot ==
Former NYPD detective Danny Reagan takes a position with the Boston Police Department after his younger son Sean, who had joined the BPD amid a hiring freeze in the NYPD, is injured in a fire that was suspected to be a cover-up for a murder. Danny is partnered with Lena Silver, the eldest daughter of a noted police family in that city and a "rising star".

Lena is the granddaughter of Reverend Edwin Peters, described as the renowned pastor of an historic Baptist church in Boston. He is the father of Mae Silver, Boston's District Attorney, and also the grandfather of rookie patrol cop Jonah Silver, who is partnered with Sean. Mae married Ben Silver (now deceased), whose daughter from a previous marriage is Superintendent Sarah Silver, while Mae had Jonah with Ben.

The mixed family typically has a Shabbat meal together at Mae's residence in every episode, often with the Reagans joining, which is a nod to the inclusion of the Sunday dinner at Frank Reagan's house on Blue Bloods.

== Cast and characters ==
=== Main ===
- Donnie Wahlberg as Boston Police (former NYPD) Detective Sergeant Danny Reagan
- Sonequa Martin-Green as Boston Police Detective Lena Silver, daughter of Mae and stepdaughter of Ben Silver, who converts to Judaism in honor of her stepfather in the first season
- Ernie Hudson as Reverend Edwin Peters, a Baptist minister, father to Mae and Jill. Lena and Jonah's grandfather as well as Sarah's stepgrandfather.
- Maggie Lawson as Sarah Silver, Lena's stepsister and Jonah's half-sister who serves as Boston PD's Superintendent of Detectives. She is Ben's older biological child from his first marriage.
- Gloria Reuben as Mae Silver, the Boston District Attorney (officially the District Attorney of Suffolk County, Massachusetts), Jonah and Lena's mother, and Sarah's stepmother. She converted to Judaism when she married Ben.
- Marcus Scribner as Jonah Silver, Sarah and Lena's younger half-brother and son of Mae and Ben. He is a Boston patrol officer partnered with Sean Reagan.
- Mika Amonsen as Sean Reagan, Danny's younger son and a Boston patrol officer partnered with Jonah. Sean moved to Boston to become a fifth generation police officer.

=== Recurring ===
- Kenric Green as Charlie Price, Mae's chief of staff
- Mark MacRae as Denzel
- Mike Vogel as Seth Yates, Sarah's boyfriend turned fiancée
- Matia Jackett as Phoebe Yates, Seth's daughter
- Marisa Ramirez as Detective Maria Baez, Danny's girlfriend and former NYPD partner
- Ryan Broussard as Detective Brian Rodgers, Lena's boyfriend
- Harry Lennix as Judge Elijah Robinson, Mae's love interest
- Xochitl Gomez as Penelope "Penny" Bravo, Sean's girlfriend
- Marg Helgenberger as Gwen Silver (season 2), Sarah's mother
- Eleanor and Penelope Yataco as Elena Baez (season 2), adopted daughter of Maria Baez

=== Guest ===
- Holly Robinson as Jill Evans (season 1), Mae's sister
- Erik King as Chris Williams, Lena's biological father who is a former detective and current small town police chief
- Ron Lea as Chief Lanigan, the Chief of the Boston Police Department and Sarah's boss
- Alisha Wainwright as Christina Reed (season 1 & 2), Lena's half-sister and Chris's daughter
- Russell Yuen as Butch Burnside, a forensic scientist and medical examiner
- Ward Horton as Thad Longfellow, a former Assistant District Attorney and a main political rival and a ruthless tactician opposing Mae Silver
- Tony Nappo as Officer Ray "Ray Ray" Rayford, a Boston police officer
- Ali Hassan as Sgt. Amir Karim (season 1), Jonah and Sean's precinct supervising sergeant
- Nisa Gunduz as Officer Rachel Yolande (season 1), a fellow Boston Police Department patrol officer and a romantic interest for Jonah Silver
- Jack Murray as Ronan Flaherty, a convicted gang member who initially took the fall for murdering Judge Ben Silver
- Sydney Ozerov-Meyer as Sgt. Betina 'Bet' Ryan (season 2), Sean and Jonah's new and direct supervising sergeant

=== Crossover characters from Blue Bloods ===
- Bridget Moynahan as Erin Reagan (season 1), Danny's sister and a New York County Assistant District Attorney
- Len Cariou as Henry Reagan, Danny's grandfather, and retired NYPD Police Commissioner
- Will Hochman as NYPD Detective Joe Hill (season 1), Danny's nephew
- Will Estes as NYPD Lieutenant Jamie Reagan (season 2), Danny's brother

== Episodes ==
=== Series overview ===
| Season | Episodes | Originally released | |
| Season | Episodes | First released | Last released |
|---|---|---|---|
| 1 | 20 | October 17, 2025 | May 22, 2026 |
| 2 | TBA | October 9, 2026 | TBA |

=== Season 1 (2025–2026) ===
| No. overall | No. in season | Title | Directed by | Written by | Original release date | Prod. code | U.S. viewers (millions) |
|---|---|---|---|---|---|---|---|
| 1 | 1 | "Faith and Family" | Anthony Hemingway | Brandon Sonnier & Brandon Margolis | October 17, 2025 | 101 | 4.68 |
On a night out, Boston cops Sean Reagan and Jonah Silver rush into a burning building to rescue survivors. Inside, Sean finds a fatally shot woman before flames engulf them. Prompted by the news, Sean's father, NYPD Detective Danny Reagan flies to Boston and teams up with Jonah's sister, Detective Lena Silver. They investigate the murder of tech CEO Andrea Decker, whose technological company created Boston PD's facial recognition software and was under investigation by DA Mae Silver—Lena and Jonah's mother. A dropped multi-tool leads Danny and Lena to a private investigator who overheard an argument with Decker, pointing them toward former software engineer Marquis Rawlins. After Lena convinces her sister, Lieutenant Sarah Silver, to bypass new facial recognition restrictions, they place Marquis at the scene. Marquis confesses, yet Lena and Danny remain skeptical. During a tense Silver family dinner with Danny and Erin Reagan, Jonah deduces Marquis is covering for someone else. Re-examining the evidence, the team identifies the real killer as Caleb Bruce Jr., motivated by his imprisoned father's vendetta against Decker's software. Jonah catches Caleb at a train station with the murder weapon. Afterward, Danny vows to stay in Boston, and Sean finally wakes up.
| 2 | 2 | "Teammates" | Randy Zisk | Brandon Sonnier & Brandon Margolis | October 24, 2025 | 102 | 4.14 |
After leaving a Red Sox game, Danny and Sean Reagan hear gunshots and find a bound man murdered. DA Mae Silver reveals the victim is whistleblower Winston Ballard, a witness in a Ponzi scheme case against Lou Malakov, and asks Danny and Lena Silver to investigate. Meanwhile, Sean and Jonah Silver struggle through their first shift as partners, while Superintendent Sarah Silver suspends Officer Sylvia Min after her late relief, Officer Todd Raines, left Winston unprotected. During questioning, Malakov is fatally shot by a gunman fleeing in a blue van. Danny and Lena trace the stolen van to a charity run by Malakov's ex-wife, Winnie, where fingerprints identify the suspect as Harold Baca — a man Raines previously released. Sarah discovers Raines was corrupt and paid off by Harold to abandon his post. Danny and Lena intercept Harold at the charity before he can kill Winnie and stage her suicide, with Lena fatally shooting him. Mae subsequently deduces that Winston's widow, Naomi, is Harold's sister and orchestrated the hits after Winston forfeited their fortune. Ultimately, Sean and Jonah overcome their friction to catch a local thief, Sylvia secures a DA's office job, and Danny decides to transfer to Boston PD.
| 3 | 3 | "History" | Alex Zakrzewski | Rebecca Cutter | October 31, 2025 | 103 | 3.84 |
Detectives Danny Reagan and Lena Silver partner with Brian Rodgers of the Drug Control Unit—Lena's former colleague and love interest—to investigate Kathleen Sullivan, found dead in Boston Harbor with branded heroin. They question Kathleen's brother, former CI Patrick "Sully" Sullivan, and track supply to local drug dealer Mitchell Edgars. When Edgars' associate, Tommy "Bones" Johnson, is murdered, Sully is briefly suspected after leaving his medallion at the scene, but a phone selfie proves Edgars was there and killed Bones to send a message. Danny and his tactical team raid Edgars' home, capturing him right before he can shoot Brian, which clears Sully and inspires Lena to give Brian another chance. Meanwhile, Mae Silver prosecutes a sexual assault case involving Harper Roy, a former adult performer turned schoolteacher. Though defense attorneys threaten to expose Harper's past, Mae proves the attacker stalked Harper's videos online, securing a conviction without ruining her career. Elsewhere, Jonah Silver and Sean Reagan follow online scavenger hunt clues during a welfare check, rescuing a trapped missing man named Murray Bennett. Finally, Sarah Silver resolves tensions with her boyfriend's teenage daughter, Phoebe, inviting her to move in together, while Danny ends the night meeting Maria Baez.
| 4 | 4 | "Rites of Passage" | Jackeline Tejada | Pam Veasey | November 7, 2025 | 104 | 4.00 |
Danny Reagan and Lena Silver investigate the murder of antiques dealer Henry Chen, whose body was wrapped in a rug and clutched rare lady slipper orchids. Meanwhile, Sarah Silver handles a bizarre bank heist where a fugitive and a bank teller vanish through historic underground tunnels, which ultimately lead straight to Danny and Lena's active crime scene. Investigating further, Danny and Lena discover that antique store employee Jimmy Holloway secretly partnered with criminal Travis Neil and teller Brenda Moretti in the robbery. When the Reagans raid their hidden warehouse hideout, Travis shoots Jimmy and takes Brenda hostage before Danny carefully disables Travis. Jimmy ultimately survives, and Brenda is safely rescued unharmed and gets arrested. Elsewhere, Mae Silver reviews a contested prison case involving young Elijah Daniels, ultimately granting his exoneration after realizing Ben's original sentence was unjust. Inspired by her family and past talks with Benjamin Silver, Lena decides to fully complete her religious conversion to Judaism, receiving warm support from her grandfather, Reverend Edwin Peters. Finally, following the dangerous warehouse raid, Danny shares a heartfelt moment with Sean and Jonah, making a sincere promise to build a much closer relationship with his son moving forward.
| 5 | 5 | "Suffer the Children" | Antonio Negret | Terri Kopp | November 14, 2025 | 105 | 3.98 |
Sarah Silver investigates a brutal triple murder outside a frozen yogurt shop, quickly tracing the weapon and leading to the arrest of disturbed 16-year-old Kyle Ferguson. Prompted by Mayor Jim Shaw, Sarah pushes Mae to charge Kyle's enabling parents, eventually arresting David and Amy Ferguson for involuntary manslaughter after uncovering faked school disciplinary notes, suppressed warning signs, and neglected psychiatric medication. Meanwhile, Danny Reagan and Lena Silver investigate the murder of Andy Gosher Jr., who was killed after uncovering a cold case tied to a legendary 35-year-old museum art heist. Danny and Lena trace the hidden loot to a storage unit to find it empty and discover that Andy's uncle Clayton killed him during a violent family dispute over the stolen paintings, while also implicating Zachary Alberico in the conspiracy. Elsewhere, Jonah Silver and Sean Reagan bravely help a confused elderly man, Mr. Hicks, from a dangerous rooftop situation, ultimately reuniting him with his estranged son Peter. Following domestic friction and Jonah's roommate offer, Sean and Danny finally clear the air, with Danny agreeing to take over the apartment lease. Finally, Lena confronts her hidden artistic heritage, and Sarah secures a major legal precedent holding negligent parents completely accountable.
| 6 | 6 | "Code of Ethics" | Sherwin Shilati | Terence Paul Winter | November 21, 2025 | 106 | 3.99 |
Sarah Silver and her entire investigative team search for high-end brothel suspects without immediate success, while Danny Reagan celebrates his brand-new apartment with Maria Baez before being called away to a violent home invasion. Investigating the brutal robberies, Danny and Lena Silver discover that neighbourhood watch volunteer Sam Norquist has been hacking security systems to target victims, ultimately leading them to successfully trap and arrest Joe Buckland for fencing the stolen jewellery. Meanwhile, Jonah Silver and Sean Reagan chase Penny Bravo, a former felon whom Sean develops strong romantic feelings for. Encouraged by a heartfelt family chat with Danny, Sean finally resolves to bravely ask Penny out on a proper date. Elsewhere, Mae Silver addresses city money recovery and Sarah meets Mae to pursue a DA office leak, which Sarah shockingly traces the corruption to ADA Philip Beakman—the exact same prosecutor who originally indicted Judge Ben Silver's killer, creating a massive ethical dilemma that could overturn past convictions. Finally, Lena Silver tries to help Remi Wims's brother Yancey avoid serious prison time, but after Yancey stubbornly refuses to leave his dangerous street gang, Lena sadly realizes she cannot bend the strict rules for him.
| 7 | 7 | "Baggage Claim" | Monica Raymund | Dave Metzger | December 5, 2025 | 107 | N/A |
Danny Reagan and Lena Silver investigate the murder of Claire Hayes after Sean Reagan and Jonah Silver discover her dismembered body inside a bleeding suitcase in the park. Lena immediately suspects Senator Lowell, whom she believes got away with a past murder, though Danny insists they need hard evidence. Tracing Claire's hotel records and a nearby construction site, they uncover a bloody crime scene and a hidden camera proving Claire accidentally photographed Lowell with his secret mistress before he killed her. With DNA matching the scene, they finally arrest Lowell for good. Meanwhile, Mae Silver faces a smear campaign from her former prosecutor Teddy Bradford, who leaks an upcoming book and manipulates a podcast interview. Though Mae uncovers damaging personal secrets on Teddy, she takes the high road and refuses to use them against him. Elsewhere, Sarah Silver suspends Officer Joyce Davis for threatening her sister Ava's abusive boyfriend, Carl, before Sarah successfully de-escalates a tense armed hostage standoff involving the couple. Finally, Sean and Jonah arrest a local pickpocket named Eddie, who initially tricks them into settling a personal score before genuinely helping them bust a local street dealer who smuggles drugs inside stuffed leprechauns in the park.
| 8 | 8 | "In the Name of the Father, And of the Son..." | Bridget Moynahan | John Dove | December 12, 2025 | 108 | N/A |
Detectives Danny Reagan and Lena Silver investigate the tragic murder of Matt Miller, who was fatally shot during a staged street robbery while his wife Evelyn fumbled his wallet. Discovering that Evelyn was having a secret extramarital affair with Thomas Baldwin, Danny and Lena leverage a hidden burner phone call to corner her. Reverend Edwin Peters bravely steps into the interrogation room to counsel Evelyn, ultimately convincing her to repent and confess to conspiring with Baldwin to murder her husband. Meanwhile, Jonah Silver and Sean Reagan arrest a drunken firefighter named Bryan, prompting immense tension when local police superiors pressure Sarah Silver to drop all of the criminal charges. Sarah initially pushes back against institutional corruption, though she later uses clever leverage to force the fire department to send Bryan to mandatory rehab. Elsewhere, Jonah bravely confronts his workplace bully over malicious workstation graffiti, but successfully stays completely professional throughout the entire ordeal. Seth Yates sincerely apologizes to Sarah for overreacting about his teenage daughter Phoebe's recent drinking. Finally, after a deeply touching conversation with Edwin, Mae Silver still emotionally acknowledges to Lena that she has always pushed her extremely hard out of deep, protective maternal love and fear.
| 9 | 9 | "Collateral Damage" | Randy Zisk | Estevan | December 19, 2025 | 109 | N/A |
Sarah Silver offers Danny Reagan a permanent Boston Police Department position, forcing him to consider officially retiring from the NYPD. Meanwhile, Danny and Lena Silver investigate the murder of suspended NSA analyst Marty Kane, who was bludgeoned with his own golf club after leaking classified intel. Though initially linked to Russian cyber terrorists, forensic body shimmer oil leads them to a strip club. When dancer Lexi Starr is framed, Danny cleverly obtains DNA from rival dancer Aurora, proving she killed Marty and bears a Russian cyber-terrorist tattoo. Elsewhere, a prosecutor scandal overturns the conviction of Ronan Flaherty, the man who murdered Judge Ben Silver. Devastated and furious, Jonah Silver blames Mae and Sarah for exposing the corruption, straining family ties during Shabbat. Defying warnings from Sean Reagan and grandfather Edwin Peters, Jonah switches patrol routes to confront Ronan, sparking a street brawl that gets him sent home. Desperate to put Ronan back behind bars, Sarah uncovers his hidden ties to the violent Red Saints gang. Later, Jonah disappears and stalks Ronan into an abandoned construction site. Hearing gunshots, Danny, Lena, and Sean rush inside to find Ronan dead and a blood-spattered Jonah standing over him, ending on a shocking cliffhanger.
| 10 | 10 | "Hard Truths" | Jason Hellmann | Jamila Daniel | February 27, 2026 | 110 | N/A |
Jonah Silver is found covered in blood over Ronan Flaherty's body, claiming a mystery shooter killed him. Though Sean Reagan initially lies to back Jonah's story, Danny Reagan catches the deception and takes over the case to avoid a conflict of interest for the Silver family. Ballistics soon clear Jonah and reveal a twist: the bullet that killed Ronan came from the exact same revolver used to murder Judge Ben Silver. Furthermore, footage proves Ben's real killer was left-handed with a burned arm, meaning right-handed Ronan took the fall for someone else. As Jonah and Lena Silver track the revolver's history, Danny and Sean trace a witness in a blue bomber jacket, nicknamed Rabbit, only to see him killed in a car bombing. Fresh DNA and motorcycle evidence identify the bomber and triggerman as Red Saints gang member Doyle O'Keefe. Meanwhile, Mae and Sarah Silver uncover missing trial pages and suppressed DNA, and they find overwhelming evidence that corrupt and influential real estate developer David Laughlin paid O'Keefe to execute the judge. During a tense alley showdown, Doyle disarms Jonah, but Sean shoots Doyle in time to save Jonah's life. With Doyle and Laughlin arrested, the family toasts Ben's memory.
| 11 | 11 | "Family Secrets" | Sudz Sutherland | Pam Veasey | March 6, 2026 | 111 | N/A |
Danny Reagan wakes early to run, preparing for the upcoming Rookie Run. Meanwhile, a violent gun shop robbery leaves former Marine owner Hal Dinsmore dead after he heroically shoots one of the intruders. The investigation uncovers an insider link to Sandborn Shipping employee Allen Cavallo and associate Dylan Camotta. Back at the office, Mae Silver steps in to successfully prosecute a tough court case after a judge's prodding, and the judge, Elijah Robinson, asks Mae out. Fleeing from authorities, Dylan and Allen burst into a local restaurant where Sarah Silver and her boyfriend's daughter, Phoebe, are having dinner. Sarah keeps her phone line open so Lena Silver can guide the police. During the standoff, a hostage shoots and injures Allen. Outside, Danny apprehends Dylan. Following the crisis, Sarah and Phoebe administer first aid, and Sarah fully embraces her role as a stepmother, agreeing to let Phoebe stay in Boston instead of moving to Japan. Elsewhere, Jonah Silver and Sean Reagan investigate an abandoned police stop, discovering the driver was a young man wearing drag whom they gently encourage to come clean to his worried parents. The next day, Danny, Lena, and the boys run the Rookie Run together.
| 12 | 12 | "St. Patrick's Day" | Sudz Sutherland | Terence Paul Winter & Hanna McIntosh | March 13, 2026 | 112 | N/A |
Danny, Sarah, and Lena race to stop a looming threat on St. Patrick's Day. Meanwhile, homesickness sparks a family gathering, and Lena's personal life takes a hopeful turn.
| 13 | 13 | "Beautiful Broken Things" | Richelle Taylor | Dijorn Moss & Trinea Moss | April 3, 2026 | 113 | N/A |
A drive-by shooting at the church pulls Lena and Danny into the complicated past of one of Reverend Peters' associates. Meanwhile, Mae faces painful revelations about her family, the team manages internal friction, and grandfather Henry Reagan comes to visit Danny and Sean.
| 14 | 14 | "Blood Chemistry" | Bosede Williams | Dave Metzger | April 10, 2026 | 114 | N/A |
Sean and Jonah go undercover to track down a dangerous new threat affecting Boston's young adults, forcing Sean to confront unresolved ties from his past along the way. Meanwhile, personal revelations and family concerns surface as the team navigates health scares, and growing public attention brings new challenges.
| 15 | 15 | "For Those Who Weren't Heard" | Brad Turner | John Dove | April 17, 2026 | 115 | N/A |
When an NYPD homicide leads to a dangerous cross‑city case, Danny and Lena reunite with Danny's former partner Maria Baez to uncover the truth and protect a vulnerable victim. Meanwhile, separate investigations test personal loyalties and moral boundaries as the team confronts difficult family dynamics.
| 16 | 16 | "Anatomy of a Bomb" | Randy Zisk | Estevan | April 24, 2026 | 116 | N/A |
When a crisis erupts at a local hospital over a critical transplant error, Danny and Lena work to calm a volatile situation while the rest of the team uncovers a darker mystery tied to the case. Meanwhile, an unexpected encounter pushes Lena to reflect on her past.
| 17 | 17 | "L'Dor Vador" | Anton Cropper | Brandon Sonnier & Elliott Patzkowsky | May 1, 2026 | 117 | N/A |
When a captured serial killer hints at the whereabouts of a missing child, Danny teams up with a familiar ally in a tense race against time. Meanwhile, health scares and long‑kept family secrets surface, forcing members of the team to confront personal truths.
| 18 | 18 | "Personal Foul" | Anton Cropper | Jamila Daniel | May 8, 2026 | 118 | N/A |
When a college basketball star is threatened, Danny and Lena race to protect them while solving a murder. Meanwhile, deeply personal conflicts and moral dilemmas surface, forcing the team to confront difficult truths about loyalty, identity, and justice.
| 19 | 19 | "Chasing Monsters" | Sherwin Shilati | Terri Kopp | May 15, 2026 | 119 | N/A |
A deadly threat strikes close to home, pulling Lena, Danny and the team into an intense investigation that stirs buried grief and tests their resolve. At the same time, Mae faces a political and personal reckoning, prompting a revelation that pushes Lena toward a life-changing decision.
| 20 | 20 | "Patrol" | Sherwin Shilati | Brandon Sonnier & Brandon Margolis | May 22, 2026 | 120 | N/A |
A dangerous investigation collides with pivotal personal and professional decisions, pushing the team to their limits. As the D.A. election draws closer, shifting dynamics and an unexpected incident heighten the urgency and raise new questions for everyone involved.

=== Season 2 (2026) ===
| No. overall | No. in season | Title | Directed by | Written by | Original release date | Prod. code | U.S. viewers (millions) |
|---|---|---|---|---|---|---|---|
| 21 | 1 | "The Crash" | Sherwin Shilati | Brandon Margolis & Brandon Sonnier | October 9, 2026 | 201 | 4.09 |
Danny and Lena try to track down a Boston Strangler copycat killer before he strikes again, with second-year officers Sean and Jonah also helping. Lena follows up on a possible link between the car crash that put Detective Rodgers in the hospital and a powerful family, while Rodgers tries to convince Sarah that he's ready to return to active duty despite his PTSD-related claustrophobia and panic attacks. Danny is reluctant to accept a promotion that would make him Lena's boss.
| 22 | 2 | "Ripple Effect" | Sherwin Shilati | Terence Paul Winter | October 16, 2026 | 202 | N/A |
While meeting in the park with Danny, Maria Baez notices an elderly woman taking photos of Maria's adopted daughter Elena. The investigation into who rammed Detective Rodgers' vehicle leads Danny and Lena to a dangerous biker gang. Mae confronts her political opponent when he accuses Lena of threatening him. Jonah and Sean deal with a new supervisor who is angry after Sean disobeys her direct order in a prostitution case. Rodgers turns in his badge after Sarah refuses to reinstate him, saying he's joining the DEA. Lena pleads with Rodgers, insisting he's still not ready for active duty.
| 23 | 3 | "Fire In the Hole" | Jackeline Tejada | John Dove | October 23, 2026 | 203 | N/A |
Sean and Jonah chase two armed perps into the subway, capturing one. Seconds later, gunshots are heard. In the melee, Officer Jason McGee shoots a black off-duty BPD officer, Tremaine Baker, who came toward him with a gun drawn. McGee swears he didn't see Baker's badge under his jacket, but the public reacts with outrage, calling the shooting racially motivated. Danny and Lena search for the second suspect. Chief Lanigan immediately gives the case to IA, but Sarah continues to investigate to help clear McGee, angering her chief.
| 24 | 4 | "Everything Right Can Still Be Wrong" | Jackeline Tejada | Terri Kopp | October 30, 2026 | TBA | TBD |
When the severed arm and hand of a missing shark conservatory co-owner is found, suspicion falls on a well-known "sharktivist" whose viral video feuds with the deceased earned her lucrative endorsements. But when Danny and Lena investigate, they find a much different motive that leads to another suspect. Elsewhere, Jonah and Sean are drawn into a dispute between elderly neighbors, while Sarah reopens a ten-year old rape case after realizing the man she helped put away might be innocent.
| 25 | 5 | "Blood Diamonds" | Monica Raymund | Brandon Margolis & Brandon Sonnier | November 6, 2026 | TBA | TBD |
Jamie goes to Boston for a conference, and gets drawn into a case with Danny involving stolen diamonds. Mae oversees a difficult case where a gamer prank called "SWATting" results in a man's death by heart attack. Jonah gets digits from a beautiful young woman while out with Sean, only to learn the next day that the woman stole Sean's wallet. Sarah assists her stepgrandfather when some suspicious deaths appear to be linked to one of Reverend Peters' parishioners. Also, Sarah's rabbi refuses to officiate her wedding to Seth when he finds out that only Seth's father is Jewish and that Seth never officially converted to Judaism.
| 26 | 6 | "Bloodlines" | Monica Raymund | Estevan | November 13, 2026 | TBA | TBD |
Seth's daughter Phoebe invites Sarah's mother Gwen to Sarah and Seth's wedding, unaware that mother and daughter have been estranged for years. After finding a dying baby in an alley and resuscitating it, Danny and Lena follow up and find that a single man has fathered children with 16 other surrogates. Elsewhere, Sean and Jonah learn that a fellow patrol officer who missed roll call, Kip DeLuca, is a closeted homosexual and that another officer, who openly admits to taking gray market peptides, has been threatening to out Kip.
| 27 | 7 | "Crisis" | Sherwin Shilati | Terence Paul Winter & Dave Metzger | December 11, 2026 | TBA | TBD |

== Production ==
=== Development ===
On June 4, 2024, Paramount Global co-CEO Brian Robbins said at a shareholder presentation that there were plans for a "franchise extension" of Blue Bloods.

The show was not planned as a Blue Bloods spin-off, but had originally been pitched by writers Brandon Sonnier and Brandon Margolis as a drama titled after the Boston neighborhood Jamaica Plain focused on a transfer from the LAPD to Boston. In February 2025, CBS officially picked up the show straight-to-series for the 2025–26 broadcast season, ordering 20 episodes. On December 3, 2025, CBS renewed the series for a second season.

=== Casting ===
In addition to Wahlberg, CBS also announced the casting of Sonequa Martin-Green as a second lead character in May 2025; the new character Lena Silver was originally referred to in announcements as Lena Peters, which would be the maiden name of her mother's character. In May 2025, Ernie Hudson was cast as a series regular for the series. Hudson had previously appeared on Blue Bloods playing another character in a guest role in 2018 in Season 8. In June 2025, Maggie Lawson, Gloria Reuben, and Marcus Scribner joined the cast in starring roles. In July 2025, Mika Amonsen was cast as a series regular as Danny Reagan's younger son Sean, a recasting of the role played by Andrew Terraciano on the original show. In the same month, Bridget Moynahan joined the cast to reprise her role as Erin as a special guest star and set to direct an episode as well. In November 2025, it was reported that Xochitl Gomez was cast in a recurring capacitiy.

Asked about participation in a possible spin-off, Tom Selleck said he was "open to suggestions because I love Frank Reagan," but added that he did not see the character retiring and going off to a small town.

=== Filming ===
Most of the filming is taking place in Toronto due to financial reasons amid broader challenges in the U.S. filming industry. Wahlberg said he advocated to do at least some filming in Boston, which took place in August 2025 at Fenway Park and Boston Common. "The goal is, let's compromise to get the show made. We'll work outside and do exteriors in Boston, and then you know, in success, perhaps we can come down there and be there full time," he told a Boston radio station.

The second season started filming on July 6, 2026, with it scheduled to be finished on April 30, 2027.

== Release ==
Boston Blue had its world premiere at MIPCOM Cannes on October 12, 2025. The series premiered on CBS on October 17, 2025; it has inherited the Friday 10:00 p.m. ET/PT time slot that Blue Bloods aired in for the majority of its run. The second season premiered on October 9, 2026.

== Reception ==
=== Critical response ===
On the review aggregator website Rotten Tomatoes, the series holds an approval rating of 82% based on 11 critic reviews. Metacritic gave the series a weighted average score of 64 out of 100 based on 9 critics, indicating "generally favorable".

Aramide Tinubu of Variety wrote in her review: "Boston Blue has enormous shoes to fill, considering the 14-year run of Blue Bloods. Yet, in the episodes screened (critics received two for review), it is clear that this new show has the foundation to go all the way." Diedre Johnson of TheWrap wrote in her review: "Despite a new cast and setting, CBS's Boston Blue has all the bones of the original series." Joel Keller of Decider wrote in his review: Boston Blue was eye-rollingly frustrating to watch, because it feels like showrunner Brandon Margolis and his writing staff took every contrived, cliched way to create a spinoff of a hit series they could dream up, making for a story that feels like it came straight from a spinoff episode you might have seen in the 1980s." Kristen Baldwin of Entertainment Weekly wrote in her review: "Sometimes, the best thing a show can do is deliver exactly what the viewers want — nothing more, nothing less. And that's just what CBS does with Boston Blue, the new spinoff of its long-running, much-loved drama, Blue Bloods."

=== Ratings ===
Viewership and ratings per episode of Boston Blue
| No. | Title | Air date | Rating/share (18–49) | Viewers (millions) | DVR (18–49) | DVR viewers (millions) | Total (18–49) | Total viewers (millions) | Ref. |
|---|---|---|---|---|---|---|---|---|---|
| 1 | "Faith and Family" | October 17, 2025 | 0.2/4 | 4.68 | 0.1 | 2.54 | 0.4 | 7.22 | |
| 2 | "Teammates" | October 24, 2025 | 0.2/3 | 4.14 | 0.1 | 2.17 | 0.3 | 6.31 | |
| 3 | "History" | October 31, 2025 | 0.2/2 | 3.84 | 0.1 | 2.33 | 0.3 | 6.17 | |
| 4 | "Rites of Passage" | November 7, 2025 | 0.2/3 | 4.00 | 0.2 | 2.44 | 0.3 | 6.44 | |
| 5 | "Suffer the Children" | November 14, 2025 | 0.2/4 | 3.98 | TBD | TBD | TBD | TBD | |
| 6 | "Code of Ethics" | November 21, 2025 | 0.2/3 | 3.99 | TBD | TBD | TBD | TBD | |
