= Meadow Kingfisher =

Canadian actress

- Born: October 17, 2010 (age 15)
- Occupation: Actress
- Years active: 2021–present

Meadow Kingfisher is a Canadian actress. She is best known for voicing Mel in the animated series Builder Brothers Dream Factory and portraying Young Katara in the live action series Avatar: The Last Airbender.

== Early life ==
Kingfigher grew up in the Sturgeon Lake First Nation to Harlan and Madison Kingfisher. She grew up as a dancer but got involved in acting after her mother responded to an Instagram ad looking for Indigenous talent and submitted a video of her. The casting directors were very impressed and offered acting scenes.

== Career ==
Meadow’s first acting job was a short story and music video called The Meeting Place. She then booked the lead role in a her first feature film, called The Beehive. Her first big role came voicing Mel in the animated series Builder Brothers Dream Factory. She gained nationwide fame portraying a Young Katara in the live action series Avatar: The Last Airbender, much to the delight of her little brother who is a big fan of the show. Most recently she appeared in the hugely successful coming of age film Sgt. Fruit Fly playing Eleanora Smith.

== Filmography ==
=== Film ===
Year	Title	Role	Notes
2023	The Beehive	Rosemary Piers	
2026	Sgt. Fruit Fly	Eleanora Smith	

=== Television ===
Year	Title	Role	Notes
2021	Tribal	Young Casey	Episode; Justice For All
2023	Builder Brothers Dream Factory	Mel	10 episodes
2024	Avatar: The Last Airbender	Young Katara	3 episodes
