= Mika Amonsen =

Canadian actor

- Born: Ontario, Canada
- Occupation: Actor
- Years active: 2017–present

Mika Amonsen is an Canadian actor most known for his role as Patrol Officer Sean Reagan in the CBS crime drama Boston Blue, as well as his appearances on Reacher and in the film Thanksgiving.

== Early life ==
Amonsen grew up in a small town outside of Toronto, and was raised in an artistic family. His mother is a dancer and his father is a rock music enthusiast. Mika picked up the guitar at age 13 and soon started playing in a band that eventually recorded an album and opened for name acts in Canada like Kim Mitchell. In college, Amonsen shifted his focus to acting, enrolling in classes and eventually training at Armstrong Acting Studios in Toronto.

== Career ==
After making appearances in TV series such as Designated Survivor, Suits, Reacher and The Republic of Sarah, Amonsen got his big break when he was cast as Lonnie in the Eli Roth film Thanksgiving. In 2025, he was cast to play the character Sean Reagan in the CBS police procedural Boston Blue, reprising the role originally played by Andrew Terraciano on Blue Bloods who now follows his family’s law enforcement legacy as a Boston PD patrol officer.

Amonsen currently resides outside Toronto.

== Filmography ==
=== Film ===
Year	Title	Role	Notes	Ref.
2017	Porcupine Lake	Nick		
2017	Christmas Encore	Brady	TV movie	
2019	Midway	Nautilus Soldier #1		
2021	Danger Next Door	Teenage Boy	TV movie	
2023	Thanksgiving	Lonnie		
2025	Whistle	Tanner Church		
2025	Fresh Meat	Marcus		

=== Television ===
Year	Title	Role	Notes	Ref.
2017	Designated Survivor	Second Soldier	Episode: "Home"	
2018	Suits	Drake Johnson	Episode: "Bad Man"	
2019	Wayne	Luke	Episode: “Chapter Five: Del”	
2019	Slasher	Jock	Episode: “9am to 12pm”	
2019	Good Witch	Jacob	Episode: “The Grey-cation”	
2019	Impulse	Keith	Episode: “Mind on Fire”	
2019	Hudson & Rex	Adler Cullen	2 episodes	
2019	Dare Me	Gregory Prine	Episode: “Coup D’Etat”	
2021	The Republic of Sarah	Hunter Trumbull	3 episodes	
2021	Murdoch Mysteries	Donovan Kent	Episode: “I Know What You Did Last Autumn”	
2022	Reacher	Officer Ribidoux	Episode: "No Apologies"	
2022	Ezra	Nathaniel Walton	2 episodes	
2023	The Spencer Sisters	Lee	Episode: “The Coder’s Calamity”	
2024	Pachinko	American G.I.	Episode: “Chapter Thirteen”	
2025–present	Boston Blue	Officer Sean Reagan	Main cast	
