= Music of Bridgerton =

Soundtracks for the Netflix television series

The music for the historical fiction-romance streaming television series Bridgerton, based on the novel series of the same name by Julia Quinn, features an orchestral and classical score composed and produced by Kris Bowers and orchestral covers of contemporary popular music, performed by Vitamin String Quartet, Duomo, and Bowers himself. Both the soundtrack and covers were released in the course of the series' premiere, with the first season's album being distributed by Lakeshore Records and the subsequent albums distributed by Capitol Records. The music has received critical acclaim and award nominations, and the albums have debuted high on several Billboard charts.

== Background ==
Director and executive producer Julie Anne Robinson said she was inspired by the use of classic rock songs in A Knight's Tale (2001). Showrunner Chris Van Dusen described the musical selection by saying, "It really goes to the idea of making this feel different than your other period shows. Whether it's music or the world of the show, the scripts, the sets, the costumes; it all comes back to infusing things through our own unique modern lens and making things feel relatable to whoever's watching." Van Dusen brought in the Vitamin String Quartet from Los Angeles to cover the tracks because he wanted the music to feel modern, especially for the ball sequences.

Bowers started working on the score right after Mrs. America (2020), with the musicians performing and recording the score remotely due to the COVID-19 pandemic. He used a "trial and error" approach, as he originally planned on making the orchestral elements sound like they had been sampled by producing in a hip hop or pop style. He felt it did not work and instead tried a traditional classical approach, while trying to keep the music feeling modern.

While zeroing in on Simon and Daphne's theme, he used a ravel piano to capture the this classical but modern feeling, which he felt made sense as the story followed the younger generation of that period. The theme showed an array of emotions, which Bowers had described as:

"In the beginning, it has this mysterious, somewhat longing feeling to it. It’s very dramatic, romantic and a bit darker. By the middle of the season, it starts to feel ambivalent when she discovers the truth behind what the Duke has told her. It feels ambiguous or unsettled. Towards the end, it’s triumphant, warm and much more optimistic, especially in the very last scene. That last scene mirrors one of the only times where we heard it optimistic when they make that pact. It’s the only time we hear the theme bright and happy, aside from episode one."

The theme for Lady Whistledown (voiced by Julie Andrews) was described as "harder to crack" as every time writing, it felt too proper and did not "have the bite and sass and edge". He tried over six iterations for the theme until finalising the seventh one. In the original score he had a cue from A Clockwork Orange (1972), which could not used in the show, so it was replaced with the song "What Women Do Best."

== Score albums ==
The score for the first season was released by Lakeshore Records on December 25, 2020, on the show's premiere. The second season's score was released by Capitol Records on March 25, 2022.

=== Track listing ===
Bridgerton: Season 1 (Soundtrack from the Netflix Series)
No.	Title	Length
1.	"Flawless My Dear"	1:43
2.	"The Latest Whistledown"	1:34
3.	"We Could Form an Attachment"	3:07
4.	"Shock and Delight"	4:02
5.	"Simon and Lady Danbury"	4:42
6.	"What Women Do Best"	2:47
7.	"Call Me Simon"	0:58
8.	"Sommerset House"	1:05
9.	"When You Are Alone"	2:46
10.	"Feeling Exceptional"	3:10
11.	"What You Saw Was a Lie"	5:15
12.	"The Duel"	7:13
13.	"A Love Based on Friendship"	4:19
14.	"All is Fair in Love and War"	2:20
15.	"Miserable Together, Happy Apart"	3:34
16.	"Come With Me"	2:27
17.	"One Last Dance"	2:44
18.	"Love is a Choice"	2:20
19.	"A Grand Finish"	3:33
Total length:		59:39

Bridgerton: Season 2 (Soundtrack from the Netflix Series)
No.	Title	Length
1.	"Sharpening My Knives"	2:24
2.	"Accidental Eavesdropping"	2:18
3.	"The Real Work Begins"	1:39
4.	"A Gift For Edwina"	1:01
5.	"Lord Bridgerton Stung"	1:30
6.	"Game Over"	1:14
7.	"A Country Visit"	1:19
8.	"Hearts and Flowers Ball"	1:22
9.	"Nothing Could Keep Me Away"	1:18
10.	"They Are Betrothed"	1:10
11.	"Eloise & Theo"	0:47
12.	"Not Far Enough"	2:12
13.	"To Wait"	1:08
14.	"Happy Endings Don't Exist"	1:38
15.	"Choices"	2:41
16.	"It's My Fault"	3:51
17.	"I Love You"	2:07
18.	"It Has Been Said"	2:31
19.	"Newlyweds"	2:03
Total length:		34:13

Bridgerton: Season 3 (Soundtrack from the Netflix Series)
No.	Title	Length
1.	"Bridgerton Main Title"	1:04
2.	"Something Different"	2:18
3.	"Friend..."	3:34
4.	"Can't You See We're Busy"	2:27
5.	"How Could I Forget"	1:00
6.	"A Moment"	0:37
7.	"Attempts To Flirt"	1:24
8.	"Whispers"	1:20
9.	"An Eye For Jewels"	4:14
10.	"Never Been Kissed"	2:17
11.	"A Practical Match"	0:52
12.	"A Surprise"	2:10
13.	"All Will Be Well"	0:43
14.	"Proposed Out of Love"	1:23
15.	"Since We Met"	1:30
16.	"Shall You Try to Speak to the Queen?"	1:09
17.	"Intrigued"	1:00
18.	"What Good Am I to You?"	2:51
19.	"Could It Be?"	2:31
20.	"Jealous"	1:50
21.	"Asking Permission"	1:37
22.	"The Real Whistledown"	1:27
23.	"Join Me"	1:44
24.	"I Wish You the Best"	0:52
Total length:		42:08

Bridgerton: Season 4 (Soundtrack from the Netflix Series)
No.	Title	Length
1.	"Ms. Wilson Runs the Show"	1:01
2.	"Begin How It Begins"	2:49
3.	"Beaming With Joy"	2:04
4.	"A Simple Dance Lesson"	4:26
5.	"Well Disguised"	2:31
6.	"Lovely Day For a Promenade"	3:48
7.	"Lord Penwood's Promise"	1:06
8.	"Incapable of Leisure"	1:38
9.	"Surprise Lake Encounter"	3:02
10.	"Eager To Find a Wife"	1:18
11.	"Please Don't Go"	1:29
12.	"Just Right"	1:40
13.	"I Am The Tea"	2:16
14.	"It's You I Want"	1:39
15.	"Every Moment"	1:55
16.	"Inspired"	0:57
17.	"Love Or Envy"	0:54
18.	"In Memory of John"	1:21
19.	"A Mother's Wish"	1:45
20.	"Will You Join Me?"	2:15
Total length:		40:03

=== Chart performance ===
Weekly chart performance for Bridgerton: Season 1 (Soundtrack from the Netflix Series)
Chart (2021)	Peak position
UK Album Downloads (OCC)	35
UK Soundtrack Albums (OCC)	14

Weekly chart performance for Bridgerton: Season 2 (Soundtrack from the Netflix Series)
Chart (2022)	Peak position
Australian Albums (ARIA)	37
Austrian Albums (Ö3 Austria)	23
Belgian Albums (Ultratop Flanders)	34
Belgian Albums (Ultratop Wallonia)	86
Danish Albums (Hitlisten)	26
Dutch Albums (Album Top 100)	92
New Zealand Albums (RMNZ)	33
Spanish Albums (Promusicae)	56
Swiss Albums (Schweizer Hitparade)	28
UK Soundtrack Albums (OCC)	36

Weekly chart performance for Bridgerton: Season 4 (Soundtrack from the Netflix Series)
Chart (2026)	Peak position
UK Compilation Albums (Official Charts)	84
US Top Classical Crossover Albums (Billboard)	3

== Soundtrack albums ==
Bridgerton: Season 1 (Covers from the Netflix Series) featured selections of songs from Ariana Grande, Billie Eilish, Shawn Mendes, Taylor Swift, Celeste, and Maroon 5, picked by the music supervisor Alexandra Patsavas. The first four songs were covered by the Vitamin String Quartet. Celeste's "Strange" was covered by Bowers, the show's composer, along with his friend Hillary Smith, and Swift's "Wildest Dreams" was performed by Axel Tenner (known by his stage name Duomo). The soundtrack was released by Lakeshore Records in a six-track extended play on December 25, 2020, alongside the show's premiere.

The covers for the second season were released in conjunction with the premiere on March 25, 2022, alongside the score album. Capitol Records distributed the score and soundtrack. Some of the covers featured songs from Nirvana, Madonna, Rihanna, Miley Cyrus, Harry Styles, Pink, Robyn, Alanis Morissette and Lata Mangeshkar. The tracks were covered by Hannah V, Joe Rodwell, Steve Horner, Kiris Houston, Tomas Peire-Serrte and Midnite String Quartet, along with return appearances from Vitamin String Quartet, Bowers and Duomo, who covered the contemporary songs for the first season's soundtrack. The soundtrack was released in two-disc 180 gram LP record on December 9, 2022, which contained Bower's score in one of the discs.

The third season's soundtrack was released in June 2024. On January 28, 2026, ahead of the first episode of season four, the track listing for the first part of the season was released.

=== Track listing ===
Bridgerton: Season 1 (Covers from the Netflix Series)
No.	Title	Original artist	Length
1.	"Thank U, Next" (Vitamin String Quartet)	Ariana Grande	3:26
2.	"Girls Like You" (Vitamin String Quartet)	Maroon 5	3:23
3.	"In My Blood" (Vitamin String Quartet)	Shawn Mendes	3:30
4.	"Bad Guy" (Vitamin String Quartet)	Billie Eilish	3:13
5.	"Strange" (Kris Bowers feat. Hillary Smith)	Celeste	3:18
6.	"Wildest Dreams" (Duomo)	Taylor Swift	3:23
Total length:			20:13

Bridgerton: Season 2 (Covers from the Netflix Series)
No.	Title	Original artist	Length
1.	"Stay Away" (Vitamin String Quartet)	Nirvana	3:07
2.	"Material Girl" (Kris Bowers)	Madonna	4:04
3.	"Diamonds" (Hannah V and Joe Rodwell)	Rihanna	1:56
4.	"Dancing On My Own" (Vitamin String Quartet)	Robyn	4:39
5.	"You Oughta Know" (Duomo and Tomas Peire-Serrate)	Alanis Morissette	2:47
6.	"Kabhi Khushi Kabhie Gham" (Kris Bowers)	Lata Mangeshkar	3:28
7.	"Sign of the Times (Stripped)" (Steve Horner)	Harry Styles	2:39
8.	"What About Us" (Duomo)	Pink	4:51
9.	"How Deep Is Your Love" (Kiris Houston)	Calvin Harris	3:46
10.	"Wrecking Ball" (Midnite String Quartet)	Miley Cyrus	3:53
Total length:			35:10

Bridgerton: Season 3 (Covers from the Netflix Series)
No.	Title	Original artist	Length
1.	"abcdefu" (Vitula)	Gayle	2:53
2.	"Dynamite" (Vitamin String Quartet)	BTS	3:18
3.	"Jealous" (Shimmer)	Nick Jonas	3:33
4.	"Cheap Thrills" (Vitamin String Quartet)	Sia	3:28
5.	"Happier Than Ever" (Vitamin String Quartet)	Billie Eilish	4:45
6.	"Snow on the Beach" (Atwood Quartet)	Taylor Swift	4:12
7.	"Give Me Everything" (Archer Marsh)	Pitbull	2:12
8.	"pov" (Strings From Paris)	Ariana Grande	3:27
9.	"Thunder" (Thomas Mercier, Théo Croix)	Imagine Dragons	3:07
10.	"Confident" (Archer Marsh)	Demi Lovato	3:00
11.	"Yellow" (Vitamin String Quartet)	Coldplay	3:38
12.	"You Belong with Me" (Duomo)	Taylor Swift	4:01
13.	"Lights" (Archer Marsh)	Ellie Goulding	2:08
14.	"All I Want" (Kris Bowers)	Tori Kelly	3:07
Total length:			46:53

Bridgerton: Season 4 (Covers from the Netflix Series)
No.	Title	Original artist	Length
1.	"Life in Technicolor" (Vitamin String Quartet)	Coldplay	2:56
2.	"DJ Got Us Fallin' in Love" (Strings From Paris)	Usher	3:22
3.	"Never Let You Go" (Vitamin String Quartet)	Third Eye Blind	3:31
4.	"Enchanted" (Joseph William Morgan)	Taylor Swift	3:55
5.	"All I Wanted" (Vitamin String Quartet)	Paramore	3:20
6.	"Bad Idea Right?" (Caleb Chan)	Olivia Rodrigo	3:00
7.	"360" (Peter Gregson)	Charli XCX	2:11
8.	"Birds of a Feather" (GEMINI STRINGS)	Billie Eilish	3:20
9.	"Lose Control" (Vitamin String Quartet)	Teddy Swims	3:30
10.	"Just What I Needed" (Altum Quartet, Berlin Session Strings)	The Cars	3:45
11.	"Fields of Gold" (Music Lab Collective)	Sting	2:30
12.	"Never Be the Same" (Strings From Paris)	Camila Cabello	3:45
13.	"The Night We Met" (Joni Fuller)	Lord Huron	3:28
Total length:			42:38

=== Chart performance ===
Weekly chart performance for Bridgerton: Season 1 (Covers from the Netflix Series)
Chart (2021)	Peak position
Belgian Albums (Ultratop Flanders)	132
Belgian Albums (Ultratop Wallonia)	182
UK Compilation Albums (OCC)	8
UK Album Downloads (OCC)	8
UK Soundtrack Albums (OCC)	3
US Soundtrack Albums (Billboard)	10

Weekly chart performance for Bridgerton: Season 2 (Covers from the Netflix Series)
Chart (2022)	Peak position
UK Compilation Albums (OCC)	4
UK Album Downloads (OCC)	3
UK Soundtrack Albums (OCC)	2
US Soundtrack Albums (Billboard)	20

Weekly chart performance for Bridgerton: Season 3 (Covers from the Netflix Series)
Chart (2024)	Peak position
Austrian Albums (Ö3 Austria)	67
Belgian Albums (Ultratop Flanders)	28
Belgian Albums (Ultratop Wallonia)	126
Hungarian Albums (MAHASZ)	35

Weekly chart performance for Bridgerton: Season 4 (Covers from the Netflix Series)
Chart (2026)	Peak position
Belgian Albums (Ultratop Flanders)	145
UK Album Downloads (Official Charts)	26
UK Soundtrack Albums (Official Charts)	21
US Soundtrack Albums (Billboard)	14
US Top Classical Albums (Billboard)	2
US Top Classical Crossover Albums (Billboard)	2

== Accolades ==
Year	Award	Category	Nominees	Result	Ref.
2021	Golden Reel Awards	Outstanding Achievement in Sound Editing – Music Score and Musical for Episodic Long Form Broadcast Media	Brittany DuBay (for "Shock and Delight")	Nominated	
2021	Hollywood Music in Media Awards	Best Original Score in a TV Show/Limited Series	Kris Bowers	Nominated	
2021	Primetime Creative Arts Emmy Awards	Outstanding Music Composition for a Series (Original Dramatic Score)	Kris Bowers (for "Diamond Of The First Water")	Nominated	
2021	Primetime Creative Arts Emmy Awards	Outstanding Original Main Title Theme Music	Kris Bowers and Michael Dean Parsons	Nominated	
2021	Primetime Creative Arts Emmy Awards	Outstanding Music Supervision	Alexandra Patsavas (for "Diamond Of The First Water")	Nominated	
2022	Black Reel Awards	Outstanding Music Supervision	Alexandra Pastvas	Nominated	
2022	Black Reel Awards	Outstanding Musical Score	Kris Bowers	Nominated	
2022	Grammy Awards	Best Score Soundtrack for Visual Media	Kris Bowers	Nominated	
2022	MTV Movie & TV Awards	Best Musical Moment	Anthony and Kate dancing to Midnight String Quartet's cover of "Wrecking Ball"	Nominated	
2023	NAACP Image Awards	Outstanding Soundtrack/Compilation Album	Bridgerton Season Two (Soundtrack from the Netflix Series) (by Kris Bowers)	Nominated	

== See also ==
- Queen Charlotte: A Bridgerton Story (soundtrack)
- The Unofficial Bridgerton Musical
