= Sketches from an Island 2 =

Studio album by Mark Barrott
- Released: 1 July 2016
- Genre: Balearic beat; downtempo
- Length: 43:43
- Label: International Feel
- Producer: Mark Barrott

Mark Barrott chronology
Bush Society (2015)	Sketches from an Island 2 (2016)

Sketches from an Island 2 is the second studio album of British producer Mark Barrott, released on 1 July 2016 by the International Feel label. The record is a follow-up to Sketches from an Island (2014), a record based on Barrott's experiences living in Ibiza. Sketches from an Island 2 is a balearic downtempo album with the same concept, and was also produced by Barrott with the same equipment used for making Sketches from an Island. Sketches from an Island 2 garnered generally favorable reviews from music journalists, some reviewers spotlighting its musical style.

== Background and production ==
When interviewed about his life and his debut studio album Sketches from an Island (2014) in March 2016, Mark Barrott said that he was not willing to make another record influenced by his experiences living in Ibiza: "If I was banned from making another field recording, I’d be good for 20 years. You want Barcelona airport? Bora Bora sunset? Tokyo bullet train station? The interior of a fucking boat? I’ve got enough." Barrott was "about as interested [...] in doing another Sketches record as [he was] in eating cat shit raw.”

Barrott used money from the sales of Sketches from an Island to buy more music equipment for his next LP. However, this led him to be more focused on purchasing music production products than actually creating new tracks. In the winter of 2016, he got rid of the equipment he bought and only used a slide guitar, a small-sized MIDI keyboard and a laptop for making his next album as he did in producing Sketches from an Island. As Barrott recalled, "it became about the music[,] not the equipment and everything happened really quickly". When Barrott starting working on Sketches from an Island 2, he originally planned it to be an extended play with a concept representing a Thursday where Barrott was DJing at La Torre, a municipality in Cap Negret, Ibiza. The day began with Barrott eating with a friend and going to Dieters, the recording place of Barrott's first album, before going to La Torre. Barrott "just kept on writing and writing, and the EP became the album".

== Composition ==
Labeled by a reviewer for NPR Music as a "soundtrack to nature as a psychedelic trip", Sketches from an Island 2 is a balearic downtempo record with more of a "relaxed mood" than its predecessor, according to Resident Advisor. The Ibiza island concept is also symbolized by what Pitchfork critic Andy Beta described as the album's "beautiful, spare melodicism". He wrote that "Forgotten Island" and "One Slow Thought", the album's final two cuts, were the most "evocative" works in Barrott's discography to date. He analyzed that "Over at Dieter's Place" uses instruments and sounds such as a pedal steel guitar, a mbira, birdcall, woodwinds, and a hand drum to "render" Ibiza's "bucolic miniatures" that Cluster, a group that musician Dieter Moebius was a part of, emulated in their works.

The Arts Desk and the Financial Times spotlighted Sketches from an Island 2's "rich" combination of genres; "Der Stern, Der Nie Vergeht" (English: “the star that never fades”) is an ambient krautrock track, its instrumentation consisting of a talking drum, a fretless bass guitar, and a digital synthesizer lead melody that mimics an analog synth texture. "Cirrus & Cumulus" has a "mesmerising minimalist melody" over "bird song and electronic drones". Beta noted that some tracks contains elements of musical styles and artists that the balearic genre is commonly associated with; these include the "stiff swing" of production music on “Brunch With Suki” and the guitars of “Driving To Cap Negret” that the reviewer compared to the works of Chris Rea and Andreas Vollenweider. Resident Advisor wrote that some parts on the record, like the mallet and strings on "Over at Dieter's Place", are reminiscent of styles like new wave. Elements of gamelan music on “Cirrus & Cumulus” and "Over At Dieter's Place" are also present.

== Critical reception ==
Professional ratings
Review scores
Source	Rating
AllMusic	3.5/5 stars
The Arts Desk	4/5 stars
Financial Times	4/5 stars
The Irish Times	3/5 stars
Pitchfork	8/10
Pretty Much Amazing	A-
Resident Advisor	3.8/5
Spectrum Culture	3.25/5 stars

Sketches from an Island 2 received favorable reviews from critics. Allmusic journalist Timothy Monger wrote that it had "enchanting, easily digestible rhythmic soundscapes that recall the golden era of pre-gift shop new age music" at best, but also contained tracks like "Brunch with Suki" and "Driving to Cap Negret" that "feel a bit more like Ibeza hangover helpers and pass by without much notice" at worst. He called the record a "winsome set" overall. Andy Beta of Pitchfork praised the album as one of the few "sequel" albums ever released to "improve" its predecessor, while Resident Advisor's called the album a "welcome reprise" of Sketches from an Island, his only criticism being the record is too similar to the previous album. The Arts Desk reviewer Barney Harsent suggested Barrott's previous experiences living in places other than Ibiza, such as Germany, France and Uruguay, strongly contributed to the quality of the album. Harsent wrote that the album "remains as convincing an argument for embracing other cultures as I can imagine."

== Track listing and credits ==
All tracks written and produced by Mark Barrott, mixed by Lopazz and mastered by Lewis Hopkins. Cover art illustrated by Stevie Anderson.

Sketches from an Island 2 – Standard version
No.	Title	Length
1.	"Brunch With Suki"	3:44
2.	"Over At Dieter’s Place"	3:20
3.	"Driving To Cap Negret"	4:27
4.	"Winter Sunset Sky"	5:22
5.	"Distant Storms At Sea"	6:10
6.	"Cirrus & Cumulus"	5:10
7.	"Der Stern, Der Nie Vergeht"	5:45
8.	"Forgotten Island"	2:54
9.	"One Slow Thought"	6:51
Total length:		43:43

== Release history ==
Region	Date	Format(s)	Label
Worldwide	1 July 2016	Digital download; vinyl; CD	International Feel
