= Wallace Smith (actor) =

American actor

- Born: Santa Monica, California
- Occupations: Actor, singer
- Years active: 2002–present

Wallace Smith is an American actor and singer. He's best known for his performances in Broadway musicals, including his principal roles in The Lion King, Godspell, and Hamilton. He also had a starring role on the television series Panhandle (2022) and a recurring role in Black Lightning season four (2021).

== Acting credits ==
=== Theatre ===
Year(s)	Production	Role	Venue	Notes
2002–2004	Miss Saigon	John Thomas	Various	US National Tour
2005–2007	The Lion King	Adult Simba	Various	US National Tour
2007–2008	The Lion King	Adult Simba	Minskoff Theatre	Broadway
2009–2010	Ragtime	Ensemble u/s Coalhouse Walker Jr	Neil Simon Theatre	Broadway
2010	Hair	Hud	Al Hirschfeld Theatre	Broadway
2010–2011	American Idiot	Ensemble	St. James Theatre	Broadway
2012	Godspell	John the Baptist / Judas Iscariot	Circle in the Square Theatre	Broadway
2012	Pippin	The Leading Player	Kansas City Repertory Theatre	Regional
2013	Choir Boy	Bobby Marrow	New York City Center	Off-Broadway
2014	Rocky the Musical	Apollo's Manager / Fight Promoter / Disc Jockey	Winter Garden Theatre	Broadway
2015–2016	Les Misérables	Enjolras	Imperial Theatre	Broadway
2016–2018	Hamilton	Hercules Mulligan / James Madison	CIBC Theatre	Original Chicago Company
2018–2020	Hamilton	Hercules Mulligan / James Madison	Richard Rodgers Theatre	Broadway
2021–2022	Hamilton	Hercules Mulligan / James Madison	Hollywood Pantages Theatre	Los Angeles Company
2026	Hamilton	Hercules Mulligan / James Madison	Richard Rodgers Theatre	Broadway

=== Filmography ===
Year(s)	Production	Role	Notes
2003	American Dreams	Phillips	Episode: "Rescue Me"
2013	Blue Bloods	Officer Ritter	Episode: "Framed"
2014	Person of Interest	Pilot	Episode: "4C"
2015	Elementary	ESU Officer #1	Episode: "The Illustrious Client"
2016	Easter Mysteries	Jesus	Film
2016	BrainDead	Sergeant at Arms	Episode: "Wake Up Grassroots: The Nine Virtues of Participatory Democracy, and How We Can Keep America Great by Encouraging an Informed Electorate"
2016	The Night Of	Holding Cell Inmate	Episode: "The Art of War"
2017	The New Edition Story	Jeff Dyson	Miniseries; 3 episodes
2018	Chicago Med	Keith	Episode: "Ties That Bind"
2021	Black Lightning	Detective Hassan Shakur	10 episodes
2022	Panhandle	Dr. Otis Wright	8 episodes
