= 50 States of Fright =

- Genre: Horror
- Composers: Caleb Chan; Brian Chan; Christopher Young
- No. of seasons: 2
- No. of episodes: 24

Production
- Executive producers: Barry Barclay; Floris Bauer; Tommy Coriale; Deborah Liebling; Chris Mangano; Sam Raimi
- Producers: Tony DiSanto; David Magee; Van Toffler; Shawn Williamson; Cody Zwieg
- Running time: Less than 10 minutes
- Production companies: Gunpowder & Sky; DiGa Vision; Pod3 Productions

Original release
- Network: Quibi
- Release: April 6 – October 1, 2020

50 States of Fright is a horror anthology television series that debuted on Quibi on April 6, 2020, for pre-signed up users and on April 13 for the general public.

== Premise ==
The series features self-contained scary stories, each located in a different state of the United States. To fit Quibi's format, each story was spread across two or three episodes.

== Cast ==
- "The Golden Arm (Michigan)"
  - Rachel Brosnahan as Heather
  - Travis Fimmel as David
  - John Marshall Jones as Andy
- "America's Largest Ball of Twine (Kansas)"
  - Ming-Na Wen as Susan
  - Karen Allen as Sheriff Stallings
  - Thailey Roberge as Amelia
- "Scared Stiff (Oregon)"
  - James Ransone as Sebastian Klepner
  - Emily Hampshire as Megan Bloom
- "Grey Cloud Island (Minnesota)"
  - Asa Butterfield as Brandon Boyd
  - Alex Fitzalan as Ashley Whitmore
- "Almost There (Iowa)"
  - Taissa Farmiga as Hannah
  - Ron Livingston as Blake
- "13 Steps to Hell (Washington)"
  - Lulu Wilson as Mallory
  - Rory Culkin as Older Aiden / Storyteller
- "Red Rum (Colorado)"
  - Jacob Batalon as Simon
  - Victoria Justice as Logan
  - Colin Ford as Kyle
  - Christina Ricci as Bitsy
- "Dogwood-Azalea (Missouri)"
  - Elizabeth Reaser as Sara

== Episodes ==
Season	Episodes	Originally released	
Season	Episodes	First released	Last released
1	14	April 6, 2020	April 22, 2020
2	10	September 28, 2020	October 1, 2020

=== Season 1 (2020) ===
No. overall	No. in season	Title	Directed by	Written by	Original release date
1	1	"The Golden Arm (Michigan) – Part 1"	Sam Raimi	Sam Raimi & Ivan Raimi	April 6, 2020
2	2	"The Golden Arm (Michigan) – Part 2"	Sam Raimi	Sam Raimi & Ivan Raimi	April 6, 2020
3	3	"The Golden Arm (Michigan) – Part 3"	Sam Raimi	Sam Raimi & Ivan Raimi	April 6, 2020
4	4	"America's Largest Ball of Twine (Kansas) – Part 1"	Yoko Okumura	S : Yoko Okumura & Mae Catt; T : Mae Catt	April 7, 2020
5	5	"America's Largest Ball of Twine (Kansas) – Part 2"	Yoko Okumura	S : Yoko Okumura & Mae Catt; T : Mae Catt	April 8, 2020
6	6	"America's Largest Ball of Twine (Kansas) – Part 3"	Yoko Okumura	S : Yoko Okumura & Mae Catt; T : Mae Catt	April 9, 2020
7	7	"Scared Stiff (Oregon) – Part 1"	Ryan Spindell	Ryan Spindell & Jacob Motz	April 13, 2020
8	8	"Scared Stiff (Oregon) – Part 2"	Ryan Spindell	Ryan Spindell & Jacob Motz	April 14, 2020
9	9	"Grey Cloud Island (Minnesota) – Part 1"	Adam Schindler & Brian Netto	Adam Schindler & Brian Netto	April 15, 2020
10	10	"Grey Cloud Island (Minnesota) – Part 2"	Adam Schindler & Brian Netto	Adam Schindler & Brian Netto	April 16, 2020
11	11	"Grey Cloud Island (Minnesota) – Part 3"	Adam Schindler & Brian Netto	Adam Schindler & Brian Netto	April 17, 2020
12	12	"Destino (Florida) – Part 1"	Alejandro Brugués	S : Eduardo Sánchez; T : Gregg Hale	April 20, 2020
13	13	"Destino (Florida) – Part 2"	Alejandro Brugués	S : Eduardo Sánchez; T : Gregg Hale	April 21, 2020
14	14	"Destino (Florida) – Part 3"	Alejandro Brugués	S : Eduardo Sánchez; T : Gregg Hale	April 22, 2020

=== Season 2 (2020) ===
No. overall	No. in season	Title	Directed by	Written by	Original release date
15	1	"Almost There (Iowa) – Part 1"	Scott Beck & Bryan Woods	Scott Beck & Bryan Woods	September 28, 2020
16	2	"Almost There (Iowa) – Part 2"	Scott Beck & Bryan Woods	Scott Beck & Bryan Woods	September 28, 2020
17	3	"Almost There (Iowa) – Part 3"	Scott Beck & Bryan Woods	Scott Beck & Bryan Woods	September 28, 2020
18	4	"13 Steps to Hell (Washington) – Part 1"	Lee Cronin	Sarah Conradt	September 29, 2020
19	5	"13 Steps to Hell (Washington) – Part 2"	Lee Cronin	Sarah Conradt	September 30, 2020
20	6	"Red Rum (Colorado) – Part 1"	Daniel Goldhaber	Daniel Goldhaber & Isa Mazzei	October 1, 2020
21	7	"Red Rum (Colorado) – Part 2"	Daniel Goldhaber	Daniel Goldhaber & Isa Mazzei	October 1, 2020
22	8	"Red Rum (Colorado) – Part 3"	Daniel Goldhaber	Daniel Goldhaber & Isa Mazzei	October 1, 2020
23	9	"Dogwood-Azalea (Missouri) – Part 1"	Cate Devaney	Cate Devaney	October 1, 2020
24	10	"Dogwood-Azalea (Missouri) – Part 2"	Cate Devaney	Cate Devaney	October 1, 2020
