= List of Spectrum original programming =

This is a listing of programs that Spectrum has commissioned or co-commissioned. The shows produced for Spectrum are dubbed "Spectrum Originals".

== Original programming ==
=== Drama ===
Title	Genre	Premiere	Seasons	Runtime	Status
The Bite	Science fiction comedy drama	May 13, 2021	6 episodes	38–48 min.	Miniseries
Joe Pickett	Neo-Western crime drama	December 6, 2021	1 season, 10 episodes	45–59 min.	Ended (Note: Moved to Paramount+)

=== Comedy ===
Title	Genre	Premiere	Seasons	Runtime	Status
L.A.'s Finest	Police procedural action comedy	May 13, 2019	2 seasons, 26 episodes	45–52 min.	Ended

=== Co-productions ===
These shows have been commissioned by Spectrum in cooperation with a partner network.

Title	Genre	Partner/Country	Premiere	Seasons	Runtime	Status
Paradise Lost	Drama	Paramount Network/United States	April 13, 2020	1 season, 10 episodes	37–39 min.	Ended
Angela Black	Thriller drama	ITV/United Kingdom	February 7, 2022	6 episodes	60–65 min.	Miniseries
Long Slow Exhale	Sports drama	BET/United States	April 4, 2022	1 season, 12 episodes	42 min.	Ended
Panhandle	Comedy drama	The Roku Channel/United States	September 26, 2022	1 season, 8 episodes	47–49 min.	Ended

=== Continuations ===
These shows have been picked up by Spectrum for additional seasons after having aired previous seasons on another network.

Title	Genre	Previous channel	Premiere	Seasons	Runtime	Status
Mad About You (season 8)	Sitcom	NBC	November 20, 2019	1 season, 12 episodes	22–26 min.	Ended
Manhunt (season 2)	True crime anthology	Discovery Channel	February 3, 2020	1 season, 10 episodes	40–42 min.	Ended

=== Exclusive international distribution/Co-productions ===
These shows have been acquired and/or co-produced by Spectrum in a deal with several international partners for exclusive first-run release in the United States.

Title	Genre	Partner/Country	Premiere	Seasons	Length	Language	Status
Curfew	Action drama	Sky One/United Kingdom	June 24, 2019	1 season, 8 episodes	42–46 min.	English	Ended
Side Games	Sports drama	DirecTV Latin America/Latin America	July 15, 2019	2 seasons, 20 episodes	41–48 min.	Spanish	Ended
Temple	Medical crime drama	Sky One/United Kingdom	March 9, 2020	2 seasons, 15 episodes	43–45 min.	English	Ended
Eden	Drama	Stan/Australia	July 12, 2021	1 season, 8 episodes	44–46 min.	English	Ended
