= It's Not Like That =

2026 American television series

- Genre: Comedy drama Romantic comedy
- Created by: Ian Deitchman; Kristin Robinson
- Starring: Scott Foley; Erinn Hayes
- Composers: Caleb Chan; Brian Chan
- Country of origin: United States
- Original language: English
- No. of series: 1
- No. of episodes: 8

Production
- Executive producers: Ian Deitchman; Kristin Robinson; Jon Erwin; Justin Rosenblatt; Kelly Merryman Hoogstraten; Alex Goldstone; Scott Foley; Garrett Lerner; Brad Silberling; Jon Gunn
- Production companies: Deitchman/Robinson Productions; Anonymous Content; Big Indie Pictures; Wonder Project; Amazon MGM Studios

Original release
- Network: Wonder Project
- Release: January 25 – March 8, 2026
- Network: Amazon Prime Video
- Release: May 15, 2026

It's Not Like That is an American comedy drama television series created by Ian Deitchman and Kristin Robinson that premiered on January 25, 2026. Produced under Wonder Project, it stars Scott Foley and Erinn Hayes. In July 2026, the series was canceled after one season.

== Premise ==
Freshly divorced Lori and recently widowed minister Malcolm, friends with teens, navigate singlehood while questioning if their longstanding bond hints at a romantic future.

== Cast and characters ==
- Scott Foley as Malcolm Jeffries
- Erinn Hayes as Lori Soto
- J. R. Ramirez as David Soto
- Caleb Baumann as Merritt Soto
- Cary Christopher as Justin Jeffries
- Leven Miranda as Flora Jeffries
- Cassidy Paul as Penelope Jeffries
- Liv Lindell as Casey Soto
- Tyner Rushing as Jenny Jeffries

== Episodes ==
No.	Title	Directed by	Written by	Original release date
1	"Pilot"	Brad Silberling	Ian Deitchman & Kristin Robinson	January 25, 2026
2	"New Voices"	Brad Silberling	Ian Deitchman & Kristin Robinson	January 25, 2026
3	"Transition Townhomes"	Peter Sollett	Abdi Nazemian	February 1, 2026
4	"The Space I Keep For You"	Peter Sollett	Abdi Nazemian	February 8, 2026
5	"Cold Salami"	Valerie Weiss	Danielle DiPaolo	February 15, 2026
6	"Love Baskets"	Valerie Weiss	Jesikah Suggs	February 22, 2026
7	"The Lori Thing"	Rosemary Rodriguez	Adria Baratta	March 1, 2026
8	"Hope and Peace and Joy and Love"	Rosemary Rodriguez	Ian Deitchman & Kristin Robinson	March 8, 2026

== Production ==
The series was officially commissioned by Amazon Prime Video, with Ian Deitchman and Kristin Robinson serving as writer and showrunner, while Wonder Project managed the production. The cast is led by Scott Foley, Erinn Hayes and J. R. Ramirez. The cast also includes Caleb Baumann, Cary Christopher, Leven Miranda, Cassidy Paul and Liv Lindell. Filming of the series took place in Atlanta in June 2025.

On July 7, 2026, Amazon Prime Video canceled the series after one season.

== Release ==
The series premiered on the Wonder Project channel on Prime Video on January 25, 2026. Internationally, the series was released on Amazon Prime Video on May 15, 2026.
