= Haunted Mansion (soundtrack) =

2023 soundtrack album by Kris Bowers

Haunted Mansion (Original Motion Picture Soundtrack)

Soundtrack album by Kris Bowers
- Released: July 26, 2023
- Recorded: May 2023
- Studio: Eastwood Scoring Stage, Burbank, California
- Genre: Film score
- Length: 60:01
- Label: Walt Disney
- Producer: Kris Bowers; Max Wrightson

Kris Bowers chronology
Queen Charlotte: A Bridgerton Story (2023)	Haunted Mansion (Original Motion Picture Soundtrack) (2023)	The Color Purple (2023)

Haunted Mansion (Original Motion Picture Soundtrack) is the soundtrack album composed by Kris Bowers for the 2023 film Haunted Mansion by Justin Simien. It was released by Walt Disney Records on July 26, 2023.

== Production ==
In 2022, composer Kris Bowers was confirmed to be scoring Haunted Mansion. When finding a theme for the score, Bowers stated that the idea of family and community played a large part. He paid homage to the sound of New Orleans by including a variation of "Grim Grinning Ghosts" played by The Soul Rebels, an eight-piece jazz ensemble from the city.

Bowers included multiple interpolations of the "Grim Grinning Ghosts" theme in his score, with director Justin Simien stating, "Our composer, Kris Bowers, turned those simple phrases into one of the most lush, exciting movie scores I've heard." Bowers created several variations of the theme, including one four-note leitmotif that plays throughout the film, "especially when the ghosts are doing creepy things."

Bowers began recording the score at the Eastwood Scoring Stage in Burbank, California on May 16, 2023.

== Track listing ==
Haunted Mansion (Original Motion Picture Soundtrack) track listing
No.	Title	Performer(s)	Length
1.	"His Soul Left Gloss on the Rose"	The Soul Rebels	2:39
2.	"The Mansion"		4:41
3.	"Photo Tour"		2:24
4.	"Ben's 1st Ghost Photo"		2:04
5.	"Don't Leave After Midnight"		1:46
6.	"The Séance Room"		1:36
7.	"Ghost Wink"		3:01
8.	"Finding Leota"		3:17
9.	"William Gracey"		2:24
10.	"Grim Grinning Ghosts (Breakfast)"		1:19
11.	"I'll Talk to Him"		2:51
12.	"Reverse Séance"		2:41
13.	"The Ghost Realm"		3:22
14.	"She Was the Best"		2:12
15.	"Alistair Crump"	Steven Davis; Tori Letzler	1:35
16.	"No Windows and No Doors"		3:57
17.	"Crump's Hat"		2:03
18.	"It's Happy Hour Somewhere"		5:49
19.	"Ghost Chase"		3:37
20.	"Bruce to the Rescue"		5:14
21.	"Grim Grinning Ghosts (Dance Party)"		1:32
Total length:			60:01

== Release history ==
Region	Date	Format(s)	Edition(s)	Label(s)	Ref.
Various	July 26, 2023	Digital download; streaming	Standard	Walt Disney	
