= Memories from a Fading Room =

Studio album by Future Loop Foundation
- Released: July 16, 2007
- Genre: Downtempo, ambient
- Label: Louisiana Recordings

Memories from a Fading Room is a studio album by English disc jockey and record producer Mark Barrott, under the name of Future Loop Foundation. It was released by Louisiana Recordings on July 16, 2007.

== Track listing ==
1. Stereo '72
2. On the Village Radar
3. Vision On
4. Garden Communities
5. Everything As It Should Be
6. Homegrown Dynamic
7. In between Somewhere Beautiful
8. Experimentation Begins at Home
9. This is Where We Live
10. Sunshine Philosophy
11. Eagle Eyed
12. The Sea and the Sky
13. (1976)
