= Caleb Chan (composer) =

Canadian composer and musician

- Born: Canada
- Genres: Film and television scores; Contemporary classical
- Occupation: Composer
- Instruments: Violin, piano, guitar
- Website: http://www.calebchanmusic.com/

Caleb Chan is a Canadian composer, music producer, and multi-instrumentalist. He is best known as the composer for CBS's Boston Blue, Netflix's North of North, Amazon and Wonder Project's It's Not Like That, Nickelodeon's The Fairly OddParents: A New Wish & The Thundermans Return, Lego Dreamzzz, Alert: Missing Persons Unit, Sam Raimi's Roku series 50 States of Fright, Sony Pictures Television's Panhandle, and Allegiance for CBC. He is one half of a composing duo with his brother Brian Chan. He has worked extensively on animated series such as Netflix's Angry Birds: Summer Madness, DreamWorks Animation's Team Zenko Go and Apple TV+'s Pinecone & Pony. He was also a longtime contributor to the My Little Pony: Friendship is Magic franchise. In 2024, he was named SOCAN's Breakout Composer of the Year. He won a Canadian Screen Awards in 2026, and is a receipient of two Canadian Screen Music Awards and multiple Leo Award. He is also a recipient of a Reelworld Film Festival Trailblazer Award.

== Early life and education ==
Chan attended the University of British Columbia, Trinity Western University, and the University of Toronto where he graduated with a master's degree in music composition.

== Career ==
Chan's concert works are influenced by Chinese folk music and Western popular music. He is also a frequent collaborator with indie artists, often arranging and performing string parts.

== Selected filmography ==
Year	Title	Note
2012-2019	My Little Pony: Friendship Is Magic	Song Producer Seasons 3-9
2012-2019	Nina's World	Seasons 1-2
2012-2019	The Littlest Pet Shop	Seasons 1-4
2012-2019	My Little Pony: The Movie	Feature Film
2020	50 States of Fright	Seasons 1-2
2022	Team Zenko Go	Seasons 1-2
2022	Angry Birds: Summer Madness	Seasons 1-3
2022	Panhandle	Season 1
2022	Pinecone & Pony	Seasons 1-2
2022	Smoke Eater	Short
2023	Queen Charlotte: A Bridgerton Story	Song Arranger, Producer Limited Series
2023	The Nature of Things	Season 62, Episode 11
2023	Mindful Adventure on Unicorn Island	Season 1
2023	Builder Brothers Dream Factory	Main Titles Song
2024	The Thundermans Return	TV film
2024	The Fairly OddParents: A New Wish	Season 1
2024	The Worlds Divide	Feature Film Additional Music
2024-2025	Alert: Missing Persons Unit	Seasons 2-3
2024-present	Allegiance	Seasons 1-3
2025	North of North	Season 1
2025	Lego Dreamzzz	Season 3
2025	Boston Blue	Season 1
2026	It's Not Like That	Season 1
2026	Bridgerton	Song Arranger, Producer, Season 4
2026	A Safe Distance	Feature film
2026	Send the Rain	Feature film
Upcoming	Hypergalactic	Feature Film

== Awards and nominations ==
Award	Year	Category	Nominated Work	Result
Leo Awards	2016	Best Musical Score in an Animation Series	Nina's World	Nominated
Leo Awards	2022	Best Musical Score in an Animation Series	Angry Birds: Summer Madness	Won
Leo Awards	2023	Best Musical Score in an Animation Series	Angry Birds: Summer Madness	Won
Leo Awards	2023	Best Musical Score in TV Movie	A Fabled Holiday	Won
Leo Awards	2025	Best Musical Score in an Animation Series	The Fairly OddParents: A New Wish	Won
Canadian Screen Awards	2023	Best Original Music, Animation	Pinecone & Pony	Nominated
Canadian Screen Awards	2023	Best Original Music, Animation	Team Zenko Go	Nominated
Canadian Screen Awards	2024	Best Original Music, Animation	Pinecone & Pony	Nominated
Canadian Screen Awards	2024	Best Original Music - Original Song	Builder Brothers Dream Factory	Nominated
Canadian Screen Awards	2025	Best Original Music - Drama Series	Allegiance	Nominated
Canadian Screen Awards	2026	Best Original Music - Drama Series	Allegiance	Nominated
Canadian Screen Awards	2026	Best Original Music - Comedy Series	North of North	Won
Canadian Screen Music Awards	2022	Best Original Score for a Children's Program or Series	Pinecone & Pony	Nominated
Canadian Screen Music Awards	2022	Best Original Score for a Children's Program or Series	Team Zenko Go	Nominated
Canadian Screen Music Awards	2023	Best Original Score for a Children's Program or Series	Pinecone & Pony	Nominated
Canadian Screen Music Awards	2023	Best Original Main Title Theme	Builder Brothers Dream Factory	Nominated
Canadian Screen Music Awards	2023	Best Original Score, Dramatic Series or Special	Panhandle (TV series)	Nominated
Canadian Screen Music Awards	2024	Best Original Score for a Children's Program or Series	The Fairly OddParents: A New Wish	Nominated
Canadian Screen Music Awards	2024	Best Original Score for a Television Special	The Thundermans Return	Nominated
Canadian Screen Music Awards	2025	Best Original Score for a Children's Program or Series	The Fairly OddParents: A New Wish	Nominated
Canadian Screen Music Awards	2025	Best Original Score for a Comedy Series	North of North	Won
Canadian Screen Music Awards	2026	Best Original Main Title Theme	Boston Blue	Won
