= Chevalier (soundtrack) =

Chevalier (Original Motion Picture Soundtrack)

Film score by Kris Bowers
- Released: April 21, 2023
- Recorded: 2022–2023
- Genre: Film score; classical
- Length: 1:06:01
- Label: Hollywood

Kris Bowers chronology
We Own This City (2022)	Chevalier (2022)	Queen Charlotte: A Bridgerton Story (2023)

Singles from Chevalier (Original Motion Picture Soundtrack)
- 1. "Violin Concerto in G Major, Op. 8, No. 2: I. Allegro" Released: March 17, 2023

Chevalier (Original Motion Picture Soundtrack) is the soundtrack to the 2023 film of the same name directed by Stephen Williams, based on the life of French-Caribbean musician Joseph Boulogne, Chevalier de Saint-Georges, featuring original music composed by Kris Bowers, and also features classical compositions from the 18th century (some includes the own work of de Saint-Georges), reworked and produced by Michael Abels. The soundtrack was released by Hollywood Records on April 21, 2023, alongside the film, preceded by the first track "Violin Concerto in G major, Op. 8, No. 2: I. Allegro" released as a single from the album on March 17, 2023.

== Development ==
In August 2021, Michael Abels was roped in to compose music for the film, Nearly a year later, Kris Bowers recruited to score music for the film, thereby replacing Abels. It was later revealed that both Bowers and Abels had contributed original music for the film, although the former would receive the scoring credit, while the latter would provide music for the on-camera performances. Abels felt that "it was very important that the music be legitimate to Joseph [Boulogne] and the period, but also that it displayed his swagger in a way that would play to a modern audience". In the opening sequence, introducing the talents of Bologne to the French upper class with a violin showdown with Wolfgang Amadeus Mozart, he had to begin with Mozart's Violin Concerto No. 5, as the character was asked to play this music, and Joseph shows up and outplays it, which intended the importance to write in the style of what Joseph had written, which was "classical and showy". During the scene evolves over, the soloists take on a modern tone of Jimi Hendrix's style, hence the music reflected that way.

Bowers studied Bologne's music thereby starting with cues that were inspired by and stemmed from his music, while he could figure out how to modernize the sound, using it as a "launch pad to write themes that are very much inspired by his music" and while those themes are established he tried to limit those instrumentation to match with the traditional aesthetics of that period but finding ways to "mess with the score". He did not use synths, but however detuned and stretched string pads, violin and cello to much lower quality, used harpsichord as percussion instruments, reverbing solo violin performances to use it as a pad for texture, leading to a score that "feels fresh and contemporary without cheating what could have been done in Bologne's era".

"It was important that all the music could be played live. So we weren't using processes that couldn't have been found in 1775. Sometimes we might add a couple of instruments to give a little bit of extra power to a phrase, but primarily this was about displaying Joseph's music and telling his story and making sure that it was cinematically valid."

— Michael Abels

Using the character themes he developed for the film, he pieced the score together. While describing Joseph's themes, he said "There's a slave hymn that Michael and music supervisor Maggie Rodford discovered in one of Joseph's pieces, and it's this little moment where the melody theme stands out. So, [in the film], it's this piece his mother hums to him as a child and that becomes his fight for justice by the end of the film." Nanon's (Ronke Adekoluejo) theme was born from the notion of longing and reconnection, with Bowers adding:

This is an emotional moment. There's a lot of happiness in being reconnected. But for Joseph, there's anger and disappointment and his feelings of being abandoned. But as she's braiding his hair and talking about what Black people have been through, in my mind, that's where that theme is being handed to him in a way.

For Bologne's love theme with singing protégé Marie-Josephine (Samara Weaving), he looked back at tragic love stories and the darkness to those emotional love themes, so he had to strike a balance so as to "[encapsulate] those feelings that they felt for one another, without it being too dark or too sweet and lovey". Her thematic instrument was a grand piano which had been felted, while Bologne had a cello, which Bowers described: "When they first meet, there's this duet between the piano and cello, and it's straightforward. It's a softer, rounder and warmer sound." As their relationship gets intense, an "icy high violin comes in, and the cello becomes scratchier".

== Release ==
Joseph Boulogne's composition "Violin Concerto in G major, Op. 8, No. 2: I. Allegro" was released as a single on March 17, 2023. A three-track sampler featuring cues from Bower's original score released on April 20, while the full soundtrack was released by Hollywood Records on April 21.

== Track listing ==
No.	Title	Writer(s)	Artist(s)	Length
1.	"Violin Concerto in G major, Op. 8, No. 2: I. Allegro"	Joseph Boulogne Chevalier de Saint-Georges	de Saint-Georges; Randall Goosby; London Contemporary Orchestra	9:59
2.	"Sinfonie Liberté Part 1 & 2"	de Saint-Georges; Michael Abels	Abels	3:19
3.	"Main Title – Arrival at Polytechnic"	de Saint-Georges; Kris Bowers	Bowers; London Contemporary	1:07
4.	"Fencing Duel"	Bowers	Bowers; London Contemporary	2:15
5.	"Awarded Chevalier"	Bowers	Bowers; London Contemporary	1:20
6.	"Violin Duel"	Abels; Wolfgang Amadeus Mozart	Abels; Clayton Penrose-Whitmore; Wynton Grant; London Contemporary	3:31
7.	"A Letter Came for You – Nanon"	Bowers	Bowers; London Contemporary	2:34
8.	"It's Called Ernestine"	Bowers	Bowers; London Contemporary	1:27
9.	"The Kiss"	Bowers	Bowers; London Contemporary	1:28
10.	"Soul of an Artist"	Abels	Abels; Ronald Long Jr.; London Contemporary	1:22
11.	"Scena from Ernestine"	de Saint-Georges; François Guillome Desfontaines; Pierre Choderlos de Laclos	de Saint-Georges; Abels; Michael Skalický; Patricia Janečková	2:25
12.	"Now I'm Only a Negro"	Bowers	Bowers; London Contemporary	2:42
13.	"The Only Home I Knew"	Bowers	Bowers; London Contemporary	1:48
14.	"We'll Find a Desert Island"	Bowers	Bowers; London Contemporary	2:04
15.	"Not a Queen of France"	Bowers	Bowers; London Contemporary	4:57
16.	"Flowers Through Church"	Bowers	Bowers; London Contemporary	3:42
17.	"Choices Come from Within"	Bowers	Bowers; London Contemporary	4:09
18.	"Composing the Finale"	Bowers	Bowers; London Contemporary	1:28
19.	"Egalité"	Bowers	Bowers; London Contemporary	1:20
20.	"Dansons pour la vie"	Joel Virgel; Abels	Virgel; Abels	1:38
21.	"My Child"	Bowers	Bowers; London Contemporary	1:49
22.	"The Queen Is Here – You Will Be Erased"	Bowers	Bowers; London Contemporary	2:05
23.	"O cessate di piagarmi from Il Pompeo"	Alessandro Scarlatti; Nicolò Minato	Scarlatti; Janečková; Závada; Abels	1:10
24.	"String Quartet in D major, Op. 1, No. 6: Rondeau"	de Saint-Georges	de Saint-Georges; Gareth Murphy	2:23
25.	"String Quartet in E-flat major, Op. 1, No. 2: Rondeau"	de Saint-Georges	de Saint-Georges; Murphy	1:25
26.	"Violin Concerto in G major, Op. 8, No. 2: I: Allegro" (quartet version)	de Saint-Georges	de Saint-Georges; Murphy	2:34
Total length:				1:06:01

== Reception ==
Music critic Jonathan Broxton commented:

Chevalier is an excellent soundtrack, a superb mix of outstanding classical music from the period, and new original score which takes elements and influences from the period and blends it with more contemporary elements to first-rate effect. The solo violin performances – especially those by featured virtuoso Randall Goosby – are sensational, but Bowers's original music does play second fiddle (pun intended) to the classical selections, and is more muted in terms of its clearly recognizable thematic content. With that in mind, this still gets a recommendation as an excellent musical tribute – and long overdue acknowledgement – to this pioneer of black classical music.

Christy Lemire of RogerEbert.com wrote "Kris Bowers' sweeping score does work wonders, though, to create a feeling of atmosphere." Valerie Complex of Deadline Hollywood and Lovia Gyarkye of The Hollywood Reporter classified the score as "brilliant", "grandiose" and "fittingly epic".
