= Panhandle (TV series) =

2022 comedy-mystery series

- Genre: Comedy drama; Murder mystery; Rom-com; Procedural
- Created by: Carla Kettner; Nicholas Stoller
- Starring: Luke Kirby; Tiana Okoye; Lorenza Izzo; Forrest Goodluck; Wallace Smith; Glenn Morshower; Lesley Ann Warren
- Composers: Caleb Chan; Brian Chan
- Country of origin: United States
- Original language: English
- No. of seasons: 1
- No. of episodes: 8

Production
- Executive producers: Carla Kettner; Nicholas Stoller; Conor Welch; Colin Bucksey
- Producers: Moshe Bardach; Luke Kirby
- Production locations: Savannah, Georgia
- Cinematography: Giorgio Scali, ASC
- Editors: Shannon Mitchell, ACE; J.P. Bernardo, ACE; Hugo Diaz
- Running time: 40–45 minutes
- Production companies: Stoller Global Solutions; Danger Doll Productions; Sony Pictures Television Studios

Original release
- Network: Roku
- Release: September 26 – October 24, 2022

Panhandle is an American crime comedy-drama television series created by Carla Kettner and Nick Stoller and acquired by Spectrum Originals and Roku with Sony Pictures Television Studios. The show stars Luke Kirby as Bellwether Prescott, an eccentric with a crippling anxiety disorder and a penchant for deduction, and Tiana Okoye as Cammie Lorde, a traffic cop from the nearby (fictional) town of Boggsville, Florida. It first premiered on Spectrum on September 26, 2022 before it was later released on streaming in June 2023 on The Roku Channel as a Roku original.

== Premise ==
Rich, eccentric, agoraphobic Bellwether Prescott has been confined to his family mansion and grounds due tof a severe anxiety disorder since the death of his wife Vida Perez five years ago. He obsessively investigates local homicides as a hobby. Cammie Lorde, a cop stuck on traffic duty and notorious for handing out speeding tickets, is a recent arrival in the nearby town of Boggsville with her son Tyler and is hiding secrets about her past and true identity.

When a murder occurs on the Prescott property, Bell engages the assistance of a begrudging Cammie, who is unfamiliar with his peculiarities, as they solve crimes and attempt to uncover his wife's killer with the help of a quirky cast of local townspeople. As Bell and Cammie slowly develop a friendship despite their clashing personalities, they may be able to help each other overcome their personal problems.

== Cast and characters ==
=== Main ===
- Luke Kirby as Bellwether "Bell" Prescott, an old-fashioned eccentric, alcoholic and loquacious polymath who lives alone in his giant house with his mother and pet alligator. He is unable to walk outside his gate or exist in spaces with large number of people and he sees a projection of his dead wife wherever he goes. Bell has a wide range of niche interests and multiple degrees from online university programs, which make him very adept at solving crimes.
- Tiana Okoye as Cammie Lorde, a blunt and pragmatic police officer who is deeply unpopular in Boggsville for frequently awarding speeding tickets. She is a single mother without many friends and claims to be from Detroit, but Bell soon deduces she is not quite honest about her background and reasons for being in Florida.
- Lorenza Izzo as Vida Perez Prescott, who had a volatile marriage with Bell before her mysterious death five years ago. Her Cuban-American family is in the rum business and bought out the Prescott sugar manufacturing plants. Her unsolved murder is the primary mystery in season 1.
- Forrest Goodluck as Checotah, a local delivery boy and stoner, who is a friend to Bell and his mother and often gets sucked into their schemes.
- Wallace Smith as Dr Otis Wright, a doctor in Boggsville who wants to move away to Atlanta. He helps Bell examine corpses and develops a romantic interest in Cammie.
- Glenn Morshower as the Sheriff of Okaloosa County, Maxwell Grant. He is Cammie's boss and dislikes Bell.
- Lesley Ann Warren as Millicent Prescott, Bell's oddball widowed mother who is often seen wielding a gun. Since Bell's father's death six years ago, she has hardly left the house and has been looking after Bell since his wife's death.

=== Recurring ===
- Landon Chase Dubois as Tyler, Cammie's young son
- Melanie Minichino as Darby Hix, local exterminator, former stripper and Bell's childhood friend
- David de Vries as Skramstad, a Scandinavian hacker who regularly plays chess with Bell
- Déja Dee as Bitty, local hairdresser and close friend to Cammie
- Mo Gallini as Alejandro Perez, father to Vida and head of the El Calvero rum distillery
- Paulina Gálvez, as Alicia Perez, Vida's mother

=== Guest ===
- Drez Ryan as Marcus Malin, editor of the local newspaper and Cammie's ex-husband who is trying to get back into his son's life
- Angel Luis as Ramon Perez, Vida's gay brother and the only Perez who gets along with Bell
- Jesse Gallegos as Yasiel Perez, Vida's brother
- Erin Ownbey as Urleen, receptionist at the police station

== Episodes ==
=== Season 1 (2022) ===
No. overall	No. in season	Title	Directed by	Written by	Original release date
1	1	"To Bell or Not to Bell?"	Colin Bucksey	Carla Kettner & Nicholas Stoller	26 September 2022
2	2	"One Billboard Outside Boggsville, Florida"	David Solomon	Jon Cowan	26 September 2022
3	3	"A Fistful of Sand Dollars"	David Grossman	Dan Sterling	3 October 2022
4	4	"Sex, Lies and Ponce de Leon"	Brad Turner	Danielle Iman	10 October 2022
5	5	"One Flew Over the Peacock's Nest"	Erin Feeley	Zach Cannon	17 October 2022
6	6	"Fear and Loathing in El Calvero"	Randy Zisk	Sean Hennen	24 October 2022
7	7	"Machetes Out"	David Solomon	Jon Cowan & Daniel Sterling	24 October 2022
8	8	"Cammie Get Your Gun"	Brandon Sonnier	Carla Kettner	24 October 2022

== Production ==
On December 5, 2019, it was announced that Nicholas Stoller, Carla Kettner and Sony Pictures TV obtained a put pilot deal from Fox for their one-hour rom-com procedural originally titled Florida Man. The show was to be a co-production between Sony Pictures TV, under whom Kettner and Stoller had deals, and Fox Entertainment. Stoller and Kettner, as well as Stoller's producing partner Conor Welch, were to receive executive producer credits with Welch's being a non-writing credit.

The Florida Man pilot was picked up by Charter (Spectrum) on March 27, 2020 after Fox Entertainment passed on it. Kettner, who had previously been an executive producer on Bones, explained that the procedural format was an excellent format to have real drama and comedy, and called the show a "serialized crimedy." By March 1, 2022, when the casting of Luke Kirby, who also came on as a producer, and Tiana Okoye in the lead roles was announced, as well as the news that Emmy-winning director Colin Bucksey had been brought on for the pilot, the project had become a co-production between Spectrum Originals and Roku and been renamed Panhandle.

Kirby said of his experience as an actor and first-time producer: "We started this show coming out of COVID, and all of the restrictions and all of that, and I spent a lot of my time at home watching Columbo and Golden Girls [...] both of them gave me such a degree of comfort just to sort of dive into those realities for a half hour, an hour here and there [...] it made me kind of yearn for something along those lines coming out of it. And so when this came my way, it sort of felt like those two [...] were melding, and I took it as a sign to go for it."

The series was filmed in Savannah, Georgia, with Myrtle Grove Plantation in Richmond Hill serving as the central location of the Prescott compound.

The series is strongly similar to the French-Belgian series Balthazar which follows a forensic doctor haunted by the murder of his wife which he is still investigating and whose ghost he also sees as well.

== Release ==
On September 7, 2023, it was announced that Panhandle would be one of 35 shows removed from Roku as a cost-cutting measure. A second season has not yet been announced.
