= Mark Barrott =

English DJ and record producer

Mark Barrott (born 1968) is an English DJ and record producer.

== Early life and career ==
Barrott was raised in Sheffield. His father was an old car restorer. When Barrott was thirteen years of age in 1981, he began playing synthesizers in groups, motivated by watching a Sheffield City Hall live show of the band Kraftwerk. The works of The Human League was another influence of Barrott's early synthesizer career.

== Future Loop Foundation ==
Barrott went under the stage name Future Loop Foundation, creating ambient drum and bass recordings and being booked at several European gigs. The works of A Guy Called Gerald and the label Warp were also inspirations of his recordings released under the moniker. He was the first drum and bass act to perform on BBC Radio 1.

Barrott met his Black Forest-born wife Sara in October 1999 while touring throughout Europe and migrated to Prenzlauer Berg, Berlin to live with her. When he moved to Berlin, he began making more Kruder & Dorfmeister-influenced material. He felt that "my life had just begun" when moving to the city, and recalled that "It wasn’t like today, where every electronic music producer lives there and it’s become gentrified and safe." He was paid very little for his performances and gigs while in Berlin, garnering most of his cash from composing for British television. When interviewed by The Ransom Note in 2014, he said that he composed successful pop songs, but did not specify which such pop songs he composed.

Shortly after moving to Berlin, a hotel in Milan made a compilation CD that included one of Barrott's tracks, and invited any artist whose works were included on the compilation to perform at the hotel. Barrott made an agreement with the manager to DJ there once a week. A DJ and friend of the hotel manager from a Hyatt hotel in Milan was offered by Barrott an iPod containing his playlists. Barrott then gave his content to eight Sheraton hotels, before the Hyatt company employed Barrott to be their music consultant. The next five years involved Barrott traveling to hotels across the world.

== International Feel ==
When the five-year rent of Barrott and his wife's Berlin home was near an end, the couple moved to Punta Del Este, Uruguay. Barrott formed the International Feel label in 2009 to be creative with the music he was making. Barrott said, "There was no Machiavellian subplot, no big plan—I was just sat on my ass in Uruguay, enjoying the coast and making music to fill the time."

After three years living in Uruguay, Barrott sold his minimoog and the couple moved to Ibiza in October 2012. He began making balearic downtempo recordings. His first studio album to be released under the Mark Barrott moniker, Sketches from an Island, is based on the quiet nature of Ibiza, using Leonardo da Vinci's technique of "Sophistication through simplicity" to represent this concept. In 2014, he stated that he was unwilling to release music from other artists on his label, and preferred to make his own content for the imprint at the moment.

Barrott has done mixes and playlists for magazines and radio shows including Beats in Space, Electronic Beats, The Fader, Thump and Crack Magazine.

By July 2014, International Feel had sold more than 100,000 records.

== Artistry ==
Barrott uses very little equipment to create his music; he makes a challenge for himself to make "clever workarounds" with the limitations of the production utilities he works with: '"When I'm writing a song I'm trying to tell a story - it's a narrative - but the actual parts that make up the plotline have a very simple ethos now, i.e. don't overload people with information." Despite piano training from the first to the eighth grade, he said in 2014 that he has a small setup including a three-octave mini-keyboard. He also doesn't listen to a lot of music from other artists, saying that he would lose original ideas if he did.

Barrott stated in a March 2016 interview:

music is about having a blank page and going forward. If I was to go and make a track this very minute, and I wanted some cricket noises at night, I can tell you now I’d still probably want to go out and record some new ones.

== Discography ==
As Future Loop Foundation

- Karma/Remote Viewing
- Discovery/Shake the Ghost (1996)
- Time and Bass (1996)
- Sonic Drift/Voodoo Sound (1997)
- Conditions for Living (1998)
- Daddy Radical (1998)
- Jumper (1999)
- PHunkRoc (1999)
- The Middle of Nowhere (2000)
- Après Ski/Après Everything (2002)
- What's Your Name? (2002)
- This is How I Feel (2003)
- Scratch & Sniff (2004)
- One Offs & Remixes (2007)
- Memories from a Fading Room (2007)
- The Sea & Sky EP (2009)
- This Is Not An Ending (2016)

As Mark Barrott

- Sketches from an Island (2014)
- Sketches from an Island 2 (2016)
- Bush Society (2015)
- Nature Sounds of the Balearics (2018)
- Jōhatsu (2023)
