= Builder Brothers Dream Factory =

Canadian Animated Television Series

- Country of origin: Canada
- Original language: English

Production
- Production companies: Scott Brothers Entertainment; Sinking Ship Entertainment

Original release
- Network: Treehouse TV
- Release: March 26, 2023

Related
- Property Brothers

Builder Brothers Dream Factory is a Canadian animated children's television series which premiered March 26, 2023, on Treehouse TV. Created in collaboration with Drew Scott and Jonathan Silver Scott of the Property Brothers television franchise, the series centres on animated versions of the Scott brothers as children, using their imagination and creativity to try to help their neighbourhood solve problems.

The voice cast features Kai Harris as Jonathan and Christian Corrao as Drew, as well as Meadow Kingfisher, Desmond Sivan, Laelani Chanel Croan, Naomi Snieckus, Mercedez Gutierrez, Angelique Lazarus, Liam McKenna and Emily Watt in supporting roles.

== Awards ==
| Award | Date of ceremony | Category | Recipient(s) | Result | Ref(s) |
|---|---|---|---|---|---|
| Canadian Screen Music Awards | 2023 | Best Original Main Title Theme Music | Brian Chan, Caleb Chan | Nominated | |
| Canadian Screen Awards | May 2024 | Pre-School Program or Series | Carla de Jong, Amory Millard, Drew Scott, Jonathan Scott, Josie Crimi, Matthew J.R. Bishop, Blair Powers, J.J. Johnson, Scott Kraft, Megan Laughton | Nominated | |
| Canadian Screen Awards | May 2024 | Best Original Music, Animation | Ian LeFeuvre, Earl Tomo | Nominated | |
| Canadian Screen Awards | May 2024 | Best Original Song | Caleb Chan, Brian Chan "Builder Brothers Dream Factory Theme" | Nominated | |
