= Team Zenko Go =

Computer-animated television series

- Season 1 promotional poster; from left to right: Ari, Ellie, Jax, and Niah
- Genre: Preschool; Superhero; Comedy
- Based on: Dojo Daycare by Chris Tougas
- Developed by: Jack Thomas
- Directed by: Karen J. Lloyd
- Voices of: Hartley Bernier; Penelope Good; Dominic Mariche; Nakai Takawira; D'arcy Han; Tabitha St. Germain
- Theme music composer: Matthew Tishler
- Composers: Caleb Chan; Brian Chan
- Countries of origin: Canada; United States
- Original language: English
- No. of seasons: 2
- No. of episodes: 22 (42 segments)

Production
- Executive producers: Jack Thomas; Michael Hefferon; Gregory L. Little; Kim Dent Wilder
- Producer: Tanya Green (Note: Credited as "Supervising Producer".)
- Editors: Nathalia Tavares; Erin McElvaine
- Running time: 23 minutes (12 minutes per segment)
- Production companies: Mainframe Studios; DreamWorks Animation Television

Original release
- Network: Netflix
- Release: March 15 – August 8, 2022

Team Zenko Go is an animated children's television series produced by DreamWorks Animation Television and Mainframe Studios. It is based on the "Dojo Daycare" books by Chris Tougas and developed by Jack Thomas.

== Synopsis ==
The series follows the exploits of the titular team, a group of 4 specially-trained kids who go around making "Zenkos" (Japanese for "good deed") in secret around their hometown of Harmony Harbor, assisted by their mentor, Auntie Yuki, and Ponzu, her pet flying squirrel.

== Voice cast ==
=== Main ===
- Hartley Bernier as Ari, the newest member of the team. Ari recently moved into Harmony Harbor in the series premiere and helps his mom run a comic book shop where they live. He is focused and brilliant, having been able to discover the team whereas everyone else has failed to notice. Ari uses a wheelchair and invents numerous gadgets for the team to use, most notably, an extending robotic arm called the grabinator. His suit color is orange.
- Penelope Good as Ellie, one of the team's senior members. Ellie is artistic and dramatic, though she can seem snobbish at times. Because of her creative abilities, she is very acrobatic and very skilled at jumping. She can also flawlessly impersonate a person's voice, often helping the team stay hidden. Her suit colour is teal.
- Nakai Takawira as Niah, one of the team's senior members. Niah loves being out in nature and is a contributing member to the community garden, in addition to many other memberships throughout town. She is an expert on the natural world and is capable of imitating bird calls. Her suit color is purple, and she is the only African-American member of the main cast.
- Dominic Mariche as Jax, one of the team's senior members. Jax is assertive but can overthink at times, even forgetting numerous tidbits. While Jax shares his teammates' agility and stealth skills, he is most notable for carrying a notebook containing facts about every person in town (constantly updated), giving the team some insight into their current case. His suit color is red.
- D'arcy Han as Auntie Yuki, the mentor of the team and the owner of a noodle truck in Harmony Harbor. Yuki gives advice that can occasionally seem vague, but she is always up to help when needed. She is a bit eccentric and tends to argue with Ponzu, but her assistance is often invaluable to the team. Her suit color is blue.
- Tabitha St. Germain as Ponzu, a northern flying squirrel and Auntie Yuki's pet and assistant. Ponzu is typically bratty and lazy, often causing as many problems as he tries to help the team solve. He is capable of numerous feats, including his species' signature gliding ability, but that is tempered by his immense appetite.

=== Supporting ===
- Tabitha St. Germain as Rona, Fawna, and Donna Dunsmore, three adult triplets. Donna runs her own delivery company and has named her truck Phyllis, while Rona is a socialite who works on putting Harmony Harbor on the map. Fawna, however, is generally seen in the community garden and often helps with wildlife and other animal-related matters.
- Hiro Kanagawa as Mr. Tanaka, an elderly bespectacled man who works at the community center. Tanaka is one of the nicest people in Harmony Harbor's community, and later becomes Scruffy's owner in late season 1.
- Abigail Journey Oliver as Lula LaBlanc, a young girl who hangs around the team in their off time and is one of their most frequent Zenko subjects. Lula owns a pet snake and is known to be very energetic, meaning that she gets along well with the rest of the team.
- Rebecca Shoichet as Kat, Ari's easily-distracted mother and the owner of their comic book store. She shares her son's basic personality, though despite how their relation to each other would suggest, Ari is the more responsible one of the pair.
- Chance Hurstfield as Rodney J. Dinkle, an arrogant teen boy who believes himself to be the best around... despite being several flawed in several areas, though the team always helps him if he needs it. Rodney always causes trouble for the team due to his misplaced sense of class and lack of common sense or fairness, though they care for him all the same.
- Deven Mack as Ian, Niah's uncle and the most athletic man in Harmony Harbor.
- Gordon Cormier as Luis, a young boy and Gabriel's younger brother who is easily distracted.
- Vania Gill as Felicia, a girl introduced in the second season. She has a robot dog named Rosie, and is friends with Luis and Gabriel.

=== Minor ===
- Jaden Oehr as Henry, a young boy who hangs around with Lula.
- Micah Chan as Theo, a young boy who hangs around with Lula.
- Kaitlyn Vott as Sam Ochoa, a teenage girl who is always willing to help around town. She is often seen at the skate park and is an expert skateboarder.
- Madeleine Hirvonen as Maria, a young girl and aspiring artist who is a good friend of Ellie's.
- Josh Zaharia as Gabriel, a teenage boy and Luis's older brother.
- Michael Dobson as Ken Kablam, a famous comic book author known for his series "The Squasher."

=== Animals ===
- Scruffy, a hyperactive dog belonging to Mr. Tanaka. He resembles a mix between a terrier and a greyhound.
- Yolanda, a pigeon in Harmony Harbor who is disliked by the team for how often she interferes with a Zenko.
- Whiskers, a San Francisco garter snake belonging to Lula.
- Glitzy, a poodle owned by Rona Dunsmore.

== Episodes ==
=== Series overview ===
Season	Segments	Episodes	Originally released
1	23	12	March 15, 2022
2	19	10	August 8, 2022

=== Season 1 (2022) ===
No. overall	No. in season	Title	Directed by	Written by	Original release date
1	1	"Welcome to Harmony Harbor"	Karen J. Lloyd	Jack Thomas	March 15, 2022
New kid in town Ari knows something's up with Auntie Yuki’s noodle truck, and he wants in — but first, Niah, Ellie and Jax will put him to the test.
2	2	"Delivery Disaster"	Karen J. Lloyd	Story by : Shea Fontana & Mark Purdy; Teleplay by : Jack Thomas	March 15, 2022
2	2	"Slippery Business"	Karen J. Lloyd	Story by : Becky Wangberg & Sara Eisenberg; Teleplay by : Jack Thomas	March 15, 2022
When the town’s delivery truck breaks down, the team jumps in to help deliver the packages... but a particularly large one proves to be a challenge. When the team goes to search for Lula's pet, Ellie is horrified and forced to face her fears when said pet turns out to be a snake.
3	3	"You (Don't) Snooze, You Lose"	Karen J. Lloyd	Story by : Chris Gentle; Teleplay by : Jack Thomas	March 15, 2022
3	3	"Save the Squasher"	Karen J. Lloyd	Story by : Lila Scott; Teleplay by : Robin J. Stein	March 15, 2022
The crew keeps the noise down so Uncle Ian can get a good night's sleep before a big tournament, but Jax's attempts to use large-scale solutions brings the real risk of total failure. Ari and pals save Lula's first day at junior book club, which teaches him that gadgets aren't everything.
4	4	"Gopher It"	Karen J. Lloyd	Story by : Lila Scott; Teleplay by : Robin J. Stein	March 15, 2022
4	4	"A Glamping We Will Go"	Karen J. Lloyd	Story by : Arika Mark Fujita; Teleplay by : Robin J. Stein	March 15, 2022
The team sets out to stop a gopher from stealing vegetables in the community garden, but Niah's grudge against the species leads to her force control and cause several derailments. The town's camping troupe is currently being led by Rona Dunsmore, who knows next-to-nothing about the great outdoors, forcing the team- including a nervous Ellie- to intervene numerous times.
5	5	"The Amazing Donna"	Karen J. Lloyd	Steve Sullivan & Andy Geurdat	March 15, 2022
5	5	"Bye, Bye Boardie"	Karen J. Lloyd	Susan Kim	March 15, 2022
After she overconfidently decides to enter herself, the team sets out to make sure Donna's magic tricks dazzle at the talent show. Sam misplacing her skateboard in a donation event causes the board to switch hands numerous times, forcing the team to track it down and get it back.
6	6	"Lula's Last Stand"	Karen J. Lloyd	Laura Bowes	March 15, 2022
6	6	"Triple Trouble"	Karen J. Lloyd	Joe Purdy	March 15, 2022
Lula sets up a lemonade stand on a hot day, but it is so remote from town the team has to advertise the stand for her. An argument at breakfast time causes the Dunsmore triplets to break up, threatening their tradition of watching a special comet together unless the team does something.
7	7	"Pet Project"	Karen J. Lloyd	J. Green	March 15, 2022
7	7	"Mission Improbable"	Karen J. Lloyd	Sean Jara	March 15, 2022
The team must find a forever home for a dog with a big heart but lots of energy, and when Mr. Tanaka gets talked into trying him out they try everything possible to train the dog in secret. Rodney unfairly prevents Maria's sculpture from being entered into an art show, forcing the team to try and sneak it in.
8	8	"An Inconvenient Tooth"	Karen J. Lloyd	Andy Geurdat	March 15, 2022
8	8	"Up, Up and Away"	Karen J. Lloyd	Sean Jara	March 15, 2022
Jax looks to get Lula’s missing baby tooth back to her before the Tooth Fairy’s visit, but the team quickly encounters numerous hurdles. The team tries to reach a drone after it crash-lands on a roof, a task which gets harder when Yolanda intervenes.
9	9	"Lost and Found"	Karen J. Lloyd	Laura Bowes	March 15, 2022
9	9	"In the Park After Dark"	Karen J. Lloyd	Al Schwartz	March 15, 2022
The team finds a bin filled with missing items and set off to figure out their original owners, but finding who owns the final item proves difficult. The team oversees Rodney's late-night photoshoot as he searches for a bird, but helping him overcome his fear of the dark becomes tricky real fast.
10	10	"Longest Yardwork"	Karen J. Lloyd	Doug Molitor	March 15, 2022
10	10	"The Girl Who Cried Goose"	Karen J. Lloyd	Lienne Sawatsky	March 15, 2022
The crew tries to turn Donna's backyard disaster into the perfect place for a party... a task that falls apart without proper planning. Lula leads the team on a wild goose chase to avoid going to soccer camp, and they set off to help her out once they uncover the truth.
11	11	"Tanaka's Moving Castle"	Karen J. Lloyd	Jagjiwan Sohal	March 15, 2022
11	11	"Zenko Don't Go"	Karen J. Lloyd	FM de Marco	March 15, 2022
Mr. Tanaka never asks for help, but he can’t handle a big move all by himself... and neither can the team. Sam might miss her chance to meet her favorite comic book creator due to a skating competition, so the team tries to make him stay long enough to get her an autograph.
12	12	"Driven to Distraction"	Karen J. Lloyd	John Hazlett & Christine Mitchell	March 15, 2022
12	12	"To Bee or Not To Bee"	Karen J. Lloyd	Al Schwartz	March 15, 2022
The team tries to keep Luis on track to pick up flowers for his granny’s birthday, but he never stays focused despite their best efforts. The team has to hunt down Rodney's escaped bees, which becomes prohibitively difficult when they end up in a backyard party.

=== Season 2 (2022) ===
No. overall	No. in season	Title	Directed by	Written by	Original release date
13	1	"Photo Day Disaster"	Karen J. Lloyd	Desmond Sargeant	August 8, 2022
13	1	"The Eightful Eight"	Karen J. Lloyd	Dan Williams	August 8, 2022
Ari, Ellie and pals sneak around to make sure Rodney stays clean for his picture day. The squad helps Luis feel ready for his first-ever math test.
14	2	"Robo-Dog Day Afternoon"	Karen J. Lloyd	Laura Bowes	August 8, 2022
14	2	"Spoiler Alert"	Karen J. Lloyd	John Hazlett & Christine Mitchell	August 8, 2022
Niah leads the pack when a new kid's robo-dog glitches out of control. Lula has no clue about her surprise party — and the team must keep it that way.
15	3	"Rodney J. Dinkle, Babysitter"	Karen J. Lloyd	Steve Sullivan and Andy Guerdat	August 8, 2022
15	3	"Lights Out"	Karen J. Lloyd	Jeff Sager	August 8, 2022
The Zenkos give Rodney some much-needed back-up for his new babysitting gig. The power's out all over town, so the squad spreads out to do some good.
16	4	"Double Booked"	Karen J. Lloyd	Michael Stokes	August 8, 2022
16	4	"Gym Enemy Cricket"	Karen J. Lloyd	David Grubstick	August 8, 2022
Ari and pals find a way to share one comic book between two superfans. A chirping cricket in the community center is ruining Fawna's silent yoga flow.
17	5	"Harmony Harbor Holiday Surprise"	Karen J. Lloyd	Andy Guerdat & Steve Sullivan	August 8, 2022
The town's holiday tree needs its star to signal the start of the festivities! Can the Zenkos retrieve the missing star and save the annual sing-along?
18	6	"The Big Sleepwalk"	Karen J. Lloyd	Jack Thomas	August 8, 2022
18	6	"Of Course You Can"	Karen J. Lloyd	John Hazlett & Christine Mitchell	August 8, 2022
Sleepwalking runs in Niah's family, and her Uncle Ian needs help getting back in his bed. Felicia's too afraid of falling to try the obstacle course.
19	7	"Rodney the Hero"	Karen J. Lloyd	Jeffrey Duteil	August 8, 2022
19	7	"Club Shed"	Karen J. Lloyd	Eric Toth	August 8, 2022
Rodney wants to be helpful, but the team needs to make sure nothing goes wrong. The Zenkos help Lula and Luis fix up a shed for their fan club.
20	8	"It Takes a Zenko"	Karen J. Lloyd	Mark Hoffmeier	August 8, 2022
20	8	"What a Racket"	Karen J. Lloyd	Bryan Roy	August 8, 2022
The team tries to track down lost items — and a mysterious thief — around town. Ian can't find his favorite racket before a big badminton game.
21	9	"The Great Paper Chase"	Karen J. Lloyd	Kris Marvin Hughes	August 8, 2022
21	9	"Home Is Where Ken's Heart Is"	Karen J. Lloyd	Jeff Sager	August 8, 2022
Only the Zenkos can help Rodney get his comic book safely to his idol. Ken Kablam's homesick for his old town, so the crew hopes to lift his spirits.
22	10	"That Stinking Feeling"	Karen J. Lloyd	Nick Purrier	August 8, 2022
22	10	"Go for the Gold"	Karen J. Lloyd	Robin J. Stein	August 8, 2022
A friendly skunk's keeping Donna and her dog awake at night — and messing up her deliveries. Jax and friends help Rona prepare for the town's big party.

== Release ==
Team Zenko Go was globally released on March 15, 2022, on Netflix. A trailer was released on February 17, 2022. Originally slated for a July 11 release, a second season released on August 8, 2022.
