= Submachine (series) =

Video game series

The Submachine (short for Submerged Machine) series is a series of point-and-click adventure Flash games created by Polish comics author Mateusz Skutnik and released in ten installments, from 2005 to 2015.

Every game focuses on an unidentified character who explores new locations of the "Subnet", which is a broken and distorted reality that features decaying buildings and abandoned structures. The buildings and structures are categorized into groups called "submachines" based on architectural style. The games has been described as an "escape puzzle series", where the player must solve different puzzles and explore the environment in order to escape. The series has been generally well received.

In addition to the ten installments, there are four spin-offs. Two of the spin-offs were made for a Jayisgames contest and another for the website of the band Future Loop Foundation.

== Games in the series ==
=== Part of the main series ===
- Submachine 1: The Basement (Plus HD Version and changelogs) (original version: 2005) (current version: March 2014)

Various versions of this game can be played through Mateusz Skutnik's Submachine 1 Changelog.

- Submachine 2: The Lighthouse (Plus HD Version and original version) (original version: June 2006) (current version: October 2013)
- Submachine 3: The Loop (Plus HD version) (August 2006) (HD version: July 2014)
- Submachine 4: The Lab (Plus HD Version) (April 2007) (HD version: June 2014)
- Submachine 5: The Root (Plus HD Version) (January 2008) (HD version: January 2014)
- Submachine 6: The Edge (Plus HD Version) (October 2009)
- Submachine 7: The Core (Plus HD Version) (December 2010)
- Submachine 8: The Plan (Plus HD Version) (September 2012)
- Submachine 9: The Temple (Plus HD Version) (March 2014)
- Submachine 10: The Exit (Plus HD Version) (December 2015)

=== Spin-offs ===
- Submachine: Ancient Adventure (aka "Submachine Zero: Ancient Adventure) (Plus HD version) (August 2006)

Submachine: Ancient Adventure was made for the 2006 Jayisgames Casual Gaming Design Competition.

- Submachine: Future Loop Foundation (June 2007)

Submachine: Future Loop Foundation was created to promote the band Future Loop Foundation.

- Submachine: FLF, or FLFHD (HD version of Submachine: Future Loop Foundation) (December 2014)

Submachine FLFHD is the only HD version of a Submachine game that contains different puzzles than its original online free counterpart. Mateusz Skutnik removed all references to the band Future Loop Foundation in FLFHD, making it more consistent with the Submachine world.

- Submachine: 32 Chambers (Plus HD version) (August 2010)

Submachine: 32 Chambers was made for the 2010 Jayisgames Casual Gaming Design Competition.

- Submachine Universe, (abbr. SubVerse, previously known as Subnet Network Exploration Experience/SNEE) (stated as "not a game" by Mateusz Skutnik) (first release June 2010) (HD version January 2017) (last updated February 2017)

Mateusz Skutnik has updated the SubVerse every few months since he first released it. It currently contains 107 "locations." Each update usually consists of adding one or more "locations" to the network, which contain theories, photographs, and video clips from fans.
Skutnik released a downloadable HD version on January 26, 2017 for free and only updates that (offline) version.

=== Other Submachine-related projects ===
- Submachine 2: The Lighthouse - Sketch

The Submachine 2 Sketch is an unfinished version of Mateusz Skutnik's original idea for Submachine 2.

- iSubmachine, a mobile game for iPhone (discontinued)

=== Submachine: Legacy ===
In 2023, Skutnik re-released the series as a single game, stringing the installments together as chapters of a larger narrative. The graphics were updated, new optional levels were added, and some details were changed. It was also the first of the series to be released on Steam. It combines the original ten-part series and several spin-offs into a single remastered game featuring updated graphics, additional content, achievements, and a unified narrative structure. The game received overwhelmingly positive reviews from Steam users. As of 2026, Submachine: Legacy has maintained an "Overwhelmingly Positive" user rating on Steam, with approximately 98% positive reviews.

Release timeline Main series games in bold
2005	**Submachine 1: The Basement**
2006	**Submachine 2: The Lighthouse**
2006	**Submachine 3: The Loop**
2006	Submachine: Ancient Adventure
2007	**Submachine 4: The Lab**
2007	Submachine: Future Loop Foundation
2008	**Submachine 5: The Root**
2009	**Submachine 6: The Edge (with HD release)**
2010	Submachine Universe
2010	Submachine: 32 Chambers
2010	**Submachine 7: The Core (with HD release)**
2011
2012	**Submachine 8: The Plan (with HD release)**
2013
2014	Submachine 5: The Root (HD release)
2014	**Submachine 9: The Temple (with HD release)**
2014	Submachine 4: The Lab (HD release)
2014	Submachine 3: The Loop (HD release)
2014	Submachine 2: The Lighthouse (HD release)
2014	Submachine 1: The Basement (HD release)
2014	Submachine: 32 Chambers (HD release)
2014	Submachine: Ancient Adventure (HD release)
2014	Submachine: FLF
2015	**Submachine 10: The Exit (with HD release)**
2016
2017	Submachine Universe (HD release)
2018
2019
2020
2021
2022
2023	Submachine: Legacy
2024
2025
TBA	Submachine: The Engine
TBA	Submachine: The Explorers

== Development ==
The games were created by Mateusz Skutnik, Polish cartoonist and comics writer from Gdańsk and author of the Rewolucje comics series. He cites Oddworld, Rayman, The Neverhood, Half-life and Portal as video game influences.

The games are created in Flash. Each game has regularly been released online (minus Submachine: FLF) to play on Mateusz Skutnik's own website and other popular Flash game websites such as Kongregate. Downloadable fullscreen versions can also be bought through the developer's store, and they are known as "HD versions".

The graphics are hand-drawn.

In a 2009 interview with Igor Hardy, Mateusz Skutnik stated that "This series should go at least until Submachine 10. After that, I don't know." Following the release of Submachine 10: The Exit (2015), Skutnik revisited the series with Submachine: Legacy (2023), a complete remaster and compilation released on Steam. Since 2025, he has also been developing Submachine: The Engine, described as a new chapter in the series featuring new story content and a level editor.

In 2016 Mateusz Skutnik formally announced his decision to move away from Flash as a game-building platform and started to use GameMaker to develop his future games. Flash was later discontinued.

In May 2026, Mateusz Skutnik confirmed active development of Submachine: The Engine, a new standalone entry in the series. According to the developer, the game began development after the release of Submachine: Legacy and will include a level editor allowing players to create custom Submachine levels.

== Community ==
The Submachine series has drawn a multitude of fans to join Pastel Forum, created by the developer. On this forum, fans have developed many theories, which are the main backing of most people's ideas on the story behind the Subnet, due to the often vague or implied storyline of the series.

Some of these theories are included in the Submachine Universe, which was described as a "lovely way to include the player community in [...] a series of solo adventures" by Andrew Plotkin of GamesShelf in his review of the game.

== Reception ==
The game series has been generally well received. As of August 2025, 98% of ratings for Submachine: Legacy on Steam are positive.

A review in Rock Paper Shotgun describes the game as "one of the highlights (...) of the Flash gaming era", going on to say,

It's clever, compact and menacing, a world of terrible contraptions that must be operated, fixed or broken, from relatively everyday clumps of pistons to eerie, pseudo-magical tech that calls to mind the Amnesia series.

— Edwin Evans-Thirwell, One of PC's best and spookiest puzzle games has returned from the abyss, Rock, Paper, Shotgun

=== Awards ===
The series has won numerous awards, including four from Jayisgames:

- Best of Casual Gameplay 2007 - Point-and-Click (for Submachine 4)
- Best of Casual Gameplay 2009 - Adventure (for Submachine 6)
- Best of Casual Gameplay 2010 - Point-and-Click (for Submachine 7)
- Best of Casual Gameplay 2012 - Point-and-Click (for Submachine 8)
- Casual Gameplay Design Competition #8 (for Submachine: 32 Chambers).
