= Wonder Project =

American film and television studio

The Wonder Project
- Type: Film production
- Industry: Faith-based entertainment
- Founded: December 6, 2023; 2 years ago
- Founder: Jon Erwin
- Headquarters: Austin, Texas; Los Angeles, California
- Key people: Jon Erwin; Kelly Merryman Hoogstraten; Dallas Jenkins
- Products: Motion pictures Television programming
- Website: www.thewonderproject.com

The Wonder Project is an American independent film and television studio in partnership with Amazon MGM Studios specializing in the production of Christian-themed entertainment.

== History ==
The Wonder Project was founded in 2021 by director-producer Jon Erwin. In 2023, former YouTube and Netflix executive Kelly Merryman Hoogstraten joined as CEO. It received $75 million in seed funding from investors including Lionsgate, Jason Blum, United Talent Agency, and others. Dallas Jenkins was brought on board as a special adviser.

The company's first major production was House of David, a biblical drama about the life of David produced for Amazon Prime Video. The deal was announced in early 2024 and the series premiered in February 2025. The series was well-received and soared to the top of Amazon's viewership charts, prompting Amazon to renew it for a second of three planned seasons.

In 2025, the company announced a deal to create a Wonder Project subscription service as an add-on to Amazon Prime Video which will allow early access to Wonder Project productions as well as hundreds of classic titles. The service launched on October 5, 2025, with exclusive access to season 2 of House of David before it was rolled out to all Amazon Prime subscribers. It attracted 500,000 subscribers in its first three weeks.

The first theatrical film entitled Sarah's Oil was released on November 7, 2025, via Amazon MGM Studios. The second film The Breadwinner, starring Nate Bargatze was released on May 29, 2026, via Amazon MGM Studios; a drama series called It's Not Like That starring Scott Foley and Erinn Hayes in partnership with Amazon MGM Studios ran for one season in 2026; Young Washington, a feature film produced with Angel Studios about the early life of George Washington was released on July 3, 2026. Projects in development include Flyer, a film about the Wright brothers; and The Old Stories: Moses, starring Ben Kingsley and O-T Fagbenle as a prequel to House of David.

== See also ==
- Kingdom Story Company
- Great American Pure Flix
- Affirm Films
- Fox Faith
- Lightworkers Media
