= Quebec literature =

Canadian provincial literature

This is an article about literature in Quebec.

== 16th and 17th centuries ==
During this period, the society of New France was being built with great difficulty. The French merchants contracted to transport colonists did not respect their end of the bargain, and the French and their Indian allies were at war with the Iroquois, allied to the English until 1701, etc. To add to these difficulties, the printing press was officially forbidden in Canada until the British Conquest.

In spite of this, some notable documents were produced in the early days of colonization and were passed down from generation to generation until today. The Voyage of Jacques Cartier, the Muses de la Nouvelle-France of Marc Lescarbot, the Voyages of Samuel de Champlain are memories of the exploration of North America and the foundation of New France.

The Relations des jésuites, Le Grand voyage au pays des Hurons of Gabriel Sagard, the Écrits of Marguerite Bourgeois were written by the many religious founders of New France who had undertaken the task of converting the Sauvages to Christianity.

Many songs and poems were transmitted orally by the early French settlers. A popular French ballad, À la claire fontaine was adapted by the voyageurs and gave us the version that is known today in Quebec.

The first patriotic song of Quebec (then known as le Canada) was written by a soldier, François Mariauchau d'Esgly. Entitled C'est le Général de Flip, it paid tribute to the resistance of the French at Quebec during the siege of General William Phips in 1690.

In France, Canada and New France in general caught the interest of many writers, notably François Rabelais who refers to Cartier and Roberval in Pantagruel.

== 18th century ==
Until 1760, the themes of nature, explorations, and the Sauvages continued to mark the imagination of the civilization of New France. The Moeurs des sauvages américains of Joseph-François Lafitau, Histoire de l'Amérique septentrionale of Bacqueville de la Potherie and the Histoire et description générale de la Nouvelle-France are in continuity with the writings of the preceding century.

The first verified use of the term Canadien to designate the descendants of French settlers in Canada was written in a song composed in 1756 in honour of Governor Vaudreuil after the military victory of Fort Chouaguen. In 1758, Étienne Marchand wrote a famous poem in Le carillon de la Nouvelle-France. This song tells the story of the victorious battle of Fort Carillon.

The first poem written by a Canadien after the cession of Canada to Great Britain is Quand Georges trois pris l'Canada written by an anonymous author in 1763.

The Quebec Gazette newspaper was founded in Quebec City by William Brown on June 21, 1764. The bilingual paper was published in both the French language and the English language and over the years survived to be the oldest newspaper still publishing in North America.

The literary trends of Europe and the rest of America slowly penetrated the cities, primarily Quebec City and Montreal. The writings of the Enlightenment and those produced at the time of the American and French revolutions were dominant in the available literature.

Valentin Jautard and Fleury Mesplet published the first journal of Quebec, the Gazette du commerce et littéraire, in 1778–79. Valentin Jautard, a disciple of Voltaire and sympathizer with the American cause, published many poems under different pseudonyms.

Some notable names of the time are Joseph-Octave Plessis, Ross Cuthbert, Joseph Quesnel and Pierre de Sales Laterrière.

In France, Voltaire wrote L'Ingénu, the tale of a Huron who visits France and also Chateaubriand, a French noble exiled in America, wrote Atala and René.

== 19th century ==
The 19th century marks the beginning of the first real literary works published by Quebecers, including Michel Bibaud, Pierre Boucher de Boucherville, François Réal Angers, Philippe-Ignace François Aubert de Gaspé, Amédée Papineau, Joseph Doutre, François-Xavier Garneau, Pierre Jean Olivier Chauveau, Louis-Antoine Dessaulles, H.-Émile Chevalier.

By the 1860s, Quebec authors were able to acquire a certain autonomy, as it became easier to publish a book and mass-produce it.

Antoine Gérin-Lajoie, Philippe-Joseph Aubert de Gaspé, Louis Fréchette, Arthur Buies, William Kirby, Honoré Beaugrand, Laure Conan, Edith Maude Eaton, William Chapman, Jules-Paul Tardivel, Winnifred Eaton, Pamphile Lemay were some of the key writers in this era.

An anonymous song, Les Raftsmen, became popular at the beginning of this century.

== 1900-1950 ==
Émile Nelligan, a follower of Symbolism, published his first poems in Montreal at the age of 16 but within five years he was diagnosed with Dementia praecox and confined to a lunatic asylum, after which he did not write any more works. His collected poems were published to great acclaim in 1903, though he may not have been aware of it, remaining institutionalized until his death in 1941. Among his most celebrated poems is Le Vaisseau d'Or. A biographical film about his life, entitled Nelligan, was released in 1991.

Louis Hémon, a native of France who moved to Canada in 1911, wrote the famous rural Quebec romance novel Maria Chapdelaine (1913) while working at a farm in the Lac Saint-Jean region. The title character would go on to become a key figure in Quebec's national identity. Hémon did not live to see the book's widespread publication, as he died after being hit by a train in Chapleau, Ontario. The novel has been widely published in many languages and film adaptations were made in 1934, 1950, 1983 and 2021.

Roman Catholic priest, historian, and Quebec nationalist Lionel Groulx wrote many works including the 1922 novel L'Appel de la race and the 1951 historical study Histoire du Canada français. His conservative ideology of clerico-nationalism would have a major influence on Quebec society into the 1950s.

Claude-Henri Grignon wrote the early modernist novel Un Homme et son péché (1933), which satirized life in rural Quebec, breaking with Quebec's literary conventions of the time. The book has been adapted for the screen on several occasions, most notably the 2002 film Séraphin: Heart of Stone.

Priest and folklorist Félix-Antoine Savard won acclaim and a medal from the Académie Française for the 1937 novel Menaud, maître draveur, set in the mountains of rural Charlevoix.

Under the pseudonym of 'Ringuet', physician and academic Philippe Panneton published Trente arpents (1938), the famous novel about the transition from agrarian to urban life in Quebec. The book won the 1940 Governor General's Award for fiction, among other prizes. Panneton would later become ambassador to Portugal.

Germaine Guèvremont wrote popular novels in the traditional roman du terroir style, such as 1945's Le Survenant and its 1947 sequel Marie-Didace. Roger Lemelin's classic novel of Quebec domestic life, Les Plouffe, was published in 1948.

In literature, the renovation during the 1930s is above all attached to the work by Hector de Saint-Denys Garneau which will explore the inner reality (Poésies) and the formal limits of writing in general (Œuvres en prose, Journal 1929-1939). In 1937, this writer published Regards et Jeux dans l'espace: this important book of Quebec poetry will have a deep impact on the future of the Quebec poetry, and its literature in general. Several critics and historians of literature consider that the publication of Regards et jeux dans l'espace, in 1937, marks the beginning of modern literature in Quebec. The main writers who will succeed to de Saint-Denys Garneau during the 1940s oscillated between the experience of loneliness and impulsive individual revolt.

In the first half of the 20th century, some writers provoked the ire of the powerful Roman Catholic church in the province. The publication of Jean-Charles Harvey's 1934 novel Les Demi-civilisés was considered scandalous. He was fired from his job as a journalist and the book was banned by authorities. Abstract artist Paul-Émile Borduas, a founding figure of the Automatiste movement, wrote the manifesto Refus Global (1948), advocating the separation of church and state in Quebec, for which he was ostracized by the establishment of the time and dismissed from his teaching position.

Manitoba-born writer Gabrielle Roy's debut novel Bonheur d'occasion (1945), considered a classic of Canadian literature, described the conditions of life in Montreal's working-class Saint-Henri neighbourhood. After being published in English as The Tin Flute (1947), the book would win the 1947 Governor General's Award for fiction and sell more than three-quarters of a million copies in the United States. She won further acclaim for the dark, emotional novel Alexandre Chenevert (1954) and won a third Governor General's Award for Ces enfants de ma vie (1977).

== 1950-2000 ==
Several important literary figures emerged from the Montreal Jewish community in the mid-20th century. A. M. Klein found great success in 1948 with The Rocking Chair and Other Poems, which won a Governor General's Award for poetry and sold in unexpectedly large numbers. He published his only novel, The Second Scroll, in 1951. Klein would come to be recognized as 'one of Canada's greatest poets and a leading figure in Jewish-Canadian culture'.

Mordecai Richler's fourth novel The Apprenticeship of Duddy Kravitz, set like much of his work in the largely Jewish Saint Urbain Street district of Montreal, was published in 1959 to great acclaim. This novel, Joshua Then and Now (1980) and Barney's Version (1997) would all be made into major feature films, while St. Urbain's Horseman (1971) and Solomon Gursky Was Here (1989) were shortlisted for the Man Booker Prize. Richler's satirical 1992 book Oh Canada! Oh Quebec! stirred controversy by lampooning Quebec's language laws restricting the use of English, leading to criticism by Quebec nationalists.

The outspoken, flamboyant poet Irving Layton rose to national prominence with 1959's A Red Carpet for the Sun, which won the Governor General's Award. Leonard Cohen published the poetry collections Let Us Compare Mythologies (1956), The Spice-Box of Earth (1961) and Flowers for Hitler (1964) and the novels The Favourite Game (1963) and Beautiful Losers (1966) before going on to achieve international stardom as a musician. Louis Dudek published dozens of volumes of poems including Europe (1954), The Transparent Sea (1956), En Mexico (1958) and Atlantis (1967). He was invested as a member of the Order of Canada in 1984 as 'one of Canada's leading poets'.

Quebec City author Yves Thériault found success with his sixth novel Agaguk (1958), which dealt with cultural conflicts between Inuit and white men. This book sold 300,000 copies and was translated into seven languages. His next novel Ashini (1961) won the Governor General's Award for French Language Fiction.

Dancer Raymond Goulet writes in 1957 L'Âne de Carpizan, the first quebec novel in which the protagonist undergoes gender reassignment. Its main subjects are centered around satire and anticlerical themes. Upon parution, the novel did not make waves until its existence was rediscovered in 2019.

Author and poet Anne Hébert's first novel Les Chambres de bois was released in 1958 and she would later write such award-winning works as Kamouraska (1970) and Les fous de Bassan (1982), both of which would be adapted into films. Her novels Les enfants du sabbat (1975) and L'enfant chargé des songes (1992) both won the Governor General's Award for fiction, and Poèmes won the award for poetry in 1960.

Marie-Claire Blais published her first novel La Belle Bête at the age of 20 in 1959 and would go on to write over 20 novels as well as plays, poetry and newspaper articles. She won the Governor General's Award for French-language fiction a record four times, for 1968's Manuscrits de Pauline Archange, 1979's Le sourd dans la ville, 1996's Soifs and 2008's Naissance de Rebecca à l’ère des tourments.

Numerous impactful writers were associated with Quebec's Quiet Revolution period beginning in the 1960s. Poet Gaston Miron is considered the most important literary figure of Quebec's nationalist movement. His poetry collection L'homme rapaillé was an instant success upon its publication in 1970 and remains among the most widely read texts in the Quebecois literary canon. Hubert Aquin's first novel Prochain épisode (1965), written while the author was detained in a psychiatric institution, is considered a classic of Canadian literature and was the winning title in the 2003 edition of CBC Radio's Canada Reads competition. Aquin would write five more novels before taking his own life in 1977. Prolific author Victor-Lévy Beaulieu, a fierce opponent of bilingualism in Quebec, wrote many novels beginning with 1968's Mémoires d'outre-tonneau and most notably 1974's award-winning Don Quichotte de la démanche. Pierre Vallières, an intellectual leader of the Front de libération du Québec (FLQ), wrote the controversial 1968 book Nègres blancs d'Amérique while incarcerated in an American prison, awaiting extradition back to Canada.

Atheist writer Gérard Bessette won acclaim for the 1960 existential tale Le libraire and won Governor General's Awards for L'incubation (1965) and Le cycle (1971).

Physician Jacques Ferron published his first book L'ogre in 1949 and received the 1962 Governor General's Award for French fiction for his novel Contes du pays incertain. In 1977 he was honoured by the Quebec government with the Prix Athanase-David.

In 1964 Jacques Renaud published the violent novella Le Cassé, now considered a classic of Quebec literature. This was among the first works to incorporate the joual French dialect of working-class Montreal. His novel En d'autres paysages (1970) was influenced by magical realism.

Réjean Ducharme's 1966 debut novel L'Avalée des avalés was short-listed for the Prix Goncourt and later won the 2005 French version of Canada Reads. He would win Governor General's Awards for that novel as well as 1973's L'hiver de force, a Beat Generation-influenced tale of bohemian life in Le Plateau-Mont-Royal, and the 1982 play Ha ha!

Michel Tremblay's first professionally produced play Les Belles-sœurs, written in 1965, set off a storm of controversy after its 1968 premiere for its use of joual street language and realistic portrayal of the lives of working-class Quebecois. The play would go on to have a profound effect on Quebec culture, and has been translated into more than thirty languages. A prolific writer, Tremblay would win many further accolades for a diverse body of work including the comedic novel C't'à ton tour, Laura Cadieux (1973), the plays Hosanna (1973), Albertine en cinq temps (1984) and Le Vrai Monde? (1987), and the opera Nelligan (1990) among many others. He received a Governor General's Performing Arts Award, Canada's highest honour in the performing arts, in 1999.

Jacques Godbout won the Governor General's Award for his 1967 novel Salut Galarneau! and his penetrating essays on Quebec society were collected in the books Le Réformiste (1975) and Le Murmure marchand (1984). He won further praise for the novel Une histoire américaine (1986). Godbout has been described as 'one of the most important writers of his generation' and having 'strongly influenced post-1960 Québec intellectual life'.

Poet and novelist Jacques Brault gained recognition for such works as Quand nous serons heureux (1970) and Agonie (1984), which each won Governor General's Awards.

Yves Beauchemin's first novel L'enfirouapé (1974) won the Prix France-Québec and his second novel, Le matou (1981), became the all-time best-selling novel in French Quebec literature. Beauchemin's third novel Juliette Pormerleau (1989) won the prestigious Grand prix Jean Giono.

Roch Carrier gained fame as a writer of contes (a brief form of the short story), most notably 1979's much-beloved children's tale The Hockey Sweater. He was made an Officer of the Order of Canada in 1991.

Quebec City author Pierre Turgeon first came to prominence with the 1970 novel Sweet Poison. He would go on to win the Governor General's Award for French-language fiction for La Première Personne (1980) and La Radissonie (1992). Turgeon's 1998 novel Jour de feu was released by the famous French publishing house Flammarion.

Montreal writer Fernand Ouellette has won Governor General's Awards in three different categories. He won for French-language non-fiction in 1970 for Les actes retrouvés, for fiction in 1985 for Lucie ou un midi en novembre, and for poetry in 1987 for Les Heures.

Montreal poet Marie Uguay released the collections Signe et rumeur (1976) and L'Outre-vie (1979) during her lifetime, and more works were published after her death at the age of 26 in 1981. A cultural center in the Ville-Émard neighbourhood was named in her honour.

Journalist Nick Auf der Maur served as a Montreal city councillor for two decades and became well known as a 'man-about-town.' He wrote or co-authored several non-fiction books about Quebec-related topics and a book of his notable Montreal Gazette columns was posthumously released as Nick: A Montreal Life, with an introduction by Mordecai Richler.

Suzanne Jacob created a diverse body of work including essays, installations, novels, performance pieces, plays, poems, and short stories. Jacob received Governor General's Awards for Laura Laur (1983) and La Part de Feu (1997).

Haitian-Canadian author Dany Laferrière's 1985 debut novel Comment faire l'amour avec un nègre sans se fatiguer was adapted into a controversial 1989 film of the same name. Laferrière's novels Le Goût des jeunes filles and Vers le sud were also made into feature films, and he won the Prix Médicis for 2009's L'énigme du retour.

Poet and novelist Élise Turcotte won the Prix Émile-Nelligan award for poetry for La voix de Carla in 1987 and for La terre est ici in 1989. Her 2003 novel La maison étrangère won the Governor General's Award for French-language fiction.

André Brochu was awarded the Governor General's Award for French-language fiction for 1991's La Croix du Nord and won the poetry prize for 2004's Les jours à vif.

Historian Esther Delisle found controversy with 1992's Le traître et le Juif, which was critical of leading Quebec nationalist intellectuals of the 1930s and '40s such as Lionel Groulx.

Innu writer Rita Mestokosho published her first poetry book Eshi Uapataman Nukum in 1995, and Née de la pluie et de la terre was released in 2014.

In addition, New Englanders of French-Canadian descent became important figures in 20th century American literature, notably Jack Kerouac and Grace Metalious.

== 21st century ==
Novelist and playwright Andrée A. Michaud won the Governor General's Award for French-language fiction for Le ravissement (2001) and Bondrée (2014). 2007's Mirror Lake garnered her the Prix Ringuet from the Académie des lettres du Québec.

Louis Émond found acclaim with the complex novels Le manuscrit (2002) and Le conte (2005), part of a cycle entitled Le scripte which is set within an abstract fantasy realm.

Marie-Francine Hébert won accolades for works of youth literature including Décroche-moi la lune (2001), Mon rayon de soleil (2002), and Le ciel tombe à côté (2003), which each won prizes at the Mr. Christie's Book Awards.

Dominique Fortier's debut novel Du bon usage des étoiles (2008) was shortlisted for the Governor General's Award for French-language fiction and she would later win the award with Au péril de la mer (2015).

== See also ==
- Culture of Quebec
- List of writers from Quebec
- Culture of Canada
- Francophone literature
