= Richler =

Richler may refer to:

- Daniel Richler (born 1957), a Canadian arts and pop culture broadcaster and writer; son of Mordecai
- Delisle-Richler controversy
- Emma Richler, a Canadian novelist; daughter of Mordecai
- Jacob Richler, a Canadian newspaper and magazine journalist; son of Mordecai
- Mordecai Richler (1931–2001), a Canadian author, Academy Award-nominated screenwriter and essayist
- Nancy Richler, a Canadian novelist; second cousin of Mordecai
- Noah Richler, a Canadian journalist; son of Mordecai
