= Jacob Two-Two =

Series of children's books by Mordecai Richler

- Book cover of Jacob Two-Two Meets the Hooded Fang
- Jacob Two-Two Meets the Hooded Fang (1975); Jacob Two-Two and the Dinosaur (1987); Jacob Two-Two's First Spy Case (1995); Jacob Two-Two on the High Seas (2009)
- Author: Mordecai Richler, Cary Fagan
- Language: English
- Published: 1975-2009
- No. of books: 4

Jacob Two-Two is a series of children's books written by Canadian author Mordecai Richler: Jacob Two-Two Meets the Hooded Fang (1975), Jacob Two-Two and the Dinosaur (1987) and Jacob Two-Two's First Spy Case (1995) written by Mordecai Richler, and Jacob Two-Two on the High Seas (2009) written by Cary Fagan. Jacob Two-Two Meets the Hooded Fang won the inaugural Ruth & Sylvia Schwartz Children's Book Award.

== Series overview ==
Jacob is the youngest child of five and has to say things twice because people do not hear him the first time, which led to his distinctive nickname. The character was once believed to have been inspired by Jacob Richler, the author's youngest son. Every character in Jacob's family has the same name as their counterpart in the real Richler family. However, despite the names, Richler stated that the characters were not based on his family.

== Adaptations ==
Jacob Two-Two Meets the Hooded Fang has twice been filmed, in 1978 and 1999, the latter film starring Gary Busey as the villainous Hooded Fang. The titles by Mordecai Richler have inspired an animated TV series Jacob Two-Two (TV series) produced by Nelvana, in Canada in English on YTV and in French on VRAK TV (French), and in the United States on Qubo.

== Posthumous continuation ==
In September 2009 Tundra Books, the publisher of the Jacob Two-Two series, released a new fourth book titled Jacob Two-Two on the High Seas. Mordecai Richler had always planned to write new adventures and had started a fourth book before he died in 2001. With the full support of the Richler family, the new book was finished by Canadian author Cary Fagan. It is a prequel to the first three books, with the family sailing back to Canada from England after Jacob's father writes an important novel.

Tundra re-released the series with new art and covers by Toronto artist, Dušan Petričić.

== Characters ==
=== Jacob Two-Two ===
Jacob is the youngest child in his family and tends not to be heard. As a result, he repeats everything twice automatically, which is the origin of his nickname. (See Jacob Richler.)

=== X. Barnaby Dinglebat ===
Jacob's next-door neighbour is an international spy, working for CMIST (Canadian Ministry of Intrigue, Spying, and Tattling). Jacob later helps Mr. Dinglebat and his agent Intrepid (a hamster) on top secret missions.

=== Morty ===
Jacob's dad, the writer of the popular "Amazing Ronald" books, is said to be based on Mordecai Richler. He is described as being fairly laid back and easygoing.

=== Noah and Emma ===
Jacob's older twin brother and sister respectively. The two of them are avid readers and wrestling fans, but they do not take Jacob seriously and treat him like a nuisance who cannot keep up with them. They form a superhero team known as "Child Power" and refer to themselves as Fearless O'Toole (Noah) and Intrepid Shapiro (Emma). They pick on Jacob a lot. (See also Noah Richler and Emma Richler.)

=== Marfa ===
Jacob's oldest sister, who is vain, loud-mouthed, and short-tempered but very smart. While she and Jacob argue a lot, she is proud of his achievements and they care about each other. (See Martha Richler.)

=== Daniel ===
Jacob's oldest brother, the epitome of cool in Jacob's eyes. He treats Jacob like a nuisance at times, but also seems to take him more seriously than Noah, Emma, and Marfa. He likes music, especially classics like the Beatles. (See Daniel Richler.)

=== Florence ===
Jacob's mother, who takes everything in her stride.

=== Mrs Sour Pickle ===
Jacob's geography teacher Miss Sour Pickle has a permanent scowl plastered on her face, like she smells something bad. She glories in catching her students not paying attention or talking in class, then giving them snap quizzes on the obscure capitals of equally obscure countries. The only thing Sour Pickle loves to do more than torment Two Two is cheer for her favourite team, the marvelous Montreal Marvels. It's her biggest secret that she simply adores hockey.

=== Miss Darling Sweetiepie ===
An adorable little old lady down the street constantly roaming about offering everyone she meets delicious baked goods.

=== Buford ===
An odd little kid with a string of unfortunate names. His full name is "Buford Orville Gaylord Pugh". His lack of anxiety and worries aren't due to a lack of intelligence but more to his inability to focus. He is prone to recounting pointless, shaggy dog stories at the drop of a hat. Buford and Jacob are both new at school.

== Media adaptations ==
=== Film ===
The first book in the series, Jacob Two-Two Meets the Hooded Fang (1975), was adapted into film twice:

- Jacob Two-Two Meets the Hooded Fang (1978 film)
- Jacob Two Two Meets the Hooded Fang (1999 film)

=== Animation ===
Jacob Two-Two (TV series), based on the books, was a Canadian animated series for television launched in September 2003.
