= Duddy =

Duddy is a surname. Notable people with the surname include:

- Brendan Duddy (1936–2017), businessman from Derry, Northern Ireland, who played a key role in the Northern Ireland peace process
- John Duddy (born 1979), Irish middleweight professional boxer
- Patrick Duddy, the United States Ambassador to Venezuela
- Sammy Duddy (1945–2007), became a leading member of the Ulster Political Research Group

== See also ==
- Fuddy-duddy, person who is fussy while old-fashioned, traditionalist, conformist, or conservative
- The Apprenticeship of Duddy Kravitz (book), 1959 novel by Mordecai Richler
- The Apprenticeship of Duddy Kravitz (film), 1974 Canadian comedy-drama film based on the novel
- Duddy, a 1984 musical based on the Mordecai Richler novel
