= The Apprenticeship of Duddy Kravitz =

The Apprenticeship of Duddy Kravitz may refer to:

- The Apprenticeship of Duddy Kravitz (novel), a novel by Mordecai Richler
- The Apprenticeship of Duddy Kravitz (film), based on the novel
- The apprenticeship of Duddy Kravitz (musical), based on the novel by Mordecai Richler
