= Joshua Then and Now (film) =

- Joshua Then and Now
- Directed by: Ted Kotcheff
- Screenplay by: Mordecai Richler
- Based on: Joshua Then and Now by Mordecai Richler
- Produced by: Robert Lantos; Stephen J. Roth
- Starring: James Woods; Gabrielle Lazure; Michael Sarrazin; Linda Sorenson; Alan Arkin; Alan Scarfe; Ken Campbell; Alexander Knox; Chuck Shamata; Kate Trotter; Robert Joy; Harvey Atkin; Paul Hecht; Eric Kimmel
- Cinematography: François Protat
- Edited by: Ron Wisman
- Music by: Philippe Sarde
- Production company: Moviecorp X Inc.
- Distributed by: 20th Century Fox
- Release date: 17 May 1985
- Running time: 118 minutes
- Country: Canada
- Language: English
- Budget: $10,940,000
- Box office: $542,420

Joshua Then and Now is a 1985 Canadian film and a TV mini-series, adapted by Mordecai Richler from his semi-autobiographical novel Joshua Then and Now. James Woods starred as the adult Joshua, Gabrielle Lazure as his wife, and Alan Arkin as Joshua's father. It was directed by Ted Kotcheff who had previously directed Richler's The Apprenticeship of Duddy Kravitz.

The film depicts Joshua growing up in his Montreal neighborhood, and then his adventures as a modestly successful writer. He marries the "golden shiksa" of his dreams, but eventually everything around him crumbles and he must act quickly to recover it all. A comedic drama, the film moves quickly without lingering for long on any incident and tells a connected complete narrative. Alan Arkin is frequently noted in reviews for an outstanding performance.

The cast included Michael Sarrazin as Kevin Hornby (Pauline's brother), Robert Joy as Colin Fraser (Pauline's first husband), Linda Sorenson as Esther Shapiro (Joshua's mother), Alan Scarfe as Jack Trimble, Ken Campbell as Sidney Murdoch, Kate Trotter as Jane Trimble, Alexander Knox as Senator Hornby, and Eric Kimmel as young Joshua. Filmed on location in Montreal, London, Brockville, and Ottawa, Ontario. Rated R. It has been transcribed to VHS (1986) and DVD-R (2016).

In 2023, Telefilm Canada announced that the film was one of 23 titles that will be digitally restored under its new Canadian Cinema Reignited program to preserve classic Canadian films.

== Plot ==
Joshua Shapiro, successful writer and pundit, in a hospital room, seems to have lost his wife and is in the middle of a sex scandal. Compelled to find meaning in his life, he reviews it from his youth to the present day.

Joshua grew up as a Jew in the working class St. Urbain Street area in Montreal. His upbringing was unusual because his father was a boxer who had become a gentle crook and his mother was a strip-tease dancer. Embarrassingly, she strips for his friends as part of a Bar Mitzvah party for him. Joshua's father is revealed to have a unique perspective on life, sex, and religion.

A trip to Spain as a young man is the impetus that sparks a career as a journalist and writer. In England in a momentary lapse of reason, Joshua forges letters about a (fake) homosexual affair with a British writer to sell to an American university archive. He meets an upper-class Canadian married to a poseur of a communist and steals her away to become his own wife. She is the daughter of a Canadian senator and Joshua's key into a level of society of which he is contemptuous.

In the meantime, Joshua's childhood friends have become successful in their own right. Some become targets for bizarre pranks as he settles various scores.

Joshua's conceited brother-in-law assumes a pivotal role in the novel as it is revealed that he is insecure and vulnerable. Neighbors in the wealthy cottage community around Lake Memphremagog lead him astray with dreadful consequences. Past indiscretions rear their ugly heads and Joshua must put together the shambles of his life.

== Cast ==
- James Woods - Joshua Shapiro
  - Eric Kimmel - Young Joshua Shapiro
- Gabrielle Lazure - Pauline Shapiro
- Alan Arkin - Reuben Shapiro
- Michael Sarrazin - Kevin Hornby
- Linda Sorenson - Esther Shapiro
- Alan Scarfe - Jack Trimble
- Ken Campbell - Sidney Murdoch
- Kate Trotter - Jane Trimble
- Alexander Knox - Senator Hornby
- Chuck Shamata - Seymour Kaplan
  - Yuval Kernerman - Young Seymour Kaplan
- Robert Joy - Colin Fraser
- Harvey Atkin - Dr. Jonathan Cole
- Paul Hecht - Eli Seligson
- Andrew Powell - Ralph Murdoch
- Jack Rider - Dr. Danzinger
- Talya Rubin - Susy Shapiro
- Robert Howard - Alex Shapiro
- Gordon Michael Woolvett - Teddy Shapiro

== Production ==
Mordecai Richler wrote a screenplay based on his book Joshua Then and Now. Ted Kotcheff, who directed a film based on Richler's The Apprenticeship of Duddy Kravitz, was selected to direct. Kotcheff was paid US$500,000 for the film.

Producers Robert Lantos and Stephen Roth decided to create both a film and miniseries to maximize the project's investment from Telefilm Canada. 20th Century Fox paid $2 million for the film's distribution rights and CBC Television gave additional investments. The film received $3 million in funding from Telefilm. $7.4 million was raised from Telefilm, CBC, and Fox, and an additional $1.8 million was raised by deferments and private investors.

Kotcheff was paid US$1 million, half in cash and the other in deferments, and Richler was paid US$350,000. James Woods was paid US$250,000 and Alan Arkin was paid US$150,000.

The film was shot from 7 August to 4 November 1984, at a cost of $10,940,000, after an initial budget of $9.2 million. Shooting was done Canada and the United Kingdom in Brockville, Montreal, and London. Douglas Leiterman was the completion guarantor for the project and knew that the film was going to run over budget, but believed it would only be up to $800,000.

Leiterman took control of the film away from the producers before editing.

The runtime is 118 minutes, but a longer version with additional characters that runs at 126 minutes was shown at the 1985 Cannes Film Festival. The film's ending was edited between its Cannes showing and North American release.

== Release ==
The film was shown at the Cannes Film Festival on 17 May 1985, and Toronto Festival of Festivals on 5 September. 20th Century Fox distributed the film and opened in Toronto on 6 September, Montreal on 13 September, and New York on 20 September. Lantos and Roth were the first Canadian producers to have two films shown at Cannes at the same time.

A party was held for the film one day before Cannes at Moulin de Mougins with 140 people in attendance and at a cost of $15,000.

== Reception ==
The film received a negative response at Cannes, but received a better response at the Toronto Festival of Festivals. In order to become profitable Joshua Then and Now had to earn $20 million. Audiences polled by CinemaScore gave the film an average grade of "B+" on an A+ to F scale.

== Awards ==
- Won five Genie Awards in 1986 including Best Supporting Actor (Arkin), Best Supporting Actress (Sorensen), Best Cinematography, Best Art Direction, and Best Costume Design.
- Nominated for 12 Genie awards 1986, including Best Picture, Best Director, and Best Screenplay.

== Works cited ==
- Knelman, Martin (1987). Home Movies: Tales from the Canadian Film World. Key Porter Books. ISBN 1550130498.
- Turner, D. John, ed. (1987). Canadian Feature Film Index: 1913-1985. Canadian Film Institute. ISBN 0660533642.
