= Barney's Version =

Barney's Version may refer to:

- Barney's Version (novel), a 1997 novel written by Canadian author Mordecai Richler
- Barney's Version (film), a 2010 film based on the novel
