= Delisle–Richler controversy =

1990s Canadian controversy about accusations of antisemitism

The Delisle–Richler controversy is the name given by academics to an historical controversy in Canadian history surrounding allegations of antisemitism made by Mordecai Richler and Esther Delisle against several pre-World War II Quebec personalities, notably against the priest-historian Lionel Groulx.

== Writings by Delisle ==
=== The Traitor and the Jew ===
In her 1993 book, The Traitor and the Jew: Anti-Semitism and the Delirium of Extremist Right-Wing Nationalism in French Canada from 1929-1939, (Antisémitisme et nationalisme d'extrême-droite dans la province de Québec 1929–1939), French-Canadian historian and political theorist Esther Delisle documented Lionel Groulx's antisemitism as expressed in his writings from 1929 to 1939. Delisle wrote that Groulx's writings were rampant with various attacks against the Jewish people; blaming Jews for what Groulx viewed as his own society's social, and other ills.

=== Myths, Memories and Lies ===
In 1998, Esther Delisle published, Myths, Memories and Lies, an account of how some members of Quebec's elite, nationalist and federalist, supported Nazi collaborator Marshal Philippe Pétain and his Vichy government in Nazi-occupied France during World War II and helped bring French war criminals to safety in Quebec after the war ended.

=== Criticisms of Delisle ===
However, Delisle's work has also been criticized for allegedly altering or misquoting many of her actual citations of Groulx's work, criticisms with which Delisle has strongly disagreed. One such critic is Gérard Bouchard, who agrees with the basic premise that Groulx expressed antisemitic opinions, but who strongly disagrees with Delisle over the importance of Groulx' antisemitism to his overall body of thought.

== Writings by Richler ==
Oh Canada! Oh Quebec! Requiem for a Divided Country is a book by Canadian novelist Mordecai Richler. Published in 1992, it parodied the evolution of language policy in Quebec, and spoofed the Canadian province of Quebec's language laws that restrict the use of the English-language. The book, a best-seller, grew out of a lengthy article published in a September 1991 issue of The New Yorker.

=== Criticisms of Richler ===
Following the publication of Oh Canada! Oh Quebec! Richler faced a great deal of criticism from Quebec nationalists in the French media and some in English-Canada. Bloc Québécois leader Gilles Duceppe rose in the House of Commons to call Richler "a racist of the worst kind".

Pierrette Venne, a Bloc Québécois MP, called for the book to be banned, and for Richler to be prosecuted for disseminating hate propaganda.

== Allegations surrounding Groulx ==
In his lifetime, Groulx made the following statement: "L'antisémitisme, non seulement n'est pas une solution chrétienne; c'est une solution négative et niaise." ("Not only is antisemitism not a christian solution; it is a negative and silly solution.")

=== Immigration by non-Catholics ===
Groulx's alleged antisemitism has made him a controversial figure. Groulx's supporters have declared that his antisemitism has to be understood in the context of his conservative Catholic beliefs. Groulx perceived adherents of religions different from his own Catholic church as being opposed to his religion. While Groulx was opposed to all non-Catholics, Groulx had expressed a particular hatred of Jewish people and Judaism in particular. Groulx opposed immigration to Canada by Jews, Mennonites, Mormons, and other non-Catholics.

=== Jewish arrivals to Canada ===
Groulx was opposed to admitting, even temporarily, Jews fleeing the Holocaust in Europe; as outlined by historians Abella and Troper in their study None is Too Many. During the period he was studying in Europe, he wrote letters to his family in which he asserted that everything possible should be done to keep Jews out of Quebec.

=== French Canadian race ===
The writings of Lionel Groulx also espoused the idea of ethnic superiority. His pedagogical novel, L'Appel de la race (The Call of the Race) taught that "the children of ethnically mixed marriages suffer from a form of schizophrenia because they are inhabited by two different souls."

Groulx posited the existence of the French-Canadians as a heroic pure-blooded race that had been degraded by conquest, and lured away from their birth-right by foreign influences; the negative aspects of which he identified with Jews, as well as with the English and Americans.

=== Supersessionism ===
Groulx's conception of the French Canadians as race resembles his Roman Catholic conception of the Jews as a Holy Nation and God's Chosen People. As he explained in his diary, the French were "l'Israël des temps nouveaux choisi par Dieu pour être le suprême boulevard de la foi du Christ venu, l'épée et le bouclier de la justice catholique" ('Israel of the new times chosen by God to be the ultimate bulwark of the faith of Christ's coming, the sword and the shield of Catholic justice).

In this context, Groulx could be seen as playing a role analogous to the biblical prophets, denouncing the worship of the false gods of secularism, modernity and urban culture while calling his people back to what he understood as their true heritage. The French-Canadian "nation" whose suffering, Groulx imagined, had been ordained by God, was part of a divine plan as he saw it, to bring the "true faith," in his conception of Roman Catholicism, to the North American continent.

=== Inter-war period ===
In the inter-war period, Groulx was an avowed admirer of far-right dictators António de Oliveira Salazar and Benito Mussolini and hoped Quebec would find strong leadership. The occupation of that role by a politician like Maurice Duplessis was for him a bitter disappointment. The journal L'Action française took its title from a journal in France of the same name founded and edited by the far right writer Charles Maurras, but the Quebec journal later changed its name to L'action canadienne-française after Maurras' movement was condemned by the Vatican in 1926.

=== European influences ===
Some historians have claimed that, while studying in Europe between 1906 and 1909, Groulx fell under the influence of disciples of the prominent 19th century French racist Joseph de Gobineau (author of An Essay on the Inequality of the Human Races, 1853–55, the first systematic presentation of general racist theory, which had a strong influence on German and French anti-semitism), although later in his life Groulx denied any such influence.

=== Influence on French Quebec ===
Groulx's writings and views are virtually unknown outside of Quebec; however, he has been recognized as having a profound influence on French Quebec, its representatives, and its politicians. His anti-semitism had been noted by historians such as Mason Wade and heavily documented by archivist David Rome, but because of the controversy over his alleged expressed hatred of the Jewish people that Delisle's writing brought to the forefront, some individuals raised the issue of the appropriateness of having a prominent Montreal Metro station named after Groulx.

=== Metro station naming dispute ===
Consequently, in November 1996, a request was made to the executive committee of the Montreal Urban Community to remove Groulx's name from the Lionel Groulx Metro station. This prominent Metro station, a hub in the city's subway network, continues to bear Groulx's name, although a campaign has been launched to rename the station after the Montreal jazz pianist Oscar Peterson, who died in 2007.
