= Jacob Two-Two Meets the Hooded Fang (1978 film) =

- Directed by: Theodore J. Flicker
- Written by: novel Mordecai Richler screenplay Theodore J. Flicker
- Produced by: Mychèle Boudrias; Harry Gulkin
- Starring: Stephen Rosenberg; Alex Karras
- Cinematography: François Protat
- Music by: Lewis Furey
- Production company: Gulkin Productions
- Distributed by: Frontier Amusements (Canada); Cinema Shares International Distribution (United States)
- Release date: December 21, 1978
- Running time: 1hr 21 (81 minutes)
- Country: Canada
- Languages: English; French
- Budget: $1,000,000

Jacob Two-Two Meets The Hooded Fang is a 1978 film adaptation of Mordecai Richler's children's novel by the same name. He was a father of five children, with the youngest, Jacob, inspiring his character Jacob Two-Two. The main character is Jacob Two-Two, a young boy who has a habit of repeating himself in order to be heard by those around him.

== Significance ==
Although the original novel began "as a tale told to his youngest son", it is now considered to be a Canadian classic, and inspired future film and television adaptions. A 1999 adaptation of the source material and the popular television series Jacob Two-Two, which aired from 2003 to 2006, followed.

== Synopsis ==
This humorous children's story recounts the adventure of a young boy who strives to be heard. As Toronto Globe and Mail writer James Bradshaw writes, Jacob Two-Two is "two plus two plus two years old, has two brothers and two sisters, and has to say everything twice just to be heard; odd numbers aren't his thing." This quirk gives rise to his nickname "Two-Two". Two-Two's odd habit results in a misunderstanding that lands him in prison. The prison is guarded by a child-hating former wrestler named "The Hooded-Fang". Through his resourcefulness, cunning, and the help of a few friends, the young boy attempts to escape the prison and its monstrous warden.

== Plot ==
Jacob Two-Two is sent to the corner store. When he asks the store owner, Mr. Cooper, for "two quarts of chocolate ice cream please, two quarts of chocolate ice cream please.", Mr. Cooper is taken aback by Jacob's odd behaviour and begins to tease the boy. A policeman enters the store and joins in on the fun, pretending to charge Jacob with insulting an adult. Jacob panics, runs from the store to a park and hides under a pile of fallen leaves, where he eventually falls asleep.

When Jacob wakes up, he is taken to court, and sentenced to "…two months, two days, two hours, two minutes in the darkest dungeons of prison." Suddenly, Child Power enters the room, portrayed by Jacob's siblings, Emma and Noah. The judge nervously tells them that Jacob's sentence has already been passed. Child Power agrees but warn the judge that if they hear of any cruelty in the prison, then he will be hearing from them. Jacob leaves the court room only to find his siblings waiting for him in his cell. They give him a jewel shaped tracking device, and ask for his help. He promises to contact them if he senses any child cruelty in the prison.

When Jacob gets to the prison, he is introduced the fearsome warden, The Hooded Fang. The Hooded Fang tells Jacob that he hates children, then explains why - when he was a wrestler, he was feared by everyone, until a child pointed at him and laughed, telling the audience that the wrestler was not scary, only funny. After this incident, the Hooded Fang was unable to fight, because everyone would laugh him out of the stadium. Jacob apologizes to the Hooded Fang after hearing his story, telling him that he seems like a nice man. The warden is furious, as he wants everyone to think of him as mean and scary. When Jacob reaches his cell, he finds some candy and a note that says, "You have a friend".

Jacob is woken up the next morning by a man who introduces himself as Mister Fox, the head guard, and takes Jacob to the shower room to give him his new uniform. After a cold shower, Mister Fox finds the jewel that Child Power gave Jacob and takes it, thinking that it is a precious jewel. Jacob is then taken to a party in the dining hall. The Hooded Fang enters the room and all of the children start screaming. Jacob's new friends tell him that he must pretend to be afraid as well, or else the warden will be angry. The Hooded Fang tells Mister Fox to visit toy stores and sabotage all of the toys. Jacob is worried because Mister Fox has the tracking device, and if he leaves the prison, then Child Power will not be able to find the children.

Child Power is alerted that the tracking device has traveled to a toy shop in the city. They investigate and find Mister Fox sabotaging the toys. When asked where he found the jewel, Mister Fox lies and tells the children that he found it in a fish. Child Power is devastated, because they think that Jacob drowned while trying to escape and was then eaten by a fish.

The Hooded Fang travels to Jacob's cell and asks him questions in an attempt to break his spirit, but fails to do so. Eventually, he threatens to feed Jacob to the sharks. When Jacob is in the dining hall with his friends, he tells them he has written a note for Child Power and thinks that the Hooded Fang will deliver the letter for him.

The Hooded Fang brings Jacob his last meal before he is to be fed to the sharks. He tried to get Jacob to scream, but Jacob says that he knows that The Hooded Fang is the one who has been leaving Jacob notes and candy, because they always appear after the warden leaves Jacob's cell. The Hooded Fang agrees to deliver the letter for Jacob.

Child Power receives the letter and sets out to find Mister Fox. They battle and get the better of him, then tell him that they will spare him if he promises to take them to the prison. When they reach the water surrounding the island, Child Power poisons the crocodiles. Meanwhile, in the prison, the children rebel against the guard by destroying the smog machine and blinding the adults with the sun. The only adult that doesn't cower is the Hooded Fang, because as Jacob predicted, he is just a big kid.

When Child Power reaches the prison, Jacob tells them what happened. Child Power points out to Jacob that he is no longer repeating what he says. Jacob realizes that people are finally listening to what he says the first time. All of a sudden, Jacob is woken up by his father. He finds himself still under the play structure in the park where he fell asleep. He gives everyone in his family a hug, and they leave the park holding hands.

=== Cast ===
- Stephen Rosenberg as Jacob Two-Two:
  Jacob Two-Two is the film's main character. He is a cheerful and intelligent boy who has to repeat himself in order to be heard by those around him. Jacob is constantly told by those around him that he is too small to help anyone. In his dream he becomes the protagonist and saves the day despite his size.
- Alex Karras as The Hooded Fang:
  The Hooded Fang is a retired wrestler who desperately wants everyone around him to find him tough and scary. Although his wrestling career ended when a child laughed at him and told his audience that he was not scary, he still wears fanged teeth and a wrestling costume. He is the warden of the children's prison.
- Martha Richler as Emma/The Intrepid Shapiro:
  Emma is Jacob's older sister and one of the two members of Child Power!. When she is portraying her Child Power alter ego she goes by the name of "The Intrepid Shapiro". Although she does not believe Jacob is big enough to help in real life, in Jacob's dream she is one of his supporters. She helps the children escape from their prison.
- Thor Bishopric as Noah/The Fearless O'Toole:
  Noah is the brother of Jacob and Emma, he is another member of Child Power known as "The Fearless O’Toole". Along with his sister, he helps Jacob in his quest to free the children from the prison.
- Claude Gai as Mister Fox:
  Mister Fox is the head guard of the children's prison. He wears a large fur coat and is cruel and greedy.
- Guy L'Écuyer as Master Fish:
  Master Fish has the face of the man that Jacob saw in the store at the beginning of the film. He has a gravely voice, silver skin, and gills. He is one of the members of the prison guard.
- Joy Coghill as Mistress Fowl:
  Mistress Fowl has the face of the woman that Jacob saw in the store at the beginning of the film. She has red hair, a beak for a nose, and a big bird-like body. She often clucks and walks around awkwardly with her arms bent at her sides. She is one of the members of the prison guard.
- Earl Pennington as Mr. Cooper/Judge:
  Mr. Cooper is the owner of the store in real life, but the Judge in Jacob's dream. Mr. Cooper teases Jacob's habit and tells the young boy not to speak that way to an adult. It is clear in Jacob's dream that the judge, along with the other adults in the courtroom, does not like children.
- Yvon Leroux as The Policeman:
  The Policeman enters the store as Mr. Cooper teases Jacob about his habit. The Policeman joins in on the fun but takes things too far and causes Jacob to run from the store in fear. The Policeman tries to explain to the boy that it was a joke but cannot reach him in time.
- Victor Désy as Louis Loser:
  Mr. Loser is Jacob's lawyer when he is sent to court. He is clumsy, cowers under a desk in the court room, and has a thick French accent.
- Kirsten Bishopric as Marfa:
  Marfa is Jacob's eldest sister. She is watching wrestling when Jacob comes to see her in the beginning of the film and warns him that the program is too scary for the young boy.
- Walter Massey as Father:
  Jacob's father is the only person in the family who lets Jacob help. He sends him to the store to fetch some ice cream.
- Jill Frappier as Mother:
  Jacob's mother is cooking dinner in the kitchen when Jacob comes to ask if he can help. The two of them discuss Noah's interpretation of school.
- John Wildman as Daniel:
  Daniel is Jacob's eldest brother.

== Reception ==
=== Critical reviews ===
The Canadian film review site, Canuxploitation, reviewed Jacob Two-Two and the Hooded Fang and concluded that despite several issues, it was "definitely worth a look". The author stated that although they did not enjoy the children's musical numbers or the outdated animatronics, the film's connection to Canadian culture was far superior to that of its 1999 adaption. Although the reviewer enjoyed the introduction of Child Power, he felt that some of the most interesting aspects found in Richler's book were not conveyed as well as they could have been in the film.

Jacob Two-Two Meets the Hooded Fang (1978) was reviewed by a critic on the film review website, Prison Movies. The author provided the movie with 1.5/5 stars, comparing Jacob Two-Two's imagined children's prison from the film, to adult prisons in both other movies and actual prisons in real life. According to the critic, Two-Two's prison is a metaphor for adult incarceration in several ways. The smog that covers the island demonstrates the 'out of sight, out of mind' opinions that the public often holds about prisoners and the penitentiaries in which they live. The character of Mr. Fox parallels the common motif of a prison guard who enjoys smashing the sense of achievement of inmates through the use of mind games. The author summarizes their opinions of the film by stating that "In some ways, the biggest thing that sets it apart from most adult prison movies is the happy ending."

=== Author's response ===
Mordecai Richler, the author of the original book, spoke about the film in an interview for CBC radio. He was not pleased with the outcome of the film, telling the station: "I think it was a very bad job, very very bad job."

== See also ==
- Jacob Two-Two, the series of books upon which the film is based.
- Mordecai Richler, the author of the books upon which the film is based, and the person that the character of Father is based on
- Jacob Two Two Meets the Hooded Fang, the 1999 adaption of Richler's book
- Jacob Two-Two, the 2003-06 television series based on Richler's books
