= A Choice of Enemies =

1957 novel by Mordecai Richler

- First edition
- Author: Mordecai Richler
- Language: English
- Publisher: André Deutsch
- Publication date: 1957
- Publication place: Canada
- Media type: Print
- Pages: 272 pages
- Preceded by: Son of a Smaller Hero
- Followed by: The Apprenticeship of Duddy Kravitz

A Choice of Enemies is the third novel by Canadian author Mordecai Richler. It was first published in 1957 by André Deutsch.

== Plot and setting ==
The novel is set in London in the 1950s. A group of dissident writers and filmmakers from Canada and the United States settle in England to escape the McCarthy era witch hunt. Problems ensue after Norman Price, a former academic turned pulp writer, befriends a mysterious German refugee and is ostracized by the others. Their rigid idealism devolves into tyranny and Norman decides that "all alliances are discredited." He faces a personal dilemma where his choice of enemies is not clear.

== Theme ==
Richler uses biting wit, pointed irony and elements of surrealism to construct a parable reflecting the moral doubt and decay of modern society.
