= St. Urbain's Horseman =

1971 novel by Canadian author Mordecai Richler

- First edition
- Author: Mordecai Richler
- Cover artist: Harold Town
- Language: English
- Publisher: McClelland & Stewart (Canada); Weidenfeld & Nicolson (UK); Alfred A. Knopf (US)
- Publication date: 1971
- Publication place: Canada
- Media type: Print
- Pages: 462 pages (first edition)
- Preceded by: Cocksure
- Followed by: Joshua Then and Now

St. Urbain's Horseman is the seventh novel by Canadian author Mordecai Richler. First published in 1971 by McClelland & Stewart, it won the Governor General's Award for 1971.

== Plot and setting ==
The novel is set in London and Montreal during the late 1960s. The protagonist, Jake Hersh, first appeared in Richler's fourth novel, The Apprenticeship of Duddy Kravitz, as a schoolmate of the title character. Now, almost twenty years later, Hersh is a moderately successful film director, married with three children, who has become embroiled in a sordid sex scandal. With his world crumbling around him, Jake continues to be obsessed with the mystery of his long-lost cousin and idol Joey, an adventurer, Nazi-hunter and Spanish Civil War veteran.

== Translations ==
This novel has been translated into Spanish, by Manuel Bartolomé López, from the Weidenfeld and Nicolson edition, as El jinete de san Urbano (Barcelona/Buenos Aires/Mexico City: Best Sellers Grijalbo, 1975, 1st edition in Spanish).

== TV adaptation ==
The 2007 tv series St. Urbain's Horseman, directed by Peter Moss, is based on the novel.
