= Oh Canada! Oh Quebec! =

1992 book by Mordecai Richler

- The first edition of Oh Canada! Oh Quebec!: Requiem for a Divided Country
- Author: Mordecai Richler
- Cover artist: Martin Gould (design), Hames Seeley (photograph)
- Language: English
- Genre: Non-fiction
- Publisher: Penguin Books
- Publication date: 1992
- Publication place: Canada
- Media type: Print (Paperback)
- Pages: 277 (first edition, paperback)
- ISBN: 0-14-016817-6 (first edition, paperback)
- OCLC: 26256070
- Preceded by: Writers on World War II
- Followed by: This Year in Jerusalem

Oh Canada! Oh Quebec! Requiem for a Divided Country is a book by the Canadian novelist Mordecai Richler. Published in 1992, it parodied the evolution of language policy in Quebec, and spoofed the Canadian province of Quebec's language laws that restrict the use of the English language. The book, a best-seller, grew out of a long article published in a September 1991 issue of The New Yorker.

According to the book cover:

With a sure satirical eye, Richler takes a look at what he calls "the western world's goofiest and most unnecessary political crisis. English-speaking Quebecers endure Draconian language laws prohibiting English or bilingual signs in Montreal because they are seen as an affront to the city's visage linguistique.

== Reaction ==
Following the publication of Oh Canada! Oh Quebec!, Richler faced a great deal of criticism from Quebec nationalists in the French media and some in English-Canada. Pierrette Venne, a Bloc Québécois MP, called for the book to be banned. Daniel Latouche compared the book to Mein Kampf. Jean-François Lisée said "the contempt that he has for Quebecers, and for the facts, that trickles from every page, hurt me, as a Quebecer, [...] as a journalist also, as an author, the intellectual dishonesty with which he plays with the facts, he makes comparisons that are absolutely unacceptable, it gave me an enormous headache to read this book, it stopped me from sleeping. [...] Evidently, here in Quebec, we know that he exaggerates, but someone has to say it to English Canadians". He did so in a televised debate on the then-fledgling CBC Newsworld network, facing Richler.

Nadia Khouri believes that there was an anti-semitic undertone in some of the reaction to Richler, emphasizing that he wasn't "one of us", as Richler was Jewish, or that he wasn't a "real Quebecer". Additionally some passages were deliberately misquoted, such as the section about Quebec women being like "sows". Other French writers also thought there had been an overreaction, including Jean-Hugues Roy, Étienne Gignac, Serge-Henri Vicière, and Dorval Brunelle.

== See also ==
- Charter of the French Language
- Delisle-Richler controversy
