= The Street (story collection) =

Collection of short stories by Mordecai Richler

- First edition
- Author: Mordecai Richler
- Language: English
- Genre: Short story collection
- Publisher: McClelland and Stewart
- Publication date: 1969

The Street is a collection of short stories by Mordecai Richler. It was originally published by McClelland and Stewart in 1969. The stories take place on Saint Urbain Street in Montreal.

== Contents ==
- Introduction by Mordecai Richler
- "Going Home Again"
- "The Street"
- "The Summer My Grandmother Was Supposed to Die"
- "The Red Menace"
- "The Main"
- "Pinky's Squealer"
- "Bambinger"
- "Benny, the War in Europe, and Myerson's Daughter Bella"
- "Making It with the Chicks"
- "Some Grist for Mervyn's Mill"
- "The War, Chaverim, and After"

== Film adaptation ==
In 1976, the title story The Street was adapted as an animated short by the National Film Board of Canada. Directed by Caroline Leaf, the film was nominated for an Academy Award for Animated Short Film.

== Television adaptations ==
In 1979, CBC aired an award-winning (1980 Genie Awards) television movie The Wordsmith, adapted by Mordecai Richler from several stories in his book. The film was directed by Claude Jutra, and starred Saul Rubinek and Janet Ward.

"Bambinger" was adapted by Atlantis Films as one of the first episodes of the Global Playhouse anthology television series.
