= Coulée Grou =

Site of a battle of the Beaver Wars in Montreal, Quebec, Canada

Coordinates: 45.698909°N 73.503800°W

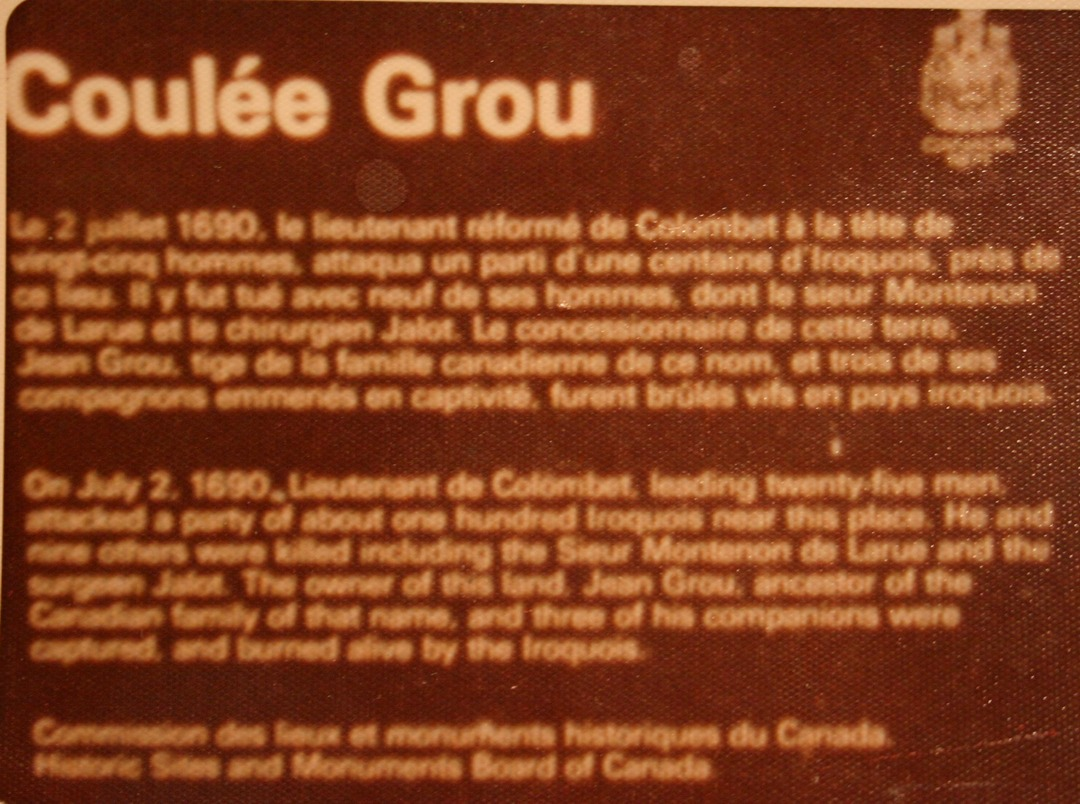
Photo of National Monument at Coulée Grou

Coulée Grou is the name of an area in Montreal, Quebec, Canada, that was the location of a battle of the Beaver Wars, also known as the Iroquois Wars, given in honor of Jean Grou, a Canadian pioneer. Grou had sailed as a young boy from Rouen in France (Normandy) to New France (French: Nouvelle-France) circa 1650–1665 and established a land-holding at Rivière-des-Prairies–Pointe-aux-Trembles, east of the modern city of Montreal. At a battle here on 2 July 1690, Jean Grou and three farm workers were captured and burned alive.

The site was designated a National Historic Site of Canada in 1924. The Historic Sites and Monuments Board placed a monument (GPS Coordinates 45.698874,-73.503897) near the Coulée Grou commemorating that battle between French soldiers and native Iroquois. The site is designated by two names: Battle of Rivière des Prairies / Battle of Coulée Grou National Historic Site. The monument is situated on or near the original Coulée Grou and is inscribed in both French and English. The plaque itself has been missing in recent years (through 2009), but the following is its English inscription:

"On 2 July 1690, Lieutenant de Colombet leading twenty-five men, attacked a party of about one hundred Iroquois near this place. He and nine others were killed including the Sieur Montenon de Larue and the surgeon Jalot. The owner of this land, Jean Grou, ancestor of the Canadian family of that name, and three of his companions were captured and burned alive by the Iroquois. Joseph Lajeunesse, descendant of Grou, donated the land & stone for this monument."

The register of Point-aux-Trembles of Montreal, dated 2 November 1694, completed the history of that battle. An English translation of that text follows,

"On 2 July 1690, at the end of the island near the "coulee" of Jean Grou, the Iroquois killed the Sr (Sieur?) Colombe, former lieutenant, Joseph de Montenon, Sr de la Rue, which the enemies burned the same day behind the fort of LaChenaye, Guillaume Richard dit Lafleur, our lieutenant of Militia, Jean Jalot, our surgeon.....Jean Delpue dit Parisot, Joseph Carrier dit Larose, Jean Raynau dit Planchar burned by the Oneidas (one of the Iroquois nations) with Jean Grou, calm & easy-going in the presence of father Millet, Jean Baudoin, son, Pierre Masta and an employee of great Bauchant named ...Pierre Payet dit St-Amours was taken in the attack and held prisoner on 2 July 1690, he was given to the Oneidas who let him live as well as demanding of us, father Millet, during the month of February 1691 in return for letting him live. St-Amours returned to the fort in 1693. Since the Iroquois were greatly feared, the bodies of those who had been killed were quickly buried at the same place that the massacre had occurred; it was not until 2 Nov 1694 that their bones were transported to the cemetery, where they were buried in the presence of all the settlers."

According to Jean Martin, PhD, director of history and heritage (Direction de l'histoire et du patrimoine) at Canadian National Defence (Défense Nationale), the Canadian attack frigate HMCS Grou was named in honor of Jean Grou.

Many North American derivations of the Grou surname (Groux, Groulx, La Grou, etc.) have been traced to Jean Grou and his lineage, including Lionel Groulx, noted Québécois historian and nationalist. Claude Ryan called Lionel Groulx the "spiritual father of modern Quebec."
