= Jacob Two Two Meets the Hooded Fang (1999 film) =

- Directed by: George Bloomfield
- Written by: novel Mordecai Richler screenplay Tim Burns
- Produced by: Greg Dummett; Christina Jennings
- Starring: Max Morrow; Gary Busey
- Cinematography: Gerald Packer
- Edited by: Ralph Brunjes
- Music by: Jono Grant
- Production company: Canadian Broadcasting Corporation (CBC)
- Distributed by: Odeon Films
- Release date: 8 October 1999
- Running time: 96 minutes
- Countries: Canada; United States
- Language: English

Jacob Two Two Meets The Hooded Fang is a 1999 film adaptation of the novel of the same name by Mordecai Richler.

== Synopsis ==
This humorous children's story recounts the adventure of a young boy who strives to be heard. As The Globe and Mail writer James Bradshaw writes, Jacob Two-Two is "two plus two plus two years old, has two brothers and two sisters, and has to say everything twice just to be heard; odd numbers aren't his thing." This quirk gives rise to his nickname "Two-Two". One day, he decides to buy the groceries for his parents, where he says, typically for Two-Two: "I want two pounds of firm, ripe tomatoes. I want two pounds of firm, ripe tomatoes." Misunderstanding Jacob, the clerk threatens to have him arrested for "insulting a grown-up"; Jacob runs from the store and eventually finds himself in court. He is sentenced to two years, two months, two weeks, two minutes, and five seconds by the judge (Ice-T) in the Children's Prison hundreds of miles away from civilization. His place of punishment is a dark, dirty dungeon-like place where the children work and are kept in cells. There are the three head characters, Master Fish, a fish/human, Mistress Fowl, a bird-like woman and the Hooded Fang himself. They also have green henchmen who spray "slime resistors" at the children to prevent them escaping. Two child agents try to help him out, as the children also devise a plan for escape.

== Cast ==
- Gary Busey ... The Hooded Fang
- Mark McKinney ... Mr. Fish
- Miranda Richardson ... Miss Fowl
- Max Morrow ... Jacob Two Two
- Ice-T ... Justice Rough, The Judge
- Maury Chaykin ... Mr. Cooper/Louie Loser
- Joe Dinicol ... O'Toole/Noah
- Alison Pill ... Shapiro/Emma
- Emma Bambrick ... Shelly
- Jake Goldsbie ... Oscar
- Shawn Roberts ... Daniel
- Lauren Harlow... extra

== Production ==
Costume design was by Linda Muir, who had won awards for costume design on Exotica and Lilies, both Genie Award winners for best picture.

== Critical reaction ==
Writing for Variety, Brendan Kelly suggests that while the opening of the film is funny, at least some of the material may not hold children's attention: "This dark, edgy kids’ fantasy may not have enough light action to keep the grade-schoolers amused. Sophisticated and largely intriguing, modern-day fairy tale centers on a six-year-old boy’s nightmare of life in a prison for kids. Helmer George Bloomfield and scripter Tim Burns have crafted a haunting, funny take on kids’ anxieties. But the acting is uneven, the pacing not fast enough for young attention spans, and the material may simply be too downbeat to click with the under-ten set."

Rotten Tomatoes reviewer Lafe Fredbjornson panned the 1999 film version as being a "not very good" adaptation of the book: "Because of how perfect the 1977 film was, this one's flaws stuck out. The kid playing Jacob Two-Two was pretty generic and lacked character. The Ice-T rap-session in the courtroom didn't seem to fit. Gary Busey as the Hooded Fang was scary for all the wrong reasons. Mark McKinney and Miranda Richardson seemed like standup comics in animal costumes. The prison set didn't feel like the one described in the book. The songs were dreadful."
