= Son of a Smaller Hero =

1955 novel by Mordecai Richler

- First edition
- Author: Mordecai Richler
- Language: English
- Publisher: André Deutsch
- Publication date: 1955
- Publication place: Canada
- Media type: Print
- Pages: 208 pages
- Preceded by: The Acrobats
- Followed by: A Choice of Enemies

Son of a Smaller Hero is a novel by Canadian author Mordecai Richler, first published in 1955 by André Deutsch. One of Richler's earliest works, it displays an earnest and gritty realism in comparison to his somewhat more satirical later novels. It is sometimes assigned reading for high school English classes in Canada.

== Plot and setting ==
The novel is set in Montreal, Quebec, Canada. The story centres on the working-class Jewish neighborhood on Saint Dominique Street, which stands in for Saint Urbain Street, the historical locale Richler would visit by name in subsequent writings. The protagonist is Noah Adler, a young and driven idealist who rebels against the entrenched cultural and social divides in the city.
