= Barney's Version (film) =

2010 film

- Theatrical release poster
- Directed by: Richard J. Lewis
- Screenplay by: Michael Konyves
- Based on: Barney's Version by Mordecai Richler
- Produced by: Robert Lantos
- Starring: Paul Giamatti; Rosamund Pike; Minnie Driver; Rachelle Lefevre; Scott Speedman; Dustin Hoffman
- Cinematography: Guy Dufaux
- Edited by: Susan Shipton
- Music by: Pasquale Catalano
- Production company: Serendipity Point Films
- Distributed by: Entertainment One
- Release dates: 10 September 2010 (Venice); 24 December 2010 (Canada)
- Running time: 134 minutes
- Country: Canada
- Language: English
- Budget: $30 million
- Box office: $12.1 million

Barney's Version is a 2010 Canadian comedy drama film directed by Richard J. Lewis, written by Michael Konyves, and based on the 1997 novel by Mordecai Richler. Starring Paul Giamatti, Rosamund Pike, Minnie Driver, Rachelle Lefevre, Scott Speedman and Dustin Hoffman, the film follows Barney Panofsky (Giamatti), an alcoholic soap opera producer as he navigates his three marriages to Clara (Lefevre), "The Second Mrs. Panofsky" (Driver) and Miriam (Pike), his relationship with his father Izzy (Hoffman), and the mysterious disappearance of his friend Boogie (Speedman).

Barney's Version premiered at the Venice International Film Festival 10 September 2010, where it was nominated for the Golden Lion, and was theatrically released in Canada 24 December 2010. Despite positive reviews from critics, the film was a box-office failure, grossing $12.1 million against its $30 million budget. Giamatti won a Golden Globe Award for Best Actor in a Motion Picture – Musical or Comedy for his performance. At the 83rd Academy Awards, Adrien Morot was nominated for Best Makeup.

== Plot ==
Barney Panofsky is living with his best friend Boogie in Rome. He marries the mentally disturbed and unfaithful Clara Charnofsky after she tells him she is pregnant with his child. He finds out the child — delivered stillborn — is not his, and he demands they separate. She commits suicide, and a devastated Barney decides to return home to Montreal.

Barney soon meets the woman who becomes his second wife, the daughter of a wealthy Jewish family. At their lavish wedding, Barney meets Miriam Grant and immediately falls in love. He tells her his feelings for her that night, but she rejects him.

Despite his marriage, Barney sends flowers and gifts to Miriam. He later picks up Boogie, who comes to detox for a few days at Barney's lake house. He walks in on Boogie in bed with his wife. Initially overjoyed that he has an excuse to divorce her and pursue Miriam, he later questions Boogie's integrity. The drunk men argue, and Barney shoots two bullets from his gun to dissuade Boogie from snorkeling, one into the air, before he trips and passes out on the dock, and Boogie falls backwards into the lake.

When Barney awakens, Boogie is missing. A detective tries to beat a confession out of him until his father, Izzy, intervenes. Barney continues to believe that Boogie ran away, and holds out hope that he will reappear.

With his divorce final, Barney asks Miriam on a date. He travels to New York City to meet her and finally begin a relationship. They marry and have two children, and Barney gets a job producing a television series. Izzy dies in a brothel, causing Barney to laugh and cry and call his father a "King". Barney and Miriam live happily until, on another vacation to the lake house, Barney meets Blair, who works in radio, Miriam's old line of work. There is an immediate platonic connection between Blair and Miriam, much to Barney's noticeable consternation.

After Barney and Miriam's son, Michael, leaves home, Miriam informs Barney of her intention to return to work. He attempts to dissuade her, but she persists and secures employment, thanks to support from Blair. Miriam begins work at a radio station, but Barney misses her first on-air interview — because he "was drunk and watching the hockey game, like has happened a thousand times before" — and is rude and dismissive to Miriam's colleagues.

Miriam remains steadfastly faithful to him, but eventually, his picaresque behavior results in her taking a weeklong visit to Michael's place in New York. While she is absent, Barney gets drunk at a bar and goes to bed with a former actress on his show. He tells Miriam about his infidelity, and they divorce. She soon marries Blair.

Barney, who has been displaying small signs of a deteriorating memory (forgetting where he left his car on two occasions), begins to show signs of an acute but unspecified memory loss. After Boogie's body is discovered near the lake house, dead from an apparent sky diving accident, Miriam meets Barney for lunch and offers to help as a friend.

When Miriam returns from the bathroom, Barney has paid for the meal but forgotten his wallet. She follows him, and, by the time she catches up to him, he has forgotten that they were divorced. He speaks to her as if it were years earlier, assuming that they're still married and that their children are quite young.

Barney's condition worsens until his death. While his children are helping to settle some of his affairs at the lake house, they observe a "water bomber" plane scoop up water from the lake and dump it on a fire on the mountainside, showing the children what could have happened to Boogie, referencing an urban myth. The final scene shows Miriam visiting Barney's grave, leaving roses at a tombstone bearing both of their names.

== Cast ==
- Paul Giamatti as Barney Panofsky
- Dustin Hoffman as Israel "Izzy" Panofsky, the father
- Rosamund Pike as Miriam Grant, the third wife
- Minnie Driver as the second wife
- Rachelle Lefevre as Clara Charnofsky, the first wife
- Anna Hopkins as Kate Panofsky, the daughter
- Jake Hoffman as Michael Panofsky, the son
- Bruce Greenwood as Blair
- Mark Addy as Detective O'Hearne
- Paula Jean Hixson as Grumpy's Bartender
- Scott Speedman as Bernard "Boogie" Moscovitch
- Thomas Trabacchi as Leo
- Clé Bennett as Cedric
- Saul Rubinek as Mr. Charnofsky, the first father in-law
- Harvey Atkin as the second father in-law
- Macha Grenon as Solange, the soap opera actress

Various Canadian film directors appear in cameos. Atom Egoyan appears as an early director of Barney's soap opera, Constable O'Malley of the North, while David Cronenberg appears as a later director on the same soap. Paul Gross plays the star of Barney's soap, and Denys Arcand portrays Jean, the maître d' at Barney and Miriam's luncheons beside the duck pond at Montreal's Ritz-Carlton. Ted Kotcheff appears as a train conductor.

== Production ==
After being in development for 12 years, the film was released in September 2010 with Paul Giamatti in the title role. It was directed by Richard J. Lewis and produced by Robert Lantos from a screenplay by Michael Konyves. Filming took place in Montreal, Lake Memphremagog, Rome and New York. The visual effects were produced by Modus FX in Montreal.

== Release ==
The film grossed $472,892 in Canada during its first few weeks. As of 17 April 2011, the film had grossed $4.3 million in the United States, and a total of $8 million worldwide. Most of the worldwide box-office was in Italy.

== Reception ==
As of January 2024, the film holds a 77% approval rating on the review aggregation website Rotten Tomatoes, based on 137 reviews with an average rating 6.65 out of 10. The website's critics consensus reads: "With a magnificent performance by Paul Giamatti, Barney's Version offers much comedy and insight to the complexities of modern romance." It has a score of 67 out of 100 on Metacritic, based on 33 critics, indicating "generally favorable reviews".

Roger Ebert praised the performances, writing that Giamatti's in particular "is one of those achievements. He is making a career of playing unremarkable but memorable men; remember his failed wine lover in 'Sideways,' his schleppy Harvey Pekar in 'American Splendor' and his soul-transplant victim in 'Cold Souls.'" Ebert added the performance "is successful not simply because of his acting but because of his exuding. He has a sweet quality that just barely allows us to understand why three women, the last of them a saint, would want to marry him. It’s not money: He’s broke when he marries the first, the second is rich in her own right, and the third is so desirable that Barney actually walks out of his own wedding reception to chase her to the train station and declare his love at first sight."

== Awards ==
Award	Date of ceremony	Category	Recipient(s)	Result
Academy Awards	27 February 2011	Best Makeup	Adrien Morot	Nominated
Genie Awards	10 March 2011	Best Picture		Nominated
Genie Awards	10 March 2011	Best Actor	Paul Giamatti	Won
Genie Awards	10 March 2011	Best Actress	Rosamund Pike	Nominated
Genie Awards	10 March 2011	Best Supporting Actor	Dustin Hoffman	Won
Genie Awards	10 March 2011	Best Supporting Actress	Minnie Driver	Won
Genie Awards	10 March 2011	Best Director	Richard J. Lewis	Nominated
Genie Awards	10 March 2011	Art Direction/Production Design	Claude Paré and Élise de Blois	Won
Genie Awards	10 March 2011	Costume Design	Nicoletta Massone	Won
Genie Awards	10 March 2011	Adapted Screenplay	Michael Konyves	Nominated
Genie Awards	10 March 2011	Original Score	Pasquale Catalano	Won
Genie Awards	10 March 2011	Best Makeup	Adrien Morot and Micheline Trépanier	Won
Golden Globes	16 January 2011	Best Actor - Comedy/Musical Film	Paul Giamatti	Won
Jutra Awards	13 March 2011	Best Screenplay	Michael Konyves	Nominated
Jutra Awards	13 March 2011	Best Art Direction	Claude Paré	Nominated
Jutra Awards	13 March 2011	Best Hair	Réjean Goderre	Won
Jutra Awards	13 March 2011	Best Makeup	Réjean Goderre	Won
London Film Critics Circle Awards	10 February 2011	Best British Actress	Rosamund Pike	Nominated
London Film Critics Circle Awards	10 February 2011	Best British Supporting Actress	Minnie Driver	Nominated
Satellite Awards	19 December 2010	Best Supporting Actress	Rosamund Pike	Nominated
