= Barney's Version (novel) =

1997 novel by Mordecai Richler

- First Canadian edition cover
- Author: Mordecai Richler
- Cover artist: John Scully (first edition photograph); Spencer Francey Peters (first edition design)
- Language: English
- Genre: Historical Fiction
- Publisher: Knopf Canada (first edition, hardcover); Chatto and Windus (first U.K. edition, hardcover)
- Publication date: 16 Sept 1997 (Canada); 25 Sept 1997 (U.K.)
- Publication place: Canada
- Media type: Print (Hardcover)
- Pages: 417 (first edition, hardcover); 424 (first U.K. edition, hardcover)
- ISBN: 0-676-97078-8 (first edition, hardcover); 0-7011-6272-4 (first U.K. edition, hardcover)
- OCLC: 37195945

Barney's Version is a novel written by the Canadian author Mordecai Richler, published by Knopf Canada in 1997.

== Plot summary ==
The story is written as if it is an autobiography by Barney Panofsky recounting his life in varying detail. Barney's version of events may be viewed as that of two unreliable narrators, in that his recollections are told from varying mental states and then posthumously edited by his son. Underlying the story of Barney's three marriages is the mysterious disappearance of his friend Boogie. Though there is no body, police suspect murder, and Barney himself is tried but acquitted of murder.

== Characters ==
- Barney Panofsky – Main character, an English-speaking Jew from Montreal, going from struggling friend of artists in Paris to rich TV producer back in Quebec.
- Bernard "Boogie" Moscovitch – Barney's best friend, whom he was judged not guilty of murdering.
- Terry McIver – Barney's friend turned sworn enemy. It is McIver's published memoirs that drive Barney to write his versions of events.
- Miriam Greenberg – Barney's third wife, who leaves him for Blair. Barney always hopes that she will come back to him.
- "The Second Mrs. Panofsky" – Barney's shallow and verbose second wife, whose name we do not learn, and who leaves Barney at the time of the disappearance of Boogie. She lives very well off Barney's money after their divorce.
- Clara Charnofsky – Barney's beautiful but mentally ill first wife, whom he met in Paris, and whose poetry from their time in Paris becomes best-selling feminist literature.
- Leo Bishinsky – Barney's friend from Paris, who became a famed artist.
- Cedric Richardson a.k.a. Ismail ben Yussf – Barney's rich friend from Paris.
- Morty Herscovitch – Barney's doctor in Montreal.
- Blair Hopper né Hauptman – A draft-dodging American who is taken in by the Panofskys and eventually becomes the partner of Barney's third wife, Miriam.
- Hymie Mintzbaum – A movie producer friend of Barney's.
- Sean O'Hearne – A Sûreté du Québec detective, certain Barney is guilty of Boogie's homicide.
- Duddy Kravitz – A character who makes a very late-in-the-novel cameo. He appeared originally in Richler's The Apprenticeship of Duddy Kravitz and later (very briefly) in St. Urbain's Horseman. He is now a wealthy man in his sixties.

== See also ==
- Barney's Version, 2010 film by Richard J. Lewis
