= Lionel Groulx =

Canadian historian (1878–1967)

The Reverend Lionel Groulx
- Canon
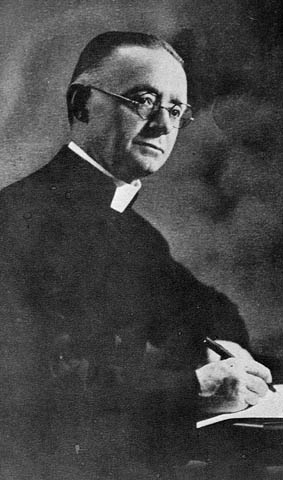
- Lionel-Adolphe Groulx photo from ca. 1925–1935
- Church: Latin Church
- Province: Quebec

Orders
- Ordination: 28 June 1903

Personal details
- Born: Joseph Adolphe Lyonel Groulx; January 13, 1878 Vaudreuil, Quebec, Canada
- Died: May 23, 1967 (aged 89) Vaudreuil, Quebec, Canada
- Education: Sainte-Thérèse Seminary (BA); Saint-Sulpice Seminary (Montreal) (Theological studies); Pontifical University of Saint Thomas Aquinas (PhD, ThD); University of Fribourg (Literature studies); Université Laval (MA); Université de Montréal (Litt.D)
- Motto: Misericordia Domini in æternum cantabo (Ps 88)

Lionel Groulx (French: [ɡʁu]; 13 January 1878 – 23 May 1967) was a Canadian Roman Catholic priest, historian, professor, public intellectual and Quebec nationalist.

== Biography ==
=== Early life and ordination ===
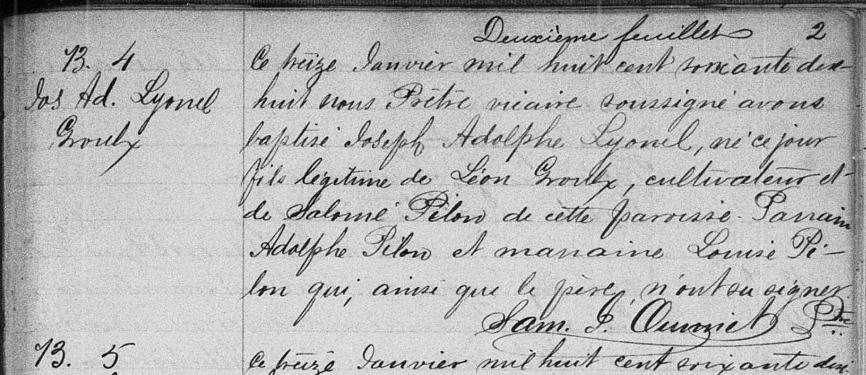
Birth and baptismal certificate of Lionel Groulx, 13 January 1878, église Saint-Michel in Vaudreuil (Québec).

Lionel Groulx, né Joseph Adolphe Lyonel Groulx, was the son of Léon Groulx (1837–1878), a farmer, a lumberjack and direct descendant of New France pioneer Jean Grou, and Philomène Salomé Pilon (1849–1943). Groulx was born and died at Vaudreuil, Quebec. After his seminary training and studies in Europe, he taught at Valleyfield College in Salaberry-de-Valleyfield, and then the Université de Montréal. In 1917 he co-founded a monthly journal called Action Française, becoming its editor in 1920.

He was ordained to the priesthood on 28 June 1903.

=== Study of Confederation ===
Groulx was one of the first Quebec historians to study Confederation: he insisted on its recognition of Quebec rights and minority rights, although he believed a combination of corrupt political parties and French Canadian minority status in the Dominion had failed to deliver on those promises, as the Manitoba conflict exposed. Groulx believed that only through national education and the Quebec government could the economic and social position of French Canadians be improved. Groulx was quite successful promoting his brand of ultramontanism.

His main focus was to inspire nationalist pride in Quebec by celebrating its history, both the heroic acts of New France and the French Canadian and self-government rights obtained through a succession of important political victories: 1774, the Quebec Act recognized the rights of the Quebec province and its people with respect to civil law, Catholic religion and the French language; in 1848, responsible government was finally obtained after decades of struggle, along with the rights of the French language; in 1867, the autonomy of the province of Quebec was restored as Lower Canada was an essential partner in the creation of a new dominion through confederation.

Lionel Groulx called the Canadian Confederation of 1867 a failure and espoused the theory that French Canada's only hope for survival was to bolster a French-speaking State and a Roman Catholic Quebec as the means to emancipate the nation and a bulwark against English power. He believed the powers of the provincial government of Quebec could and should be used, within Confederation, to better the lot of French-Canadians, economically, socially, culturally and linguistically.

His curriculum and writings de-emphasized or ignored conflicts between the clergy and those who were struggling for democratic rights, and de-emphasized any conflicts between the "habitants" or peasant class and the French-Canadian elites. He preferred the settled habitants to the more adventurous and, in his view, licentious coureurs des bois. His writings, under the pseudonym Lionel Montal, were submitted to the literature event in the art competition at the 1924 Summer Olympics.

In 1928, the Université de Montréal insisted that Groulx sign a paper saying that he would respect Confederation and English-Canadian sensibilities as a condition of receiving a respectable salary for his teaching work. He would not sign, but finally agreed to a condition that he would limit himself to historical studies; he resigned from the editorship of L'action canadienne-française soon after, and the magazine ceased publication at the end of the year.

Lionel Groulx's major writings include the novel L'Appel de la race (1922); Histoire de la Confédération; Notre grande aventure (1958); Histoire du Canada français (1951), and Notre maître le passé.

=== Writings on New France ===
In order to inculcate pride in a nation he considered degraded by Conquest, Groulx engaged in national myth-making, celebrating the days of New France as a golden age and elevating Dollard des Ormeaux into a legendary hero. He has been described as the first French Canadian historian to consider the period of French colonial rule superior to that of the British control that followed it, evaluating the conquest of New France as a disaster rather than the common 19th-century Canadian view of it as a 'blessing' that saved Quebec from the atheist terrors of the French Revolution.

He also developed a Quebec history curriculum that glorified French colonization in Canada, the difficulties imposed upon the Canadiens by the conquest of New France, and how these were countered by lengthy political struggles for democratic rights. He insisted, as had many before him, on the Quebec Act of 1774 as the official recognition of his nation's rights. He bore particular affection for the undertaking of Robert Baldwin and Louis-Hippolyte Lafontaine, that in 1849 successfully restored the rights of the French language along with the obtention of responsible government, thus thwarting the assimilation plans of Lord Durham's policy of a union between the colonies of Upper and Lower Canada.

He received the Royal Society of Canada's J. B. Tyrrell Historical Medal in 1948.

=== Ligue d'action française ===
At the Ligue d'Action française, Groulx and his colleagues hoped to inspire revival of the French language and French Canadian culture, but also to create a think tank and public space of reflection, so that the French Canadian nation's elites would find ways to remedy French Canada's underdevelopment and exclusion from big business.

Some collaborators of the review thus actively participated in the development of the HEC business school. Others were actively involved in the promotion of the Church's Social doctrine, an official Catholic answer to socio-economic distress that was meant to prevent the appeal of socialism and improve capitalism.

Groulx's conservative Catholicism was not very appreciative of other religions, although he also acknowledged that racism was not Christian, and he maintained that Quebec should aspire to be a model society by Christian standards, including intense missionary action.

=== Catholic social teaching ===
This Catholic social doctrine later became part of the 1930s Action liberale nationale (ALN) party, a new party that intellectuals close to Groulx and the defunct Action française appreciated. When Maurice Duplessis's victory became apparent, some instead accepted to cooperate with his government and its reforms. But Groulx, and with him a large number of intellectuals, chose to oppose him.

During the Second World War Groulx, like many Canadien nationalists, spoke in favour of the Vichy regime of Philippe Pétain, although public statements to this effect remained rare.

Groulx and other intellectuals settled into a partial alliance with Liberal Party of Quebec leader Adelard Godbout, who served as Premier from 1939 to 1944. They soon broke with him on account of his submission to the federal Liberals. Yet in 1944 they opposed Duplessis again, this time placing their hopes in another new party, the Bloc populaire Canadien, led by André Laurendeau. Future Montreal Mayor Jean Drapeau was part of this young party, which soon suffered the same fate as the previous third party, the ALN. After the 1948 election, the Bloc populaire Canadien disappeared.

=== Flag of Quebec ===
Groulx helped with the adoption of the Flag of Quebec.

=== Economic protectionism ===
Groulx was later remembered both for his strong case in favour of the economic advancement of French Canadians in Quebec, defense of the French language, and pioneer work as the first chair of Canadian history in Quebec. Groulx founded the Institut d'histoire d'Amérique française in 1946, an institute located in Montreal devoted to the historical study of Quebec and of the French presence in the Americas and the publication of La revue d'histoire de l'Amérique française, still today arguably the main publication for professional historians in Quebec. His main intellectual contribution was to create a rapprochement between nationalism and the Catholic religion, blunting the hostility between nationalists and the Church that had existed in the nineteenth century.

=== Later influence ===
Through his writings and teaching at the university and his association with the intellectual elite of Quebec, he had a profound influence on many people (such as Michel Chartrand and Camille Laurin). However, many of the young intellectuals he influenced often did not share his conservative ideology (such as his successor at the University of Montreal). Groulx's traditionalist, religious form of Québécois nationalism, known as clerico-nationalism, influenced Quebec society into the 1950s.

Collège Lionel-Groulx, Lionel Groulx Avenue and the Lionel Groulx metro station are named in his honour.

In June 2020, in the wake of global anti-racism and anti-police brutality protests, a group of Montrealers launched a petition asking the city government to rename the Lionel-Groulx Metro station after the African-Canadian jazz pianist Oscar Peterson. Supporters believed that Groulx should not be honoured because he had made antisemitic remarks against Jewish immigrants in Montreal. Since Petersen grew up in the Little Burgundy area of Montreal where the station is located, they considered him a better candidate for the honour.

A counter petition also circulated, asking Montreal to retain the name, claiming that deleting Groulx's name from the station would be "a consent to amnesia and a reshaping of our past." The city kept the status quo, asserting that a moratorium on changing station names had been in place since 2006.

== Antisemitism ==
Accusations of antisemitism were made by Canadian author Mordecai Richler and French-Canadian historian Esther Delisle in the 1990s against several pre-World War II Quebec intellectuals, including Groulx.

In 1933, writing under the pseudonym Jacques Brassier in the article "So That We May Live..." [Pour qu'on vive..."], published in the journal L'Action nationale [National Action], Groulx stated his opposition to antisemitism. In the section "The Jewish Problem" [Le problème juif], he states, "Antisemitism is not only not a Christian solution [to the Jewish problem], it is a solution that is negative and ridiculous." ["L'antisémitisme, non seulement n'est pas une solution chrétienne; c'est une solution négative et niaise"] (trans. Robinson 101). Apologists for Groulx have cited that quotation. However, the following sentence of the article has Groulx go on to give his unequivocal support to the boycott of Jewish businesses in Quebec: "To resolve the Jewish problem, it would suffice if French Canadians regained their common sense. There is no need of extraordinary legislation; no need for violence of any sort. We will only give our people the order, 'Do not buy from the Jews'. ... And if by some miracle our order were understood and complied with, then in six months the Jewish problem would be solved, not merely in Montréal but from one end of the province to the other" (trans. Robinson 101–102). Thus, put into context, although he stops short of advocating the legislation of outright antisemitic policies and supporting violence against Jews, Groulx supported systemic antisemitism by giving French Canadians the "order" to boycott Jewish businesses to solve the "Jewish problem" in Quebec.

Citing Groulx's assertion that antisemitism is "negative and ridiculous", some scholars have downplayed allegations of antisemitism against Groulx. In a speech given in 1999, the historian Xavier Gélinas argues that Groulx did not support "racial anti-Semitism", which "confronts Jews for being Jews." While acknowledging the problematic and antisemitic nature of Groulx's rhetoric, Gélinas claims that it represents "cultural anti-Semitism" that singles out Jews because of the "principles and customs that they are deemed, rightly or wrongly, to believe in and to practice" and are "opposed to the traditional nationalist vision of Quebec."
