= Solomon Gursky Was Here =

1989 novel by Mordecai Richler

- First edition
- Author: Mordecai Richler
- Language: English
- Publisher: Viking Canada
- Publication date: 1989
- Publication place: Canada
- Media type: Print
- Pages: 557
- ISBN: 0-670-82526-3

Solomon Gursky Was Here is a novel by Canadian author Mordecai Richler first published by Viking Canada in 1989.

== Summary ==
The novel tells of several generations of the fictional Gursky family, who are connected to several disparate events in the history of Canada, including the Franklin Expedition and rum-running. Some fans and critics have cited this as Mordecai Richler's best book, and in terms of scope and style it is unmatched by his other works. The parallels between the Gursky family and the Bronfmans are such that the novel "may be seen as a thinly disguised account of the [Bronfman] family". While Richler himself denied any similarities, "one longtime Bronfman associate put it, 'I don't know why Mordecai bothered to change the names.'"

== Synopsis ==
The tale centres on Moses Berger, an alcoholic failed writer who is obsessed with Solomon Gursky, the brother of Bernard and Morrie and absent from the family empire after a fatal plane crash. It is implied that it is disappointment with his own father, the failed poet L. B. Berger, with whom Moses has a deeply dysfunctional relationship that put him on the trail of Solomon, a character as strong-willed as he was mysterious.

Solomon Gursky is told in a non-linear fashion, jumping around in both Moses' personal timeline as well as through four generations of the legendary Gursky family. Though much of the story is told from Moses' perspective, parts are also told from the perspectives of different members of the family and the people attached to them, creating a much more ambiguous picture of the Gurskys.

== Critical reception ==
Reviewing the book in The New York Times, Francine Prose noted, "In this, his ninth and most complex novel, Mr. Richler, a Canadian, is after something ambitious and risky, something slightly Dickensian, magical realist", adding that, "Regardless of what its author may actually have experienced, Solomon Gursky Was Here reads as if it were great fun to write. Dense, intricately plotted, it takes exuberant, nose-thumbing joy in traditional storytelling with all its nervy cliffhangers and narrative hooks, its windfall legacies, stolen portraits, murders and revenges, its clues that drop on the story line with a satisfying thud".

However, Prose judged that, "while the novel's plot turns are seldom predictable, its characters often are: the bigot is a repressed religious nut, the millionaire a pompous slob and, most upsettingly, the Eskimos a bunch of whoop-em-up mystic blubber-chewers and wife-swappers. Though being Jewish apparently enables Mr. Richler to feel on safe ground with outrageous Jewish jokes, he is, so to speak, on much thinner ice here".

Nevertheless, Prose found that in "the book's final paragraph, we discover that Solomon Gursky (and Mordecai Richler) have shaped their clever plot in a perfect circle, a narrative design that restores order and brings a welcome reassurance of closure, two things we so rarely expect from life and cherish, all the more, in the novel".
