= Cocksure =

Book by Mordecai Richler

- First edition cover
- Author: Mordecai Richler
- Publisher: McClelland and Stewart
- Publication date: 1968

Cocksure is a novel by Mordecai Richler. It was first published in 1968 by McClelland and Stewart.

A satirical work, the novel centres on Mortimer Griffin, a middle-class Anglican from Caribou, Ontario who has built a successful career as a publisher and editor in 1960s London, England. When a Hollywood mogul buys Griffin's publishing house, Griffin is suddenly forced to confront the potential impact that not being Jewish may have on his career and his sex life.

In Ninety-nine Novels, Anthony Burgess named Cocksure one of his personal selections for the best novels of the previous four decades. The novel was also selected for competition in the 2006 edition of Canada Reads, where it was championed by comedian Scott Thompson.

The book caused a sensation when it was declared by some as obscene and was banned by WHSmith in Britain as well as by stores in Australia, Ireland, New Zealand and South Africa.

== Criticism ==
Cocksure and Richler's contemporaneous essay collection Hunting Tigers Under Glass were jointly awarded the 1968 Governor General's Award (Fiction and Essays). The novel was considered by many critics, however, as an amusing jape rather than serious satire. Writing in The New York Times, Canadian writer Marian Engel called it "smart-alecky stuff [that] doesn't cut any deeper than the Sunday-paper set it's aimed at".

== References to notable events and personalities ==
- Mortimer Griffin watches as Kenneth Tynan uses the word "fuck" for the first time on British television during a BBC debate on censorship.
- Mortimer and his pub mates discuss the Profumo affair.
- The novels of Harold Robbins inform the conversations on sex at the Eight Bells pub.
- Mortimer Griffin tries to understand why he thinks about Gordie Howe while making love to his wife.
- Mortimer Griffin, contemplating the ugliness of his own ethnicity, compares the graceful black American boxer Cassius Clay with the uninspiring white English boxer Henry Cooper.
- Ramsay MacDonald, Nye Bevan, and Nkrumah represent the socialist radicals of Lord Woodcock's generation.
- "The Star Maker admires nobody, except" the Chevalier d'Éon.
