= Jacob Richler =

Canadian journalist

- Born: England
- Occupations: Essayist, writer
- Father: Mordecai Richler
- Relatives: Noah Richler, brother; Martha Richler, sister; Emma Richler, sister; Daniel Richler, brother

Jacob Richler is a Canadian newspaper and magazine journalist, and the son of novelist Mordecai Richler and Florence Isabel (Wood). He was the inspiration for his father's Jacob Two-Two trilogy of children's books.

He was born in England and raised in Montreal, where he attended Selwyn House School in Westmount.

He was married to Globe and Mail journalist Leanne Delap, from whom he was divorced in 2005.

Richler was a long-time restaurant reviewer for the National Post, known for his biting, highly critical reviewing style, though he is no longer listed under that newspaper's columnists directory and has not contributed an article to the newspaper since early 2007. Richler has also been a columnist and feature writer for Saturday Night, Financial Post Magazine and Toronto Life, as well as a contributor to GQ, Canadian Living, Fashion, Flare, Maclean's and enRoute. He also collaborated with chef Susur Lee on the book Susur: A Culinary Life. Since 2015, he has been the editor-in-chief of Canada's 100 Best, a magazine that releases an annual list of 100 best restaurants in Canada.

== Bibliography ==
- My Canada Includes Foie Gras: A Culinary Life (Toronto: Viking Canada, 2012)
