= Joshua Then and Now =

1980 novel by Mordecai Richler

First edition (publ. McClelland & Stewart)

Joshua Then and Now is a Canadian novel written by Mordecai Richler, published in 1980 by McClelland and Stewart. A semi-autobiographical novel, the book is based his life on his neighborhood growing up in Montreal, Quebec, and tells of the life of a writer. Richler later adapted the novel into the feature film Joshua Then and Now, starring James Woods, Alan Arkin, and Gabrielle Lazure; directed by Ted Kotcheff who had previously directed Richler's The Apprenticeship of Duddy Kravitz.

== Synopsis ==
Joshua Shapiro, successful writer and pundit, lying in a hospital room, seems to have lost his wife and is in the middle of a sex scandal. Compelled to find meaning in his life, he reviews it from his youth to the present day.

Joshua grew up as a Jew in the working class St. Urbain Street area in Montreal. His upbringing was unusual because his father was a boxer who had become a gentle crook and his mother was a strip-tease dancer. Embarrassingly, she strips for his friends as part of a Bar Mitzvah party for him. Joshua's father is revealed to have a unique perspective on life, sex, and religion.

A trip to Spain as a young man is the impetus that sparks a career as a journalist and writer. In England in a momentary lapse of reason, Joshua forges letters about a (fake) homosexual affair with a British writer to sell to an American university archive. He meets an upper-class Canadian married to a poser of a communist and steals her away to become his own wife. She is the daughter of a Canadian senator and Joshua's key into a level of society of which he is quite contemptuous.

In the meantime, Joshua's childhood friends have become successful in their own right. They soon become targets of pranks as he settles various scores.

Joshua's conceited brother-in-law assumes a pivotal role in the novel as it is revealed that he is insecure and vulnerable. Neighbors in the wealthy cottage community around Lake Memphremagog lead him astray with dreadful consequences. Past indiscretions rear their ugly heads and Joshua must put together the shambles of his life.

== Notes ==
- Selected by Time as one of the five best novels of 1980.
- A 1983 CBC Radio dramatization of the novel, starring Saul Rubinek in the title role, received two ACTRA Award nominations at the 13th ACTRA Awards in 1984, for Best Radio Program and Best Actor in a Radio Program (Rubinek).

== Editions ==
- McClelland & Stewart, 1980, hardcover, ISBN 0-7710-7492-1
- Knopf, 1980, First Edition, hardcover, 435 pg., ISBN 0-394-49351-6
- Paperback editions: Bantam 1981, Granada 1982, Bantam Canada 1985, Penguin USA 1991, McLelland & Stewart 1991, Emblem 2001, Buchet-Chastel 2004.Joshua Then and Now by Mordecai Richler
- New Canadian Library (McClelland & Stewart), 1989, 441 p. ISBN 0-7710-9864-2
- Joshua au passé, au présent. Translated by Paule Noyart. Montréal: Les Quinze, 1989. 537 p., ISBN 2-89026-386-X
