= Martha Richler =

Artist and radio presenter

- Born: October 11, 1964 (age 62); London, England
- Known for: Cartoonist and radio presenter
- Father: Mordecai Richler
- Relatives: Jacob Richler, brother Noah Richler, brother Emma Richler, sister Daniel Richler, brother

Martha Richler (born October 11, 1964) is a British cartoonist, art historian, and radio presenter. She is the daughter of writer Mordecai Richler and Florence Isabel (née Wood). Richler works as under the pen-name "Marf" as a cartoonist and radio presenter.

== Biography ==
Richler was born in London, England, and moved to Montreal, Canada in 1972 with her family. She completed her MA in Radio Production at Birmingham City University, studying with the music documentary maker Sam J. Coley. She holds degrees in art history from Harvard University, Columbia University, New York University, and Johns Hopkins University.

Richler wrote the official guide to The National Gallery of Art, Washington, DC, before turning to cartooning. While working for the Evening Standard, Richler was the first woman to produce a daily cartoon at Associated Newspapers and for London-based newspapers known collectively as "Fleet Street". Richler produces work for web sites, including cartoons and illustrations non-partisan UK website PoliticalBetting.com and for The Week online, and as an editorial cartoonist for The Jewish Chronicle. Her work has been archived by the British Library and the Victoria and Albert Museum, London, and the Jewish Museum, London.

Richler began radio presenting and music research in 2020, and began hosting late-night radio programs for Radio Winchcombe in Gloucestershire, spotlighting female musicians in the UK. Richler is an ambassador for The F-List for Music, founded by Vick Bain, supporting female musicians across the UK. Richler produced, wrote, and presented a series in 2022 called Inner Voices for Resonance FM, an innovative radio station supporting new and experimental music.
