= The Apprenticeship of Duddy Kravitz (musical) =

The Apprenticeship of Duddy Kravitz is a musical written by David Spencer and Disney composer Alan Menken (eight-time Oscar-winning composer). The play is based on Canadian author Mordecai Richler's 1959 novel of the same name. The musical is a "morality tale" set in 1950s' Montreal, Canada, about 19-year-old Duddy Kravitz, from the Jewish working-class inner city, who is desperate to make his mark and prove himself to his family and community. After his grandfather tells him that "a man without land is nobody," he works and schemes to buy and develop a lakefront property, but his ambition threatens his personal relationships with those who love him, among them a French Canadian girl he meets while working at a summer resort. Duddy often behaves as a "nervy young hustler" but is at the same time fiercely loyal to those whom he loves. He must "ultimately decide what kind of man he's going to be." The story ended on a bleak note with Duddy isolated and morally compromised, having accomplished his goals only by betraying close friends, including his epileptic and paraplegic friend Virgil, and becoming estranged from his grandfather.

An earlier musical adaptation of the same novel called Duddy was scored by Jerry Leiber and Mike Stoller in 1984 and premiered at Edmonton's Citadel Theater in April 1984, with Lonny Price as Duddy. The unconventional combination of the story's dark tones with a musical style confused audiences, who were further antagonized by Mordecai Richler's dismissive opinion of Edmonton in newspapers. Although the show intended a cross-country run through Canada, poor ticket sales and savage press reviews resulted in the play fizzling by the time it reached Ottawa's National Arts Centre, whereupon it was cancelled before performing in Toronto or even its Montreal setting, losing backers an estimated $500,000.

The same producer, Sam Gesser, hired Menken and Spencer to write the songs for a new adaptation, with book and direction by Austin Pendleton. The play opened in October 1987 in Philadelphia, also starring Price in the title role. Ultimately it was again a troubled production as cast and backers feuded over revising the dark ending to please audiences; the play failed to reach New York theaters.

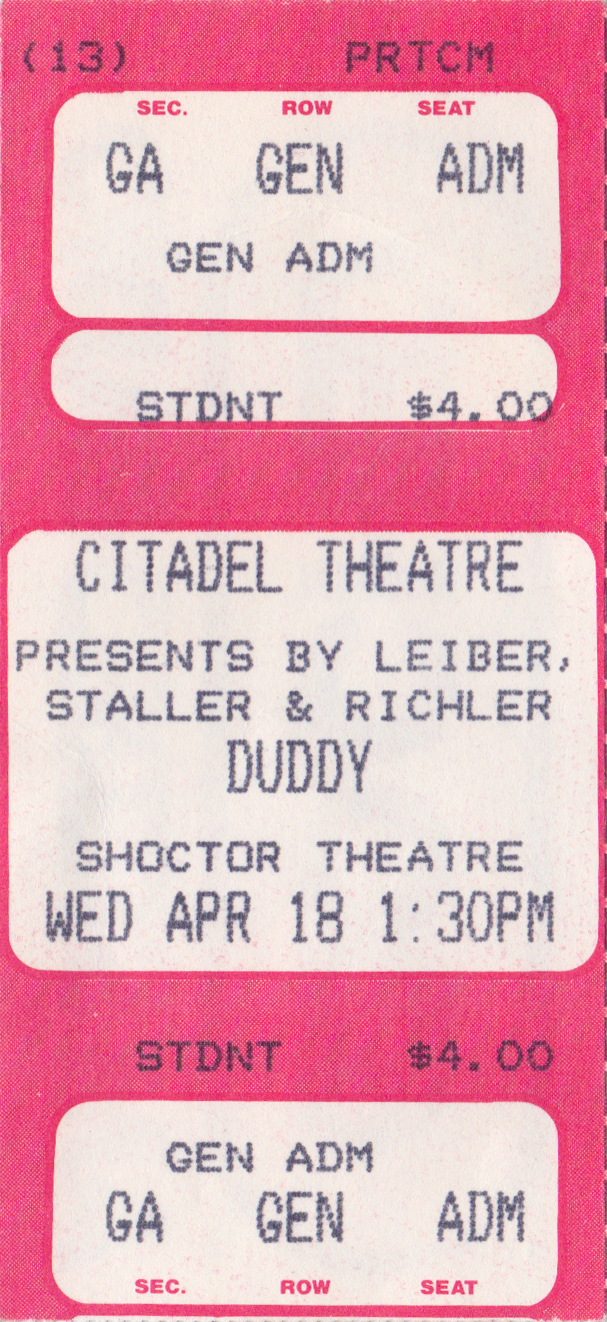
Ticket to "Duddy," April 18, 1984 in Edmonton, Canada

After the second adaptation's failure the play's writers decided to re-investigate the material and soften the ending, although Richler died in 2001 never having seen the final changes. Spencer took over as librettist, starting his adaptation from scratch (he would refer to it as "an altogether different musical with the same title"). Approximately 3/4 of the original score was dropped, most of the rest was revised in favor of the new structure, and the piece went through constant refinement as it was worked on over some twenty years.

In June 2015 after refusals from several theaters the new version had its premiere in Montreal at the Segal Center for Performing Arts. This production was directed again by Pendleton and featured a cast headed by Ken James Stewart (Duddy), George Masswohl (Max Kravitz), Marie-Pierre de Brienne (Yvette Durelle), and including Howard Jerome, Adrian Marchuk, Victor A. Young, David Coomber, Sam Rosenthal, Michael Rudder, Kristian Truelsen, Albane Chateau, Gab Desmond, Julia Halfyard, Michael Esposito II, and Michael Daniel Murphy. The sold-out engagement received mostly positive-to-rave reviews and was twice extended, and an original cast album was released in December 2016 on the Ghostlight label.
