= Noah Richler =

Canadian author, journalist, and broadcaster

- Born: Montreal, Quebec, Canada
- Occupations: Essayist, writer
- Father: Mordecai Richler
- Relatives: Jacob Richler, brother Martha Richler, sister Emma Richler, sister Daniel Richler, brother

Noah Richler is a Canadian author, journalist, and broadcaster who was raised in Montreal, Quebec, Canada and London, England. He is the son of Canadian novelist Mordecai Richler.

Richler worked for many years as a radio documentary producer for BBC Radio, representing the organization at the Prix Futura and winning a Sony Award before following in his father's footsteps and becoming a writer. After returning to Canada in 1998, he was the books editor and then the literary columnist for the National Post. His book This Is My Country, What's Yours? A Literary Atlas of Canada won the 2007 British Columbia's National Award for Canadian Non-Fiction. The book is a literary travelogue and cultural portrait of the country, for which he interviewed novelists and storytellers from Newfoundland to British Columbia and the Inuit Arctic. He also produced and presented a ten-part series for the CBC Radio program Ideas based on his research.

He has contributed to numerous publications in Britain, including The Guardian, Punch and The Daily Telegraph, and in Canada, The Walrus, Maisonneuve, Saturday Night, the Toronto Star, and The Globe and Mail.

He lives in Toronto with his wife, House of Anansi Press publisher Sarah MacLachlan. Richler stood as a candidate for the New Democratic Party in the electoral district of Toronto—St. Paul's in the 2015 federal election. He came third as Carolyn Bennett, St. Paul's' long-serving Liberal Member of Parliament, was re-elected. In 2016 he published The Candidate: Fear and Loathing on the Campaign Trail, a memoir of his experience on the campaign trail. The book was a shortlisted finalist for the 2016 Shaughnessy Cohen Prize for Political Writing.

== Electoral record ==
2015 Canadian federal election: Toronto—St. Paul's
Party	Candidate	Votes	%	±%	Expenditures
Liberal	Carolyn Bennett	31,481	55.26	+15.33	$128,256.52
Conservative	Marnie MacDougall	15,376	26.99	-5.43	$186,719.71
New Democratic	Noah Richler	8,386	14.72	-7.91	$53,022.76
Green	Kevin Farmer	1,729	3.03	-1.44	$3,643.09
Total valid votes/Expense limit		56,972	99.56		$210,412.41
Total rejected ballots		252	0.44		
Turnout		57,224	72.54	–	
Eligible voters		78,885			
Liberal hold		Swing		+10.38	
Source: Elections Canada
