= Emma Richler =

British-Canadian writer

- Born: 1961 (age 64–65); London, England
- Occupation: writer
- Years active: 2000s–present
- Known for: Sister Crazy, Feed My Dear Dogs
- Father: Mordecai Richler
- Relatives: Jacob Richler, brother Noah Richler, brother Martha Richler, sister Daniel Richler, brother

Emma Richler (born 1961) is a British/Canadian writer.

== Biography ==
Born in London, England, she is the daughter of author Mordecai Richler. She moved with her family to Montreal, Quebec in 1972. She briefly attended the University of Toronto before transferring to Universite de Provence to complete her education.

She first worked as an actress, performing in stage, film and television roles in both Canada and England until 1996, for example playing the young nurse in the Screen Two adaptation of Memento Mori. She later worked in publishing before publishing her debut short story collection Sister Crazy in 2001. The book was a shortlisted nominee for the Jewish Quarterly-Wingate Prize in 2002.

Her first novel, Feed My Dear Dogs, was published in 2005. Her second, Be My Wolff, was published in 2017.
