= Daniel Richler =

Canadian arts and pop culture broadcaster and writer

- Born: Daniel Mann; 1957 (age 68–69); London, England
- Occupations: Broadcaster, writer
- Years active: 1980s-present
- Known for: The NewMusic, The Journal, Kicking Tomorrow
- Relatives: Mordecai Richler, adoptive stepfather Jacob Richler, brother Noah Richler, brother Emma Richler, sister Martha Richler, sister

Daniel Richler (born 1957) is a Canadian arts and pop culture broadcaster and writer.

== Biography ==
Richler was born in London, England. His biological father is screenwriter Stanley Mann. His mother, Florence Wood, divorced Mann when Daniel was two years old, and married Mordecai Richler in 1960. The family moved back to Montreal, Quebec — the hometown of both Florence and Mordecai — in 1972 when Daniel was 15.

He became a punk rocker as a teenager and was lead singer of the punk rock band Alpha Jerks. He also joined the Ontario biker gang The New Hegelians as an honorary member, despite not actually owning a motorcycle.

== Career ==
From 1977 through the early 1980s, Richler was a deejay, presenter and critic on a variety of major market radio stations including CHOM-FM in Montreal, and CJCL and CFNY-FM in Toronto. In his early radio career, he used his birth name, Daniel Mann, to avoid trading on his stepfather's fame. He also joined the Canadian Broadcasting Corporation, where he was a cultural commentator on CBC Radio's Morningside with Peter Gzowski.

He moved to CITY-TV in 1985, becoming co-host and eventually producer of The NewMusic, the internationally syndicated, pioneering weekly rockumentary show that pre-dated MTV and later gave rise to MuchMusic. The show fused international field journalism and in-depth interviews with rock videos to create an occasionally tough rockumentary newsmagazine geared at 15- to 30-year-olds. Items and documentaries included those on Band-Aid, post-revolutionary music in Zimbabwe, the Japanese pop industry, Andy Warhol's art video work, William Burroughs, Frank Zappa at the Parents Music Resource Center hearings in Washington, the death and legacy of Bob Marley, Yoko Ono post-John, and Malcolm McLaren's manufacture and manipulation of the Sex Pistols.

In 1987 and 1988 Richler was chief arts correspondent on The Journal, CBC's national news program. His international profiles and docs included those on Anthony Burgess, Keith Richards, Art Spiegelman, Pat Nixon and numerous others. He subsequently moved to TVOntario where he became creative head of arts programming, and launched the long-running literary program Imprint, which he later served as host and executive producer. At that time Richler also oversaw the schedule, acquisitions, commissioning and original programming of the channel's arts sector. He developed and launched Prisoners of Gravity with Mark Askwith and host/comedian Rick Green, and commissioned Peter Vronsky's 1991 feature documentary film Mondo Moscow.

He published a novel, Kicking Tomorrow, in 1991. The book was named one of New York Times Book Review's Best Books of 1992.

In the mid-to-late 1990s he was producer, director and presenter of the counterculture show Big Life on CBC Newsworld. Subjects included trepanation, anti-genetically modified food activism, digital downloading, auto-erotic asphyxiation, the Furries, anti-G8 anarchism, Burning Man, Genesis P-Orridge, the true nature and history of ecstasy, turntablism, etc. In 1998, he won the Gemini Award for Best Host in a Lifestyle, Variety, or Performing Arts Program or Series for his work on Big Life.

In 2001 he moved back to ChumCity as editor-in-chief and executive producer of its new literary specialty channel BookTelevision, which launched on September 1, 2001 as a digital service across Canada. There he conceived and developed the channel format, oversaw development of its schedule, budget of original in-house programming, acquisition selection and overall design. He served as executive producer and/or director for The Word News, The Word This Week, Richler, Ink., Writers on the Road, Authors at Harbourfront, Lust, The Electric Archive and a variety of full-length documentaries.

He left BookTelevision in 2004 to move to London, after his wife Jill Offman accepted a senior position with Discovery Channel UK. In the United Kingdom, he has been a writer and director of television documentaries, including How Do They Do It? and Real Vampires, and has continued as an occasional contributor of feature journalism to Canadian newspapers such as the National Post and The Globe and Mail. He returned to Canadian broadcasting in 2015 with a week-long stint as a guest host of CBC Radio's Q.
