= The Call of the Race =

Book by Lionel Groulx

- Author: Pierre Hébert, Marie-Pier Luneau
- Original title: L'appel de la race
- Language: French
- Publisher: Fides, [Saint-Laurent, Québec]
- Publication date: [1922] 1996
- Pages: 204
- ISBN: 9782762118674
- OCLC: 36417425

The Call of the Race (L'Appel de la race) is a book by Québécois priest and historian Lionel Groulx. The plot follows the struggle of Ottawa lawyer Jules de Lanatagnac, an anglicized French-Canadian who becomes a nationalist and joins the fight against Ontario's Regulation 17 to save French language schools in the province.

== Plot summary ==
The story begins when Jules de Lantagnac, an Ottawa lawyer of French Quebec origin, visits his Gatineau priest after a pilgrimage to his native childhood village of Saint-Michel. Lantagnac reveals to Father Fabien that his pilgrimage has transformed him: where he was once an anglicized French-Canadian, he has become a French Canadian patriot and has sworn to return his family to its French and Catholic roots. The activist priest, Father Fabien, pleased, persuades the lawyer to join the struggle of the Franco-Ontarians against Regulation 17, the Ontario law aimed at eliminating the teaching of French in schools.

When Lantagnac returns to his Anglo-Saxon wife and his four children in Ottawa's Sandy Hill, he informs them of his rediscovery of French-Canadian culture. He takes his family on visits to Quebec and begins teaching them French, struggling with their adherence to the Parisian dialect, as well as the distaste of his wife Maud, his elder daughter Nellie, and youngest son William. His elder son, Wolfred-André responds more favourably to his father's wishes, pursuing education in French in Montreal, while his younger daughter, Virginia, fully embraces French Canadian nationalism, attending history and language classes at a convent on Rideau Street in Ottawa.

In the meantime, Lantagnac struggles with developments in the Ontario schools conflict. Inspired by the resignation of a Senator Landry in protest of Regulation 17, and persuaded by Father Fabien, Lantagnac decides to run as an independent candidate in the by-election in the Franco-Ontarian federal elector district of Russell in Eastern Ontario. He reveals this decision to his family during the visit of brother-in-law William Duffin, an Irish-Canadian lawyer who, like Lantagnac, was born in Quebec and fluent in French. Duffin, portrayed by Groulx as thoroughly anglicized and assimilated, passionately defends Resolution 17 in a debate with Virginia, condemning the actions of protest by the Franco-Ontarian community. Lantagnac enters the debate and refutes Duffin's arguments. However, this and his announcement of his candidacy thoroughly distresses Maud and Nellie who continue to embrace Anglo-Saxon rule.

Lantagnac wins the election and uses his victory to advance the Franco-Ontarian cause, defending French rights in Parliament passionately and serving his constituents with force. He earns the respect of the Francophone community. However, his advocacy of French rights and his part in the struggle worries his in-laws who see him as an agitator and a danger to Anglo-Saxon dominance. His father in law and his wife both confront him and argue against his activism.

Soon after, Lantagnac faces a scandal when his son William, who has stayed at the English Loyola College, participates in a debate and argue in defence of Resolution 17, putting further strain on the Lantagnac family. Wolfred writes to his father a consolation condemning his brother's actions.

Lantagnac faces further trouble and pressures at home, but does not relent from his cause. William Duffin, who has become an anti-French activist, devises a scheme with government politicians to stop Lantagnac. First, he attempts to persuade Lantagnac that the French struggle is too extreme, and that Lantagnac would do well to play the role of a peacemaker and to avoid speaking in a key debate on 11 May. Second, he arranges to trick Lantagnac into resigning from his employment at the Aitkens Brothers law firm, in the hope that the loss of income would push Lantagnac to accept an "honour" from the government for financial security in exchange for abstention from his activism.

Lantagnac resigns and Duffin takes his place, outraging Virginia, who by this time is an ardent French-Canadian nationalist and devout Catholic. The tension at home begins to take its toll on Lantagnac, who considers abstaining from the debate in spite of its offense to his honour. To justify this he begins to believe Duffin's advice. This is worsened by his wife's veiled threats that his participation in the debate on behalf of the French cause would only lead to their separation. Moved by this, Lantagnac on the eve of the debate asks Father Fabien advice, who, while understanding the pain of his predicament, still urges Lantagnac to participate. Lantagnac, leaving Father Fabien, overhears his elder son's name mentioned by Montreal Francophone university students admiring the Parliament Hill statue of Baldwin and LaFontaine, the "architects of Canada's freedom". He resolves to take part in the debate until later that night he finds his wife faints.

The morning of the debate day, Lantagnac attends a moving mass with Virginia attended also by thousands of children who pray and perform communion to save their schools. Lantagnac, who had decided against speaking the debate, goes to Parliament to take his seat, observe and applaud. Until the very last second he remains determined to not speak, but, hearing the words of French activists, (including Wilfrid Laurier), he is moved to deliver a stirring speech in defence of French schools and culture.

The speech however, has its consequences. Maud and Nellie leave, with Maud promising to respect her children's freedom. Virginia tells Lantagnac that she will enter the convent to become a nun; she will spend a few weeks with her father in his home village before this but will spend a few final days with her mother. Lantagnac finds William's room empty as well, with only an unread copy of "L'avenir du peuple canadien-français" (The Future of the French-Canadian People)defaced on the first page with "Rule Britannia for ever." Lantagnac feels alone.

Lantagnac's eldest son arrives as well however from Montreal. He asks his father to bless him and announces that like his father, he is French in soul and proud of his French-Canadian heritage. He tells his father that from that point on, Wolfred is gone and he only André de Lantagnac.
