= The Apprenticeship of Duddy Kravitz (film) =

1974 Canadian film

- Theatrical release poster
- Directed by: Ted Kotcheff
- Screenplay by: Mordecai Richler
- Adaptation by: Lionel Chetwynd
- Based on: The Apprenticeship of Duddy Kravitz by Mordecai Richler
- Produced by: John Kemeny
- Starring: Richard Dreyfuss; Micheline Lanctôt; Randy Quaid; Joseph Wiseman; Denholm Elliott; Joe Silver; Jack Warden
- Cinematography: Brian West
- Edited by: Thom Noble
- Music by: Stanley Myers; Andrew Powell
- Production companies: International Cinemedia Center; Canadian Film Development Corporation; Welco United Canada; Famous Players; Astral-Bellevue-Pathé; The Duddy Kravitz Syndicate
- Distributed by: Astral Films (Canada)
- Release date: April 11, 1974
- Running time: 120 minutes
- Country: Canada
- Language: English
- Budget: $910,000
- Box office: $1.7 million (US/Canada rentals)

The Apprenticeship of Duddy Kravitz is a 1974 Canadian comedy drama film directed by Ted Kotcheff, and adapted by Mordechai Richler and Lionel Chetwynd from Richler's 1959 novel. It stars Richard Dreyfuss as the title character, a brash young Jewish Montrealer who embarks on a string of get-rich-quick schemes in a bid to gain respect. The cast also features Micheline Lanctôt, Randy Quaid, Joseph Wiseman, Denholm Elliott, Joe Silver and Jack Warden.

Winner of the Golden Bear at the 24th Berlin International Film Festival, The Apprenticeship of Duddy Kravitz has been described as a 'coming of age' for Canadian cinema, as it was both a widespread critical and commercial success internationally. It won the Canadian Film Award for Film of the Year, and was nominated for an Academy Award for Best Adapted Screenplay and a Golden Globe Award for Best Foreign Film. The film has been designated as a "masterwork" by the Audio-Visual Preservation Trust of Canada.

== Plot ==
Duddy Kravitz is a brash young Jewish man growing up in poverty in post-war Montreal. His cab driver father Max and his rich uncle Benjy are proud of Duddy's older brother Lenny, whom Benjy is putting through medical school. Only his grandfather shows the motherless Duddy any attention.

Duddy gets a summer job as a waiter at a kosher resort hotel in the Laurentian Mountains. His hustle and coarse manners irritate fellow waiter Irwin. Irwin gets his girlfriend Linda, the daughter of the hotel's owner, to persuade Duddy to stage a clandestine roulette game. Unbeknownst to Duddy, the roulette wheel is crooked, and he loses his $300 earnings to Irwin and some hotel guests. The other waiters make Irwin give back the money. Unaware of this, the hotel guests feel bad and give him a further $500.

Duddy starts a romantic relationship with another hotel employee, French Canadian Yvette. One day, Yvette takes him on a picnic by a lake. Duddy decides he will buy all the property around the lake and develop it. Because he is under 21 and the owners might not want to sell to a Jew, he gets Yvette to front for him.

Duddy sets out to raise the money he needs. He hires blacklisted alcoholic film director Petr John Friar to film weddings and bar mitzvahs. The first film is a success, and more orders are quickly forthcoming.

When a piece of land comes up for sale, Duddy does not have enough money. He begs his father to get him an appointment with his friend Dingleman, a businessman-cum-gangster who had equally humble beginnings. Dingleman invites him to discuss his scheme on a train to New York but just wants a drug mule to unknowingly take the risk of smuggling heroin.

On the train, Duddy meets Virgil and offers to buy his pinball machines, which are illegal in the United States. Duddy does not have enough money to pay him, so he hires Virgil as a truck driver, even though he has epilepsy. Virgil has a seizure while driving and crashes; he is left paralyzed from the waist down. Blaming Duddy, Yvette leaves him to care for Virgil.

When the last piece of property Duddy needs comes on the market, Dingleman bids for it. Desperate, Duddy forges Virgil's signature on a cheque to buy the land, leading to a rupture with Yvette and Virgil.

Duddy takes Max, Lenny, and his grandfather to see his property. When Dingleman shows up to offer to raise the financing for its development, Duddy mocks him. Duddy's grandfather, however, refuses to pick out a plot for his farm, as Yvette told him what Duddy did to get it. Duddy fails to reconcile with Yvette, who never wants to see him again. In the final scene, Duddy has risen far enough that he can run a tab at the local diner, and his father boasts about how his son made it.

== Cast ==
- Richard Dreyfuss as David "Duddy" or "Duddel" Kravitz
- Micheline Lanctôt as Yvette
- Jack Warden as Max Kravitz, Duddy's father
- Randy Quaid as Virgil
- Joseph Wiseman as Benjy Kravitz, Duddy's uncle
- Alan Rosenthal as Lenny, Duddy's brother
- Alan Migicovsky (billed as Allan Kolman) as Irwin, a rival waiter
- Denholm Elliott as Peter John Friar
- Henry Ramer as Jerry Dingleman
- Joe Silver as Farber
- Zvee Scooler as Zaide, Duddy's grandfather

== Production ==
Lionel Chetwynd was commissioned by John G. Kemeny to write a script based on Mordecai Richler's novel The Apprenticeship of Duddy Kravitz. The first draft was sent to Richler, who then showed it to his friend Ted Kotcheff. Kotcheff said that he would direct the film if Richler wrote the second draft of the script. The film was shot in Montreal from 10 September to 14 November 1973, with an initial budget of $650,000 and a final cost of $910,000 (equivalent to $6,331,441 in 2025). $300,000 came from the Canadian Film Development Corporation and the remaining $650,000 was raised by Gerald Schneider. Miklós Lente was the director of photography for the first two weeks of filming, but was replaced by Brian West.

The film was actually Kotcheff's second adaptation of Richler's 1959 novel. In 1961, he had directed a television play for ITV's Armchair Theatre based on Kravitz, with Hugh Futcher in the title role.

American producer Samuel Z. Arkoff was approached to make the film, but wanted to turn Duddy into a Greek character.

Few Canadians were cast in major roles because the Canadian film industry was underdeveloped at the time.

== Release ==
The Apprenticeship of Duddy Kravitz premiered at the Place des Arts on 11 April 1974, and was theatrically released the next day. The film grossed $60,000 (equivalent to $376,000 in 2025) at the Place Ville Marie and Towne Cinema one week after its release. The film was the most commercially successful English-language Canadian film ever made at the time of its release with a gross of $2.3 million in Canada. Including the U.S., the film earned theatrical rentals of $1.7 million. The CFDC made $334,888 from its investment in the film.

== Reception ==
On Rotten Tomatoes, the film holds a rating of 94% from 16 reviews.

== Legacy ==
Duddy Kravitz has an important place in Canadian film history due to its record gross, and has thus been described as a 'coming of age' for Canadian cinema. The film has been designated and preserved as a "masterwork" by the Audio-Visual Preservation Trust of Canada, a charitable non-profit organization dedicated to promoting the preservation of Canada's audio-visual heritage. The Toronto International Film Festival ranked it in the Top 10 Canadian Films of All Time twice, in 1984 and 1993. A poll by Take One listed The Apprenticeship of Duddy Kravitz as the 4th best film in Canadian history in 1995. Canada Post created postage stamps featuring ten films, including The Apprenticeship of Duddy Kravitz, to mark the 100th anniversary of Canadian cinema in 1996.

In the period between shooting Duddy Kravitz and actually seeing the completed movie, Richard Dreyfuss was offered, and twice turned down, the role of Matt Hooper in Jaws; having read the script he decided that it was a film he would "rather watch than be in". After he had seen the final cut of Kravitz, however, Dreyfuss felt his performance was so bad that it could potentially end his movie career. Discovering that the role of Hooper had still not been cast, he jumped at it to ensure that he was safely under contract to make another movie before anybody at Universal Pictures heard any negative press about Kravitz.

Duddy Kravitz was shown as part of the Cannes Classics section of the 2013 Cannes Film Festival.

== Accolades ==
Award	Date of ceremony	Category	Recipient(s)	Result	Ref.
Berlin International Film Festival	2 July 1974	Golden Bear	The Apprenticeship of Duddy Kravitz	Won	
Canadian Film Awards	October 12, 1975	Film of the Year	The Apprenticeship of Duddy Kravitz	Won	

== Works cited ==
- Spencer, Michael (2003). Hollywood North: Creating the Canadian Motion Picture Industry. Cantos International Publishing. ISBN 289594007X.
- Turner, D. John, ed. (1987). Canadian Feature Film Index: 1913-1985. Canadian Film Institute. ISBN 0660533642.
- Walz, Eugene, ed. (2002). Canada’s Best Features: Critical essays on 15 Canadian films. Brill Publishers. ISBN 978-94-012-0014-1.
