= Mordecai Richler =

Canadian writer (1931–2001)

Mordecai Richler CC
- Richler in the 1960s
- Born: January 27, 1931; Montreal, Quebec, Canada
- Died: July 3, 2001 (aged 70); Montreal, Quebec, Canada
- Resting place: Mount Royal Cemetery
- Citizenship: British subject (before 1946); Canada (after 1946)
- Education: Baron Byng High School; Sir George Williams University
- Occupation: Writer
- Spouses: Catherine Boudreau (m. 1954, divorced) Florence Isabel Mann (née Wood) (m. 1961–2001)
- Children: Daniel; Jacob; Noah; Martha; Emma
- Relatives: Rabbi Yehudah Yudel Rosenberg (grandfather)
- Writing career
- Subject: Canadian Jewish life
- Notable works: The Apprenticeship of Duddy Kravitz; Joshua Then and Now; Barney's Version; St. Urbain's Horseman; Solomon Gursky Was Here; Jacob Two-Two; Oh Canada! Oh Quebec!

Mordecai Richler (January 27, 1931 – July 3, 2001) was a Canadian writer from Montreal, Quebec. He is best known for his novels set in Montreal's Jewish community; including The Apprenticeship of Duddy Kravitz (1959) and Barney's Version (1997). His 1970 novel St. Urbain's Horseman and 1989 novel Solomon Gursky Was Here were nominated for the Booker Prize. He is also well known for the Jacob Two-Two fantasy series for children.

In addition to his fiction, Richler was a journalist, and his non-fiction writing included essays about the Jewish community in Canada, and about Canadian and Quebec nationalism. Richler's Oh Canada! Oh Quebec! (1992), a book version of an essay that originally appeared in The New Yorker, generated considerable controversy.

For his literary and cultural contributions, Richler was awarded Companionship of the Order of Canada in 2001. He was also a two-time recipient of the Governor General's Award for Literature (1968 and 1971), and winner of the Giller Prize (1997). Charles Foran for Historica Canada called Richler "without question one of Canada's greatest writers."

== Biography ==
=== Early life and education ===
The son of Lily (née Rosenberg) and Moses Isaac Richler, a scrap metal dealer, Richler was born on January 27, 1931, in Montreal, Quebec, and raised on St. Urbain Street in that city's Mile End area. Richler was fluent in English and Yiddish but had poor French. Richler graduated from Baron Byng High School and enrolled in Sir George Williams College (now Concordia University) to study but did not complete his degree. Years later, Richler's mother published an autobiography which discusses Mordecai's birth and upbringing, and the sometimes difficult relationship between them. Mordecai Richler's grandfather and Lily Richler's father was Rabbi Yehudah Yudel Rosenberg, a celebrated rabbi in both Poland and Canada, chief rabbi of Montreal, and a prolific author of many religious texts, as well as religious fiction and non-fiction works on science and history geared for religious communities.

Richler's parents had had an arranged marriage which his mother deeply resented. She began an affair with a boarder in 1944 and divorced her husband, events which deeply upset the 12-year-old Richler.

Richler moved to Paris at age nineteen, intent on following in the footsteps of a previous generation of literary exiles, the so-called Lost Generation of the 1920s, many of whom were from the United States. Richler considered his time in Paris studying and writing at his favourite café, the Mabillon on St. Germain des Prés, as the equivalent of university years.

=== Career ===
Richler returned to Montreal in 1952, working briefly at the Canadian Broadcasting Corporation, then moved to London in 1954. He published seven of his ten novels, as well as considerable journalism, while living in London.

Worrying "about being so long away from the roots of my discontent", Richler returned to Montreal in 1972. He wrote repeatedly about the Anglophone community of Montreal and especially about his former neighbourhood, portraying it in multiple novels.

=== Marriage and family ===
In England, in 1954, Richler married Catherine Boudreau, nine years his senior. On the eve of their wedding, he met and was smitten by Florence Mann (née Wood), then married to Richler's close friend, screenwriter Stanley Mann.

Some years later Richler and Mann both divorced their prior spouses and married each other, and Richler adopted her son Daniel. The couple had four other children together: Noah, Emma, Martha and Jacob. These events inspired his novel Barney's Version.

Richler died of cancer on July 3, 2001, in Montreal, aged 70.

He was also a second cousin of novelist Nancy Richler.

== Journalism career ==
Throughout his career, Richler wrote journalistic commentary, and contributed to The Atlantic Monthly, Look, The New Yorker, The American Spectator, and other magazines. In his later years, Richler was a newspaper columnist for The National Post and Montreal's The Gazette. In the late 1980s and early 1990s, he authored a monthly book review for Gentlemen's Quarterly.

Richler was often critical of Quebec but of Canadian federalism as well. Another favourite Richler target was the government-subsidized Canadian literary movement of the 1970s and 1980s. Journalism constituted an important part of his career, bringing him income between novels and films.

== The Apprenticeship of Duddy Kravitz ==
Richler published his fourth novel, The Apprenticeship of Duddy Kravitz, in 1959. The book featured a frequent Richler theme: Jewish life in the 1930s and 40s in the neighbourhood of Montreal east of Mount Royal Park including St. Urbain Street and Saint Lawrence Boulevard (or Boulevard Saint Laurent, known colloquially as "The Main"). Richler wrote of the neighbourhood and its people, chronicling the hardships and disabilities they faced as a Jewish minority.

To a middle-class stranger, it is true, one street would have seemed as squalid as the next. On each corner a cigar store, a grocery, and a fruit man. Outside staircases everywhere. Winding ones, wooden ones, rusty and risky ones. Here a prized lot of grass splendidly barbered, there a spitefully weedy patch. An endless repetition of precious peeling balconies and waste lots making the occasional gap here and there.

— The Apprenticeship of Duddy Kravitz, Penguin Books, 1964, p. 13

Following the publication of Duddy Kravitz, according to The Oxford Companion to Canadian Literature, Richler became "one of the foremost writers of his generation".

== Reception ==
Many critics distinguished Richler the author from Richler the polemicist. Richler frequently said his goal was to be an honest witness to his time and place, and to write at least one book that would be read after his death. His work was championed by journalists Robert Fulford and Peter Gzowski, among others. Admirers praised Richler for daring to tell uncomfortable truths; Michael Posner's oral biography of Richler is titled The Last Honest Man (2004).

Critics objected to the way his journalistic writing was incorporated by him into his later novels, apparently seeing this as lazy or redundant. Richler's ambivalent attitude toward Montreal's Jewish community was captured in Mordecai and Me (2003), a book by Joel Yanofsky.

The Apprenticeship of Duddy Kravitz was made into a film, for which Richler wrote the screenplay, and it was performed on stage in several live theatre productions in Canada and the United States.

== Controversy ==
Richler had recurrent conflicts with members of the Quebec nationalist movement. In articles published between the late 1970s and the mid-1990s, Richler criticized Quebec's restrictive language laws and the rise of sovereigntism. Critics took particular exception to Richler's allegations of a long history of antisemitism in Quebec.

Soon after the first election of the Parti Québécois (PQ) in 1976, Richler published "Oh Canada! Lament for a divided country" in the Atlantic Monthly to considerable controversy. In it, he claimed the PQ had borrowed the Hitler Youth song "Tomorrow Belongs to Me" from the musical Cabaret for their anthem "À partir d'aujourd'hui, demain nous appartient" (which translates as "From today, tomorrow belongs to us"), though he later acknowledged his error on the song, blaming himself for having "cribbed" the information from an article by Irwin Cotler and Ruth Wisse published in the American magazine Commentary. Richler apologized for the mistake and called it an "embarrassing gaffe".

In 1992 Richler published Oh Canada! Oh Quebec!: Requiem for a Divided Country, which parodied Quebec's language laws. He commented approvingly on Esther Delisle's The Traitor and the Jew: Anti-Semitism and the Delirium of Extremist Right-Wing Nationalism in French Canada from 1929–1939 (1992), about French-Canadian anti-Semitism in the decade before the start of World War II. Oh Canada! Oh Quebec! was criticized by the Quebec sovereigntist movement and to a lesser degree by other anglophone Canadians. His detractors claimed that Richler had an outdated and stereotyped view of Quebec society and that he risked polarizing relations between francophone and anglophone Quebecers. Sovereigntist Pierrette Venne, later elected as a Bloc Québécois MP, called for the book to be banned. Daniel Latouche compared the book to Mein Kampf.

Nadia Khouri believes that there was a discriminatory undertone in the reaction to Richler, noting that some of his critics characterized him as "not one of us" or that he was not a "real Quebecer". She found that some critics had misquoted his work; for instance, in reference to the mantra of the entwined church and state coaxing females to procreate as vastly as possible, a section in which he said that Quebec women were treated like "sows" was misinterpreted to suggest that Richler thought they were sows. Québécois writers who thought critics had overreacted included Jean-Hugues Roy, Étienne Gignac, Serge-Henri Vicière, and Dorval Brunelle. His defenders asserted that Mordecai Richler may have been wrong on certain specific points, but was certainly not racist nor anti-Québécois. Nadia Khouri acclaimed Richler for his courage and for attacking the orthodoxies of Quebec society. He has been described as "the most prominent defender of the rights of Quebec's anglophones".

Some commentators were alarmed about the strong controversy over Richler's book, saying that it underlines and acknowledges the persistence of anti-Semitism among sections of the Quebec population. Richler received death threats; an anti-Semitic Francophone journalist yelled at one of Richler's sons, "[I]f your father was here, I'd make him relive the Holocaust right now!" An editorial cartoon in L'actualité compared him to Hitler. One critic controversially claimed that Richler had been paid by Jewish groups to write his critical essay on Quebec. His defenders believed this accusation was evoking old stereotypes of Jews. When leaders of the Jewish community were asked to dissociate themselves from Richler, the journalist Frances Kraft said that indicated that they did not consider Richler as part of the Quebec "tribe" because he was Anglo-speaking and Jewish.

About the same time, Richler announced he had founded the "Impure Wool Society," to grant the Prix Parizeau to a distinguished non-Francophone writer of Quebec. The group's name plays on the expression Québécois pure laine, typically used to refer to Quebecker with extensive French-Canadian multi-generational ancestry (or "pure wool"). The prize (with an award of $3000) was granted twice: to Benet Davetian in 1996 for The Seventh Circle, and David Manicom in 1997 for Ice in Dark Water.

In 2010, Montreal city councillor Marvin Rotrand presented a 4,000-signature petition calling on the city to honour Richler on the 10th anniversary of his death with the renaming of a street, park or building in Richler's old Mile End neighbourhood. The council initially denied an honour to Richler, saying it would sacrifice the heritage of their neighbourhood. In response to the controversy, the City of Montreal announced it was to renovate and rename a bandstand, loosely termed a gazebo in media accounts, in his honour. For various reasons, the project stalled for several years but was completed in 2016. Richler has also been honoured with a mural and the renaming of a library.

== Representation in other media ==
- St. Urbain's Horseman (1971) was made into a CBC television drama.
- In 1973 The Apprenticeship of Duddy Kravitz was adapted into a film of the same name starring Richard Dreyfuss as Duddy.
- The Apprenticeship of Duddy Kravitz has repeatedly been adapted as a musical play, i.e. in 1984 (Edmonton, Alberta, Canada), 1987 (Philadelphia), and 2015 (Montreal).
- The animator Caroline Leaf created The Street (1976), based on Richler's 1969 short story of the same name. It was nominated for an Academy Award in animation.
- In 1978 Jacob Two-Two Meets the Hooded Fang was adapted into a theatrical film as Jacob Two-Two Meets the Hooded Fang (1978 film).
- In 1999 Jacob Two-Two Meets the Hooded Fang was again adapted into a theatrical film as Jacob Two Two Meets the Hooded Fang (1999 film).
- In 1985 Joshua Then and Now (1980) was adapted into a film of the same name.
- In 2003 Jacob Two-Two was adapted into an animated series of the same name loosely based on the titular character of the book series.
- In 2009 Barney's Version was adapted for radio by the CBC.
- In 2010 Barney's Version (1997) was adapted into a film of the same name.

== Awards and recognition ==
- 1969 Governor General's Award for Cocksure and Hunting Tigers Under Glass.
- 1972 Governor General's Award for St. Urbain's Horseman.
- 1975 Writers Guild of America Award for Best Comedy for screenplay of The Apprenticeship of Duddy Kravitz.
- 1976 Canadian Library Association Book of the Year for Children Award: Jacob Two-Two Meets the Hooded Fang.
- 1976 Ruth Schwartz Children's Book Award for Jacob Two-Two Meets the Hooded Fang.
- 1990 Commonwealth Writers Prize for Solomon Gursky was Here
- 1995 Mr. Christie's Book Award (for the best English book age 8 to 11) for Jacob Two-Two's First Spy Case.
- 1997 The Giller Prize for Barney's Version.
- 1998 Canadian Booksellers Associations "Author of the Year" award.
- 1998 Stephen Leacock Award for Humour for Barney's Version
- 1998 Commonwealth Writers Prize for Best Book (Canada & Caribbean region) for Barney's Version
- 1998 The QSPELL Award for Barney's Version.
- 2000 Honorary Doctorate of Letters, McGill University, Montreal, Quebec.
- 2000 Honorary Doctorate, Bishop's University, Lennoxville, Quebec.
- 2001 Companion of the Order of Canada
- 2004 Number 98 on the CBC's television show about great Canadians, The Greatest Canadian
- 2004 Barney's Version was chosen for inclusion in Canada Reads 2004, championed by author Zsuzsi Gartner.
- 2006 Cocksure was chosen for inclusion in Canada Reads 2006, championed by actor and author Scott Thompson
- 2011 Richler posthumously received a star on Canada's Walk of Fame and was inducted at the Elgin Theatre in Toronto.
- 2011 In the same month he was inducted into Canada's Walk of Fame, the City of Montreal announced that a gazebo in Mount Royal Park would be refurbished and named in his honour. The structure overlooks Jeanne-Mance Park, where Richler played in his youth.
- 2015 Richler was given his due as a "citizen of honour" in the city of Montreal. The Mile End Library, in the neighbourhood he portrayed in The Apprenticeship of Duddy Kravitz, was given his name.

== Published works ==
=== Novels ===
- The Acrobats (1954) (also published as Wicked We Love, July 1955)
- Son of a Smaller Hero (1955)
- A Choice of Enemies (1957)
- The Apprenticeship of Duddy Kravitz (1959)
- The Incomparable Atuk (1963)
- Cocksure (1968)
- St. Urbain's Horseman (1971)
- Joshua Then and Now (1980)
- Solomon Gursky Was Here (1989)
- Barney's Version (1997)

=== Short story collection ===
- The Street (1969)

=== Fiction for children ===
Jacob Two-Two series

- Jacob Two-Two Meets the Hooded Fang (Alfred A. Knopf, 1975), illustrated by Fritz Wegner
- Jacob Two-Two and the Dinosaur (1987)
- Jacob Two-Two's First Spy Case (1995)

=== Travel ===
- Images of Spain (1977)
- This Year in Jerusalem (1994)

=== Essays ===
- Hunting Tigers Under Glass: Essays and Reports (1968)
- Shovelling Trouble (1972)
- Notes on an Endangered Species and Others (1974)
- The Great Comic Book Heroes and Other Essays (1978)
- Home Sweet Home: My Canadian Album (1984)
- Broadsides (1991)
- Belling the Cat (1998)
- Oh Canada! Oh Quebec! Requiem for a Divided Country (1992)
- Dispatches from the Sporting Life (2002)

=== Nonfiction ===
- On Snooker: The Game and the Characters Who Play It (2001)

=== Anthologies ===
- Canadian Writing Today (1970)
- The Best of Modern Humour (1986) (U.S. title: The Best of Modern Humor)
- Writers on World War II (1991)

== Film scripts ==
- Insomnia Is Good for You (1957) (co-written with Lewis Griefer)
- Dearth of a Salesman (1957, starring Peter Sellers (co-written with Lewis Griefer)
- No Love for Johnnie (1962) (co-written with Nicholas Phipps, based on the novel by Wilfred Fienburgh)
- The Wild and the Willing (1962)
- Life at the Top (1965) (screenplay from novel by John Braine)
- The Apprenticeship of Duddy Kravitz (1974) (Screenwriters Guild Award and Oscar screenplay nomination)
- The Street (1976) (Oscar nomination)
- Fun with Dick and Jane (1977, with David Giler & Jerry Belson, from a story by Gerald Gaiser)
- The Wordsmith (1979)
- Joshua Then and Now (1985)
- Barney's Version (2010, screenplay by Michael Konyves, based on Richler's novel of the same name; Richler wrote an early draft)

== See also ==
- List of Quebec authors
- Jews in Montreal
- World famous in New Zealand (Richler coined the similar phrase "world famous – in Canada" in The Incomparable Atuk, 30 years before the New Zealand version of the phrase made its first recorded appearance)
