= The Apprenticeship of Duddy Kravitz (novel) =

1959 novel by Mordecai Richler

- First edition
- Author: Mordecai Richler
- Cover artist: Bernard Blatch (design)
- Language: English
- Publisher: André Deutsch (UK); Little, Brown (US)
- Publication date: 1959
- Publication place: Canada
- Media type: Print
- Pages: 319 pages (first edition)
- ISBN: 978-0-671-02847-3

The Apprenticeship of Duddy Kravitz is a novel by the Canadian author Mordecai Richler. It was published in 1959 by André Deutsch, and adapted to the screen in 1974.

== Setting ==
The satirical novel is set mostly in poor districts of Montreal, such as St. Urbain Street, with mention of wealthier districts, such as Westmount and Outremont. Parts of the story take place in the Laurentian Mountains in the resort town of Sainte-Agathe-des-Monts and surrounding areas.

== Plot ==
The novel focuses on the young life of Duddy Kravitz, a poor Jewish boy raised in Montreal, Quebec. As a child, he is told by his grandfather that "a man without land is nobody," and he believes land ownership to be life's ultimate goal and the means by which a man becomes a somebody.

Duddy begins to move towards this goal by working for his Uncle Benjy. Their relationship is strained: Uncle Benjy, a wealthy clothing manufacturer with socialist sympathies, has always favored Duddy's brother Lennie, who wants to become a doctor. He takes a dim view of Duddy's commercial ambitions, seeing them as avaricious and crass. Duddy takes a job as a waiter at a hotel in Ste. Agathe. He stumbles upon a beautiful lake while out with his soon-to-be lover and "Girl Friday", Yvette. He sees that the lake has tremendous potential as a summer resort.

He returns to Montreal and starts a company to produce bar mitzvah films. To this end, he hires Friar, an alcoholic, avant-garde filmmaker blacklisted in the United States, for his communist tendencies. Since Duddy's childhood, his father, Max, had told him stories about Jerry Dingleman, the local "Boy Wonder" whose rags-to-riches story is canonical among the residents of St. Urbain Street. Looking for help with his film company, Duddy attempts to engage Dingleman. The two travel to New York City, but Duddy fails to secure assistance from the "Boy Wonder", who sees him as a naive upstart and uses him to ferry a package of heroin across the Canada-U.S. border.

On the way back from New York, he meets Virgil, an American with pinball machines for sale. Back in Montreal, Duddy rents an apartment and an office for himself and Yvette and begins buying the plots of land around the lake.

After Friar tries unsuccessfully to seduce Yvette, he abandons his work with Duddy. Duddy starts a new movie distribution business and hires Virgil as a travelling projectionist. A few months later, Virgil, an epileptic (a fact known to Duddy when he gave Virgil the job), experiences a seizure while driving, crashes, and is paralyzed from the waist down. Yvette, blaming Duddy, takes Virgil to Ste. Agathe, where she cares for him. Duddy is left to show the movies seven days a week while trying to oversee movie production.

Meanwhile, Uncle Benjy finds that he has a terminal illness. He tries to mend fences with Duddy, who rebuffs his request that the two see each other more frequently during his final days. Uncle Benjy's death acts as a trigger for Duddy, who has a nervous breakdown and refuses to leave his room for a week. He loses his clients and must declare bankruptcy and surrender all his possessions to the government (except for the land, which was in Yvette's name due to Duddy being considered a minor).

After Duddy recovers, he invites Yvette and Virgil to move with him into his uncle's mansion, which Duddy inherited on the condition that the house not be rented out or sold. When he hears that the last bit of land around the lake is for sale, he exhausts his remaining contacts trying to raise the money he needs but comes up short. Pressed for time and desperate, Duddy forges Virgil's signature on a cheque to get the money. Yvette tells Duddy's grandfather, who is embarrassed and unhappy with the way Duddy has obtained the land. This theft prompts Yvette and Virgil to move out of the mansion and forbid Duddy to see them again.

In the end, Duddy has no friends left. But in the Montreal St. Urbain Street joint where his taxi-driving father spends most of his time entertaining regulars with stories, someone recognizes Duddy as the guy who has acquired all of the land surrounding the lake in the Laurentians, and when Duddy, ordering servings for everyone while he has no cash to pay, gestures to his father, he is answered by the patron, "That's all right, sir. We'll mark it." He has made it. He's become a "somebody". He grabs his father and spins him around, repeating, "You see."

== Characters ==
The Kravitz family

- Simcha Kravitz – Duddy's grandfather. Throughout Duddy's childhood he is close to his grandfather, and it is Simcha who sparks Duddy's drive for land ownership when he tells young Duddy that "a man without land is nobody." Duddy purchases land with his grandfather in mind, intent on giving him a farm and the best retirement his money can buy.
- Benjamin and Ida Kravitz – Duddy's aunt and uncle. A childless couple with a strained relationship, Uncle Benjy takes quickly to Duddy's older brother, Lennie, providing him with funding for university. Uncle Benjy's attitude towards Duddy is markedly different, as he takes much less interest in the sly young boy's development. The family become estranged from Ida due to her winters in the southern states and her eventual divorce from Benjy, but she returns briefly upon finding out about Benjy's illness.
- Max and Minnie Kravitz – Duddy's mother and father. His father, a crude simple man, makes a living by driving a taxi. His mother died when Duddy was young, and his memories of her are few. Throughout the story he pesters Lennie for information about their mother, wanting to know if his mother liked him.
- Leonard (Lennie) Kravitz – Duddy's older brother by six years. Lennie attends medical school, funded by Uncle Benjy, and is set to fulfill the St. Urbain Street dream of being a lawyer or doctor. A studious boy, Lennie falls in with a crowd of well-off students during his university years who take advantage of him. When his studies plunge and are at risk as a result of his group of friends, Lennie flees to Toronto but is brought back by an insistent Duddy.
- David (Duddy, Duddel) Kravitz – As a youth, Duddy is something of a brat and a bully. He is a nuisance to his history teacher, Mr MacPherson, and leads a teenage gang called the Warriors. Unlike his brother, Duddy is a lacklustre student who passes through high school at the bottom of his class. He does, however, show entrepreneurial ambition early on, with his first money-making schemes in selling stamps and circulating Tijuana bibles. Duddy comes to have many loyal allies, but his own loyalties never extend beyond his own immediate family, including his grandfather, all of whom come to question his ambitions and means of making them happen.

Other characters

- Cuckoo Kaplan – A comedian at Rubin's Hotel. During Duddy's summer at the hotel, Cuckoo Kaplan is Duddy's only trusted acquaintance. The friendship between Duddy and Cuckoo ends when Duddy tells Cuckoo that he lacks talent.
- Yvette Durelle – An honest, hardworking young woman from Ste. Agathe whom Duddy meets while working at the hotel. Yvette takes Duddy on a walk deep into the mountains, where they stop at Lac St. Pierre. Duddy, excited about finding his dream land, entrusts Yvette with the deeds and secretarial work for his land acquisition and companies. Their relationship is strained by Duddy's constant swindling and tireless ambition. He is non-committal to his relationship with Yvette despite her genuine love for him and his being highly dependent on her.
- Virgil Roseboro – An American with epilepsy whom Duddy meets on a trip to New York. Duddy sells Virgil's smuggled pinball machines and then hires him to drive around and show films. Virgil is a loyal friend; despite Duddy's constant abuse, Virgil remains in his service. He is highly literate, composing poetry in his spare time and eventually creating an Epileptic Awareness publication, intent on giving epileptics the same network of support as other minorities. Duddy eventually cheats Virgil out of money after the latter is severely injured in an accident.
- Jacob Hersh – One of Duddy's classmates, Hersh is a young communist and desires peace and order. He won a scholarship to McGill University but dropped out to become a writer.
- Mr. John Alexander MacPherson - A teacher at Fletcher Fields High School, which Duddy attends. He, unlike the other teachers, refuses to use corporal punishment on the students. One night while MacPherson is out, a prank phone call by Duddy to MacPherson's house pulls his sickly bedridden wife Jenny out of bed, resulting in her death. When MacPherson returns to school, he uses corporal punishment on the boys. Already an alcoholic, in his spare time, he begins drinking even more heavily and suffers a nervous breakdown.
- Irwin Shubert – A 19-year-old boy whom Duddy first encounters while working in Ste. Agathe. Irwin is antagonistic to Duddy's ambition and cheats him out of his summer earnings via rigged roulette. He is later one of the boys comprising Lennie's group of McGill friends.
- Jerry Dingleman – Crippled from polio and walking with crutches, he is known as the "Boy Wonder". Ten years earlier, he was a very poor, typical Jew living in Montreal. As the legend goes, he collected street car transfers off the street and sold them. ("He’s up a quarter in 2 hours. Selling at 3 cents a piece.") Rather than donating the money to poor Jews, he bet on horses and won. Over a period of time, he became rich through many business ventures, including overseeing a drug-smuggling enterprise.
- Peter John Friar – A filmmaker blacklisted from Hollywood during the McCarthy raids. Duddy befriends him through a cinema club and together they start Duddy's company producing ludicrous avant-garde bar mitzvah films.
- Sandra Calder – One of the girls from Lennie's university friends' group. After she gets pregnant by her boyfriend, Lennie is pressured into performing an abortion on her, which could get him kicked out of medical school.
- Hugh Thomas Calder – Sandra's father. Although he attempts to befriend Duddy, he is turned away due to Duddy's unwillingness to set aside business. He is a millionaire who inherited, rather than earned, his money. Time called him “Bland, Brilliant Hugh Thomas Calder.”
- Mr. Samuel Cohen – Owns a scrap yard in Montreal. He befriends Duddy and gives him some fatherly advice about the need to use immoral means to get ahead in business. He is the first person to agree to buy a bar mitzvah film from Duddy.
- Mr. Rubin – The owner of "Hotel Lac Des Sables" in Ste. Agathe where Duddy works as a waiter.
- Linda Rubin – The spoiled daughter of Mr. Rubin. She somewhat unknowingly helps Irwin trick Duddy out of his summer earnings. Later she is seen as an escort for Dingleman.
- Jane Cox – A middle-aged woman who has an inappropriate interest in young school boys, Married to their favorite teacher Mr. Cox.
- Olive Brucker – Used to be a "perfect" couple with Jerry Dingleman, but left him when he got polio. Later she is hinted to be a drug addict.

== Major themes ==
- Antisemitism
- Persecution/Segregation
- Morality
- Alienation
- Materialism
- Victimisation
- Zionism
- Greed
- Corruption
- Ambition
- Coming of age

== Follow-up appearances by characters in the novel ==
Many of Richler's novels were interconnected, taking place in the same narrative world. Jacob Hersh, a minor character in this novel, is the central character in St. Urbain's Horseman (1971); other Duddy characters are referenced in some of Richler's later works.

Aging in more-or-less real time, Duddy Kravitz makes brief, comic appearances in both St. Urbain's Horseman and Barney's Version (1997). As he ages, Duddy never loses his drive to make money, and in his final appearance in Barney's Version, Duddy is in his 60s and is financially successful.

== See also ==
- Baron Byng High School
- Wilensky's
- The Apprenticeship of Duddy Kravitz (musical)
