= List of Canadian films of 1990 =

This is a list of Canadian films which were released in 1990:

Title	Director	Cast	Genre	Notes
Archangel	Guy Maddin	Kyle McCulloch, Kathy Marykuca, Ari Cohen	Drama	National Society of Film Critics – Best Experimental Film
Au chic resto pop	Tahani Rached		National Film Board documentary	
Basil Hears a Noise	Wayne Moss	Kevin Clash, Tim Gosley, Robert Mills, Pier Paquette	Short film, Children's film	
Beautiful Dreamers	John Kent Harrison	Colm Feore, Rip Torn, Wendel Meldrum, Sheila McCarthy	Historical drama	
Between Two Worlds	Barry Greenwald	Joseph Idlout	National Film Board documentary	Follow up to the 1952 documentary Land of the Long Day
Bethune: The Making of a Hero	Phillip Borsos	Donald Sutherland, Helen Mirren, Helen Shaver, Colm Feore, James Pax, Guo Da	Historical bio-drama about Dr. Norman Bethune	Genie Award – Costumes; first Canadian feature to be filmed in China; a Canada-France-China co-production based on a script by Ted Allan
A Bullet in the Head	Attila Bertalan	Kathy Horner	Drama	
The Burning Times	Donna Read		National Film Board documentary	Sequel to Goddess Remembered
Cargo	François Girard	Geneviève Rioux, Michel Dumont, Guy Thauvette	Drama	
The Company of Strangers	Cynthia Scott	Mary Meigs, Michelle Sweeney	Docufiction	U.S. release: Strangers in Good Company
Dark City	Chris Curling	Chris Curling	Murder mystery	Festival screenings only
Defy Gravity	Michael Gibson	R. H. Thomson, Chapelle Jaffe, Simon Reynolds, Tracey Moore	Drama	
Ding et Dong, le film	Alain Chartrand	Claude Meunier, Serge Thériault	Comedy	Golden Reel Award
Divided Loyalties	Mario Azzopardi	Jack Langedijk, Tantoo Cardinal	Historical drama	
Edsville	Alan Marr	Stuart Clow, Kathleen Laskey	Horror comedy	
Eminent Domain	John Irvin	Donald Sutherland, Anne Archer	Drama	Canada-France-Israel co-production
Falling Over Backwards	Mort Ransen	Saul Rubinek, Paul Soles	National Film Board drama	
The Famine Within	Katherine Gilday		Documentary	Genie Award – Feature Documentary
Five Feminist Minutes	Various		Short film compilation	
Flesh Gordon Meets the Cosmic Cheerleaders	Howard Ziehm	Vince Murdocco	Sci-fi exploitation	Direct to video
The Flying Sneaker	Bretislav Pojar	Ludek Navratil	Children's film	From the Tales for All series; Canada-Czechoslovakia. co-production
The Gate II: Trespassers	Tibor Takács	Louis Tripp, Pamela Segall, James Villemaire	Drama	
Getting Married in Buffalo Jump	Eric Till	Wendy Crewson, Paul Gross	Drama	
The Grifters	Stephen Frears	John Cusack, Anjelica Huston, Annette Bening	Neo-noir crime thriller	
H	Darrell Wasyk	Pascale Montpetit, Martin Neufeld	Drama	Genie Award for Best Actress, Pascale Montpetit
Hotel Chronicles	Léa Pool		Documentary	
An Imaginary Tale (Une histoire inventée)	André Forcier	Jean Lapointe, Louise Marleau, Charlotte Laurier, Marc Messier, Tony Nardi	Drama	
In Search of the Edge	Scott Barrie		Short documentary	
Internal Affairs	Mike Figgis	Richard Gere, Andy García, Nancy Travis, Laurie Metcalf, Richard Bradford, William Baldwin	Crime thriller	
The Little Kidnappers	Don Shebib	Bruce Greenwood, Leah Pinsent, Charlton Heston	Family Drama	Banff World Media Festival Rockie Awards
Mob Story	Gabriel Markiw and Jancarlo Markiw	John Vernon, Kate Vernon, Al Waxman	Crime drama	
The Moving Statue (La Liberté d'une statue)	Olivier Asselin		Experimental	
Moody Beach	Richard Roy	Michel Côté, Claire Nebout	Drama	
Mr. & Mrs. Bridge	James Ivory	Paul Newman, Joanne Woodward, Blythe Danner, Simon Callow, Kyra Sedgwick, Robert Sean Leonard	Drama	British-American-Canadian co-production
Musicians in Exile	Jacques Holender		Drama	
The Night of the Visitor (La nuit du visiteur)	Laurent Gagliardi	Macha Grenon, Luce Guilbeault, Maka Kotto	Short drama	
Nightbreed	Clive Barker	Craig Sheffer, Anne Bobby, David Cronenberg, Charles Haid	Dark fantasy horror	
No Apologies	Ken Pittman		Drama	
The Nutcracker Prince	Paul Schibli	voices Kiefer Sutherland, Megan Follows	Animated feature	
The Party (Le Party)	Pierre Falardeau	Lou Babin, Julien Poulin, Luc Proulx, Michel Forget, Gildor Roy	Prison drama	
Perfectly Normal	Yves Simoneau	Robbie Coltrane, Michael Riley, Kenneth Welsh	Comedy	
Princes in Exile	Giles Walker	Zachary Ansley, Stacie Mistysyn	Drama	
Prom Night III: The Last Kiss	Ron Oliver	Tim Conlon, Cyndy Preston, David Stratton	Slasher film	
Pump Up the Volume	Allan Moyle	Christian Slater, Scott Paulin, Ellen Greene, Samantha Mathis	Coming-of-age teen comedy-drama	
Snake Eater II: The Drug Buster	George Erschbamer	Lorenzo Lamas, Ron Palillo	Action	
Songololo: Voices of Change	Marianne Kaplan	Gcina Mhlophe, Mzwakhe Mbuli	Documentary	
The Star Turn	Nelu Ghiran	Nigel Bennett, Joe-Norman Shaw	Short drama	
Strand: Under the Dark Cloth	John Walker	with Georgia O'Keeffe, Cesare Zavattini, Paul Strand	Documentary	About the art and life of American photographer Paul Strand
Terminal City Ricochet	Zale Dalen	Peter Breck, Germain Houde, Jello Biafra	Drama	Direct to DVD
Too Close for Comfort	Peg Campbell	Stephen Fanning, Peter Stebbings	Short docudrama	
Understanding Bliss	William D. MacGillivray	Catherine Grant, Rick Mercer	Drama	
Vincent and Me	Michael Rubbo	Tchéky Karyo, Nina Petronzio, Christopher Forrest	Family film	From the Tales for All series; Canada-France co-production
White Room	Patricia Rozema	Kate Nelligan, Maurice Godin, Margot Kidder, Sheila McCarthy	Drama	

== See also ==
- 1990 in Canada
- 1990 in Canadian television
