= 12th Genie Awards =

1991 Canadian film awards ceremony

- Date: November 26, 1991
- Site: Pantages Theatre, Toronto, Ontario
- Hosted by: Leslie Nielsen

Highlights
- Best Picture: Black Robe
- Most awards: Black Robe (6)
- Most nominations: Black Robe (10)

Television coverage
- Network: CBC Television

The 12th Genie Awards were held on November 26, 1991, and honoured Canadian films released in 1990 and 1991. The ceremony was hosted by actor Leslie Nielsen.

Following the disastrous ratings of the 1990 awards, the academy reviewed all aspects of the awards. Audience studies were conducted, production formats and venues were scrutinized, and the adjudication process was revisited.

The audience studies confirmed what the academy suspected: that Canadians were not sufficiently familiar with Canadian films. With most films now released each fall, the public needed more time to see films, so the ceremony was moved to an autumn date. There was also a fundamental change in voting procedures; now, peer juries of academy members from each award category would nominate films, and voting members in each category would choose the winners. The number of eligible voters was reduced to 130, and the ceremony's format was changed to focus on the nominees for Best Motion Picture.

This year's awards covered a longer eligibility period and a larger number of eligible films than any previous Genie Awards, for which 39 features and 36 theatrical shorts and documentaries were in the final roster. The awards were dominated by the Canadian/Australian co-production Black Robe, which was nominated for ten awards and won six.

== Winners and nominees ==
Motion Picture	Direction
Black Robe — Robert Lantos, Sue Milliken, Stéphane Reichel; Chaindance — Richard Davis; The Company of Strangers — David Wilson; An Imaginary Tale (Une histoire inventée) — Claudio Luca and Robin Spry; Perfectly Normal — Michael Burns	Bruce Beresford, Black Robe; Phillip Borsos, Bethune: The Making of a Hero; Atom Egoyan, The Adjuster; André Forcier, An Imaginary Tale (Une histoire inventée); Darrell Wasyk, H
Actor in a leading role	Actress in a leading role
Rémy Girard, Love Crazy (Amoureux fou); Brad Dourif, Chaindance; Matthias Habich, The Savage Woman (La Demoiselle sauvage); Saeed Jaffrey, Masala; Jean Rochefort, Love Crazy (Amoureux fou)	Pascale Montpetit, H; Alice Diabo, The Company of Strangers; Cissy Meddings, The Company of Strangers; Kate Nelligan, White Room; Nina Petronzio, Vincent and Me (Vincent et moi)
Actor in a supporting role	Actress in a supporting role
August Schellenberg, Black Robe; Michael Hogan, Diplomatic Immunity; Julien Poulin, The Party (Le Party); Michael Riley, Diplomatic Immunity; Paul Soles, Falling Over Backwards	Danielle Proulx, Love Crazy (Amoureux fou); Sandrine Holt, Black Robe; Winifred Holden, The Company of Strangers; Ofelia Medina, Diplomatic Immunity; Catherine Roche, The Company of Strangers
Original Screenplay	Adapted Screenplay
Eugene Lipinski and Paul Quarrington, Perfectly Normal; Pierre Falardeau, The Party (Le Party); Jacques Marcotte and André Forcier, An Imaginary Tale (Une histoire inventée); Darrell Wasyk, H; Claire Wojas, Love Crazy (Amoureux fou)	Brian Moore, Black Robe; Léa Pool, Michel Langlois, and Laurent Gagliardi, The Savage Woman (La Demoiselle sauvage); Anne Wheeler and James DeFelice, Angel Square
Best Feature Length Documentary	Best Short Documentary
The Famine Within — Katherine Gilday; Au chic resto pop — Éric Michel; The Falls — Michael McMahon, Brian Dennis	The Colours of My Father: A Portrait of Sam Borenstein — Richard Elson, Sally Bochner; The Actor — John Paskievich; Hunters and Bombers — Rex Tasker, Alan Hayling; In Search of the Edge — Scott Barrie; Songololo: Voices of Change — Marianne Kaplan and Cari Green
Art Direction/Production Design	Cinematography
Gavin Mitchell and Herbert Pinter, Black Robe; Seamus Flannery, Beautiful Dreamers; Anne Pritchard, Perfectly Normal; Michel Proulx, Enrique Alarcón, Ren Huixing and Ronald Fauteux, Bethune: The Making of a Hero; Phil Schmidt, Chaindance	Peter James, Black Robe; Raoul Coutard and Mike Molloy, Bethune: The Making of a Hero; Guy Dufaux, Moody Beach; Guy Dufaux, Nelligan; Daniel Jobin, Cargo
Costume Design	Editing
Olga Dimitrov, Bethune: The Making of a Hero; John Hay and Renée April, Black Robe; François Laplante, Nelligan; Andrée Morin, The Party (Le Party); Ruth Secord, Beautiful Dreamers	David Wilson, The Company of Strangers; Michel Arcand, The Party (Le Party); André Corriveau, Vincent and Me (Vincent et moi); Allan Lee, Chaindance; Ronald Sanders, Perfectly Normal; Tim Wellburn, Black Robe
Overall Sound	Sound Editing
Garrell Clark and Paul A. Sharpe, Angel Square; Jo Caron, Yvon Benoît and Michel Descombes, Love Me (Love-moi); Michel Descombes, Luc Boudrias, Jo Caron and Richard Besse, Moody Beach; Jean-Pierre Joutel, John P. Megill and Adrian Croll, Beautiful Dreamers; Larry Sutton, Bill Sheppard and Paul A. Sharpe, The Legend of Kootenai Brown	Alison Grace, Gael MacLean, Anke Bakker, Debra Rurak and Cal Shumiatcher, Angel Square; Terry Burke, Jim Hopkins, Tony Currie, Charles Bowers and Ellen Adams, Beautiful Dreamers; Gudrun Christian, Andy Malcolm, Michelle Cooke, Abby Jack Neidik and Diane Le Floch, Falling Over Backwards; Jérôme Décarie, Marcel Pothier, Antoine Morin and Diane Boucher, Moody Beach; Gael MacLean, Alison Grace, Mike Keeping, Ingrid Rosen and Anke Bakker, The Legend of Kootenai Brown
Achievement in Music: Best Music Score	Achievement in Music: Best Original Song
Jean Corriveau, The Savage Woman (La Demoiselle sauvage); Marie Bernard, (Love Crazy (Amoureux fou); Georges Delerue, Black Robe; Jonathan Goldsmith, Diplomatic Immunity; Mark Korven, White Room	George Blondheim and Anne Wheeler, "Such Magic" — Angel Square; Rémy Girard and Claire Wojas, "C'est plus fort que nous" — Love Crazy (Amoureux fou); Daniel Lavoie and Jean Pierre Lefebvre, "Quand tu partiras" — The Fabulous Voyage of the Angel (Le Fabuleux voyage de l'ange); Patricia Rozema and Mark Korven, "A Certain Slant of Light" — White Room; Patricia Rozema and Mark Korven, "Hello I'm Nobody" — White Room
Best Short Film	Special awards
Saeed — Mehra Meh; Edsville — James O'Regan; Man Descending — Raymond Lorenz, Neil Grieve; The Night of the Visitor (La Nuit du visiteur) — René Gueissaz; The Star Turn — Donald Booth	Golden Reel Award: Ding et Dong, le film; Special Achievement Genie: John Kemeny; Outstanding Contributions to the Canadian Film Industry: Robert Lantos
