= Cap Tourmente (film) =

- Directed by: Michel Langlois
- Written by: Michel Langlois; Marcel Beaulieu
- Produced by: Bernadette Payeur
- Starring: Roy Dupuis; Élise Guilbault; Gilbert Sicotte; Andrée Lachapelle
- Cinematography: Éric Cayla
- Edited by: Jean-Claude Coulbois; Anne Whiteside
- Production company: ACPAV
- Release date: February 5, 1993
- Running time: 115 minutes
- Country: Canada
- Language: French

Cap Tourmente is a Canadian drama film, released in 1993.

The film centres on Jeanne O'Neil (Andrée Lachapelle), a single mother running a small inn in rural Quebec with her daughter Alfa (Élise Guilbault). The family's life is turned upside down, however, when bisexual prodigal son Alex (Roy Dupuis) and old family friend Jean-Louis McKenzie (Gilbert Sicotte) simultaneously arrive for a visit, causing chaos as Alex's sociopathic tendencies begin to blow the lid off the family's dysfunctional and borderline incestuous emotional life. Supporting cast members in the film include Macha Limonchik, Gabriel Gascon, Luc Picard, André Brassard, Caroline Dhavernas and Michèle Deslauriers.

The film garnered Genie Award nominations for all four of its lead actors at the 14th Genie Awards, with Dupuis and Sicotte nominated for Best Actor and Guilbault and Lachapelle nominated for Best Actress.

Guilbault won the 1992 Prix Guy-L'Écuyer for Cap Tourmente.

The film was originally inspired by a family-owned inn in Saint-Joseph-de-la-Rive where director and screenwriter Michel Langlois had worked in his youth. The film first entered development in 1984 as La Traversée, with Léa Pool originally slated to direct. However, she dropped out of the project, and Langlois brought it to French director Paul Vecchiali. Vecchiali was subsequently also unable to direct the film and Pool returned to the project a second time, but was again forced to drop out.

Langlois subsequently put the film on hold, opting to take other jobs in the film industry so that he could learn how to direct the film himself. He continued to write other screenplays, and directed several short films before completing a final draft of Cap Tourmente in 1991 and entering production in 1992 as the film's director. Both Dupuis and Guilbault had previously also acted in Langlois' short film Sortie 234.

In 2009, Langlois released Mère et monde, a documentary film about the real family who had inspired the film.

== Plot ==
Alex O'Neil has a deeply troubled mind. He also has a dysfunctional and incestuous family. He returns from his merchant seaman job to the rocky coasts of his home. His mother, Jeanne, doesn't seem to mind, and lets him stay at her bed and breakfast hotel. His sister, Alfa, seems to have the hots for him, just as she does for their old boyfriend Jean-Louis, who has just shown up. Jeanne seems to be attracted to him. All these people appear eager to get their hands on his body, but he's too wrapped up in what's going on inside his head to notice.
