= Steven Ho (martial artist) =

American martial artist and stuntman

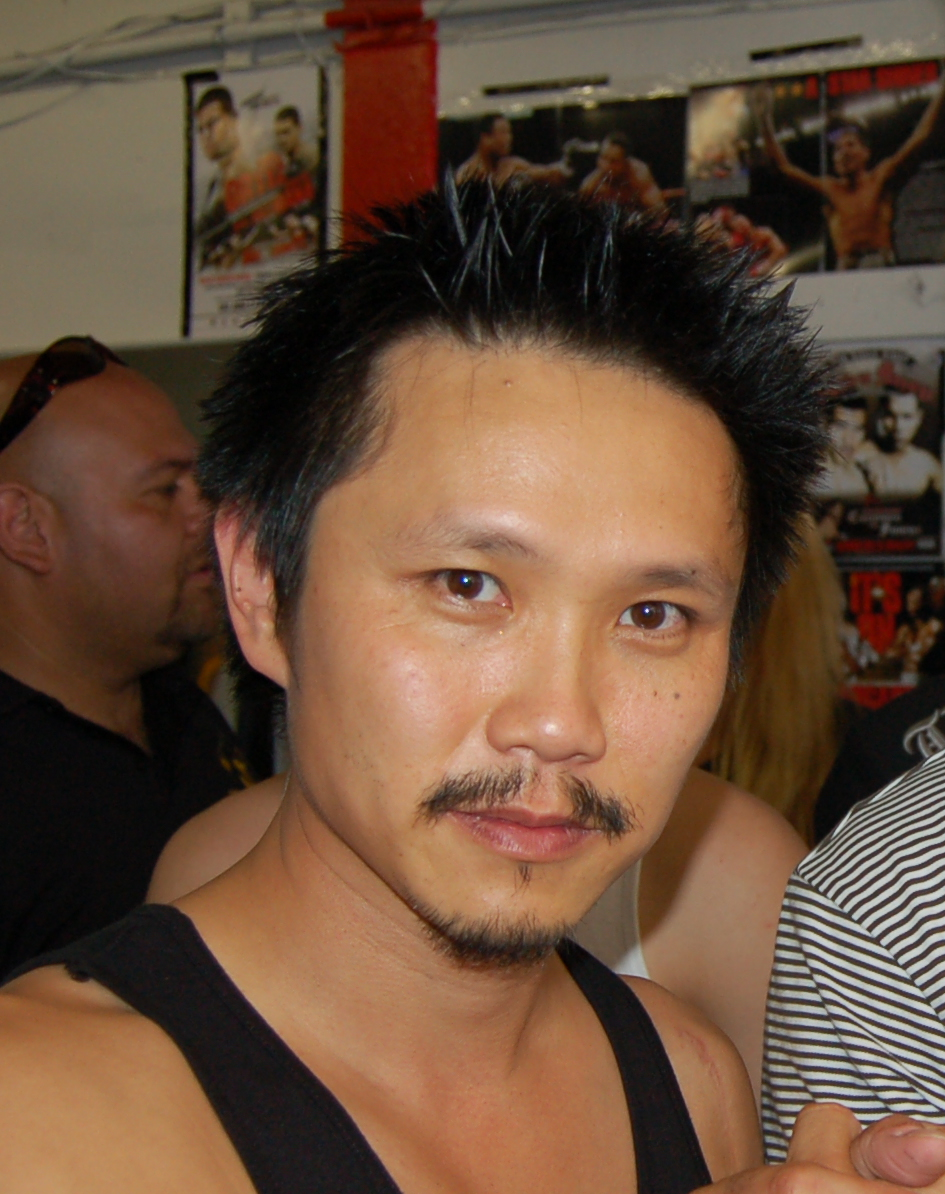
- Ho in 2009
- Born: Bernadetto Widiman Wibowo; 9 December 1973 (age 52); Bandung, Indonesia
- Occupations: Martial artist, actor, stunt coordinator, stuntman, writer, director, entrepreneur
- Years active: 1989–present (acting)
- Spouse: Nina Petronzio
- Children: 2

Steven Ho (born 9 December 1973) is an American martial artist, stunt coordinator, stuntman and member of the Academy of Television Arts & Sciences.

Known as one of the first martial arts tricksters in open martial art competitions and early pioneers of non-traditional forms (NASKA), Ho helped to popularize the 540 kick and the Hawkeye Kick in the mid-eighties. Many consider Ho's influence, particularly his 540 kick, to be the beginning of the tricking movement.

Ho is also well regarded for his stunt work as Donatello in Teenage Mutant Ninja Turtles II: The Secret of the Ooze (1991) and Teenage Mutant Ninja Turtles III (1993) and his role as "Chan" in Mortal Kombat (1995). For the much anticipated Britney Spears music video, "Hold It Against Me", Ho trained Spears and fight choreographed the Britney vs. Britney fight for director Jonas Åkerlund.

Ho was featured as himself on the ABC television reality series The Bachelor, where he directed a series of action scenes for Brad Womack and the contestants. The episode aired on 17 January 2011. He also featured himself on Bachelor Pad in season 3, as he taught and choreographed a fight scene for contestants Chris and Sarah. The episode aired on 13 August 2012.

Ho co-founded Plush Home, Inc., an all-encompassing interior design firm and furniture line, in 2003 with his wife, Nina Petronzio, a Canadian interior and furniture designer known for her high-end Transitional Style designs.

== Early life and martial arts ==
Born Bernadetto Widiman Wibowo in Bandung, Indonesia, to Chinese Indonesian parents (son of research scientist, Kie Liang Ho). Ho's family immigrated to United States in 1971, settling in South Gate, California as political refugees with the aid of Church World Service (CWS).

After eight years of intensive martial arts training with Richard King Sensei of the Karate Institute of America and winning local karate competitions in Los Angeles (particularly at Ed Parker's Long Beach International Karate Championships and various meets at the Culver City Civic Auditorium), Ho moved to the National Karate Circuit (North American Sport Karate Association) and was responsible for the American Forms Division of which he was National Champion. Known for his jump kicking techniques and innovative style, Ho quickly established himself as one of the top experts in the United States.

== Films ==
In 1989, Ho was recruited into the film business by action-icon Jet Li to work as his stunt double and "heavy" on a series of Hong Kong films. Jet Li, who was recuperating from injury, was at a National Karate tournament in Irvine, California when he picked Ho to be his stunt double in the finale fight scene of Long zai tian ya, aka Dragon Fight (1989), co-starring Stephen Chow. Ho also worked as a stunt fighter in the film Long xing tian xia, AKA, The Master (1989), which was Ho's second film as a stunt-actor with Li. The Master was directed by Hong Kong New Wave director, Tsui Hark.

Roger Corman gave Ho his Screen Actors Guild card for his supporting role in the sequel to Rock 'n' Roll High School, titled Rock & Roll High School Forever, starring Corey Feldman. Ho was the bass player in the new music band, "The Eradicators" fronted by Feldman (the original cult film featured The Ramones). In the film he delivered the famous line, "Hey, this no my pee!" Corman recorded an original soundtrack for "The Eradicators", but the film was not a success and the band never made it further than the film.

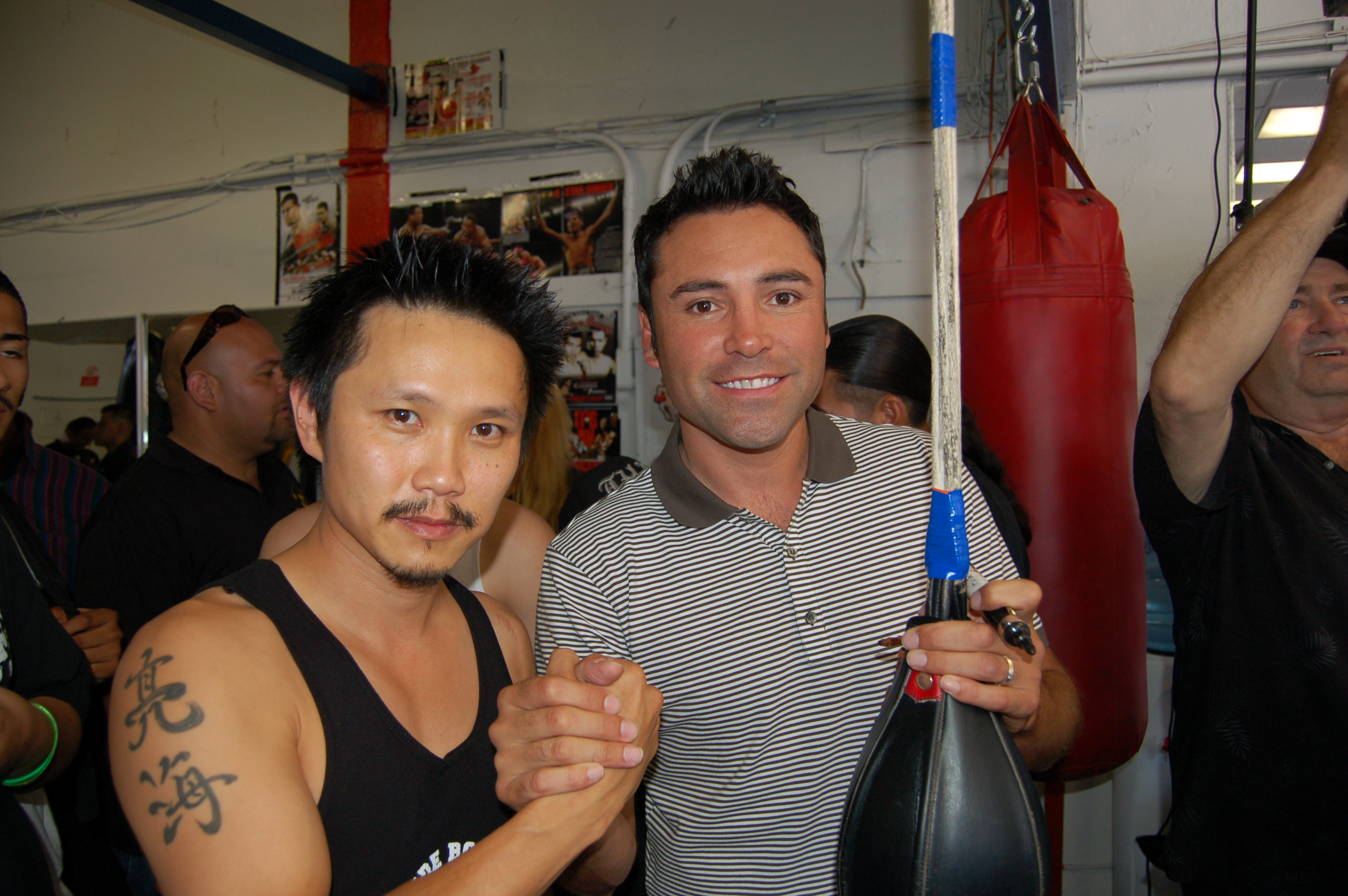
Steven Ho with Oscar De La Hoya at the Westside Boxing Club in Los Angeles in 2009

Ho then made plans to relocate to Hong Kong to pursue a career as a stuntman. But in 1990, Ho caught the eye of stunt coordinator, Pat Johnson, when he won his division at "The Battle of Atlanta National Karate Championships." Johnson convinced Ho to remain in Los Angeles when he cast him as the staff-wielding action turtle, Donatello, in the films Teenage Mutant Ninja Turtles II: The Secret of the Ooze (1991) and Teenage Mutant Ninja Turtles III (1993).

Ho went on to work in many film projects as an actor, action choreographer, fight trainer, stuntman, director, writer, and producer including his role as "Chan" in Mortal Kombat (1995). Through the mid-nineties, Ho guest-starred in many television series, highlighting his martial arts skills. Among them were Walker, Texas Ranger, Nash Bridges, Diagnosis Murder, High Tide. Ho also suffered many stunt-related injuries during this time, including a crushed foot that took five surgeries and two years of rehabilitation to overcome.

In 1999, Ho completed his directorial & writing debut on the indie film and festival favorite, Soundman. The film featured Wayne Pere, Eliane Chappuis, Nick Stahl and William Forsythe. For his directorial debut with "Soundman", former members of Guns N' Roses (Slash, Matt Sorum, Duff McKagan) reunited for the first time in six years to collaborate to score a portion of the film's soundtrack, as well as play at the film's opening party at Harry O's in Park City, Utah for the Slamdance Film Festival. The event was covered by MTV and Rolling Stone, and is believed to be the beginning of what eventually evolved into the Grammy Award-winning hard rock supergroup, Velvet Revolver.

In 2008, Ho Man was part of the acclaimed stunt team for Pirates of the Caribbean: At World's End that was nominated for a Screen Actors Guild award for Outstanding Performance by a Stunt Ensemble in a Motion Picture. Ho stunt coordinated and choreographed the Linkin Park music video (directed by Joseph Hahn), Shadow of the Day, which won a MTV Video Music Award for Best Rock Video that same year.

With his extensive background in martial arts and weapons, Ho has been a sought-after instructor and choreographer in Hollywood to stuntmen and actors aiming to get film-ready. Most Notably, Ho trained Brad Pitt in swordplay for six months prior to his production of Troy, and prepped Tobey Maguire for 3 months prior to his transformational role as Peter Parker in Spider-Man (2002). His students list includes Leonardo DiCaprio, James Franco, Pierce Brosnan, Pink, Method Man, Rachel Weisz, Gisele Bündchen, Josh Charles, Steve Nguyen, Peter Krause, Bar Refaeli, Lennie James, Ellen Barkin.

== Conan O'Brien ==
Ho was a regular and popular guest of The Tonight Show with Conan O'Brien. On the well-received segments, Ho would typically inflict apparent pain to Conan O'Brien while he aggressively taught the host the basics of stunt fighting.

On the 8th episode that originally aired on 10 June 2009, Ho opened the show by sucker-punching Conan to "give him a sense of what a real hit feels like". The duo continued with a choreographed fight scene in which Conan portrayed the "thug fighter" and Ho the "hero fighter". A theatrical property ("prop") fire extinguisher and shovel were incorporated into the fight choreography and the segment ended with Ho ratcheting Conan through a breakaway glass window. Comedian Dane Cook was also a guest that night.

Five weeks after his appearance, Ho was back for the 30th episode on 17 July 2009, making him the first returning guest of the show. This time Ho taught Conan the basics of sword fighting and using breakaway props. When he did not evade Ho's strike fast enough, Conan was hit by Ho with a bamboo sword in the ribs. Ho then proceeded to break a handful of breakaway bottles over Conan's head, sending him comically running to hide behind Andy Richter. The segment ended with Ho dragging Conan backwards in a sitting position across the stage and through a picket fence, chicken coop, breakaway mirror, and large scaled bowling pins. Seth Green was the second guest that night.

Ho made a third appearance on The Tonight Show with Conan O'Brien for the 65th episode on 14 September 2009, the first night the show shared the evening with Jay Leno's 10:00pm prime time show. Ho's segment ran for 13 minutes, 27 seconds. Charlize Theron was also a guest that night and Dave Mathews Band was the musical performance. In terms of audience, The Tonight Show with Conan O'Brien jumped 22% to 4.3 million viewers that night, compared to the shows typical Monday average that summer of 3.5 million viewers. There were also nice gains in adults 18–49 and adults 25–54. This episode also re-ran on 22 October 2009. Ho's third appearance on the show won an online poll for "Favorite Guest Moment" on The Tonight Show with Conan O'Brien's main website.

All of Ho's appearances were included in the montage of the finale show of The Tonight Show with Conan O'Brien on 22 January 2010.

After the announcement of the cancellation of The Tonight Show with Conan O'Brien, Ho was instrumental in supporting and rallying fans for the "I'M WITH COCO" movement spearheaded by artist Mike Mitchell through Facebook. At the 18 January 2010 rally held in Los Angeles in front of NBC studios, Ho portrayed "Asian Conan" in a popular sketch for the website Funny or Die in which "Asian Conan" fights "Asian Jay Leno" in a street fight. Funny or Die and Ho then produced the comedy-action short, "Asian Conan, Episode 1", released as an exclusive on their website in April 2010.

Ho returned as a guest on O'Brien's TBS show, Conan, on 25 January 2011. In the segment, Ho placed a watermelon on O'Brien's stomach, and then sliced it in half with a katana sword. Patton Oswalt was the second guest that night, with Wanda Jackson as the musical guest.

Ho's 8 June 2011 appearance on Conan made him the first main guest invited back for a second appearance on the TBS show. Ho taught O'Brien how to develop his Qi power through martial art breathing technique. He proceeded to teach Conan a proper martial art Horse stance and Sanchin, before kicking him with multiple Roundhouse kicks and hitting him with various wood dowels and a 2×4. The episode ended with Conan breaking three wood pieces held by Ho's assistants.

On 9 June 2011, O'Brien and George Lopez attempted a feat never before accomplished by two back-to-back late-night hosts. Both funnymen scheduled one another as guests on the other's program. In his interview on Lopez Tonight, O'Brien discussed his recent stunt segment with Ho and showed highlight clips. In particular, he talked about a 2x4 that did not break on his thigh when Ho hit him with it.

For Ho's 12 October 2011 appearance on Conan, the martial artist gave Conan a lesson in basic self-defense. He taught the late night host the fine art of palm strikes, elbows, knees, groin kicks, and head butts. Ho also taught Conan how to escape from a full mount position by "bucking" up while grabbing a handful of Conan's "love handle" at the same time.

1 March 2012 marked Ho's fourth appearance on Conan, and Ho's seventh time on television with the host (including The Tonight Show with Conan O'Brien). This segment focused on Ho teaching Conan how to utilize everyday home items as weapons for self-defense. Ho's lesson focused on hairspray, a plastic comb, coffee in a cup, a Sharpie pen, and a baby stroller.

Ho appeared on Conan for a fifth time on 13 September 2012, to teach the host self-defense against a gun, and how to defend himself against an attack inside a men's bathroom, while sitting on a toilet.

For a holiday sketch on 8 December 2012, Ho played himself at a Conan Christmas party where he and Andy Richter throw a drunk and belligerent Conan out a stage window.

"Occupy Conan" special ran on 31 January 2013. In addition to Conan and Andy Richter, the original show's guests, Anne Hathaway and Steven Ho were all recreated by fan submissions.

Ho and his stunt team accompanied Nina Dobrev on her 12 March 2013 guest appearance on Conan, by helping her showcase her fighting abilities to the host.

Ho returned as Conan's first guest on 25 July 2013 in a Teenage Mutant Ninja Turtle themed episode, where Ho taught the host the tricks of the trade on how to become an action hero.

== Stand-up comedy ==
Ho performed his first stand-up comedy sketch at Comedy Zen to a sold out 220 seat audience at The Downtown Independent in Downtown Los Angeles on 3 December 2010. He opened for veterans Jay Phillips and Joe Wong in a successful 30-minute set that included material on his experiences as a Hollywood stuntman and having Italian in-laws. A highlight of the show was when Ho brought out the original head from Teenage Mutant Ninja Turtles II: The Secret of the Ooze, and incorporated that into his set.

== Plush Home ==
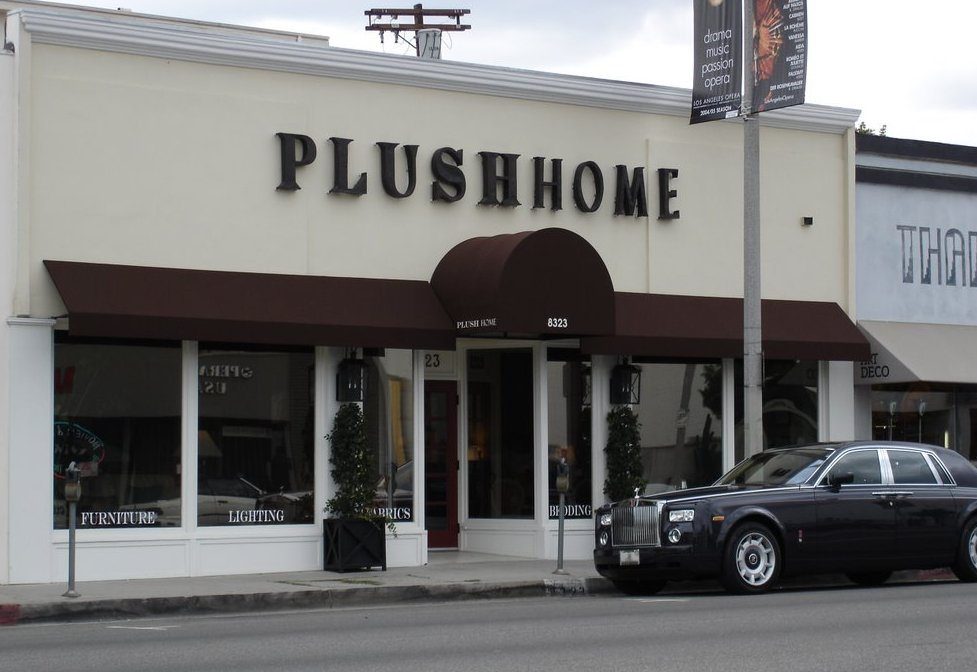
Plush Home's flagship showroom is located on Melrose Avenue in West Hollywood, California

Ho dropped out of Business School at Pepperdine University just a few classes shy of earning his bachelor's degree so that he could pursue his stunt career with Li. Shortly after meeting his wife, Nina Petronzio (an American interior designer and furniture designer), the couple established a boutique interior design firm in 2001.

In 2001–2003, Ho was hired as a creative consultant by Johnson & Johnson (NYSE: JNJ) to aid in their in-house presentations of new products developed.

In 2003, Ho and his wife, Nina Petronzio, secured a storefront on Melrose Avenue in West Hollywood, California and opened Plush Home, Inc, an influential, high-end interior, Transitional Style design firm and furniture line.
