= Flamenco at 5:15 =

1983 film

- Directed by: Cynthia Scott
- Produced by: Cynthia Scott; Kathleen Shannon; Adam Symansky
- Starring: Susana Robledo; Antonio Robledo
- Cinematography: Paul Cowan
- Edited by: Paul Demers; Cynthia Scott
- Distributed by: National Film Board of Canada
- Release date: 1983
- Running time: 29 minutes
- Country: Canada
- Language: English
- Budget: $142,457

Flamenco at 5:15 (French: Flamenco à 5 h 15) is a 1983 short documentary film directed by Cynthia Scott, taking audiences inside a flamenco dance class at the National Ballet School of Canada. Produced by Studio D, the women's unit of the National Film Board of Canada, the film won an Oscar at the 56th Academy Awards in 1984 for Documentary Short Subject.

== Cast ==
- Susana Robledo as Herself (as Susana)
- Antonio Robledo as Himself

== See also ==
- Flamenco (1995 film), a 1995 documentary
