= Eliane Chappuis =

Swiss actor and singer (born 1978)

Eliane Chappuis (born 1978) is a model, actress, singer, and producer. She was born in Hollywood, to Swiss-French-Vietnamese parents. When six months old, her parents decided to raise her in Bern, Switzerland, where she spent her childhood with her siblings. At thirteen years of age she already played violin and performed under the conduct of Sir Yehudi Menuhin in the orchestra of the conservatory during his visits to Switzerland. She began her acting career at the theatre stage in high school, and later attended the National Academy of Acting in Zurich.

In 1996, Chappuis returned to the United States at 18 years of age, where she was invited to attend Robert Redford's Sundance Institute Workshop and assisted on film projects including Tony Bui's "Saigon Stories" (aka Three Seasons 1999)."

Following the Sundance Institute workshop she traveled to Germany, to act the lead role in the television film "Streets of Berlin"(1998) Episode 1 "Die Mandarine von Mahrzahn", in the role of Vu Thi Hartmann. Since then, Eliane has appeared in a couple of independent films, such as "Soundman" (1998) by Steven Ho, "Facade"(1999) and "On the Roof" (2002), in which she played the lead role. She also had some further appearances in "Kilimanjaro: How To spell Love! (2001) a comedy by Swiss film director Mike Eschmann (Ready, Steady, Charlie!) and Martin Scorsese's Gangs of New York (2002), released by Miramax Films. She speaks English, French, Vietnamese, Swiss-German and German.

Chappuis is also a singer. Her first pop songs were released in June 2009 and in the following autumn her single "Christmas Time" was released by Fern Music. In May 2009 a short film by Natascha Beller, Chappuis appeared as young Chinese girl, who is married to an elder Swiss man.

In 2012–2013 she made her first documentary film "One week in Plum Village" at the Meditation & Retreat Centre of the Vietnamese Zen Buddhist Master Thích Nhất Hạnh. It was released on the Web at the Lucerne Film Festival in 2014.
