= René Malo =

Canadian film producer (1942–2026)

René Malo CQ
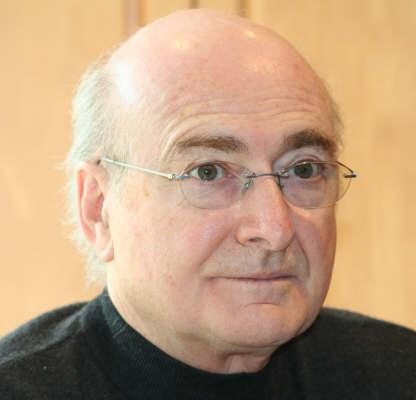
- Born: 7 March 1942; Joliette, Quebec, Canada
- Died: 23 August 2026 (aged 84)
- Occupation: Film producer

René Malo, CQ (7 March 1942 – 23 August 2026) was a Canadian film producer, most noted for establishing the Malofilm production and distribution studio.

== Life and career ==
Born in Joliette, Quebec on 7 March 1942, Malo produced youth-oriented shows at Expo 67. He later became a member of the first crew assigned to manage Radio-Québec.

As director Denys Arcand worked on the screenplay that became the 1986 film The Decline of the American Empire for producer Roger Frappier, Frappier saw the story as promising and lobbied Malo to co-produce, for a bigger budget. Frappier and Malo raised $1.8 million, allowing for more settings to be depicted in the film. Malo and Frappier eventually won the Genie Award for Best Motion Picture for the film. Among the other 25 films Malo produced were Sonatine (1984) and The Revolving Doors (1988).

Malo later led the René Malo Foundation, which in 2006 awarded a $500,000 grant to the Université du Québec à Montréal for the establishment of the Chaire René-Malo. The Chaire René-Malo, led by Professor Paul Tana, was created with a mandate to guide young filmmakers. In 2013, Malo was appointed a Knight of the National Order of Quebec (CQ).

Malo died on 23 August 2026, at the age of 84.
