= Brad Dourif =

American actor (born 1950)

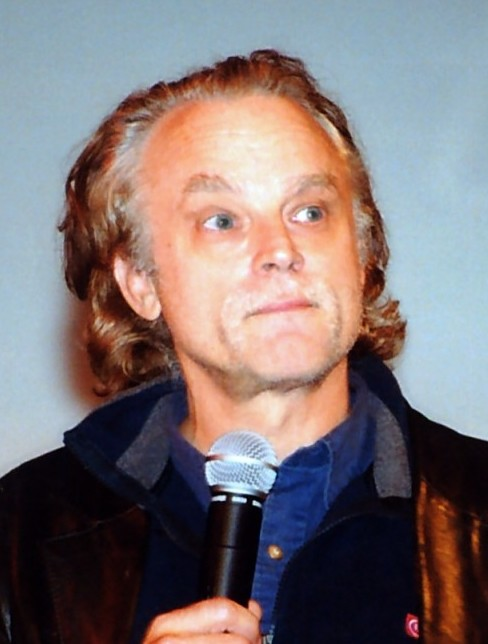
- Dourif in 2002
- Born: Bradford Claude Dourif; March 18, 1950 (age 76); Huntington, West Virginia, U.S.
- Occupation: Actor
- Years active: 1973–present
- Spouses: Janet Stephanie (m. 1974; div. 1980) Jonina Dourif (m. 1981; div. 1986)
- Children: Fiona Dourif
- Awards: See awards

Bradford Claude Dourif (/ˈdɔːrɪf/; born March 18, 1950) is an American actor. Described as the "ultimate character actor", Dourif is often cast in intense and villanious parts. For his debut film performance as Billy Bibbit in Miloš Forman's One Flew Over the Cuckoo's Nest (1975), he was nominated for an Academy Award for Best Supporting Actor. Through the late 70s and 1980s he continued to portray prominent supporting parts in films such as Eyes of Laura Mars (1978), Heaven's Gate (1980), Ragtime (1981), Mississippi Burning (1988), and notably played the lead role in John Huston's adapatation of Wise Blood (1979).

Starting with his role as Chucky in the Child's Play franchise (1988–present), he became heavily associated with genre titles, particularly horror films. His credits within genre cinema include The Exorcist III (1990), Graveyard Shift (1990), Spontaneous Combustion (1990), Body Parts (1991), Trauma (1993), Alien Resurrection (1997), Urban Legend (1998), Halloween (2007), its 2009 sequel, and his role as Gríma Wormtongue in The Lord of the Rings: The Two Towers (2002). Dourif is also noted for collaborating with art film directors David Lynch, on Dune (1984) and Blue Velvet (1986), and Werner Herzog on four films, including The Wild Blue Yonder (2005) and Bad Lieutenant: Port of Call New Orleans (2009).

He also appeared in many television series, with his most acclaimed television role being Amos "Doc" Cochran on the HBO western series Deadwood (2004–2006, 2019), for which he received Primetime Emmy Award and Satellite Award nominations.

== Early life ==
Dourif was born in Huntington, West Virginia to Joan Mavis Felton (née Bradford), an actress, and Jean Henri Dourif, an art collector who owned and operated a dye factory.

His paternal grandparents emigrated from France, and his paternal grandfather co-founded the Standard Ultramarine and Color Company in Huntington. After Dourif's father died in 1953, his mother married champion golfer William C. Campbell, who helped raise Dourif and his five siblings (four sisters and one brother). From 1963 to 1965, Dourif attended the private Aiken Preparatory School in Aiken, South Carolina. There, he pursued his interests in art and acting. Although he briefly considered becoming a flower arranger, he was eventually inspired to become an actor by his mother's participation as an actress in a community theater called Give Me Shelter.

After Aiken, he attended Fountain Valley School in Colorado Springs, Colorado, graduating in 1968. Dourif appeared as an amateur at the Fountain Valley Film Festival in 1969, taking second place in the 8 mm film category with his 10-minute entry "Blind Date." Dourif attended Marshall University for a time, before quitting college and moving to New York City to study acting on the advice of actress Conchata Ferrell.

== Career ==
=== Stage ===
Starting in school productions, Dourif progressed to community theater, joining up with the Huntington Community Players while attending Marshall University. In New York City, he studied with Sanford Meisner, and worked with Marshall Mason and Lanford Wilson at the Circle Repertory Company. During the early 1970s, Dourif appeared in a number of plays, off-Broadway and at Woodstock, New York, including The Ghost Sonata, The Doctor in Spite of Himself, and When You Comin' Back, Red Ryder?, in which he was spotted by director Miloš Forman who cast him in One Flew Over the Cuckoo's Nest (1975).

In 2013, after a three-decade absence from the stage, Dourif chose to star alongside Amanda Plummer in the Off-Broadway revival of Tennessee Williams' The Two-Character Play that played to critical acclaim at the New World Stages. He explained, in a filmed interview released by the producers, why he broke his 29-year hiatus from acting in live theater: "I hated the stage, did not want to do it. And then somebody said, 'Will you do a play? It's with Amanda Plummer', and I said, 'Oh shit! No. Oh God, I'm gonna have to do this...'". It opened on June 19, 2013, and closed on September 29, 2013. The play was subject to a number of performance cancellations, one relating to Dourif's absence due to a death in the family. Plummer refused to perform without Dourif, notwithstanding the presence of an understudy.

=== Film ===
Dourif had a small role in the film W.W. and the Dixie Dancekings (1975), but was omitted from the final cut of the film. His portrayal of the vulnerable Billy Bibbit in Cuckoo's Nest ended up being his big break, earning him a Golden Globe Award (Best Actor Debut) and a British Academy Award (Supporting Actor) as well as a nomination for Academy Award for Best Supporting Actor.

In 1981, Vincent Canby listed Dourif as one of twelve actors to watch, calling Dourif "one of the most intense, most interesting young film actors of his generation." Dourif returned to New York, where he continued in theater and taught acting and directing classes at Columbia University until 1988 (Don Mancini was among his students).

He continued with Eyes of Laura Mars (1978), John Huston's Wise Blood (1979), Forman's Ragtime (1981), Marc Didden's Istanbul (1985) and David Lynch's Dune (1984) and Blue Velvet (1986).

Dourif as Charles Lee Ray in Child's Play (1988)

Dourif has appeared in a number of horror films, most notably as the voice of Chucky in the Child's Play franchise. He portrayed the Gemini Killer in The Exorcist III (1990) and appeared in Death Machine (1994), Sworn to Justice with Cynthia Rothrock and Alien Resurrection (1997). He later appeared as Sheriff Lee Brackett in Rob Zombie's Halloween (2007) and Halloween II (2009). In 2013, Dourif reprised his role as Chucky in the sixth installment of the Child's Play franchise, Curse of Chucky, and then again in the 2017 sequel, Cult of Chucky. His daughter, Fiona Dourif, also starred with him in both films.

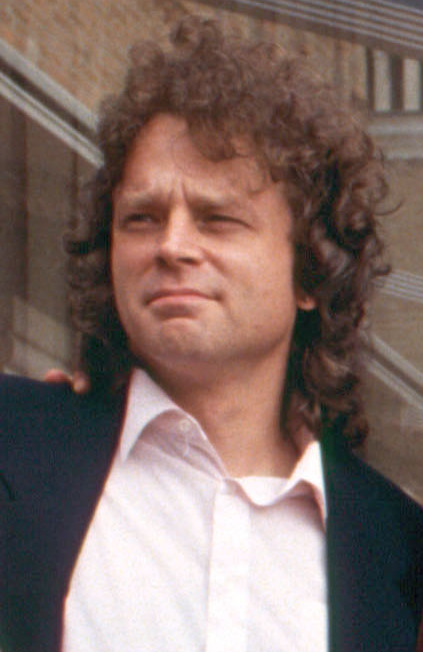
Dourif in 1991

Other notable film roles include Gríma Wormtongue in the Lord of the Rings trilogy and supporting roles in Fatal Beauty (1987), Mississippi Burning (1988), Hidden Agenda (1990), London Kills Me (1991) and Sinner (2007).

Dourif has worked with director Werner Herzog on many occasions, appearing in Scream of Stone (1991), The Wild Blue Yonder (2005), Bad Lieutenant: Port of Call New Orleans (2009), and My Son, My Son, What Have Ye Done? (2009).

On April 18, 2024, Dourif announced that he would be retiring from acting, with the exception of any Chucky-related projects involving the character, a decision he made because he considered Chucky creator Don Mancini to be "family". However, Dourif would reverse his semi-retirement in 2026 to portray a supporting role in Václav Marhoul's film Confession.

=== Television ===
In 1984, Dourif played a suspected serial killer in the episode "Number Eight" of Tales of the Unexpected. In 1994, he appeared in The X-Files episode "Beyond the Sea" as the psychic serial killer Luther Lee Boggs. He also portrayed sociopath Lon Suder in a three episode story arc on Star Trek: Voyager and guest starred as a troubled monk haunted by visions in Babylon 5. Dourif later won acclaim as Doc Cochran in Deadwood, receiving a 2004 Emmy Award nomination for Outstanding Supporting Actor in a Drama Series.

In 2011, he guest-starred in the third-season finale of Fringe and, in 2014, appeared in the Agents of S.H.I.E.L.D. episode "End of the Beginning".

In 2021, Dourif reprised his role as Chucky in the Child's Play television series titled Chucky.

Despite his semi-retirement outside of Chucky-related projects, he made another exception to have a cameo appearance on the first season of the HBO Max series The Pitt in 2025, as the father of a character portrayed by his daughter Fiona.

=== Music ===
In 2012, Dourif contributed spoken word vocals to three songs on the album Misery Together by the Norwegian duo Thinguma*jigSaw. Dourif also appears in the music videos for "Stranger in Town" (1984) by Toto and "Drinking from the Bottle" (2012) by Calvin Harris.

== Personal life ==
Dourif has been married twice; first to Janet Stephanie Charmatz, and then to Jonina Bernice Dourif, with whom he had a daughter, actress Fiona Dourif. He also has two stepdaughters.

== Filmography ==
=== Films ===
Brad Dourif's film appearances
Year	Title	Role	Notes/Ref.
1975	One Flew Over the Cuckoo's Nest	Billy Bibbit	
1977	Group Portrait with a Lady	Boris Koltowski	
1978	Eyes of Laura Mars	Tommy Ludlow	
1979	Wise Blood	Hazel Motes	
1980	Heaven's Gate	Mr. Eggleston	
1981	Ragtime	Younger Brother	
1984	Dune	Piter De Vries	
1985	Istanbul	Martin Klamski	
1986	Blue Velvet	Raymond	
1986	Impure Thoughts	Kevin Harrington	
1987	Fatal Beauty	Leo Nova	
1988	Child's Play	Charles Lee Ray / Chucky	
1988	Mississippi Burning	Deputy Clinton Pell	
1989	Sonny Boy	Weasel	
1990	Child's Play 2	Chucky (voice)	
1990	Grim Prairie Tales	Farley	
1990	Spontaneous Combustion	Sam	
1990	Horseplayer	Bud Cowan	
1990	Graveyard Shift	Tucker Cleveland	
1990	The Exorcist III	James "Gemini" Venamun	
1990	Hidden Agenda	Paul Sullivan	
1991	Murder Blues	John Barnes	
1991	Chaindance	Johnny Reynolds	
1991	Child's Play 3	Chucky (voice)	
1991	Jungle Fever	Leslie	
1991	Body Parts	Remo Lacey	
1991	Scream of Stone	Fingerless	
1991	London Kills Me	Hemingway	
1992	Final Judgement	Father Tyrone	
1992	Critters 4	Al Bert	
1993	Trauma	Dr. Lloyd	
1993	Amos & Andrew	Officer Donnie Donaldson	
1994	Color of Night	Clark	
1994	Death Machine	Dante	
1995	Murder in the First	Byron Stamphill	
1995	Phoenix	Reiger	
1996	Sworn to Justice	Teddy	
1996	A Step Toward Tomorrow	Kirby	
1997	Jamaica Beat	Tom Peterson	
1997	Nightwatch	Duty Doctor	
1997	Best Men	John "Gonzo" Coleman	
1997	Alien Resurrection	Dr. Jonathan Gediman	
1998	Brown's Requiem	Edwards	
1998	Senseless	Dr. Wheedon	
1998	Progeny	Dr. Bert Clavell	
1998	Urban Legend	Michael McDonnell	Uncredited
1998	Bride of Chucky	Chucky (voice)	
1999	The Diary of the Hurdy-Gurdy Man	Gabriel	
1999	Cypress Edge	Colin McCammon	
1999	Interceptors	David M. Webber	
1999	Silicon Towers	Alton	
2000	Shadow Hours	Roland Montague	
2000	The Prophecy 3: The Ascent	Zealot	
2001	The Ghost	Lt. Garland	
2001	Soulkeeper	Mr. Pascal	
2002	The Lord of the Rings: The Two Towers	Gríma Wormtongue	
2003	The Box	Stan	
2003	Vlad	Radescu	
2003	The Lord of the Rings: The Return of the King	Gríma Wormtongue	Extended cut only
2004	Seed of Chucky	Chucky (voice)	
2004	The Devil's Due at Midnight	The Dark One	
2004	The Hazing	Professor Kapps	
2004	El Padrino	Cyrus	
2005	Drop Dead Sexy	Herman	
2005	The Wild Blue Yonder	The Alien	
2005	Man of Faith	B. B. Gallen	
2006	Pulse	Thin Bookish Guy	
2007	Sinner	Caddie	
2007	The List	Johan Gabini	
2007	The Wizard of Gore	Dr. Chong	
2007	Halloween	Sheriff Leigh Brackett	
2008	Touching Home	Clyde Winston	
2008	Humboldt County	Jack	
2009	Born of Earth	Mayor	
2009	Lock and Roll Forever	Zee	
2009	Bad Lieutenant: Port of Call New Orleans	Ned Schoenholtz	
2009	Halloween II	Sheriff Leigh Brackett	
2009	My Son, My Son, What Have Ye Done?	Uncle Ted	
2010	Chain Letter	Mr. Smirker	
2010	Junkyard Dog	Sheriff Holk	
2011	Fading of the Cries	Mathias	
2011	Priest	Salesman	
2011	Catch .44	Sheriff Connors	
2011	Death and Cremation	Stan	
2012	Last Kind Words	Wylon	
2012	Black Box	Tom	
2013	Santa Monica	Stan	Short film
2013	Gingerclown	Worm Creature (voice)	
2013	Blood Shot	Bob	
2013	Curse of Chucky	Charles Lee Ray / Chucky	
2013	Malignant	The Man	
2014	The Control Group	Dr. Broward	
2015	Rosemont	Abe	
2017	Cult of Chucky	Chucky (voice)	
2017	Out to Lunch	Man	Short film
2017	Cut Off	Diggs	
2018	Wildling	Daddy / Gabriel Hanson	
2019	Obsession	George	
2021	The Shuroo Process	Dr. Feinstein	
2022	The Living	Vlad	Short film
2026	Confession	Father Mikulski	

=== TV ===
Brad Dourif's television appearances
Year	Title	Role	Notes/Ref.
1976	The Mound Builders	Chad Jasker	Television film
1977	The Gardener's Son	Robert McEvoy	Television film
1978	Sergeant Matlovich vs. the U.S. Air Force	Sgt. Leonard Matlovich	Television film
1979	Studs Lonigan	Danny O'Neill	3 episodes
1980	Guyana Tragedy: The Story of Jim Jones	David Langtree	Television film
1982	I, Desire	Paul	Television film
1984	Tales of the Unexpected	Hitchhiker	Episode: "Number Eight"
1986	The Equalizer	Fenn	Episode: "Out of the Past"
1986	Spenser: For Hire	Maxie Lyons	Episode: "Rage"
1986	Rage of Angels	Seymour Bourne	Television film
1986	Vengeance: The Story of Tony Cimo	Lamar Sands	Television film
1987	Moonlighting	Father McDonovan	Episode: "All Creatures Great...and Not So Great"
1987	The Hitchhiker	Billy Baltimore Jr.	Episode: "The Legendary Billy B."
1987	Miami Vice	Joey Wyatt	Episode: "Theresa"
1989	Murder, She Wrote	Dr. Warren Overman	Episode: "Fire Burn, Cauldron Bubble"
1989	Desperado: The Outlaw Wars	Camillus Fly	Television film
1989	Terror on Highway 91	Keith Evans	Television film
1993	Wild Palms	Chickie Levitt	3 episodes
1993	Tales from the Crypt	Virgil	Episode: "People Who Live in Brass Hearses"
1994	The X-Files	Luther Lee Boggs	Episode: "Beyond the Sea"
1994	A Worn Path	Hunter	Television film
1995	Babylon 5	Charles Dexter / Brother Edward	Episode: "Passing Through Gethsemane"
1995	Escape from Terror: The Teresa Stamper Story	Sheriff Bill Douglass	Television film
1995	Escape to Witch Mountain	Luther / Bruno	Television film
1996	Star Trek: Voyager	Lon Suder	3 episodes
1996	Blackout	Thomas Payne	Television film
1996	If Looks Could Kill	M. Eugene "Gene" Hanson	Television film
1997	Millennium	Dennis Hoffman	Episode: "Force Majeure"
1999	The Norm Show	The Devil	Episode: "Norm and Shelley"
1999	The Magnificent Seven	Rupert Brauner	Episode: "Chinatown"
1999	The Hunger	Manno	Episode: "Sin Seer"
2001–02	Ponderosa	Maurice Deveraux	8 episodes
2004–06	Deadwood	Dr. Amos "Doc" Cochran	Main cast
2008	Law & Order	Dr. David Lingard	Episode: "Called Home"
2010	Law & Order: Special Victims Unit	Dr. Iggy Drexel	Episode: "Torch"
2011	Fringe	Moreau	Episode: "The Day We Died"
2011	Psych	Bernie Bethel	Episode: "Shawn, Interrupted"
2011	Miami Magma	Jacob Capilla	Television film
2012	Wilfred	P.T.	Episode: "Questions"
2012	Criminal Minds	Adam Rain	Episode: "The Lesson"
2012	Swamp Volcano	Jacob Capilla	Television film
2012–14	Once Upon a Time	Zoso	2 episodes
2013	End of the World	Dr. Walter Brown	Television film
2014	Agents of S.H.I.E.L.D.	Thomas Nash	Episode: "End of the Beginning"
2016	The Wilding	David Stearns	Television film
2019	Deadwood: The Movie	Dr. Amos "Doc" Cochran	Television film
2021–2024	Chucky	Charles Lee Ray / Chucky	Main cast
2025	The Pitt	Neil McKay	Episode: "8:00 P.M."

=== Theatre ===
Brad Dourif's stage appearances
Year	Title	Role	Venue	Ref.
1973	When You Comin' Back, Red Ryder?	Stephen "Red" Ryder	Sheridan Square Playhouse, Off-Broadway	
1973–1974	When You Comin' Back, Red Ryder?	Stephen "Red" Ryder	Eastside Playhouse, Off-Broadway	
2013	The Two-Character Play	Felice	New World Stages, Off-Broadway	

=== Video games ===
Brad Dourif's video game appearances
Year	Title	Role	Notes/Ref.
2001	Myst III: Exile	Saavedro	
2002	Run Like Hell	Fred	Voice
2005	Gun	Reverend Josiah Reed	Voice
2012	Dishonored	Piero Joplin	Voice
2023	Dead by Daylight	The Good Guy	DLC, Voice

== Awards and honors ==
Brad Dourif's accolades
Institution	Year	Category	Nominated work	Result	Ref.
Academy Awards	1976	Best Supporting Actor	One Flew Over the Cuckoo's Nest	Nominated	
BAFTA Awards	1977	Best Actor in a Supporting Role	One Flew Over the Cuckoo's Nest	Won	
Beverly Hills Film Festival	2013	Best Actor	Santa Monica	Won	
Chicago Film Critics Association	1989	Best Supporting Actor	Mississippi Burning	Nominated	
Fangoria Chainsaw Awards	1991	Best Supporting Actor	Body Parts	Won	
Fangoria Chainsaw Awards	1999	Hall of Fame	—N/a	Won	
Genie Awards	1991	Best Supporting Actor	Chaindance	Nominated	
Golden Globe Awards	1976	New Star of the Year – Actor	One Flew Over the Cuckoo's Nest	Won	
Primetime Emmy Awards	2004	Outstanding Supporting Actor in a Drama Series	Deadwood	Nominated	
San Sebastián International Film Festival	1979	Best Actor	Wise Blood	Nominated	
Satellite Awards	2005	Best Supporting Actor – Television Series	Deadwood	Nominated	
Saturn Awards	1991	Best Supporting Actor	The Exorcist III	Nominated	
Screen Actors Guild Awards	2003	Outstanding Performance by a Cast in a Motion Picture	The Lord of the Rings: The Two Towers	Nominated	
Screen Actors Guild Awards	2007	Outstanding Performance by an Ensemble in a Drama Series	Deadwood	Nominated	
