= Chaindance =

- Directed by: Allan A. Goldstein
- Written by: Michael Ironside; Alan Aylward
- Produced by: Richard Davis; Michael Ironside (executive producer); Rose Lam Waddell (associate producer)
- Starring: Michael Ironside; Brad Dourif; Don S. Davis; Bruce Glover; Rae Dawn Chong
- Cinematography: Tobias A. Schliessler
- Edited by: Allan Lee
- Music by: Graeme Coleman
- Distributed by: Academy (video); Ascot Video; New City Releasing
- Release date: 1991
- Running time: 109 minutes
- Country: Canada
- Language: English

Chaindance is a 1991 Canadian drama film. The film stars Michael Ironside, Brad Dourif, Rae Dawn Chong, and Don S. Davis as "Sergeant".

== Background ==
The film is based on Alan Aylward's work with physically disabled children as a recreational therapist at a residential chronic care centre in Toronto from 1974 to 1980. The original script suggested Nick Nolte as Blake and John Hurt as Johnnie, but both passed on the roles which went to Michael Ironside and Brad Dourif, respectively. Hurt, who had previously worked with Aylward during a documentary series The Disability Myth, was initially interested in the role of Johnnie; Nolte's agent reportedly required a few million dollars for a retainer which Aylward was unable to raise. Ironside was on set with Nick Nolte and Powers Boothe in New Mexico making a film called Extreme Prejudice when he was presented a draft of the script for Chaindance by his Toronto agent, Lori Rotenberg. Ironside had just finished reading the script when Nolte emerged from his trailer to announce that he had just secured the rights to produce Weeds, based on the book by the same name, and also "a prison story". Inspired by what he interpreted as serendipity, Ironside optioned the script from Aylward in 1987/88, began production in Vancouver, and released the film in 1991. A few years later, the British Columbia Corrections Ministry started a program between prisoners and institutionalized handicapped patients based on the fictitious rehabilitation program in Chaindance.

== Cast ==
- R. Nelson Brown as Greason
- Leslie Carlson as Willy
- Rae Dawn Chong as Ilene Curtis
- Bill Croft as Mitch
- Don S. Davis as Sergeant
- Brad Dourif as Johnny
- Bruce Glover as Casey
- Deryl Hayes as Policeman outside bar
- Michael Ironside as J.T. Blake
- Tamsin Kelsey as Ginger
- Peter LaCroix as Guard
- Steve Makaj as Officer in Hotel
- Stephen E. Miller as Porter
- Sheila Moore as Nurse Butcher
- Janne Mortil as Loni
- Ken Pogue as Warden Slade

== Recognition ==
- 1991
  - Genie Award for Best Achievement in Art Direction/Production Design - Phil Schmidt - Nominated
  - Genie Award for Best Achievement in Editing - Allan Lee - Nominated
  - Genie Award for Best Motion Picture - Richard Davis - Nominated
  - Genie Award for Best Performance by an Actor in a Leading Role - Brad Dourif - Nominated
