= Plush Home =

Plush Home, Inc.
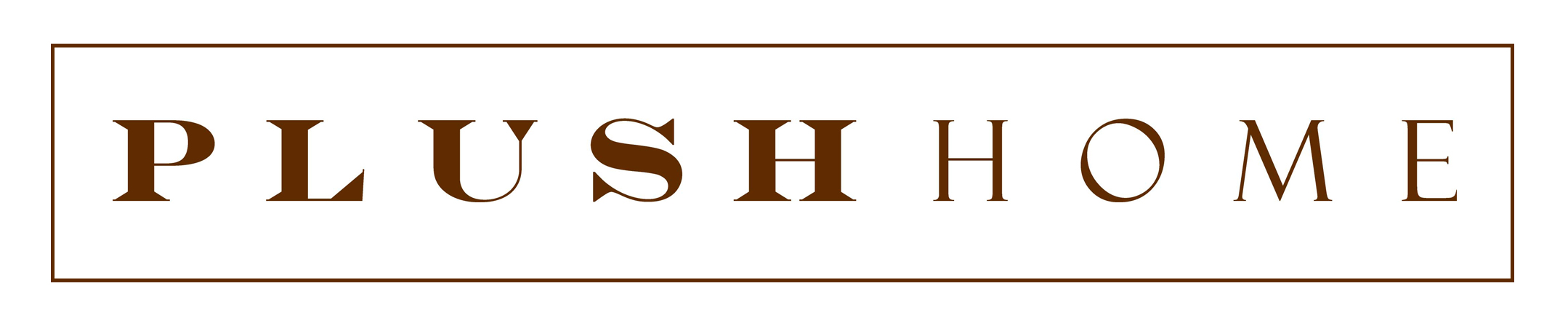

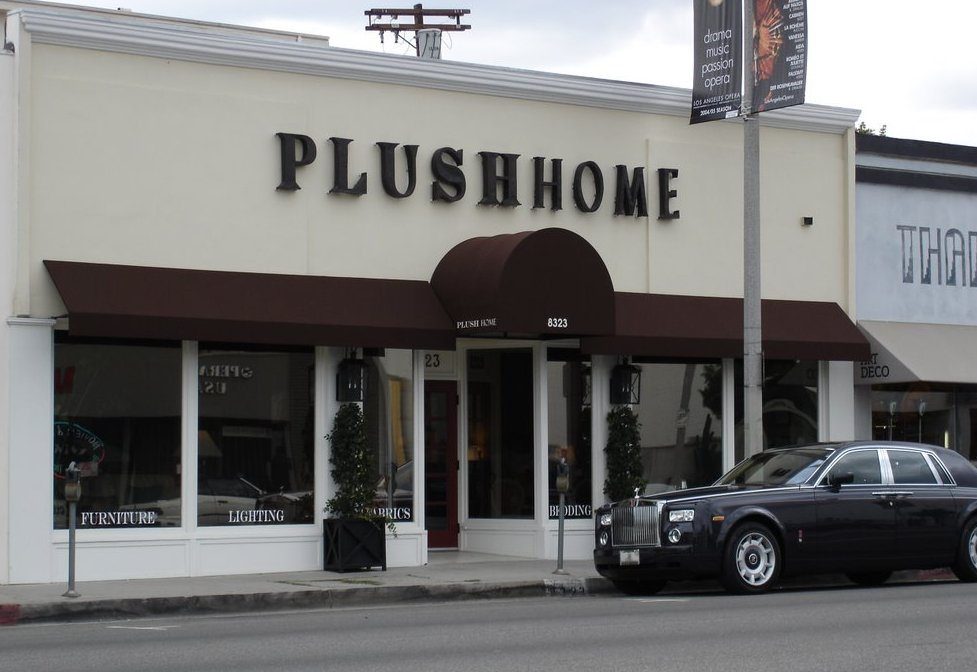
- Plush Home's flagship showroom is located in the heart of the fashion district on Melrose Avenue in West Hollywood, California
- Company type: Privately held company
- Industry: Custom Home Furnishings and Interior Design
- Founded: 2003
- Headquarters: West Hollywood, California
- Key people: Nina Petronzio; Steven Ho
- Products: Home Furnishings
- Website: www.plushhome.com

Plush Home, Inc., is an American company that sells home furnishings and functions as an interior-design firm. It was founded in 2003 by interior designer and furniture designer Nina Petronzio and her husband, martial art expert Steven Ho.

According to Petronzio, the idea for the company came in 2002 when she encountered difficulty finding high-end, luxury furniture with customizable options and short lead times for her clients. She built a flagship showroom on Melrose Avenue in West Hollywood, California, in 2003 to resemble the interior of a high-end home.

== Usage in popular culture ==
- In 2007, the Plush Home Tulip Dining Table and Park Avenue Console was used on the set of Spider-Man 3, in the restaurant scene where Peter Parker plans to propose to Mary Jane Watson.
