= The Savage Woman (1991 film) =

- La Demoiselle sauvage
- Directed by: Léa Pool
- Written by: Léa Pool; Michel Langlois; Laurent Gagliardi
- Based on: La Demoiselle sauvage by S. Corinna Bille
- Produced by: Denise Robert
- Starring: Patricia Tulasne; Matthias Habich
- Cinematography: Georges Dufaux
- Edited by: Alain Belhumeur
- Music by: Jean Corriveau
- Release date: August 1991
- Running time: 106 minutes
- Countries: Canada; Switzerland
- Language: French
- Budget: C$3 million

The Savage Woman (French: La Demoiselle sauvage) is a 1991 Canadian-Swiss drama film written and directed by Léa Pool and starring Patricia Tulasne and Matthias Habich. Based on a short story by Swiss writer S. Corinna Bille, the film follows a woman who takes refuge in the Swiss mountains and is found by a dam engineer. It premiered at the Montreal World Film Festival, where it won Best Canadian Film and Best Artistic Contribution. Jean Corriveau won Best Original Score for the film at the 12th Genie Awards.

== Synopsis ==
Marianne, a young woman fleeing a violent incident, escapes from the city into the mountains and collapses near a hydroelectric dam. Élysée, an engineer working at the dam, finds her and nurses her back to health. As he hides her from the police, her past is gradually revealed.

== Cast ==
The cast includes:

- Patricia Tulasne as Marianne
- Matthias Habich as Élysée
- Michel Voïta as the police chief
- Roger Jendly as Maurice
- Lenie Scoffié as Marie Chappaz
- Séverine Bujard as Élysée's wife
- Jonas Pool as Élysée's elder son
- Sylvain Pool as Élysée's younger son
- Bernard Lamy as the gendarme

== Production ==
The film was a Quebec-Swiss co-production between Cinémaginaire, Limbo Films and the National Film Board of Canada. It was directed by Léa Pool and written by Pool, Laurent Gagliardi and Michel Langlois, based on the short story La Demoiselle sauvage by S. Corinna Bille. The film was shot in the Canton of Valais, Switzerland, including Grimentz in the Val d'Anniviers region. It had a budget of C$3 million.

== Reception ==
=== Awards and nominations ===
The film premiered in August 1991 at the Montreal World Film Festival, where it won the awards for Best Canadian Film and Best Artistic Contribution. At the 12th Genie Awards, it received three nominations: Best Actor for Matthias Habich, Best Adapted Screenplay for Léa Pool, Michel Langlois and Laurent Gagliardi, and Best Original Score, which Jean Corriveau won.

=== Critical response ===
Filmdienst described the film as a poetic and visually beautiful drama about a passionate but impossible love.

Matthias Rüttimann of Zoom praised Patricia Tulasne's performance, highlighting the mix of fragility and uncompromising strength she brought to the title character. He also wrote that Pool told the story on several levels, through plot, imagery and music.
