= The Decline of the American Empire =

1986 film by Denys Arcand

- French-language film poster
- French: Le Déclin de l'empire américain
- Directed by: Denys Arcand
- Written by: Denys Arcand
- Produced by: Roger Frappier; René Malo
- Starring: Dominique Michel; Dorothée Berryman; Rémy Girard; Pierre Curzi; Louise Portal; Yves Jacques; Geneviève Rioux; Daniel Brière; Gabriel Arcand
- Cinematography: Guy Dufaux
- Edited by: Monique Fortier
- Music by: François Dompierre
- Distributed by: Malofilms
- Release date: June 19, 1986 (Quebec)
- Running time: 101 minutes
- Country: Canada
- Language: French
- Budget: $1.8 million
- Box office: $30 million

The Decline of the American Empire (French: Le Déclin de l'empire Américain) is a 1986 Canadian sex comedy-drama film directed by Denys Arcand and starring Rémy Girard, Pierre Curzi and Dorothée Berryman. The film follows a group of intellectual friends from the University of Montreal history department as they engage in a long dialogue about their sexual affairs, touching on issues of adultery, homosexuality, group sex, BDSM and prostitution. A number of characters associate self-indulgence with societal decline.

The film was a box office success in Canada and internationally and received good reviews. It won the FIPRESCI Prize at the Cannes Film Festival, nine Genie Awards, including Best Motion Picture, and was the first Canadian film nominated for the Academy Award for Best Foreign Language Film. The film won the People's Choice Award at the 11th Toronto International Film Festival. It was followed by two sequels, The Barbarian Invasions in 2003 and Days of Darkness in 2007.

== Plot ==
In an interview with Radio-Canada, Université de Montréal History Professor Dominique St. Arnaud tells Diane about her new book, Variations on the Idea of Happiness, which discusses her thesis that modern society's fixation on self-indulgence is indicative of its decline, predicting a collapse in the "American Empire", of which Quebec is on the periphery. Several of Dominique and Diane's friends, mostly intellectual history professors at the university, prepare for a dinner later in the day, with the men at work in the kitchen while the women work out at the gym.

As the dinner draws nearer, the men and women mainly talk about their sex lives, with the men being open about their adulteries, including Rémy, who is married to Louise. Most of the women in the circle of friends have had sex with Rémy, though he is not attractive, but they conceal this from Louise to spare her feelings. Louise has been to an orgy with Rémy, but believes he is generally faithful to her in Montreal. The friends are also accepting of their homosexual friend Claude, who speaks about pursuing men reckless of fear of STDs, while secretly being fearful of having one. During the dinner party, the friends listen to Dominique's theories about the decline of society, with Louise expressing skepticism. To retaliate against Louise, Dominique reveals she has had sex with Rémy and their friend Pierre, causing her to have an emotional meltdown. By morning, relationships have gone back to normal.

== Cast ==
- Rémy Girard as Rémy
- Dominique Michel as Dominique
- Dorothée Berryman as Louise
- Louise Portal as Diane
- Pierre Curzi as Pierre
- Yves Jacques as Claude
- Geneviève Rioux as Danielle
- Daniel Brière as Alain
- Gabriel Arcand as Mario
- Ariane Frédérique as Nathalie.

== Production ==
=== Development ===
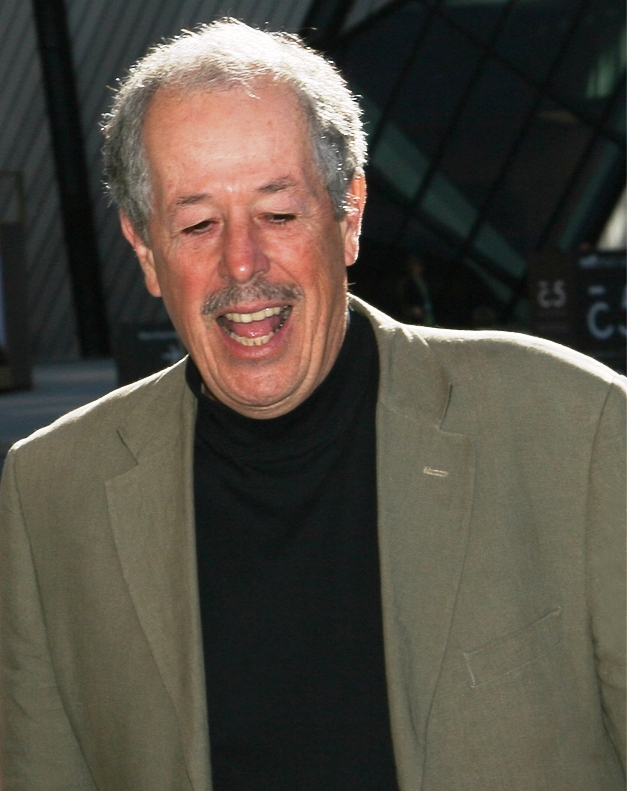
Director Denys Arcand wrote the script influenced by a small budget and seeing an interest in personal pleasures as becoming predominant in society.

In the wake of the 1980 Quebec referendum, director Denys Arcand felt Quebec's interests had shifted from politics to "individual pleasures", and with a budget of $800,000 for his next project, envisioned a dialogue-heavy film like Louis Malle's 1981 film My Dinner with Andre. Arcand viewed sex as the most likely topic that could sustain audience interest for an entire film. He worked on the screenplay throughout the summer of 1984, under the working title Conversations scabreuses. He chose tenured university professors as his subject matter because he felt that such people had less of a Quebecois accent, which would make the film more accessible to French-speaking audiences around the world. He avoided naming local places for the same reason, even though this went against the wishes of the National Film Board of Canada, which co-sponsored the film.

As Arcand worked on the script, producer Roger Frappier saw the story as promising and lobbied René Malo to co-produce, allowing for a bigger budget. Frappier and Malo raised $1.8 million, allowing for more settings depicted in the film. Most of the funding came from the governments of Canada and Quebec.

Arcand had Rémy Girard and Yves Jacques in mind for principal roles after working with them on The Crime of Ovide Plouffe (Le Crime d'Ovide Plouffe) (1984), and named the main character Rémy after Girard. Nevertheless, their lack of celebrity meant Girard had to audition for the part named for him, to satisfy producers.

=== Filming ===
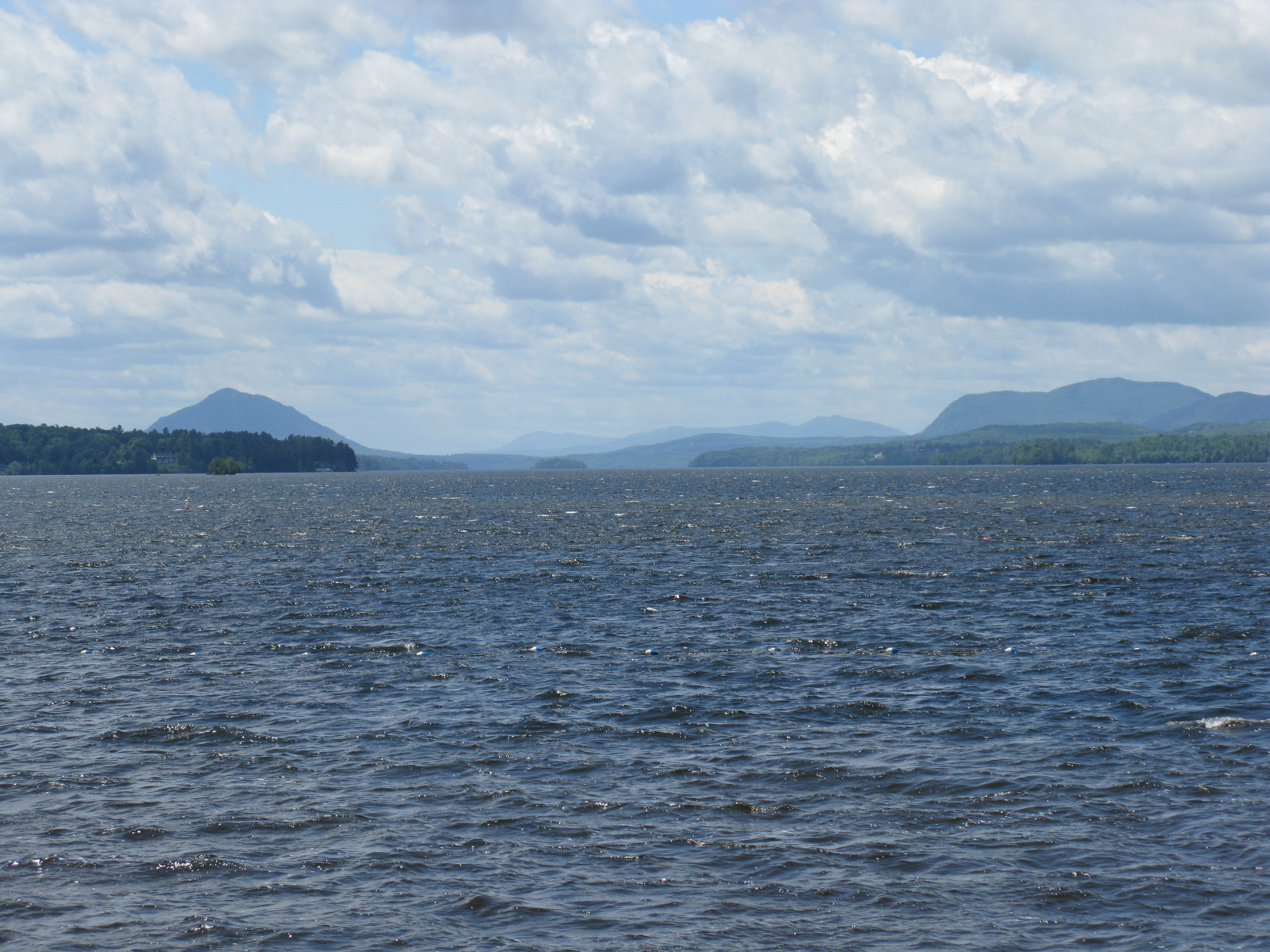
Filming took place near Lake Memphremagog in Quebec from September to October 1985.

Filming began in Montreal in August 1985, and moved to Lake Memphremagog in September, finishing in October. Filmmaker Jacques Leduc is given credit for photographing the nature scenes in the film.

In filming sex scenes, Arcand felt visual depictions were overused, which is why he focused on the verbal aspect. He also felt the sex scenes were challenging because of actors' modesty, and sought to place the camera in novel positions.

== Release ==
The film was screened at the 1986 Cannes Film Festival, where it received a 20-minute standing ovation, after which distribution to 60 countries was assured. In Canada, the film premiered in Montreal on 20 June, and opened across the country in September and October.

== Reception and legacy ==
=== Box office ===
The film was screened for months in Montreal and Paris and was the highest-grossing film ever in Quebec, making $2.2 million in the province alone. Outside Quebec, the film made $1 million in Canada. In France, it drew an audience of 1,236,322 people, the highest for a Quebec film ever. The film ultimately made $30 million.

=== Critical response ===
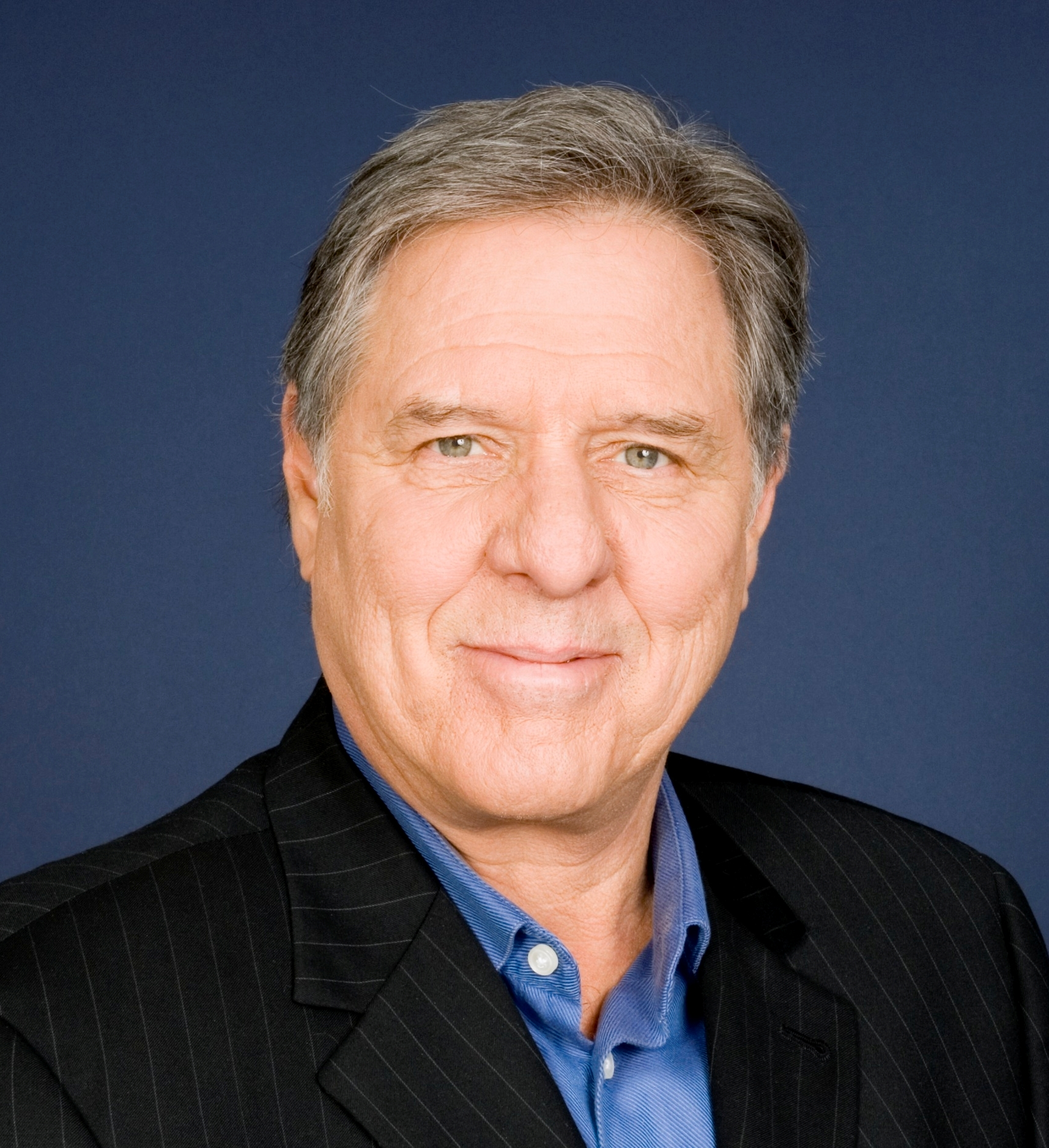
Critics gave positive reviews to the cast, including Pierre Curzi, who was nominated for the Genie Award for Best Actor.

The Decline of the American Empire has an approval rating of 86% on review aggregator website Rotten Tomatoes, based on 14 reviews, and an average rating of 7.3/10. Metacritic assigned the film a weighted average score of 60 out of 100, based on 5 critics, indicating "mixed or average reviews".

Roger Ebert gave the film three stars, saying that despite the sexual dialogue, "the real subject is wit", and comparing it to My Dinner with Andre. Vincent Canby of The New York Times wrote "Not since Alain Tanner's Jonah Who Will Be 25 in the Year 2000 has there been a comedy that so entertainingly and successfully expresses itself through intelligent characters defined entirely in their talk", and called the cast, including Rémy Girard and Pierre Curzi, "excellent". Rita Kempley of The Washington Post found most characters unlikable but wrote "The Decline of the American Empire is certainly the year's most intellectual work, a frequently funny, unrepressed meditation on midnight in North America". Peter Keough of the Chicago Reader wrote "The laughs come easy in Decline, but also a bit guiltily when you recognize that this hip sex comedy is actually a reactionary tract", given what he saw as the ending's victory for "traditional heterosexuality" while the homosexual character had an STD. David Denby of New York magazine panned the film, calling it "pompous and tiresome". In France, many critics highlighted the film's use of Quebec's natural landscape.

The Toronto International Film Festival ranked it in the Top 10 Canadian Films of All Time twice, in 1993 and 2004. Shortly after the release of the sequel The Barbarian Invasions in 2003, the British Film Institute called The Decline of the American Empire "a witty and provocative look at the battle of the sexes". In 2011, marking the 25th anniversary of the film, Isabelle Houde of the Montreal-based La Presse remarked the film was daring for 1986 in portraying homosexuality as normal.

In 2023, Barry Hertz of The Globe and Mail named the film as one of the 23 best Canadian comedy films ever made.

=== Accolades ===
The film won nine Genie Awards in 1987, including Best Motion Picture and Best Director and Best Original Screenplay for Arcand. It also received the FIPRESCI Prize at the Cannes Film Festival.

The film was nominated for the Academy Award for Best Foreign Language Film at the 59th Academy Awards, the first Canadian film so honoured. Garth Drabinsky, who handled the distribution of the film in the United States, hired Renee Furst to promote the film's Oscar nomination. Telefilm Canada contributed $50,000, under the stipulation that it would only be repaid if the film won an Oscar. The Assault from the Netherlands would eventually win he award. The Decline of the American Empire's sequel, The Barbarian Invasions (Les Invasions barbares), would go on to win Canada's first Oscar in the category in 2003.

Award	Date of ceremony	Category	Recipient(s)	Result	Ref(s)
Academy Awards	30 March 1987	Best Foreign Language Film	Canada	Nominated	
Cannes Film Festival	8 – 19 May 1986	FIPRESCI Prize	Denys Arcand	Won	
Chicago International Film Festival	November 1986	Silver Hugo Award	Denys Arcand	Won	
Genie Awards	1987	Best Motion Picture	Roger Frappier and René Malo	Won	
Genie Awards	1987	Best Direction	Denys Arcand	Won	
Genie Awards	1987	Best Actor	Pierre Curzi	Nominated	
Genie Awards	1987	Best Actor	Rémy Girard	Nominated	
Genie Awards	1987	Best Actress	Dorothée Berryman	Nominated	
Genie Awards	1987	Best Supporting Actor	Gabriel Arcand	Won	
Genie Awards	1987	Best Supporting Actor	Yves Jacques	Nominated	
Genie Awards	1987	Best Supporting Actress	Louise Portal	Won	
Genie Awards	1987	Best Supporting Actress	Geneviève Rioux	Nominated	
Genie Awards	1987	Best Original Screenplay	Denys Arcand	Won	
Genie Awards	1987	Best Editing	Monique Fortier	Won	
Genie Awards	1987	Best Sound	Adrian Croll, Jean-Pierre Joutel and Richard Besse	Won	
Genie Awards	1987	Best Sound Editing	Paul Dion, Diane Boucher and Andy Malcolm	Won	
Genie Awards	1987	Golden Reel Award	The Decline of the American Empire	Won	
New York Film Critics Circle	25 January 1987	Best Foreign Language Film	The Decline of the American Empire	Won	
Toronto International Film Festival	4 – 13 September 1986	Best Canadian Feature Film	The Decline of the American Empire	Won	
Toronto International Film Festival	4 – 13 September 1986	People's Choice Award	The Decline of the American Empire	Won	

== Sequels and proposed remake ==
Paramount Pictures purchased the rights to remake the film in English. David Giler was hired to write the script. Charles Champlin stated that Giler was an "art vandal" for being involved.

The Barbarian Invasions, released in 2003, uses the same characters as The Decline of the American Empire and presents an aftermath to the ending of the first film, having Rémy's marriage end, and is thus a sequel. Before 2007, critics called the two films, along with Arcand's 1989 film Jesus of Montreal, the "Montreal trilogy" because of their shared setting and allegory. There are also characters from Jesus of Montreal in The Barbarian Invasions.

In 2007, Arcand's film Days of Darkness was released. This film, along with The Decline of the American Empire and The Barbarian Invasions, was considered to complete a trilogy "about where Western civilization stands in the run-up to and the aftermath of the new millennium". The Decline character Pierre, played by Pierre Curzi, also appears in Days of Darkness to update his story from The Barbarian Invasions. Arcand's 2018 film, The Fall of the American Empire, continued themes of money degrading civilization, although it was not a direct sequel to The Decline of the American Empire apart from its similar name.

== See also ==
- List of submissions to the 59th Academy Awards for Best Foreign Language Film
- List of Canadian submissions for the Academy Award for Best Foreign Language Film
- America Empire Book
