= Laurent Gagliardi =

Canadian screenwriter and film director

Laurent Gagliardi (born October 18, 1948, in Montreal, Quebec) is a Canadian screenwriter and film director. He is most noted as cowriter with Léa Pool and Michel Langlois of the screenplay for The Savage Woman (La Demoiselle sauvage), for which the trio received a Genie Award nomination for Best Adapted Screenplay at the 12th Genie Awards in 1991, and as the director of the films The Night of the Visitor (La Nuit du visiteur), which was a Genie nominee for Best Theatrical Short Film in the same year, and When Love Is Gay (Quand l'amour est gai), the first documentary film on homosexuality ever released by the French division of the National Film Board of Canada.
