= Cynthia Scott =

Canadian film director, producer, screenwriter and editor (b. 1939)

- Born: 1 January 1939 (age 87); Winnipeg, Manitoba, Canada
- Occupations: Film director, screenwriter, film editor, film producer

Cynthia Scott (born January 1, 1939) is a Canadian award-winning filmmaker who has produced, directed, written, and edited several films with the National Film Board of Canada (NFB). Her works have won the Oscar and Canadian Film Award. Scott is a member of the Royal Canadian Academy of Arts. Her projects with the NFB are mainly focused on documentary filmmaking. Some of Scott's most notable documentaries for the NFB feature dancing and the dance world including Flamenco at 5:15 (1983), which won an Academy Award for Best Documentary (Short Subject) at the 56th Academy Awards in 1984. She is married to filmmaker John N. Smith; their son is actor Dylan Smith.

== Background ==
Cynthia Scott was born and raised in Winnipeg, Manitoba. She studied English Literature and Philosophy at the University of Manitoba, graduating with a B.A. in 1959.

== Early career in media ==
After graduation, Scott worked at the Manitoba Theatre Centre as a second assistant director before moving to London, England where she worked as a researcher for Patrick Wilson and Douglas Leiterman on This Hour Has Seven Days. In 1965, she returned to Canada and began working as a public affairs producer for the Canadian Broadcasting Corporation television program Take 30, where she stayed for nearly a decade. Scott insists that her intrigue in film started at a very young age. Despite her interest in filmmaking, Scott explains that she originally believed that director work was solely for men and that directing positions were unattainable for women. In her interview with Sarah Kernochan Scott gives credit to her job as an assistant to a producer at the Manitoba Theatre Centre for showing her that women could also do this work. After working in television Scott learned that she wished to pursue filmmaking. Scott has stated that her filmmaking career began in documentaries then later on in her career her interest shifted to drama. Scott claims that she gained the ability to produce films without experiencing gender discrimination by creating a name for herself after winning an Oscar award or her documentary Flamenco at 5:15.

== Filmmaking with the NFB ==
Scott's career took a turn in 1972 when the National Film Board of Canada hired her as a staff director. She immediately began directing, producing and writing both documentary and fiction pieces for the NFB. She mainly worked on slice-of-life documentaries with a mind for social issues. In her first year with the NFB, she directed a 26-minute documentary named The Ungrateful Land: Roch Carrier Remembers Ste-Justine (1972). Her debut directing work would then go on to win a Canadian Film Award for direction in a TV Information program. In 1976, Scott produced the controversial Barbara Greene documentary Listen Listen Listen (1976) for the NFB.

Once she had been working at the NFB for about a decade, she co-wrote, co-edited and co-produced a NFB joint project titled For The Love of Dance (1981). Over the next several years, Scott would work on several documentaries set in the dance world, including Flamenco at 5:15 (1983), which won an Academy Award for Best Documentary Short Subject.

She also researched and co-wrote First Winter (1981), directed by John N. Smith (her spouse and fellow filmmaker), which received an Academy Award nomination for Best Live Action Short at the 54th Academy Awards.

During her time with the National Film Board of Canada, Scott went on to participate in a women in the directors chair workshop in Banff, Alberta. In her Sarah Kernochan interview Scott describes this intensive workshop is an opportunity to educate and bring women directors together.

== The Company of Strangers ==
In the late 1980s, Scott began developing a full-length docufiction film with the NFB featuring eight non-actresses, all but one of whom were senior citizens. The Company of Strangers (US title: Strangers in Good Company), released in 1990, features a heavily improvised script based on the real lives of the women cast. The film was a huge success in both Canada and international markets; it became the highest grossing NFB produced film ever at the time.

In an interview with Sarah Kernochan, Scott stated that while she was working on the film her production team members were all women. Scott chose to have a strictly female team in order to place emphasis on the importance of women in the film industry supporting each other. Scott's team for this movie consisted of female assistants, producers, writers and artists.

== Flamenco at 5:15 ==
Cynthia Scott directed the short documentary film Flamenco at 5:15. The film was released in 1983. Flamenco at 5:15 is an Oscar award winning film that jump started Scott's career. Flamenco at 5:15 focuses on the reality of what it is like to be inside a Flamenco dance class at the National Ballet of Canada. Flamenco at 5:15 went on to win the best short documentary award at the 56th annual Academy Awards.

== After career ==
Scott was diagnosed with cancer while she was developing an adaptation of The Stone Diaries, a 1993 fictional autobiography written by Carol Shields. She said she plans to go back into development on The Stone Diaries once her health has returned to normal.

In a 2004 interview with Sarah Kernochan, Scott described herself as "retired now".

In an interview about the success of her film The Company of Strangers, Scot said that she wants to learn to speak French fluently. Scott and her husband John N. Smith have spent a number of summers residing on currant lake in Dunany, Quebec. The Dunany community organization honoured Scott by holding an event at the community club house where her Oscar award winning documentary Flamenco at 5:15 was screened.

== Filmography ==
=== Director filmography ===
- The Ungrateful Land: Roch Carrier Remembers Ste-Justine (1972)
- Some Natives of Churchill (1973)
- Scoggie (1975)
- For the Love of Dance (1981) (co-directed with John N. Smith, Michael McKennirey and David Wilson)
- Flamenco at 5:15 (1983)
- Discussions in Bioethics: A Chronic Problem (1985)
- Jack of Hearts (1986)
- The Company of Strangers (1990)

=== Co-writer filmography ===
- First Winter (1982) (co-written with Gloria Demers)
- The Company of Strangers (1990) (co-written with David Wilson, Sally Bochner and Gloria Demers)

=== Producer filmography ===
- Take 30 series (1965–1972) (TV, 71 episodes) (co-producer)
- Man Alive: Jack Chambers (1971)
- West series: Ruth and Harriet: Two Women of the Piece (1973)
- West series: Every Saturday Night
- Some Natives of Churchill (1973)
- Listen Listen Listen (1976) (co-produced with Roman Kroitor)
- Canada Vignettes: Holidays (1978)
- Canada Vignettes: The Thirties (1978)
- You've Got the Power: Arioli: Running (1979)
- You've Got the Power: Teenagers (1979)
- Man of Might: Fit In (1979)
- For the Love of Dance (1981) (co-produced with John N. Smith, Michael McKennirey, David Wilson and Adam Symansky)
- Flamenco at 5:15 (1983) (co-produced with Adam Symansky)

=== Co-editor filmography ===
- For the Love of Dance (1981) (co-edited with John N. Smith, Micheal McKennirey and David Wilson)
- Flamenco at 5:15 (1983) (co-edited with Paul Demers)

== Awards and nominations ==
The Ungrateful Land: Roch Carrier Remembers Ste-Justine (1972):

- Canadian Film Awards: Best TV Information Programme - won

First Winter (1982):

- 54th Academy Awards: Best Live Action Short - nominated

Flamenco at 5:15 (1983):

- 56th Academy Awards: Best Documentary Short - won

The Company of Strangers (1990):

- fr:Association québécoise des critiques de cinéma: Best Quebec Feature Film - won
- 12th Genie Awards: Best Picture - nominated
- 12th Genie Awards: Film Editing - won
- Paris Lesbian and Feminist Film Festival: Best Feature Film
- Vancouver International Film Festival: Most Popular Canadian Film
- International Filmfestival Mannheim-Heidelberg: Grand Newcomer Award

== See also ==
- List of female film and television directors
- List of LGBT-related films directed by women
