= Saeed (film) =

- Directed by: Mehra Meh
- Release date: 1991
- Running time: 23 minutes
- Country: Canada
- Language: English

Saeed is a Canadian dramatic short film, directed by Mehra Meh and released in 1991. The film centres on the difficulties faced by an Iranian refugee as he tries to integrate into Canadian society.

The film won the Genie Award for Best Theatrical Short Film at the 12th Genie Awards in 1991.
