= Malignant (2013 film) =

2013 American horror film

- Theatrical release poster
- Directed by: Brian Avenet-Bradley
- Written by: Brian Avenet-Bradley
- Produced by: Laurence Avenet-Bradley
- Starring: Gary Cairns; Brad Dourif
- Cinematography: Laurence Avenet-Bradley
- Music by: Mark Lee Flectcher
- Production companies: Modernciné; Avenet Images Productions
- Distributed by: Gravitas
- Release date: October 4, 2013 (Shriekfest)
- Running time: 84 minutes
- Country: United States
- Language: English

Malignant is a 2013 American horror film written and directed by Brian Avenet-Bradley. It stars Gary Cairns and Brad Dourif as a patient who undergoes involuntary treatment to cure his alcoholism and the mad doctor who performs it, respectively.

== Synopsis ==
After his wife dies, Alex becomes a self-destructive alcoholic. A mysterious doctor shows Alex the consequences of his actions, and the involuntary treatment leaves Alex with incisions. The doctor explains that whenever Alex drinks to excess, an implant will force him to violently murder people.

== Cast ==
- Gary Cairns as Alex
- Brad Dourif as The Man
- Nick Nicotera as Chad
- Sienna Farall as Emily
- Steve Wastell as Charlie
- Jennifer Blanc as Gail

== Production ==
Dourif said that he was approached by the filmmakers and accepted the role because he found the character interesting. Dourif said that the character feigns sympathy, which makes him easier to portray as somewhat sympathetic.

== Release ==
Malignant premiered at Shriekfest in Los Angeles on October 4, 2013. It was released to video on demand in May 2014. The DVD was released February 17, 2015.

== Reception ==
Pat Torfe of Bloody Disgusting rated it 2.5/5 stars and wrote, "Diehard fans of Dourif may get some enjoyment out of seeing him strut his stuff, but it's ultimately not enough for this film to be entertaining." Scott Hallam of Dread Central rated it 2.5/5 stars and wrote, "The casting of Brad Dourif as a maniacal scientist was a brilliant move that took a movie that might have been a throwaway and elevated it to at least a satisfactory level." Ross Peterson of HorrorNews.Net wrote that Dourif's character is far more interesting and is not given enough screen time in comparison to the lead. Mark L. Miller of Ain't It Cool News wrote, "Brian Avenet-Bradley has constructed a solid thriller here with a strong mystery, characters you can't help but feel for, and a diabolical and bent villain in Dourif."
