= Monique Fortier =

Canadian film editor (1928–2025)

- Born: July 6, 1928; Montreal, Quebec, Canada
- Died: August 18, 2025 (aged 97); Saint-Donat, Quebec, Canada
- Occupations: Film editor and director
- Years active: 1950s–1999
- Notable work: The Decline of the American Empire
- Awards: Genie Award for Best Editing (1987)

Monique Fortier (July 6, 1928 – August 18, 2025) was a Canadian film editor. She was most noted for her work on the film The Decline of the American Empire (Le Déclin de l'empire américain), for which she won the Genie Award for Best Editing at the 8th Genie Awards in 1987.

== Life and career ==
Fortier was born in Montreal on July 6, 1928. She began her career with the National Film Board of Canada in the 1950s, becoming one of the first women to work for the organization. Although she worked principally as an editor, she was also director of the short documentary film The Hour of Independence (À l’heure de la décolonisation) in 1963, making her the first French Canadian woman to direct an NFB film. She also subsequently directed La beauté mème in 1964, but devoted her career primarily to editing thereafter.

Her other credits include the films September Five at Saint-Henri (À St-Henri le cinq septembre), The River Schooners (Les Voitures d'eau), Acadia, Acadia (L'Acadie, L'Acadie?!?), The Crime of Ovide Plouffe (Le Crime d'Ovide Plouffe), Au chic resto pop and The Big Snake of the World (Le Grand serpent du monde). She received a Genie Award nomination for Best Editing at the 6th Genie Awards in 1985, for her work on The Crime of Ovide Plouffe. She received a second Genie Award nomination for Best Editing at the 8th Genie Awards two years later in 1987, for her work on The Decline of the American Empire, which she won this time.

In 2014, she was the subject of Making Movie History: Monique Fortier, a short documentary film by Denys Desjardins.

Fortier died in Saint-Donat, Lanaudière on August 18, 2025, at the age of 97.

== Filmography ==
| Year | Title | Notes | Reference |
|---|---|---|---|
| 1961 | Courtship (Le Temps des amours) | Editor | |
| 1962 | Strangers for the Day (Pour quelques arpents de neige) | Co-editor (with Jacques Godbout and Georges Dufaux) | |
| 1962 | September Five at Saint-Henri (À St-Henri le cinq septembre) | Editor | |
| 1963 | The Hour of Independence (À l’heure de la décolonisation) | Director and editor | |
| 1964 | Villeneuve, peintre-barbier | Editor | |
| 1964 | La beauté même | Writer, director and editor | |
| 1965 | Ville-Marie (Les Montréalistes) | Editor | |
| 1965 | Stravinsky | Editor | |
| 1965 | Les Départs nécessaires | Editor | |
| 1967 | FLQ | Editor | |
| 1968 | Les bombes | Editor | |
| 1968 | The River Schooners (Les Voitures d'eau) | Editor | |
| 1968 | Swing la baquaise | Editor | |
| 1969 | La guerre des pianos | Editor | |
| 1971 | Acadia, Acadia (L'Acadie, L'Acadie?!?) | Editor | |
| 1971 | César's Bark Canoe (César et son canot d'écorce) | Editor | |
| 1972 | Chez nous, c'est chez nous | Editor | |
| 1972 | Quebec: Duplessis and After (Québec : Duplessis et après...) | Acknowledged as "with the help of [Monique Fortier]" | |
| 1973 | Les raquettes des Atcikameg | Editor | |
| 1974 | Les Filles du Roy | Participant | |
| 1975 | Jean Carignan, Fiddler (Jean Carignan, violoneux) | Editor | |
| 1977 | Le goût de la farine | Editor | |
| 1977 | Damase Breton, cordonnier | Editor | |
| 1980 | Land Without Trees, or the Mouchouânipi (Le pays de la terre sans arbre ou Le mouchouânipi) | Editor | |
| 1981 | Fermont, P.Q. | Editor | |
| 1982 | Plenty of Nothing (Madame, vous avez rien) | Editor | |
| 1983 | Les voiles bas et en travers | Editor | |
| 1984 | The Last Glacier (Le dernier glacier) | Editor | |
| 1984 | The Crime of Ovide Plouffe (Le Crime d'Ovide Plouffe) | Editor | |
| 1985 | La grande allure | Two part documentary, editor for both parts | |
| 1986 | The Decline of the American Empire (Le Déclin de l'empire américain) | Editor | |
| 1986 | Bam Pay A!: Rends-moi mon pays! | Editor | |
| 1988 | Alias Will James | Editor | |
| 1988 | Liberty Street Blues | Editor | |
| 1989 | The Studio (L'Atelier) | Editor | |
| 1990 | Au chic resto pop | Editor | |
| 1990 | Pour l'amour du stress | Editor | |
| 1991 | The Norman William Affair (L'affaire Norman William) | Editor | |
| 1992 | Papa | Editor | |
| 1992 | The Black Sheep (Le Mouton noir) | Editor | |
| 1993 | Doctors with Heart (Médecins de coeur) | Editor | |
| 1993 | Expectations (L'Attente) | Editor | |
| 1997 | The Fate of America (Le sort de l'Amérique) | Editor | |
| 1997 | Tu as crié Let Me Go | Co-editor (with Yves Dion) | |
| 1999 | The Big Snake of the World (Le Grand serpent du monde) | Final credit as editor | |
| 2011 | The Private Life of Cinema (La vie privée du cinéma) | Self | |
| 2014 | Making Movie History: Monique Fortier | Self | |

== Awards and nominations ==
| Year | Association | Category | Work | Result | Reference |
|---|---|---|---|---|---|
| 1985 | Genie Awards | Best Editing | The Crime of Ovide Plouffe (Le Crime d'Ovide Plouffe) | Nominated | |
| 1987 | Genie Awards | Best Editing | The Decline of the American Empire (Le Déclin de l'empire américain) | Won | |
