= The Night of the Visitor =

- French: La nuit du visiteur
- Directed by: Laurent Gagliardi
- Written by: Michel Langlois
- Produced by: René Gueissaz
- Starring: Macha Grenon; Luce Guilbeault; Maka Kotto
- Cinematography: Éric Cayla
- Edited by: Werner Nold
- Music by: Michel Arcand; Stéphane Hénault
- Production companies: ACPAV; National Film Board of Canada
- Release date: 1990
- Running time: 13 minutes
- Country: Canada
- Language: French

The Night of the Visitor (French: La nuit du visiteur) is a Canadian drama short film, directed by Laurent Gagliardi and released in 1990. The film centres on the residents of a small apartment building, depicting their own personal dramas on the night that a young man is knocking at the front door asking to be let in the building.

The film's cast includes Daniel Brière, Monique Chabot, Hugolin Chevrette-Landesque, Macha Grenon, Luce Guilbeault, Maka Kotto, Roger Léger, Claude Prégent and Mirella Tomassini.

The film was a Genie Award nominee for Best Theatrical Short Film at the 12th Genie Awards in 1991.
