= Nina Petronzio =

American interior & furniture designer

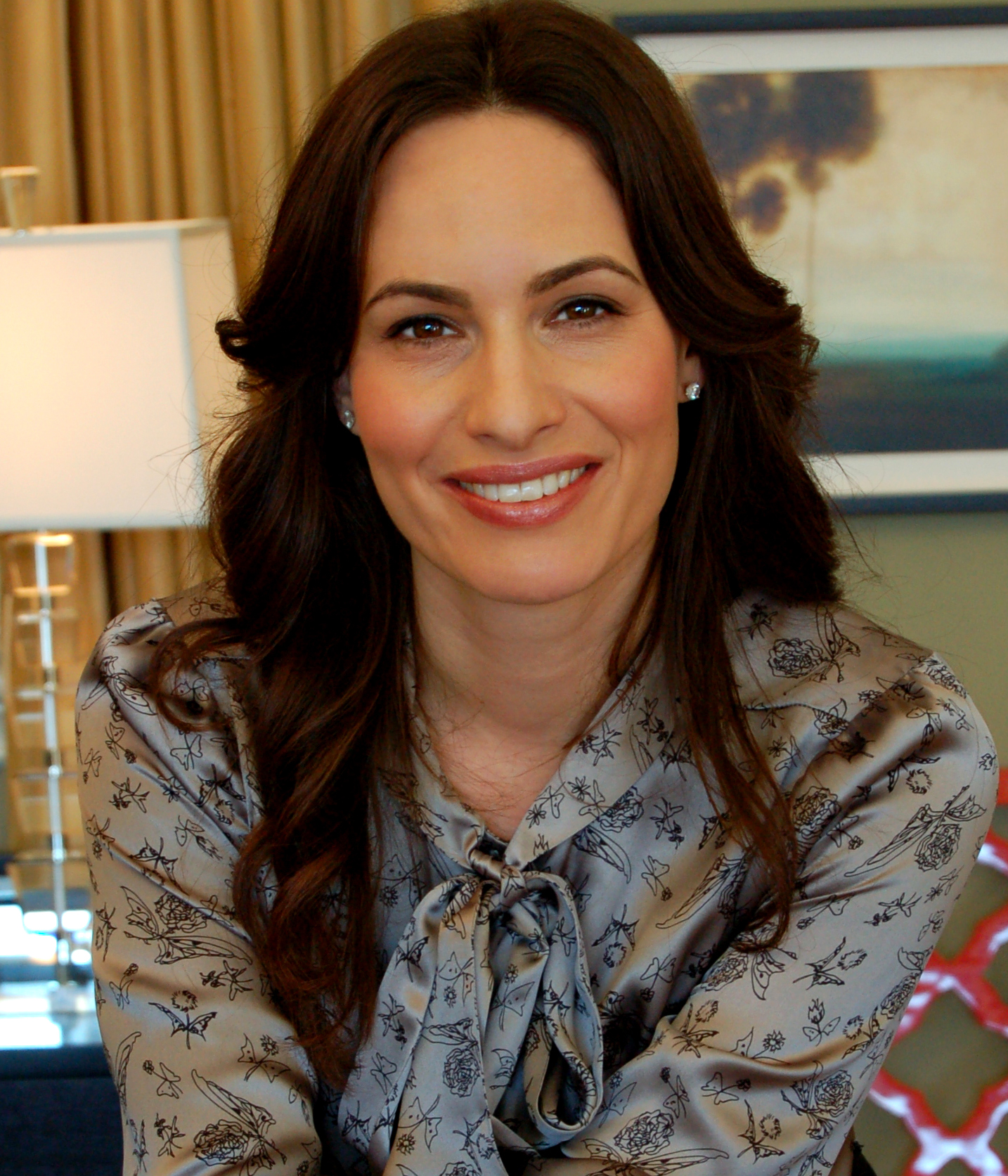
- Born: 15 October 1979 (age 46); Victoria County, Nova Scotia, Canada
- Occupations: Interior designer; furniture designer; actress
- Years active: 1990−present
- Known for: Transitional style designs; Plush Home; Vincent and Me
- Spouse: Steven Ho
- Children: 2
- Website: ninapetronzio.com

Nina Petronzio (born 15 October 1979) is a Canadian American interior and furniture designer, and actress. An ASID Industry member, she is best known for her high-end, Transitional style interior designs and Plush Home furniture line.

== Childhood ==
Nina Petronzio was born in Victoria County, Nova Scotia, Canada, to New York artists who were inspired to open an art foundry after her father, bronze sculptor Robertino Petronzio returned from his studies at the prestigious Accademia di Belle Arti Firenze in Florence, Italy.

At age eleven, she was cast to play the female lead character, Jo, in the film Vincent and Me. Tcheky Karyo played the role of Vincent van Gogh. The film was shot in the Netherlands, France and Quebec, and her performance won her a nomination for a Genie Award for Best Performance by an Actress in a Leading Role (1991). At the time, Petronzio was the youngest actor to ever have been nominated for a Genie Award. The film's small screen release in the United States by Disney was awarded an Emmy for Outstanding Children's Special.

Her travels for the European release and film festival circuit of Vincent and Me introduced her to a sensibility of fashion, architecture, and style that she had not yet been exposed to in the woods of Nova Scotia. Visiting her ancestral Italy, where her father learned sculpture, is what initially piqued Nina's interest in interior design, home building, and furniture.

== Design career ==
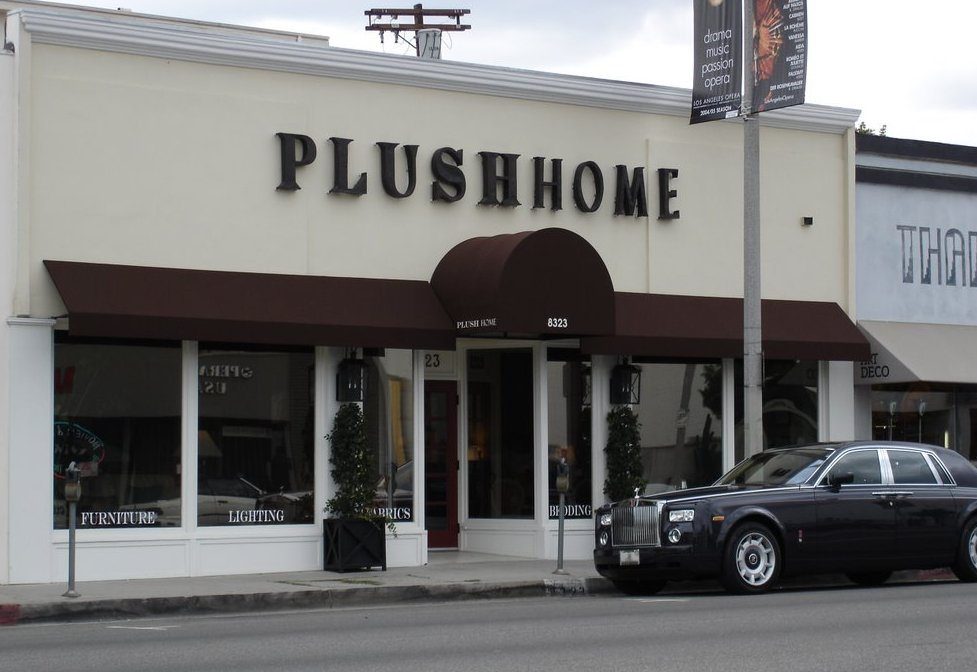
Nina Petronzio's flagship showroom (Plush Home) is located in the heart of the Melrose Place fashion district on Melrose Avenue in West Hollywood, California

Petronzio founded her Melrose Avenue interior design firm and furniture line, Plush Home in West Hollywood, California, with her husband Steven Ho in 2003. Known for her celebrity and discerning clientele, Petronzio is well known for her high-end, transitional style interior and furniture designs, fabric selections, and custom home plans. She has designed private projects for Mark Wahlberg, Leonardo DiCaprio, Neve Campbell, James Franco. Her work has been praised and featured in publications ranging from Elle Decor to The Franklin Report.

Production Designers have specified Petronzio's furniture line in their film and television projects, including Spider-Man 2, Mission: Impossible 2, Curb Your Enthusiasm (2009), Nip/Tuck, The Island and Heroes.

== Personal life ==
She is married to martial artist Steven Ho, and they have two sons together.

== Filmography ==
Petronzio has acted on several occasions, including her acclaimed performance in Vincent and Me.

Year	Film	Role	Notes
1990	Vincent and Me	Josephine "Jo" Tetley	
1993	Maniac Mansion	Myra	TV series (1 episode)
1997	Scream 2	Mopey Girl	
1998	Beyond Paradise	Suzy	
2000	Big Wind on Campus	Lily	
2002	Buying the Cow	Cynthia	Direct-to-video
