= Au chic resto pop =

1990 Canadian documentary film

- Directed by: Tahani Rached
- Written by: Tahani Rached
- Produced by: Éric Michel
- Cinematography: Jacques Leduc
- Edited by: Monique Fortier
- Music by: Steve Faulkner
- Production company: National Film Board of Canada
- Release date: 1990
- Running time: 84 minutes
- Country: Canada
- Language: French

Au chic resto pop is a Canadian documentary film, directed by Tahani Rached and released in 1990. The film centres on poverty in the Montreal borough of Hochelaga-Maisonneuve, in part through a portrait of a community soup kitchen.

The film received a Genie Award nomination for Best Feature Length Documentary at the 12th Genie Awards in 1991.
