= Cargo (1990 film) =

1990 Canadian drama film

- Directed by: François Girard
- Written by: Marcel Beaulieu; François Girard; Michel Langlois
- Produced by: François Forest; Bruno Jobin
- Starring: Geneviève Rioux; Michel Dumont; Guy Thauvette
- Cinematography: Daniel Jobin
- Edited by: Gaétan Huot
- Music by: Gaëtan Gravel; Bill Vorn
- Production companies: Cléo 24; Velvet Camera
- Distributed by: Prima Film
- Release date: October 22, 1990 (FNC)
- Running time: 90 minutes
- Country: Canada
- Language: French

Cargo is a Canadian drama film, directed by François Girard and released in 1990. Girard's feature film debut, the film centres on a sailing trip undertaken by Alice (Geneviève Rioux), her father Philippe (Michel Dumont) and her lover Marcel (Guy Thauvette). After they are caught in a violent storm which kills Philippe but from which Alice and Marcel are rescued, Philippe is left alone wandering a ghost ship and struggling to make sense of his fate.

The film premiered in October 1990 at the Festival du nouveau cinéma.

Daniel Jobin received a Genie Award nomination for Best Cinematography at the 12th Genie Awards in 1991.
