= Michel Langlois =

Canadian film director and screenwriter

- Occupations: film director, screenwriter
- Known for: A Woman in Transit (La Femme de l'hôtel), The Savage Woman (La Demoiselle sauvage), Cap Tourmente

Michel Langlois is a Canadian film director and screenwriter from Quebec. He is a two-time nominee for the Genie Award for Best Screenplay, garnering nominations at the 6th Genie Awards in 1985 for A Woman in Transit (La Femme de l'hôtel) and at the 12th Genie Awards in 1991 for The Savage Woman (La Demoiselle sauvage).

His other screenwriting credits include Lessons on Life (Trois pommes à côté du sommeil), The Night of the Visitor (La nuit du visiteur) and Cargo.

As a director, he made the short films Sortie 234 and Lettre à mon père before releasing his feature debut, Cap Tourmente, in 1993.

Following Cap Tourmente, however, Langlois has concentrated exclusively on documentary films. His first documentary, released in 2002, was Le fil cassé, an exploration of his own family genealogy. The film, whose title translates as The Broken Thread, was inspired by the fact that as a gay man he would not be fathering children, and thus documenting his ancestry would be his primary contribution to the family history. He followed up with Mère et monde, a documentary about the family whose small inn in Saint-Joseph-de-la-Rive had inspired Cap Tourmente, in 2009; and Anne des vingt jours, a biographical documentary about writer Anne Hébert, in 2013.
