= The Franklin Report =

- Type: Privately held
- Industry: Publishing: Internet & Books
- Founded: 1999
- Founder: Elizabeth Franklin
- Headquarters: New York
- Area served: New York, Los Angeles, Chicago, Connecticut/Westchester, Southeast Florida: Palm Beach-to-Miami
- Key people: Elizabeth Franklin, Founder & CEO
- Products: Regional Books, Internet Content
- Website: www.franklinreport.com

The Franklin Report's guidebook for New York City

The Franklin Report is an independently published guidebook that primarily rates home maintenance and renovation providers such as interior decorators, architects, and contractors. According to The New York Times, it is the first publication to review and rate Interior Designers and Decorators Founded by CEO Elizabeth Franklin in 1999 to review companies in the New York City area, it now covers also Los Angeles, Chicago, Connecticut/Westchester, and the Palm Beach to Miami area in Florida. Initially sold in book form, The Franklin Report is now predominantly an online presence with a user review-based rating system. Town & Country magazine named it "the design version of the foodie bible Zagat.".

The Franklin Report has recently expanded to include home-based products as well as services and lifestyle services such as neighborhood dry cleaning, fitness centers, SAT tutoring, dog trainers, veterinarians and catering. The company is in the process of funding a venture capital round of financing.

== History ==
The Franklin Report was started by Elizabeth Franklin, the current CEO. While a partner on Wall Street, she managed a significant renovation of her family's Manhattan residence. With the coming of the Internet and the disappointment of an incompetent architect and an unreliable contractor, she conceived of the value of rating service for home renovation. The first edition, published in 2001, was based upon the recommendations of her friends and Christmas card list. New York was the first city with Los Angeles following in 2003. Chicago was published in 2005 and Connecticut/Westchester in 2007. Southeast Florida: Palm Beach to Miami was the first edition to be published solely online. The next announced editions will be San Francisco and Atlanta.

For two years, Franklin wrote a column in House Beautiful called "Ask Betsy." In 2003, Franklin won the Manhattan Chamber of Commerce New Business Award.

== Products, Services and Methods ==
Starting as a book business, the company soon became primarily internet-based. In New York, for example, the book has 1,000 entries, mostly architects, decorators and contractors. The New York website has over 2,000 entries and includes many lifestyle professionals such as veterinarians, hair salons and SAT tutors.

As reported in the Los Angeles Times, The Franklin Report "relies strictly on customer reviews and not deep-pocket advertisers". As further stated in the Times, vendors such as upholsterers who considered advertising in Architectural Digest for $10,000 have found the free listing in the Franklin Report to be much more valuable, generating "non-stop work from interior designers and celebrity clients."

For any given product or service, The Franklin Report encourages users to recommend their favorite sources. Only if there is a consensus of agreement on the reliability and value of a professional, will The Franklin Report then write their own review, based upon the views of past clients and industry experts. This differentiates The Franklin Report from their competition, as the other websites only allow for customer blogging, with no edited or curated content.

The website and the book are divided by region. Users can log in to their location of choice. From there, they can search by firm name, category, specialty or rating score.

Additionally, professionals may add pictures of their work or products online to add to the content of their write-up by purchasing a "Franklin Report Portfolio." As of March 2010, there were about 600 portfolios online in the five cities.

== Ratings ==
The Franklin Report rates each professional on four qualities: Quality, Cost, Value, and Recommendation. Each rating is on a scale of one to five. For example, a rating of five in "Cost" would entail that the professional's prices are "Over the top." Whereas a rating of five in "Recommendation" would mean that the vendor was the reviewer's "First And Only Choice."

== Reception ==
Publications such as the Chicago Tribune have noted that there are very few negative ratings in The Franklin Report reviews. The Franklin Report editors contend this occurs because only the most reliable and recommended professionals earn the right to receive a formal Franklin Report review. There are many companies that are not reviewed formally by The Franklin Report that were added by registered users online with distinctly negative comments.

Interior Design magazine reports that The Franklin Report is "clever, valuable and influential and wildly successful". USA Today also recommends that you “consult The Franklin Report.”

== See also ==
- Consumer Reports
- Yelp, Inc.
- Zagat
