= Transitional Style =

Interior design style

In interior design and furniture design, Transitional Style refers to a contemporary style mixing traditional and modern styles. It emerged in the mid-20th century, combining elements from both traditional and contemporary approaches. Distinguished by its balanced use of clean lines and comfortable furnishings, the style represents a deliberate fusion of historical and modern aesthetics.

The approach typically features neutral color schemes built around whites, creams, and grays, with visual interest created through varied textures rather than bold patterns or ornate details. While retaining some classical elements like crown molding and traditional furniture forms, transitional design simplifies these features to create spaces that feel both refined and welcoming.

Unlike contemporary design, which evolves with current trends, transitional style maintains consistent principles focused on merging formal architectural elements with casual comfort. This synthesis has made it a significant influence in residential and commercial design since its development.

== Features ==
The style combines curves with straight lines to create a design that balances masculine and feminine attributes, aiming to create a comfortable and relaxing style. A lack of ornamentation and decoration with minimal accessories keeps the focus on the simplicity and sophistication of the design. Color palettes are typically neutral and subtle and may be monochromatic, with color in art and accents rather than upholstery and floors.

Transitional style focuses on comfort and practicality, valuing form over function. Soft textures are often used in transitional furniture.

== Designers ==
21st century transitional style furniture designers include Nina Petronzio and Thomas Pheasant.
