= The Company of Strangers =

- DVD cover (United States)
- Directed by: Cynthia Scott
- Written by: Gloria Demers; Cynthia Scott; David Wilson; Sally Bochner
- Produced by: David Wilson
- Starring: Alice Diabo; Constance Garneau
- Cinematography: David De Volpi
- Edited by: David Wilson
- Music by: Marie Bernard
- Production company: National Film Board of Canada
- Distributed by: First Run Features; Castle Hill Productions; National Film Board of Canada
- Release date: 1990
- Running time: 101 min.
- Country: Canada
- Language: English
- Box office: $1,450,000

The Company of Strangers (US release title: Strangers in Good Company; French title: Le Fabuleux gang des sept) is a 1990 Canadian film directed by Cynthia Scott and written by Scott, Sally Bochner, David Wilson and Gloria Demers. The film depicts eight women on a bus tour, who are stranded at an isolated cottage when the bus breaks down.

== Synopsis ==
Created in a genre defined as docufiction, semi-documentary/semi-fiction, the film is not tightly scripted. The writers wrote a basic story outline but allowed the eight women to improvise their dialogue. Each of the women, all but one of whom were senior citizens, told stories from her own life. A major theme of the film is how the elderly women each face aging and mortality in their own way, and find the courage together to persevere.

The director uses documentary-style camera work and the acting is improvisational. Scott found her cast in nursing homes and senior citizen clubs, which includes: a nun, a Black woman, a lesbian, a Mohawk, an English woman and two genteel women. At various points throughout the film, a montage of photos from each woman's life is shown.

== Cast ==
- Alice Diabo as Alice, 74, a Mohawk elder from Kahnawake, Quebec,
- Constance Garneau as Constance, 88, born in the United States and brought to Quebec by her family as a child,
- Winifred Holden as Winnie, 76, an Englishwoman who moved to Montreal after World War II,
- Cissy Meddings as Cissy, 76, who was born in England and moved to Canada in 1981,
- Mary Meigs as Mary, 71, a noted feminist writer and painter and out lesbian,
- Catherine Roche as Catherine, 65, a Roman Catholic nun,
- Michelle Sweeney as Michelle, 27, a jazz singer and the bus trip's tour guide,
- Beth Webber as Beth, 80, who was born in England and moved to Montreal in 1930.

== Background and production ==
The seven women were chosen in 1988 by Scott after a series of tryouts at National Film Board of Canada headquarters in Montreal. Mary Meigs recalls that some of the women did not think they were "important enough" to be featured in a movie, while there were others who "didn't want to interrupt their lives; I was one of those; it seemed to me to be an interruption of a summer of painting and work."

== Release ==
The film was distributed by Alliance Distributing in Canada and First Run Features in the United States. It earned $450,000 during its theatrical release in Canada and $1 million in the United States. The Company of Strangers was renamed Strangers in Good Company in the United States to avoid confusion with The Comfort of Strangers.

== Home media ==
The DVD was released on 7 December 1999, by First Run Features as Strangers in Good Company. The back of the DVD cover states: "The original Canadian title, "The Company of Strangers" is on the DVD. In every other way it is the exact same film."

== Reception ==
The review aggregator website Rotten Tomatoes assigned the film a score of 100%, based on ten reviews.

Diana George of the Journal of Film and Video observed that the film "provides its viewers with the knowledge that each one of these women, like every woman growing old today, has a past, still might tell an off color joke, has survival skills, and is an important and interesting human being, not simply an old woman whose clothes are slightly out-of-date or whose songs recall the past."

Kathleen Maher wrote in The Austin Chronicle that "Scott plays upon the reality that we don't often see faces like these in movies, nor do we hear stories like these." She also observed "these women have stories to tell by virtue of their experience, their wit and their wisdom; it is an example of independent filmmaking at its best." Lois Hayes wrote in Gay Community News that the movie "is a funny, touching, life-affirming film; it's shot in some beautiful countryside and it contains a quiet drama wholly befitting its purpose: a glimpse into spirited old age, something that's awful hard to find in Hollywood."

Los Angeles Times film critic Michael Wilmington said "these women, as beguiling an ensemble as any recent film has given us, go about their simple chores, fishing, chatting, gathering frogs, and around them, the world has the sometimes terrible, transparent fragility the sky takes on in the hour before a storm; yet the movie doesn't try to emphasize impermanence; the sense of the storm is, instead, a means of seizing life.".

Jay Scott of The Globe and Mail wrote "kudos for the unqualified success of the film should go to David Wilson, the editor who whipped some 50 hours of stubborn celluloid footage into whipped cream and director Scott, who persuaded diffident women fearful of appearing on screen to become stars." Overall he concluded that "we leave The Company of Strangers reluctantly, not wanting to end a party to which we have been so luckily invited."

== Accolades ==
The film won the Best Canadian Film award at the Vancouver International Film Festival and the Grand Prize and Interfilm awards at the Mannheim-Heidelberg International Film Festival in 1990.

At the 12th Genie Awards in 1991, Diabo and Meddings were nominated for Best Actress, Holden and Roche were nominated for Best Supporting Actress, and the film was nominated for Best Picture. The film won the Genie Award for Best Film Editing.

== Novel ==
Mary Meigs wrote a book about her experience in making the film, In the Company of Strangers (1991).

== See also ==
- List of LGBT-related films directed by women
- Docufiction
- List of docufiction films
