= Allan Lee =

British film editor

- Born: Hamilton, Scotland
- Occupation: Film Editor

Allan Lee (born in Hamilton, Scotland) is a film editor who lives in Vancouver, Canada and works regularly in Europe, UK and Canada.

== Selected filmography ==
- 1993 – Highlander
- 1995 – Magic in the Water
- 1997 – Bliss
- 1997–2002 – Stargate SG-1
- 1998 – Da Vinci's Inquest
- 2000 – Suspicious River
- 2002 – No Night Is Too Long
- 2004 – Earthsea, The L Word
- 2005 – The 4400, Terminal City
- 2006 – Skinwalkers, Psych
- 2007 – Tin Man
- 2009 – Alice, Defying Gravity
- 2010 – The Lost Future
- 2011 – Neverland
- 2012 – Continuum, Missing
- 2013 – Eve of Destruction
- 2014 – Intruders
- 2015 – Olympus

== Awards ==
Gemini Awards 1999 • Nominated, Gemini Best Picture Editing in a Dramatic Program or Series for Da Vinci's Inquest (1998). Genie Awards 1991 • Nominated, Genie Best Achievement in Film Editing for Chaindance (1991). 1989 • Nominated, Genie Best Achievement in Film Editing for A Winter Tan (1987). Shared With: Susan Martin Leo Awards 2010 • Won, Leo Best Picture Editing in a Feature Length Drama for Alice (2009). Shared With: Peter Forslund 2008 • Nominated, Leo Best Picture Editing in a Dramatic Series for Tin Man (2007). Shared With: Peter Forslund • For night 1. 2005 • Won, Leo Feature Length Drama: Best Picture Editing for Earthsea (2004). 2001 • Nominated, Leo Best Picture Editing of Feature Length Drama for Suspicious River (2000). Primetime Emmy Awards 2008 • Nominated, Primetime Emmy Outstanding Single-Camera Picture Editing for a Miniseries or a Movie for Tin Man (2007). (Sci Fi Channel). • For part 1.
