= Léa Pool =

Canadian and Swiss filmmaker and screenwriter (born 1950)

Léa Pool CM
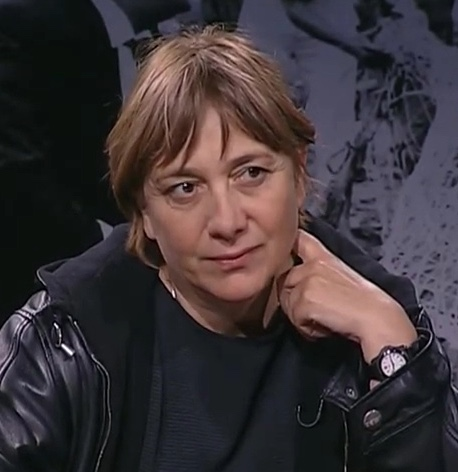
- Pool on CUNY TV's City Cinematheque, 2000
- Born: 8 September 1950 (age 75); Soglio, Switzerland
- Occupations: Filmmaker; screenwriter
- Years active: 1978–present

Léa Pool C.M. (born 8 September 1950) is a Canadian and Swiss filmmaker. She has directed several documentaries and feature films, many of which have won significant awards including the Prize of the Ecumenical Jury, and she was the first woman to win the prize for Best Film at the Quebec Cinema Awards. Pool's films often opposed stereotypes and refused to focus on heterosexual relations, preferring individuality. She also taught film at Université du Québec à Montréal (UQAM).

== Early life ==
Pool was born in Soglio, Switzerland in 1950, and raised in Lausanne. Her father was a Polish-Jew who was stateless when he fled to Switzerland during World War II. Pool's Swiss mother is Catholic and she uses her mother's surname professionally. She immigrated to Canada in 1975 to study at the Université du Québec à Montréal from which she received a bachelor’s degree in communications in 1978; she later taught at her alma mater. She then directed a number of documentaries, short films, and feature films, as well as TV programs. Pool became a well-known filmmaker, director, producer, and screenwriter, who incorporated personal issues and curiosity around identity into films about exile, wandering, uprooting, states of mind and the quest for identity.

== Career ==
Pool is known as a feminist in film studies, producing films and videos that focus on female characters. Early in her career Pool drew inspiration from the works of author Marguerite Duras, focusing on themes of exclusion. Pool co-directed and edited Laurent Lamerre Portier in 1978. In 1980 she wrote, directed, and produced her first solo film, Strass Café, at the National Film Board of Canada. From 1980 to 1983, she directed 10 episodes of the show Planète for Radio-Québec (now called Télé-Québec) about cultural minorities. In the following year she directed Éva en transit, a show about the Franco-German singer Éva.

From 1978 to 1983, she taught classes about cinema and film at the Université du Québec à Montréal. In 1984 she wrote and directed her first fiction feature film, A Woman in Transit (La Femme de l’hôtel), which was received with enthusiasm by both critics and the general public. She then wrote and directed Anne Trister in 1986, the last installment in a triptych about the difficult quest for feminine identity, and the film was invited to fifteen international festivals.

In 1988, Pool’s film Straight for the Heart (À corps perdu), an adaptation of the novel Kurwenal by Yves Navarre, confirmed her importance to Quebec and Canadian cinematography. It received Premiere magazine’s first place prize at the Festival de la Francophonie de Namur and the Award of Excellence at the Atlantic Film Festival of Halifax.

Pool filmed her first feature-length documentary, Hotel Chronicles, in 1990 as part of the Office national du film’s series Parler d'Amérique. In 1991, she directed her fourth fiction feature film, The Savage Woman (La Demoiselle sauvage), co-written with Michel Langlois and Laurent Gagliardi, based on the story of Corinna Bille.

In 1992, she directed Rispondetemi, a segment of the film Montreal Stories (Montréal vu par...) by a collective of filmmakers including Patricia Rozema, Denys Arcand, Michel Brault, Atom Egoyan, and Jacques Leduc. From 1992 to 1993 she wrote and directed her fifth fiction feature film, Desire in Motion (Mouvements du désir), which was nominated in eight Genie Award categories including Best Direction and Best Screenwriting, and which was presented at the Sundance Film Festival in Utah.

In October 1994, the Festival de Blois (France) presented a retrospective of her cinematographic works, and the French Minister of Culture awarded her the title of Chevalier de l'ordre des Arts et des Lettres de France.

From 1994 to 1995, she directed two hour-long documentaries for TV as a part of a series of six bilingual episodes titled Femmes : Une histoire inédite, focusing on the emancipation of women. In 1996, she directed a short film entitled Lettre à ma fille for the Musée de la civilisation (Québec). In 1997 and 1998, she co-wrote and directed a documentary on the life and work of Canadian author Gabrielle Roy.

From 1998 to 1999, she and Nancy Huston co-wrote the film Set Me Free (Emporte-moi), which she also directed. It was her sixth fiction feature film, and it was selected for the opening of the Rendez-vous du Cinéma Québécois festival. It also won the Prize of the Ecumenical Jury at the Berlin International Film Festival.

Since 1989, she has received several tributes from around the world. The quality of her work has been recognized in Switzerland, France, Japan (Tokyo), Belgium, Sweden, Canada (Toronto), and the United States (Denver, etc.)

In 1993, she received the Prix d’Excellence Emergence from the Université du Québec à Montréal.

Pool directed her first feature film in English, Lost and Delirious, starring Piper Perabo, Jessica Paré, Mischa Barton, and Graham Greene, in 2000. It was a Quebec-Ontario co-production written by Judith Thompson and based on the novel The Wives of Bath by Susan Swan. In 2002, she directed the feature film The Blue Butterfly starring William Hurt and Pascale Bussières. It was a Quebec-England co-production written by Pete McCormack and based on the life of Georges Brossard. Following this, from 2004 to 2005, she hosted workshops for the Union des artistes on interpretation in front of the camera, and from 2004-2006, she taught film direction at Université du Québec à Montréal.

In 2006, she received three prizes for the entirety of her work. She was awarded the Prix Reconnaissance from the Université du Québec à Montréal, the Prix des Femmes de Mérite from the YWCA Foundation, and the Prix Albert-Tessier, the highest distinction awarded every year by the government of Quebec in recognition of exceptional talent and remarkable contributions to the cinematic field.

In 2007, she wrote and directed one of the documentaries in the series Hidden Lives, produced by the CBC (Canadian Broadcasting Company), aimed at discovering the hidden lives of people in her neighborhood. She also directed the fiction feature film Mommy Is at the Hairdresser's (Maman est chez le coiffeur), written by Isabelle Hébert. In 2008 and 2009, she directed The Last Escape (La Dernière Fugue), an adaptation of the novel Une belle mort (2005) by Gil Courtemanche.

From 2009 to 2011, she wrote and directed Pink Ribbons, Inc., a feature-length documentary for the NFB. In 2014, she and Marie Vien co-wrote the feature film The Passion of Augustine (La passion d’Augustine), which she also directed. It was a tremendous success when it came out in 2015, winning six prizes at the 18th Quebec Cinema Awards including best film, best director, best actress (Céline Bonnier), best supporting actress (Diane Lavallée), best costume design, and best hairstyling. Notably, Léa Pool was the first woman to win the prize for best film at this festival since its creation in 1999.

In 2016, she directed both a feature-length documentary entitled Double Peine and the feature film Worst Case, We Get Married (Et au pire on se mariera) based on the eponymous novel by Sophie Bienvenu who co-wrote the screenplay. This film was a Canadian/Swiss co-production, and it was released in 2017.

Throughout her career, Pool has participated as a member of the jury at international festivals in Chicago (United States), Locarno (Switzerland), and Taormina (Italy). In addition, she has won the Jutra Prize three times for the most successful films outside of Quebec - Set Me Free (Emporte-moi), Lost and Delirious, and Mommy Is at the Hairdresser’s (Maman est chez le coiffeur).

Along with her impressive career as a cinematographer, Pool has shared her knowledge through courses in screenwriting and directing at the Université du Québec à Montréal and at the Institut national de l'image et du son (INIS) in Montreal. She has been an instructor at intensive workshops in front of the camera for the Union des Artistes (UDA) since 2004 and helps with preparation for auditions. In addition, she taught a course in 2000 at the Centre des Arts de Banff entitled “Woman in a director’s chair.” In 2013, she received the title of Membre de l'Ordre du Canada, and in 2017, she was awarded the prestigious Prix Hommage de Ciné-Québec.

Pool adheres to the philosophy "that every film must have its own signature". In her successive productions, she challenges existing views on the role of filmmakers and the creative process. Most of her films that contribute to this idea reflect on woman's view of the female experience. She has been represented by the cultural Montreal agency Agence Goodwin since 2004.

== Personal life ==
Pool is a lesbian. She has a personal connection with her work, with many themes in her own life appearing in her films, including the exploration of identity and exile, as well as her Jewish heritage and her sexuality.

== Filmography ==
- Strass Cafè — 1980
- A Woman in Transit (La Femme de l'hôtel) — 1984
- Anne Trister — 1986
- Straight for the Heart (À corps perdu) — 1988
- Montreal Stories (Montréal vu par...) — 1991, segment "Rispondetemi"
- The Savage Woman (La Demoiselle sauvage) — 1991
- Desire in Motion (Mouvements du désir) — 1994
- Gabrielle Roy : L'auteure la plus célèbre du Québec — 1998
- Set Me Free (Emporte-moi) — 1999
- Lost and Delirious (Rebelles) — 2001
- The Blue Butterfly (Le Papillon bleu) — 2004
- Mommy Is at the Hairdresser's (Maman est chez le coiffeur) — 2008
- The Last Escape (La dernière fugue) — 2010
- Pink Ribbons, Inc. — 2011
- The Passion of Augustine (La Passion d'Augustine) — 2015
- Worst Case, We Get Married (Et au pire, on se mariera) — 2017
- Hotel Silence (Hôtel silence) — 2024
- We'll Find Happiness (On sera heureux) - 2025

== Awards and accolades ==
Léa Pool has won several awards, both from the press and the public. In 1984, La femme de l’hôtel was awarded the Best Canadian Feature Film at the Toronto International Film Festival. In 1986 she received the Audience Award for Anne Trister at the International Women's Film Festival in Créteil, and Best Feature Film at the Paris Lesbian and Feminist Film Festival, both in France. In addition, in 1988, Pool won three awards for À corps perdu, Emporte-moi, and the documentary on Gabrielle Roy. In 2001, Pool received the Jutra Award for Lost and Delirious. In 2006, Pool received the Prix Albert-Tessier. From 2002 to 2014, Pool won 14 awards and in 2017 accepted the Vancouver Women in Film and Television Artistic Merit Award at Vancouver International Film Festival.

In 2025 she was named by Québec Cinéma as the recipient of its annual Tribute Award at the 27th Quebec Cinema Awards.

== See also ==
- List of female film and television directors
- List of lesbian filmmakers
- List of LGBT-related films directed by women
