= Vincent and Me =

- Directed by: Michael Rubbo
- Written by: Michael Rubbo
- Produced by: Rock Demers; Claude Nedjar
- Starring: Nina Petronzio; Christopher Forrest; Paul Klerk; Alexandre Vernon Dobtcheff; Anna-Maria Giannotti; Andrée Pelletier; Jeanne Calment; Matthew Mabe; Tchéky Karyo
- Cinematography: Andreas Poulsson
- Music by: Pierick Houdy
- Production company: Les Productions La Fête
- Distributed by: Cinéma Plus Distribution
- Release date: 13 December 1990 (Canada)
- Running time: 100 mins
- Country: Canada
- Language: French

Vincent and Me (French-language title: Vincent et moi) is a 1990 French Canadian fantasy film. The movie was directed by Michael Rubbo and is the 11th in the Tales for All (Contes Pour Tous) series of children's movies created by Les Productions la Fête.

Jeanne Calment appeared as herself, aged 114, the oldest person to ever appear in a motion picture, a fact that gained her a placing in Guinness World Records. Calment claimed to have met Vincent van Gogh ca. 1888 when she was 12 or 13.

== Plot ==
Jo, a girl from Quebec, loves to draw, and she is good enough at it to win a scholarship. She goes to the city from her small town to study at a special art school, where more than anything else, she hopes to learn to paint like her hero, Vincent van Gogh. While sketching faces one day, she encounters a mysterious European art dealer who buys a few of her drawings, and commissions her to do some more. He rewards her handsomely for her work, and goes back to Amsterdam. Not long after, Jo is shown a magazine story about the "discovery" and million-dollar sale of some of the drawings of young Vincent van Gogh, drawings only she and her friend Felix know are hers. The only thing to do is for Jo and friends to get to Amsterdam and find the mystery man; or, better still, go right to the source and speak to Vincent himself in 19th-century Arles.

== Cast ==
- Nina Petronzio as Josephine "Jo" Tetley
- Christopher Forrest as Felix Murphy
- Paul Klerk as Joris
- Vernon Dobtcheff (billed as Alexandre Vernon Dobtchef) as Dr. Winkler
- Anna-Maria Giannotti as Grain
- Andrée Pelletier as Mrs. Wallis
- Matthew Mabe as Tom Mainfield
- Tchéky Karyo as Vincent van Gogh
- Maggie Castle as Crystal Tetley, Jo's Sister
- Jeanne Calment as Herself
- Kiki Classen
- Maria Giannotti
- Inge Ipenburg
- Michel Maillot
- Wally Martin
