= Saint-Joseph-de-la-Rive, Quebec =

Coordinates: 47.457149°N 70.367636°W

Saint-Joseph-de-la-Rive is an unincorporated community in Les Éboulements, Quebec, Canada. It is recognized as a designated place by Statistics Canada.

== Demographics ==
In the 2021 Census of Population conducted by Statistics Canada, Saint-Joseph-de-la-Rive had a population of 231 living in 104 of its 185 total private dwellings, a change of 22.2% from its 2016 population of 189. With a land area of 4.03 km^{2} (1.56 sq mi), it had a population density of 57.3/km^{2} (148.5/sq mi) in 2021.

== See also ==
- List of communities in Quebec
- List of designated places in Quebec
