= Attila Bertalan =

Canadian actor and filmmaker

- Education: University of British Columbia
- Occupations: film director, actor, screenwriter
- Known for: A Bullet in the Head

Attila Bertalan is a Canadian actor and filmmaker. He is most noted for his 1990 film A Bullet in the Head, which was selected as Canada's submission for the Academy Award for Best Foreign Language Film in 1991.

Originally from British Columbia, Bertalan was twice honoured by the Canadian Student Film Festival while he was a film student at the University of British Columbia, receiving an honourable mention in 1982 for The Glass Door and winning Best Director and Best Fiction Film in 1984 for The Roomer. Later based in Montreal, he acted in several films, including Bashar Shbib's Seductio, Clair Obscur and 15 Ugly Sisters, while making A Bullet in the Head. The film, a war allegory about an injured soldier's struggle to survive in unfamiliar territory, was spoken entirely in an invented language.

In 1992, A Bullet in the Head was screened by the Museum of Modern Art in New York City as part of a Canadian film series that also included Léa Pool's The Savage Woman (La Demoiselle sauvage) and André Forcier's An Imaginary Tale (Une histoire inventée).

Bertalan's second film, Between the Moon and Montevideo, was released in 2000. A science fiction film set on a space station, the film starred Bertalan, Gerard Gagnon and Pascale Bussières.
