= Seductio =

- Directed by: Bashar Shbib
- Written by: Bashar Shbib
- Produced by: Bashar Shbib
- Starring: Attila Bertalan; Kathy Horner
- Cinematography: Michel Lamothe
- Edited by: Florence Moureaux; Bashar Shbib; Amy Webb; David Wellington
- Music by: Betty Doroschuk; Erika Hagenlocher; Michel Oicle
- Release date: August 29, 1987 (MWFF)
- Running time: 87 min
- Country: Canada
- Language: English

Seductio is a 1987 Canadian film written, produced, and directed by Bashar Shbib. The film stars Attila Bertalan and Kathy Horner as Mikael and Melanie, a couple who are lost in the woods when their vehicle breaks down while travelling; Melanie is consumed by a fear of being attacked by bears, while Mikael tries to stoke her fears as a psychological game.

== Distribution ==
The film premiered in the Panorama Canada stream at the Montreal World Film Festival on August 29, 1987. It later faced some controversy when the Rendez-vous Québec Cinéma initially refused to screen the film in its original form at its 1988 festival; Chbib attempted to blockade the venue in protest. When the film screened at the 1987 Toronto International Film Festival, Chbib also stripped in public to protest the lack of funding available to independent filmmakers.

== Critical response ==
The film was poorly received by critics. Jay Scott of The Globe and Mail opined that the film had been programmed by TIFF solely "to remind viewers how bad Canadian movies once were", and concluded that "you can escape the theatre, but you can't collect on the debt Seductio owes you for wasted time". John Harkness of Now wrote that publicist Daphna Kastner deserved an award for having to promote the film, and felt personally compelled to ask festival programmer Kay Armatage why the festival even programmed Chbib's films at all.
