= He Knows You're Alone =

1980 film by Armand Mastroianni

- Original theatrical poster
- Directed by: Armand Mastroianni
- Written by: Scott Parker
- Produced by: Robert Di Milia; George Manasse; Nan Perlman
- Starring: Caitlin O'Heaney; Don Scardino; Elizabeth Kemp; Tom Rolfing
- Cinematography: Gerald Feil
- Edited by: George Norris
- Music by: Alexander Peskanov; Mark Peskanov
- Distributed by: Metro-Goldwyn-Mayer; United Artists
- Release date: August 29, 1980
- Running time: 94 minutes
- Country: United States
- Language: English
- Budget: $300,000
- Box office: $4.9 million

He Knows You're Alone is a 1980 American slasher film directed by Armand Mastroianni, written by Scott Parker and starring Caitlin O'Heaney, Don Scardino, Elizabeth Kemp, Tom Rolfing, and Tom Hanks in his film debut. The plot follows a woman who is stalked by a killer targeting soon-to-be brides the weekend before her wedding.

Independently made by several producers, including Edgar Lansbury, He Knows You're Alone was shot on location in Mastroianni's native Staten Island, New York in December 1979 under the working title Blood Wedding. The film was subsequently sold to Metro-Goldwyn Mayer, who retitled it and released it with United Artists on August 29, 1980. Although the film received mixed reviews, it was a commercial success for MGM, grossing nearly $5 million at the U.S. box office.

He Knows You're Alone has been credited for being one of the first horror films inspired by the success of Halloween, and shares a number of similarities with that previous hit. In the years since its release, it has received some retrospective praise from genre film critics. Film critic Robin Wood noted the film among its peers as a "highly sophisticated attempt" at analyzing violence against women.

== Plot ==
A young bride is murdered on her wedding day by the man she rejected for her current fiancé, Len Gamble, a detective. Several years later on Long Island, a young bride-to-be named Marie is stabbed to death in a movie theater while her friend Ruthie sits beside her. The killer, Ray Carlton, disappears into the night.

The next morning, Ray arrives on Staten Island, where he observes university student Amy Jensen from a distance. Amy is preparing for her wedding. She, her fiancé, Phil, and his friends on their way out of town prepare for a bachelor party before the wedding. After attending a ballet class with her friends, Nancy and Joyce, the three run into their philosophy professor Carl, with whom Joyce is having an affair. Amy leaves to go to a dress fitting, stopping to get ice cream on the way, where she notices a man following her. Outside the ice-cream shop, she is startled by Marvin, her ex-boyfriend, who is on a break from his job at the local morgue.

Amy stops by the local dress shop for her fitting. Unbeknownst to her, as she leaves, the dressmaker is stabbed to death by Ray with a pair of scissors. Later that night, Nancy and Joyce surprise Amy at her home with a small bachelorette party. Her parents, gone for the weekend, leave Amy in charge of her kid sister, Diane. Joyce leaves the party for Carl's house, where the two begin to have sex, until the power inexplicably goes out. Carl checks on the electrical box. When he returns, he is stabbed to death by the killer with a kitchen knife after finding Joyce's lifeless body in the bed.

The following morning, Marvin arrives at Amy's house and insinuates that he wants to rekindle their relationship, and Amy expresses second thoughts over her marriage to Phil. While in the kitchen, Amy sees the mysterious man standing in her yard and becomes frightened. She invites Marvin to come to a local amusement park with her, Nancy and Diane, but he declines because he has a shift at the morgue that night.

Meanwhile, the police find the dressmaker's body at the shop. Detectives Frank Daley and Len Gamble arrive to investigate. Later, Amy and Nancy meet a student named Elliot while jogging through a forest trail. They attend the amusement park with him, where he questions Amy's claims of a man following her. While riding a dark ride with her sister, Amy sees Ray inside the ride, and confides in Nancy at her house that night. Amy briefly leaves to take her sister to a birthday party, leaving Nancy alone at the house. After taking a shower, Nancy puts on a record and lies down in the living room to smoke a joint. Moments later, her throat is slashed by Ray.

Amy returns and is attacked by Ray after discovering Nancy's severed head in the fish tank. She rushes to her car and struggles to drive with Ray on the roof. She crashes the car in a wooded area and runs to the nearby morgue, where she finds Marvin and phones the police. Ray enters the morgue, and Detective Gamble arrives as well. Ray chases Amy through a tunnel system in the morgue's basement. When confronted by Detective Gamble, Ray stabs him in the heart after he gets shot in his left shoulder. Nevertheless, Ray continues to pursue Amy. Amy manages to trap the wounded Ray inside a storage closet and escapes from the basement with Marvin. The two flee outside as the police arrive and enter the morgue.

Marvin and Amy are to be married, implying that she cut off her marriage to Phil. As Amy sits in front of a mirror in her wedding dress, an unseen person enters the room. She stands, approaches the individual and says, "Phil, what are you doing here?", before screaming in horror.

== Cast ==
- Don Scardino as Marvin Travis
- Caitlin O'Heaney as Amy Jensen
- Elizabeth Kemp as Nancy
- Tom Rolfing as Ray Carlton
- Lewis Arlt as Detective Len Gamble
- Patsy Pease as Joyce
- James Rebhorn as Professor Carl Mason
- Dana Barron as Diane Jensen
- Tom Hanks as Elliot
- Paul Gleason as Detective Frank Daley
- James Carroll as Phil
- Russell Todd as Don

== Analysis ==
Film scholar John Kenneth Muir notes in his book, Horror Films of the 1980s, that, like other slasher films of the period, He Knows You're Alone is structured around an organizing principle, this being a wedding. In this instance, the film follows a format in which the narrative occurs during either a holiday or other important date. Whereas other contemporaneous slasher films, such as Friday the 13th, utilize the summer camp setting as an organizing principle and locale, He Knows You're Alone takes place in various wedding-specific locations, such as a dressmaker's shop, a church, and the bride's home.

Critic Robin Wood wrote in American Horrors: Essays on the Modern American Horror Film that the film "makes a highly sophisticated attempt... to analyze violence against women in terms of male possessiveness and the fear of female autonomy."

== Production ==
=== Development ===
The concept for He Knows You're Alone was developed in 1979, after director Armand Mastroianni pitched an idea to producer Edgar Lansbury for a horror film based on the urban legend of "The Hook", in which a young couple in a parked car are attacked by a murderer. When Mastroianni realized during the middle of the pitch that Lansbury had little interest in the project, he spontaneously suggested that the aforementioned plot be a self-referential film within a film. The idea piqued Lansbury's interest, after which Mastroianni commissioned playwright Scott Parker to write a screenplay for a slasher film that began with an opening sequence in which two characters watch a horror film in a movie theater, during which one of them is murdered by a serial killer. The film was written under several working titles, including Shriek, The Uninvited, and Blood Wedding.

=== Casting ===
Caitlin O'Heaney auditioned for the role of Amy Jensen, and despite disliking horror films, agreed to take the part in order to gain entry into the Screen Actors Guild. She had previously appeared in a supporting role in the slasher film Savage Weekend (1979). Mastroianni interviewed approximately 100 actresses before choosing O'Heaney for the role.

The film marked the first film appearance of actor Tom Hanks, who played a relatively small part. In fact, it was said that Hanks's character was originally written to be killed off with Nancy's character, but because the filmmakers liked him so much, they omitted filming his death scene for the film.

=== Filming ===
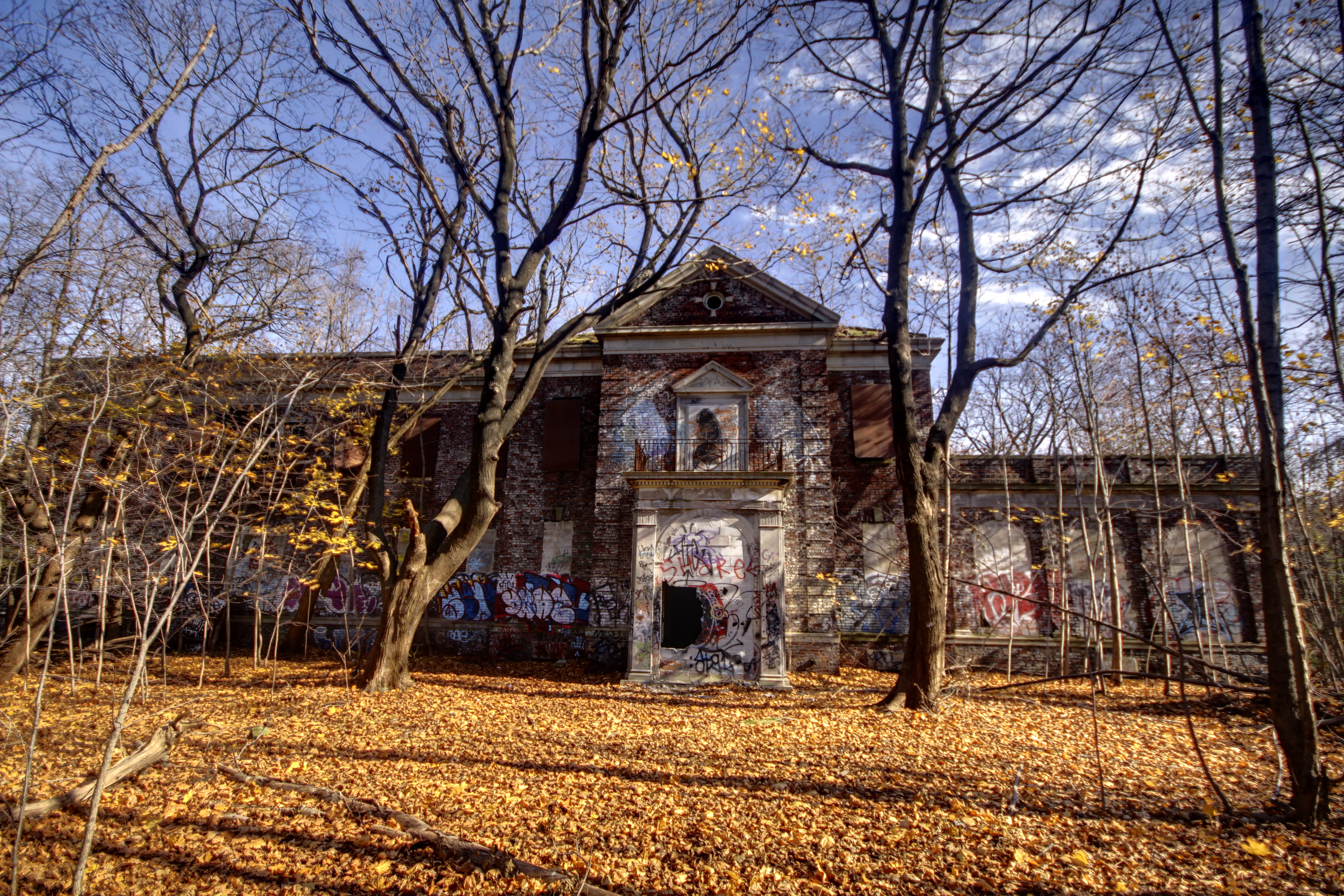
The film's climactic sequence was shot at the abandoned Seaview Hospital on Staten Island.

Principal photography was originally intended to take place in Houston, Texas, under executive producer Samuel Z. Arkoff (who had been an executive producer for other MGM releases, including The Amityville Horror the previous year), on a budget of $600,000. When Arkoff was unable to finance the film, production proceeded on a budget of approximately $300,000, with filming taking place entirely in Mastroianni's native Staten Island. Most of the film was shot in Staten Island's New Dorp neighborhood. Three private residences were used as shooting locations in the Stapleton and Graniteville neighborhoods. The film's climax was shot at Staten Island's historic Seaview Hospital, including the underground tunnel system beneath the structure that was used to remove dead bodies of tuberculosis patients in the 19th century. Additional filming locations included Staten Island's High Rock Park, the South Beach Amusement Park, and the Church of Our Lady Queen of Peace. The film's opening sequence in the movie theater was shot inside the then-dilapidated St. George Theatre, while the Fox Theatre served as the exterior.

The film was shot on 35mm over a period of approximately eighteen to twenty-four days in December 1979, with the shoot completing days before Christmas 1979.

==== Direction ====
According to director Mastroianni, the entire production from script to final edit took only six months to complete. The shoot was fast-paced for and demanding on both the cast and crew, who had to relocate between various locations on a daily basis to shoot the entire script. O'Heaney recalled that the majority of the film was shot in single takes.

Commenting on the film's tone, Mastroianni said: "I want critics to see it for what it is. It's made to be a terror-filled rollercoaster ride. It's an escapist film." Mastroianni also commented that he "fought against [showing] blood," opting to keep the on-screen violence to a minimum and instead ratchet the tension.

=== Music ===
The original music score was composed by Alexander and Mark Peskanov.

== Release ==
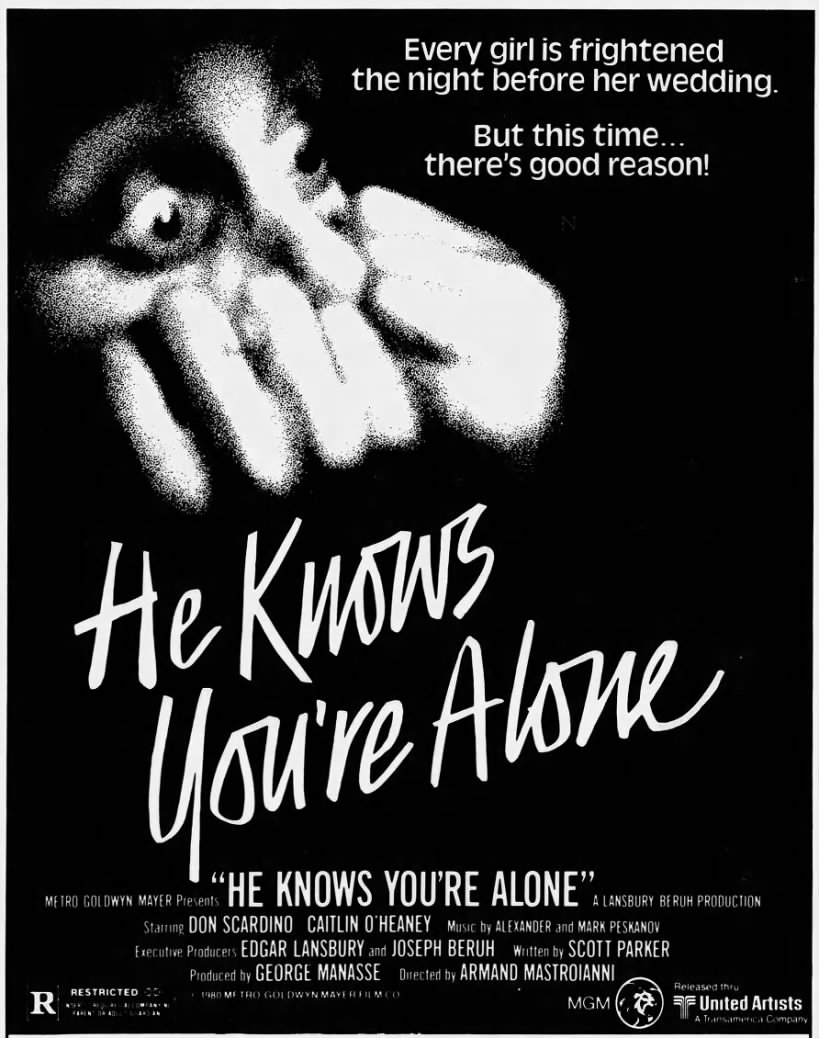
Newspaper advertisement in the Los Angeles Times

Although independently produced, He Knows You're Alone was acquired by Metro-Goldwyn-Mayer and released through United Artists. Executive producer Joseph Beruh sold the film to the studio after taking it to Los Angeles and screening it for potential distributors, one of which was 20th Century-Fox. To promote the film, MGM devised a theatrical trailer that featured footage of actress Caitlin O'Heaney applying makeup in front of a mirror, during which a hand breaks through the glass and grabs her. This footage does not appear in the film, and was shot on soundstages in Los Angeles after principal photography had completed.

He Knows You're Alone had its world premiere on August 29, 1980, (Note: The internet review aggregator Rotten Tomatoes erroneously lists the film's release date as December 31, 1980, which contradicts its entry with the American Film Institute catalog, which cites the film's Los Angeles opening as August 29, and its New York opening September 26; the latter coincides with Tom Buckley's review of the film in The New York Times, which is dated September 26, 1980.) opening in 279 theaters in California. The film had its east coast premiere the following month on September 26, showing at several cinemas in the New York City metropolitan area. By November 1980, its theatrical release had expanded to 1,200 theaters.

=== Home media ===
MGM Home Entertainment first released He Knows You're Alone on VHS and Betamax in 1983. It was also released on CED video disc by MGM the same year. MGM reissued a VHS edition of the film in 1991.

Warner Bros. Home Entertainment released the film on DVD October 5, 2004. On May 18, 2021, Scream Factory released the film on Blu-ray with a new 2K scan from the original interpositive, along with several new interviews with cast and crew members.

== Reception ==
=== Box office ===
The film earned $748,824 during its August 29, 1980 debut weekend in the United States across 279 theaters, opening at number two at the United States box office. The film remained in release for seventeen weeks in the United States, and was a box-office hit for Metro-Goldwyn-Mayer and United Artists, grossing $4,875,436.

=== Critical response ===
He Knows You're Alone received mixed reviews from critics. On the review aggregator website Rotten Tomatoes, 36% of 11 critics' reviews are positive, with an average rating of 5.3/10. Metacritic, which uses a weighted average, assigned the film a score of 41 out of 100, based on 6 critics, indicating "mixed or average" reviews.

Tom Buckley of The New York Times criticized the film for "uncertain pacing, halting performances and innumerable technical flaws", while praising the performance of male lead Don Scardino. The Boston Globe's Michael Blowen faulted the film's script and direction as "slow and strictly second rate", adding "the production values are only slightly better than those in my uncle's home movies". Kevin Thomas of the Los Angeles Times deemed the film a "standard grisly rampaging killer fare... there are the usual bows to Hitchcock... but He Knows You're Alone is really no more than just another by-the-numbers piece of sickening trash".

In their October 23, 1980, edition of Sneak Previews, critics Gene Siskel and Roger Ebert lambasted the film as "gruesome and despicable", likening it to similar slasher films, such as Friday the 13th, Prom Night and Terror Train, all released the same year.

Jack Mathews of the Detroit Free Press wrote, "Rarely has a horror movie worked so hard for so little. There are so many cinematic shock tactics employed—tacky eerie music announcing the killer's presence, shadowy forms in the foreground and background, slamming doors, blown light fuses, hands on shoulders etc.—that you're numb by the sixth killing." Jimmy Summers of BoxOffice magazine gave the film a negative review, noting, "He Knows You're Alone is another one of those low-budget thrillers that should carry in the credits line: "Based on characters and ideas developed by John Carpenter." Additionally, Summers noted the lack of on-screen violence as leaving the "more blood-thirsty horror fans feeling cheated". John Dodd of the Edmonton Journal similarly deemed the film "unoriginal and unnecessary", and a "bloody, boring walk down the aisle".

John Herzfeld of The Courier-Journal, however, praised the film's opening film-within-a-film sequence as a "wry twist", concluding, "Despite the incompetent script and some irregular pacing, He Knows You're Alone does deliver a few surprises and some suspense".

== Legacy ==
The film's opening sequence, featuring a character being murdered in a movie theater auditorium while watching a slasher film, was repeated in Wes Craven's 1997 film, Scream 2.

In a 2023 retrospective on the film for /Film, Anthony Crislip noted it as "an underrated slasher" despite its similarities to its contemporaries, and praised its finale as director Mastroianni's "finest work in the film" due to its use of narrow corridors and dim lighting. Nathaniel Thompson of Turner Classic Movies noted a favorable retrospective assessment of the film, writing, "time has proven the [slasher] subgenre to have an enduring appeal that's easily survived the slings and arrows of its attackers, with this one holding a particular fascination as an early and quirky offering at the dawn of the big studio slasher boom."

== Sources ==
- Everman, Welch D. (1993). Cult Horror Films: From Attack of the 50 Foot Woman to Zombies of Mora Tau. New York City, New York: Citadel Press. ISBN 978-0-8065-1425-3.
- Horvitz, Leslie (November 1980). "He Knows You're Alone". Fangoria. Vol. 1, no. 9. pp. 29–31, 56–57. ISSN 0164-2111. Archived from the original on May 31, 2023.
- Kerswell, Justin (September 29, 2013). "He Knows You're Alone (1980)". The Hysteria Continues (Podcast). Archived from the original on January 31, 2025 – via Podbay.
- Muir, John Kenneth (2012). The Films of John Carpenter. Jefferson, North Carolina: McFarland & Company. ISBN 978-0-7864-9348-7.
- Muir, John Kenneth (2010). Horror Films of the 1980s. Jefferson, North Carolina: McFarland & Company. ISBN 978-0-786-45501-0.
- Norman, Jason (2014). Welcome to Our Nightmares: Behind the Scene with Today's Horror Actors. Jefferson, North Carolina: McFarland & Company. ISBN 978-1-476-61724-4.
- Nowell, Richard (2010). Blood Money: A History of the First Teen Slasher Film Cycle. New York City, New York: Bloomsbury Publishing. ISBN 978-1-441-18850-2.
- Ocker, J. W. (2012). The New York Grimpendium: A Guide to Macabre and Ghastly Sites in New York State. Woodstock, Vermont: The Countryman Press. ISBN 978-0-881-50990-8.
- Rockoff, Adam (2016) [2002]. Going to Pieces: The Rise and Fall of the Slasher Film, 1978-1986. Jefferson, North Carolina: McFarland & Company. ISBN 978-0-7864-9192-6.
- Wood, Robin (1987). "Returning the Look: Eyes of a Stranger". In Waller, Gregory (ed.). American Horrors: Essays on the Modern American Horror Film. Urbana, Illinois: University of Illinois Press. pp. 79–85. ISBN 978-0-252-01448-2.
