= Eating (film) =

1990 film directed by Henry Jaglom

- Directed by: Henry Jaglom
- Written by: Henry Jaglom
- Produced by: Judith Wolinsky
- Starring: Nelly Alard; Lisa Richards; Frances Bergen; Mary Crosby; Gwen Welles; Elizabeth Kemp; Marina Gregory
- Cinematography: Hanania Baer
- Edited by: Michelle Hart
- Distributed by: International Rainbow
- Release date: November 30, 1990
- Running time: 110 minutes
- Country: United States
- Language: English

Eating is a 1990 American comedy drama film starring Nelly Alard, Lisa Blake Richards, Frances Bergen, Mary Crosby, Gwen Welles, Elizabeth Kemp, and Marina Gregory. It is written and directed by Henry Jaglom.

== Plot ==
Featuring an all-female cast, the film is set entirely inside and around a spacious house in Los Angeles. Helene is a woman turning 40 years old and her friends—who include French filmmaker Martine, house guest Sophie, and Lydia—throw her a party. But also there is Kate, a friend turning 30, and Sadie, a Hollywood film agent turning 50. So, all of Helene's, Kate's, and Sadie's friends arrive for the triple-birthday party where Martine films the events with her movie camera, as well as filming the shocking secrets revealed by Helene's mother Whitney and younger sister Nancy who confide in their interviews about their obsession with food and their roles in life.

== Cast ==
- Nelly Alard as Martine
- Lisa Blake Richards as Helene (credited as Lisa Richards)
- Frances Bergen as Whitney
- Mary Crosby as Kate
- Gwen Welles as Sophie
- Elizabeth Kemp as Nancy
- Marina Gregory as Lydia
- Daphna Kastner as Jennifer
- Marlena Giovi as Sadie
- Beth Grant as Carla
- Taryn Power as Anita
- Catherine Genender as Lily
- Hildy Brooks as Mary
- Jackie O'Brien as Janet (credited as Jacqueline Woolsey)
- Sherry Boucher as Maria (credited as Sherry Boucher-Lytle)
- Savannah Smith Boucher as Eloise
- Aloma Ichinose as Joanna
- Toni Basil as Jackie

== Reception ==
=== Critical response ===
Kevin Thomas of the Los Angeles Times wrote: "Mary Crosby reveals depths heretofore unsuspected, and from Gwen Welles, one of his regulars, he elicits her most harrowing, complex performance yet. But if Eating had accomplished nothing else, it would have been remarkable for the performance of Frances Bergen, one of Hollywood’s enduring, elegant beauties, in what is surely the best part of her career."

Roger Ebert of The Chicago Sun Times wrote: "This is a message that needs to be shared, but the problem with Eating is that it shares it over and over again, until we wonder why Mrs. Williams doesn’t beg her younger friends to talk about sex, or alimony, or a good book they’ve read lately. The movie makes its point early and often: That its characters are hung up on food, and eat for unhealthy and obsessive reasons. It’s true. We know it’s true. We wait in vain for additional insights."

Rita Kempley of The Washington Post wrote: "Eating is not rated but is suitable for general audiences."
