= 1987 Toronto International Film Festival =

Annual Canadian film festival

- Festival poster
- Opening film: I've Heard the Mermaids Singing
- Location: Toronto, Ontario, Canada
- Hosted by: Toronto International Film Festival Group
- Festival date: September 10, 1987–September 19, 1987
- Language: English
- Website: tiff.net
- 1988 1986

The 12th Toronto International Film Festival (TIFF) took place in Toronto, Ontario, Canada between September 10 and September 19, 1987. I've Heard the Mermaids Singing by Patricia Rozema was selected as the opening film.

The Princess Bride by Rob Reiner won the People's Choice Award at the festival. André the Giant, one of the stars of the film, sat on a girth constructed especially for him during the premiere of the film at the festival.

The festival featured a retrospective of seven films by Pedro Almodóvar.

== Awards ==
| Award | Film | Director |
|---|---|---|
| People's Choice Award | The Princess Bride | Rob Reiner |
| Best Canadian Feature Film | Family Viewing | Atom Egoyan |
| Best Canadian Feature Film - Special Jury Citation | Artist on Fire | Kay Armatage |
| International Critics' Award | Night Zoo | Jean-Claude Lauzon |

== Programme ==
=== Galas ===
- Aria by Robert Altman, Bruce Beresford, Bill Bryden, Jean-Luc Godard, Derek Jarman, Franc Roddam, Nicolas Roeg, Ken Russell, Charles Sturridge and Julien Temple
- Boyfriends and Girlfriends by Eric Rohmer
- Dark Eyes by Nikita Mikhalkov
- The Glass Menagerie by Paul Newman
- I've Heard the Mermaids Singing by Patricia Rozema
- Night Zoo by Jean-Claude Lauzon
- Orphans by Alan J. Pakula
- The Princess Bride by Rob Reiner
- Sammy and Rosie Get Laid by Stephen Frears
- Too Outrageous! by Richard Benner

=== Special Presentations ===
- Baby Boom by Charles Shyer
- Hail! Hail! Rock 'n' Roll by Taylor Hackford
- Sister, Sister by Bill Condon
- The Thief of Baghdad by Raoul Walsh

=== Contemporary World Cinema ===
- Babette's Feast by Gabriel Axel
- Barfly by Barbet Schroeder
- The Belly of an Architect by Peter Greenaway
- Big Shots by Robert Mandel
- Comrades by Bill Douglas
- A Death in the Family by Stewart Main and Peter Wells
- Diary for My Lovers by Márta Mészáros
- Dudes by Penelope Spheeris
- Dust in the Wind by Hou Hsiao-hsien
- Field of Honor by Jean-Pierre Denis
- Five Corners by Tony Bill
- A Flame in My Heart by Alain Tanner
- Gaby: A True Story by Luis Mandoki
- Good Morning, Babylon by Paolo Taviani and Vittorio Taviani
- Half of Heaven by Manuel Gutiérrez Aragón
- Jean de Florette by Claude Berri
- Julia and Julia by Peter Del Monte
- Keep Your Right Up by Jean-Luc Godard
- King Lear by Jean-Luc Godard
- Magdalena Viraga by Nina Menkes
- Matewan by John Sayles
- Maurice by James Ivory
- Mauvais Sang by Leos Carax
- Near Dark by Kathryn Bigelow
- Night of the Pencils by Héctor Olivera
- Paradise by Doris Dörrie
- Personal Services by Terry Jones
- A Prayer for the Dying by Mike Hodges
- Repentance by Tengiz Abuladze
- Slam Dance by Wayne Wang
- Sorceress by Suzanne Schiffman
- South of Reno by Mark Rezyka
- A Successful Man by Humberto Solás
- A Taxing Woman by Juzo Itami
- The Theme by Gleb Panfilov
- Tough Guys Don't Dance by Norman Mailer
- Travelling avant by Jean-Charles Tacchella
- Under the Sun of Satan by Maurice Pialat
- Wish You Were Here by David Leland

=== Perspectives Canada ===
- And Then You Die by Francis Mankiewicz
- Candy Mountain by Robert Frank and Rudy Wurlitzer
- The Climb by Donald Shebib
- The Critical Years by Gerald L'Ecuyer
- Deaf to the City (Le Sourd dans la ville) by Mireille Dansereau
- Eva: Guerrillera by Jacqueline Levitin
- Family Viewing by Atom Egoyan
- In the Shadow of the Wind (Les Fous de Bassan) by Yves Simoneau
- Juju Music by Jacques Holender
- The Last Straw by Giles Walker
- Life Classes by William D. MacGillivray
- Le Lys cassé by André Melançon
- The Secret by Leuten Rojas
- Seductio by Bashar Shbib
- So Many Miracles by Saul Rubinek
- Taking Care by Clarke Mackey
- To Hurt and to Heal by Laura Sky
- Train of Dreams by John N. Smith
- Too Outrageous! by Richard Benner
- Undivided Attention by Chris Gallagher
- A Winter Tan by Jackie Burroughs, Louise Clark, John Frizzell, John Walker and Aerlyn Weissman
- World Dreams by Niv Fichman

=== Documentaries ===
- Aqabat-Jaber, Passing Through by Eyal Sivan
- Artist on Fire by Kay Armatage
- Broken Noses by Bruce Weber
- Call Me Madame by Françoise Romand
- Chuck Solomon: Coming of Age by Marc Huestis
- Dancing Around the Table by Maurice Bulbulian
- Distant Harmony by Dewitt L. Sage
- The Finest Kind by Mary Jane Gomes
- From the Pole to the Equator by Yervant Gianikian
- Gap-Toothed Women by Les Blank
- Greenham Granny by Caroline Goldie
- Handsworth Songs by John Akomfrah
- The Houses Are Full of Smoke by Allan Francovich
- Huey Lewis and the News: Be-Fore! by Les Blank
- In the Name of God by Patricio Guzmán
- International Sweethearts of Rhythm by Greta Schiller
- It Is Not Easy to be Young by Y. Podnieks
- Joe Polowsky: An American Dreamer by Wolfgang Pfeiffer
- Resan by Peter Watkins
- Kamikaze Hearts by Juliet Bashore
- Landslides by Sarah Gibson
- Poundmaker's Lodge by Alanis Obomsawin
- Robert Wilson and the Civil Wars by Howard Brookner
- Those Roos Boys and Friends by Barbara Boyden
- Signed, Lino Brocka by Christian Blackwood
- Vincent by Paul Cox
- Weapons of the Spirit by Pierre Sauvage
- Where Is Here? by Sturla Gunnarsson
- Wild Flowers: Women of South Lebanon by Mai Masri
- Ziveli: Medicine for the Heart by Les Blank
- The Zoo by Kevin McMahon

=== Buried Treasures ===
- Alone Across the Pacific by Kon Ichikawa (1963)
- The Girl Friends by Michelangelo Antonioni (1955)
- Hullabaloo Over Georgie and Bonnie's Pictures by James Ivory (1979)
- Kanchenjunga by Satyajit Ray (1962)
- King Lear by Grigori Kozintsev (1971)
- A New Leaf by Elaine May (1971)
- Rendezvous at Bray by André Delvaux (1971)
- The Spy in Black by Michael Powell (1939)
- Went the Day Well? by Alberto Cavalcanti (1942)
