= Ride Me =

Ride Me may refer to:

- Ride Me (album), a 2014 album
- Ride Me (film), a 1994 film
