= Clark Gregg =

American actor, director, and screenwriter (born 1962)

- Gregg in 2026
- Born: Robert Clark Gregg Jr. April 2, 1962 (age 64); Boston, Massachusetts, U.S.
- Education: New York University (BFA)
- Occupations: Actor; director; screenwriter
- Years active: 1988–present
- Spouse: Jennifer Grey (m. 2001; div. 2021)
- Children: 1

Robert Clark Gregg Jr. (born April 2, 1962) is an American actor, director, and screenwriter. He portrayed Phil Coulson in films and television series set in the Marvel Cinematic Universe from 2008 to 2024, and voiced Coulson in an animated television series and video games.

Gregg played the role of FBI Special Agent Mike Casper on the NBC political drama series The West Wing (2001–2004) and as Richard, the ex-husband of Christine Campbell, in the CBS sitcom The New Adventures of Old Christine (2006–2010).

He wrote the horror film What Lies Beneath (2000), and wrote and directed the black comedy Choke (2008) and the comedy-drama Trust Me (2013). He appeared in the films The Adventures of Sebastian Cole (1998), One Hour Photo (2002), We Were Soldiers (2002), In Good Company (2004), When a Stranger Calls (2006), 500 Days of Summer (2009), Much Ado About Nothing (2012), The To Do List (2013), Labor Day (2013), Live by Night (2016) and Being the Ricardos (2021).

== Early life ==
Gregg was born April 2, 1962, in Boston, Massachusetts, the son of Mary Layne (née Shine) and Robert Clark Gregg Sr., an Episcopal priest and Stanford University professor. His family relocated frequently and he had lived in seven cities by the time he was 17. He attended high school in Chapel Hill, North Carolina, where his father was a professor at nearby Duke University.

He attended Ohio Wesleyan University for two years before dropping out and moving to Manhattan. He worked various jobs, such as being a bar back, a security guard at the Guggenheim Museum, and a parking valet at a restaurant. He enrolled at New York University's Tisch School of the Arts, where he studied drama and English, and graduated in 1986.

== Career ==
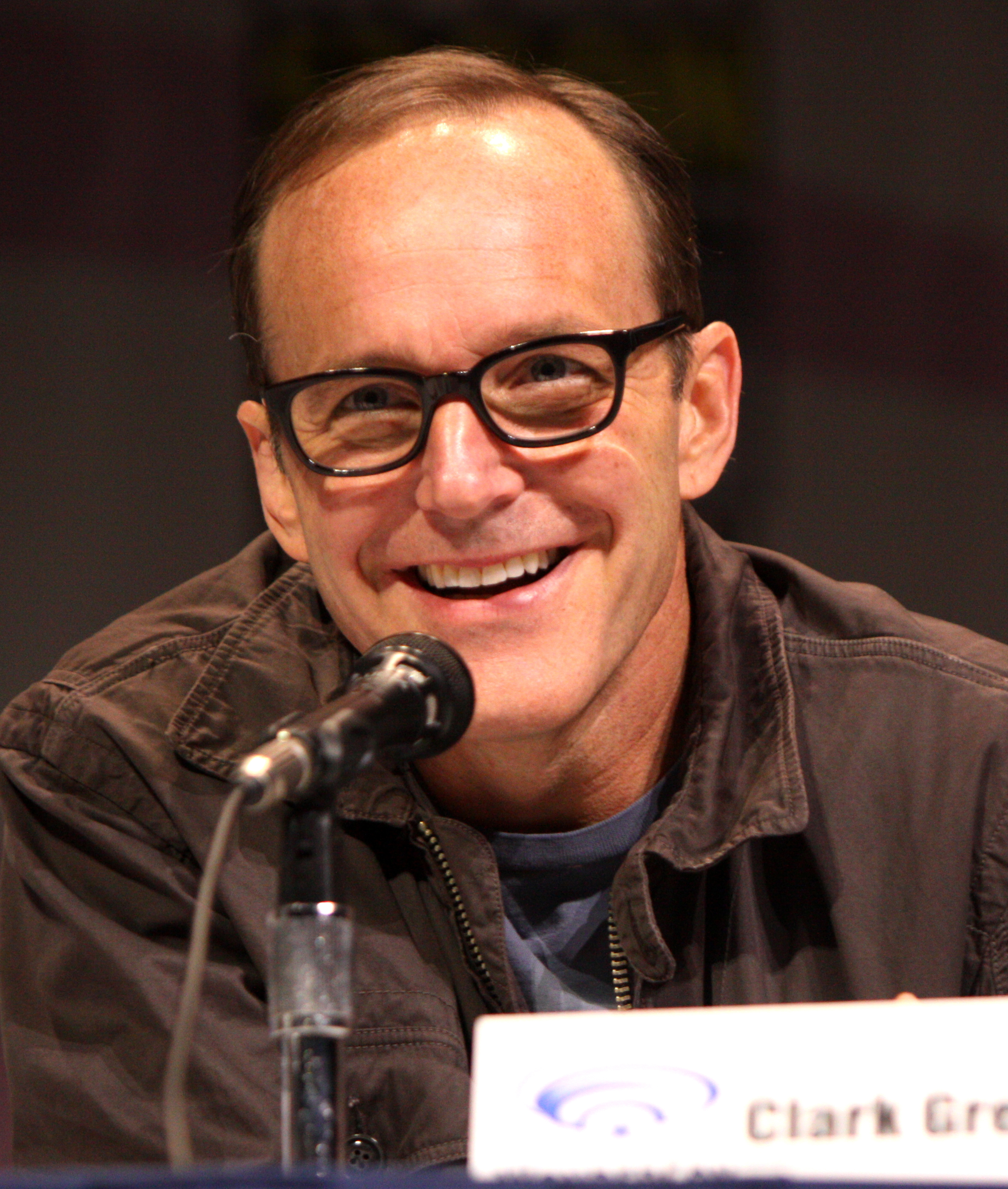
Gregg at the 2013 WonderCon

Gregg was a founding member, and later artistic director, of the off-Broadway Atlantic Theater Company, which formed in 1983. Gregg has been featured in a number of supporting roles in films, such as Lovely & Amazing, The Human Stain, and In Good Company, and a number of guest spots on TV series, such as Will & Grace, Sports Night, Sex and the City and The West Wing. He wrote the screenplay for the 2000 thriller What Lies Beneath.

He is the director and screenwriter of the 2008 film Choke, based on the Chuck Palahniuk novel of the same name, starring Sam Rockwell. Gregg consulted his father, a retired religion professor at Stanford, for the quotation from Saint Paul's letter to the Galatians which Gregg used in Choke. Gregg's father is the former chaplain at Stanford Memorial Church.

In 2008, Gregg appeared in the film Iron Man as S.H.I.E.L.D. agent Phil Coulson. In 2010, he reprised his role as Agent Coulson for Iron Man 2. Gregg had since signed up for a multiple film deal as the character with Marvel Studios. In 2011, he returned again as Coulson for Thor. Gregg noted his being a part of the expanding Marvel Cinematic Universe as being very exciting; "Agent Coulson was one of the guys who wasn't really in the comic books, and he was a very kind of small role in Iron Man," he said, "and I was just very lucky that they chose to expand that character and chose to put him more into the universe of it. It's really a blast!" Following on from his appearance in Thor, he again reprised his role in The Avengers. Gregg stars in a series of short films, Marvel One-Shots, that center around his character and can be seen on the Blu-ray releases of the films.

In October 2010, Gregg was part of the cast of a staged reading of Larry Kramer's The Normal Heart alongside Dylan Walsh, Lisa Kudrow, and Tate Donovan, presented in Los Angeles on the occasion of the play's 25th anniversary (and preceding the play's 2011 Broadway premiere, which retained elements of this staged reading); the reading was directed by his then-father-in-law, Joel Grey.

From 2013 to 2020, Gregg portrayed Agent Phil Coulson in the ABC television superhero drama series Agents of S.H.I.E.L.D., set within the MCU, alongside Ming-Na Wen and Chloe Bennet. He directed episodes in seasons five and six.

On April 20, 2013, Trust Me, a film written, produced, and directed by Gregg, premiered at the Tribeca Film Festival. The film found limited release in the United States in June 2014.

Gregg reprised his role as Agent Coulson in the 2019 superhero film Captain Marvel and the animated series What If...?, episodes "What If... the World Lost Its Mightiest Heroes?" and "What If... Thor Were an Only Child?", released in 2021.

In 2022, he joined the TNT series Snowpiercer for its fourth and final season. However, the series was cancelled by the network before it could air there. The fourth season was picked up by AMC, and aired in 2024.

== Personal life ==
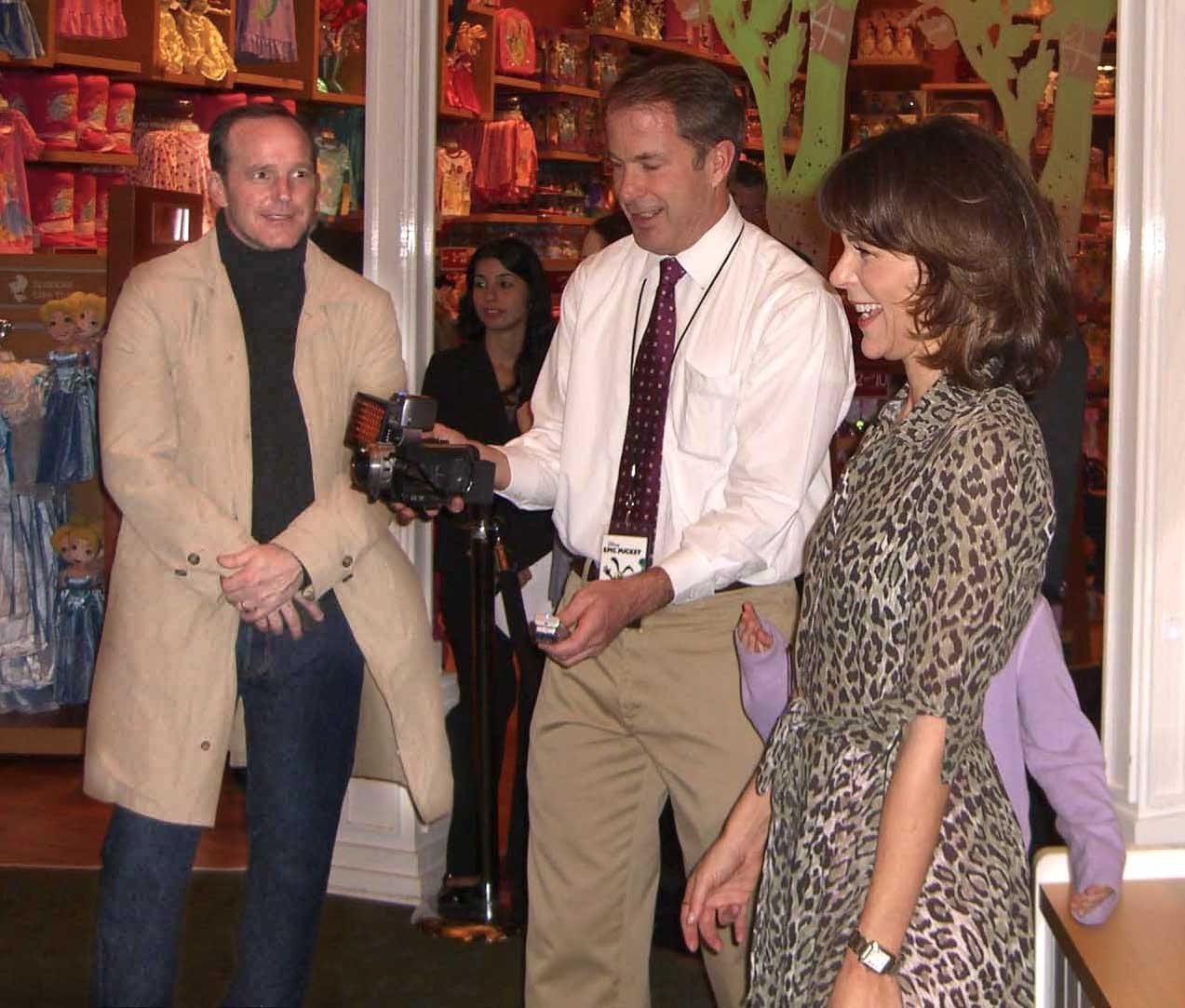
Gregg (left) with his then-wife, Jennifer Grey (right), at the November 30, 2010 Epic Mickey launch party in Manhattan

Gregg married actress Jennifer Grey on July 21, 2001; the couple co-starred in the Lifetime TV movie The Road to Christmas. They have a daughter, born December 3, 2001. Gregg and Grey were two of the demonstrators at the 2017 Women's March held on January 21, 2017, in Washington, D.C. On July 3, 2020, Grey and Gregg announced that they had separated amicably on January 18, 2020, and were in the process of divorcing. Their divorce ruling was issued in November, and became finalized on February 16, 2021.

Gregg is a sober alcoholic, and describes himself as a member of a Jewish family (his former wife's faith).

He has a black belt in Brazilian jiu-jitsu.

Gregg is a cousin of New York State government official and former New York City mayoral candidate Kathryn Garcia.

== Filmography ==
=== Film ===
Year	Title	Role	Notes	Ref.
1988	Things Change	Stage Manager		
1989	Fat Man and Little Boy	Douglas Panton		
1991	Lana in Love	Marty		
1994	Ride Me	Jake Shank		
1994	I Love Trouble	Darryl Beekman Jr.		
1994	Clear and Present Danger	Staff Sergeant		
1995	The Usual Suspects	Dr. Ridgly Walters		
1995	Above Suspicion	Randy		
1997	The Spanish Prisoner	FBI Sniper		
1997	The Last Time I Committed Suicide	Cop No. 1		
1997	Six Ways to Sunday	Benjamin Taft		
1998	The Adventures of Sebastian Cole	Hank / Henrietta Rossi		
1999	Magnolia	WDKK Floor Director		
2000	State and Main	Doug Mackenzie		
2000	What Lies Beneath	None	Screenwriter	
2001	A.I. Artificial Intelligence	Supernerd		
2001	Lovely & Amazing	Bill		
2002	One Hour Photo	Det. Paul Outerbridge		
2002	We Were Soldiers	Capt. Tom Metsker		
2003	Northfork	Mr. Hadfield	Uncredited	
2003	11:14	Officer Hanna		
2003	The Human Stain	Nelson Primus		
2004	Spartan	Miller		
2004	In Enemy Hands	Executive Officer Teddy Goodman		
2004	In Good Company	Mark Steckle		
2006	When a Stranger Calls	Ben Johnson		
2006	Bickford Shmeckler's Cool Ideas	Publisher		
2006	Hoot	Chuck Muckle		
2007	In the Land of Women	Nelson Hardwicke		
2007	The Air I Breathe	Henry		
2008	Choke	Lord High Charlie	Also screenwriter and director	
2008	Iron Man	Agent Phil Coulson		
2009	500 Days of Summer	Vance		
2010	Iron Man 2	Agent Phil Coulson		
2011	Thor	Agent Phil Coulson		
2011	Mr. Popper's Penguins	Nat Jones		
2011	The Consultant	Agent Phil Coulson	Short film	
2011	A Funny Thing Happened on the Way to Thor's Hammer	Agent Phil Coulson	Short film	
2012	The Avengers	Agent Phil Coulson		
2012	Much Ado About Nothing	Leonato		
2012	Brightest Star	Mr. Markovic		
2013	The To Do List	Judge George Klark		
2013	Labor Day	Gerald Wheeler		
2013	Trust Me	Howard Holloway	Also screenwriter, producer, and director	
2014	Very Good Girls	Edward Berger		
2015	Thrilling Adventure Hour Live	Mason Grantz		
2016	Live by Night	Chief Inspector Calvin Bordurant		
2018	Spinning Man	Paul		
2019	Captain Marvel	Agent Phil Coulson		
2020	Run Sweetheart Run	James R. Fuller		
2021	Moxie	John		
2021	Being the Ricardos	Howard Wenke		
2022	The Anthrax Attacks: In the Shadow of 9/11	Bruce Edwards Ivins	Documentary	
2024	Thelma	Alan		
2025	G20	Vice President Harold Mosely		
2025	War of the Worlds	Donald Briggs		

=== Television ===
Year	Title	Role	Notes	Ref.
1988	Lip Service	Stage Manager	Television film	
1991	Law & Order	Patrick Dunne	Episode: "Life Choice"	
1991	Shannon's Deal	Mercer	2 episodes	
1991	A Woman Named Jackie	Ken O'Donnell	Miniseries	
1993	The Young Indiana Jones Chronicles	Dickinson	Episode: "Princeton, February 1916"	
1994	The George Carlin Show	Dad	Episode: "George Does A Bad Thing"	
1995	Tyson	Kevin Rooney	Television film	
1995	The Commish	Tom Cannon	2 episodes	
1995	Central Park West	Manager	Episode: "Behind Your Back"	
1996	Touched by an Angel	Don Dudley	Episode: "Lost and Found"	
2000	Sports Night	The Stranger / Calvin Trager	2 episodes	
2000	Sex and the City	Harris Bragen	Episode: "Don't Ask, Don't Tell"	
2000	The Practice	Julie McGrath's Brother	Episode: "Brother's Keepers"	
2001–2004	The West Wing	FBI Special Agent Michael Casper	8 episodes	
2002	My Sister's Keeper	Harvey	Television film	
2002	Live from Baghdad	Eason Jordan	Television film	
2003	Will & Grace	Cam	Episode: "May Divorce Be with You"	
2004	The Shield	William Faulks	2 episodes	
2005	CSI: NY	D.A. Allen McShane	Episode: "The Fall"	
2006	The Road to Christmas	Tom Pullman	Television film	
2006–2010	The New Adventures of Old Christine	Richard Campbell	Main role	
2012–2013	Ultimate Spider-Man	Phil Coulson, Nanny Bots	Voice; main cast; 29 episodes	
2013	Comedy Bang! Bang!	Himself	Episode: "Clark Gregg Wears a Navy Blazer & White Collared Shirt"	
2013–2020	Agents of S.H.I.E.L.D.	Phil Coulson / Pachakutiq / Sarge	Main role; 136 episodes Also directed episodes: "Fun & Games" and "Missing Pieces"	
2015	Agents of S.H.I.E.L.D.: Double Agent	Himself	Episode: "The Mastermind Is Revealed"	
2016	Lip Sync Battle	Himself	Episode: "Clark Gregg vs. Hayley Atwell"	
2016	BattleBots	Himself	Episode: "The Gears Awaken"	
2016	Agents of S.H.I.E.L.D.: Academy	Himself	2 episodes	
2016	Agents of S.H.I.E.L.D.: Slingshot	Phil Coulson	Episode: "Vendetta"	
2019	SMILF	Mr. Daddy	Episode: "Single Mom is Losing Faith"	
2020	The Conners	Ron	2 episodes	
2021; 2024	What If...?	Phil Coulson	Voice, 3 episodes	
2023	Florida Man	Deputy Sheriff Ketcher	Miniseries; 7 episodes	
2023	How I Met Your Father	Nick Foster	3 episodes	
2023	Painkiller	Arthur Sackler	Miniseries; 6 episodes	
2024, 2026	Criminal Minds: Evolution	FBI Director Ray Madison	Recurring role; season 17 & season 19	
2024	Will Trent	Arthur Highsmith	Episode: "Me Llamo Will Trent"	
2024	Snowpiercer	Admiral Anton Milius	Main role (season 4)	
2025	Zero Day	Robert Lyndon	Recurring role	
2025	Murderbot	Arletty (playing Lieutenant Kulleruu)	Recurring role	
2025	The Artist	Harry Kendall Thaw	6 episodes	
2026	Big City Greens	General	Voice; Episode: "Fitness Test"	

=== Video games ===
Year	Title	Voice role	Notes
2013	Lego Marvel Super Heroes	Phil Coulson	
2013	Marvel Heroes	Phil Coulson	
2016	Lego Marvel's Avengers	Phil Coulson	

=== Theater ===
Year	Title	Role	Venue	Ref.
1988	Boys' Life	Jack	Mitzi E. Newhouse Theater, Off-Broadway	
1989	A Few Good Men	Lt. Jack Ross	Music Box Theatre, Broadway	
1991	Unidentified Human Remains and the True Nature of Love	Bernie	Orpheum Theatre, Off-Broadway	
1991	The Old Boy	Bud	Playwrights Horizons, Off-Broadway	
1992	Nothing Sacred	Bazarov	Linda Gross Theater, Off-Broadway	
1997	Mojo	Baby	Linda Gross Theater, Off-Broadway	
2000	Sexual Perversity in Chicago	Bernard	Linda Gross Theater, Off-Broadway	
2003	The Night Heron	Griffin	Linda Gross Theater, Off-Broadway	
2011	Happy Hour	Koch, Buck	Peter Norton Space, Off-Broadway	
2025	Good Night, and Good Luck	Don Hollenbeck	Winter Garden Theatre, Broadway	
2026	Romeo & Juliet	Lord Capulet	Harold Pinter Theatre, West End	

== Awards and nominations ==
Year	Award	Category	Work	Result
2000	Film Independent Spirit Award	Best Supporting Male	The Adventures of Sebastian Cole	Nominated
2000	National Board of Review Award	Best Acting by an Ensemble	State and Main	Won
2001	Online Film Critics Society Award	Best Ensemble Cast Performance	State and Main	Won
2001	Florida Film Critics Circle Award	Best Ensemble Cast	State and Main	Won
2006	Women's Image Network Award	Outstanding Lead Actor in a Comedy Series	The New Adventures of Old Christine	Won
2008	Sundance Film Festival Award	Grand Jury Prize - Dramatic	Choke	Nominated
2008	Sundance Film Festival Award	Special Jury Prize: Dramatic, Work by an Ensemble Cast	Choke	Won
2013	Saturn Award	Best Supporting Actor	The Avengers	Won
