= Alexander Peskanov =

American classical composer

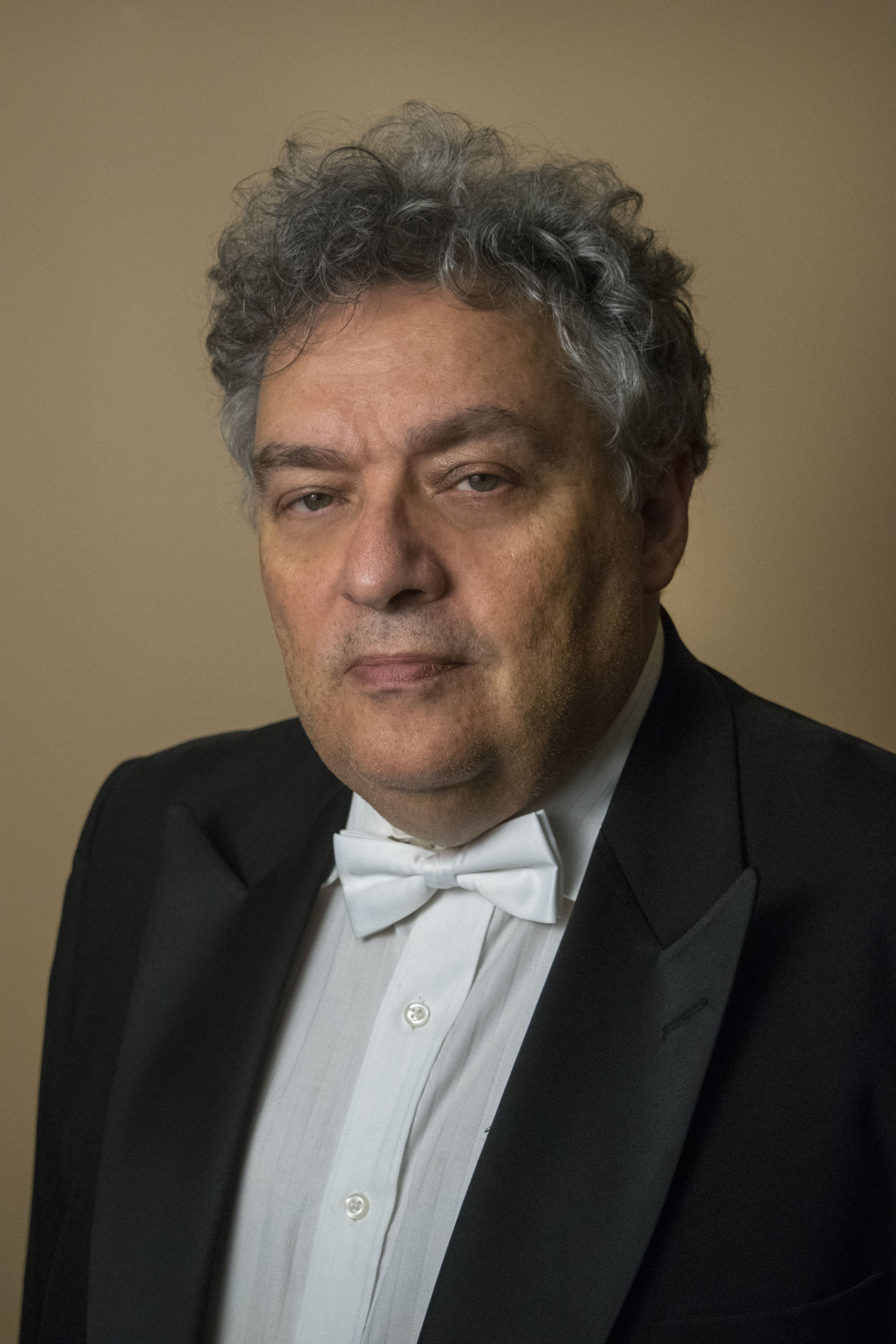

Alexander Peskanov (Ukrainian: Олександр Пєсканов, romanized: Oleksandr Pieskanov; Russian: Александр Песканов, born 1955, Odesa, Ukraine) is a Ukrainian-American concert pianist and composer.

== Life ==
Alexander Peskanov was born in Odesa, Ukraine, where he attended the Stoliarsky School of Music, studying first under Rosalia Leontievna Molodietzkaya, who was a grand-pupil of Theodor Leschetizky. He emigrated to the United States from the Soviet Union in 1973, and attended the Juilliard School of Music, studying with Ania Dorfmann. His solo career debut was with Mstislav Rostropovich and the National Symphony. He has also appeared with the London Symphony Orchestra, the English Chamber Orchestra, SABC Symphony Orchestra, Cape Town Philharmonic Orchestra, Polish Chamber Philharmonic Orchestra, Bogotá Philharmonic, Venezuela Symphony Orchestra, the Hong Kong Philharmonic, as well as in the United States with the Baltimore, St. Louis, Houston, Utah, Richmond and Pacific Symphonies, and collaborated with Maurice Andre, Jean-Pierre Rampal and Yo-Yo Ma.

Peskanov has performed at the Wolf Trap, Aspen, Grant Park, Newport, Seattle, Vancouver, Monterrey, Sarasota and Flagstaff festivals, and in coast-to-coast recitals including a piano recital at Avery Fisher Hall, Lincoln Center as part of the series, "Russian Splendor," the Van Cliburn Foundation Series in Ft. Worth, Texas, and the Gina Bachauer Piano Festival in Salt Lake City, Utah. He was a featured soloist at The 3rd Sopot International Music Festival in Poland in the performance of the Tchaikovsky Piano Concerto No.1.

Peskanov founded a new piano syllabus/event, Piano Olympics in 1991, a program for evaluation of piano technical skills and authored a series of six books, The Russian Technical Regimen for the Piano, published by Hal Leonard/Willis Music. He has also produced the movie soundtracks of He Knows You're Alone (1980 film) in collaboration with his brother, Mark Peskanov, The Clairvoyant (1982 film), The Lottery Rose (1984 film), as well as the music score for the musical Blockheads, original 1984 London production.

== Composing ==
Peskanov is a composer of numerous works, but has mainly focused on music involving the piano. Peskanov has written 22 piano concertos, including 18 for young pianists of different levels. His Concerto No. 1 for Piano and Strings, Concerto No. 8 "Spring Concerto," Concerto No. 16 "Fate or Destiny" and Concerto No. 17 "In Baroque Style" as well as two compositions for Flute and Piano, Sicilienne Impromptu and Irish Poem were selected by the National Federation of Music Clubs for Festival Bulletin of 2024-2028. The score and recording of Concerto No. 1 for Piano and Strings were released by Hal Leonard Publications. Between 2013 and 2016, Peskanov Piano Concertos Nos. 1, 6, and 10 were performed by the Tallinn Chamber Orchestra and were broadcast on Estonian National Radio. In the summer of 2014, Peskanov's Concerto No. 2 was premiered in Mexico at the Zacatecas International Music Festival. The winners of the 2015 Brown Piano Concerto Competition have performed his Concerto No.1. In October 2015, Peskanov's Concerto No.5 was premiered in New York at the Carnegie Hall Gala Fundraiser, entitled, "Express Yourself Through Music" and dedicated to Musical Education and Autism. Peskanov's Piano Concerto No. 3 (Maryland Concerto) and Piano Concerto No. 7 (Anniversary Concerto) were premiered at Piano Concerto Extravaganza at College of Music, Payap University in Thailand. In April 2017, Peskanov's Spring Concerto and Azery Rhapsody for Piano and Orchestra had their world premieres at Carnegie/Weill Recital Hall by young piano soloists from 4 continents. In November 2017 the same two concertos had their European premieres at St. John's Smith Square, Westminster, in London. Also, the Concerto No.7 (Anniversary Concerto) was premiered in South Africa and Concerto No. 1 for Piano and Strings was premiered at Prince Alfred College in Adelaide, Australia. In 2017, thirteen Piano Concertos by Alexander Peskanov were featured in newly released "The Pianist's Guide to Standard Teaching and Performance Concertos" by Karen Beres and Christopher Hahn, published by Alfred Music. The new releases included several piano trios, written for Six Hands and the "Spring Concerto" for Piano and Orchestra, published in 2015 by Alfred Music and selected for the National Federation of Music Clubs’ 2017–2020. Peskanov is the recipient of three special ASCAP awards.

One of his compositions, Temptations, was animated by Stephen Malinowski.

== Albums ==
- Brahms: Violin Sonatas - Eugene Fodor (Violin), Alexander Peskanov (Piano) (Clarity Records)
- Brahms: Violin Sonatas - Ilya Kaler (Violin), Alexander Peskanov (Piano) (Naxos Records)
- Morton Gould: Concerto Concertante - Masako Yanagita (violin)/Alexander Peskanov (piano)/Bronx Arts Ensemble (Musical Heritage Society)
- Spirits of the Wind – Peskanov Plays Peskanov (Touchwood Records)
- Scott Joplin: Piano Rags (Naxos Records)

== Compositions ==
=== Concertos ===
- Concerto for Piano Quartet and Orchestra (for four pianists on two pianos and orchestra)
- Concerto for Two Pianos and Orchestra
- Concerto No. 1 for Piano and Strings (Arranged for Two Pianos)
- Concerto No. 2 “Ukrainian Concerto” for Piano and Orchestra (Arranged for Two Pianos)
- Concerto No. 3 “Maryland Concerto” for Piano and Orchestra (Arranged for Two Pianos)
- Concerto No. 4 for Piano and Orchestra (Arranged for Two Pianos)
- Concerto No. 5 for Piano and Orchestra (Arranged for Two Pianos)
- Concerto No. 6 for Piano and Orchestra (Arranged for Two Pianos)
- Concerto No. 7 "Anniversary Concerto" for Piano and Orchestra (Arranged for Two Pianos)
- Spring Concerto for Piano and Orchestra (Arranged for Two Pianos)
- Concerto No. 9 “Boston Concerto” for Piano and Orchestra (Arranged for Two Pianos)
- Concerto No. 10 “Italian Concerto” for Piano and Orchestra (Arranged for Two Pianos)
- Concert Fantasy for Piano and Orchestra (Arranged for Two Pianos)
- Concerto No. 12 “Gypsy Concerto” for Piano and Orchestra (Arranged for Two Pianos)
- Azery Rhapsody for Piano and Orchestra (Arranged for Two Pianos)
- Concerto No. 14 “Concert Suite” for Piano and Orchestra (Arranged for Two Pianos)
- Concerto No. 15 for Piano and Orchestra (Arranged for Two Pianos)
- Concerto No. 16 “Fate or Destiny” for Piano and Orchestra (Arranged for Two Pianos)
- Concerto No. 17 "In Baroque Style" for Piano and Strings (Arranged for Two Pianos)
- Concerto No. 18 "In Classical Style" for Piano and Strings (Arranged for Two Pianos)
- Concerto No. 19 "Whimsical Jubilee" for Piano and Orchestra (Arranged for Two Pianos)
- Concerto No. 20 "Latin Concerto" for Piano and Orchestra (Arranged for Two Pianos)
- Concerto No. 21 "Mozartiana" for Piano and Orchestra (Arranged for Two Pianos)
- Concerto No. 22 "Hong Kong Concerto" for Piano and Orchestra (Arranged for Two Pianos)
- Maryland Concerto for Alto Saxophone and Orchestra (Arranged for Alto Saxophone and Piano)
- Royal Concerto for Trumpet and Orchestra (Arranged for Trumpet and Piano)

=== Solo piano ===
- Peskanov's Musical Gallery - Book 1 (solo piano collection)
- Peskanov's Musical Gallery - Book 2 (solo piano collection)
- Peskanov's Musical Gallery - Book 3 (solo piano collection)
- Peskanov's Musical Gallery - Book 4 (solo piano collection)
- Peskanov's Musical Reflections - Book 1 (solo piano collection)
- Peskanov's Musical Reflections - Book 2 (solo piano collection)
- Musical Collage (solo piano collection)
- Tribute to the Masters (solo piano collection)
- Lu Ann's Waltz
- Clouds
- The Rain
- Russian Winter
- Prelude in D
- Smoky Mountain Rag
- Sweet Dreams
- Waltz Scherzo
- Temptations
- Joker's Waltz
- Leave It To Me
- I Like It!
- Intermezzo
- Sonata (Homage to Scarlatti)
- Ghost Story
- Elegie
- Farewell Waltz
- Brasileira
- Hong Kong Serenade
- Mexican Ballade
- Doorbell Marimba
- My Baby's Rag
- Balletto
- Black Key Blues

=== Multiple pianists ===
- Sinfonietta (1 Piano, 4 Hands)
- Country Rag (2 Pianos, 4 Hands)
- Little Rock Suite - Book 1 (1 Piano, 6 Hands)
- Little Rock Suite - Book 2 (1 Piano, 6 Hands)
- Little Rock Suite - Book 3 (1 Piano, 6 Hands)
- Sunshine Suite - Book 1 (1 Piano, 6 Hands, 4 Hands and Solos)
- Sunshine Suite - Book 2 (Piano Duets and Solos)
- Chinatown Dragons (1 Piano, 6 Hands)
- Music of Our World, arranged by Irina Mints (1 Piano, 4 Hands)

=== Chamber music ===
- Equestrian Suite (Flute & Piano)
- Irish Poem (Flute and Piano)
- Sicilienne Impromptu (Flute and Piano)
- Mambo, Arranged for Flute by Maria Lourdes Lobo (Flute and Piano)

== Books ==
- Piano Olympics Manual
- Piano Olympics Student Assignments - Level 1
- Piano Olympics Student Assignments - Level 2
- Piano Olympics Student Assignments - Level 3
- Piano Olympics Student Assignments - Level 4
- Piano Olympics Student Assignments - Level 5
- Piano Olympics Student Assignments - Level "C"
- The Russian Technical Regimen for the Piano - 6 Part Series

== Videos ==
- "In Search of Sound" (Beginner, Intermediate, Virtuoso) - 3 Part Series
