= Artist on Fire =

1987 Canadian documentary film

- Directed by: Kay Armatage
- Produced by: Barbara Tranter
- Starring: Joyce Wieland
- Cinematography: Babette Mangolte; Peter Mettler
- Edited by: Petra Valier
- Production company: Dominion Pictures
- Distributed by: Canadian Filmmakers' Distribution Centre
- Release date: June 1987
- Running time: 54 minutes
- Country: Canada
- Language: English

Artist on Fire (also known as Artist on Fire: Joyce Wieland or Artist on Fire: The Work of Joyce Wieland) is a Canadian documentary film, directed by Kay Armatage and released in 1987. The film is a portrait of Canadian feminist artist and filmmaker Joyce Wieland.

The film premiered in June 1987 at the International Women's Festival of Film and Video in Montreal, and was later screened in the Perspectives Canada stream at the 1987 Toronto International Film Festival.

At TIFF, the film received an honorable mention from the jury for the Toronto International Film Festival Award for Best Canadian Film.
