= Nelly Alard =

French actress, screenwriter and novelist

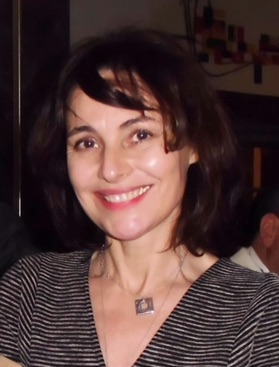
Nelly Alard

Nelly Alard (born 1960) is a French actress, screenwriter and novelist, graduated from the Conservatoire national supérieur d'art dramatique in Paris in 1985.

== Filmography ==
=== Actress ===
- 1983: Life Is a Bed of Roses
- 1984: Les Fils des alligators (TV): Hélène
- 1986: Marée basse
- 1988: L'Enfance de l'art
- 1990: Eating ou Le Dernier Secret des femmes: Martine
- 1992: Venice/Venice: Jeanne
- 1994: Opération cyanure (TV) episode of the series Renseignements généraux
- 1995: Les Eaux troubles de Javel (TV) episode of the series Nestor Burma: Elsa
- 1996: L'Appartement: Madeleine
- 1998: Le choix d'une mère (TV): Catherine
- 1999: Intrigues (TV) episode of the series Justice: Martine Mercier
- 2001: X-Fragile (TV) episode of the series Commissaire Moulin: Catherine Vaillant
- 2001: Duval: Un mort de trop (TV): Hélène Faucheux
- 2002: La Loi du sang (TV) episode of the series Le Grand Patron: Maude
- 2004: Le Mauvais Fils (TV) episode of the series Julie Lescaut: Émilie Lannée
- 2004: Petite môme (TV) episode of the series B.R.I.G.A.D.: Florence Varez
- 2004: Sur le fil du rasoir (TV) episode of the series B.R.I.G.A.D.: Florence Varez
- 2005: Un ami pour Élodie (TV) episode of the series Élodie Bradford: Florence Larcher
- 2006: Doubles vies (TV) episode of the series Sauveur Giordano: Marie
- 2006: De toute urgence! (TV) episode of the series Joséphine, ange gardien: La mère d'Éric
- 2006: Paris 2011: La grande inondation (TV) : Dr Jeanne Barot
- 2008: Le Poids du secret (TV) episode of the series Le Tuteur: Cécile Delcourt
- 2008: Frédéric (TV) episode of the series Cellule Identité: Castel Perrin
- 2008: Dominique (TV) episode of the series Cellule Identité: Castel Perrin
- 2008: Félix (TV) episode of the series Cellule Identité: Castel Perrin
- 2009: Ennemis jurés (TV) episode of the series Joséphine, ange gardien: Laure Blondel
- 2010: 1788... et demi (série TV): Anne de Tréville
- 2010: Risque majeur (TV) episode of the series Le juge est une femme: Hélène Dunand

=== Screenwriter ===
- 1989: Thank You Satan
- 1994: The Psychiatrist (TV) episode of the series Red Shoe Diaries
- 1996: Four on the Floor (TV) episode of the series Red Shoe Diaries

== Theatre ==
- 1983: The Master and Margarita by Mikhail Bulgakov, directed by Andrei Serban, Théâtre de la Ville
- 1984: L'Intervention after Victor Hugo, directed by Pierre Vial, Théâtre de l'Union
- 1986: Iliad by Homer, directed by Arlette Tephany, Théâtre de l'Union
- 1987: On achève bien les chevaux by Horace McCoy, directed by Micheline Kahn, Cirque d'hiver of Paris
- 1988: Amphitryon by Molière, directed by Jacques Lassalle, Théâtre national de Strasbourg - Théâtre de l'Est parisien
- 1989: Uncle Vanya by Anton Chekhov directed by Andonis Vouyoucas, Espace Paris Plaine, Paris
- 1992: Arlequin serviteur de deux maîtres by Carlo Goldoni, directed by Jean-Louis Thamin, Théâtre du Port de la Lune, Bordeaux
- 1993: Contre-jour by Jean-Claude Brisville and Jean-Pierre Miquel, Studio des Champs-Elysées, Paris
- 1994: La guerre de Troie n'aura pas lieu by Jean Giraudoux, directed by Francis Huster, Festival de Perpignan

== Novels ==
- 2010: Le Crieur de nuit. Blanche. Paris: Éditions Gallimard. 2010. p. 111. ISBN 978-2-07-012911-9. — Prix Roger Nimier 2010
- 2013: Moment d'un couple, Blanche, Paris: Éditions Gallimard, 2013, ISBN 978-2-07-014195-1 — Prix Interallié 2013
