= Venice/Venice =

- Directed by: Henry Jaglom
- Written by: Henry Jaglom
- Produced by: Judith Wolinsky
- Starring: Nelly Alard; Henry Jaglom; Suzanne Bertish; Melissa Leo; Daphna Kastner; David Duchovny; Diane Salinger
- Cinematography: Hanania Baer
- Edited by: Anna Stein
- Production company: The Rainbow Film Company
- Distributed by: Fox Lorber
- Release date: 1992
- Running time: 108 minutes
- Country: United States
- Language: English

Venice/Venice is a 1992 American film written and directed by Henry Jaglom and starring Henry Jaglom, Nelly Alard, Melissa Leo, Suzanne Bertish, Daphna Kastner, David Duchovny and John Landis.

== Plot ==
Dean is an American film director whose most recent film has been chosen for the Venice Film Festival. Beautiful French journalist Jeanne arrives at the festival with the intention of interviewing the eccentric Dean and in the midst of the festival madness, she is forced to confront the wide divergence between things as they really are and things as they seem to be, both on screen and off. Shot in Venice, Italy and Venice, California, Venice/Venice looks at the effect movies have on our lives, loves and dreams.

== Cast ==
- Nelly Alard as Jeanne
- Henry Jaglom as Dean
- Melissa Leo as Peggy
- Suzanne Bertish as Carlotta
- Daphna Kastner as Eve
- David Duchovny as Dylan
- Diane Salinger as Stephanie
- Suzanne Lanza as Girlfriend
- Vernon Dobtcheff as Alexander
- John Landis as Himself
- Sarah Gristwood as Journalist
- Phyllis Curott as Journalist
- Marcus Chong as Party Guest
- Sue Cameron as Interviewee
- Victoria Foyt as Interviewee
- Elizabeth Kemp as Interviewee
