= Spanish Fly (1998 film) =

- Theatrical release poster
- Directed by: Daphna Kastner
- Written by: Daphna Kastner
- Produced by: Juan Alexander
- Starring: Daphna Kastner; Toni Cantó; Martin Donovan; Danny Huston; Marianne Sägebrecht; Antonio Castro
- Cinematography: Arnaldo Catinari
- Edited by: Caroline Biggerstaff
- Music by: Mario de Benito
- Production company: Portman Productions
- Distributed by: Miramax Films
- Release dates: September 10, 1998 (TIFF); June 30, 1999 (France)
- Running time: 91 minutes
- Countries: France; Spain; United Kingdom
- Language: English
- Box office: $15,503

Spanish Fly is a 1998 French comedy film written and directed by Daphna Kastner and starring Daphna Kastner, Toni Cantó, Martin Donovan, Danny Huston, Marianne Sägebrecht and Antonio Castro. It was released in France on June 30, 1999, by Miramax Films.

== Plot ==
Zoe, an American writer, arrives in Madrid to research Spanish machismo. Struggling with the language, she hires Antonio as a translator. His dismissive attitude and tendency to fabricate answers frustrate her, sparking tension as she sees him embodying the machismo she's studying. Zoe's brief romance with an American bookseller further complicates her views on men.

== Cast ==
- Daphna Kastner as Zoe
- Toni Cantó as Antonio
- Martin Donovan as Carl
- Danny Huston as John
- Marianne Sägebrecht as Rosa
- Antonio Castro as Julio
- Maria de Medeiros as Rossy
- Vernon Dobtcheff as Carl's Friend
- Mary McDonnell as Zoe's Mother
- Rossy de Palma as Interviewee

== Production ==
The film was shot in Spain, in the town of Mojácar and in Madrid.

== Reception ==
Spanish Fly received generally mixed reviews from critics. Variety labelled it a "sexy comedy", but wrote in their August 1998 review that "Kastner's mannered acting style is better suited to supporting roles". In December 1999, Stephen Holden of The New York Times had a mixed review, writing "imagine a shrill, charmless 94-minute episode of Sex and the City set in Madrid with a central character who, like Carrie in that series, is a journalist writing about sex, and you have Daphna Kastner's abrasive comedy, Spanish Fly". Francis Rizzo of DVD Talk also gave the film a negative review, writing in November 2004, "it's truly a waste of your time to watch this confusing mess. The ridiculous philosophies, the questionable character motivation, the awful dialogue... it all adds up to an insult to your intelligence."

== Home media ==
Buena Vista Home Entertainment (under the Miramax Home Entertainment banner) released Spanish Fly on VHS in the United States on April 6, 1999. In approximately late 2001, it also received an Australian VHS release from Roadshow Entertainment, who had an Australian distribution agreement with Miramax at the time. On November 9, 2004, Buena Vista Home Entertainment/Miramax Home Entertainment released it on DVD in the United States.

In December 2010, Miramax was sold by The Walt Disney Company, their owners since 1993. That same month, the studio was taken over by private equity firm Filmyard Holdings. In 2011, Filmyard Holdings licensed the Miramax library to streamer Netflix. This deal included Spanish Fly, and ran for five years, eventually ending on June 1, 2016.

In March 2016, Filmyard Holdings sold Miramax to Qatari company beIN Media Group. Then in April 2020, ViacomCBS (now known as Paramount Skydance) bought a 49% stake in Miramax, which gave them the rights to the Miramax library. Spanish Fly is among the 700 titles they acquired in the deal, and since April 2020, the film has been distributed on digital platforms by Paramount Pictures.
