= A Bullet in the Head (1990 film) =

1990 film

- Film poster
- Directed by: Attila Bertalan
- Written by: Attila Bertalan
- Starring: Kathy Horner
- Production company: Creon Productions
- Release date: 17 August 1990
- Running time: 89 minutes
- Country: Canada
- Language: invented

A Bullet in the Head (French: Une balle dans la tête) is a 1990 Canadian drama film directed by Attila Bertalan. The film was selected as the Canadian entry for the Best Foreign Language Film at the 64th Academy Awards, but was not accepted as a nominee.

== Summary ==
The film centres on a soldier, wounded in war, who is struggling to survive after being trapped behind enemy lines.

The film's dialogue is spoken entirely in an invented language.

== Reception and legacy ==
Film historian Peter Cowie called it "a nightmarish fairytale about the absurdity and futility of war."

It was the first film ever selected as Canada's submission to the Academy Award competition for Best Foreign Language Film which was not in French, and one of just four such films overall alongside the later Atanarjuat: The Fast Runner, Water, Eternal Spring. and The Things You Kill.

== Cast ==
- Kathy Horner as Witch
- Andrew Campbell as Young Enemy Soldier
- Jan Stychalsky as Old Enemy Soldier
- Victoria Sands as Gypsy Woman
- Claude Forget as Wagon Driver
- Rebecca Posner as Katya
- Susan Eyton-Jones as Venna

== See also ==
- List of submissions to the 64th Academy Awards for Best Foreign Language Film
- List of Canadian submissions for the Academy Award for Best Foreign Language Film
