= Memoirs (film) =

- Directed by: Bashar Shbib
- Written by: Michel Gagnon; David Roche; Norma Jean Sanders; Bashar Shbib; Ian Stephens; John Beckett Wimbs
- Produced by: Grace Avrith; Mark Ettlinger; Jan Friedman; Denyse Ostiguy
- Starring: Philippe Baylaucq; Norma Jean Sanders; Julia Gilmore
- Cinematography: Christian Duguay; Bill Kerrigan
- Edited by: Bashar Shbib; Amy Webb
- Music by: Condition; Julia Gilmore; Edward Straviak; Philip Vezina
- Release date: 28 December 1984
- Running time: 83 min
- Country: Canada
- Language: English

Memoirs is a 1984 drama film co-written and directed by Bashar Shbib based on the play The Memoirs Of Johnny Daze by John Becket Wimbs.
