= Church of Our Lady Queen of Peace =

Church in New York, United States

Coordinates: 40°34′30.22″N 74°7′4.02″W

The Church of Our Lady Queen of Peace
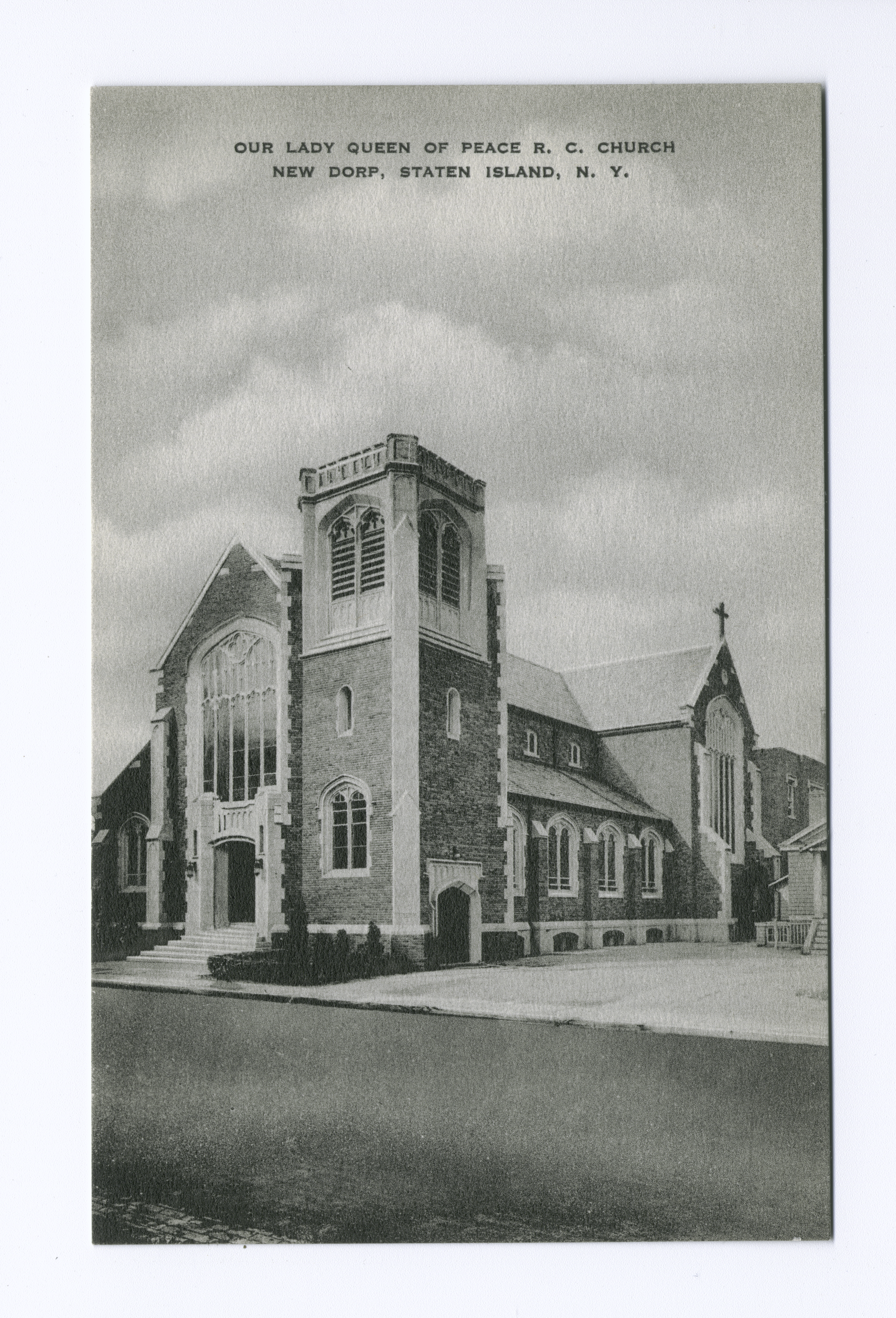
- Vintage postcard
- Interactive map of the The Church of Our Lady Queen of Peace area

General information
- Architectural style: English Gothic
- Location: Staten Island, New York City, United States of America
- Construction started: 1928
- Cost: $500,000
- Client: Roman Catholic Archdiocese of New York

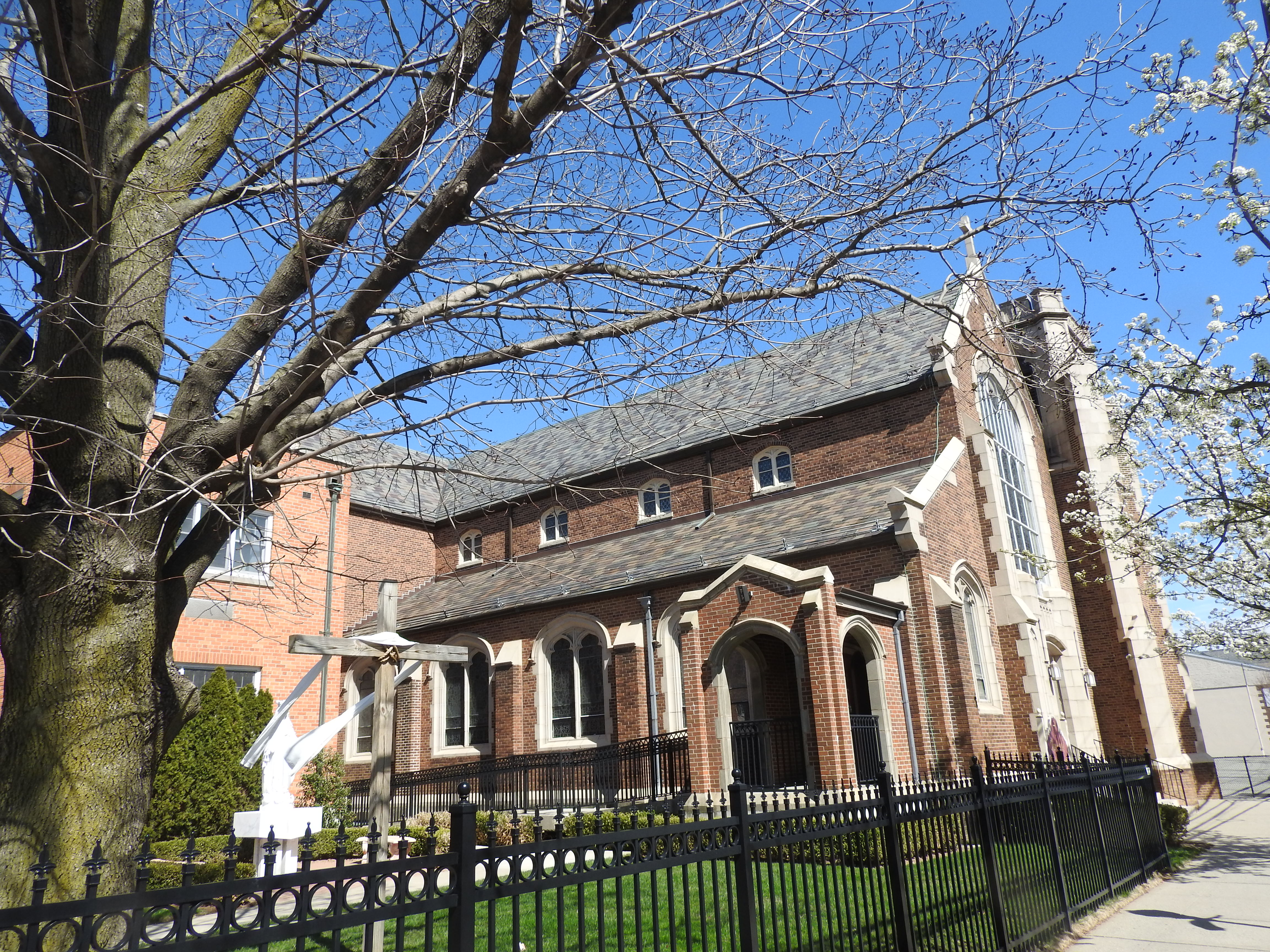
2018 photo

The Church of Our Lady Queen of Peace is a parish church in the Roman Catholic Archdiocese of New York, located at 90 Third Street in the New Dorp neighborhood of Staten Island, New York City. It was established on October 10, 1922, and the present church building was inaugurated on Christmas Eve, 1928.

== In popular culture ==
- The exterior of the church appears in the 1980 movie He Knows You're Alone.
- The wedding in the 1983 movie Easy Money was filmed at the church.
