= Clair Obscur (1988 film) =

- Directed by: Bashar Shbib
- Written by: Maryse Wilder; Bashar Shbib
- Produced by: Bashar Shbib; Hélène Verrier
- Starring: Daphna Kastner; David Duchovny; David Charles; Tim Ray; Clare Bancroft
- Cinematography: Stephen Reizes
- Edited by: Christophe Flambard; Albert Kish; France Renaud; Aaron Shuster
- Music by: François Giroux
- Distributed by: Cineplex Odeon Films
- Release date: September 1, 1988
- Running time: 75 min
- Country: Canada
- Languages: English; French

Clair Obscur is a 1988 film directed by Bashar Shbib.
