= Love $ Greed =

1991 film by Bashar Shbib

- Directed by: Bashar Shbib
- Written by: Bashar Shbib; Gabor Zsigovics
- Produced by: David Cohen; Janet Cunningham; Bashar Shbib; Haralabos Sugleris
- Starring: Frank Bryunbroek; David Charles; David Cohen
- Cinematography: Stephen Reizes
- Edited by: Florence Moureaux
- Music by: Emilio Kauderer
- Release date: 31 August 1991
- Running time: 89 min
- Countries: United States; Canada
- Language: English
- Budget: $220,000

Love $ Greed is a 1991 romantic comedy directed by Bashar Shbib.

== Synopsis ==
Robert and Alexandra have been divorced for some time. They are surprised to find out that Robert's uncle, Leopold, has left them an inheritance of $23 million on one condition: within a year, Robert and Alexandra must have a child. Although they have each remarried, they are drawn together by greed.

== Cast ==
Robert : Franck Bruynbroek
Alexandra : Melissa White
Suzie : Lori Eastside
Ted : Dick Monday
Bernie : David Charles

== Distribution and critical reception ==
Love $ Greed was presented as an official entry at the Montreal World Film Festival competition. This second American production for Bashar Shbib was less appreciated by some Quebec critics than his previous one, Julia Has Two Lovers. Nevertheless, Love $ Greed was still distributed in about fifty countries. Suzan Ayscough in Variety wrote "...a funny movie about lust, love and greed... (Melissa) White is a natural." Héléne de Billy in L'actualité described it as "...une histoire abracadabrante..." (...an abracadabra story...). Writing in La Presse Serge Dussault called it "Du gros rire...” ( Big laughs...).
