= Draghoula =

- Directed by: Bashar Shbib
- Written by: Bashar Shbib
- Produced by: Richard Goudreau; Bashar Shbib
- Starring: Stephanie Seidle; Chriss Lee; Robyn Rosenfeld
- Cinematography: Jay Ferguson
- Edited by: Meiyen Chan
- Music by: Sassy Scarlet; Talamasca
- Release date: 1995
- Country: Canada
- Language: English

Draghoula is a 1995 comedy horror film directed by Bashar Shbib.

== Plot ==
A tribute to the high concept trashiness of B-movies, the film centres on Harry (Chriss Lee), a scientist who is trying to locate the gene that controls guilt, but transforms into a combination vampire and drag queen after being bitten by one of his lab rats.

== Production ==
Lee, a musician with the band Talamasca, was cast in the lead role after Shbib saw his performance in a vampire-themed rock concert.

== Release ==
The film was subsequently screened on Showcase in 2001 as a Hallowe'en special.
