= Frances Bergen =

American actress and model

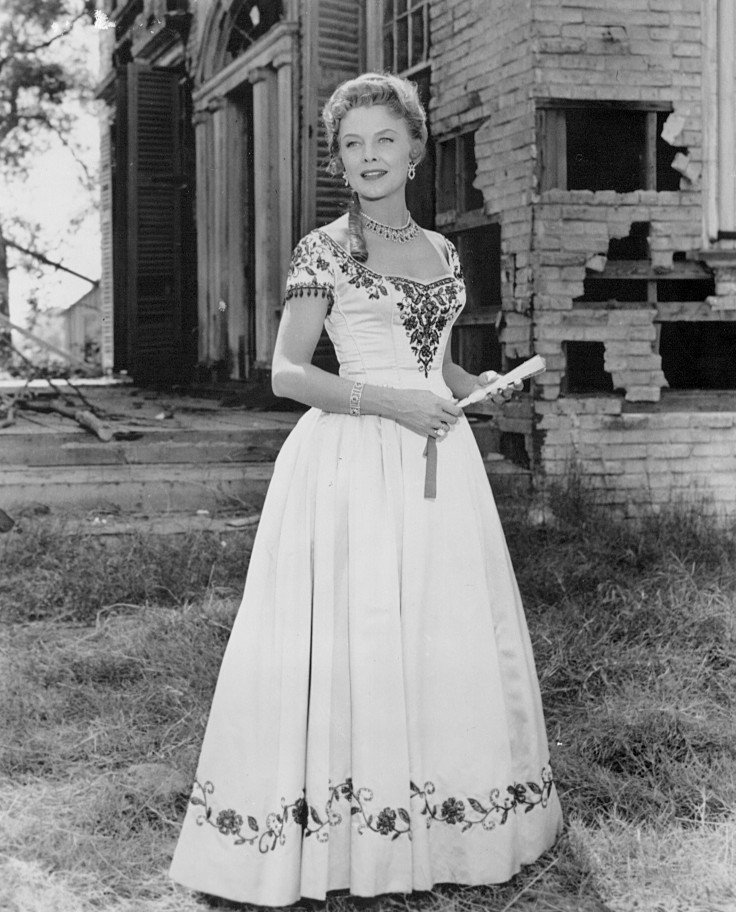
- Bergen in Yancy Derringer (1958)
- Born: Frances Westerman; September 14, 1922; Birmingham, Alabama, U.S.
- Died: October 2, 2006 (aged 84); Los Angeles, California, U.S.
- Other name: Frances Westcott
- Occupations: Film, television actress, model
- Years active: 1953–1998
- Spouse: Edgar Bergen (m. 1945; died 1978)
- Children: 2, including Candice Bergen
- Relatives: Chloe Malle (granddaughter)

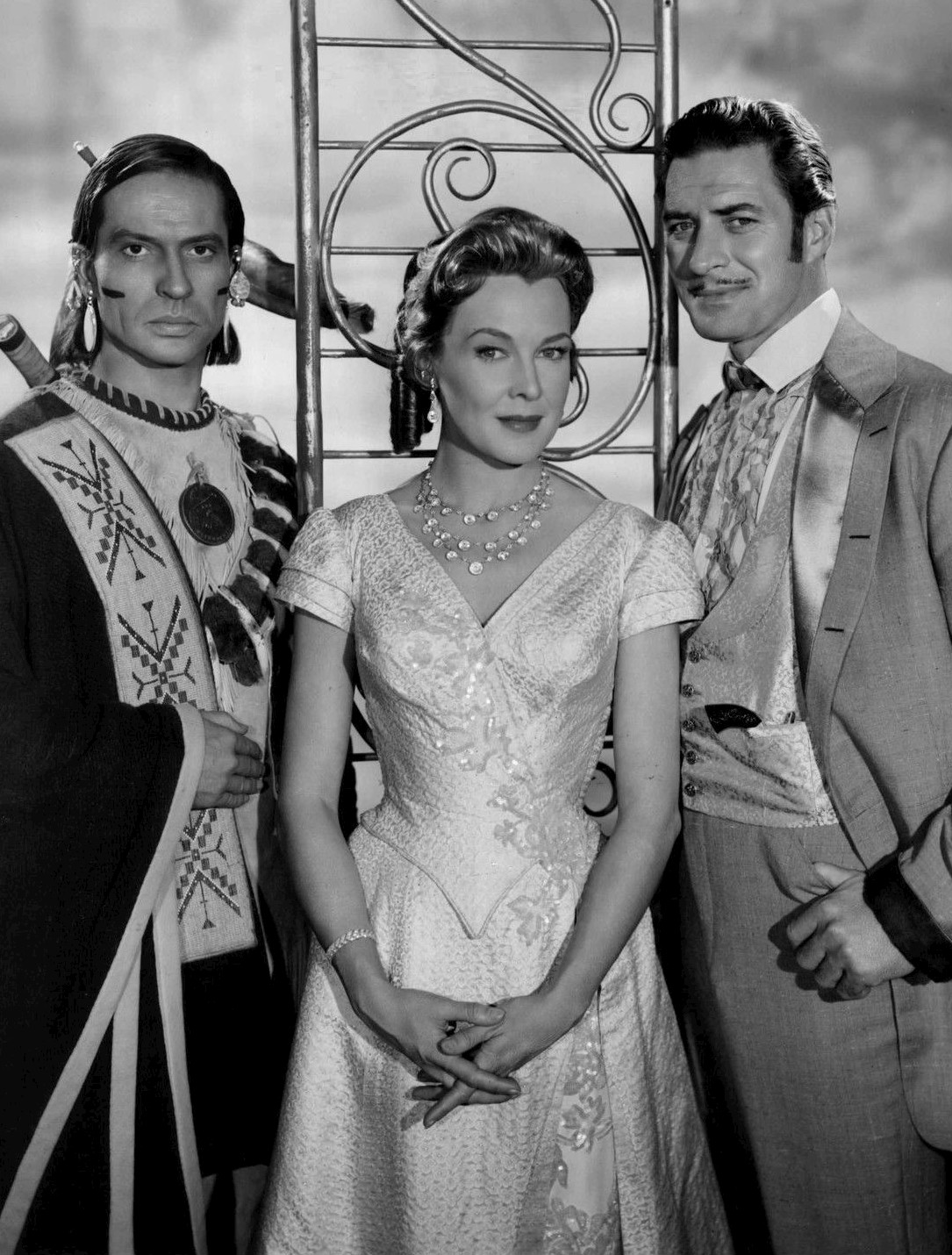
X Brands, Bergen, and Jock Mahoney

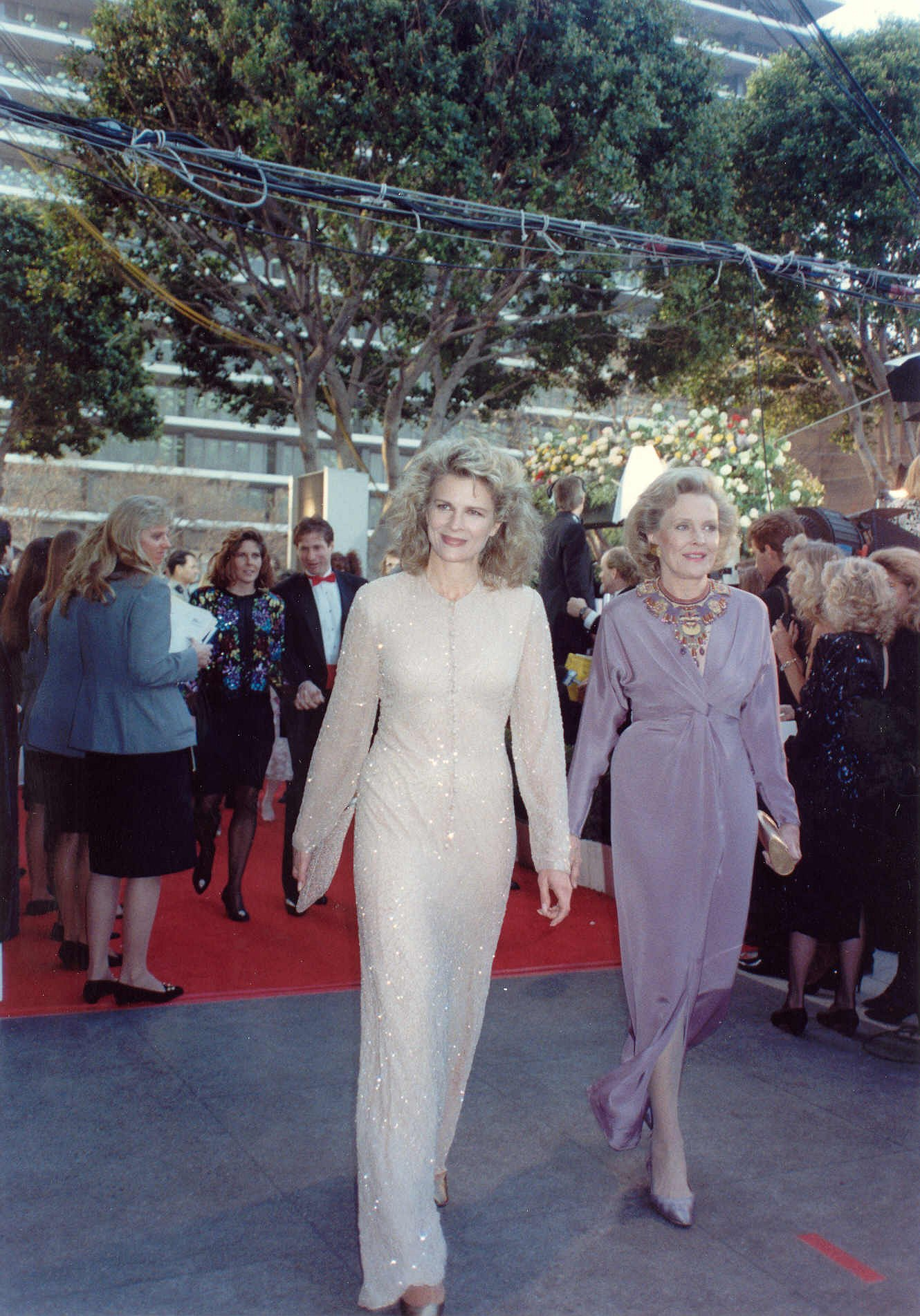
Candice Bergen and Frances Bergen at the 62nd Academy Awards, March 1990

Frances Bergen (née Westerman; September 14, 1922 – October 2, 2006) was an American actress and fashion model. She was the wife of ventriloquist Edgar Bergen and the mother of actress Candice Bergen and film and television editor Kris Bergen.

== Early life ==
Bergen was born in Birmingham, Alabama, and her family moved to Los Angeles when she was in her early teens. In 1932, her father died of tuberculosis, when Frances was ten years old. Shortly after, her mother moved the family to Los Angeles. She graduated from Los Angeles High School.

== Career ==
Bergen worked for an exclusive store in Los Angeles as a top fashion model before she moved to New York City. There she used the name Frances Wescott while she modeled for the John Robert Powers agency.

As an actress, Bergen had supporting or minor roles in a number of films. She made her debut in Titanic (1953), retaining the Wescott stage name, after which she appeared in Robert Z. Leonard's Her Twelve Men (1954), and Douglas Sirk's Interlude (1957). During the 1958-1959 television season, Frances became the recurring love interest on the western show Yancy Derringer as Madame Francine, the strong willed but beautiful owner of a members-only gambling house in New Orleans set in 1868.

In 1955 Bergen successfully debuted a singing act at the Hotel Monteleone in New Orleans. Her first record album was The Beguiling Frances Bergen, on Columbia Records, accompanied by accordionist Art Van Damme.

Bergen also made numerous other appearances on television, with guest starring roles on The Millionaire, The Dick Powell Show, Barnaby Jones, MacGyver, and Murder, She Wrote.

She returned to films in the 1980s, with small roles in American Gigolo (1980), The Sting II (1983), The Star Chamber (1983), The Muppets Take Manhattan (1984), Hollywood Wives (1985) (starring her famous daughter), The Morning After (1986), and Made in America (1993). She also had a major part in Henry Jaglom's independently made film Eating (1990). She appeared on two episodes of Murphy Brown, her daughter's hit show, including Part One of the series finale in 1998.

== Personal life ==
In 1941, Frances Westerman met Edgar Bergen after a radio program when he was 38 and she was 19. Westerman, who had graduated from Los Angeles High School the year before, was in the audience of Edgar Bergen's radio program as the guest of a member of his staff. Sitting in the front row, the young fashion model's long legs caught the attention of Bergen, who asked to meet her.

On June 23, 1945, the two were married in Ensenada, Mexico, after years of long distance courtship. They remained happily married until Edgar's death on September 30, 1978, at age 75.

On May 9, 1946, the couple welcomed their first child, Candice Bergen. Fifteen years later, on October 12, 1961, they had a son, Kris Edgar Bergen, who would later become a film and television editor.

== Death ==
On October 2, 2006, aged 84, Bergen died at Cedars-Sinai Medical Center in Los Angeles of undisclosed causes following "a prolonged illness".

== Filmography ==
Year	Title	Role	Notes
1953	Titanic	Madeleine Astor	
1954	Her Twelve Men	Sylvia Carlin	
1957	Interlude	Gertrude Kirk	
1980	American Gigolo	Mrs. Laudner	
1981	Rich and Famous	Literary Party Guest	
1983	The Sting II	Lady Dorsett	
1983	The Star Chamber	Mrs. Cummins	
1984	The Muppets Take Manhattan	Leonard Winesop's Receptionist	
1986	The Morning After	Mrs. Harding	
1990	Eating	Whitney	
1993	Made in America	White Woman #2	
