= Ania Dorfmann =

Russian-American pianist and teacher

- Born: July 9, 1899; Odessa, Russian Empire
- Died: April 21, 1984 (aged 84); New York City, New York, U.S.
- Other name: Anja Dorfmann
- Citizenship: American
- Education: Conservatoire de Paris
- Occupations: Pianist, music educator
- Years active: c. 1910–1983
- Employer: Juilliard School
- Known for: First female pianist engaged as a soloist by Arturo Toscanini
- Spouse: Vladimir Dorfmann
- Children: Natacha Ullman

Ania Dorfmann (9 July 1899 – 21 April 1984) was a Russian-American pianist and teacher, who taught at the Juilliard School in New York for many years and was the first of only a very few women pianists to play or record under Arturo Toscanini.

== Career ==
Ania Dorfmann was born in Odessa, Russia (now in Ukraine) in 1899, the daughter of a merchant. She gave her first concert at the age of 11. Around this time she accompanied the even younger Jascha Heifetz. In 1916-17 she studied in Paris with Isidor Philipp at the Conservatoire de Paris, then returned to Russia to find it in the midst of revolution. She returned to France in 1920, commenced her professional career in Belgium, and played throughout Europe and Britain for the next 15 years, under such conductors as Willem Mengelberg, Sir Thomas Beecham and Sir Henry Wood. She made her home in London during this time. Among the artists she appeared with in Britain were John McCormack and Heddle Nash.

She made her New York debut in 1936 at the Town Hall, and played there again in 1938 and 1939. She was the first female pianist ever engaged as a soloist by Arturo Toscanini, under whom she played Beethoven's Choral Fantasy with his NBC Symphony Orchestra on 2 December 1939, the only time Toscanini ever programmed that work. They later played all the Beethoven piano concertos, and recorded the First Concerto in 1945 (there is also a recording of a live performance from 1939). She settled in the United States in 1938, touring and recording. Her agent at that time was David Rubin. Her appearances included concerts under Serge Koussevitzky.

In 1947 Ania Dorfmann worked intensively with the actress Barbara Stanwyck, who was making the film The Other Love, in which she played a concert pianist. Although Ania Dorfmann played the piano music heard on screen, she had Stanwyck practise for three hours a day to make her actions match the music.

In 1956 (some sources say 1966) she joined the piano faculty of the Juilliard School, where she remained for most of the rest of her life. Ania Dorfmann's students included Lev Natochenny, Alexander Peskanov, Solveig Funseth, Minuetta Kessler, Raymond Jackson, Suezenne Fordham, Roman Markowicz, Robert Shannon, and Marian Migdal.

She retired in June 1983 and died on 21 April 1984, aged 84.

== Personal life ==
She was the wife of Vladimir Dorfmann, a Russian businessman she met in Paris. Their daughter, Natacha Ullman (1929-1986), was a writer who used the pen name Natacha Stewart; she was the author of "Evil Eye and Other Stories", and a frequent contributor to The New Yorker. Natacha had two sons, Nicolas and Alex Ullman.

== Recordings ==
Ania Dorfmann made a number of recordings primarily for RCA Victor, some of the most notable of which were:

- Beethoven: Piano Sonata No. 8 (Pathétique), Piano Sonata No. 14 (Moonlight)
- Beethoven: Triple Concerto, Michel Piastro, violin and Joseph Schuster, cello, NBC Symphony Orchestra, Arturo Toscanini, live recording
- Beethoven, Piano Concerto No. 1 in C major, NBC SO, Toscanini (2 recordings; one live recording from 1939 and a studio recording from 1945)
- Beethoven, Choral Fantasy, NBC SO, Toscanini, Carnegie Hall, December 1939, live recording
- Chopin: Tarantelle
- Chopin: Waltzes
- Grieg: Piano Concerto in A minor, Robin Hood Dell Orchestra, Erich Leinsdorf
- Liszt: Hungarian Rhapsody No. 10
- Mendelssohn: Piano Concerto No. 1 in G minor
  - London Symphony Orchestra, Walter Goehr
  - Robin Hood Dell Orchestra, Erich Leinsdorf
- Mendelssohn, Songs Without Words (complete)
- Menotti: Ricercare and Toccata
- Ravel: Sonatine
- Schumann: Carnaval, Op. 9
- Schumann: Fantasiestücke, Op. 12
- Schumann: Album for the Young, Op. 68, excerpts
- Johann Strauss II, arr Tausig: Valse-Caprice No. 2 "Man lebt nur einmal" (1938; only the second recording of this work, Sergei Rachmaninoff having first recorded it in 1927)
- Tchaikovsky: Album pour enfants, Op. 39, excerpts
- Tchaikovsky: The Seasons, excerpts
