= Lana in Love =

- Directed by: Bashar Shbib
- Written by: Daphna Kastner; Bashar Shbib
- Produced by: Janet Cunningham; Bashar Shbib; Halabos Sugleris
- Starring: Susan Eyton-Jones; Michael Gillis; Clark Gregg
- Cinematography: Stephen Reizes
- Edited by: Meiyen Chan; Bashar Shbib
- Music by: Harry Mayronne Jr.
- Release date: October 17, 1991
- Running time: 88 min
- Countries: United States; Canada
- Language: English

Lana in Love is a 1991 film directed by Bashar Shbib.
