= Stephen Malinowski =

American classical composer

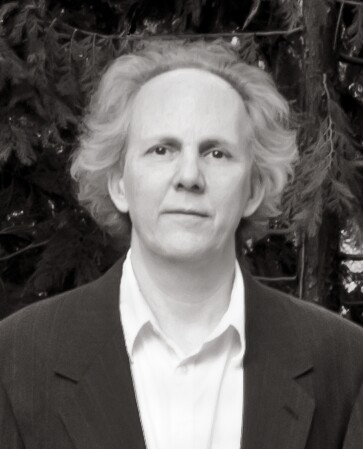
- Portrait of Stephen Malinowski, 2011
- Born: August 6, 1953 (age 73); Santa Monica, California
- Education: University of California, Santa Barbara (B.A.)
- Known for: Music Animation Software
- Patrons: Björk, Alexander Peskanov, Nuremberg Symphony Orchestra
- Website: Official homepage

Stephen Anthony Malinowski is an American composer, pianist, educator, software engineer, and inventor. He was born on August 6, 1953, in Santa Monica, California.

He is best known for his musical animations and his computer program, the Music Animation Machine, which produces animated graphical scores. He visualizes music using a system of colored shapes, taking information from a MIDI file. He has collaborated with artists such as Vincent Lo, Alexander Peskanov, Björk, and the Del Sol Quartet.

Malinowski studied music theory and composition with Thea Musgrave, Peter Fricker, Stanley Dale Krebs, and David Barton at the College of Creative Studies at the University of California, Santa Barbara, where he received a B.M. in 1981 and was a guest lecturer 1981–1982.

He began his experiments with animated graphical scores in 1974 after an experience he had listening to Johann Sebastian Bach. The first version of the Music Animation Machine software was created in 1985. In 1984 he began working as a software engineer. In 1990 Malinowski started selling video tapes with his animations on them, and Classic Arts Showcase began broadcasting his animations. In 2001, he began working on psychoacoustically-inspired audio processing algorithms.

In 2012, he developed a version of his Music Animation Machine that could synchronize his animations with realtime performances; he premiered it with the Nuremberg Symphony Orchestra, conducted by Alexander Shelley, on October 12 and 13. He also showcased the same technology in a TEDx talk in Zurich.

His animations have been featured by the recording artist Björk and also have been featured at the TEDx conference in Zurich, Switzerland.

As of April 28, 2026, his YouTube channel featuring his musical animations had received over 200 million views.

Stephen lives in northern California with his wife Christine.
