= Olga Bloom =

American violinist and violist

Olga Bloom (née Bayrack; April 2, 1919 - November 24, 2011) was an American violinist and violist who founded Bargemusic in 1977. Born and raised in Boston, she studied with Jacques Hoffman of the Boston Symphony Orchestra from age four and played with a young Leonard Bernstein while in high school. Upon her relocation to New York City after studying at the New England Conservatory of Music, she played for both a USO Orchestra, and the American Symphony Orchestra under Leopold Stokowski before turning to Broadway pit orchestras as a source of reliable work. She played in Kiss Me Kate, No, No, Nanette and many others.

Bloom's second husband was Tobias Bloom, who performed with the NBC Symphony Orchestra under Toscanini. Upon his death, and with the realization that performance opportunities weren't what they had been earlier in her and her husband's careers, she purchased the barge that would later become Bargemusic in response to a need for intimate performance spaces, performance options outside of Manhattan and reliable work for artists at a good pay. She even lived aboard the barge in its early years to save some money.

After purchasing the former coffee barge, Bloom refurbished over a series of years for use as a concert venue. She made paneling from a discarded Staten Island Ferry boat and added seating for 130 and four large windows from which the audience could take in the views of Lower Manhattan. Seating was expanded to 150 in the mid to late 80s as Bargemusic began to draw artists with pedigrees including London’s Royal Philharmonic, Amsterdam’s Concertgebouw, the Belgian National Orchestra and the New York Philharmonic. It also hosted winners and medalists of the Rostropovich, Piatigorsky, Queen Elisabeth and Tchaikovsky competitions.

Bloom remained active with Bargemusic until 2005 when she turned over day-to-day operations to Mark Peskanov and performed there as late as 2009 in celebration of her 90th birthday. She died in a Manhattan nursing home on Thanksgiving Day, 2011.

Selene Castrovilla's novel, Saved by the Music is based on Bloom's founding of Bargemusic.
