= Between the Moon and Montevideo =

2000 Canadian science fiction film

- Directed by: Attila Bertalan
- Written by: Attila Bertalan
- Produced by: Attila Bertalan; Pascal Maeder
- Starring: Attila Bertalan; Pascale Bussières
- Cinematography: François Dagenais
- Edited by: Aube Foglia
- Production company: Creon Productions
- Distributed by: Cinéma Libre
- Release date: July 13, 2000 (Fantasia)
- Running time: 115 minutes
- Country: Canada
- Language: English

Between the Moon and Montevideo is a Canadian science fiction film, directed by Attila Bertalan and released in 2000.

The film is set on a small asteroid orbiting between the Earth and the Moon, which has been settled by humans as a mining colony; poverty and despair are rampant, but the only way to return to Earth is a rocket belonging to Russian gangsters who charge far more money for passage than anybody but El Señor (Armando Fernandez Soler), the leader of the colony, can ever hope to attain. Bertalan himself stars as Tobi, a scrap dealer who teams up with hustler Tony-Lee (Russell Yuen) in a plan to steal El Señor's money so that he can return home to Montevideo. The film also stars Gérard Gagnon as Louis, an enforcer for the gangsters, and Pascale Bussières as Juta, Louis's girlfriend who is sympathetic to Tobi's plight as she also dreams of escaping.

The film was shot in Havana, Cuba in 1999. It premiered at the 2000 Fantasia Film Festival, before going into limited commercial release in 2001.

== Critical response ==
The film was not well received by critics. Glen Schaefer of The Province wrote that the film was intermittently interesting, but concluded that "the overall effect is of warmed-over Robert Rodriguez, or maybe Touch of Evil without Orson Welles or wit. A key plot turn near the end comes as an out-of-character betrayal, a cheat of the audience. Give Bertalan a break for the wacky physics behind this noir fantasy and he rewards you with a plot that ultimately makes little sense."

Rick Groen of The Globe and Mail wrote that "Visually, it makes for an arresting spectacle, but the film's lapses in cohesiveness suggest that, working on a tight location schedule, Bertalan may simply have run out of time and money to shoot the script he wanted, forcing him to patch over the shortfalls in the cutting room. If so, that's a shame, because there's much to delight both eye and ear here, including Bertalan himself. Bald and diminutive yet with a burly physique, he's an oddly compelling presence on camera, looking like some weird cross between Bruce Willis and Wallace Shawn — his very appearance is as genre-bending as his movie. Thanks to his various inputs, somewhere in Between the Moon and Montevideo, a good film is struggling to be born. In the interim, we're left to faintly praise the rough sketch and fondly wish for the finished picture."

Stephen Cole of the National Post wrote that except for Bussières the film wasn't particularly well-acted, concluding that "a stronger cast and a tighter script might have turned Between the Moon and Montevideo into something truly out of this world. As it stands, however, the film is no more than a striking, fatally flawed curiosity piece."

== Awards ==
Aube Foglia received a Jutra Award nomination for Best Editing at the 4th Jutra Awards in 2002.
