= Evixion =

- Directed by: Bashar Shbib
- Written by: Daphna Kastner; Bashar Shbib; Claire Nadon; Stephen Reizes
- Produced by: Bashar Shbib
- Starring: Roland Smith; Claire Nadon; Eric Gregor Pierce
- Cinematography: David Wellington
- Edited by: Bashar Shbib
- Music by: Biohazardous; Jean-Noël Bodo; François Giroux; Liver and Jean Leboeuf
- Release date: 26 August 1986
- Running time: 78 min
- Country: Canada
- Language: English

Evixion is a 1986 Canadian docudrama film produced and directed by Bashar Shbib. The film is about the tenants of a dilapidated apartment building in Montreal who receive an eviction notice and have to deal with the possibility of being homeless. The cast includes Roland Smith, Claire Nadon, Kennon Raines, Pierre Curzi, Piotr Lysak and Jean-Claude Gingras. It was criticized for its lack of a proper plot or purpose. It was first released on 26 August 1968 at the World Film Festival in Montreal.
