= Bargemusic =

Coordinates: 40°42′11.2″N 73°59′43″W

- Interactive map of Bargemusic
- Address: Fulton Ferry
- Location: Brooklyn, New York, United States
- Owner: Bargemusic, Ltd.
- Event: classical music

Construction
- Opened: 1977

Website
- bargemusic.org

Bargemusic, formally known as Bargemusic, Ltd. is a classical music venue in Brooklyn, New York. Founded in 1977, until 2025 it was housed in a converted coffee barge moored at Fulton Ferry Landing on the East River near the Brooklyn Bridge. Since April 5, 2025, Bargemusic has been hosting its concerts at the Brooklyn Bridge Park Boathouse.

== History ==
Olga Bloom founded Bargemusic in 1977, following the transformation of the coffee barge into a music hall in that same year, and the programming has evolved over time while not losing the intimacy of the performance space, which some compare to a floating living room. The barge itself dates to 1899.

"Actually, we're practicing great economy of motion here," said Bloom in 1990. "Water exerts a universal pull on humanity. People commune with nature here, to a degree. They even see a soaring seagull occasionally, and I have my scraggly, brave pines on the deck. We also offer an unmistakably warm social occasion. Our audiences are small — we can hold 140, but I usually try to cut off at 130 — so even though they don't know each other, they speak to each other readily during the intermissions. They are sharing values. And they are experiencing a noble performance of great music. All in one visit."

The barge, 102-feet long and built in 1899, was the third that Bloom purchased for this use after the first two barges' acoustics did not suit concert performances. She found the barge near the Statue of Liberty, and a tugboat captain advised her of the free slip near the Brooklyn Bridge that housed the barge.

In 2003, a mishap with a pipe nearly caused the barge to sink. It took hundreds of gallons of water into its bilge when a pipe feeding water into it snapped due to freezing weather. Listing, it began taking on seawater through a crack in its side. A repair crew pumped more than 1,500 gallons of water out of the bilge before it started to level.

In June 2017, Bargemusic won a bidding process that would have allowed it to remain at the Fulton Ferry Landing for an additional 20 years.

In January 2025, Bargemusic's board of directors learned the barge was no longer safe to operate due to extensive hull damage, and the barge was towed to a shipyard in Staten Island to be dismantled. However, the Brooklyn Bridge Park Corporation allowed Bargemusic to temporarily relocate performances to the park's boathouse, which offers a similar capacity as well as similar views of lower Manhattan.

Bargemusic has been led by violinist Mark Peskanov as executive and artistic director since 2006 and as of 2010 produced more than 200 concerts each year.

== Funding ==
Like many organizations in Lower Manhattan and throughout New York City, Bargemusic's attendance suffered after 9/11 and that caused questions about its continued existence. To make money, Bloom and Bargemusic rented the barge out for weddings and solicited donations from foundations, corporations, and individuals. Some believe that if Bargemusic were given landmark status, it would help secure the necessary corporate sponsorship to ensure the program's continued success.
