= Elizabeth Kemp =

American actress (1951–2017)

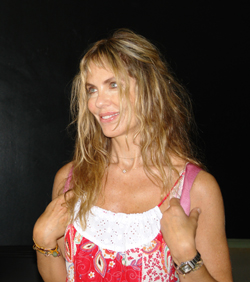
- Kemp in 2011
- Born: November 5, 1951; Key West, Florida, U.S.
- Died: September 1, 2017 (aged 65); Los Angeles, California, U.S.
- Education: American Academy of Dramatic Arts
- Occupations: Actress, acting coach
- Years active: 1973–2017

Elizabeth Kemp (November 5, 1951 – September 1, 2017) was an American actress, theatre director, and acting coach. She began her screen career playing Betsy in the television series Love of Life in 1973. She performed on stage many times as well as directing a number of productions in the US as well as internationally. She went on to become an acting coach and faculty member of the Actors Studio Drama School at Pace University.

== Early life and education ==
Elizabeth Kemp was born on November 5, 1951 in Key West, Florida, the daughter of Nancy Jean (Haycock) and Joseph Clifton Kemp, a business executive and U.S. Navy officer and test pilot stationed at the Pentagon.

Kemp showed talent as a child painter from age 13–16, and graduated from high school with a special award for creative achievement. At 16 she applied to the Rhode Island School of Design, but was told to wait a year.

She studied at the American Academy of Dramatic Arts and the Actors Studio in New York City, under Lee Strasberg.

== Career ==
=== Acting career ===
Kemp was in the original cast of The Best Little Whorehouse in Texas, which was developed at the Actors Studio and opened off-Broadway in 1978 before moving to Broadway, where it became a long-running hit. Her mentor, Elia Kazan, took Tennessee Williams to see Kemp in the show, when Williams was looking for an actress to play Baby Doll in the world premiere of one of his last plays, Tiger Tail. After the performance, Williams gave her the part, and she worked closely with him in developing the role. In 1978, she appeared on Broadway in a minor part in Once in a Lifetime.

She made her television debut in the series Love of Life in 1973.

In 1980, Kemp made her feature film debut in the horror film He Knows You're Alone, opposite Caitlin O'Heaney and Tom Hanks.

=== Directing ===
As a stage director, Kemp was responsible for many productions at The Actors Studio, including The Glass Menagerie, The Beauty Queen of Leenane, and the world premiere of Edward Allan Baker's Free Gift Inside. Internationally, Kemp directed The Stronger and Homesick at Strindberg's Intimate Theater in Stockholm, and Dreamstories at The Claude LeLouch Theatre Cine 13 in Paris and La Spazia Teatro in Rome.

=== Teaching ===
Kemp left Los Angeles and returned to New York City, where she worked odd jobs, including waiting tables at a restaurant. Soon after, she began teaching acting at the Strasberg Institute, then became a member of the Acting Faculty—and later, chair— of The Actors Studio Drama School at Pace University.

At the Actors Studio Drama School, Kemp was a mentor to student actors like Bradley Cooper and Poorna Jagannathan. She worked across the country at The California Actors Theatre in San Francisco, Alliance Theatre in Atlanta, Folger Theatre in Washington, D.C., Center Stage in Baltimore, and Walnut Street Theatre in Philadelphia.

She was also an artistic associate and tutor at 16th Street Actors Studio in Melbourne, Australia.

== Personal life ==
Kemp married actor Michael Margotta in New York City in 1984. They separated in June 1991 and later divorced. (Note: A 2012 CNN profile notes Kemp's divorce, but a year or date is not given, nor is it available in public records; the New York City Marriage Licenses Index, however, lists Margotta and Kemp's marriage as being in 1984.)

== Death ==
Kemp died of cancer on September 1, 2017, in Venice, Los Angeles, at age 65. She received several public tributes from former students Bradley Cooper, Hugh Jackman and Lady Gaga.

The 2018 film A Star Is Born is dedicated to her memory.

== Recognition and awards ==
Kemp became a lifetime member of The Actors Studio in 1975.

She received the GLAAD Award for her work on L.A. Law (1986).

== Filmography ==
=== Film ===
Year	Title	Role	Notes
1980	He Knows You're Alone	Nancy	
1982	The Clairvoyant	Virna Nightbourne	
1988	Sticky Fingers	Nancy	
1988	Police Story: Burnout	Patricia	Television film
1990	Family of Spies	Kay	
1990	Challenger	Jane Smith	Television film
1990	Eating	Nancy	
1991	Murderous Vision	Ellen Green	Television film
1992	Mom I Can Do It	Jane Morris	
1992	Venice/Venice	Interviewee	
1995	Animal Room	Shelly's Mom	
2005	Pills	Margaret Nolan	Short film
2012	Thanks Dad	Mom	Winner: Final 8 "TROPFEST", 2012
2013	Manito: Brother's Sacrifice	Lori	Short film
2014	Welcome to New York	Florence	
2015	Emperor of the Free World	Olympias	
2017	A Crack in Everything	Constance Marshall	

=== Television ===
Year	Title	Role	Notes
1973-1977	Love of Life	Betsy Crawford	Series regular
1979	Skyways	Rosemary	Episode: "Bird Strike"
1981	I Can Jump Puddles	Receptionist	Episode: "Getting Your Breath"
1988	Vietnam War Story	Lynn	Episode: "Dusk to Dawn"
1990	Thirtysomething	Kate	Episode: "The Distance"
1991	L.A. Law	Maggie Barnes	Episode: "The Nut Before Christmas"
2001–3	Law & Order	Laila Jacobs / Debbie Grimes	Episodes: "School Daze", "Blaze"
