= The Clairvoyant (1982 film) =

1982 American film directed by Armand Mastroianni

- Directed by: Armand Mastroianni
- Written by: Armand Mastroianni; B. Jonathan Ringkamp
- Produced by: Robert Di Milia; Edgar Lansbury
- Starring: Perry King; Elizabeth Kemp; Kenneth McMillan; Jon Polito
- Edited by: David E. McKenna
- Music by: Alexander Peskanov
- Distributed by: 20th Century Fox; Jensen Farley Pictures
- Release dates: October 24, 1982 (France); August 12, 1983 (Muskegon, Michigan)
- Running time: 97 minutes
- Country: United States
- Language: English

The Clairvoyant is a 1982 American psychological horror film directed by Armand Mastroianni and starring Perry King, Norman Parker, and Elizabeth Kemp. The plot follows a New York City detective and his friend who pursue a mysterious "handcuff killer" with the aid of an artist who sees—and draws—the killer's crimes before they are committed.

The film was originally acquired for distribution by 20th Century Fox, who released it directly to video in 1985 under the alternative title The Killing Hour. It did receive limited regional releases in the United States in 1983 through Jensen Farley Pictures, which were preceded by a theatrical release in France in October 1982. While not prosecuted for obscenity, the film was seized and confiscated in the UK under Section 3 of the Obscene Publications Act 1959 during the video nasty panic.

== Plot ==
After the body of murdered woman Elizabeth Mercer is found, nude and handcuffed, floating down the Hudson River in New York City, two men are murdered by an assailant who handcuffs them before killing them. Paul "Mac" McCormack, an ambitious TV talk-show host, and Larry Weeks, a police detective and aspiring stand-up comedian, team up to try to locate the killer. Meanwhile, Virna Nightbourne, a student at the Art Students League of New York, has been completing portraits which coincidentally appear to depict the crimes. Her roommate, Muriel, a nurse, has noticed the phenomenon. Virna is unable to explain where her impulse to draw them comes from.

Virna eventually draws a portrait of herself as one of the killer's victims, and has a nightmare about a woman being handcuffed to a bed. Frightened, she decides to go to police with her drawings. When pressed as to how she comes to make the drawings, Virna explains that it is unconscious, and that she has had precognitive and clairvoyant abilities since her childhood. She recounts a specific incident in which she helped save a missing girl, Elizabeth, from her hometown. Virna is horrified when police inform her that the woman found dead in the river was in fact the same Elizabeth from Virna's childhood, who, as an adult, worked as a bartender a BDSM leather bar.

A third male victim—this time a prostitute's john—is handcuffed in an elevator shaft and crushed by the moving car. Meanwhile, both Mac and Larry attempt to begin romances with Virna. Mac is attacked in his apartment by a young man, later identified as Willie Gonzalez, a Puerto Rican immigrant. When police attempt to apprehend Willie in his apartment, he insists he was paid by someone to attack Mac, but does not name them. In a panic, Willie attempts to flee out of the fire escape, and is shot to death by an officer.

The same night, Virna accompanies Larry to a stand-up comedy show at the Comic Strip, where Muriel has agreed to stop by after work. During the show, Virna is summoned by a waitress to take a phone call—the caller, who identifies himself as the killer, informs Virna that Muriel is handcuffed to a truck outside the club, and is about to be crushed to death. When she attempts to save Muriel outside, Virna is attacked by the killer, who attempts to run her over with his car. During the altercation, Muriel arrives at the club by taxi, and finds a traumatized Virna.

Following the attack, Virna is brought onto Mac's television show to recount her brush with the killer. On air, Virna goes into a trancelike state and begins drawing a portrait of handcuffed hands; simultaneously, Muriel is attacked in her car by the killer, who handcuffs her to the steering wheel and binds her legs before weighting down the accelerator pedal. Unable to control the car with her bound hands, Muriel crashes through an industrial building and into the river, where she drowns.

For her safety, Virna goes to stay with Mac, while Larry attempts to unravel Virna's drawings in an attempt to uncover the killer's identity. In one of the drawings, Larry notices an ornate crab-like figure, which resembles a glass figurine Paul has in his house. Virna has a vivid vision of Elizabeth's murder, revealing the truth: She was asphyxiated during a sadomasochistic group sex session in which Mac, along with three other men, bound, gagged, and raped her; the three other men are the same three male murder victims. A terrified Virna manages to flee Mac's apartment but is pursued by him to the rooftop, where he strangles her unconscious. Larry arrives and the two men get into a violent fight, culminating in Mac falling over the edge of the building, gripping onto Larry's hands. Larry pauses momentarily before letting Mac fall to his death.

Virna regains consciousness, and police descend on the building. Outside, as a flurry of reporters and authorities surround the building, Larry and Virna depart together.

== Cast ==
- Perry King as Paul 'Mac' McCormack
- Elizabeth Kemp as Virna Nightbourne
- Norman Parker as Det. Larry Weeks
- Kenneth McMillan as Det. Cullum
- Jon Polito as Det. Sporaco
- Joe Morton as Det. Rich
- Barbara Quinn as Muriel Watson
- Antone Pagán as Willie Gonzalez
- Thomas DeCarlo as Teddy Gallagher
- Lou Bedford as Werner Armstrong
- David Ramsey as Burt Johnson
- Tom Stechschulte as Jim Dearden
- Louisa Flaningam as Leanna
- Olivia Negron as Betty Mercer
- Steve Beauchamp as Harvey Dean
- Robert Kerman as Medical Examiner

== Production ==
Principal photography took place in New York City in 1981.

== Release ==
The Clairvoyant was originally purchased by Twentieth Century Fox in 1982, but ultimately did not distribute the film. It did receive a limited theatrical release, opening in Muskegon, Michigan on August 12, 1983, through Jensen Farley Pictures. It also received a theatrical release in France.

=== Home media ===
The film was released in the United States in 1985 on home video by CBS/Fox under the alternative title The Killing Hour, and was later released on DVD in a never-before-seen director's cut by Anchor Bay Entertainment in 2000. The DVD was reissued by Blue Underground under the alternate title The Killing Hour on May 20, 2008.

== Reception ==
=== Critical response ===
Film critic John Kenneth Muir praised the film as a "surprisingly solid suspense film with some elaborate horror sequences," and compared it favorably to The Eyes of Laura Mars (1977).

== Sources ==
- Muir, John Kenneth (2010). Horror Films of the 1980s. Vol. 2. Jefferson, North Carolina: McFarland. ISBN 978-0-786-45501-0.
- Pecchia, David (1991). Cinematographers, Production Designers, Costume Designers and Film Editors Guide (Third ed.). Beverly Hills, California: Lone Eagle. ISBN 978-0-943-72843-8.
