= Mark Peskanov =

Violinist

Mark Peskanov (born in Odesa, Ukraine – then part of the USSR) is an American virtuoso violinist, known as a soloist, chamber musician, composer, conductor, and concert presenter.

== Biography ==
Peskanov began playing the piano at age three, and the violin at seven. He received early musical training at the Stolyarsky school. In 1973, at the age of fifteen, he emigrated to the United States, where he attended the Aspen Music Festival and the Juilliard School. Upon his recital debut at Carnegie Hall, The New York Times declared, "Mark Peskanov is a tremendous young violinist and his Friday evening concert at Carnegie Hall was a triumph.... He has it all—technique, temperament, and taste." Since 2005, Peskanov has been president, executive and artistic director of Bargemusic. He is the brother of composer and pianist Alexander Peskanov.

== Premieres ==
Peskanov premiered the John Williams Concerto with the St. Louis Symphony in 1981 and the Stanley Wolfe Concerto (written for Peskanov) with the New York Philharmonic in 1989.

== Honors ==
Peskanov is the recipient of the Avery Fischer Career Grant and Carnegie Hall’s first Isaac Stern Award. He debuted with the Philadelphia Orchestra as the first recipient of the Frederick R. Mann Memorial prize. Peskanov performed for the inaugurations of Tokyo’s Suntory Hall in 1986 and Weill Recital Hall in 1987.
