= Kay Armatage =

Canadian filmmaker

- Born: 1943 (age 82–83); Saskatchewan, Canada
- Education: Queen's University at Kingston (B.A.); University of Toronto (M.A., Ph.D.)
- Known for: Filmmaking, writing

Kay Armatage (born 1943) is a Canadian filmmaker, former programmer at the Toronto International Film Festival (TIFF), and professor emeritus at the University of Toronto's Cinema Studies Institute and Women & Gender Studies Institute.

Born in Saskatchewan, she received a B.A. in English literature from Queen's University at Kingston in Ontario. Armatage now lives in Toronto.

During her time as an international programmer at TIFF, Armatage worked to introduce audiences to female filmmakers and risk-taking films. In her filmmaking work, Armatage makes feminist pieces that are realist and experimental in form, usually documentaries. Armatage makes observational films that speak to women's issues and challenge conventional filmmaking.

== Career ==
Kay Armatage was an international programmer for the Toronto International Film Festival from 1982 to 2004, participating in a total of 23 editions of the festival. She has been praised for defending Catherine Breillat’s Fat Girl (2001) against censorship when the board wanted to cut scenes from the film for the festival. Armatage has often argued for gender equality in the filmmaking world. Armatage was on the board of directors of Women in View, an advocacy group for gender and diversity in Canadian media.

Kay Armatage is also a professor emeritus at the Cinema Studies Institute and the Women & Gender Studies Institute at the University of Toronto. She has written scholarly work including pieces such as The Girl From God’s Country: Nell Shipman and Silent Cinema, and co-edited Gendering the Nation: Canadian Women’s Cinema.

== Filmmaking ==
As a filmmaker, Armatage is known for her documentaries that approach women’s issues, according to critic Cameron Bailey's writing on Armatage's film Artist on Fire (1987). Armatage's films have broached subjects such as abortion in Speakbody (1979) ad objectification and economy in Striptease (1980), and challenge documentary conventions. Her films also attempt to uphold the principles of feminist filmmaking through "flexibility of roles, collaboration and equality of participation," according to Armatage's own writing.

Kay Armatage's first film was a short,Jill Johnston: October 1975 (1977), which she directed alongside Lydia Wazana. The film is a documentary which follows American author Jill Johnston during one week of interviews in Toronto. The film's first showing was at the University of Toronto's Innis College. Following the end of the film screening, Johnston stood onstage to announce that there was a conflict of interest between herself and the filmmakers. She disagreed with how the film portrayed her and believed that the image it created would harm her aspirations as a serious writer. As a result, Johnston refused to sign a release for its distribution outside of Canada.

Armatage first two short films, Jill Johnston: October 1975 (1977) and Gertrude and Alice in Passing (1978), are recognized as some of the first Canadian independent films to point to the political relevance of lesbian history and culture. Striptease (1980) has been commended for its validation of sex workers by respecting their subject-generated performances.

Armatage's films have been shown in art galleries and film festivals such as the Art Gallery of Ontario and the Chicago, Toronto, and Edinburgh film festivals. Her film Artist on Fire (1987) received a special citation for excellence in documentary filmmaking from the jury for the Toronto International Film Festival Award for Best Canadian Film at the 1987 Toronto International Film Festival.

== Filmography ==
Year	Title	Contribution	Notes
1977	Jill Johnston: October 1975	Director, producer	Short; co-director with Lydia Wazana
1980	Striptease	Director	Short
1980	Speak Body	Director	Short
1983	Storytelling	Director	
1987	Artist on Fire	Director	Documentary
2015	He Hated Pigeons	Associate producer	
