= Ride Me (film) =

- Directed by: Bashar Shbib
- Written by: David Cohen; Bashar Shbib
- Produced by: David Cohen; Etienne Duval; Richard Goudreau; Bashar Shbib
- Starring: Frederick Duval; Robyn Rosenfeld; Christina Beck
- Cinematography: Marc André Berthiaume
- Edited by: Meiyan Chan; Florence Moureaux
- Music by: Jean-François Fabiano
- Release date: 1994
- Countries: United States; Canada
- Language: English

Ride Me is a 1994 romantic comedy directed by Bashir Shbib. The film is set in Las Vegas.
