= Bashar Shbib =

- Born: June 25, 1959 (age 67); Damascus, Syria
- Education: Concordia University
- Occupations: Film director, producer, actor, screenwriter
- Years active: 1983–present
- Children: 3

Bashar Shbib (born June 25, 1959) is a Canadian independent film director and producer. He started making independent films in Montreal the 1980s and became one of the most prolific independent filmmakers in Canada with over 30 films to his credit.

In the early 1990s, Shbib moved Los Angeles and directed his most successful films to date; Julia Has Two Lovers (1990) starring David Duchovny.

== Biography ==
Bashar Shbib was born in Damascus, Syria to a Syrian father and a German mother. He emigrated to Canada with his parents and two brothers at an early age. He attended McGill University in Microbiology and Concordia University, where he earned a Bachelor in Fine Arts in Film Directing.

His romantic comedies, Julia Has Two Lovers (1990) and Lana in Love (1991), were premiered at the Berlin International Film Festival panorama, the 1991 Montreal World Film Festival and the New Orleans Film Festival. Another of his comedies, Love $ Greed (1991), was in competition at the 1991 Montreal World Film Festival. Crack Me Up (1991), Ride Me (1992), and Draghoula (1994) soon followed. Shbib's recent release(s), The Senses (five feature films), has been aired on Radio Canada and several television networks worldwide. Shbib has also created less commercial works such as Evixion (1986) and Clair obscur or The Stork (1988).

In 2002, Shbib was hired to design and realize the landscaping in and around the John Sowden House in Los Angeles.

In 2013 he released the documentary film The Search for Evangeline, about his failed efforts to track down a copy of the historically significant 1914 film Evangeline.

== Filmography ==
- 1983 : Or d'Ur (Short)
- 1983 : Betsy (Short)
- 1983 : Amour Impossible (Short)
- 1984 : Memoirs
- 1985 : Cazalla de la sierra (Short)
- 1986 : Evixion
- 1987 : Seductio
- 1988 : Clair obscur
- 1990 : 15 Ugly Sisters
- 1991 : Julia Has Two Lovers
- 1991 : Love $ Greed
- 1991 : Crack me up
- 1992 : Lana in Love
- 1994 : Ride Me
- 1995 : La mule et les émeraudes
- 1995 : Bashar Shbib's Draghoula
- 1997 : Hot Sauce
- 1997 : Taxi to L.A.
- 1997 : The Perfumer
- 1997 : Strictly Spanking
- 1997 : Panic
- 1999 : The Kiss
- 2005 : Silent Men
