= Daphna Kastner =

Canadian actress

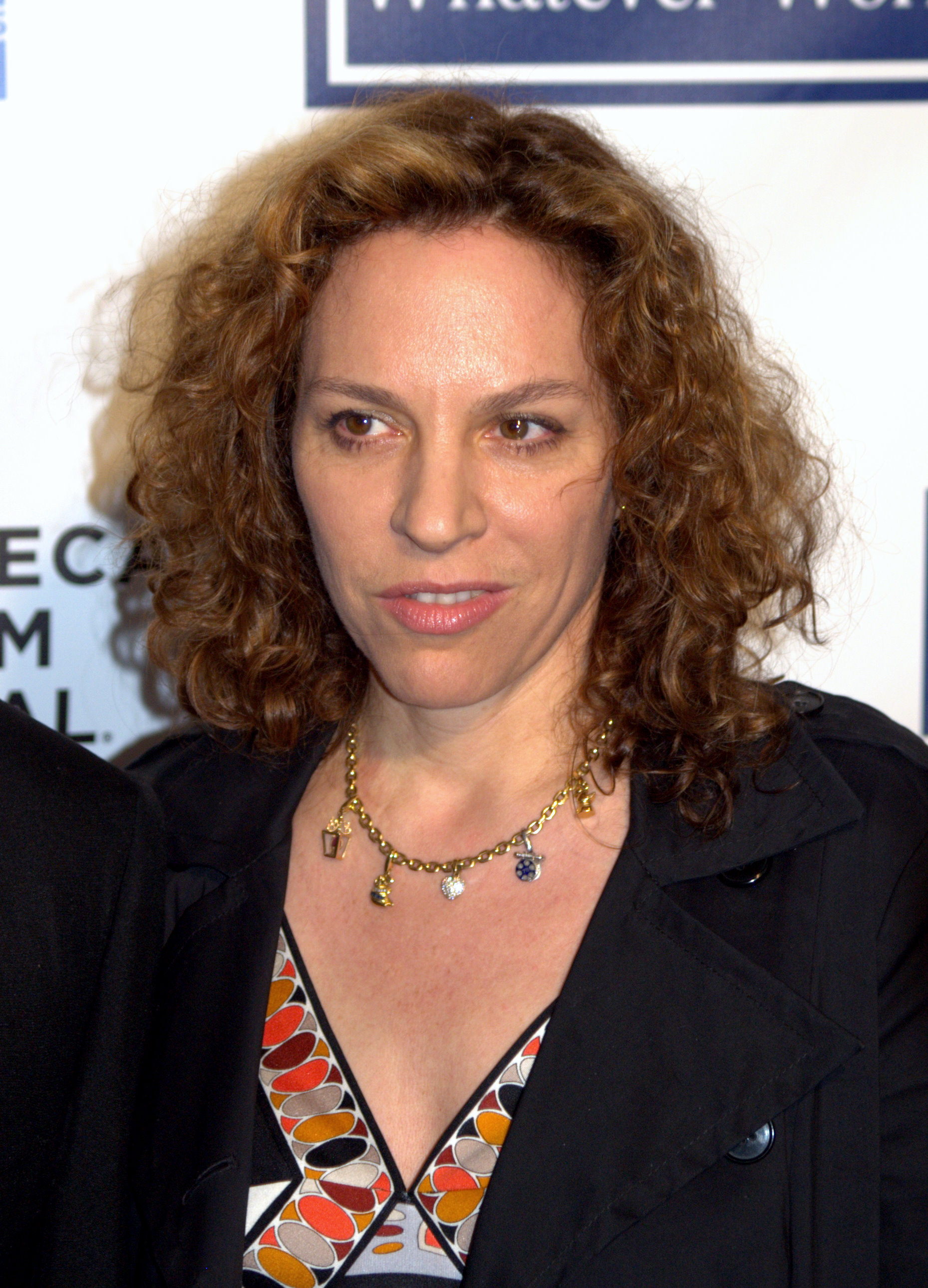
- Kastner at the 2009 premiere of Whatever Works
- Born: April 17, 1961 (age 65); Montreal, Quebec, Canada
- Occupations: Actress, screenwriter, film director
- Years active: 1983–present
- Spouse: Harvey Keitel (m. 2001)
- Children: 1

Daphna Kastner (born April 17, 1961) is a Canadian film and television actress, screenwriter, and film director. She is married to American actor Harvey Keitel.

== Personal life ==
She and Harvey Keitel secretly married in Jerusalem, while attending the Haifa International Film Festival. They have a son, named Roman.

== Selected filmography ==
- 1983 The Lonely Lady
- 1986 Evixion
- 1989 Girlfriend from Hell
- 1990 Eating
- 1991 Crack Me Up
- 1991 Julia Has Two Lovers
- 1991 Lana in Love
- 1992 Venice/Venice
- 1995 French Exit
- 1996 Kiss & Tell
- 1998 Spanish Fly
- 2000 Timecode
- 2001 Eden
- 2007 My Sexiest Year
