= List of Canadian films of 1985 =

This is a list of Canadian films which were released in 1985:

| Title | Director | Cast | Genre | Notes |
|---|---|---|---|---|
| The Alley Cat (Le Matou) | Jean Beaudin | Serge Dupire, Monique Spaziani, Jean Carmet, Julien Guiomar | Drama | Based on the novel by Yves Beauchemin; Genie Award - Musical Score |
| Anne of Green Gables | Kevin Sullivan | Megan Follows, Colleen Dewhurst, Richard Farnsworth, Patricia Hamilton, Schuyler Grant, Jackie Burroughs | CBC-TV miniseries | Based on the book by Lucy Maud Montgomery. When the two-part miniseries was broadcast in 1985, it attracted the largest single audience for a CBC-TV drama in the history of the network. |
| Artie Shaw: Time Is All You've Got | Brigitte Berman | Artie Shaw | Documentary | Academy Award for Feature Documentary |
| Bayo | Mort Ransen | Ed McNamara, Hugh Webster | Drama | |
| The Big Snit | Richard Condie | | National Film Board animated short | Oscar nominee; Genie Award – Animated Short |
| The Blue Man | George Mihalka | | Horror | |
| Breaking All the Rules | James Orr | | Comedy | |
| Caffè Italia, Montréal | Paul Tana | Tony Nardi, Pierre Curzi | Docudrama | |
| Canada's Sweetheart: The Saga of Hal C. Banks | Donald Brittain | Maury Chaykin, R.H. Thomson, Gary Reineke, Sean McCann, Colin Fox | Docudrama | Toronto Festival of Festivals - Best Canadian Feature |
| The Canadian Conspiracy | Robert Boyd | | Mockumentary | |
| The Care Bears Movie | Arna Selznick | voices Mickey Rooney, Jackie Burroughs, Harry Dean Stanton | Animation | Golden Reel for top box office |
| The Choice of a People (Le Choix d'un peuple) | Hugues Mignault | | Documentary | |
| Crime Wave | John Paizs | John Paizs, Eva Kovacs, Neal Lawrie | Crime drama | Released on video as The Big Crime Wave |
| The Dame in Colour (La Dame en couleurs) | Claude Jutra | Guillaume Lemay-Thivierge, Ariane Frédérique | Drama | Claude Jutra's final film; entered into the 14th Moscow International Film Festival |
| The Dead Father | Guy Maddin | | Short drama | |
| Def-Con 4 | Paul Donovan | | Science fiction | |
| Eastern Avenue | Peter Mettler | | | |
| Final Offer | Sturla Gunnarsson, Robert Collison | | Documentary | |
| Get a Job | Brad Caslor | | Animated short | Genie Award - Animated Short |
| Heavenly Bodies | Lawrence Dane | | Drama | |
| Here Come the Littles | Bernard Deyriès | | Animated | International coproduction |
| Hold-Up | Alexandre Arcady | Jean-Paul Belmondo, Guy Marchand, Jean-Pierre Marielle, Kim Cattrall | | Canada-France co-production; later remade as Quick Change with Bill Murray and Geena Davis. |
| Honeymoon (Lune de miel) | Patrick Jamain | | Thriller | |
| Joshua Then and Now | Ted Kotcheff | James Woods, Gabrielle Lazure, Michael Sarrazin, Alan Arkin, Linda Sorenson | Drama | Screenplay by Mordechai Richler based on his own novel |
| The Last Polka | John Blanchard | John Candy, Eugene Levy | Mockumentary | |
| Making Overtures: The Story of a Community Orchestra | Larry Weinstein | | Documentary | |
| Mortimer Griffin and Shalinsky | Mort Ransen | | Documentary | |
| My American Cousin | Sandy Wilson | Margaret Langrick, John Wildman, Richard Donat, Camille Henderson | Coming-of-age drama | |
| 90 Days | Giles Walker | Sam Grana, Stefan Wodoslawsky, Christine Pak, Fernanda Tavares | Comedy | |
| Night Magic | Lewis Furey | Nick Mancuso, Carole Laure, Stéphane Audran, Jean Carmet, Frank Augustyn | Fantasy musical | Music by Lewis Furey and Leonard Cohen; Genie Award - Song |
| No Sad Songs | Nik Sheehan | Jim Black | Documentary | World's first feature documentary about HIV/AIDS |
| One Magic Christmas | Phillip Borsos | Mary Steenburgen, Harry Dean Stanton, Elizabeth Harnois, Gary Basaraba, Arthur Hill, Wayne Robson | Holiday drama | Genie Awards – Overall Sound, Sound Editing; made with U.S. financing |
| Overnight | Jack Darcus | Gale Garnett, Alan Scarfe | Drama | |
| Pale Face (Visage pâle) | Claude Gagnon | Luc Matte, Allison Odjig, Guy Thauvette, Gilbert Sicotte | Drama | |
| The Peanut Butter Solution | Michael Rubbo | Mathew MacKay, Siluck Saysanasy, Alison Podbrey, Michael Hogan | Children's film | Tales for All series |
| Porky's Revenge! | James Komack | Dan Monahan, Wyatt Knight, Mark Herrier, Tony Ganios, Kaki Hunter | Teen comedy | Made with U.S. financing |
| Ranch: The Alan Wood Ranch Project | Steven DeNure, Chris Lowry | Alan Wood | Documentary | |
| Samuel Lount | Laurence Keane | R. H. Thomson, Linda Griffiths, Booth Savage | Historical drama | |
| Screwballs II | Rafal Zielinski | | Sex comedy | |
| Summer Rain (Pluie d'été) | François Dauteuil | Paul Hébert, Linda Sorgini, Geneviève Rioux, Martin Faucher | Short drama | |
| Sylvia | Michel Murray | | Animated short | |
| Tears Are Not Enough | John Zaritsky | Northern Lights | Documentary | |
| Le Temps des bouffons | Pierre Falardeau | | Documentary | |
| Terminal Choice | Sheldon Larry | Joe Spano, Diane Venora, David McCallum, Ellen Barkin | Thriller | |
| Tony de Peltrie | Pierre Lachapelle, Philippe Bergeron, Pierre Robidoux, Daniel Langlois | | Animated | |
| The War Boy | Allan Eastman | Helen Shaver, Kenneth Welsh, Jason Hopley | War drama film | Canadian-Yugoslav co-production |
| Working Title | Ken Scott, Fred Jones | | Short comedy, mockumentary | |

== See also ==
- 1985 in Canada
- 1985 in Canadian television
