= 8th Gemini Awards =

1994 awards for Canadian television

- Date: March 6, 1994
- Venue: Metro Toronto Convention Centre
- Hosted by: Albert Schultz, Valerie Pringle

Television/radio coverage
- Network: CBC Television

The Academy of Canadian Cinema & Television's 8th Gemini Awards were held on March 6, 1994, to honour achievements in Canadian television. The awards show, which was hosted by Albert Schultz and Valerie Pringle, took place at the Metro Toronto Convention Centre and was broadcast on CBC Television.

== Best Dramatic Series ==
- E.N.G. – Atlantis Communications. Producers: Jennifer Black, Greg Copeland, Robert Lantos
- Beyond Reality – Paragon Entertainment. Producers: Jon Slan, Richard Borchiver, Janet Cuddy
- Forever Knight – Paragon Entertainment. Producers: Jon Slan, James D. Parriott, Richard Borchiver, Lionel E. Siegel, Nicholas Gray
- North of 60 – (Seven24 Films). Producers: Tom Cox, Doug MacLeod, Robert Lantos, Barbara Samuels, Wayne Grigsby
- Street Legal – Canadian Broadcasting Corporation. Producers: Nicholas Rose, Duncan Lamb, Brenda Greenberg

== Best Short Dramatic Program ==
- Letter from Francis – Atlantis Films, Cabiria Productions. Producers: Daphne Ballon, Jane Thompson
- Kurt Vonnegut's Monkey House – More Stately Mansions – Atlantis Films, South Pacific Pictures. Producers: Michael MacMillan, Chris Bailey, Jonathan Goodwill
- Scales of Justice: "Regina v Coffin" – Canadian Broadcasting Corporation. Producer: George Jonas
- The Hidden Room – While She Was Out – Hidden Room Productions. Producers: David Perlmutter, Lewis Chesler, Tab Baird, Adam Haight
- The Bellringer – Firehorse Film Productions. Producer: Brenda Sherwood

== Best TV Movie ==
- The Diviners – Atlantis Films, Credo Group. Producers: Kim Todd, Derek Mazur, Bill Gray, Peter Sussman
- I'll Never Get to Heaven – Canadian Broadcasting Corporation. Producer: Flora Macdonald
- Liar, Liar – Canadian Broadcasting Corporation. Producer Phil Savath
- Gross Misconduct: The Life of Brian Spencer – Canadian Broadcasting Corporation. Producer: Alan Burke
- Adrift – Atlantis Films. Producers: Jonathan Goodwill, Peter Sussman

== Best Music Program or Series ==
- The Holly Cole Trio – My Foolish Heart – Cambium Film & Video Productions. Producers: Bruce Glawson, Arnie Zipursky
- Juno Awards of 1993 – Canadian Broadcasting Corporation. Producers: John Brunton, Joan Tosoni
- Michael Burgess at Massey Hall – Canadian Broadcasting Corporation. Producer: Lynn Harvey

== Best Comedy Program or Series ==
- The Kids in the Hall – Broadway Video, Canadian Broadcasting Corporation. Producers: John Blanchard, Lorne Michaels, Jeffrey Berman, Cindy Park, Joe Forristal
- Maniac Mansion – Atlantis Films. Producers: Jamie Paul Rock, Eugene Levy, Barry Jossen, Peter Sussman, Seaton McLean, Michael Short
- The Red Green Show – S&S Productions. Producers: Steve Smith, William Johnston, Ronald Lillie

== Donald Brittain Award for Best Documentary Program ==
- Donald Brittain Filmmaker – National Film Board of Canada. Producer: Adam Symansky
- Adrienne Clarkson Presents – Artemisia – Canadian Broadcasting Corporation. Producer: Adrienne Clarkson
- The Nature of Things – Trading Futures – Canadian Broadcasting Corporation. Producer: Michael Poole
- Man Alive – Held Hostage – Canadian Broadcasting Corporation. Producer: Halya Kuchmij
- the fifth estate – Canadian Broadcasting Corporation. Producer: Susan Teskey

== Best Documentary Series ==
- Acts of War – Screenlife. Producers: Michael Maclear, David Kirk
- The Nature of Things with David Suzuki – Canadian Broadcasting Corporation. Producer: James Murray
- Man Alive – Canadian Broadcasting Corporation. Producer: Louise Lore

== Best Dramatic Mini-Series ==
- The Boys of St. Vincent – Les Productions Tele-Action, National Film Board of Canada. Producers: Claudio Luca, Sam Grana
- Woman on the Run: The Lawrencia Bembenek Story – Alliance Communications. Producers: Robert Lantos, Michael Weisbarth, Ian McDougall

== Best Performing Arts Program or Series or Arts Documentary Program or Series ==
- My War Years: Arnold Schoenberg – Rhombus Media. Producers: Larry Weinstein, Niv Fichman
- Adrienne Clarkson Presents – Ronnie Burkett: Hands On – Canadian Broadcasting Corporation. Producer: Patricia Smith-Strom
- Adrienne Clarkson Presents – Famous People Players – Canadian Broadcasting Corporation. Producer: Robert Sherrin
- The Tin Soldier – Sound Venture Productions. Producer: Neil Bregman

== Best Variety Program or Series ==
- The Trial of Red Riding Hood – Canadian Broadcasting Corporation, Bernard Rothman Productions. Producer: Bernard Rothman
- Royal Canadian Air Farce – 1992 Year of the Farce – Canadian Broadcasting Corporation. Producers: Brian Robertson, Ralph Mellanby, Roger Abbott, Don Ferguson
- Anne Murray in Nova Scotia – Canadian Broadcasting Corporation, Balmur Entertainment. Producers: Sandra Faire, Leonard T. Rambeau
- True North Concert '93 – Canadian Broadcasting Corporation. Producer: Keith MacNeill

== Best Information Program or Series ==
- Marketplace – Canadian Broadcasting Corporation. Producers: Sig Gerber, Paul Moore
- Contact with Hana Gartner – Canadian Broadcasting Corporation. Producers: Alan Burke, Robin Taylor, Anne Bayin, Larry Zolf
- the fifth estate – Canadian Broadcasting Corporation. Producers: Kelly Crichton, David Studer
- Venture – Canadian Broadcasting Corporation. Producer: Duncan McEwan
- W5 With Eric Malling – CTV Television Network. Producer: Peter Rehak

== Best Information Segment ==
- CBC Prime Time News – The Somalia Affair – Canadian Broadcasting Corporation. Producers: Robin Benger, Brian Stewart
- W5 With Eric Malling – Welfare – CTV Television Network. Producers: Andrea Dinnick, Michael Lavoie
- CBC Prime Time News – Every Move You Make – Canadian Broadcasting Corporation. Producers: Daniel Gelfant, Leslie MacKinnon
- CBC News Manitoba – A Tale of Two Towns – CBC Manitoba. Producers: Ross Rutherford, Cecil Rosner
- The Spirit of the Game – CBC Manitoba. Producers: Mark Lee, Andy Blicq

== Best Lifestyle Series ==
- MediaTelevision – Citytv. Producers: Moses Znaimer, Marcia Martin, Reid Willis
- Imprint – TVOntario. Producers: Stanford Lipsey, Leanna Crouch
- Life Lines – TVOntario. Producers: David Way, Mary Pattenden, Wally Longul
- Prisoners of Gravity – TVOntario. Producer: Gregg Thurlbeck
- On the Road Again – CBC. Producer: Paul Harrington
- LIFE: The Program – CBC. Producer: Duncan McEwan

== Best Animated Program or Series ==
- Dog City – Nelvana, Jim Henson Productions. Producers: Michael Hirsh, Patrick Loubert, Clive A. Smith
- A Bunch of Munsch – Cinar. Producers: Ronald A. Weinberg, Micheline Charest

== Best Youth Program or Series ==
- Street Cents – Canadian Broadcasting Corporation. Producers: John Nowlan, Jonathan Finkelstein, Barbara Kennedy
- Minoru: Memory of Exile – National Film Board of Canada. Producer: Bill Pettigrew
- The Odyssey – Water Street Pictures. Producer: Michael Chechik
- Are You Afraid of the Dark? – Cinar, YTV. Producer: Ronald A. Weinberg
- Spirit Rider – OWL/TV, Credo Group. Producers: Wayne Arron, Derek Mazur

== Best Children's Program or Series ==
- Lamb Chop's Play-Along – Paragon Entertainment. Producers: Jon Slan, Richard Borchiver, Bernard Rothman
- Join In! – Play Ball – TVOntario. Producer: Jed MacKay
- The Big Comfy Couch – Radical Sheep Productions. Producers: Cheryl Wagner, Robert Mills
- Under the Umbrella Tree Special: Baseball Fever – Noreen Young Productions. Producer: Noreen Young

== Best Sports Program or Series ==
- The Spirit of the Game – CBC Manitoba. Producers: Andy Blicq, Noah Erenberg
- The Hat Trick – J.T.D. Video Productions. Producer: Bob Cole
- Pumped! – Insight Productions. Producers: John Brunton, Dale Burshtein
- Coach's Corner – Canadian Broadcasting Corporation. Producers: Ron G. Harrison, Larry Isaac, Mark Askin
- Molson Hockey Night in Canada – Canadian Broadcasting Corporation. Producers: Ron G. Harrison, Mark Askin, Larry Isaac, Ed Milliken

== Best Special Event Coverage ==
- The Canadian Open – Canadian Television Network. Producers: Doug Beeforth, John Shannon
- 1993 NHL Entry Draft – TSN. Producer: Gord Cutler
- CTV News – Leadership '93 – Canadian Television Network. Producers: Eric Morrison, Fiona Conway
- 1993 Progressive Conservative Leadership Convention – Canadian Broadcasting Corporation. Producers: Arnold Amber, Tom Kavanagh, Elly Alboim, Fred Parker

== Best Direction in a Dramatic Program or Mini-Series ==
- John N. Smith – The Boys of St. Vincent (Les Productions Tele-Action/NFB)
- Sturla Gunnarsson – Scales of Justice: "Regina v Truscott" (CBC)
- Jorge Montesi – Liar, Liar (CBC)
- Paul Cowan – Double or Nothing: The Rise and Fall of Robert Campeau (NFB)
- Eric Till – Lifeline to Victory (Primedia Productions)

== Best Direction in a Dramatic or Comedy Series ==
- Jerry Ciccoritti – Catwalk – Here Today (Cat Run Productions)
- George Bloomfield – North of 60 – Sisters of Mercy (Seven24 Films)
- Jorge Montesi – Catwalk – Sex, Lies and Rock N' Roll
- Stacey Curtis – North of 60 – Freeze-Out (Seven24 Films)
- Allan King – By Way of the Stars – Arrival at Niagara Falls (Sullivan Entertainment)
- Don McBrearty – The Odyssey – A Place Called Nowhere (Water Street Pictures)

== Best Direction in a Variety or Performing Arts Program or Series ==
- Ron Meraska – Michael Burgess at Massey Hall (CBC)
- Michael McNamara – The Holly Cole Trio – My Foolish Heart (Cambium Film & Video Productions)
- Larry Weinstein – My War Years: Arnold Schoenberg (Rhombus Media)
- David Langer – The Tin Soldier (Sound Venture Productions)
- Eric Till – The Trial of Red Riding Hood (CBC/Bernard Rothman Productions)

== Best Direction in an Information or Documentary Program or Series ==
- John Zaritsky – Frontline: An Appointment With Death (PBS)
- Kent Martin – Donald Brittain Filmmaker (National Film Board of Canada)
- Julian Sher – the fifth estate – Crimes Against Humanity (CBC)
- Vladimir Bondarenko – Speaking of Courage (Condor Productions)
- Denis Blaquière, Gisèle Benoit – In the Company of Moose (Films Franc-Sud)

== Best Writing in a Dramatic Mini-Series ==
- Des Walsh, John N. Smith, Sam Grana – The Boys of St. Vincent (Les Productions Tele-Action/NFB)
- Kathleen M. Turner – I'll Never Get to Heaven (CBC)
- Nancy Isaak – Liar, Liar (CBC)
- Paul Gross – Gross Misconduct: The Life of Brian Spencer (CBC)
- Anna Sandor, William Gough – Family of Strangers (Atlantis Communications)

== Best Writing in a Dramatic Series ==
- Rebecca Schechter – North of 60 – Sisters of Mercy (Seven24 Films)
- Dave Cole – E.N.G. – Another Pretty Face (Atlantis Communications)
- Paul Vitols, Warren Easton – The Odyssey – A Place Called Nowhere (Water Street Pictures)
- Marlene Matthews – Road to Avonlea – Home Movie (Sullivan Entertainment)
- Hart Hanson – Ready or Not – Origins of Man (Insight Productions)

== Best Writing in a Comedy or Variety Program or Series ==
- Mary Walsh, Cathy Jones, Tommy Sexton, Greg Malone – Codco – Lil and Buster (Salter Street Films)
- Michael Short – Maniac Mansion – Freddie Had a Little Lamb (Atlantis Films)
- Steve Smith, Rick Green – The Red Green Show – Car Pool (S&S Productions)
- John Morgan, Gord Holtam, Rick Olsen – Royal Canadian Air Farce – 1992 Year of the Farce (CBC)
- Thomas Wallner, Larry Weinstein – My War Years: Arnold Schoenberg (Rhombus Media)

== Best Writing in an Information/Documentary Program or Series ==
- Michael Maclear – Acts of War – A Very Personal War (Screenlife)
- Amanda McConnell – The Nature of Things – Trading Futures – CBC)
- Linden MacIntyre – the fifth estate – Odd Man Out (CBC)
- Joe Schlesinger – CBC Prime Time News – The Mulroney Years (CBC)
- Ted Remerowski – God's Dominion – In the Name of the Father (God's Dominion Productions)

== Best Performance by an Actor in a Leading Role in a Dramatic Program or Mini-Series ==
- Henry Czerny – The Boys of St. Vincent (Les Productions Tele-Action/NFB)
- Tom Jackson – The Diviners (Atlantis Films, Credo Group)
- Art Hindle – Liar, Liar (CBC)
- Daniel Kash – Gross Misconduct: The Life of Brian Spencer (CBC)
- Ron White – Manic (Fleeting Glimpse Productions)

== Best Performance by an Actress in a Leading Role in a Dramatic Program or Mini-Series ==
- Kelly Rowan – Adrift (Atlantis Films)
- Julie Stewart – Letter from Francis – (Atlantis Films/Cabiria Productions)
- Sonja Smits – The Diviners (Atlantis Films, Credo Group)
- Wendy Crewson – I'll Never Get to Heaven (CBC)
- Vanessa King – Liar, Liar (CBC)

== Best Performance by an Actor in a Continuing Leading Dramatic Role ==
- James Purcell – Counterstrike – Going Home (Alliance Communications)
- C. David Johnson – Street Legal – The Rules of the Game (CBC)
- John Oliver – North of 60 – Southern Comfort (Seven24 Films)
- Eric Peterson – Street Legal – It's a Wise Child (CBC)
- Winston Rekert – Neon Rider – The Good, The Bad & Eleanor (Virtue/Rekert Productions/Atlantis Films)

== Best Performance by an Actress in a Continuing Leading Dramatic Role ==
- Jackie Burroughs – Road to Avonlea – Hearts and Flowers (Sullivan Entertainment)
- Sophie Michaud – Counterstrike – Behind Bars (Alliance Communications)
- Catherine Disher – Forever Knight (Paragon Entertainment)
- Tina Keeper – North of 60 – Sisters of Mercy (Seven24 Films)
- Sarah Polley, Road to Avonlea – Moving On (Sullivan Entertainment)

== Best Guest Performance in a Series by an Actor or Actress ==
- Phil Granger – Neon Rider – Saint Walk (Virtue/Rekert Productions/Atlantis Films)
- Diana Leblanc – North of 60 – Sisters of Mercy (Seven24 Films)
- Barbara Tyson – North of 60 – The Reunion (Seven24 Films)
- Graham Greene – North of 60 – The Art of the Deal (Seven24 Films)
- Gordon Clapp – Street Legal – The Rules of the Game (CBC)
- Robert Haley – Street Legal – Thicker Than Water (CBC)

== Best Performance by an Actor in a Supporting Role ==
- Wayne Robson – The Diviners (Atlantis Films/Credo Group)
- Peter MacNeill – Gross Misconduct: The Life of Brian Spencer (CBC)
- Brian Dooley – The Boys of St. Vincent (Les Productions Tele-Action/NFB)
- Alex McArthur – Woman on the Run: The Lawrencia Bembenek Story (Alliance Communications)
- R. H. Thomson – Road to Avonlea – Home Movie (Sullivan Entertainment)

== Best Performance by an Actress in a Supporting Role ==
- Lise Roy – The Boys of St. Vincent (Les Productions Tele-Action/NFB)
- Julie Khaner – Street Legal – It's a Wise Child (CBC)
- Susan Wright – I'll Never Get to Heaven (CBC)
- Peggy McCay – Woman on the Run: The Lawrencia Bembenek Story (Alliance Communications)
- Jackie Richardson – Catwalk – Here Today (Cat Run Productions)
- Ashleigh Aston Moore – Family of Strangers (Atlantis Communications)

== Best Performance in a Comedy Program or Series ==
- Mary Walsh, Cathy Jones, Tommy Sexton, Greg Malone – Codco – Lil and Buster (Salter Street Films)
- Steve Smith – The Red Green Show (S&S Productions)
- Roger Abbott, Luba Goy, John Morgan, Don Ferguson – Royal Canadian Air Farce – 1992 Year of the Farce (CBC)
- Scott Thompson, Mark McKinney, Kevin McDonald, Bruce McCulloch, Dave Foley, The Kids in the Hall (Broadway Video/CBC)

== Best Performance in a Variety Program or Series ==
- Jinny Jacinto, Laurence Racine Choiniere, Nadine Louis-Binette, Isabelle Chasse – The 4th Annual YTV Achievement Awards (GRC Productions/YTV)
- Celine Dion – Juno Awards of 1993 (CBC)
- Rita MacNeil – 1993 Canadian Country Music Awards (CTV)
- Alan Thicke – The Trial of Red Riding Hood (CBC/Bernard Rothman Productions)
- Michel Courtemanche – Just for Laughs Comedy Festival – Rita Rudner/Michel Courtemanche/Al Lubel (Les Films Rozon)

== Best Performance in a Performing Arts Program or Series ==
- Holly Cole – The Holly Cole Trio – My Foolish Heart (Cambium Film & Video Productions)
- Evelyn Hart – 1993 Governor General's Performing Arts Awards – Tribute Performance to Lois Marshall (CBC)
- Warren 'Slim' Williams – 1993 Governor General's Performing Arts Awards – Tribute Performance to Lois Marshall (CBC)

== Best Performance in a Children's or Youth Program or Series ==
- Graham Greene – The Adventures of Dudley the Dragon – Mr. Crabby Tree (Breakthrough Entertainment)
- Fred Penner – Fred Penner's Place – Swinging (CBC)
- Alyson Court – The Big Comfy Couch – Funny Faces (Radical Sheep Productions)
- Jackie Burroughs – The Adventures of Dudley the Dragon – High Flying Dragon (Breakthrough Films and Television)
- Ernie Coombs – Mr. Dressup's 25th Anniversary Special: A Blast From the Past (CBC)
- Michelle Beaudoin – Madison – The Fire Fighter (Forefront Entertainment)

== Gordon Sinclair Award for Broadcast Journalism ==
- Craig Oliver – CTV News – Question Period/Leader '93 (CTV)
- Trish Wood – the fifth estate – Crimes Against Humanity (CBC)
- Pamela Wallin – CBC Prime Time News (CBC)
- Ross Rutherford – CBC News – Dirty Tricks (CBC Manitoba)

== Best Reportage ==
- Craig Oliver – CTV News – Mulroney Resignation Scoop (CTV)
- Mark Sikstrom – CTV News – Yellowknife Grieves (CTV)
- Joy Malbon – CTV News – Racist Rally (CTV)
- Jim Munson – CTV News – Davis Inlet (CTV)

== Best Anchor or Interviewer ==
- Lloyd Robertson – CTV News – Mulroney Resignation/Leadership '93 (CTV)
- June Callwood – June Callwood's National Treasures (Contact Communications)
- Hana Gartner – Contact with Hana Gartner (CBC)
- Peter Mansbridge – CBC Prime Time News (CBC)
- Pamela Wallin – CBC Prime Time News (CBC)

== Best Host in a Lifestyle, Variety or Performing Arts Program or Series ==
- Rob Buckman – Magic or Medicine? – Encounters of a Healing Kind (Primedia Productions)
- Adrienne Clarkson – Adrienne Clarkson Presents (CBC)
- David Suzuki – The Nature of Things – CBC)
- Wayne Rostad – On the Road Again (CBC)
- Shirley Solomon – The Shirley Show – The Unknown Side of Donny Osmond (Adderley Productions)

== Best Sportscaster ==
- Ron Maclean – Hockey Night in Canada (CBC)
- Brian Williams – Molson Indy Vancouver (CBC)
- Jim Hughson – (TSN)
- Jack Donohue – Donohue's Legends (Nation's Capital Television)

== Best Photography in a Dramatic Program or Series ==
- Rene Ohashi – The Diviners (Atlantis Films/Credo Group)
- Maris Jansons – Beyond Reality (Paragon Entertainment)
- Albert J. Dunk – Forever Knight (Paragon Entertainment)
- Peter Woeste – Neon Rider – The Good, The Bad and Eleanor (Virtue/Rekert Productions/Atlantis Films)
- Miklós Lente – Ordeal in the Arctic (Atlantis Communications/Provocative Pictures)

== Best Photography in a Comedy, Variety or Performing Arts Program or Series ==
- Gil Densham – Juno Awards of 1993 (CBC)
- Dennis Jones – 1993 Canadian Country Music Awards (CTV)
- Horst Zeidler – My War Years: Arnold Schoenberg (Rhombus Media)
- Stan Plecity – True North Concert '93 (CBC North)

== Best Photography in an Information/Documentary Program or Series ==
- Mike Nolan – W5 With Eric Malling – Railraiders (CTV)
- Danny Cook – Marketplace (CBC)
- Robin Russell – For the Love of the Game – Bump and Grind (TSN)
- Raynald Benoit – In the Company of Moose (Films Franc-Sud)
- Milan Podsedly – Without Fear (Breakthrough Entertainment)

== Best News Photography ==
- Gord Danielson – CTV News – Davis Inlet (CTV)
- Louis deGuise – CBC Prime Time News – Somalia, April/93 (CBC)
- Tom Michalak – CTV News – David Milgaard's Legal Limbo (CTV)

== Best Picture Editing in a Dramatic Program or Series ==
- Werner Nold, André Corriveau – The Boys of St. Vincent (Les Productions Tele-Action/NFB)
- Dave Goard – Beyond Reality (Paragon Entertainment)
- Patrick Lussier – Adrift (Atlantis Films)
- T.C. Martin – Lifeline to Victory (Primedia Productions)
- Dean Balser – Top Cops – Challice/Williams (C.B.I. of Canada)

== Best Picture Editing in a Comedy, Variety or Performing Arts Program or Series ==
- Greg White – True North Concert '93 (CBC North
- Michael McNamara – The Holly Cole Trio – My Foolish Heart (Cambium Film & Video Productions)
- James Ho Lim – Adrienne Clarkson Presents (CBC)
- David New – My War Years: Arnold Schoenberg (Rhombus Media)
- Gregg Antworth – Codco (Salter Street Films)

== Best Picture Editing in an Information/Documentary Program or Series ==
- Deborah Palloway, Mike Feheley – Acts of War – A Famous Victory (Screenlife)
- Geoff Matheson – CBC Prime Time News – Algonquin Summer (CBC)
- Mike Earls, Christine Alevizakis – For the Love of the Game – Bump and Grind (TSN)
- Daniel Arié – In the Company of Moose (Films Franc-Sud)
- Angela Baker – Speak It! From the Heart of Black Nova Scotia (NFB)

== Best Production Design or Art Direction ==
- Perri Gorrara, Ane Christensen – I'll Never Get to Heaven (CBC)
- John Blackie – The Diviners (Atlantis Films, Credo Group)
- David Owen, Roy Kellar – Adrienne Clarkson Presents – Artemesia (CBC)
- Graeme Murray – The Odyssey – A Place Called Nowhere (Water Street Pictures)
- Arthur Herriott – Friday Night! with Ralph Benmergui – Kurt Swinghammer/Karen Magnussen/Cathy Jones/Shuffle Demons (CBC)

== Best Costume Design ==
- Charlotte Penner – The Diviners (Atlantis Films, Credo Group)
- Frances Dafoe – I'll Never Get to Heaven (CBC)
- Denis Sperdouklis – The Boys of St. Vincent (Les Productions Tele-Action/NFB)
- Mary Kerr – The Tin Soldier (Sound Venture Productions)
- Frances Dafoe – The Trial of Red Riding Hood (CBC/Bernard Rothman Productions)

== Best Sound in a Dramatic Program or Series ==
- Marcel Pothier, Serge Beauchemin, Hans Peter Strobl, Jerome Decarie, Antoine Morin – The Boys of St. Vincent (Les Productions Tele-Action/NFB)
- Michael Beard, Tom Hidderley, Michael Baskerville, Dan Sexton, Jamie Sulek – The Hidden Room – While She Was Out (Hidden Room Productions)
- Rick Ellis, Orest Sushko, Gary Daprato, Jim Rillie, Anthony Lancett – Lifeline to Victory (Primedia Productions)
- Lindsay Bucknell – Neon Rider – The Good, The Bad & Eleanor (Virtue/Rekert Productions/Atlantis Films)
- Terry Gordica, James Porteous, Kevin Howard, Steve Foster – Split Images (Paragon Entertainment)

== Best Sound in a Comedy, Variety or Performing Arts Program or Series ==
- Peter Mann, Simon Bowers, Mas Kikuta, Dave Ripka, Mike Nazarec – Juno Awards of 1993 (CBC)
- Peter Mann, Mas Kikuta, Simon Bowers, Peter Campbell, Tom Wood – Michael Burgess at Massey Hall (CBC)
- Onno Scholtze – My War Years: Arnold Schoenberg (Rhombus Media)
- Ray St. Sauveur – Romeo and Juliet (CBC)

== Best Sound in an Information/Documentary Program or Series ==
- Sebastian Salm – Visions of Carmanah (Omnifilm Entertainment)
- Sergio Penhas-Roll, James Ho Lim, Scott Chisholm – Man Alive – Held Hostage (CBC)
- David Picoski – CBC Prime Time News – Profile of An Artist: James Ehnes CBC)
- Chris Davies – CBC Prime Time News – Haiti (CBC)

== Best Original Music Score for a Program or Mini-Series ==
- John Welsman – The Bellringer (Firehorse Film Productions)
- Randolph Peters – The Diviners (Atlantis Films, Credo Group)
- Fred Mollin – Liar, Liar (CBC)
- Eric Lemoyne – Double or Nothing: The Rise and Fall of Robert Campeau (NFB)
- Ernie Tollar – The Passion of Rita Camilleri (Out Of The Blue Film Productions)

== Best Original Music Score for a Series ==
- Fred Mollin – Beyond Reality – The Passion (Paragon Entertainment)
- John Welsman – By Way of the Stars – Arrival at Niagara Falls (Sullivan Entertainment)
- Don Gillis – Road to Avonlea – Moving On (Sullivan Entertainment)
- Henri Lorieau – Bordertown – Demon Rum (Alliance Communications)
- Domenic Troiano – Secret Service – The Banker and the Belle/Imposters (Secret Vision)

== Special awards ==
- Canada Award: Marilyn A. Belec, Sylvia Hamilton, Mike Mahoney. Honored for Speak It! From the Heart of Black Nova Scotia
- Margaret Collier Award: Alex Barris
- John Drainie Award: Max Ferguson
- Earle Grey Award: Ernie Coombs
- Outstanding Technical Achievement Award: Kodak Canada's Eastman EXR200T (5273/7293) Film Stock
