= The Masculine Mystique =

- Directed by: Giles Walker; John N. Smith
- Screenplay by: John N. Smith; Giles Walker; David Wilson
- Produced by: Giles Walker; David Wilson; Andy Thomson; Robert Verrall
- Starring: Sam Grana; Stefan Wodoslawsky; Mort Ransen; Ashley Murray
- Cinematography: Andrew Kitzanuk
- Edited by: David Wilson
- Music by: Richard Gresko
- Production company: National Film Board of Canada
- Release date: 23 August 1984
- Running time: 87 minutes
- Country: Canada
- Language: English
- Budget: $489,590

The Masculine Mystique is a Canadian docufiction film directed by Giles Walker and John N. Smith and released in 1984.

The film centres on Alex (Sam Grana), Blue (Stefan Wodoslawsky), Mort (Mort Ransen) and Ashley (Ashley Murray), four men whose perspectives on the changing nature of men's sexual and romantic relationships with women in the wake of feminism are explored through both documentary "interviews" and narrative vignettes. Alex is a married father who is having an extramarital affair; Ashley is a single parent, recently separated from his wife but not ready to commit to a new relationship; Mort is a divorced man who is seeking a new relationship; Blue is a single man seeking the "perfect woman".

The film, which had a budget of $489,590 (equivalent to $1,326,579 in 2025), was the first in the National Film Board of Canada's series of "alternative dramas" in the 1980s and early 1990s, which combined dramatic and documentary film techniques. It was created and scripted through an improvisational process, with the film's characters being portrayed by National Film Board filmmakers and their family members rather than by professional actors.

The characters of Alex and Blue were subsequently spun off into the follow-up films 90 Days and The Last Straw, which explored Alex becoming a sperm donor and Blue entering a relationship with a Korean mail-order bride. 90 Days was the most commercially and critically successful of the three films, garnering several nominations at the 1986 Genie Awards. The Masculine Mystique won a Red Ribbon at the 1985 American Film and Video Festival.

== Works cited ==
- Evans, Gary (1991). In the National Interest: A Chronicle of the National Film Board of Canada from 1949 to 1989. University of Toronto Press. ISBN 0802027849.
