= Emrys Jones =

Emrys Jones may refer to:

- Emrys Jones (actor) (1915–1972), English actor
- Emrys Jones (literary scholar) (1931–2012), English academic
- Emrys Jones (geographer) (1920–2006), geographer and urban planner
- Emrys Jones (drama professor) (1905–1973), professor of drama who had worked aboard vessels in Canada's north, in his youth
