= Speak It! From the Heart of Black Nova Scotia =

- Directed by: Sylvia Hamilton
- Written by: Bob Lower; Sylvia Hamilton
- Produced by: Mike Mahoney
- Narrated by: Shingai Nyajeka
- Cinematography: Mike Mahoney
- Edited by: Angela Baker
- Distributed by: National Film Board of Canada
- Release date: 1992
- Running time: 28 minutes
- Country: Canada
- Language: English

Speak It! From the Heart of Black Nova Scotia is a 1992 documentary film by Sylvia Hamilton, focusing on a group of Black Nova Scotian students in a predominantly white high school, St. Patrick's in Halifax, Nova Scotia, who face daily reminders of racism. These students work to build pride and self-esteem through educational and cultural programs, discovering their heritage and learning ways to effect change. Produced by the National Film Board of Canada, this 28-minute documentary received the Canada Award at the 1994 Gemini Awards from the Academy of Canadian Cinema and Television, as well as the 1994 Maeda Prize from NHK.
