= Sam Grana =

Canadian film producer

Saverio "Sam" Grana
- Born: Saverio Grana; Italy
- Notable work: Train of Dreams and The Boys of St. Vincent

Saverio "Sam" Grana is a Canadian television and film producer and screenwriter, most noted for the film Train of Dreams and the television miniseries The Boys of St. Vincent.

== Career ==
For much of his career he was associated with the National Film Board of Canada, for whom he was one of the originators alongside directors Giles Walker and John N. Smith of the studio's 1980s foray into "alternative drama" docufiction filmmaking. He was also a producer of Smith's Academy Award-nominated short film First Winter.

He left the NFB in the 1990s and was briefly executive director of Film NB, the provincial filmmaking agency in New Brunswick, from March 1997 until resigning in August 1998. He then formed his own production firm, Grana Productions, for which his projects included the documentary television series Eastern Tide, and the films Geraldine's Fortune and Black Eyed Dog.

At the 9th Genie Awards in 1988, Train of Dreams was a nominee for Best Picture, and Grana was a nominee alongside Smith and Sally Bochner for Best Screenplay. At the 8th Gemini Awards in 1994, Grana, Smith and Des Walsh won the Gemini Award for Best Writing in a Dramatic Program or Miniseries for The Boys of St. Vincent.

He has also had a small number of acting roles, most notably as Alex Rossi in Walker's docufiction trilogy The Masculine Mystique, 90 Days and The Last Straw. He also appeared in The Boys of St. Vincent, in the minor role of Monsignor Forucco. He portrayed the mobster Johnny Roselli in Sugartime (1995).

== Nominations ==
He was a Genie Award nominee for Best Supporting Actor at the 7th Genie Awards in 1986 for 90 Days.
