= Maurice Podbrey =

South African actor and theatre director (born 1934)

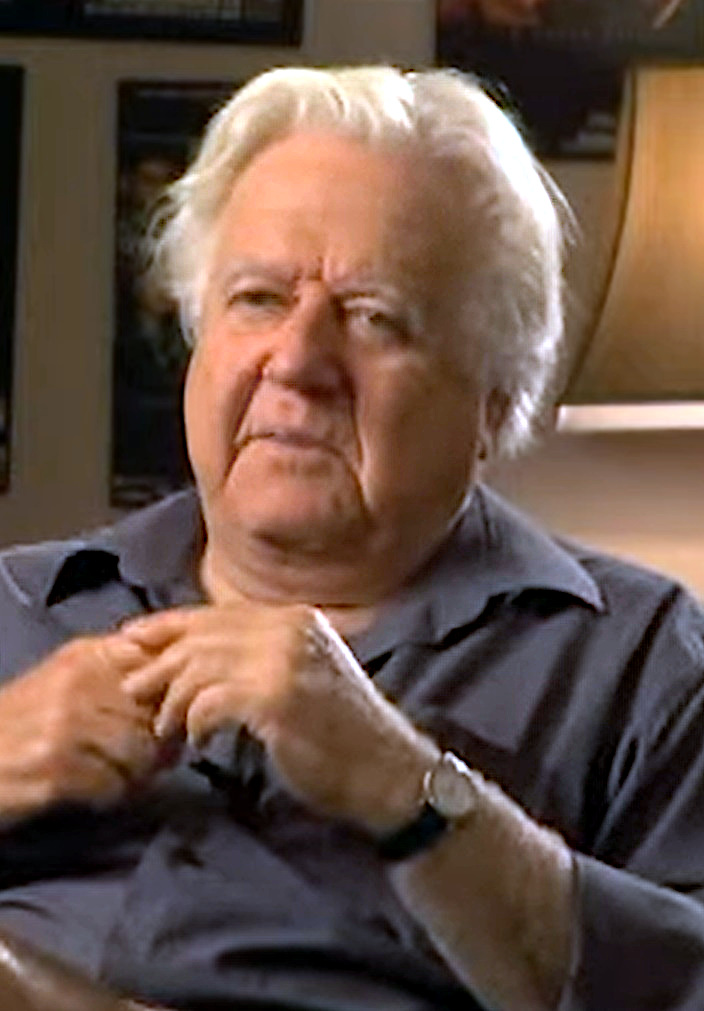
- Podbrey in 2007
- Born: April 25, 1934 (age 91); Durban, KwaZulu-Natal, South Africa
- Occupations: Theatre director, actor
- Spouse: Elsa Podbrey

Maurice Podbrey CM (born April 25, 1934) is a South African actor and theatre director. He has spent much of his career in Canada, where he co-founded and was the artistic director of the English-language Centaur Theatre in Montreal.

== Biography ==
Podbrey was born in Durban in 1934 into a Lithuanian Jewish family. His father had had Bundist sympathies and his politics influenced his children; Podbrey's sister Pauline later became a trade union organiser.

Podbrey was educated at the University of the Witwatersrand and at the College of Education; after graduating, he emigrated to England and worked as a schoolteacher. In 1959, he switched careers to work as an actor and director. He briefly served as the artistic director for the Chester Playhouse before moving again to Montreal in 1967, when he was invited to join the National Theatre School of Canada as an instructor. Seeking to remedy the lack of English-language theatre in Montreal, Podbrey and Herb Auerbach opened a theatre company in Montreal's former Montreal Stock Exchange building on François-Xavier St. in Old Montreal. Podbrey was the artistic director of the newly founded Centaur Theatre, with Auerbach acting as president and founding chairman.

Having seen and admired the work of South African playwright Athol Fugard in London, Podbrey introduced his work to the North American theatre scene by staging People Are Living There at the Centaur in 1975. Podbrey held his position as artistic director of the Centaur until his retirement in 1997, when he was succeeded by Gordon McCall. He then returned to South Africa and founded Mopo Cultural Trust, a non-profit devoted to developing South African theatre.

Podbrey was awarded membership of the Order of Canada on April 19, 1991, for his services to the performing arts in Canada.

== Film and television performances ==
Date	Title	Role	Notes
1960	Scotland Yard (BBC TV series)	Detective	Episode: "Information Received"
1964	A Christmas Night with the Stars	Vicar	Episode dated December 24, 1964
1965	Out of the Unknown	Director	Episode: "A Stranger in the Family"
1965	The Wednesday Play	Sergeant	Episode: "The Girl Who Loved Robots"
1964-66	Hugh and I		2 episodes
1964-1967	Theatre 625		2 episodes
1971	Doodle Film	Voice	Short
1974	Why Rock the Boat?	Guest Speaker	
1975	Aucassin and Nicolette	Narrator	Short
1977	Strangers at the Door		Short
1981	Happy Birthday to Me	Dr. Feinblum	
1982	Odyssey of the Pacific	Policeman	
1982-1983	The Mysterious Cities of Gold	Governor Pizarro	39 episodes
1985	One Step Away		
1986	Spearfield's Daughter	London Editor	
1987	The Last Straw	Dr. Cameron	
1991	Urban Angel	Newton Mackenzie	Episode: "Battered Lives"
1992	The Boys of St. Vincent	Archbishop	
1993	Love and Human Remains	The Theatre Director	
1994	Mrs. Parker and the Vicious Circle	Long Island Investor	
1996	Everything to Gain	The Priest	
1998	The Adventures of Sinbad	Fin	Episode: "Castle Keep"
1998	The Sleep Room	Dr. Gottlieb	
1998	Inside Out (1998 film)	Costa	

== Bibliography ==
Charlebois, Gaetan. "Maurice Podbrey." Canadian Theatre Encyclopedia. N.p., 5 July 2013. Web.

Marsh, James H. "Centaur Theatre." The Canadian Encyclopedia: Year 2000 Edition. Toronto: McClelland & Stewart, 2000. 425-26. Print.

Podbrey, Maurice, and R. Bruce. Henry. Half Man, Half Beast: Making a Life in Canadian Theatre. Montréal: Véhicule Press, 1997. Print.
