= Centaur Theatre =

Coordinates: 45.503415°N 73.556471°W

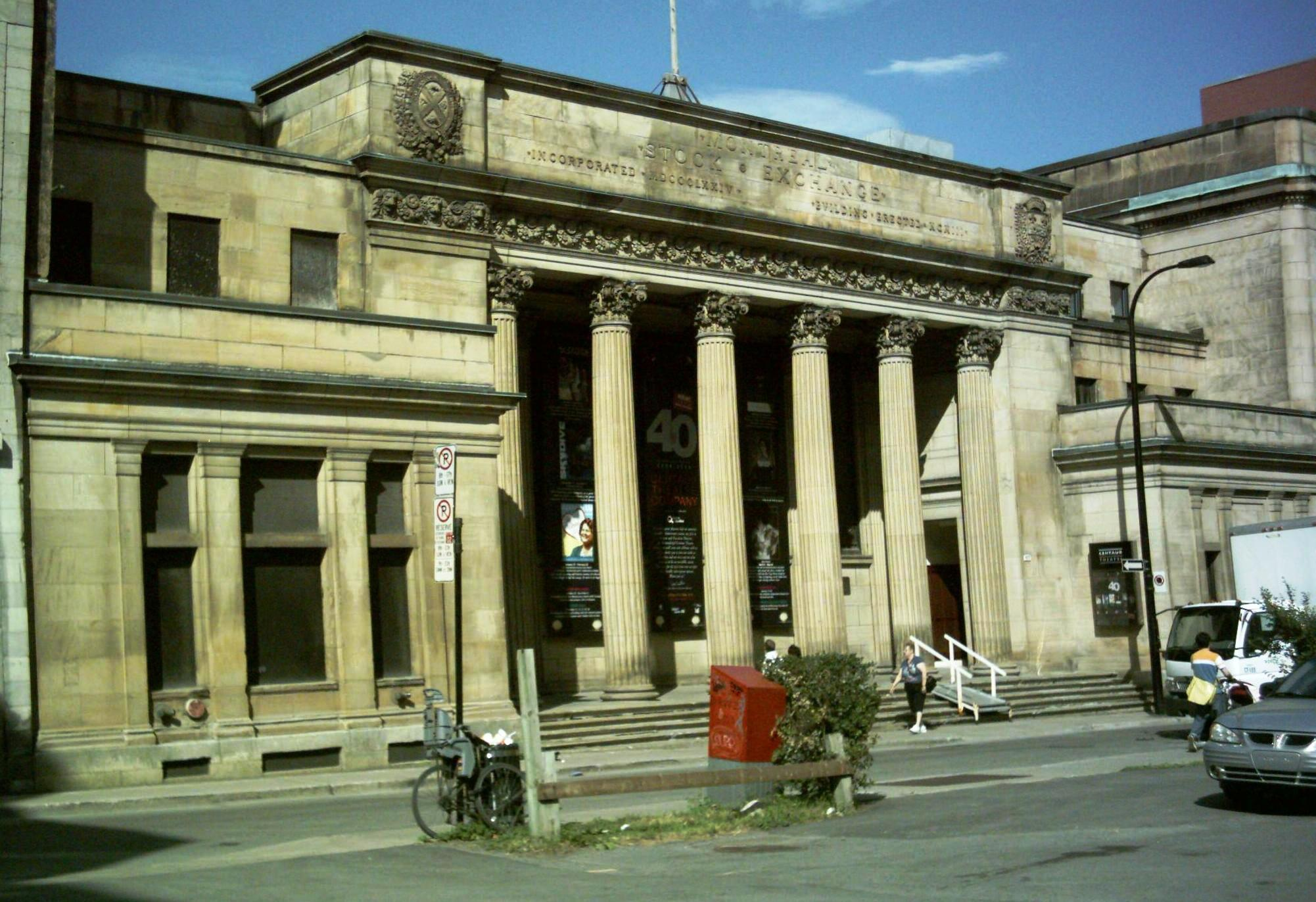
- Interactive map of Centaur Theatre
- Address: 453 St François-Xavier; Montreal, Quebec; Canada
- Designation: Local authority

Construction
- Architects: Designed by George B. Post, Construction supervised by Edward and William Maxwell

The Centaur Theatre Company is a theatre company based in Montreal, Quebec. It was co-founded in 1969 by Maurice Podbrey along with The Centaur Foundation for the Performing Arts. It currently has Eda Holmes as the artistic and executive director, and Susan Da Sie as chair of the board.

Podbrey retired from the company in 1997, and was succeeded by Gordon McCall. From 2007 to 2017 Roy Surette was the company's third artistic and executive director. In 2017 Eda Holmes was appointed the company's fourth, and first female, artistic and executive director.

The Centaur is the city's flagship English-language theatre company.

From 1969 to 1973 the company leased the partially renovated auditorium in the historic Old Stock Exchange Building. In 1974 the Centaur purchased the building and spent $1.3 million in renovations under the design of architect Victor Prus.

The building reopened in 1975 with an additional auditorium. The original black box theatre was renamed "C1", and seats approximately 220 people. The newer venue was named "C2" and is a more traditional proscenium stage, seating approximately 420.

== Old Stock Exchange Building ==
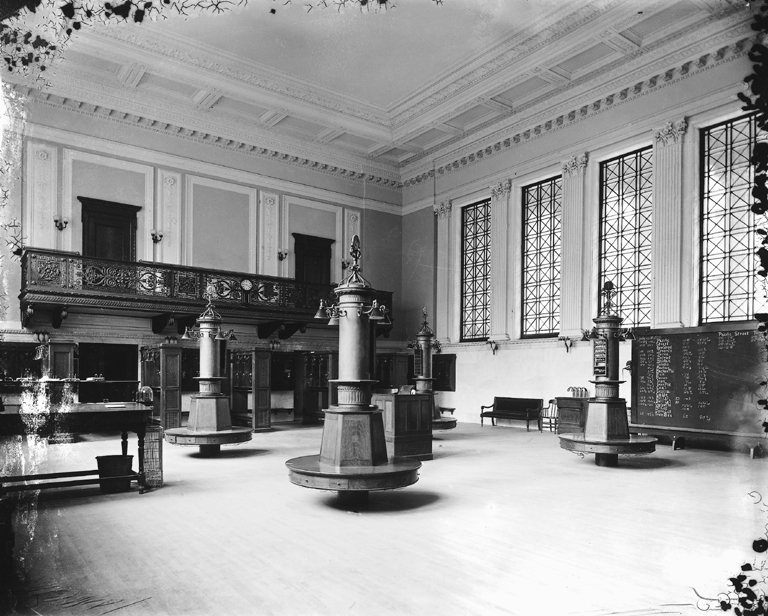
The interior of the Montreal Stock Exchange in 1903.

The Centaur Theatre is located in the Old Stock Exchange Building, formerly home to the Montreal Stock Exchange (MSE). It was built in 1903 by American architect George B. Post. The building served as the home of the MSE until 1965.
