= Greystone Theatre =

Theatre in Saskatoon, Saskatchewan, Canada

Coordinates: 52.13177°N 106.63147°W

Greystone Theatre associated with the University of Saskatchewan. The theatre was founded in 1946, by Emrys Jones, the first professor of Drama in the Commonwealth.

In 1949, an RCAF hangar was converted to the Theatre's first dedicated building.

Actors who first performed at the theatre include Frances Hyland, Kim Coates, Roy Romanow, Susan Wright and Eric Peterson.
