= The Boys of St. Vincent =

- DVD cover for German release
- Written by: Sam Grana; John N. Smith; Des Walsh
- Directed by: John N. Smith
- Starring: Henry Czerny; Sebastian Spence; David Hewlett; Timothy Webber; Brian Dooley; Lise Roy
- Music by: Neil Smolar
- Country of origin: Canada
- Original language: English

Production
- Producer: Claudio Luca
- Cinematography: Pierre Letarte
- Editor: Werner Nold
- Running time: 186 minutes (U.S.)

Original release
- Network: CBC
- Release: December 6, 1992

The Boys of St. Vincent is a 1992 Canadian television miniseries directed by John N. Smith for the National Film Board of Canada. It is a two-part docudrama inspired by real events that took place at the Mount Cashel Orphanage in St. John's, Newfoundland, one of a number of child sexual abuse scandals in the Roman Catholic Church.

The first film, The Boys of St. Vincent, covers the sexual and physical abuse of a number of orphans by Brothers headed by Brother Peter Lavin (Henry Czerny). The second film, The Boys of St. Vincent: 15 Years Later, covers the trial of the Brothers and the long-term effects of the abuse 15 years later.

The miniseries was set to premiere on Canadian television in late 1992, but due to the concurrent trials of four Ontario priests who were being tried for similar cases, a court injunction banned the broadcast in Ontario and Quebec. The ban was later overturned after appeals at federal and provincial courts and the miniseries received a nationwide broadcast in late 1993.

The Boys of St. Vincent received widespread critical acclaim and was included in lists of the Top 10 films of 1994 by Rolling Stone, Entertainment Weekly, and USA Today. It won the grand prize at the Banff Television Festival, as well as a Peabody Award and a National Board of Review award.

== Plot ==
=== Part One ===
In 1975, St. Vincent Orphanage is run by the young Brother Peter Lavin. Kevin Reevey, a 10-year-old abused child, tries to avoid Lavin's attentions by running away, but he is returned to the orphanage by police. When Lavin tries to embrace and caress him, Kevin resists and protests, "You're not my mother!" This causes Lavin to violently react to the boy, and Kevin is severely beaten with the buckle end of the brother's belt. Steven Lunny is another abused boy whose older brother Brian tries to protect him.

Finn, the orphanage's janitor, notices Kevin's injuries and worriedly sends him to a hospital. Lavin fires Finn, but Finn hires a detective to investigate the orphanage, and word starts to spread in the local community about possible abuse at St. Vincent. However, an investigation is hampered by an institutional cover-up. Because the orphanage is about to receive a grant from the government that would go towards renovations, the town's police chief wants to avoid the stain of a political scandal. The investigation is ultimately buried by the head of the justice department and church officials, and no arrests are made. Lavin and several Brothers are merely transferred.

=== Part Two ===
Fifteen years later, Lavin has left the priesthood and lives in Montreal with his wife and two sons. A cop comes to his door to arrest him on charges of sexual assault, gross indecency and misconduct, to which Lavin pleads not guilty. The St. Vincent victims, now men in their mid-20s, are called upon to give evidence in the trial. Brian has since happily married and has two children, but has not seen Steven in years; the two brothers reconcile at the trial. Kevin is haunted by his abuse and has nightmares. Steven is emotionally destroyed by the defence advocate, who reveals that he abused seven-year-old boys at the orphanage when he was sixteen. Steven then takes his own life with an overdose of drugs. His death ultimately prompts Kevin to give evidence against Lavin. Lavin remains in denial, even to his wife. His fate is left unanswered as is the question, posed by his wife at the end of the second film, as to whether he ever molested his own two young sons.

== Cast ==
- Henry Czerny as Brother Peter Lavin
- Sebastian Spence as Kevin Reevey
  - Johnny Morina as young Kevin
- Brian Dooley as Detective Noseworthy
- Philip Dinn as Mike Finn
- David Hewlett as Steven Lunny
  - Brian Dodd as young Steven
- Timothy Webber as Brian Lunny
  - Ashley Billard as young Brian
- Lise Roy as Chantal
- Mary Walsh as Lenora Pardy
- Jeremy Keefe as Mike Sproul
- Jonathan Lewis as Eddie Linane
- Michael Wade as Brother MacLaverty
- Greg Thomey as Brother Glackin
- Alain Goulem as Brother Glynn
- Aidan Devine as Brother Michael Davitt

== Production ==
The Boys of St. Vincent was a co-production between the National Film Board of Canada (NFB), the Canadian Broadcasting Corporation, and Montreal's Les Productions Télé-Action Inc.

For the orphan characters, the production sought out young boys with no prior acting experience to act alongside experienced professionals like Henry Czerny. The miniseries was shot over a period of five months, beginning in November 1991. The filmmakers did extensive preparatory work with the boys and their parents to ensure they "fully understood the grave nature of the story,” including working with experts in child sexual abuse counseling and a psychotherapist who was on set to create a safe, collaborative environment.

== Release ==
The miniseries was set to air in Canada on December 6, 1992, but the broadcast was blocked two days prior by the Ontario Court of Justice. The judge reasoned the broadcast could sway public opinion about four members of the Christian Brothers order, who at that time were being tried for actual cases of abuse in the Ontario courts, and thus impede the perpetrators' right to a fair trial. A day after the ban, the court agreed to hear arguments from lawyers for the CBC and the NFB, which resulted in the court lifting the ban and the broadcast going ahead everywhere in Canada except for Ontario and Quebec.

Though the broadcast had a limited reach, it managed to attract two million viewers. The CBC and NFB partnered with Kids Help Phone, a hotline that was available for viewers to speak to a counsellor. Set up because of the "dearth of services for adult male survivors of abuse," the hotline ended up fielding more than 300 calls. The miniseries was eventually broadcast to all of Canada in 1993, after the trials of the Christian brothers concluded.

Ivan Fecan, CBC's then vice-president of arts and entertainment, appealed to the Supreme Court in late 1992 to overturn the lower courts’ decisions completely. Two years later, the Supreme Court established a legal principle that protected free expression in a decision known as Dagenais vs. Canadian Broadcasting Corp. Daniel Henry, the CBC's senior legal counsel at the time, said the court decision "'changed the equation … in the years since, it has become established as the bedrock principle on which all publication restrictions are weighed. It's a fundamental touchstone for the importance of free expression in a democratic society.'"

=== U.S. release ===
The Boys of St. Vincent first screened in the U.S. at the 1993 Telluride Film Festival. It also garnered a theatrical run in New York City, where it received praise from Pauline Kael and Steven Spielberg.

A&E aired the two-part series on February 19 and 20, 1995. A few scenes, including one set in a shower room and others depicting verbal and physical abuse, were edited for this broadcast.

== Reception ==
On the review aggregator website Rotten Tomatoes, 100% of 6 critics' reviews are positive.

Positive reviews lauded the miniseries for its approach to a sensitive subject. David Ansen of Newsweek wrote, "An American TV movie would focus on the courtroom drama, the triumph of delayed justice. [John N.] Smith goes after deeper, harsher truths; for one boy, reliving the experience at the trial proves fatal. And we are forced to look at the monstrous Lavin in a different light. Earlier we viewed him through the children's eyes; now we have the shock of seeing him as he sees himself." Ansen added, "Czerny's portrait of this twisted, angry man is one of the most complex depictions of evil on film.”

Janet Maslin of The New York Times said, "Telling his story with a matter-of-factness that gives it the solid credibility of a documentary, Mr. Smith observes St. Vincent's daily routine and lets it imply a great deal about both the boys' and the Catholic brothers' behavior.” She also commended the performance of Czerny, saying "As played with anguished intensity by Mr. Czerny, Lavin himself feels injured in ways that a more lurid film might never understand."

The Austin Chronicle said, "The horror is filmed with admirable restraint, with director Smith opting for a less-is-more approach that only reinforces the tragedy of the events depicted. It's hardly an uplifting movie, and it ends on a distinctly sour and abrupt note, but The Boys of St. Vincent is far and away one of the best publicly funded looks at institutional child abuse ever to come out of television, Canadian or otherwise.”

Roger Ebert of the Chicago Sun-Times was less positive and wrote the film "was disappointingly superficial, offering no psychological insight or depth of characterization and simply showing us evil clergymen and victimized children as cliches in a morality play."

In 2019, a retrospective review from The Globe and Mail stated, "No drama had ever depicted the brutality of trusted authority figures in the Catholic Church (this, in the wake of 1989′s massive abuse scandal at Mount Cashel orphanage in Newfoundland) in such vivid terms, against children no less, in prime time. The film took a cinematic approach to television storytelling that predated the Netflix revolution by two decades. Twenty-three years before Hollywood’s Spotlight, it defined in dramatic fashion the deep psychological and institutional roots of abuse, and the power some have to cover up such devastating crimes.”

== Accolades ==
Year	Award	Category	Nominee	Result	Ref.
1993	Banff Television Festival	Grand Prize	The Boys of St. Vincent	Won	
1994	Boston Society of Film Critics Awards	Best Actor	Henry Czerny	Nominated	
1994	Chicago Film Critics Association Awards	Best Actor	Henry Czerny	Nominated	
1994	Gemini Awards	Best Dramatic Mini-series	Sam Grana, Claudio Luca	Won	
1994	Gemini Awards	Best Performance by an Actor in a Leading Role in a Dramatic Program or Mini-Series	Henry Czerny	Won	
1994	Gemini Awards	Best Performance by an Actress in a Supporting Role	Lise Roy	Won	
1994	Gemini Awards	Best Direction in a Dramatic Program or Mini-Series	John N. Smith	Won	
1994	Gemini Awards	Best Writing in a Dramatic Program or Mini-Series	Des Walsh, John N. Smith, Sam Grana	Won	
1994	Gemini Awards	Best Picture Editing in a Dramatic Program or Series	André Corriveau, Werner Nold	Won	
1994	Gemini Awards	Best Sound in a Dramatic Program or Series	Hans Peter Strobl, Jérôme Décarie, Antoine Morin, Marcel Pothier, Serge Beauchemin	Won	
1994	Gemini Awards	Best Performance by an Actor in a Supporting Role	Brian Dooley	Nominated	
1994	Gemini Awards	Best Costume Design	Denis Sperdouklis	Nominated	
1994	Independent Spirit Awards	Best Foreign Film	John N. Smith	Nominated	
1995	National Board of Review Awards	Best Film Made for Cable TV	The Boys of St. Vincent	Won	
1995	Peabody Awards		The Boys of St. Vincent	Won	

=== Year-end lists ===
- 2nd – Todd Anthony, Miami New Times
- 5th – Peter Travers, Rolling Stone
- 5th – Stephen Hunter, The Baltimore Sun
- Top 10 (listed alphabetically, not ranked) – Mike Clark, USA Today
- Top 10 runner-ups (not ranked) – Janet Maslin, The New York Times

== See also ==
- Roman Catholic sex abuse cases
- Dagenais v Canadian Broadcasting Corp - a case before the Supreme Court of Canada that overturned a publication ban on the broadcast of The Boys of St. Vincent
