= Gala (film) =

1982 Canadian documentary film

- Directed by: Michael McKennirey; John N. Smith
- Produced by: Michael McKennirey; John N. Smith
- Cinematography: Tony Ianzelo; Savas Kalogeras; Roger Moride
- Edited by: Michael McKennirey; John N. Smith
- Production company: National Film Board of Canada
- Release date: April 30, 1982 (NAC)
- Running time: 91 minutes
- Country: Canada
- Language: English
- Budget: $810,934

Gala is a Canadian documentary film, directed by Michael McKennirey and John N. Smith and released in 1982. A portrait of the Canadian Dance Spectacular, a 1981 show at the National Arts Centre in Ottawa, Ontario, at which eight Canadian professional dance companies all performed on stage together for the first time, the film blends both dance performance segments and backstage footage.

The participating dance companies were the National Ballet of Canada, Les Grands Ballets Canadiens, the Royal Winnipeg Ballet, le Groupe de la Place Royale, the Danny Grossman Dance Company, the Toronto Dance Theatre, the Winnipeg Contemporary Dancers, and the Anna Wyman Dance Theatre.

The event had been planned for a television broadcast on CBC Television, which was not able to proceed due to a strike by NABET, the union representing CBC production technicians; instead, the National Film Board of Canada stepped in to film it as a documentary.

The film had a budget of $810,934 (equivalent to $2,425,416 in 2025).

The film premiered on April 30, 1982, at the NAC. It subsequently received a CBC Television broadcast in September.

The film received a Genie Award nomination for Best Feature Length Documentary at the 4th Genie Awards in 1983.

== Works cited ==
- Evans, Gary (1991). In the National Interest: A Chronicle of the National Film Board of Canada from 1949 to 1989. University of Toronto Press. ISBN 0802027849.
