= Geraldine's Fortune =

- Directed by: John N. Smith
- Screenplay by: Tim Burns
- Based on: Les Belles-sœurs by Michel Tremblay
- Produced by: Greg Dummett; Sam Grana
- Starring: Jane Curtin; Mary Walsh; Matt Frewer; Sheila McCarthy
- Cinematography: Pierre Letarte
- Edited by: Gaétan Huot
- Music by: Jeff Fisher
- Release date: 3 October 2004 (Calgary Film Festival)
- Country: Canada
- Language: English

Geraldine's Fortune is a 2004 Canadian comedy-drama film. It was directed by John N. Smith, written by Tim Burns and based on the play Les Belles-sœurs by Michel Tremblay.

== Plot ==
Geraldine Liddle (Curtin) is a small town woman from New Brunswick who gains local fame as she is about to appear on a game show called Bring Home the Bacon (a show with a pig theme similar to Who Wants to Be a Millionaire?) with a top prize of $2 million dollars. As friends and family gather to watch Geraldine on television, family secrets come to surface and a physical fight occurs, bringing all the family and friends outdoors. As the fight is happening, Geraldine calls them for help with a question during the game show. After the question is asked, the scene turns back to the home where the fight is happening outdoors and where only Geraldine's elderly mother, who has less than her full faculties, is left alone, inside near the phone. The telephone rings and rings and rings, until finally she answers. Geraldine, realizing the senility of the woman, doesn't know whether to trust her answer. Geraldine and her husband return to announce whether she answered the question correctly or not, only to discover long buried family truths have come to light.

== Cast ==
- Jane Curtin ... as Geraldine Liddle
- Mary Walsh ... as Rose Owens
- Sheila McCarthy ... as Tina
- Matt Frewer ... as Cameron Geary
- Peter MacNeill ... as Henry Liddle
- Monique Mercure ... as Olive Larose
- Marina Orsini ... as Cilla
- Pascale Montpetit ... as Diede Murphy
- Patrick McKenna ... as Louie Owen
- Jennifer Morehouse ... as Greta Jones
- Nicole Maillet ... as Linda Liddle
- Tori Mitchell ... as Luara Larose
- Dylan Smith ... as Josh Fisher
