= Dylan Smith (actor) =

Canadian actor (born 1975)

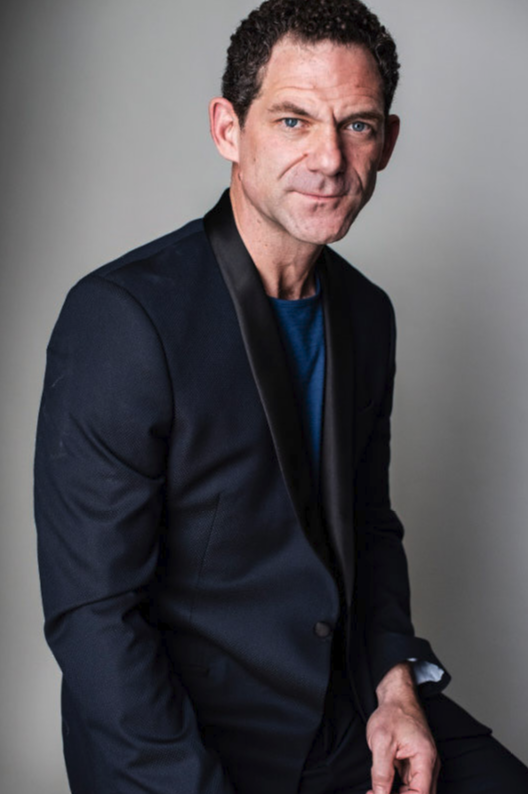
- Born: Dylan Scott Smith; April 11, 1975 (age 51); Montreal, Quebec, Canada
- Occupation: Actor
- Years active: 1995–present

Dylan Scott Smith is a Canadian actor. He is known for his portrayal of the characters Sepp on TNT's I Am the Night, Jasper in Maze Runner: The Death Cure, Daniel in Lemonade, and Largo Brandyfoot in The Lord of the Rings: The Rings of Power.

== Early life and education ==
Dylan Scott Smith was born in Montreal, the son of Academy Award-nominated film director John N. Smith, and documentarian, Academy Award winner, and member of the Royal Canadian Academy of Arts, Cynthia Scott.

He grew up playing ice hockey, getting a sports scholarship for college, but after an injury that made him change his career, he studied theatre at the University of Toronto. There, he joined the Soulpepper Theatre Company.

== Career ==
Smith continued to study acting at Webber Douglas in London, England, where he took leading roles in TV shows like the British classic EastEnders, and in films such as Murder On The Orient Express.

Smith was cast in Private Lives on Broadway. There he met his wife, British theatre director Anna Ledwich.

In his early work, Smith portrayed secondary characters in films like 300 (2006), Immortals (2011), and Total Recall (2012).

In 2016, Smith played the role of Lakan in Hulu film Dawn, and Tristam Blanchard in the BBC TV series Ripper Street.

In 2017, he portrayed the pilot in the film The Mummy, and Jenkins in the TV series Into the Badlands.

In 2018, his main roles were Jasper in Maze Runner: The Death Cure, and Daniel in Lemonade, a drama from Cristian Mungiu.

In 2019, Smith played the character of Sepp on TNT's I Am the Night.

In 2022, Smith played the Harfoot Largo Brandyfoot in the Prime Video series The Lord of the Rings: The Rings of Power.

== Filmography ==
=== Film ===
Year	Title	Role	Notes
2002	Al's Lads	Saul	
2004	Geraldine's Fortune	Josh Fisher	
2006	300	Sentry	
2008	Kit Kittredge: An American Girl	Frederich	
2009	Love and Savagery	Sean Collins	
2010	Hangnail	Kenny	Short
2011	High Chicago	Tiny	
2011	Immortals	Stephanos	
2012	Eddie	Eddie	
2012	Total Recall	Hammond	
2015	Forsaken	Little Ned	
2015	Twine	Esus	Short
2016	October 9th	Fathers Adoptive Family	Short
2016	Spectral	Talbot	
2017	The Mummy	Pilot	
2017	Jonah	Fergus	Short
2018	Maze Runner: The Death Cure	Jasper	
2018	Lemonade	Daniel	
2019	First Cow	Trapper Jack	
2020	The Forgotten Battle	Black Watch Lt. Colonel Stewart	
2021	SAS: Red Notice	Alex	

=== Television ===
Year	Title	Role	Notes
1995	Sugartime	Prison Guard	TV Movie
2001	Murder on the Orient Express	Tony Foscarelli	TV Movie
2001	EastEnders	Ricardo	2 episodes
2008	The Englishman's Boy	Ed Grace	2 episodes
2009	Cold Blood	Const. Chris Brown	1 episode
2010	Murdoch Mysteries	Quentin Quinn	1 episode
2012	Alphas	Ted Asher	1 episode
2013	Republic of Doyle	Dante Peterson	1 episode
2016	Ripper Street	Tristam Blanchard	1 episode
2016	Dawn	Lakan	TV Movie
2017	Into the Badlands	Jenkins	5 episodes
2019	I Am the Night	Sepp	6 episodes
2019	MotherFatherSon	Mr. Roberts	1 episode
2019	Treadstone	Lowell	2 episodes
2022	The Lord of the Rings: The Rings of Power	Largo Brandyfoot	6 episodes
2024	Showtrial	Dr Towler	1 episode
