= Lemonade (2018 film) =

2018 film

- Film poster
- Directed by: Ioana Uricaru
- Written by: Ioana Uricaru
- Starring: Malina Manovici
- Release dates: 19 February 2018 (Berlin); 26 October 2018 (Romania)
- Running time: 88 minutes
- Country: Romania
- Language: English

Lemonade (Romanian: Luna de miere) is a 2018 Romanian drama film directed by Ioana Uricaru. It was screened in the Panorama section at the 68th Berlin International Film Festival. The Romanian-Canadian co-production, set in Upstate New York, was shot in Montreal.

== Cast ==
- Mălina Manovici as Mara
- Dylan Smith as Daniel
- Steve Bacic as Moji
- Milan Hurduc as Dragos
- Ruxandra Maniu as Aniko
