= Stefan Wodoslawsky =

Canadian film producer and actor (born 1952)

Stefan Wodoslawsky (born 1951) is a Canadian film producer and actor. Associated in his early career with the National Film Board of Canada, he is most noted as coproducer with Roman Kroitor of the 1979 film Bravery in the Field. The film was a nominee for Best Live Action Short Film at the 52nd Academy Awards and won the Best TV Drama Under 30 Minutes at the 1st Genie Awards.

== Biography ==
Wodoslawsky was born in Sydney, Nova Scotia. In the 1980s, he also had a number of acting roles, beginning with Giles Walker's mockumentary trilogy The Masculine Mystique, 90 Days and The Last Straw. He also starred in the 1988 drama film Something About Love, on which he was also a coproducer and cowriter. In the same era, he was codirector with Tony Ianzelo of Give Me Your Answer True, a documentary film profiling actor Donald Sutherland.

After leaving the National Film Board he joined the commercial production firm Allegro Films, working primarily on dramatic thriller and television films.
