= Bravery in the Field =

- Directed by: Giles Walker
- Written by: Giles Walker; Alexander Bremner; Ian MacNeill; John Kent Harrison
- Produced by: Roman Kroitor; Stefan Wodoslawsky
- Starring: Les Rubie; Matt Craven
- Cinematography: Savas Kalogeras
- Edited by: Les Halman; Susan Shanks
- Music by: Ben Low
- Production company: National Film Board of Canada
- Release date: 1979
- Running time: 29 minutes
- Country: Canada
- Language: English
- Budget: $252,527

Bravery in the Field is a 1979 Canadian short drama film, produced by the National Film Board of Canada and directed by Giles Walker.

The film stars Les Rubie as Tommy, an aging World War II veteran, and Matt Craven as Lennie, a young street thug, who end up having a profound impact on each other's lives after Lennie's attempt to rob Tommy ends up with both of them in hospital recovering from their injuries.

== Production ==
The film had a budget of $252,527 (equivalent to $1,036,623 in 2025).

== Reception ==
Clifford Chadderton criticized the film in an open letter on 8 May 1980, due to the hero being an alcoholic.

== Awards ==
The film was an Academy Award nominee for Best Live Action Short Film at the 52nd Academy Awards, and won the Genie Award for Best TV Drama Under 30 Minutes at the 1st Genie Awards. Savas Kalogeras won the Genie for Cinematography in a Dramatic Film (Non-Feature).

== Works cited ==
- Evans, Gary (1991). In the National Interest: A Chronicle of the National Film Board of Canada from 1949 to 1989. University of Toronto Press. ISBN 0802027849.
