= First Winter =

- Directed by: John N. Smith
- Written by: Gloria Demers; Cynthia Scott
- Produced by: John N. Smith; Sam Grana
- Starring: Kathleen McAuliffe; Sharon O'Neill; Eric Patrick Godfrey; Kevin Kennedy
- Cinematography: David De Volpi
- Edited by: Richard Todd
- Music by: Tadhg De Brun
- Production company: National Film Board of Canada
- Release date: 1981
- Running time: 26 minutes
- Country: Canada
- Language: English

First Winter is a 1981 Canadian short film, produced by the National Film Board of Canada and directed by John N. Smith. It is about an Irish immigrant family's first winter in Canada in 1830, centring on the hardships experienced by the mother (Kathleen McAuliffe) and children (Sharon O'Neill and Eric Patrick Godfrey) while the father (Kevin Kennedy) is away working at a logging camp.

The film was shot in 1980, in and around Algonquin Park. Smith went directly to Ireland to cast the roles of the children, as he needed to find kids who were able to speak Irish Gaelic.

The film was nominated for an Academy Award for Best Live Action Short Film at the 54th Academy Awards in 1982.
