= Blind Terror =

2001 television film directed by Giles Walker

- DVD cover
- Directed by: Giles Walker
- Written by: Douglas Soesbe
- Produced by: Elisabeth-Ann Gimber; Geoffrey Patenaude
- Starring: Nastassja Kinski; Gordon Pinsent
- Cinematography: Georges Archambault
- Edited by: Isabelle Levesque
- Music by: Marty Simon
- Production company: Hearst Entertainment Productions
- Distributed by: Boulevard Entertainment
- Release date: April 23, 2001 (United States)
- Country: Canada
- Language: English

Blind Terror is a 2001 thriller film directed by Giles Walker and starring Nastassja Kinski, Stewart Bick and Gordon Pinsent. It was written by Douglas Soesbe.

== Premise ==
Kinski plays a wealthy, talented young widow who remarries in haste. Suddenly her world is shattered by a series of threatening calls from her new husband's ex-wife. When efforts to stop the woman's assault of terror fails, Kinski is forced to act on her own, uncovering a secret.

== Cast ==
- Nastassja Kinski as Susan
- Stewart Bick as Kevin Markson
- Maxim Roy as Justine
- Jack Langedijk as Det. John Kramer
- Victoria Snow as Peggy
- Gordon Pinsent as Martin Howell
- Frank Schorpion as Alan
- Edward Yankie as Jack
- Noel Burton as Client
- Paulina B. Abarca as Mary Jenkins (as Paulina Abarca)
- Gary Plaxton as Dr. Schilner
- Kathleen Fee as Records Clerk
- Andrew Jason Wade as Parking Attendant
- Charles S. Doucet as Cemetery Maintenance (as Charles Doucet)
- Russell Yuen as Security Guard
