= The Last Straw (1987 film) =

1987 film by Giles Walker

- Directed by: Giles Walker
- Screenplay by: Giles Walker; David Wilson
- Produced by: Giles Walker; David Wilson
- Starring: Sam Grana; Beverley Murray; Stefan Wodoslawsky; Christine Pak; Fernanda Tavares; Wally Martin; Patricia Phillips; Maurice Podbrey; Barry Sullivan
- Cinematography: Andrew Kitzanuk
- Edited by: David Wilson
- Music by: Robert Lauzon; Fernand Martel
- Production company: National Film Board of Canada
- Release date: 1987
- Running time: 98 minutes
- Country: Canada
- Language: English

The Last Straw is a Canadian comedy film, released in 1987. Directed by Giles Walker and written by Walker and David Wilson, the film is a sequel to the films The Masculine Mystique and 90 Days.

In The Last Straw, Alex (Sam Grana) and Laura (Fernanda Tavares) are now running the sperm donation business proposed in 90 Days, while Blue (Stefan Wodoslawsky) and Hyang-Sook (Christine Pak) are ready to start a family but have discovered that Blue is infertile. Alex becomes embroiled in international espionage when foreign countries are willing to pay millions of dollars or even to commit kidnapping because his sperm is so highly prized, while Blue's infertility places a strain on his relationship with Hyang-Sook.

The film was originally announced in 1986 as being slated to premiere at the Cannes Film Festival in 1987, although it did not do so and instead premiered at the 1987 Festival of Festivals. A short preview teaser was however screened at the Berlin International Film Festival.

== Critical reception ==
The film was less well received by critics than 90 Days. Ron Base of the Toronto Star wrote that the film "lacks any of the humor or insight into life and love in the urban '80s possessed by its predecessor", while The Globe and Mail wrote that while the film "strives vigorously to be demented, farcical and surreal in the Monty Python mode", it succeeded only in being farcical, and that the film's climax "chops an already ragged premise into a celluloid shower".
