= 1985 in Canadian television =

This is a list of Canadian television related events from 1985.

== Events ==
Date	Event
March 5	6th Genie Awards.
March 5	The final episode of the children's series The Friendly Giant airs on CBC Television. The show broadcast for more than 26 years and over 3000 episodes.
October 21	Children's animated television series The Raccoons airs on CBC Television.
November 4	Juno Awards of 1985.
December 5	The first Anne of Green Gables movie airs on CBC Television. The movie draws big ratings.

=== Debuts ===
Show	Station	Premiere Date
Venture	CBC Television	January 7
Fred Penner's Place	CBC Television	January 7
Midday	CBC Television	January 7
Check it Out!	CTV	January 7
Night Heat	CTV	January 31
Strangers and Brothers	Masterpiece Theatre	May 1
Thomas the Tank Engine & Friends	Knowledge Network	September 13
The Raccoons	CBC Television	October 21

=== Ending this year ===
Show	Station	Cancelled
Reach for the Top	CBC Television	March 7
The Friendly Giant	CBC Television	March 7
The Mad Dash	CTV	March 7
Snow Job	CTV	March 7
The Littlest Hobo	CTV	March 7
Bizarre	CTV	September 10
Circus	CTV	Unknown
Smith & Smith	CHCH	Unknown

== Television shows ==
=== 1950s ===
- Country Canada (1954–2007)
- Hockey Night in Canada (1952–present)
- The National (1954–present)
- Front Page Challenge (1957–1995)
- Wayne and Shuster Show (1958–1989)

=== 1960s ===
- CTV National News (1961–present)
- Land and Sea (1964–present)
- Man Alive (1967–2000)
- Mr. Dressup (1967–1996)
- The Nature of Things (1960–present, scientific documentary series)
- Question Period (1967–present, news program)
- The Tommy Hunter Show (1965–1992)
- W-FIVE (1966–present, newsmagazine program)

=== 1970s ===
- The Beachcombers (1972–1990)
- Canada AM (1972–present, news program)
- City Lights (1973–1989)
- Definition (1974–1989)
- the fifth estate (1975–present, newsmagazine program)
- Live It Up! (1978–1990)
- Marketplace (1972–present, newsmagazine program)
- Polka Dot Door (1971-1993)
- You Can't Do That on Television (1979–1990)
- 100 Huntley Street (1977–present, religious program)

=== 1980s ===
- Bumper Stumpers (1987–1990)
- Danger Bay (1984–1990)
- The Edison Twins (1982–1986)
- Fraggle Rock (1983–1987)
- Guess What (1983–1987)
- Hangin' In (1981–1987)
- The Journal (1982–1992)
- Lorne Greene's New Wilderness (1982–1987)
- Seeing Things (1981–1987)
- Switchback (1981–1990)
- Today's Special (1982–1987)
- Thrill of a Lifetime (1981–1987)
- Video Hits (1984–1993)

== TV movies ==
- The Boy Next Door
- Charlie Grant's War
- The Execution of Raymond Graham
- The Exile
- The Front Line
- Oakmount High
- Tools of the Devil
- Tramp at the Door
- Where the Heart Is

== Births ==
Date	Name	Notability
February 11	Harris Allan	Actor

== See also ==
- 1985 in Canada
- List of Canadian films of 1985
