= François Dauteuil =

Canadian film and television director

François Dauteuil (French pronunciation: [fʁɑ̃swa dotœj]), born in 1957, is a former Canadian filmmaker and television director. He began his career in the television series La Course autour du monde and later gained wider recognition through his short and medium-length drama movies, which earned him a Best Director Award and Best Soundtrack Award at the Yorkton Film Festival.

== Early life and education ==
François Dauteuil was born in Montreal, Quebec, in 1957, as the first child of French-speaking parents. His father was a psychologist. Dauteuil first studied business administration at the Université de Montréal, then art cinema at Concordia University.

== Career and filmography ==
In 1981, Dauteuil was selected to represent Canada in the 1981-1982 edition of La Course autour du monde (The Race around the World), a television series broadcast in France, Canada, Belgium, Luxembourg and Switzerland. In 1982, he was filming a group of strikers demonstrating in Lisbon when he was injured by a police charge. Prior to this incident, Dauteuil had remained among the top favourites for the first twelve weeks of the series.

In 1985, Summer Rain (Pluie d'été), a short drama written and directed by Dauteuil, was featured at the Rendez-vous du cinéma québécois festival. The film was awarded the Best Director Award at the Yorkton Film Festival, and was a Genie Award nominee for Best Live Action Short Drama at the 7th Genie Awards in 1986.

The same year, Dauteuil directed Ils mèneront le monde, a television series that presented the young generation's views on issues related to the environment, war, work, crime, education and men-women relations.

In 1990, Oui Allô! Estelle?, a medium-length written and directed by Dauteuil, was broadcast by Radio-Canada. The movie won the Best Drama Over 30 Minutes and the Best Sound Awards at the Yorkton Film Festival.
