= I'll Never Get to Heaven =

1993 Canadian television film

- Written by: Kathleen M. Turner
- Directed by: Stefan Scaini
- Starring: Amy Stewart; Wendy Crewson; Victor Garber
- Music by: Eric Robertson
- Country of origin: Canada
- Original language: English

Production
- Producer: Flora Macdonald
- Cinematography: Nikos Evdemon
- Editors: John Frizzell; Joann McIntyre; Ron Wisman
- Running time: 92 minutes
- Production company: Canadian Broadcasting Corporation

Original release
- Network: CBC Television
- Release: January 31, 1993

I'll Never Get to Heaven is a Canadian comedy-drama television film, directed by Stefan Scaini and released in 1993.

Set in Toronto in the 1960s, the film stars Amy Stewart as Margaret, a 13-year-old girl whose life changes radically when her father abandons the family. She and her mother Cassie (Wendy Crewson) move back in with Margaret's grandparents John (Sean McCann) and Trea (Patricia Gage), where Cassie begins a new romance with widowed photographer Eric (Victor Garber), while Margaret befriends Betty (Aidan Pendleton), a girl whose rebellious attitude toward the nuns at their Catholic school challenges Margaret's adherence to the strict religious values she was raised with.

The cast also includes Susan Wright as Betty's eccentric aunt and caretaker Dora, as well as Samantha Follows, Marc Marut, Dylan Neal, Illya Woloshyn and Sheila Heti in supporting roles.

The film drew on aspects of the real-life childhood of screenwriter Kathleen M. Turner, but she stressed that it was not meant to be understood as autobiographical.

It aired on January 31, 1993, on CBC Television.

== Awards ==
Award	Date of ceremony	Category	Recipient(s)	Result	Ref(s)
Gemini Awards	March 6, 1994	Best TV Movie	Flora Macdonald	Nominated	
Gemini Awards	March 6, 1994	Best Performance by an Actress in a Leading Role in a Dramatic Program or Mini-Series	Wendy Crewson	Nominated	
Gemini Awards	March 6, 1994	Best Supporting Actress in a Drama Program or Series	Susan Wright	Nominated	
Gemini Awards	March 6, 1994	Best Writing in a Dramatic Mini-Series	Kathleen M. Turner	Nominated	
Gemini Awards	March 6, 1994	Best Production Design or Art Direction	Perri Gorrara, Ane Christensen	Won	
Gemini Awards	March 6, 1994	Best Costume Design	Frances Dafoe	Nominated	
