= Summer Rain (1985 film) =

1985 Canadian short film

- French: Pluie d'été
- Directed by: François Dauteuil
- Written by: François Dauteuil
- Produced by: Louis-Georges Tétreault
- Starring: Paul Hébert; Linda Sorgini; Geneviève Rioux; Martin Faucher
- Cinematography: Louis De Ernsted
- Edited by: François Dupuis
- Production company: Les Productions SDA
- Distributed by: Société Radio-Canada
- Release date: February 1985 (RVCQ)
- Running time: 28 minutes
- Country: Canada
- Language: French

Summer Rain (French: Pluie d'été) is a Canadian short film, directed by François Dauteuil and released in 1985. The film stars Paul Hébert as a farmer whose scarecrow transforms into a beautiful young woman (Geneviève Rioux) on a warm summer night.

The film's cast also includes Linda Sorgini and Martin Faucher.

The film premiered at the 1985 Rendez-vous du cinéma québécois.

The film was awarded the Best Director Award at the 1985 Yorkton Film Festival, and was a Genie Award nominee for Best Live Action Short Drama at the 7th Genie Awards in 1986.
