= The Last Polka =

- Genre: Comedy; Music; Mockumentary
- Written by: John Candy; Eugene Levy
- Directed by: John Blanchard
- Starring: John Candy; Eugene Levy; Rick Moranis
- Music by: Russ Little
- Country of origin: Canada
- Original language: English

Production
- Executive producers: John Candy; Eugene Levy
- Producer: James Paul Rock
- Production locations: Kitchener, Ontario; Waterloo, Ontario; Toronto
- Cinematography: Martin Corley; John Crampton; Richard G. Mason
- Editor: Bill Goddard
- Running time: 54 mins

Original release
- Network: HBO
- Release: March 14, 1985

The Last Polka is a 1985 comedy television film. It was written by and starred John Candy and Eugene Levy, and directed by John Blanchard.

The Last Polka follows the life, careers, and final concert of Yosh (Candy) and Stan (Levy) Shmenge, two brothers from the fictional country of Leutonia who become the biggest polka duo the world has ever seen, presented as a mixture of live concert performances and filmed scenes.

Many fellow SCTV performers including Rick Moranis, Catherine O'Hara, and Robin Duke appear in the film.

Dave Thomas narrates.

The live concert in the film is a loose parody of The Band's concert movie The Last Waltz. Special guests and longtime Shmenge collaborators include The Lemon Twins (Duke, O'Hara and her real life sister Mary Margaret O'Hara) doing a medley of their "hits" and also Linsk Minyk (Moranis) performing a medley of road songs that culminates in a version of the Doors' "Touch Me".

One scene has The Shmenges performing in an outdoor stadium Michael Jackson salute concert, complete with glitter outfits, sequin glove, and a polka version of "Beat It".

The Shmenges were originally created as characters for the television series Second City TV and were also known on SCTV as The Happy Wanderers.

The Last Polka was produced for and first broadcast on the HBO cable network.

Both John Candy and Eugene Levy were nominated in 1985 for a Cable Ace Award in the Best Performance in a Comedy Special category.
