= Mortimer Griffin and Shalinsky =

- Directed by: Mort Ransen
- Written by: Mort Ransen and Mordecai Richler
- Release date: 1985
- Running time: 24 minutes
- Country: Canada
- Language: English

Mortimer Griffin and Shalinsky is a 1985 National Film Board of Canada short film written by Academy Award-winning screenwriter Mordecai Richler and directed by Mort Ransen. It is about an eccentric Jewish intellectual who accuses his teacher of hiding his Jewish identity. The film is based on Richler's 1978 short story, "Mortimer Griffin, Shalinsky and How they Settled the Jewish Question".

== Summary ==
Shalinsky, a Jewish university student, is convinced that his non-Jewish professor Mortimer Griffin is guilty of changing his name, suspecting the instructor of hiding his Jewish identity.

After listening attentively to Griffin's analysis of Kafka’s The Metamorphosis, all the other students file out of the classroom, but Shalinsky lingers to compliment his teacher. After offering words of praise, between puffs of his cigarette, he asks pointedly, "Why did you change your name? You’re a Jew."

Of course, Griffin is not Jewish and he tells Shalinsky this fact. Griffin is amused at first and tells his Jewish friends about the incident. However, Shalinsky persists, and simply won't accept that Griffin is not Jewish. Eventually, Griffin gets more and more irritated by Shalinsky's refusal to accept the truth. Finally, irritation gives way to anger and Griffin blurts out comments that sound anti-Semitic. Griffin has a nervous breakdown.

In the satirical aftermath, we learn that Griffin has converted to Judaism and become religious.

== Reception ==
The film was screened at the Toronto Jewish Film Festival, and won the Red Ribbon for Literary Adaptations at the 1986 American Film and Video Festival.
