= Linda Sorgini =

Canadian actress (born 1955)

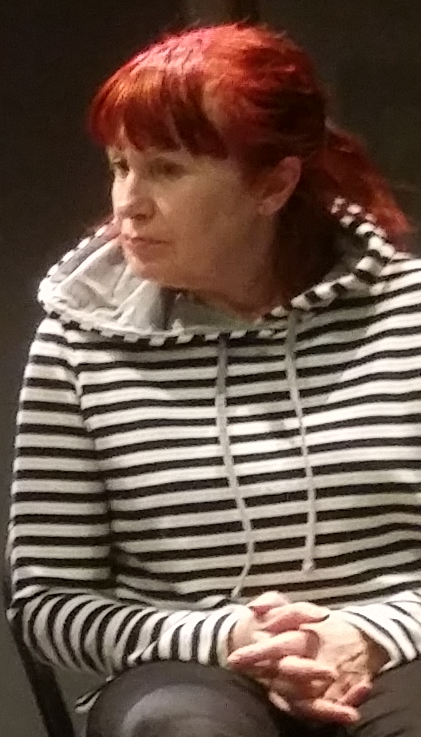
- Born: 1955; Sudbury, Ontario, Canada
- Occupation: Actress
- Years active: 1980s–present

Linda Sorgini (born 1955) is a Canadian actress who works primarily in Quebec. She is most noted for her performance in the 1983 film The Tin Flute (Bonheur d'occasion), for which she was a Genie Award nominee for Best Supporting Actress at the 5th Genie Awards in 1984.

A native of Sudbury, Ontario, she studied theatre at the University of Ottawa and the National Theatre School of Canada.

Her other performances have included the films Summer Rain (Pluie d'été), Brother André (Le Frère André), Cruising Bar, Ding et Dong, The Ideal Man (L'Homme idéal), Streetheart (Le cœur au poing) and Without Her (Sans elle), the television series Watatatow, L'Auberge du chien noir, Plan B and Au secours de Béatrice, and roles on stage.
