= 7th Genie Awards =

1986 Canadian film awards

- Date: March 20, 1986
- Site: Metro Toronto Convention Centre
- Hosted by: Leslie Nielsen and Catherine Mary Stewart

Highlights
- Best Picture: My American Cousin
- Most awards: My American Cousin (6)
- Most nominations: Joshua Then and Now (12)

Television coverage
- Network: CBC Television

The 7th Genie Awards were held on March 20, 1986, at the Metro Toronto Convention Centre to honour achievements in Canadian film in 1985. The ceremony was co-hosted by actors Leslie Nielsen and Catherine Mary Stewart.

After years of excluding foreign members of Canadian film productions from eligibility, everyone could now compete equally. For the first time in the Genies' history, all of the top contenders were well-known films. Voters chose from a strong slate of contenders, although Phillip Borsos not receiving a nomination in the directing category for One Magic Christmas was analyzed as a snub. Jay Scott of The Globe and Mail also initially labelled the lack of a Best Documentary nomination for Donald Brittain's Canada's Sweetheart: The Saga of Hal C. Banks as a snub; however, as it had been distributed primarily as a television broadcast rather than in theatres, it was instead treated as a television film and received numerous nominations at the Academy's 1st Gemini Awards later the same year.

The academy presented two Special Achievement awards, the first to IMAX president and co-founder Graeme Ferguson. The second was to Judith Crawley and Radford 'Budge' Crawley in recognition of 40 years of contributions to the Canadian film industry. They couple began their career making training films for the National Film Board of Canada; by the 1950s, Crawley Films was the largest independent production company in Canada. Their 1975 film The Man Who Skied Down Everest was the first Canadian feature-length documentary to win an Oscar.

== Winners and nominees ==
Motion Picture	Direction
My American Cousin — Peter O'Brian; 90 Days — David Wilson and Giles Walker; The Alley Cat (Le Matou) — Justine Héroux; Joshua Then and Now — Robert Lantos and Stephen J. Roth; One Magic Christmas — Peter O'Brian	Sandy Wilson, My American Cousin; Jean Beaudin, The Alley Cat (Le Matou); Claude Jutra, The Dame in Colour (La dame en couleurs); Ted Kotcheff, Joshua Then and Now; Giles Walker, 90 Days
Actor in a leading role	Actress in a leading role
John Wildman, My American Cousin; Serge Dupire, The Alley Cat (Le Matou); Ed McNamara, Bayo; Alan Scarfe, Overnight; R.H. Thomson, Samuel Lount	Margaret Langrick, My American Cousin; Charlotte Laurier, The Dame in Colour (La dame en couleurs); Christine Pak, 90 Days; Monique Spaziani, The Alley Cat (Le Matou); Mary Steenburgen, One Magic Christmas
Actor in a supporting role	Actress in a supporting role
Alan Arkin, Joshua Then and Now; Richard Donat, My American Cousin; Duncan Fraser, Overnight; Sam Grana, 90 Days; Sean Sullivan, The Boy in Blue	Linda Sorenson, Joshua Then and Now; Lally Cadeau, Separate Vacations; Barbara Gordon, Overnight; Fernanda Tavares, 90 Days
Feature Length Documentary	Best Short Documentary
Final Offer — Robert Collison and Sturla Gunnarsson; Artie Shaw: Time Is All You've Got — Brigitte Berman; The Choice of a People (Le Choix d'un peuple) — Bernard Lalonde; Tears Are Not Enough — John Zaritsky; Waterwalker — Bill Mason	No More Hiroshima — Martin Duckworth; Neon, an Electric Memoir — Rudy Buttignol; Skyward — Roman Kroitor
Best Live Action Short Drama	Best Animated Short
The Edit — Paul Caulfield; Summer Rain (Pluie d’été) — Louis-Georges Tétreault; Working Title — Fred Jones and Ken Scott	The Big Snit, Richard Condie and Michael Scott; Paradise (Paradis), Ishu Patel; Sylvia, Yves Leduc
Art Direction/Production Design	Cinematography
Anne Pritchard, Joshua Then and Now; William Beeton, The Boy in Blue; Bill Brodie, One Magic Christmas; Phil Schmidt, My American Cousin; François Séguin, Night Magic	François Protat, Joshua Then and Now; Marc Champion, Samuel Lount; Frank Tidy, One Magic Christmas
Costume Design	Editing
Louise Jobin, Joshua Then and Now; Sheila Bingham and Phillip Clarkson, My American Cousin; Olga Dimitrov, One Magic Christmas; Olga Dimitrov, Samuel Lount	Haida Paul, My American Cousin; Richard Martin, Samuel Lount; Sally Paterson, Overnight; David Wilson, 90 Days; Ron Wisman, Joshua Then and Now
Overall Sound	Sound Editing
David Appleby, Joe Grimaldi, Bruce Nyznik, Bruce Carwardine, Glen Gauthier and Don White, One Magic Christmas; Don Cohen, Austin Grimaldi, Dino Pigat, and Joe Grimaldi, Joshua Then and Now; Garrell Clark and Paul A. Sharpe, My American Cousin	Robin Leigh, Richard Cadger, Glen Gauthier, Michael O'Farrell, Alan Geldart, Alison Clark and Peter Thilaye, One Magic Christmas; Jacqueline Cristianini, Alison Clark, Tony Currie and Gordon Thompson, My American Cousin; Adrian Croll, Jean-Pierre Joutel, and Richard Besse, The Dame in Colour (La dame en couleurs); Robin Leigh, David Evans, Fred Brennan, Richard Cadger, Penny Hozy, and Wayne Griffin, Joshua Then and Now; Michael O'Farrell, Samuel Lount; Serge Viau and Paul Dion, The Alley Cat (Le Matou); Don White, David Appleby, and Dan Latour, The Boy in Blue
Achievement in Music: Original Score	Achievement in Music: Original Song
François Dompierre, The Alley Cat (Le Matou); Lewis Furey, Night Magic; Lewis Furey, The Peanut Butter Solution; Philippe Sarde, Joshua Then and Now	Lewis Furey and Leonard Cohen, "Angel Eyes" — Night Magic; Lewis Furey and Leonard Cohen, "Fire" — Night Magic; Lewis Furey, Eddy Marnay, Howard Forman and Judi Richards, "Michael's Song" — The Peanut Butter Solution; Michel Rivard, "Le temps nous depasse" — Jacques and November (Jacques et novembre); John Sebastian, "Nobody Cares Like a Bear" — The Care Bears Movie
Screenplay	Special awards
Sandy Wilson, My American Cousin; Mordecai Richler, Joshua Then and Now; Louise Rinfret and Claude Jutra, The Dame in Colour (La dame en couleurs); Lise Lemay-Rousseau, The Alley Cat (Le Matou)	Golden Reel Award: The Care Bears Movie
