= Emrys Jones (drama professor) =

Welsh professor (1905–1973)

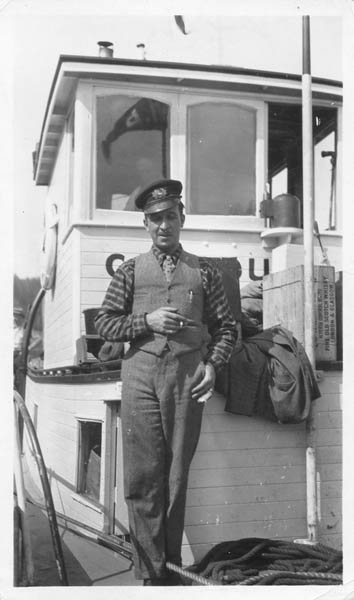
- Emrys Jones aboard the tug boat Canadusa on the Athabasca River in 1928
- Born: Emrys Maldwyn Jones; September 15, 1905; Dowlais, Wales
- Died: 1988 (aged 82–83)
- Other name: Emrys Maldwyn Jones
- Occupations: sailor, high school teacher, professor
- Known for: historic photos he took of Canada's north

When Emrys Jones was appointed professor of Drama at the University of Saskatchewan, in 1944, he is credited with being the first full professor of Drama at any University in the Commonwealth.

Jones is also known for rare historic photos he took in the late 1920s, when he worked aboard vessels working in Canada's sparsely settled North. Jones donated his photos to the University in the late 1960s.

Jones earned a B.A. from the University of Alberta in 1931. He spent the next eight years working as a high school teacher, before returning to University to complete his Masters and PhD. He earned his Masters at the University of Alberta. He earned a Rockefeller Fellowship, and studied for his PhD at Cornell University and Columbia University.

He became a fellow of the Royal Society of Arts in 1971.

He taught at the University of Saskatchewan from 1944 to 1971.

In 2008 Dwayne Brenna published an illustrated history of the Greystone Theatre, entitled Emrys' Dream: Greystone Theatre in Photographs and Words. Jones was the founding director of this Theatre.
