= Susan Wright (actress) =

Canadian actress (1947–1991)

- Born: October 22, 1947; Calgary, Alberta
- Died: December 29, 1991 (aged 44); Stratford, Ontario
- Occupation: Actor
- Known for: won two Dora Mavor Moore Awards and an ACTRA Award
- Relatives: Janet Wright (sister)

Susan Wright was a Canadian actress. Most prominently associated with stage roles, she also had a number of supporting roles in film and television.

She grew up in Saskatoon, Saskatchewan, and attended the University of Saskatchewan, where she performed at the Greystone Theatre. She left the university, however, without graduating. She co-founded the Persephone Theatre in Saskatoon, with her older sister Janet Wright, and brother-in-law Brian Richmond.

Wright frequently performed at the Stratford Festival in Stratford, Ontario in the 1980s, including roles as Mistress Quickly in The Merry Wives of Windsor, Queen Margaret in Richard III, Paulina in The Winter's Tale, Mrs. Webb in Our Town, the Citizen's Wife in The Knight of the Burning Pestle, Mother Courage in Bertolt Brecht's Mother Courage and Her Children, and Germaine Lauzon in Michel Tremblay's Les Belles-soeurs alongside her sisters Anne and Janet. In 1986 she appeared as Luce in a production of Richard Rodgers and Lorenz Hart's The Boys from Syracuse, which was filmed and televised by CBC Television. In 1991 she also starred in the title role in a touring production of Willy Russell's play Shirley Valentine.

She appeared in the theatrical films Christina, The Wars and Thick as Thieves, the television films Slim Obsession, Love and Larceny and I'll Never Get to Heaven, and episodes of Adderly, The Twilight Zone and Street Legal.

Over her career she won two Dora Mavor Moore Awards, for her performances in productions of Sam Shepard's A Lie of the Mind and John Murrell's New World, and an ACTRA Award for Slim Obsession.

She was staying in the Stratford home of Brent Carver, a close friend, with her visiting parents, when all three died in a house fire, in December 1991.
