= Sylvia (1985 Canadian film) =

- Directed by: Michel Murray
- Written by: Michel Murray
- Produced by: Yves Leduc
- Cinematography: André-Luc Dupont
- Edited by: Suzanne Allard
- Music by: Raffaele Artiglière
- Animation by: Michel Murray
- Production company: National Film Board of Canada
- Release date: August 29, 1985 (MWFF)
- Running time: 10 minutes
- Country: Canada
- Language: French

Sylvia is a Canadian animated short film, directed by Michel Murray and released in 1985. A satire of the modern family, the film blends live action and animation in its depiction of a bored housewife with a couch potato husband, a computer-addicted son and a punk rocker daughter, who escapes from her family life by imagining herself as the heroine in a romance novel.

The film was voiced by Denise Ally, Daniel Bérard and André Ducharme, with Mario Boucher, Caroline Gadoury, Michel Hébert and François Pierre Le Scouarnec appearing in the live-action segments.

The film premiered at the 1985 Montreal World Film Festival.

The film was a Genie Award nominee for Best Animated Short at the 7th Genie Awards in 1986.
