= Geneviève Rioux =

Québécoise television host and actress

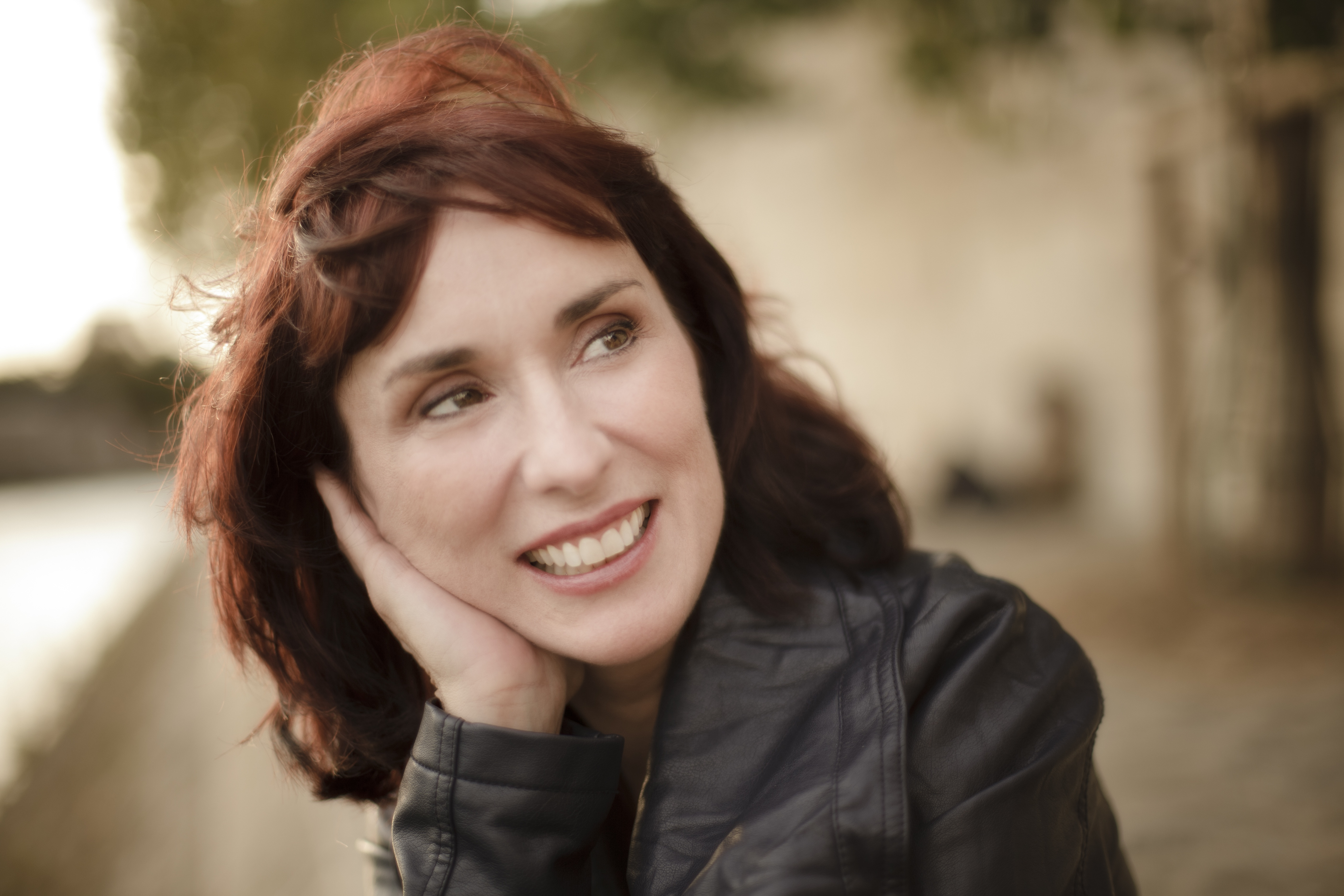
- Geneviève Rioux in 2011.
- Born: 3 November 1961 (age 64); Quebec City, Quebec, Canada
- Education: Conservatoire d'art dramatique de Montréal
- Occupation: Actor
- Years active: 1983–present
- Notable work: Le Déclin de l'empire américain; Cruising Bar
- Television: Chartrand et Simonne; Toute la vérité
- Awards: Prix Gascon-Roux; Prix Gémeaux ×2

Geneviève Rioux (born 3 November 1961) is a Québécoise television host and actor in theatre, television and film.

== Biography ==
Geneviève Rioux graduated from the Conservatoire d'art dramatique de Montréal in 1983.

In 1987 Rioux was nominated for a Genie Award for her second film role, Danielle in Le Déclin de l'empire américain.

In 1989 she won the Gascon-Roux Prize for best theatre actress in Roméo et Juliette. That year she also won the Prix Gémeaux for Best Female Performance in a Supporting Role – Dramatic for L'Héritage television series. Rioux won the Prix Gémeaux again in 2004 for her dramatic role in the series Chartrand et Simonne.

In the theatre, she interpreted the classical and contemporary repertoire. She has played in more than 30 pieces, including: Le prince des jouisseurs of Gabriel Sabourin, directed by Normand Chouinard; Rouge gueule of Étienne Lepage, directed by Claude Poissant; Un certain Stanislavski by Marcel Sabourin and Gabriel Sabourin, directed by Louis Choquette; Clash by Daniel Lemire, directed by Pierre Lebeau; Under construction by Charles L. Mee, directed by Luce Pelletier; Les grecques mounted by Luce Pelletier; Le jeu de l'amour et du hasard of Marivaux, edited by Danielle Fichaud; Le portier de la gare Windsor by Julie Vincent; Le Misanthrope by Molière, edited by Olivier Reichenbach; Shakespeare's Roméo et Juliette, edited by Guillermo de Andrea.

Geneviève Rioux conceived and co-wrote the documentary Crée-moi, crée-moi pas (English version: Impulses), directed by Marie-Pascale Laurencelle, produced by Marie-France Bazzo and broadcast on Télé-Québec in January 2013. The documentary competed at the Festival international du film sur l'art (FIFA) and won the "Audience Award" at the Brooklyn Girl Film Festival 2013.

Since 2001 Rioux has been a member of the women's committee of Union des Artistes, advocating for equal pay and against ageism.

== Works ==
=== Film ===
- 1985 - Summer Rain (Pluie d'été)
- 1986 - Qui a tiré sur nos histoires d'amour – Ginette
- 1986 - The Decline of the American Empire (Le Déclin de l'empire américain) – Danielle
- 1989 - Blue la magnifique – Doris
- 1989 - Cruising Bar – Sonia
- 1989 - Le Diable est une petite fille
- 1990 - Cargo – Alice
- 1991 - Montreal Stories (Montréal vu par...) – herself
- 1995 - Magical Flowers (Les Fleurs magiques) – Miche
- 2004 - Jack Paradise: Montreal by Night (Jack Paradise : Les nuits de Montréal) – Gisèle
- 2004 - Premier juillet, le film – Lise
- 2006 - La Lâcheté – Juliette
- 2011 - La Vérité – Caroline
- 2015 - Les bons sentiments – Carole
- 2017 - It's the Heart That Dies Last (C'est le cœur qui meurt en dernier) – Marie-Ève

=== Television ===
- 1987–1990 L'Héritage – Stéphanie
- 1994 La Glace et le Feu – Isabelle Duchesnay
- 1995–2000 Les Machos – Louise
- 2000, 2003 Chartrand et Simonne – Simonne Monet
- 2000–2004 L'art d'être parent – herself (host)
- 2001 Rivière-des-Jérémie – Ève
- 2003 Un gars, une fille – Isabelle
- 2004 À la découverte des haciendas – herself (host)
- 2005–2007 Les Poupées russes – Sophie-Catherine
- 2005, 2007 Casino – Monique
- 2007 Annie et ses hommes – Brigitte
- 2011–2012 Le tour du jardin – herself (host)
- 2013–2014 Toute la vérité – Maître Julie St-Pierre
- 2014–2017 Subito texto – Nicole Préfontaine

=== Theatre ===
Over 30 pieces, notably:

- Le prince des jouisseurs of Gabriel Sabourin, directed by Normand Chouinard
- Rouge gueule of Étienne Lepage, directed by Claude Poissant
- Un certain Stanislavski by Marcel Sabourin and Gabriel Sabourin, directed by Louis Choquette
- Clash by Daniel Lemire, directed by Pierre Lebeau
- Under construction by Charles L. Mee, directed by Luce Pelletier
- Les grecques mounted by Luce Pelletier
- Le jeu de l'amour et du hasard of Marivaux, edited by Danielle Fichaud
- Le portier de la gare Windsor by Julie Vincent
- Le Misanthrope by Molière, edited by Olivier Reichenbach
- Shakespeare's Roméo et Juliette, edited by Guillermo de Andrea.

== Awards ==
Won:

- 1989 – Prix Gascon-Roux – Best Theater Actress for Roméo et Juliette, TNM (Montreal)
- 1989 – Prix Gémeaux – Best Female Performance supporting role: Dramatic for L'Héritage (TV)
- 2004 – Prix Gémeaux – Best female lead actor: Dramatic for Chartrand et Simonne (TV)

Nominated:

- 1987 – Genie Award – Best Supporting Actress Award for Le Déclin de l'empire américain
- 2001 – Métrostar Award – Best Female Role in a Quebec TV series for Chartrand et Simonne
- 2004 – Métrostar Award – Best Female Role in a Quebec TV series for Chartrand et Simonne
- 2006 – Prix Gémeaux – Best Female Performance supporting role: Dramatic for the TV series Casino
- 2013 – Audience Award – for Crée-moi, crée-moi pas at the Brooklyn Girl Film Festival
- 2014 – Prix Gémeaux – Best Female Performance Supporting Role: Dramatic for Toute la vérité
