= Christine Pak =

Korean-Canadian former actress

Christine Pak is a Korean-Canadian former actress, who received a Genie Award nomination for Best Actress at the 7th Genie Awards in 1986 for her performance in the film 90 Days.

Originally from Seoul, South Korea, Pak's family moved to Vancouver, British Columbia when she was a teenager. She later competed in and won the Miss Korea of Canada pageant. She was not an aspiring actress, but won the role in 90 Days after driving her sister to the auditions and being invited to take part herself.

She subsequently had a small role in the film The Believers, and reprised her 90 Days role in the sequel The Last Straw. She did not continue working as an actress afterward.

== Filmography ==
- 1985: 90 Days - Hyang-Sook
- 1987: The Believers - Chinese couple
- 1987: The Last Straw - Hyang-Sook
