= 90 Days (film) =

1985 film by Giles Walker

- Directed by: Giles Walker
- Screenplay by: Giles Walker; David Wilson
- Produced by: Giles Walker; David Wilson
- Starring: Sam Grana; Stefan Wodoslawsky; Christine Pak; Fernanda Tavares
- Cinematography: Andrew Kitzanuk
- Edited by: David Wilson
- Music by: Richard Gresko
- Production company: National Film Board of Canada
- Release date: 23 August 1985
- Running time: 100 minutes
- Country: Canada
- Language: English

90 Days is a 1985 Canadian comedy film directed by Giles Walker and written by Walker and David Wilson. The film stars Sam Grana and Stefan Wodoslawsky as Alex and Blue, two unlucky-in-love guys who are trying to find new girlfriends. The film also stars Fernanda Tavares as Laura, a woman with a business proposition for Alex to become a sperm donor, and Christine Pak as Hyang-Sook, a Korean woman whom Blue is considering from a mail-order bride service.

The film was one of several "alternative dramas" produced by the National Film Board of Canada in the 1980s and early 1990s, which combined dramatic and documentary film techniques. The characters of Alex and Blue originated in the earlier film The Masculine Mystique, which used a docudrama format to explore various male perspectives on relationships with women.

The film received six Genie Award nominations at the 7th Genie Awards in 1986, for Best Picture, Best Director (Walker), Best Actress (Pak), Best Supporting Actor (Grana), Best Supporting Actress (Tavares) and Best Editing (David Wilson).

A sequel titled, The Last Straw, was released in 1987.
