= Sylvia Hamilton =

Canadian film director

Sylvia Hamilton CM ONS
- Education: Bachelor of Arts, Acadia University - Master of Arts, Dalhousie University
- Occupation: Filmmaker Writer Artist
- Notable work: The Little Black Schoolhouse

Sylvia D. Hamilton CM ONS is a Canadian filmmaker, writer, poet, and artist. Based in Grand Pre, Nova Scotia, her work explores the lives and experiences of people of African descent. Her special focus is on African Nova Scotians, and especially women. In particular, her work takes the form of documentary films, writing, public presentations, teaching, mentoring, extensive volunteer work and community involvement. She has uncovered stories of struggles and contributions of African Canadians and introduced them to mainstream audiences. Through her work, she exposes the roots and the presence of systemic racism in Canada. She aims to provide opportunities for Black and Indigenous youth through education and empowerment.

== Personal life ==
Hamilton grew up in Beechville, a community founded by the Black Refugees from the War of 1812, located west of Halifax, Nova Scotia. She was the second youngest child of six to Gerald and Marie Hamilton. Gerald was a labourer and Marie was a teacher in segregated schools. As a child in Beechville, Hamilton attended a segregated all-Black primary school and then switched to a non-segregated high school outside of her community. In this non-segregated school, Hamilton experienced what she called a “very alien environment.” For example, the history of Black people was absent from school textbooks throughout her years in high school and university. Hamilton went elsewhere to find a supportive Black community and found it in the African Baptist church. It was in this encouraging setting she was able to learn and cultivate public speaking skills, which she later used to spread her own experiences and those of others. She was the first person from Beechville to graduate from high school. She earned post-secondary degrees, namely a BA from Acadia University, an MA from Dalhousie University has been awarded three honorary degrees from Saint Mary's, Dalhousie and Acadia Universities.

== Career ==
She is an independent filmmaker who produces and directs films through her company Maroon Films. She is a professor at the University of King's College's School of Journalism.

Throughout her life she has served as a volunteer on many boards and committees including the advisory board for Dalhousie University's Transition Year Program (TYP) and its B&M (Indigenous Black and Mik’Maq) Law School Program both of which serve First Nations and African Canadian students. She was a member of the Dalhousie Art Gallery Advisory Board. In 1975, Hamilton joined Halifax's Reel Life Film and Video Collective. She worked for the secretary of state in race relations. Hamilton is the co-creator of the New Initiatives in Film (NIF) Program that was based the National Film Board of Canada’s Studio D; it was a program providing opportunities for women of colour and First Nations female filmmakers to create films.

She was a Trudeau Foundation Mentor in 2008, held a Distinguished Chair (Nancy's Chair) in Women's Studies at Mount St Vincent University, was Chair of the Women in Media Foundation, the James Robinson Johnston Chair in Black Canadian Studies and currently holds the Rogers Chair in Communications at the University of King's College School of Journalism.

She has held memberships with the Second Racial Equity Advisory Committee to the Canada Council, the Content Advisory Committee (CAC) to the new Canadian Museum for Human Rights, the Documentary Organization of Canada (DOC) and the Writer's Federation of Nova Scotia (WFNS). Hamilton holds the title of Inglis Professor Emeritus at the University of King's College.

Her poetry collection Tender was shortlisted for the 2023 Pat Lowther Award.

In October 2023, she was appointed a member of the Order of Nova Scotia for contributions to preserving the experiences of African Nova Scotians.

== The Little Black Schoolhouse (2007) ==
The Little Black School House is a documentary film written, directed, produced and distributed by Hamilton through her company Maroon Films Inc. The film reveals the little-known history of segregation in Ontarian and Nova Scotian schools. As detailed in the film, segregated elementary schools existed in Nova Scotia and Ontario because the education legislation in both provinces allowed for the set up of separate all-Black schools. In Nova Scotia, the legislation changed in 1954 to eliminate segregation while in Ontario it remained on the books until 1964. While most schools closed in Nova Scotia, the very last school closed in 1983. These laws reinforced geographic segregation creating Black and white Black school districts. In Ontario, the last segregated school closed in 1965.

The film illuminates the many consequences of the institutional racism that Black people experienced then and now. This included students dropping out because the non-segregated high schools were far away from Black communities and because the racism Black students experienced was paramount. Yet it also points to the dedication of teachers and parents to obtain equal education for their students. Hamilton writes extensively about experiences in “Stories from The Little Black School House.

== Methodology and approach ==
Hamilton’s documentary practice is marked by a focus on research and storytelling. She conducts her own primary research in the making of her films. In her work she draws on Pierre Nora’s concept of ‘sites of memory’, where meaning is invested in people, locations and events. She explores the inter-generational nature of racism through her use of old photographs juxtaposed with recent footage.

While she reveals pains that have elapsed over many generations and raises awareness of discrimination that still exists today, her films maintain a positive tone. She stresses, “where there is sadness in these stories, there is also great resilience.” This notion is reflected by her choice in music. For example, in her documentary, The Little Black Schoolhouse, composer Joe Sealy’s upbeat jazz score conducts the mood, inducing a sense of compassion and hope rather than pity or despair.

A colleague and fellow activist Pat Kipping comments on Hamilton’s ability to shift local, national and international perspectives on Nova Scotia. She remarks, “If they look at Sylvia’s films…they can’t see Nova Scotia as just New Scotland. They have to see it as a place that’s been built by many different peoples, especially Black Nova Scotians – a community that has been successfully made invisible by systemic racism for 300 years.” Her works function to tackle historical amnesia and shed light upon the persistent “colour line," a term used to illustrate the violent fissure between races made through centuries of colonialism. Scholars who have written about her work include Brianne Howard and Sarah Smith; Shana McGuire and Darrell Varga; and Sharon Morgan Beckford. Of her work Morgan Beckford writes: “Hamilton's cultural intervention into multicultural discourses unearths a paradox at the nexus of culture and democracy and social justice: while cultural and artistic intervention proves that multiculturalism enables inclusion of diversity, it paradoxically reveals the limits of multiculturalism in facilitating the conversion of that success into the kind of justice that enables social mobility of all groups, specifically blacks.”

== Filmography ==
- Black Mother Black Daughter (1989)
- Speak It! From the Heart of Black Nova Scotia (1992)
- Portia White: Think on Me (2000)
- The Little Black School House (2007)
- Making Movie History: Sylvia Hamilton (2014)

== Exhibitions ==
October 17-December 1, 2013. Excavation: A Site of Memory, Home/Land (with Wilma Needham) Dalhousie Art Gallery, Halifax, NS.

== Selected publications ==
Essays/articles:

- “Godmother” in Untying the Apron: Daughters remember Mothers of the 1950s. (Toronto: Guernica, 2013).
- “When and Where I enter: History, Film and Memory,” Acadiensis, Volume 41, Number 2, Summer/Autumn 2012.
- “Stories From The Little Black School House.” In Cultivating Canada: Reconciliation Through The Lens of Cultural Diversity. Edited by Ashok Mathur, Jonathan Dewar and Mike DeGagne. Ottawa: Aboriginal Healing Foundation Research Series, 2011.
- “Searching for Portia White,” in Rain/Drizzle/Fog: Film and Television in Atlantic Canada, Edited by Darrell Varga (NSCAD), University of Calgary Press, fall 2008.
- “Visualizing History and Memory in the African Nova Scotian Community,” in Multiple Lenses: Voices from the Diaspora Located in Canada, Edited by David Devine (Dalhousie University), 2007, Halifax.
- Entries on Portia White, Richard Preston and Africville, for The Oxford Companion to Canadian History, Oxford University Press, 2005.
- “A Daughter’s Journey,” Canadian Woman Studies /les cahiers de la femme, Volume 23, Number 2, Winter 2004.
- “Memory Writ Large: Film and Inquiry,” Sylvia Hamilton with Lorri Neilsen, in Provoked by Art: Theorizing Arts – Informed Inquiry, Backalong Books and The Centre for Arts-Informed Research - 2004.
- “What’s History Got To Do With It?“ Background Paper, commissioned by the Department of Canadian Heritage, Ottawa, March 2003.
- We’re Rooted Here and They Can’t Pull Us Up: Essays in African Canadian Women’s History. (University of Toronto Press, 1994).

Poetry appears in:

- West Coast Line
- The Dalhousie Review
- Fireweed
- To Find Us: Words and Images of Halifax
- The Great Black North: Contemporary African Canadian Poetry
- Temba Tupu:The Africana Woman’s Poetic Self-Portrait

== Awards and recognition ==
Her films have been broadcast on CBC, TVO, the Knowledge Channel and throughout schools and universities across the country. She has been honoured with numerous awards for her work, including a Gemini Award, the Japan Broadcasting Corporation’s Maeda Prize, the Progress Women of Excellence Award for Arts and Culture, the CBC Television Pioneer Award, and Nova Scotia's Portia White Prize for Excellence. She has presented her films and lectured widely in Canada, the United States, Europe, Africa and Jamaica.

- National Film Board Kathleen Shannon Documentary Award (Black Mother Black Daughter), Yorkton Short Film and Video Festival (1990)
- Rex Tasker Award for Best Atlantic Canadian Documentary (Speak It! From the Heart of Black Nova Scotia), Atlantic Film Festival (1993)
- Canada Award (Speak It! From the Heart of Black Nova Scotia), Gemini Award (1994)
- Association for Media and Technology in Education Festival Award of Excellence (1994)
- Maeda Prize, 21st Japan Prize, International Educational Program Contest, Japan Broadcasting Corporation (1994)
- CTV Fellowship Award, Banff Television Festival (1995)
- Honorary Doctor of Letters, Saint Mary’s University (1995)
- Race Unity Award, Baha'i Community of Canada (1996)
- Halifax Progress Women of Excellence Award, Arts and Culture Category (1996)
- Honorary Doctor of Laws, Dalhousie University (2001)
- Honorary Diploma, Nova Scotia Community College (2002)
- Nova Scotia Portia White Prize (2003)
- Silver Prize (Little Black Schoolhouse), Africa World Documentary Film Festival (2009)
- Best Film – People's Choice (Little Black Schoolhouse), African Diaspora Film Festival (2009)
- Honorary Doctor of Letters, Acadia University (2010)
- Queen’s Diamond Jubilee Medal (2012)
- Governor General's History Award for Popular Media (2019)
- Documentary Organization of Canada's DOC Luminary Award (2019)
- Order of Canada (2024)
