= John N. Smith =

Canadian film director and screenwriter

- Born: July 31, 1943 (age 82); Montreal, Quebec
- Occupations: Film director, screenwriter
- Years active: 1974–present

John N. Smith OC (born July 31, 1943 in Montreal, Quebec) is a Canadian film director and screenwriter.

== Career ==
Smith graduated with a B.A. in political science from McGill University in 1964. He joined the Canadian Broadcasting Corporation in 1968 as producer of The Way It Is, and the National Film Board of Canada in 1972 as a producer and director. In 1981 he directed First Winter, a short period drama that went on to be nominated for an Academy Award. He then made a string of feature-length docudramas that earnestly probed issues such as male sexuality (The Masculine Mystique), teen pregnancy (Sitting in Limbo), and immigration (Welcome to Canada). With collaborators such as Giles Walker, Smith made economic use of non-professional actors and documentary techniques. In 1993, he filmed The Boys of St. Vincent, a powerful and controversial television two-part drama depicting the sexual violation of children in a Catholic orphanage. Excellent reviews and ratings in the United States led to Hollywood assignments.

His work has been nominated in the Academy Awards, Genie Awards, and Gemini Awards, but has only won the latter. He is best known for the 1995 drama Dangerous Minds, starring Michelle Pfeiffer, the TV movie The Boys of St. Vincent, and his work on the TV miniseries The Englishman's Boy. Smith was appointed an Officer of the Order of Canada in 2008. He is married to filmmaker Cynthia Scott. Their son is actor Dylan Smith.

== Selected filmography ==
- "The New Boys" (episode of West, 1974)
- Ready When You Are (short film, with Douglas Kiefer, 1975)
- Happiness Is Loving Your Teacher (short film, 1977)
- Revolution's Orphans (short film, 1979)
- First Winter (short film, 1981)
- Gala (1982)
- The Masculine Mystique (1984)
- Sitting in Limbo (1986)
- Train of Dreams (1987)
- Welcome to Canada (1989)
- The Boys of St. Vincent (TV movie, 1992)
- Dieppe (TV miniseries, 1993)
- Dangerous Minds (1995)
- A Cool, Dry Place (1998)
- Random Passage (TV miniseries, 2002)
- Geraldine's Fortune (2004)
- Prairie Giant: The Tommy Douglas Story (TV miniseries, 2006)
- The Englishman's Boy (TV miniseries, 2008)
- Love and Savagery (2009)
