= Mort Ransen =

British-Canadian animator and director (1931–2022)

- Born: 16 August 1933; Montreal, Canada
- Died: 4 September 2021 (aged 88); Salt Spring Island, British Columbia
- Occupations: Director, writer, editor, producer
- Years active: 1961–2003

Mort Ransen (August 16, 1933 – September 4, 2021) was a Canadian film and television director, editor, screenwriter and producer, best known for his Genie Award-winning 1995 film Margaret's Museum.

== Early life ==
Ransen was born Moishe Socoransky to Ukrainian immigrants, the youngest of four children in the Yiddish-speaking household of Shimmel and Fanny (née Bordoff) Socoransky. He attended Baron Byng High School, where a teacher suggested that he pursue a career in acting. He left school after grade nine and went to New York, where he studied under the highly-regarded acting teacher Peggy Feury. He returned to Montreal, changed his name and began building an acting and directing career in theatre.

== Career ==
In 1960, Ransen was hired by the National Film Board of Canada (NFB). Over the next 24 years, he directed, wrote, edited and/or produced 21 films for the NFB. He also taught film studies classes at McGill University, where he gave his students cameras to create the celebrated 1968 film Christopher's Movie Matinee. He left the NFB in 1984 and directed film and TV projects for other producers. He then created two additional films produced by the NFB: Ah... the Money, the Money, the Money: The Battle for Saltspring, and his most successful film, Margaret's Museum.

Ransen was also credited for many years as director of the 1969 documentary film You Are on Indian Land. As a professional filmmaker and NFB employee, he had assisted film student Mike Kanentakeron Mitchell in making the film, but NFB policy at that time led to Ransen being credited as the director rather than Mitchell. Ransen always opposed that, saying that it was properly Mitchell's film, and the film's directorial credit was reassigned to Mitchell in 2017.

In 1997, Ransen moved to Salt Spring Island, British Columbia to live as a (self-described) 'hippie'. He did some theatre work and formed his own company, Ranfilm Productions, through which he created three more films, including the critically-acclaimed My Father's Angel.

== Personal life and death ==
Ransen was married twice and had four children. He had been with his partner, theatre director Libby Mason, since 2000. After developing dementia, Ransen spent the last year of his life in a care home and died in Saltspring Island’s Lady Minto/Gulf Islands Hospital on September 4, 2021.

== Filmography ==
- The Teacher: Authority or Automaton? - documentary short, NFB 1961 - director
- Jacky Visits the Zoo - short film, NFB 1962 - writer, director
- The Fatal Mistakes - training film, NFB 1963 - director
- Fighting Fit - training film, NFB 1964 - director
- Zero Point One - training film, NFB 1964 - director
- The Inner Man - documentary short, NFB 1964 - co-producer, co-director
- Among Fish - documentary, short NFB 1964 - co-director
- The Transition - documentary short, NFB 1964 - writer, director
- John Hirsch: A Portrait of a Man and a Theatre - documentary short, NFB 1965 - director
- Labour College - documentary short, NFB 1966 - director
- No Reason to Stay - short film, NFB 1966 - co-writer, co-editor, director
- The Circle - documentary, NFB 1967 - writer, director
- Christopher's Movie Matinee - documentary, NFB 1968 - editor, director
- Falling from Ladders - documentary short, NFB 1969 - editor, director
- Overspill - documentary short, NFB 1970 - director
- The Burden They Carry - documentary short, NFB 1970 - director
- Untouched and Pure - documentary, NFB 1970 - co-director
- Running Time - feature, NFB 1974 - writer, co-editor, director
- The Russels - short film, NFB 1978 - co-writer, co-director
- Bayo - feature, NFB 1985 - co-writer, director
- Mortimer Griffin and Shalinsky - short film, NFB 1985 - co-writer, director
- Street Legal - A Matter of Honour - series episode, CBC 1987 - director
- Shades of Love: Sincerely, Violet - video, Blackthorn Productions 1987 - co-director
- Shades of Love: The Emerald Tear - TV Movie, Blackthorn Productions 1988 - director
- Shades of Love: Tangerine Taxi - TV Movie, Blackthorn Productions, 1988 - director
- Falling Over Backwards - feature, Moving Image Productions 1990 - writer, co-producer, director
- Margaret's Museum - feature, NFB 1995 - co-writer, co-producer, director
- Touched - feature, Ranfilm Productions 1999 - co-writer, co-editor, producer, director
- My Father's Angel - feature, Ranfilm Productions 1999 - producer
- Ah... the Money, the Money, the Money: The Battle for Saltspring - documentary, NFB 2001 - writer, director
- Bastards - feature, Ranfilm Productions 2003 - writer, editor, producer, director

== Awards ==
Jacky Visits the Zoo (1962)

- International Festival of Films for Television, Rome: Second Prize, Silver Plaque, Children's Films, 1963

No Reason to Stay (1966)

- American Film and Video Festival, New York: Blue Ribbon, Personal Guidance, 1967
- Columbus International Film & Animation Festival, Columbus, Ohio: Chris Award, Education & Information, 1967
- La Plata International Children's Film Festival, La Plata, Argentina: Best Film of the Festival - Gold Plaque, 1968
- Annual Landers Associates Awards, New York: Award of Merit, 1966
- Melbourne International Film Festival, Melbourne: Diploma of Merit, 1967
- International Exhibition of Scientific Film, Buenos Aires: Diploma of Honour, 1968

Christopher's Movie Matinee (1968)

- Adelaide Film Festival, Adelaide Australia: Certificate of Merit 1970

Falling from Ladders (1969)

- International Festival of Short Films, Philadelphia: Award for Exceptional Merit, 1971

Untouched and Pure (1970)

- Chicago International Film Festival, Chicago: Silver Hugo, Education, 1965

Mortimer Griffin and Shalinsky (1985)

- American Film and Video Festival, New York: Red Ribbon, Literary Adaptations, 1988

Margaret's Museum (1995)

- San Sebastián International Film Festival, San Sebastián, Spain: Best Film, 1995
- Vancouver International Film Festival, Vancouver: Most Popular Canadian Film, 1995
- 16th Genie Awards, Toronto: Best Screenplay, 1996

My Father's Angel (1999)

- Leo Awards, Vancouver: Best Feature Length Drama, 2000
