= Lise Roy =

Canadian actress (born 1954)

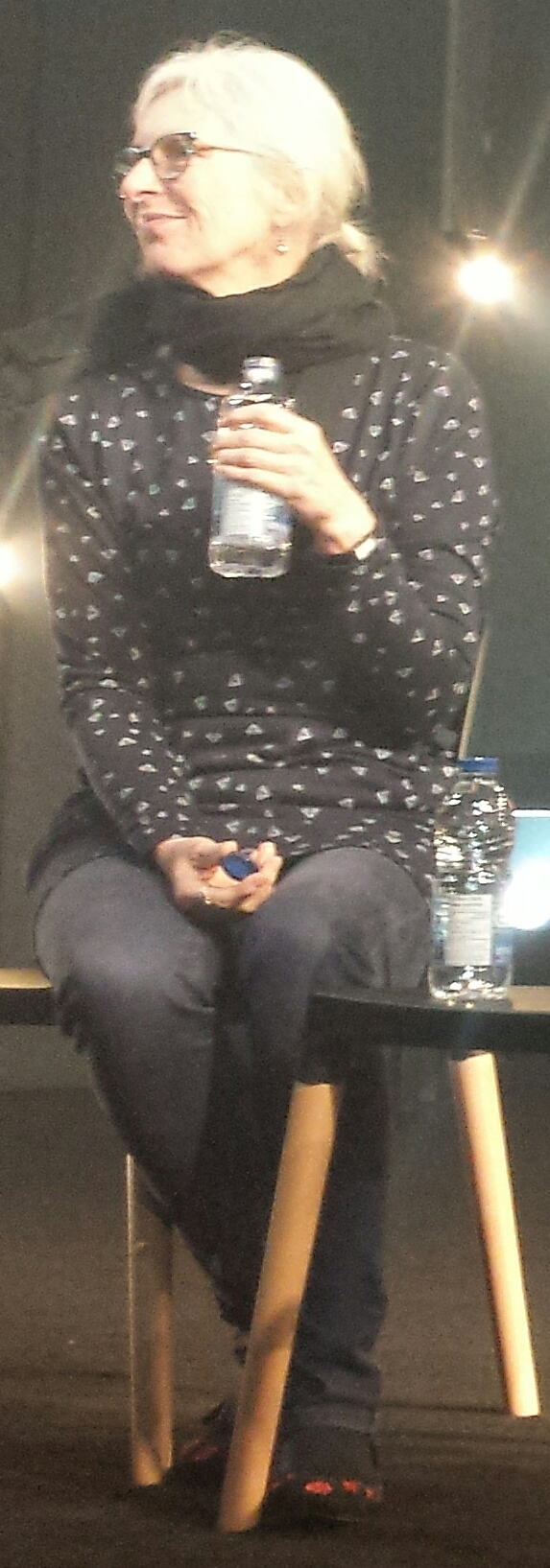
- Lise Roy at Licorne Theatre, Montreal.
- Born: 1954 (age 71–72)
- Education: Conservatoire d'art dramatique de Montréal
- Occupation: Actress

Lise Roy (born 1954) is a Canadian actress who has appeared in stage productions, film and television.

Roy graduated from the Conservatoire d'art dramatique de Montréal in 1975. In film, she worked with directors such as Denys Arcand, playing Mme. Joncas-Pelletier, the strict hospital manager in The Barbarian Invasions (2003); André Turpin in Endorphine (2015); and Podz in King Dave (2016).

Her television work has included Nouvelle adresse. On stage, she played Agathe in Michel Marc Bouchard's play Tom à la ferme, reprising the role in Xavier Dolan's 2013 film of the same name. After seeing the play, which Roy began performing in 2011, Dolan assured her he would not recast the role in the film. For the Tom at the Farm film, Roy won the Vancouver Film Critics Circle Award for Best Supporting Actress in a Canadian Film, and was nominated for the Jutra Award for Best Actress.

In 2016, she became a professor in theatre at the Université du Québec à Montréal.
