= John Blanchard =

Canadian television director and producer

- Occupation(s): Director and producer
- Years active: 1978–2008

John Blanchard is a Canadian television director and producer.

He is best known for his directorial work on the sketch comedy series SCTV, The Kids in the Hall, CODCO, MADtv and the talk show The Martin Short Show for which he won a Daytime Emmy Award for Outstanding Directing in a Talk Show.

He also directed episodes of the sitcoms Grounded for Life, Wanda at Large, Cavemen, and Unhitched, as well as a number of television films, one of his notable films being The Last Polka (1985) starring John Candy and Eugene Levy. He also directed the direct-to-video horror comedy Shriek If You Know What I Did Last Friday the Thirteenth.
