= Giles Walker =

Scottish-born Canadian film director (1946–2020)

Giles Walker (January 17, 1946 – March 23, 2020) was a Scottish-born Canadian film director.

== Biography ==
Giles Walker, born in 1946 in Dundee, Scotland, received a B.A. from the University of New Brunswick and an M.A. from Stanford University Film School in 1972. He joined the National Film Board of Canada soon after, directing documentaries, then switching to dramas in 1977. Bravery in the Field was nominated for a live-action short Oscar in 1979. The Masculine Mystique (directed with John N. Smith), the first of a trio of NFB movies dealing with issues of gender relations, showed Walker's experimental side, working with non-professional actors and the technique of improvisation. The two other films in the series, however, moved closer to an easy, palatable Hollywood style – successfully in 90 Days but less so in The Last Straw. Perhaps Walker's most successful fictional work is Princes in Exile, a film about a summer camp for children with cancer, notable for delicate treatment of the subject and a moving lack of sentimentality. Walker died in March 2020 after a 10-year battle with brain cancer.

== Partial filmography ==
Short film

Year	Title	Director	Writer
1979	Bravery in the Field	Yes	Yes
1979	Twice Upon a Time...	Yes	No

Feature film

Year	Title	Director	Writer	Producer
1984	The Masculine Mystique	Yes	Yes	Yes
1985	90 Days	Yes	Yes	Yes
1987	The Last Straw	Yes	Yes	Yes
1990	Princes in Exile	Yes	No	No
1993	Ordinary Magic	Yes	No	No
1996	Never Too Late	Yes	No	No
2001	Blind Terror	Yes	No	No

Television

Year	Title	Notes
1999	Little Men	1 episode
2001	Tales from the Neverending Story	2 episodes
2004	Fries with That?	11 episodes
2007	Doctor*Ology	2 episodes

== See also ==
- List of Bishop's College School alumni
