= Tony Nardi =

Italian-Canadian actor and playwright (b. 1958)

- Born: Antonio Luigi Nardi; 21 June 1958 (age 68); Carolei, Calabria, Italy
- Education: University of Toronto (M.A., 2016)
- Occupations: Actor, playwright, stage director
- Years active: 1978–present

Antonio Luigi Nardi (born June 21, 1958) is an Italian-Canadian actor, playwright, and theatre director based in Toronto. Fluent in four languages; he has appeared in French, Italian and English-language productions, including over 60 plays and 70 films and television series. He won the Genie Award for Best Performance by an Actor in a Leading Role twice, for The Saracen Woman (which he co-wrote) and My Father's Angel, with three additional nominations.

Two Letters (Letter One and Letter Two) received a Dora Award nomination for Outstanding New Play in 2007.. In 2008, Nardi received a Siminovitch Prize in Theatre (long list) nomination for playwriting for Letter Two. He has worked with Théâtre français de Toronto, Persephone Theatre, Great Canadian Theatre Company, and the Stratford Festival. He has also taught acting and directing courses at the University of Toronto and York University.

== Early life ==
Nardi was born in Carolei, Calabria in 1958, and moved to Canada as a child. He was raised in a multilingual environment, and is fluent in French, English, Italian and Calabrian.

== Acting ==
Nardi made his stage debut in a 1978 production of Solzhenitsyn, directed by Alexander Hausvater. Since then, he has performed in over 60 plays including For Those in the Peril on the Sea, Sandinista, Nineteen Eighty-Four, La Storia Calvino, A Flea in Her Ear and The Lesson.

He received a Montreal Gazette Critic's Award in 1979 for his role as O'Brien in George Orwell’s Nineteen Eighty-Four, adapted and directed by David Rhymer (Rimmer)., a Dora Mavor Moore Award for Artistic Excellence – Collective – in 1985 for La Storia Calvino, garnered a Dora Award nomination in 2001 for his role in A Flea in Her Ear, and a Dora Award in 2002 for Outstanding Performance for his role in The Lesson. In 2007 he received a Best Actor Thespis Award for Two Letters.

His movie roles include Caffè Italia, Montréal, Concrete Angels, Cruising Bar, The Saracen Woman (La Sarrasine), An Imaginary Tale, Mr. Aiello (La Déroute), My Father's Angel, Almost America, Corbo and Kiss Me Like a Lover (Embrasse-moi comme tu m'aimes), and his TV credits include Rossini's Ghost, Galileo: On the Shoulders of Giants, Bonanno: A Godfather's Story, Almost America, Il Duce Canadese and Indian Summer: The Oka Crisis.

A four-time Genie Award nominee, he has won twice for Best Actor for roles in The Saracen Woman (La Sarrasine) (1992) and My Father's Angel (2001), for which he had also received a Best Actor award at the Sonoma Wine and Country Film Festival in 2000. He received the Guy L’Écuyer Award for his role in La Déroute in 1998. In 2010, the year marking the 30th Genie Awards, he made the Academy's 30th Anniversary Top 10 list in the Lead Actor category in Canadian cinema – a ranking based on the number of wins and nominations over the 30-year period.

In television, he received a Gemini Award nomination in 2006 for his role in Il Duce Canadese and a Best Actor Award at the Geneva International Film Festival, Tous Écrans/All Screens, in 1999, for his role in Ken Finkleman's Foolish Heart.

== Writing ==
Nardi is co-author with Vincent Ierfino of the play La Storia dell'Emigrante. Written in Calabrian, English and French, the play was the first in Canada (on record) written by an Italian-Canadian and addressing an Italian-Canadian reality. In 1982 La Storia dell'Emigrante received the first James Bullet Award for Best Original Canadian play at the Ontario Multicultural Theatre Festival.

A Modo Suo: A Fable, written in Calabrian in 1990, received a Dora Award nomination for Best Play. An English translation was published in its entirety in the Canadian Theatre Review in 2000.

He collaborated on the screenplays for La Sarrasine and La Déroute.

Two Letters (2006), two theatrical monologues based on two actual letters sent to a film/television producer and two theatre critics, received a 2007 Dora Award Nomination for Outstanding New Play. "...And Counting!" - a postmortem of "Two Letters" and journey into the state of culture and funding in Canada was presented in 2008 in Toronto and Montreal, at Factory Theatre and McGill University, respectively and in 2010 at the Festival TransAmeriques in Montreal. In 2008 he was nominated for a Siminovitch Prize in Theatre for playwriting.

"Letter One", "Letter Two", and "...And Counting!" were filmed in front of a live audience and released respectively in 2011, 2013 and 2014. "Letter One" was screened at Les Rendez-vous du cinéma québécois in Montreal in 2011, at Hot Docs in Toronto in 2012 and the Italian Contemporary Film Festival at the Toronto International Film Festival (TIFF) in 2012. "Letter Two" was screened at the Italian Contemporary Film Festival at TIFF in 2013. "...And Counting!" was screened at the 2014 Italian Contemporary Italian Film Festival at TIFF.

In 2013, "Two Letters...And Counting!" was published by Guernica Editions (Essential Drama Series). In 2015 "Two Letters...And Counting!" was nominated for a Patrick O'Neill Scholarly Award. In 2024 "A Modo Suo (A Fable)" was published (in English and in Calabrian) in the anthology Canadian Plays of Italian Heritage edited by Anna Migliarisi and co-published by Guernica Editions and Rocco Galati.

== Academia ==
Nardi began teaching acting and directing courses in 2017. He has instructed courses at the University of Toronto (St. George and Scarborough) and directed courses at York University. On December 8, 2025, he successfully defended his PhD dissertation, Performing (in) the Multicultural Melting Pot and Otherculturalism, at the Centre for Drama, Theatre, and Performance Studies (CDTPS), University of Toronto, specializing in "the lived experience of 'diverse' performers in Canadian theatre, film and TV under the constitutionally protected Policy of Multiculturalism".

== Honors ==
In 1992, Nardi received the 125th Anniversary of the Confederation of Canada Medal, awarded to Canadians for significant contribution to their fellow citizens, to their community, or to Canada.

In 1997, Nardi received the prix Guy-L'Écuyer for La Déroute.

In 2001, Nardi received a "Toronto Italian Filmfest Award for Major Contribution to Italian-Canadian Cinema" at the Toronto Italian Film Festival (Frank. A. Caruso, co-founder and head programmer)

In 2002, Nardi was included in "Canadian Who's Who," "the standard reference source of contemporary Canadian biographies, listing 13,000 notable Canadians selected on merit alone."

In June 2017, Nardi received a "Special Achievement Award" at the Italian Contemporary Film Festival (ICFF) in Toronto.

== Personal life ==
Nardi lived in Montreal with Janne Mortil, his former partner, in 1999-2000.

== Filmography ==
=== Film ===
Year	Title	Role	Director	Notes
1981	Gas	Plant Manager	Les Rose	
1982	Deux super-dingues	Toto	Claudio Castravelli	
1983	Videodrome	Man at Conference	David Cronenberg	Uncredited
1985	Caffè Italia, Montréal	Various characters	Paul Tana	
1987	Concrete Angels	Sal	Carlo Liconti	
1988	Kalamazoo	Pasquale Globenski	André Forcier	
1988	Dreams Beyond Memory	Commercial Director	Andrzej Markiewicz	
1989	Cruising Bar	Marcello	Robert Ménard	
1989	Speaking Parts	Eddy	Atom Egoyan	
1989	Brown Bread Sandwiches	Rogero	Carlo Liconti	
1990	An Imaginary Tale	Toni	André Forcier	
1991	The Adjuster	Motel Manager	Atom Egoyan	
1992	The Saracen Woman	Giuseppe Moschella	Paul Tana	Also screenwriter
1993	Les Amoureuses	Nino	Johanne Prégent	
1994	Operation Golden Phoenix	Saul “The Lawyer” Silverstein	Jalal Merhi	
1996	La bruttina stagionata	Ian	Anna Di Francisca	
1998	Mr. Aiello	Joe Aiello	Paul Tana	Also screenwriter
1999	My Father's Angel	Ahmed	Davor Marjanovic	
2000	Cold Blooded	Vidal	Randy Bradshaw	
2001	Almost America	Vincenzo De Vito	Antonio Frazzi; Andrea Frazzi	
2008	Adoration	Principal Rollis	Atom Egoyan	
2011	Another Silence	Tony	Santiago Amigorena	
2011	Man on the Train	Loco	Mary McGuckian	
2012	Havana 57	Capt. Calzado	Jim Purdy	
2013	The Resurrection of Tony Gitone	Mario	Jerry Ciccoritti	
2014	The Big Fat Stone	Victor Rossi	Frank D'Angelo	
2014	Corbo	Nicola Corbo	Mathieu Denis	
2015	No Deposit	Det. Vincent Scartelli	Frank D'Angelo	
2015	Sicilian Vampire	Little Anthony	Frank D'Angelo	
2015	Born to Be Blue	Nicholas	Robert Budreau	
2016	Kiss Me Like a Lover	Élio	André Forcier	
2017	The Neighborhood	Shorty	Frank D'Angelo	
2017	Hochelaga, Land of Souls	Mario Ricci	François Girard	
2018	The Joke Thief	Francis Sellano	Frank D'Angelo	
2018	Bella Ciao!	Arnaldo	Carolyn Combs	
2019	The Last Big Save	Guy Bouche	Frank D'Angelo	
2019	Making a Deal with the Devil	Merant	Frank D'Angelo	
2019	From the Vine	Marcello	Sean Cisterna	
2019	Mafia Inc.	Zizi “Z” Zippo	Daniel Grou	
2019	Guest of Honour	Luigi	Atom Egoyan	
2021	Perpetual Motion	Carabinieri	Carlo Liconti	

=== Television ===
Year	Title	Role	Notes
1987-93	Street Legal	Schultz / Phil Carrera	2 episodes
1990-93	E.N.G.	Regossi / Frank Berman	2 episodes
1994	Side Effects	Peter	Episode: “The Great Chendini”
1997	Kung Fu: The Legend Continues	Alvin Barnes	Episode: “May I Talk With You”
1997	Viper	Pete	Episode: “Manhunt”
1998	Da Vinci's Inquest	François	4 episodes
1999	Foolish Heart	Judge James Schneller	2 episodes
2001	Foreign Objects	Bureaucrat	Episode: “The Award”
2003	Platinum	Nick Tashijan	Main cast; Season 1
2004	The Newsroom	Patrick	Episode: “Slow Burn”
2007	Intelligence	Nick Jordan	7 episodes
2009-10	Cra$h & Burn	Lindo	Recurring role; Season 1
2011	Flashpoint	Cary McCarty	Episode: “A Day in the Life”
2011-12	King	Chief Paul Graci	Main role; Seasons 1-2
2013	Motive	Father Noel Barnett	Episode: “Fallen Angel”
2013	Played	Chief Inspector	Episode: “Cops”

==== TV films and miniseries ====
Year	Title	Role	Notes
1993	Embrasse-moi, c'est pour la vie	Jean-René	
1993	Armen and Bullik	Spicuzza	
1996	Rossini's Ghost	Duke Cesarini	
1997	In the Presence of Mine Enemies	Emmanuel	
1998	Loss of Faith	Victor	
1999	Bonanno: A Godfather's Story	Joseph Bonanno (ages 35–61)	
2002	Escape from the Newsroom	Producer	
2004	Il Duce Canadese	Angelo Alvaro	
2006	Indian Summer: The Oka Crisis	John Ciaccia	
2011	Galileo: On the Shoulders of Giants	Michelangelo	
2015	Pirate's Passage	Immigration Officer (voice)	
2015	The Secret Life of Marilyn Monroe	Johnny Hyde	

== Awards and nominations ==
Institution	Year	Category	Nominated work	Result
Action On Film International Film Festival	2016	Outstanding Cast Performance - Feature	The Red Maple Leaf	Won
Action On Film International Film Festival	2018	Best Supporting Actor	The Joke Thief	Nominated
Canadian Screen Awards	2016	Best Supporting Actor	Corbo	Nominated
Gala Québec Cinéma	2016	Best Supporting Actor	Corbo	Nominated
Gala Québec Cinéma	2017	Best Supporting Actor	Kiss Me Like a Lover	Nominated
Gemini Award	2006	Best Performance by an Actor in a Leading Role in a Dramatic Program or Miniseries	Il Duce Canadese	Nominated
Genie Awards	1988	Best Performance by an Actor in a Supporting Role	Concrete Angels	Nominated
Genie Awards	1992	Best Performance by an Actor in a Leading Role	The Saracen Woman	Won
Genie Awards	1999	Best Performance by an Actor in a Leading Role	Mr. Aiello	Nominated
Genie Awards	2001	Best Performance by an Actor in a Leading Role	My Father's Angel	Won
Rendez-vous Québec Cinéma	1998	Best Performance by an Actor in a Leading Role	Mr. Aiello	Won
Wine Country Film Festival	2000	Best Actor	My Father's Angel	Won (Note: Tied with Brendan Fletcher for My Father's Angel.)
