= Devour! The Food Film Fest =

Annual film festival in Wolfville, Canada

Devour! The Food Film Fest (formerly the Slow Motion Food Film Fest) is a Canadian Film festival dedicated to films about food and wine culture. The five-day festival takes place annually in late fall in the Wolfville, Kings County, Nova Scotia. In 2020 organizers mounted a hybrid in-person and streamed festival due to Covid-19. Attendance was 1800 in person and 1600 virtual guests. Opening night celebrity host was "Phil Rosenthal" from the "Netflix" hit "Somebody Feed Phil". . Festival Dates for 2021 (an expanded hybrid festival) are October 19–24, 2021.

== History ==
The festival was founded in 2009 by Slow Food Nova Scotia. The first festival took place at the Al Whittle Theatre in Wolfville, screening 11 retrospective films with tickets sales of approximately 1,000. In 2011, 30 new films from around the world were screened, with ticket sales of about 2,000. Film director Robert Kenner (Food, Inc.) and Hollywood director-writer-actor Jason Priestley both participated in various capacities and now serve as Honorary Advisory Board Members. In early 2017, Canadian food writer Lucy Waverman and television food celebrity Bob Blumer also joined the Advisory Board.

In 2013, the event was re-branded to Devour! The Food Film Fest. 4,000 attendees took in 70 new food films from around the world, an opening night reception and gala film with special guests, a food truck rally, experiential wine and cheese tours, three five-course meals based on the films, a cocktail pop-up party, a cinematic dine-around brunch at the Wolfville Farmers Market, an awards showcase with a 15-part dessert constructed by culinary students and eight industry workshops.

In 2014, attendance increased to 6,120. The program involved of about thirty Chefs, many visiting filmmakers and industry guests, 14 workshops, 13 tasting tours, more than a dozen dinners, parties & events and over 50 new food and wine films from around the world. A number of local Acadian dishes were included. The event was opened by Anthony Bourdain, curating his favourite food film. Festival organizers were later presented with the Gary MacDonald Culinary Ambassador of the Year Award at the Taste of Nova Scotia Awards ceremony. Taking home the prestigious honour of the Gary MacDonald Culinary Ambassador of the Year Award, and were included on the Chronicle Herald's 2014 Arts & Life Honour Roll.

The fifth edition of Devour! The Food Film Fest took place in November, 2015. It was opened by actor Bill Pullman. The sixth edition of Devour took place November 2–6, 2016. It was opened by Chef Dominique Crenn and featured a theme celebrating the Power of Women in Gastronomy

In 2017 the Festival moved to a date earlier in October (25-29th). The 7th addition of Devour was opened by iconic Canadian actor Gordon Pinsent. Pinsent curated the opening night film The Hundred Foot Journey. The festival also hosted a special screening of Jacques Pepin: The Art of Craft by Director Peter Stein. Pepin was in attendance and provided insight into his long career. Notable Canadian Chef Michael Smith (chef) led a team of Canadian chefs for the Saturday evening Spotlight Gala that followed the World premiere of Canadian film Grand Cru with the director David Eng and star winemaker Pascal Marchand in attendance.

The 8th edition of the festival occurred October 23–28, 2018. Sam Kass, former chef to President Barack Obama, was the opening night curator. In 2018, 75 Films were screened, with more than 100 events in total. The Festival added events in Kentville, Nova Scotia and in 2019 will add events in Windsor, Nova Scotia

The 9th edition of the festival took place from October 22–27, 2019. Chef Lidia Bastianich was the guest curator. Actor Joe Pantoliano, star of the film From the Vine attended on opening night along with director Sean Cisterna. More than 80 films from around the world were screened, with a special focus on Italian cinema and Italian cuisine.

The 10th Anniversary of the festival took place on October 20–25, 2020 in a hybrid online and in-person format.

The festival also hosts or produces satellite events throughout the year in Osoyoos, BC, Berlin, Germany, at the Sonoma International Film Festival, The Bahamas, Long Beach, New York, Vero Beach, Florida at the Vero Beach Wine and Film Festival, the Jasper Park Lodge and more.
