= Italian Contemporary Film Festival =

Canadian film festival

ICFF
- Location: Toronto, Ontario, Canada
- Founded: June, 2012
- Festival date: June–July
- Language: English and Italian
- Website: www.icff.ca

The Italian Contemporary Film Festival (ICFF) is a Canadian, not-for-profit, publicly attended film festival in Toronto, Ontario, dedicated to contemporary Italian and international cinema through film screenings, premiers, industry events, and cultural programming. Founded in 2012, ICFF has grown from a four-day, single-venue festival of 18 films, to a 25-day, nine-city festival of over 130 feature films, documentaries and short films.

The festival's principal annual event, the Lavazza IncluCity Festival, takes place during the summer, beginning in June in celebration of Ontario's Italian Heritage Month. The ICFF also yearly runs the ICFF Youth Festival, special events and international programs, which aim to involve a constant multidisciplinary diverse audience, and promote cinema, art, music, fashion, food, and culture in multiple Canadian cities.

ICFF has hosted filmmakers, actors, and industry figures from Canada, Italy, and around the world. Over the years, they have welcomed important guests such as Roberto Benigni, Claudia Cardinale, Danny Glover, Giancarlo Giannini, Franco Nero, Giancarlo Esposito, Isabella Rossellini, Susan Sarandon, Ornella Mutti, Patrick Dempsey, among many others.

Due to the COVID-19 Pandemic in 2020, the 9th edition of the ICFF took place online. In both 2020 and 2021, in light of the pandemic, the ICFF and corporate sponsor Lavazza organized the special Lavazza Drive-In Film Festival, a screening series of films presented at a drive-in theatre at Ontario Place. The festival included some Italian films in its program, but programmed a diversity of films representing a broad cross-section of Canadian and international multicultural films rather than being exclusively Italian-themed.

In 2021, the ICFF introduced an open-air section of the festival at Trillium Park in Toronto, and in 2022, the festival fully transitioned to an outdoor format at the Distillery Historic District under the new name IncluCity Festival. The new format includes international and multicultural cinema screenings on the streets and main square of the Distillery District, as well as stages and street activations.

In 2023, the festival introduced a new section dedicated to dark drama and horror films called The Dark Side. This program features full-length films screened at midnight in the outdoor setting of the Distillery District.

In 2026, ICFF celebrated its 15th anniversary with an expanded edition running from June 25 to July 19th at Toronto's Historic Distillery District. The festival opened with Gabriele Mainette's The Forbidden City (La città proibita), and welcomed prominent guests including Patrick Dempsey and Ornella Mutti. The anniversary edition also marled the expansion of AiRTIFICAL VISIONS, first introduced as a pilot exhibition in 2025, into a moth-long immersive exhibition at Illuminarium.

== History ==
=== 2012 – 1st edition ===
- Films screened: 16 films
- Shorts screened: N/A
- Notable films featured: What a Beautiful Day/Che bella giornata, To Rome with Love, The Vanishing of Pato/La scomparsa di Patò, Basilicata Coast to Coast
- Opening film: Kryptonite!/La Kryptonite nella borsa, Directed by: Ivan Cotroneo, Italy
- Closing film: A Flat for Three/Posti in piedi in paradiso, Directed by: Carlo Verdone, Italy
- Cities: Toronto, TIFF Bell Lightbox

=== 2013 – 2nd edition ===
- Films screened: 34 films
- Shorts screened: 26 Shorts
- Notable films featured: Welcome Mr. President/Benvenuto Presidente!, Siberian Education/Educazione Siberiana, It Was The Son/ È stato il figlio, A Perfect Family/ Una famiglia perfetta, Viva L’Italia
- Opening film: Welcome Mr. President/Benvenuto Presidente! Directed by: Riccardo Milani, Italy
- Closing film: Come Undone/ Cosa voglio di più, Directed by: Silvio Soldini, Italy
- Cities: Toronto and Montreal

=== 2014 – 3rd edition ===
- Films screened: 25 films
- Shorts screened: 37 Shorts
- Notable films featured: The Best Offer/La migliore offerta, Those Happy Years/Anni felici, Like the Wind/Come il vento, First Snowfall/La prima neve, Sotto una buona stella
- Opening film: The Best Offer/La migliore offerta, Directed by: Giuseppe Tornatore, Italy
- Closing film: Stay Away From Me/Stai lontana da me, Directed by: Alessio Maria Federici, Italy
- Cities: Toronto, Montreal, Quebec City

=== 2015 – 4th edition ===
- Films screened: 28 films
- Shorts screened: 22 shorts
- Notable films featured: So Far So Good/Fino a qui tutto bene, I Can Quit Whenever I Want/Smetto quando voglio, The Legendary Giulia and Other Miracles/Noi e la Giulia, Leopardi/Il giovane favoloso
- Opening film: L’Oriana, Directed by: Marco Turco, Italy
- Closing film: Ever bene to the Moon?/Sei mai stata sulla luna, Directed by: Paolo Genovese, Italy
- Cities: Toronto, Montreal, Vaughan, Quebec City, Mississauga, Hamilton

=== 2016 – 5th edition ===
- Films screened: 32 films
- Shorts screened: 21 shorts
- Notable films featured: Quo Vado?, The Stuff of Dreams/La stoffa dei sogni, First Light/La prima luce
- Opening film: Quo Vado? Directed by: Gennaro Nunziante, Italy
- Closing film: The Correspondence/ La corrispondenza, Directed by: Giuseppe Tornatore, Italy
- Cities: Toronto, Montreal, Vaughan, Quebec City, Hamilton, Niagara

=== 2017 – 6th edition ===
- Films screened: 36 films
- Shorts screened: 25 shorts
- Notable films featured: Like Crazy/La pazza gioia, Flower/Fiore, Indivisible/Indivisibili, It's the Law/L’Ora legale
- Opening film: Something New/Qualcosa di nuovo, Directed by: Cristina Comencini, Italy
- Closing film: Like Crazy/La pazza gioia, Directed by: Paolo Virzì, Italy
- Cities: Toronto, Montreal, Vaughan, Quebec City, Hamilton, Vancouver

=== 2018 – 7th edition ===
- Films screened: 46 films
- Shorts screened: 29 shorts
- Notable films featured: There's No Place Like Home/A Casa Tutti Bene, Love and Bullets, Road To The Lemon Grove, The Last Prosecco/Finché c’è prosecco c’è speranza/, Tulipani: Love, Honor and a Bicycle
- Opening film: Like a Cat on a Highway/Come un gatto in tangenziale, Directed by: Riccardo Milani, Italy
- Closing film: Shape of Water, Directed by: Guillermo del Toro, Canada
- Cities: Toronto, Vaughan, Montreal, Quebec City, Ottawa, Vancouver, Hamilton, Niagara

=== 2019 – 8th edition ===
- Films screened: 47 films
- Shorts screened: 47 shorts
- Notable films featured: I am Mia/Io Sono Mia, The First King: Birth of an Empire/Il Primo re, From the Vine, The King's Musketeers/Moschettieri del re, Dogman
- Opening film: Dolceroma, Directed by: Fabio Resinaro, Italy
- Closing film: Greenbook, Directed by: Peter Farrelly, USA
- Guest film: Malamuri, Directed by: Federico Maio, Sicily
- Cities: Toronto, Vaughan, Montreal, Quebec City, Ottawa, Vancouver, Hamilton

=== 2020 – 9th edition ===
Postponed due the COVID-19 pandemic, the festival took place online from November 29 to December 8.

- Films screened: 18 films
- Shorts screened: 28 shorts
- Notable films featured: Aspromonte: the Land of the Forgotten/ Aspromonte - la terra degli ultimi, Tolo Tolo, Fellinopolis, Hidden Away/Volevo nascondermi, All My Crazy Love/Volare
- Opening film: Fellinopolis, Directed by: Silvia Giulietti, Italy
- Cities: Canada-wide online program

=== 2021 – 10th edition ===
The festival took place both with drive-in screenings and open-air events from June 19 to August 2.

- Films screened: 40 films
- Shorts screened: 28 shorts
- Notable films featured: Luca, The Best Years/Gli anni più belli, The Comebak Trail, My Boyfriend's Meds, Septet: The Story of Hong Kong, Out of My League/Sul più bello, Bye Bye Morons.
- Opening film: The Comeback Trail, Directed by: George Gallo, USA
- Cities: Toronto, Montreal, and online Canada-wide on the ICFF digital platform

=== 2022 – 11th edition ===
The festival took place mainly outdoors at the Distillery Historic District from June 27 to July 21. In addition, the festival hosted in-theatre screenings in Toronto and other major Canadian cities.

- Films screened: 61 films
- Shorts screened: 54 shorts
- Notable films: Marcel the Shell with Shoes On, Drinkwater, The Railway Children Return, Across the River and into the Trees, Una Femmina: The Code of Silence, The Great Silence.
- Opening film: Ennio directed by Giuseppe Tornatore
- Cities: Toronto, Montreal, Vaughan, Hamilton, Halifax and online Canada-wide on the ICFF digital platform

=== 2023 – 12th edition ===
The festival took place fully outdoors at the Distillery Historic District from June 27 to July 26 in Toronto, and other major Canadian cities.

- Films screened: 69
- Shorts screened: 27
- Notable films: Bank of Dave, Persian Lessons, The Night of the 12th, The Eight Mountains, Infinity Pool, Sweetwater, Diabolik: Ginko Attacks, BlackBerry
- Opening film: Freaks Out directed by Gabriele Mainetti
- Cities: Toronto, Montreal, Vaughan, Hamilton and online Canada-wide on the ICFF digital platform

=== 2024 – 13th edition ===
The festival took place at the Distillery Historic District from June 27 to July 21 in Toronto. The 25-day edition included more than 40 International, North American and Canadian premieres and featured a special celebration of Federico Fellini.

- Films screened: 53
- Shorts screened: 40
- Notable films: Finally Dawn, Born for You, Martedì e Venerdì, Napoli Milionaria, Zamora, Last Night of Amore, Seven Veils, Next Goal Wins, The Braid, A Little Something Extra
- Opening film: Finally Dawn directed by Saverio Costanzo
- Cities: Toronto, Montreal, Vaughan, and online Canada-wide on the ICFF digital platform

=== 2025 – 14th edition ===
The festival took place at the Distillery Historic District from June 27 to July 20 in Toronto. The 24-day edition welcomed over 61,000 attendees and included international film screenings, concerts, cultural panels, art showcases and special programming.

- Films screened: 47 19+25
- Shorts screened: 43
- Notable films: Napoli – New York, Familia, Diabolik: Who Are You?, U.S. Palmese, Diamonds, Treasure, Los Frikis, The Marching Band, Oh, Hi!, The Weekend, Song of the Fireflies, Juliet & Romeo
- Opening film:Napoli – New York, directed by Gabriele Salvatores
- Cities: Toronto, Montreal, Vaughan, and online Canada-wide on the ICFF digital platform

=== 2026 – 15th edition ===
The 15th anniversary edition of the festival took place at the Distillery Historic District from June 25 to July 19 in Toronto. The 25-day edition welcomed over 68,000 attendees and featured more than 50 films, alongside concerts, exhibitions, panel discussions, special events and soccer watch parties.

- Films screened: 49
- Shorts screened: 28
- Notable films: La Città Proibita , La Grazia, I Swear, The Rivals of Amziah King, The Last Viking, Le cose non dette, Le rêve américain , You Are Here: A Come From Away Story
- Opening film: La Città Proibita directed by Gabriele Mainetti
- Notable guests: Patrick Dempsey, Ornella Mutti, Yaxi Liu
- Cities: Toronto, Montreal, Vaughan, Hamilton and online Canada-wide on the ICFF digital platform

== Special Events ==
Part of ICFF's mandate is to celebrate Italian culture in all its aspects and each year ICFF organizes different events and initiatives to display renowned Italian traditions.

=== ICFF Industry Days ===
The Industry Days are an annual event which first launched in 2015. The event poses an opportunity for filmmakers and industry professionals to network and share ideas, which in past editions has led to collaborations and co-production projects. The Industry Days discuss the opportunities and challenges faced by the industry, startups and talent development. The day-long program includes panel discussions and industry professionals who discuss their experiences working on Italian-Canadian productions and share ideas for the next phase of co-productions between the two countries.

Guest speakers in recent years included: Academy Award-winning composer for Life Is Beautiful, Nicola Piovani; Oscar-winning producer and screenwriter, Nick Vallelonga, for Green Book; ILBE producer, Andrea Iervolino; actress Mira Sorvino; Academy Award-winning director of Piper, Alan Barillaro; and Academy Award-winning producer for The Shape of Water, J. Miles Dale.

Film institutions who participate in the event include Telefilm Canada, Ontario Creates, Take 5 Productions, The City of Toronto, Pinewood Toronto Studios, SIRT Sheridan, ICE - Italian Trade Commission, ANICA and Istituto Luce Cinecittà.

=== ICFF Architettura & Design ===
The annual event showcases the work and contributions from Italian architects and designers who have influenced this industry. The event includes a combination of film screenings and panel discussions where industry professionals share their outlook on new industry developments, challenges and upcoming opportunities.

=== ICFF Letteratura ===
ICFF Letteratura is an event that hosts poets, novels and poem writers who are the centre of a film or an important part of the story. The event aims to underline and celebrate the importance of Italian-Canadian writers and poets in Canada, giving them a platform to share their works.

=== ICFF in the Vineyard ===
This ICFF annual event brings together film, wine and food in partnership with Two Sisters Vineyards in Niagara-on-the-lake, Ontario. Its aim is to celebrate Italy's gastronomic culture, flavours and food traditions through a film screening that accompanies the experience at the vineyard. The evening features Two Sisters Vineyards wines accompanied by Italian dishes.

=== ICFF Call the Shots ===
Call The Shots is an annual event that celebrates and honours women's achievements in thought, leadership, and action. Call the Shots: Female Power Through Film tackles various themes and subject matter from the perspective of women who have achieved great success and become experts in their respective fields. In every aspect, in every field, and in every sector - be it filmmaking, journalism, the arts or industrial entrepreneurship - our guests represent the Canadian and Italian-Canadian women making an impact on their community and society as a whole.

=== Apericena at ICFF ===
Each year ICFF, in honour of TIFF, organizes a networking dinner-aperitivo night.

This is an event open to everyone in the industry and the Italian delegation at TIFF. Invitations are sent to celebrate Italian films in partnership with TIFF, as well as an early look at the next year's ICFF program.

=== ICFF Motori ===
The event brings together all car enthusiasts from both Italian and Canadian backgrounds, who have an interest in learning more about the history, culture and manufacturing through films and documentaries. ICFF hosts discussion opportunities with film directors and actors as well as panels for further exploration of the theme.

=== ICFF Arte ===
ICFF Arte is an annual initiative that showcases films and documentaries focused on some of the most influential Italian artists in modern and contemporary art.

=== ICFF Cucina ===
Every year ICFF Cucina honours the Italian culinary traditions through a program that combines film and food. ICFF presents movies and panel discussions about the most classic and traditional dishes that characterize the cuisine "made in Italy”.

=== ICFF Cycling ===
ICFF Cycling is an initiative that takes the audience on a tour which celebrates this very sport and the champions who made Italian cycling history.

=== ICFF Moda ===
ICFF Moda is an event that encompasses three important elements of the Italian experience: food, film and fashion. This initiative features a fashion show inclusive of local and notable Italian brands and designers, accompanied by short films focused on Italian fashion.

=== ICFF Befana in Vaughan ===
This event focuses on a longstanding tradition in Italian culture known as “befana”. The initiative takes place every year in Vaughan, where the day is filled with events and activities dedicated to children.

=== "AiRTIFICIAL VISIONS" ===
AiRTIFICIAL VISIONS is an immersive exhibition that explores the intersection of art, technology and artificial intelligence, showcasing innovative digital artworks and creative experiences from emerging and established artists.

== ICFF Youth Film Festival ==
ICFF Youth is the annual film program of ICFF that promotes film as an art form using the platform of International Cinema, while providing students (ages 8 to 18) with exposure to a variety of cultures and languages.

The program includes feature films, documentaries, animations and shorts. It provides educators with an alternate teaching strategy that respects a variety of learning styles.

The mission of ICFF Youth is two-fold:

1. To use cinema as a tool to enrich students’ analytical and critical skills while learning about key elements of the art of filmmaking.

2. To give students the opportunity to develop their knowledge of international cultures and languages while enjoying contemporary International Cinema.

Ten to fifteen movies are selected each year for screenings set in Vaughan, Richmond Hill, North York, Scarborough and Toronto. The films are screened in their original language (e.g. Italian, French, Mandarin, Cantonese, Spanish and Portuguese) with English subtitles. The program also provides pedagogical material associated with each film to all participating teachers. All suggested activities and strategies are based on the Ontario Curriculum which serves as a guide for all prepared educational material.

== Awards ==
=== 2012 – 1st edition ===
2012 Film Awards
No.	Award	Winner	Director	Country/Region
1	People's Choice Award	Kryptonite!	Ivan Cotroneo	Italy
2	IC Savings Award	The Vanishing of Pato	Rocco Mortelliti	Italy
3	Film Critics Award	Terraferma	Emanuele Crialese	Italy
4	Best Short	Pizza Bagel	Joe Mari	Canada

=== 2013 – 2nd edition ===
2013 Film Awards
No.	Award	Winner	Director	Country/Region
1	People's Choice Award	A Perfect Family	Paolo Genovese	Italy
2	IC Savings Award	Real Gangsters	Frank D'Angelo	Canada
3	Film Critics Award	Berberian Sound Studio	Peter Strickland	Canada
4	Best Short	Buongiorno Sig. Bellavista	Alessandro Marinaro	Italy

2013 Individual Awards
No.	Award	Winner	Title
1	Award of Excellence	Walter Nudo	Actor
2	Best Actor	Nicolas Vaporidis for Night Before the Exams	Actor
3	Special Achievement Award	Robert Loggia	Actor

=== 2014 – 3rd edition ===
2014 Film Awards
No.	Award	Winner	Director	Country/Region
1	People's Choice Award	Sotto una buona stella	Carlo Verdone	Italy
2	IC Savings Award	Stay Away from Me	Alessio Maria Federici	Italy
3	Film Critics Award	First Snowfall	Andrea Segre	Italy
4	Best Short	Bella di notte	Paolo Zucca	Italy

2014 Individual Awards
No.	Award	Winner	Title
1	Award of Excellence	Vittoria Puccini Steven Baldwin Danny Glover	Actress Actor Actor
2	Lifetime Achievement Award	Carlo Verdone	Actor
3	Special Achievement Award	Monika Bacardi	Producer
4	Best Actor	Enrico Brignano for Stay Away from Me	Actor
5	Best Screenplay	Martina Stella	Screenwriter, Actress
6	Special Award for Contribution to the Canadian Film Industry	Nick Mancuso	Actor

=== 2015 – 4th edition ===
2015 Film Awards
No.	Award	Winner	Director	Country/Region
1	People's Choice Award	The Legendary Giulia and Other Miracles	Edoardo Leo	Italy
2	IC Savings Award	The Colossal Failure of the Modern Relationship	Sergio Navaretta	Canada
3	Film Critics Award	The Invisible Boy	Gabriele Salvatores	Italy
4	Best Short	Due Piedi Sinistri	Isabella Salvetti	Italy

2015 Individual Awards
No.	Award	Winner	Title
1	Award of Excellence	Ficarra and Picone; Vincenzo Nisco	Actors Producer and Art Director
2	Lifetime Achievement Award	Roberto Benigni; Nicoletta Braschi	Actor; Actress
3	Award of Honor	Mischa Barton	Actress
4	Honour of Recognition as Italian Ambassador of Cinema in the World	Andrea Iervolino	Producer
5	Best Director	Marco Turco, L'Oriana	Director

=== 2016 – 5th edition ===
2016 Film Awards
No.	Award	Winner	Director	Country/Region
1	People's Choice Award	Quo Vado?	Gennaro Nunziante	Italy
2	Film Critics Award	They Call Me Jeeg Robot	Gabriele Mainetti	Italy
3	Best Short	Rèsce La Lune	Giulia Di Battista and Gloria Kurnik	Italy

2016 Individual Awards
No.	Award	Winner	Title
1	Award of Excellence	Gennaro Nunziante Checco Zalone	Director Actor
2	Lifetime Achievement Award	Claudia Cardinale	Actress
3	IC Savings Award for Best Producer	Andrea Iervolino	Producer
4	Special Achievement Award	Renzo Martinelli	Director

=== 2017 – 6th edition ===
2017 Film Awards
No.	Award	Winner	Director	Country/Region
1	People's Choice Award	At War with Love	Pierfrancesco Diliberto aka Pif	Italy
2	IC Savings Award	Piper	Alan Barillaro	United States
3	Film Critics Award	Fiore	Claudio Giovannesi	Italy
4	Best Short	Office Kingdom	Salvatore Centoducati, Eleonora Bertolucci, Ruben Pirito, Giulio De Toma	Italy

2017 Individual Awards
No.	Award	Winner	Title
1	Award of Excellence	Ruth Borgobello	Director
2	Lifetime Achievement Award	Christian De Sica	Actor
3	Special Achievement Award	Tony Nardi	Actor
4	Best Actress	Paola Cortellesi for Mom or Dad? and Something New	Actress
5	Trilogy Award	Danny Aiello, Giancarlo Giannini, Franco Nero for The Neighbourhood	Actors

=== 2018 – 7th edition ===
2018 Film Awards
No.	Award	Winner	Director	Country/Region
1	People's Choice Award	Tulipani, Love, Honour and a Bicycle	Mike van Diem	Canada
2	IC Savings Award	Road to the Lemon Grove	Dale Hildebrand	Canada
3	Film Critics Award	Couch Potatoes	Francesca Archibugi	Italy
4	Best Short	Framed	Marco Jemolo	Italy

2018 Individual Awards
No.	Award	Winner	Title
1	Award of Excellence	Giuseppe Battiston Fabio Rovazzi Daniel Baldwin Tobi Sebastian	Actor Actor Actor Actor
2	Lifetime Achievement Award	Claudio Bisio	Actor
3	Special Achievement Award	Antonio Albanese	Actor
4	Best Actor	Marcello Fonte for Dogman	Actor
5	Best Actress	Marta Gastini for Compulsion	Actress
6	Best Producer	Andrea Iervolino	Producer
7	Empire Community Award	J. Miles Dale, Dennis Bernardi, Nick Iannelli, Luca Nemolato, Roberto Campanella for The Shape of Water	

=== 2019 – 8th edition ===
2019 Film Awards
No.	Awards	Winner	Director	Country/Region
1	People's Choice Award	Io sono Mia	Riccardo Donna	Italy
2	People's Choice Award	Nati due volte	Pierluigi Di Lallo	Italy
3	IC Savings Award	From the Vine	Sean Cisterna	Canada, Italy
4	Film Critics Award	Daughter of Mine	Laura Bispuri	Italy
5	Best Short	Inanimate	Lucia Bulgheroni	Italy

2019 Individual Awards
No.	Awards	Winner	Title
1	Award of Excellence	Marco Giudici; Davide Cavuti; Marco Spagnoli; Sebastian Maniscalco	Broadcaster; Director; Director; Actor, Stand-up Comedian
2	Lifetime Achievement Award	Nicola Piovani	Composer
3	Special Achievement Award	Ezio Greggio Virginia Raffaele Piera Detassis Sara Polese	Actor, Comedian Actor, Comedian Journalist Producer
4	Empire Community Award	Nick Vallelonga for Green Book	Producer
5	Best Actress	Jennifer Dale for Into Invisible Light	Actress
6	Best Producer	Luca Barbareschi for Dolceroma, Modalità aereo, and Io sono Mia	Producer

=== 2020 – 9th edition ===
2020 Film Awards
No.	Award	Winner	Director	Country/Region
1	People's Choice Award	Aspromonte: Land of the Forgotten	Mimmo Calopresti	Italy
2	Best Documentary	Fellinopolis	Silvia Giulietti	Italy
3	Best Short	Matilde's First Day	Rosario Capozzolo	Italy

2020 Individual Awards
No.	Award	Winner	Title
1	Award of Excellence	Attilio De Razza	Producer
2	Special Achievement Award	Sarah Gadon	Actress
3	Best Actor	Riccardo Scamarcio for If Only	Actor
4	Best Actress	Ana Golja for The Cuban	Actress

=== 2021 – 10th edition ===
2021 Film Awards
No.	Award	Winner	Director	Country/Region
1	People's Choice Award	Out of My League	Alice Filippi	Italy
2	Empire Community Award	The Chain	Vittorio Rossi	Canada
3	Best Short Film	Slow	Giovanni Boscolo and Daniele Nozzi	Italy
4	Film Critics Award	You Came Back	Stefano Mordini	Italy

2021 Individual Awards
No.	Award	Winner	Title
1	Award of Excellence	Deanna Marsigliese, Enrico Casarosa, Moira Romano, Roberto Stabile	Character Art Director, Director, Producer, Head of International Relations, ANICA
2	Special Achievement Award	Vincenzo Guzzo	CEO Guzzo Cinemàs
3	Lifetime Achievement Award	George Gallo	Director
4	Best Actor	Jaime Camil for My boyfriend's Meds	Actor
5	Best Actress	Toni Colette for Dream Horse	Actress
6	Best Director	Alice Filippi for Out of My League	Director
7	Best Producer	Maurizio Paganelli for EST	Producer

=== 2022 – 11th edition ===
2022 Film Awards
No.	Award	Winner	Director	Country/Region
1	ICFF People's Choice Award	The Great Silence	Alessandro Gassmann	Italy
2	TFCA Prize	Ennio	Giuseppe Tornatore	Italy
3	IncluCity People's Choice Award	Marcel the Shell with Shoes On	Dean Fleischer-Camp	USA
4	IncluCity Jury Award	Across the River and into the Trees	Paula Ortiz	UK
5	Best Short	Deaf Love		

2022 ICFF Individual Awards
No.	Award	Winner	Title
1	Lifetime Achievement Award	Lino Banfi	
2	Best Actor	Fabio De Luigi	On Our Watch
3	Best Actress	Lina Siciliano	Una Femmina: The Code of Silence
4	Best Director	Manetti Bros.	Diabolik
5	Award of Honour	Alessandro Gassmann	The Great Silence
6	Special Achievement	Claudia Gerini	Tapirulan

2022 IncluCity Individual Awards
No.	Award	Winner	Title
1	Award of Excellence	Eric McCormack	Drinkwater
2	Best Actor	Hiroshi Abe	Tonbi
3	Best Actress	Ledisi	Remember Me: The Mahalia Jackson Story
4	Best Director	Stephen Campanelli	Drinkwater
5	Best Producer	Ericka Nicole Malone	Remember Me: The Mahalia Jackson Story

=== 2023 – 12th edition ===
2023 Film Awards
No.	Award	Winner	Director	Country/Region
1	ICFF People's Choice Award	The First Day of My Life	Paolo Genovese	Italy
2	TFCA Prize	The Eight Mountains	Felix Van Groeningen and Charlotte Vandermeersch	Italy
3	IncluCity People's Choice Award	Sweetwater	Martin Guigui	USA
4	IncluCity Jury Award	Eye for an Eye	Yang Bing Jia	China
5	Best Short	The Emptiness' Call	Nora Trebastoni	Italy

2023 ICFF Individual Awards
No.	Award	Winner	Title
1	Lifetime Achievement Award	Anna FendiMichele Placido	
2	Award of Excellence	Federica Luna Vincenti	Caravaggio's Shadow
3	Best Actor	Lorenzo Rilchemy	Diary of Spices
4	Best Actress	Micaela Ramazzotti	The Good Mothers, Caravaggio's Shadow
5	Best Director	Paolo Sodi	The Journey: A Music Special from Andrea Bocelli
6	Best Producer	Emanuela Rossi	Il grande giorno
7	Special Achievement Award	Mira Sorvino	Lamborghini: the Man Behind the Legend

2023 IncluCity Individual Awards
No.	Award	Winner	Title
1	Award of Excellence	Matt Johnson	BlackBerry
2	Best Actor	Rory Kinnear	Bank of Dave
3	Best Actress	Paola Sini	The Land of Women
4	Best Director	Brandon Cronenberg	Infinity Pool

=== 2024 – 13th edition ===
2024 ICFF Individual Awards
No.	Award	Winner	Title
1	Lifetime Achievement Award	Giancarlo Esposito Isabella Rossellini Rocco Papaleo	
2	People's Choice	Fabio Mollo	Nata Per Te
3	Best Actor	Edoardo Pesce	Martedì e Venerdì
4	Best Actress	Vanessa Scalera	Napoli Milionaria
5	Best Director	Neri Marcoré	Zamora
6	Best Producer/Production	Saverio Costanzo	Finalmente l'Alba
7	Film Critics	Andrea di Stefano	Last Night of Amore
8	Best Series	Lucio Pellegrini	Marconi. L'uomo che ha connesso il mondo

2024 IncluCity Individual Awards
No.	Award	Winner	Title
1	Award of Excellence	Atom Egoyan	Seven Veils
2	Best Actor	Alexandre Machafer	Jorge Da Capadócia
3	Best Actress	Kaimana	Next Goal Wins
4	Best Director	Miguel Ferrer	La Sombra del Sol
5	Jury Prize	Laetitia Colombani	The Braid
6	People's Choice	Artus	A Little Something Extra

=== 2025 – 14th edition ===
2025 ICFF Awards
No.	Award	Winner	Title
1	Lifetime Achievement Award	Susan Sarandon	
2	Best Picture Jury Prize	Francesco Costabile	Familia
3	People's Choice	Gabriele Salvatores	Napoli – New York
4	Best Actor	Francesco Gheghi	Familia
5	Best Actress	Matilda De Angelis	Siblings (La vita da grandi)
6	Best Director	Manetti Bros.	Diabolik: Chi Sei? , US Palmese
7	Best Producer/Production	Arturo Paglia, Isabella Cocuzza	Napoli – New York
8	Excellence	Geppi Cucciari	Diamanti

2025 Lavazza IncluCity Awards
No.	Award	Winner	Title
1	Jury Prize	Tyler Nilson, Michael Schwartz	Los Frikis
2	People's Choice	Treasure	Julia von Heinz
3	Best Actor	Eros De La Puente	Los Frikis
4	Best Actress	Molly Gordon	Oh, Hi!
5	Best Director	Emmanuel Courcol	En Fanfare (The Marching Band)
6	Excellence Award	Rachel Alejandro	Song of the Fireflies
7	Excellence Award	Meg Otanwa	The Weekend

=== 2026 – 15th edition ===
2026 ICFF Awards
No.	Award	Winner	Title
1	Lifetime Achievement Award	Ornella Muti	
2	Ambassador of Italy Abroad	Ornella Muti	
3	ICFF Icon Award	Patrick Dempsey	
4	Jury Prize	Gabriele Mainetti	La città proibita (The Forbidden City)
5	People's Choice Award	Paolo Sorrentino	La Grazia
6	Best Actor	Toni Servillo	La Grazia
7	Best Actress	Yaxi Liu	La città proibita (The Forbidden City)
8	Best Director	Gabriele Muccino	Le cose non dette (Things We Don't Say)
9	Best Producer/Production	Manuela Cacciamani	Il viaggio degli eroi (The Journey of the Heroes)
10	Excellence Award	Benedetto Habib	

2026 Lavazza IncluCity Awards
No.	Award	Winner	Title
1	Jury Prize	Kirk Jones	I Swear
2	People's Choice Award	Andrew Patterson	The Rivals of Amziah King
3	Best Actor	Mads Mikkelsen	Den sidste viking (The Last Viking)
4	Best Actress	Angelina LookingGlass	The Rivals of Amziah King
5	Best Director	Anthony Marciano	Le rêve américain (The American Dream)
6	Best Documentary	Moze Mossanen	You Are Here: A Come From Away Story
7	Best Short	Amir Zargara	Vital
8	AiRTIFICIAL VISIONS Excellence Award	Bianca Tse	
