= Kelime (film) =

2015 short film

Kelime is a 2015 short film directed by Federico Mudoni.

In 2016, the film received the Rai Cinema Channel Award at the XVII edition of the European Film Festival in Lecce.

== Plot ==
An order from above is the only thing that a dormant terrorist cell in Italy is waiting for to activate. However, the years spent in Italy cannot fail to have left a mark on those called to take an extreme symbolic action.

== Production ==
Produced by the production company Springo Studio in co-production with the "Da Vinci" Scientific High School of Maglie, the film is set between Salento and Istanbul. The narrative of the short film is very particular, as there are no dialogues at all. Hence the title "Kelime", specifically chosen to emphasize this concept, a Turkish word that means "Word". The title came from a question the screenwriters asked themselves: what word, heard through a phone, would be the one that would trigger the extreme action. What word would change his life forever. And the lives of others.

== Distribution ==
The film was selected for the following festivals:

- European Film Festival
- Salento International Film Festival
- Festival Internacional de Cine Independiente de Elche
- Italian Contemporary Film Festival
- International Short Film Festival Dino De Laurentiis
- Viva Film Festival Sarajevo
- Castro Film Festival
- Sciacca Film Fest
- Cort'O Globo Film Festival
- Lecce Film Fest
- Arroios Film Festival

== Soundtrack ==
The original song Kelime Soundtrack, which serves as the main theme of the short film, was written by Giacomo Sances. The voice accompanying the track is that of Serenella Colazzo.

== Awards ==
- 2015 - Salento International Film Festival
  - Best Italian Short Film
- 2016 - European Film Festival
  - Rai Cinema Channel Award
- 2016 - Castro Film Festival
  - Best Direction
  - Best Cinematography
