= Canadian Screen Award for Best Actor =

Retired annual Canadian media award

The Academy of Canadian Cinema and Television presents an annual award for Best Performance by an Actor in a Leading Role to the best performance by a lead actor in a Canadian film. The award was first presented in 1968 by the Canadian Film Awards, and was presented annually until 1978 with the exception of 1969, when no eligible feature films were submitted for award consideration, and 1974 due to the cancellation of the awards that year.

From 1980 until 2012, the award was presented as part of the Genie Awards ceremony; since 2013, it has been presented as part of the new Canadian Screen Awards.

From 1980 to 1983, only Canadian actors were eligible for the award; non-Canadian actors appearing in Canadian films were instead considered for the separate Genie Award for Best Performance by a Foreign Actor. After 1983, the latter award was discontinued, and both Canadian and foreign actors were eligible for Best Performance by an Actor in a Leading Role.

In August 2022, the Academy announced that it will discontinue its past practice of presenting gendered awards for film and television actors and actresses; beginning with the 11th Canadian Screen Awards in 2023, gender-neutral awards for Best Performance will be presented, with eight nominees per category instead of five. Lead performances are now honoured with the Canadian Screen Award for Best Lead Performance in a Film.

== 1960s ==
Year	Actor	Film	Ref
1968; 20th Canadian Film Awards
1968; 20th Canadian Film Awards	Gerard Parkes	Isabel	
1969; 21st Canadian Film Awards
1969; 21st Canadian Film Awards	No award presented this year		

== 1970s ==
Year	Actor	Film	Ref
1970; 22nd Canadian Film Awards
1970; 22nd Canadian Film Awards	Paul Bradley	Goin' Down the Road	
1970; 22nd Canadian Film Awards	Doug McGrath	Goin' Down the Road	
1971; 23rd Canadian Film Awards
1971; 23rd Canadian Film Awards	Jean Duceppe	Mon oncle Antoine	
1972; 24th Canadian Film Awards
1972; 24th Canadian Film Awards	Gordon Pinsent	The Rowdyman	
1973; 25th Canadian Film Awards
1973; 25th Canadian Film Awards	Jacques Godin	O.K. ... Laliberté	
1974
1974	No award presented		
1975; 26th Canadian Film Awards
1975; 26th Canadian Film Awards	Stuart Gillard	Why Rock the Boat?	
1976; 27th Canadian Film Awards
1976; 27th Canadian Film Awards	André Melançon	Bound for Glory (Partis pour la gloire)	
1977; 28th Canadian Film Awards
1977; 28th Canadian Film Awards	Len Cariou	One Man	
1977; 28th Canadian Film Awards	David Petersen	Skip Tracer	
1977; 28th Canadian Film Awards	Craig Russell	Outrageous!	
1977; 28th Canadian Film Awards	Marcel Sabourin	J.A. Martin Photographer (J.A. Martin photographe)	
1978; 29th Canadian Film Awards
1978; 29th Canadian Film Awards	Richard Gabourie	Three Card Monte	
1978; 29th Canadian Film Awards	John Juliani	Marie-Anne	
1978; 29th Canadian Film Awards	Frank Moore	The Third Walker	
1978; 29th Canadian Film Awards	Christopher Plummer	The Silent Partner	

== 1980s ==
Year	Actor	Film	Ref
1980; 1st Genie Awards
1980; 1st Genie Awards	Christopher Plummer	Murder by Decree	
1980; 1st Genie Awards	Geoffrey Bowes	Something's Rotten	
1980; 1st Genie Awards	Robin Gammell	Jack London's Klondike Fever	
1980; 1st Genie Awards	Thomas Hauff	Summer's Children	
1980; 1st Genie Awards	Stephen Lack	The Rubber Gun	
1981; 2nd Genie Awards
1981; 2nd Genie Awards	Thomas Peacocke	The Hounds of Notre Dame	
1981; 2nd Genie Awards	Jocelyn Bérubé	The Handyman (L'Homme à tout faire)	
1981; 2nd Genie Awards	Lewis Furey	Fantastica	
1981; 2nd Genie Awards	Winston Rekert	Suzanne	
1981; 2nd Genie Awards	August Schellenberg	The Coffin Affair (L'Affaire Coffin)	
1982; 3rd Genie Awards
1982; 3rd Genie Awards	Nick Mancuso	Ticket to Heaven	
1982; 3rd Genie Awards	Gabriel Arcand	The Plouffe Family (Les Plouffe)	
1982; 3rd Genie Awards	Gordon Pinsent	Silence of the North	
1982; 3rd Genie Awards	Christopher Plummer	The Amateur	
1982; 3rd Genie Awards	Winston Rekert	Heartaches	
1983; 4th Genie Awards
1983; 4th Genie Awards	Donald Sutherland	Threshold	
1983; 4th Genie Awards	Gilles Renaud	A Day in a Taxi (Une journée en taxi)	
1983; 4th Genie Awards	Saul Rubinek	By Design	
1983; 4th Genie Awards	Marcel Sabourin	Sweet Lies and Loving Oaths (Doux aveux)	
1983; 4th Genie Awards	August Schellenberg	Latitude 55°	
1984; 5th Genie Awards
1984; 5th Genie Awards	Eric Fryer	The Terry Fox Story	
1984; 5th Genie Awards	Pierre Curzi	Lucien Brouillard	
1984; 5th Genie Awards	Guy L'Écuyer	Au clair de la lune	
1984; 5th Genie Awards	Nick Mancuso	Maria Chapdelaine	
1984; 5th Genie Awards	Alan Scarfe	Deserters	
1985; 6th Genie Awards
1985; 6th Genie Awards	Gabriel Arcand	The Crime of Ovide Plouffe (Le Crime d'Ovide Plouffe)	
1985; 6th Genie Awards	Xavier Norman Petermann	Mario	
1985; 6th Genie Awards	Winston Rekert	Walls	
1985; 6th Genie Awards	Kiefer Sutherland	The Bay Boy	
1985; 6th Genie Awards	Kenneth Welsh	Reno and the Doc	
1986; 7th Genie Awards
1986; 7th Genie Awards	John Wildman	My American Cousin	
1986; 7th Genie Awards	Serge Dupire	The Alley Cat (Le Matou)	
1986; 7th Genie Awards	Ed McNamara	Bayo	
1986; 7th Genie Awards	Alan Scarfe	Overnight	
1986; 7th Genie Awards	R. H. Thomson	Samuel Lount	
1987; 8th Genie Awards
1987; 8th Genie Awards	Gordon Pinsent	John and the Missus	
1987; 8th Genie Awards	Pierre Curzi	The Decline of the American Empire (Le Déclin de l'empire américain)	
1987; 8th Genie Awards	Rémy Girard	The Decline of the American Empire (Le Déclin de l'empire américain)	
1987; 8th Genie Awards	Winston Rekert	The Blue Man	
1987; 8th Genie Awards	Kenneth Welsh	Loyalties	
1988; 9th Genie Awards
1988; 9th Genie Awards	Roger Lebel	Night Zoo (Un Zoo la nuit)	
1988; 9th Genie Awards	David Hemblen	Family Viewing	
1988; 9th Genie Awards	Jason St. Amour	Train of Dreams	
1988; 9th Genie Awards	Gilles Maheu	Night Zoo (Un Zoo la nuit)	
1989; 10th Genie Awards
1989; 10th Genie Awards	Jeremy Irons	Dead Ringers	
1989; 10th Genie Awards	Zachary Ansley	Cowboys Don't Cry	
1989; 10th Genie Awards	Elias Koteas	Malarek	
1989; 10th Genie Awards	Jan Rubeš	Something About Love	
1989; 10th Genie Awards	Saul Rubinek	The Outside Chance of Maximilian Glick	
1989; 10th Genie Awards	Ron White	Cowboys Don't Cry	

== 1990s ==
Year	Actor	Film	Ref
1990; 11th Genie Awards
1990; 11th Genie Awards	Lothaire Bluteau	Jesus of Montreal (Jésus de Montréal)	
1990; 11th Genie Awards	Maury Chaykin	Cold Comfort	
1990; 11th Genie Awards	Michel Côté	Cruising Bar	
1990; 11th Genie Awards	Michael McManus	Speaking Parts	
1990; 11th Genie Awards	Stephen Ouimette	The Top of His Head	
1991; 12th Genie Awards
1991; 12th Genie Awards	Rémy Girard	Love Crazy (Amoureux fou)	
1991; 12th Genie Awards	Brad Dourif	Chaindance	
1991; 12th Genie Awards	Matthias Habich	The Savage Woman (La Demoiselle sauvage)	
1991; 12th Genie Awards	Saeed Jaffrey	Masala	
1991; 12th Genie Awards	Jean Rochefort	Love Crazy (Amoureux fou)	
1992; 13th Genie Awards
1992; 13th Genie Awards	Tony Nardi	The Saracen Woman (La Sarrasine)	
1992; 13th Genie Awards	Jacques Godin	Being at Home with Claude	
1992; 13th Genie Awards	Don McKellar	Highway 61	
1992; 13th Genie Awards	Gildor Roy	Requiem for a Handsome Bastard (Requiem pour un beau sans-coeur)	
1992; 13th Genie Awards	Peter Weller	Naked Lunch	
1993; 14th Genie Awards
1993; 14th Genie Awards	Tom McCamus	I Love a Man in Uniform	
1993; 14th Genie Awards	Roy Dupuis	Cap Tourmente	
1993; 14th Genie Awards	Rémy Girard	La Florida	
1993; 14th Genie Awards	Gilbert Sicotte	Cap Tourmente	
1993; 14th Genie Awards	R. H. Thomson	The Lotus Eaters	
1994; 15th Genie Awards
1994; 15th Genie Awards	Maury Chaykin	Whale Music	
1994; 15th Genie Awards	Martin Drainville	Louis 19, King of the Airwaves (Louis 19, le roi des ondes)	
1994; 15th Genie Awards	Gary Farmer	Henry & Verlin	
1994; 15th Genie Awards	Elias Koteas	Exotica	
1994; 15th Genie Awards	Gilbert Sicotte	Les Pots cassés	
1995; 16th Genie Awards
1995; 16th Genie Awards	David La Haye	Water Child (L'Enfant d'eau)	
1995; 16th Genie Awards	Lothaire Bluteau	The Confessional (Le Confessionnal)	
1995; 16th Genie Awards	Matthew Ferguson	Eclipse	
1995; 16th Genie Awards	Clive Russell	Margaret's Museum	
1995; 16th Genie Awards	Peter Williams	Soul Survivor	
1996; 17th Genie Awards
1996; 17th Genie Awards	William Hutt	Long Day's Journey into Night	
1996; 17th Genie Awards	Jason Cadieux	Lilies	
1996; 17th Genie Awards	Matthew Ferguson	Lilies	
1996; 17th Genie Awards	Danny Gilmore	Lilies	
1996; 17th Genie Awards	Tom McCamus	Long Day's Journey into Night	
1996; 17th Genie Awards	Christopher Penn	The Boys Club	
1997; 18th Genie Awards
1997; 18th Genie Awards	Ian Holm	The Sweet Hereafter	
1997; 18th Genie Awards	Robin Aubert	The Countess of Baton Rouge (La Comtesse de Bâton Rouge)	
1997; 18th Genie Awards	Bruce Greenwood	The Sweet Hereafter	
1997; 18th Genie Awards	Peter Outerbridge	Kissed	
1997; 18th Genie Awards	Alan Williams	The Cockroach that Ate Cincinnati	
1998; 19th Genie Awards
1998; 19th Genie Awards	Roshan Seth	Such a Long Journey	
1998; 19th Genie Awards	Rémy Girard	Les Boys	
1998; 19th Genie Awards	Tony Nardi	Mr. Aiello (La Déroute)	
1998; 19th Genie Awards	Jonathan Pryce	Regeneration	
1998; 19th Genie Awards	Samuel West	Rupert's Land	
1999; 20th Genie Awards
1999; 20th Genie Awards	Bob Hoskins	Felicia's Journey	
1999; 20th Genie Awards	Gabriel Arcand	Post Mortem	
1999; 20th Genie Awards	Denis Bouchard	Winter Stories (Histoires d'hiver)	
1999; 20th Genie Awards	Joël Drapeau-Dalpé	Winter Stories (Histoires d'hiver)	
1999; 20th Genie Awards	Ralph Fiennes	Sunshine	
1999; 20th Genie Awards	Daniel MacIvor	The Five Senses	

== 2000s ==
Year	Actor	Film	Ref
2000; 21st Genie Awards
2000; 21st Genie Awards	Tony Nardi	My Father's Angel	
2000; 21st Genie Awards	David Cubitt	The Perfect Son	
2000; 21st Genie Awards	Colm Feore	The Perfect Son	
2000; 21st Genie Awards	Timothy Webber	My Father's Angel	
2000; 21st Genie Awards	James Whitmore	Here's to Life!	
2001; 22nd Genie Awards
2001; 22nd Genie Awards	Brendan Fletcher	The Law of Enclosures	
2001; 22nd Genie Awards	Zachary Bennett	Desire	
2001; 22nd Genie Awards	David La Haye	Soft Shell Man (Un crabe dans la tête)	
2001; 22nd Genie Awards	Peter Outerbridge	Marine Life	
2001; 22nd Genie Awards	Chris Owens	The Uncles	
2001; 22nd Genie Awards	Zinedine Soualem	Tar Angel (L'Ange de goudron)	
2002; 23rd Genie Awards
2002; 23rd Genie Awards	Luc Picard	Savage Messiah	
2002; 23rd Genie Awards	David Alpay	Ararat	
2002; 23rd Genie Awards	Philip DeWilde	Turning Paige	
2002; 23rd Genie Awards	Christopher Plummer	Ararat	
2002; 23rd Genie Awards	Colin Roberts	Flower & Garnet	
2003; 24th Genie Awards
2003; 24th Genie Awards	Rémy Girard	The Barbarian Invasions (Les Invasions barbares)	
2003; 24th Genie Awards	Raymond Bouchard	Seducing Doctor Lewis (La Grande séduction)	
2003; 24th Genie Awards	Philip Seymour Hoffman	Owning Mahowny	
2003; 24th Genie Awards	Robert Lepage	Far Side of the Moon (La Face cachée de la lune)	
2003; 24th Genie Awards	Barry Pepper	The Snow Walker	
2004; 25th Genie Awards
2004; 25th Genie Awards	Roy Dupuis	Looking for Alexander (Mémoires affectives)	
2004; 25th Genie Awards	Michel Côté	The Last Tunnel (Le Dernier Tunnel)	
2004; 25th Genie Awards	David La Haye	Battle of the Brave (Nouvelle-France)	
2004; 25th Genie Awards	Ian McKellen	Émile	
2004; 25th Genie Awards	Nick Stahl	Twist	
2005; 26th Genie Awards
2005; 26th Genie Awards	Michel Côté	C.R.A.Z.Y.	
2005; 26th Genie Awards	Adam Butcher	Saint Ralph	
2005; 26th Genie Awards	Marc-André Grondin	C.R.A.Z.Y.	
2005; 26th Genie Awards	Paul Kaye	It's All Gone Pete Tong	
2005; 26th Genie Awards	Luc Picard	Audition (L'Audition)	
2006; 27th Genie Awards
2006; 27th Genie Awards	Roy Dupuis	The Rocket (Maurice Richard)	
2006; 27th Genie Awards	Colm Feore	Bon Cop, Bad Cop	
2006; 27th Genie Awards	Olivier Gourmet	Congorama	
2006; 27th Genie Awards	Patrick Huard	Bon Cop, Bad Cop	
2006; 27th Genie Awards	Luc Picard	A Sunday in Kigali (Un dimanche à Kigali)	
2007; 28th Genie Awards
2007; 28th Genie Awards	Gordon Pinsent	Away From Her	
2007; 28th Genie Awards	Roy Dupuis	Shake Hands With the Devil	
2007; 28th Genie Awards	Marc Labrèche	Days of Darkness (L'Âge des ténèbres)	
2007; 28th Genie Awards	Claude Legault	The 3 L'il Pigs (Les 3 p'tits cochons)	
2007; 28th Genie Awards	Viggo Mortensen	Eastern Promises	
2008; 29th Genie Awards
2008; 29th Genie Awards	Natar Ungalaaq	The Necessities of Life (Ce qu'il faut pour vivre)	
2008; 29th Genie Awards	Paul Gross	Passchendaele	
2008; 29th Genie Awards	Rupinder Nagra	Amal	
2008; 29th Genie Awards	Christopher Plummer	Emotional Arithmetic	
2008; 29th Genie Awards	Aaron Poole	This Beautiful City	
2009; 30th Genie Awards
2009; 30th Genie Awards	Joshua Jackson	One Week	
2009; 30th Genie Awards	Jean-Carl Boucher	1981	
2009; 30th Genie Awards	Paul-Dylan Ivalu	Before Tomorrow (Le Jour avant le lendemain)	
2009; 30th Genie Awards	Clark Johnson	Nurse.Fighter.Boy	
2009; 30th Genie Awards	Stephen McHattie	Pontypool	

== 2010s ==
Year	Actor	Film	Ref
2010; 31st Genie Awards
2010; 31st Genie Awards	Paul Giamatti	Barney's Version	
2010; 31st Genie Awards	Jay Baruchel	The Trotsky	
2010; 31st Genie Awards	Robert Naylor	10½	
2010; 31st Genie Awards	Timothy Olyphant	High Life	
2010; 31st Genie Awards	François Papineau	Route 132	
2011; 32nd Genie Awards
2011; 32nd Genie Awards	Mohamed Fellag	Monsieur Lazhar	
2011; 32nd Genie Awards	Garret Dillahunt	Oliver Sherman	
2011; 32nd Genie Awards	Michael Fassbender	A Dangerous Method	
2011; 32nd Genie Awards	Patrick Huard	Starbuck	
2011; 32nd Genie Awards	Scott Speedman	Citizen Gangster	
2012; 1st Canadian Screen Awards
2012; 1st Canadian Screen Awards	James Cromwell	Still Mine	
2012; 1st Canadian Screen Awards	Patrick Drolet	All That You Possess (Tout ce que tu possèdes)	
2012; 1st Canadian Screen Awards	Marc-André Grondin	L'Affaire Dumont	
2012; 1st Canadian Screen Awards	David Morse	Collaborator	
2012; 1st Canadian Screen Awards	Melvil Poupaud	Laurence Anyways	
2013; 2nd Canadian Screen Awards
2013; 2nd Canadian Screen Awards	Gabriel Arcand	The Dismantling (Le Démantèlement)	
2013; 2nd Canadian Screen Awards	Brendan Gleeson	The Grand Seduction	
2013; 2nd Canadian Screen Awards	Jake Gyllenhaal	Enemy	
2013; 2nd Canadian Screen Awards	Daniel Radcliffe	The F Word	
2013; 2nd Canadian Screen Awards	Rajesh Tailang	Siddharth	
2014; 3rd Canadian Screen Awards
2014; 3rd Canadian Screen Awards	Antoine Olivier Pilon	Mommy	
2014; 3rd Canadian Screen Awards	Evan Bird	Maps to the Stars	
2014; 3rd Canadian Screen Awards	Bruce Greenwood	Elephant Song	
2014; 3rd Canadian Screen Awards	Michael Murphy	Fall	
2014; 3rd Canadian Screen Awards	Ryan Reynolds	The Captive	
2015; 4th Canadian Screen Awards
2015; 4th Canadian Screen Awards	Jacob Tremblay	Room	
2015; 4th Canadian Screen Awards	Maxim Gaudette	Our Loved Ones (Les Êtres chers)	
2015; 4th Canadian Screen Awards	Jasmin Geljo	The Waiting Room	
2015; 4th Canadian Screen Awards	Christopher Plummer	Remember	
2015; 4th Canadian Screen Awards	Rossif Sutherland	River	
2016; 5th Canadian Screen Awards
2016; 5th Canadian Screen Awards	Stephan James	Race	
2016; 5th Canadian Screen Awards	Jared Abrahamson	Hello Destroyer	
2016; 5th Canadian Screen Awards	Lawrence Barry	Riverhead	
2016; 5th Canadian Screen Awards	Chen Gang	Old Stone	
2016; 5th Canadian Screen Awards	Andrew Gillis	Werewolf	
2017; 6th Canadian Screen Awards
2017; 6th Canadian Screen Awards	Nabil Rajo	Boost	
2017; 6th Canadian Screen Awards	Antoine L'Écuyer	The Little Girl Who Was Too Fond of Matches (La petite fille qui aimait trop les allumettes)	
2017; 6th Canadian Screen Awards	Tzi Ma	Meditation Park	
2017; 6th Canadian Screen Awards	Émile Proulx-Cloutier	We Are the Others (Nous sommes les autres)	
2017; 6th Canadian Screen Awards	Gabriel Sabourin	It's the Heart That Dies Last (C'est le cœur qui meurt en dernier)	
2018; 7th Canadian Screen Awards
2018; 7th Canadian Screen Awards	Théodore Pellerin	Family First (Chien de garde)	
2018; 7th Canadian Screen Awards	Martin Dubreuil	The Great Darkened Days (La grande noirceur)	
2018; 7th Canadian Screen Awards	Paul Nutarariaq	The Grizzlies	
2018; 7th Canadian Screen Awards	Brandon Oakes	Through Black Spruce	
2018; 7th Canadian Screen Awards	Michael Rowe	Crown and Anchor	
2019; 8th Canadian Screen Awards
2019; 8th Canadian Screen Awards	Mark O'Brien	Goalie	
2019; 8th Canadian Screen Awards	Dan Beirne	The Twentieth Century	
2019; 8th Canadian Screen Awards	Marc-André Grondin	Mafia Inc.	
2019; 8th Canadian Screen Awards	Ryan McDonald	Black Conflux	
2019; 8th Canadian Screen Awards	Gilbert Sicotte	And the Birds Rained Down (Il pleuvait des oiseaux)	

== 2020s ==
Year	Actor	Film	Ref
2020; 9th Canadian Screen Awards
2020; 9th Canadian Screen Awards	Michael Greyeyes	Blood Quantum	
2020; 9th Canadian Screen Awards	Lance Henriksen	Falling	
2020; 9th Canadian Screen Awards	Joakim Robillard	Underground (Souterrain)	
2020; 9th Canadian Screen Awards	Saul Williams	Akilla's Escape	
2020; 9th Canadian Screen Awards	Alex Wolff	Castle in the Ground	
2021; 10th Canadian Screen Awards
2021; 10th Canadian Screen Awards	Liam Diaz	Scarborough	
2021; 10th Canadian Screen Awards	Rogelio Balagtas	Islands	
2021; 10th Canadian Screen Awards	Pavle Čemerikić	The White Fortress (Tabija)	
2021; 10th Canadian Screen Awards	Phillip Lewitski	Wildhood	
2021; 10th Canadian Screen Awards	Thomas Antony Olajide	Learn to Swim	

== See also ==
- Prix Iris for Best Actor
