= Orfeo Reda =

Italian painter (1932–2025)

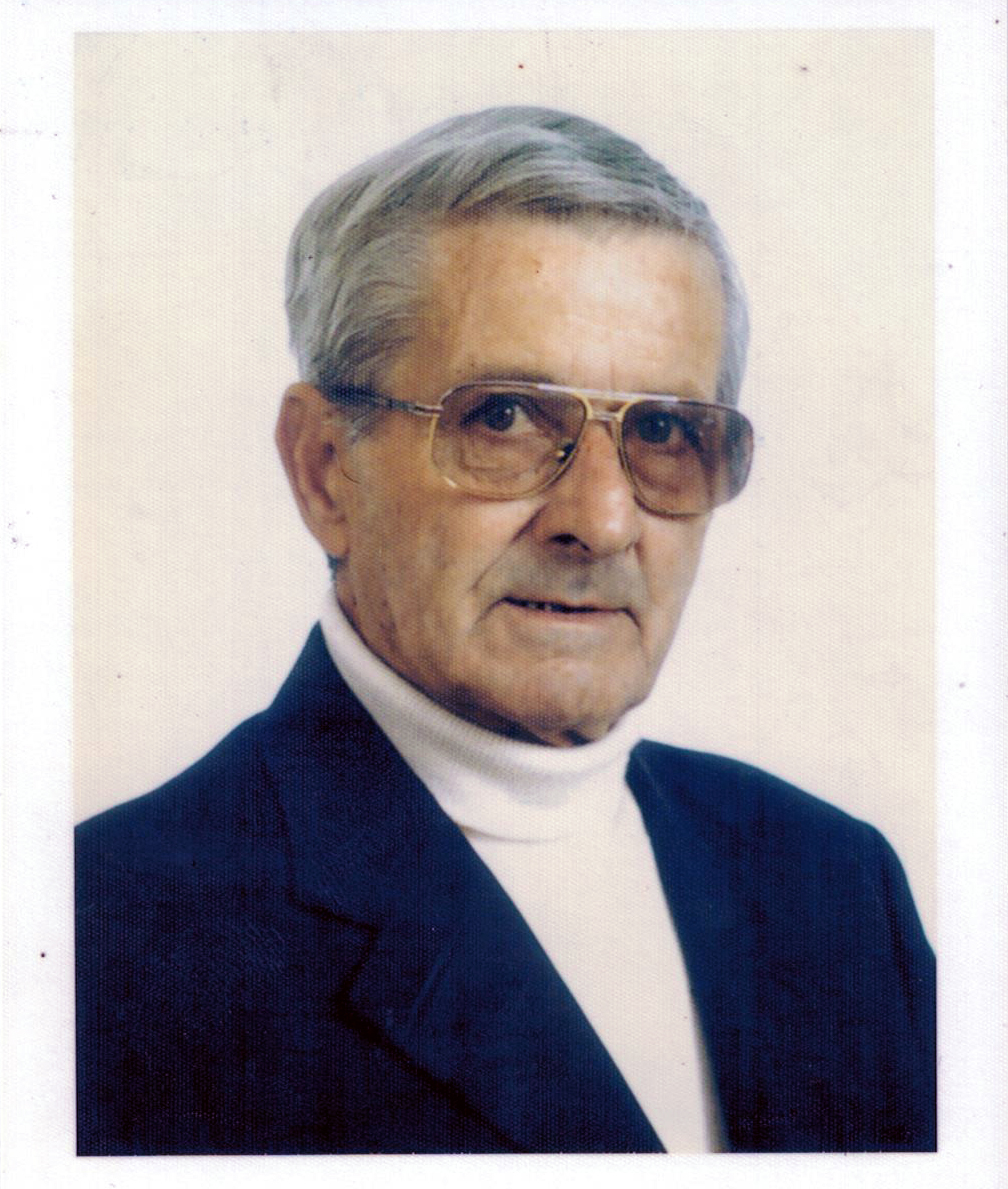
- Reda in 2020
- Born: 9 November 1932; Carolei, Italy
- Died: 5 October 2025 (aged 92); Amantea, Italy
- Education: Liceo Artistico Mattia Preti
- Known for: Painting
- Awards: Riace Bronzes Prize in Reggio Calabria; Drach Prize in Palma de Majorca; Kowloon Prize in Hong Kong
- Patrons: Alfonso Francipane

Orfeo Reda (9 November 1932 – 5 October 2025) was an Italian visual artist, who is most known as a painter.

== Life and career ==
Reda was born in Pantanolungo di Carolei on 9 November 1932, to a homemaker mother and a father who was a farmer and veteran of the First World War. At 16, he won first prize at the Fiera Campionaria in Cosenza with a scholarship offered by the Chamber of Commerce. He completed his maturity at the Art Institute and his drawing diploma at the Liceo Artistico Mattia Preti in Reggio Calabria under the guidance of the illustrious Art Historian Professor Alfonso Francipane.

He then dedicated himself to the teaching of artistic disciplines such as: Drawing and History of Art at the Higher Middle Schools and Artistic Education at the Middle Schools. He carried out his activity as a painter in his studio in Amantea where he lived for many years.

His works appear in public collections all over the world and numerous are the prizes awarded to the artist, such as: Riace Bronzes Prize in Reggio Calabria; Masters of Italian art trophy in Salsomaggiore; Drach Prize in Palma de Majorca; Kowloon Prize in Hong Kong; Expo arte Tirrenia 20th edition (where the artist was awarded by the President of the Republic of Malta).

Reda died on 5 October 2025, at the age of 92.

== Painting exhibitions ==
- Accademia D'Europa, Naples (1985)
- Local Prize "il Glicine", Amantea, with blessing of the Holy See (1986)
- Eur Art Expo, Rome (1989)
- Premio Palazzo Reale Malta, Valletta
- Pantheon d'Oro - Bologna (1992)
- Florence Paint Exhibition, Florence (1994)
- Mostra Antologica - Galleria Amedeo Modigliani, Milan (1995)
- 56th Venice Biennale, Venice (2015)

== Gallery ==
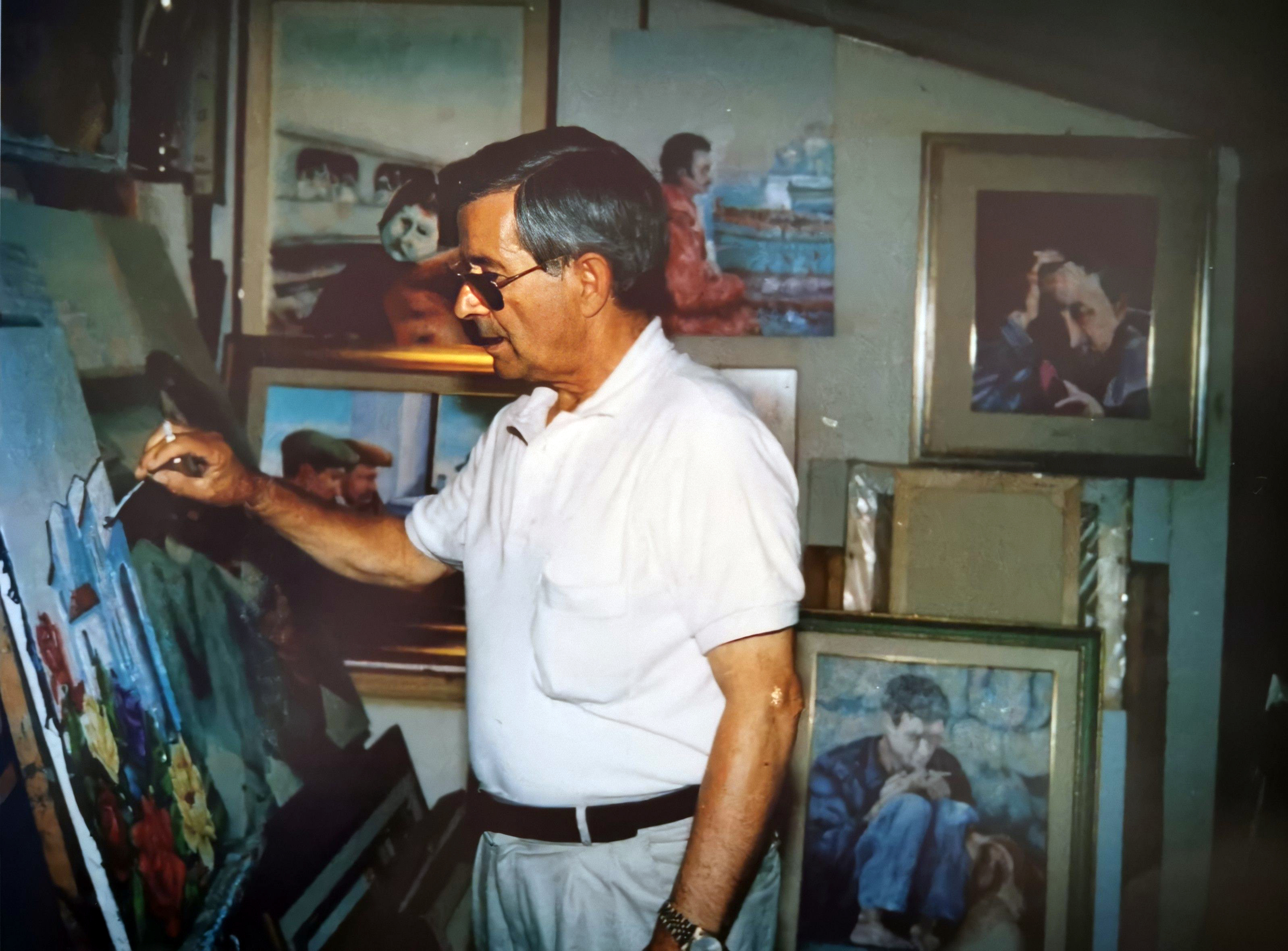
Orfeo Reda in his studio

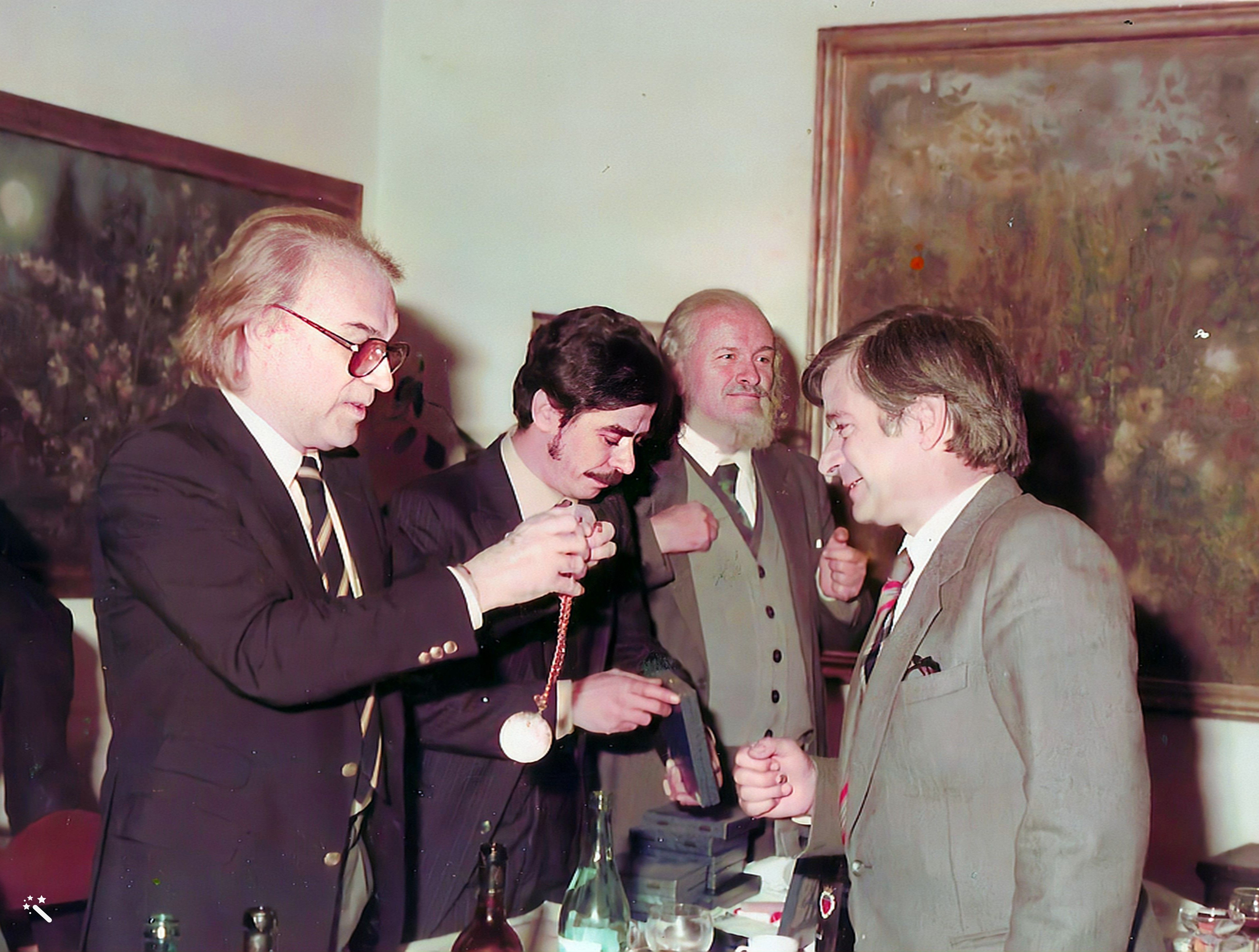
Giorgio Albertazzi awards Orfeo Reda, Florence 1993

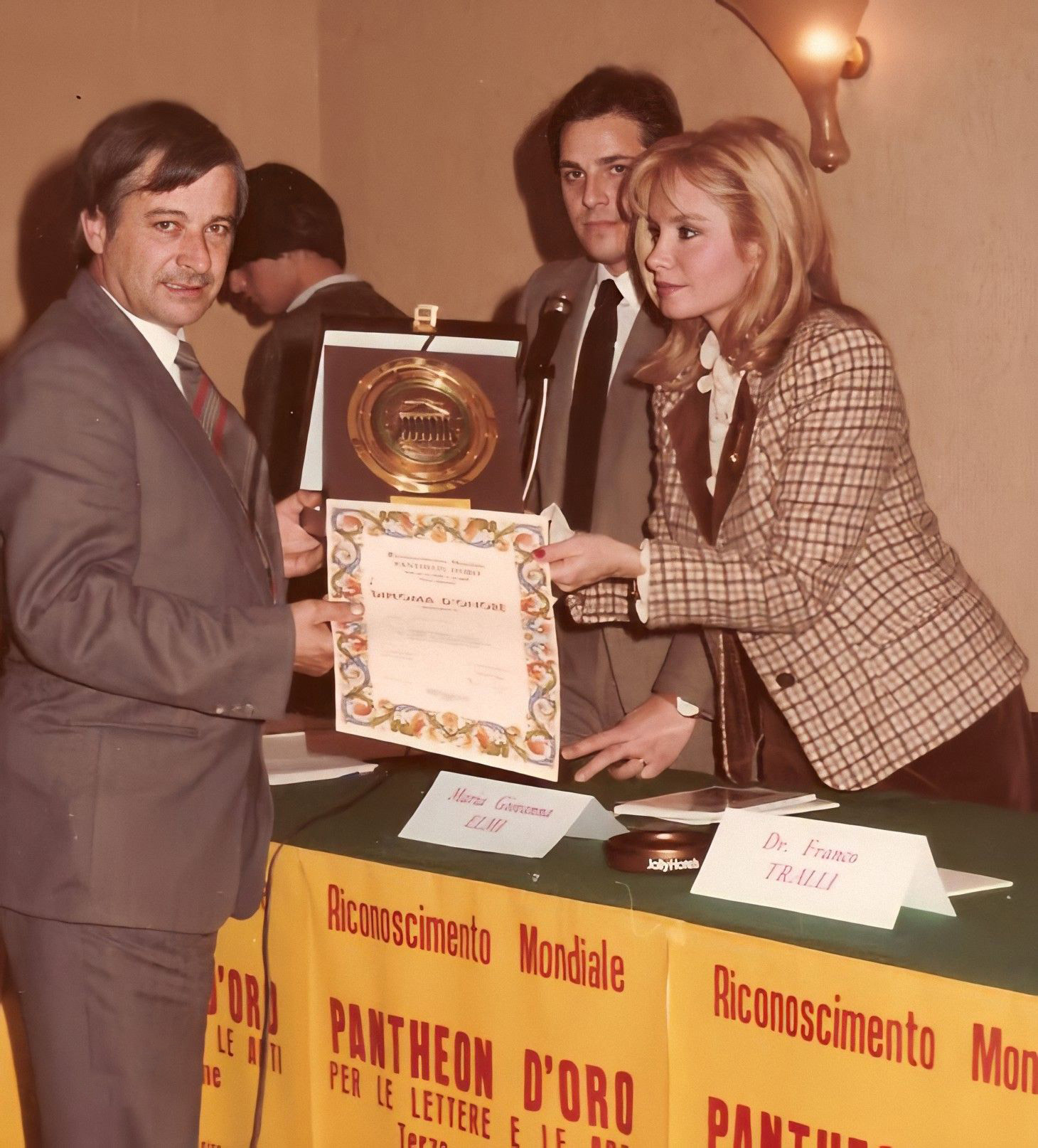
Maria Giovanna Elmi awards Orfeo Reda Pantheon d'oro - Bologna 1983

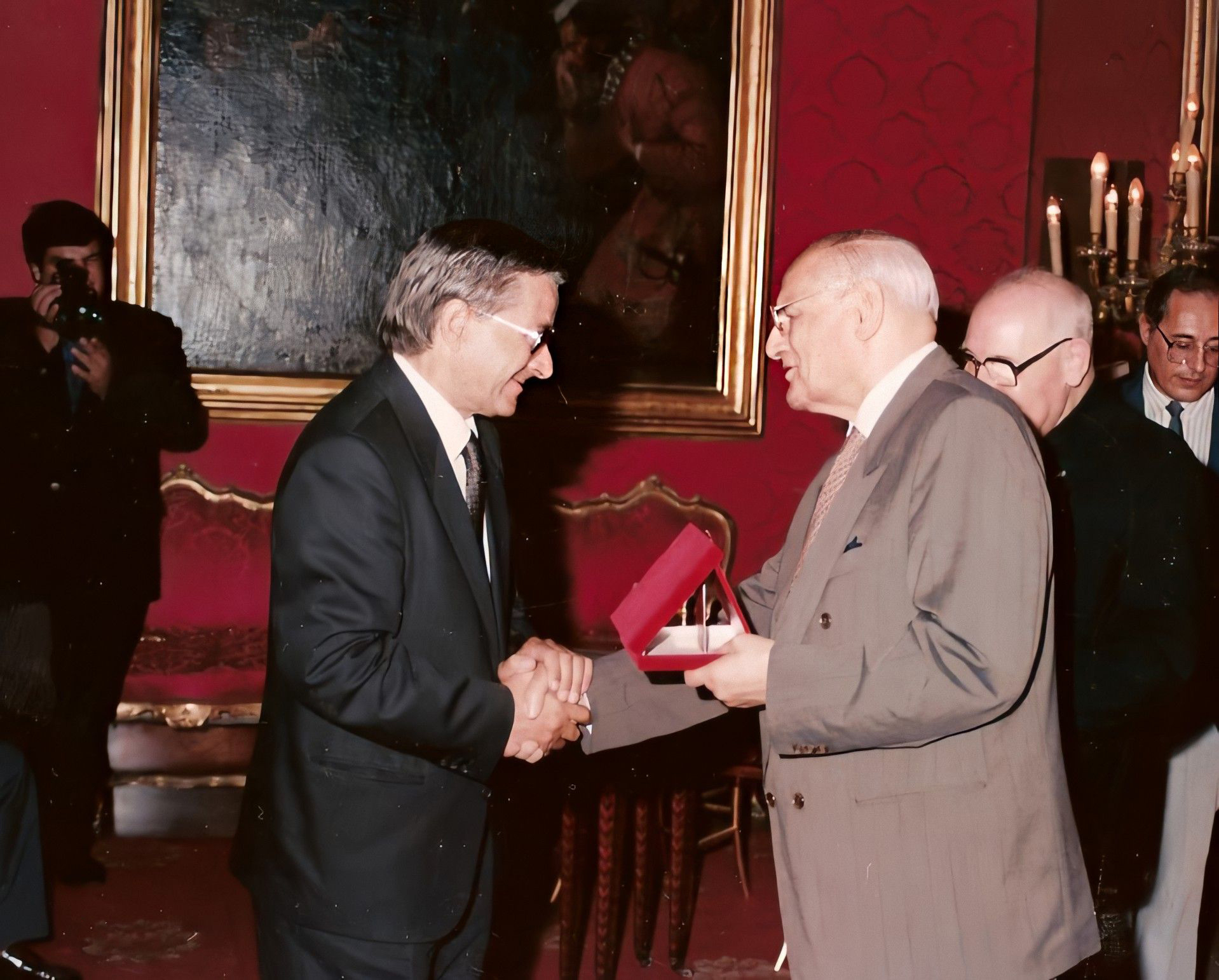
Orfeo Reda awarded by the President of the Republic of Malta Censu Tabone in the Hall of Ambassadors of the Palace of the President of the Republic

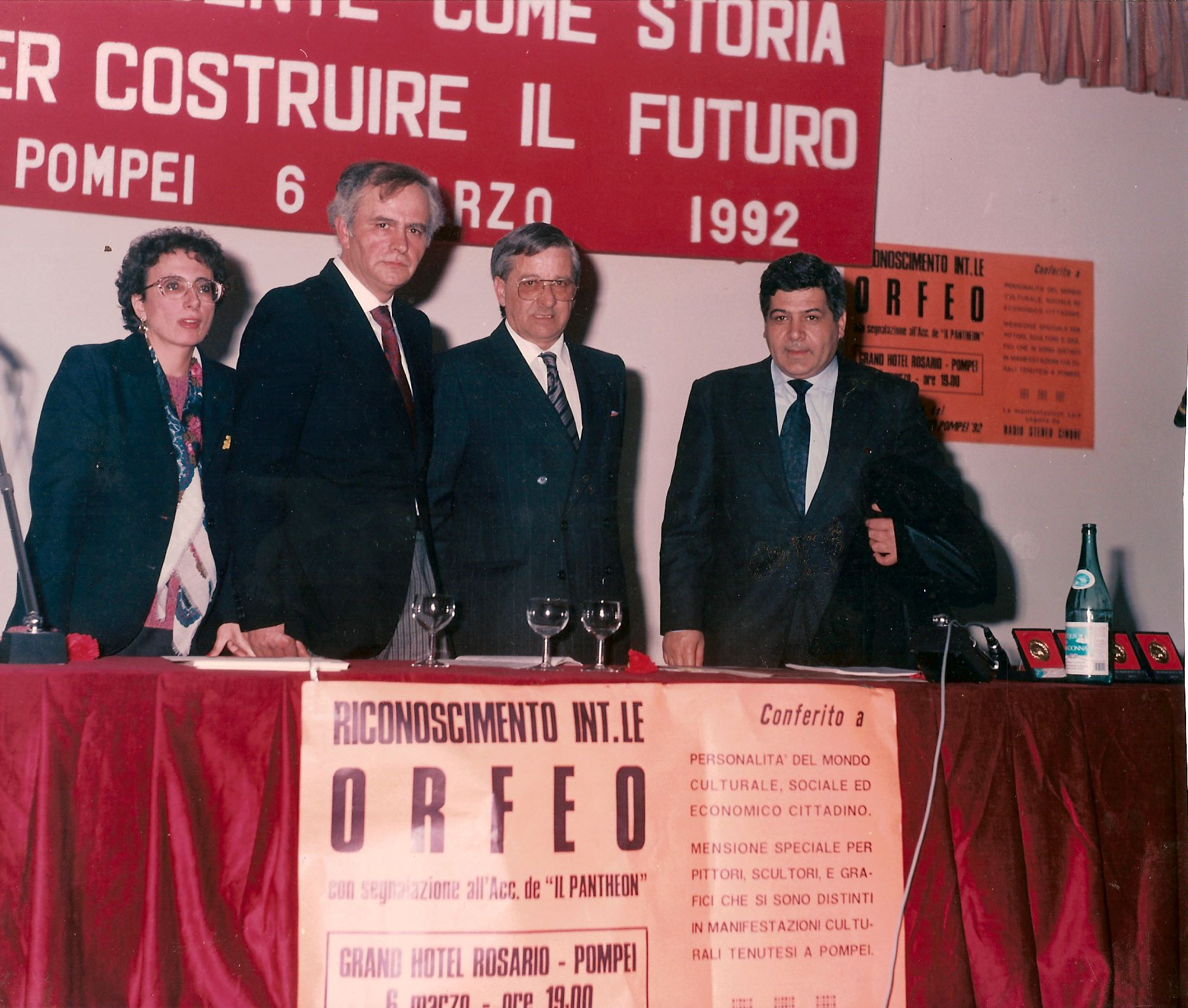
Orfeo Reda; International recognition in his name awarded to personalities from the cultural and social world of Pompeii - 1992

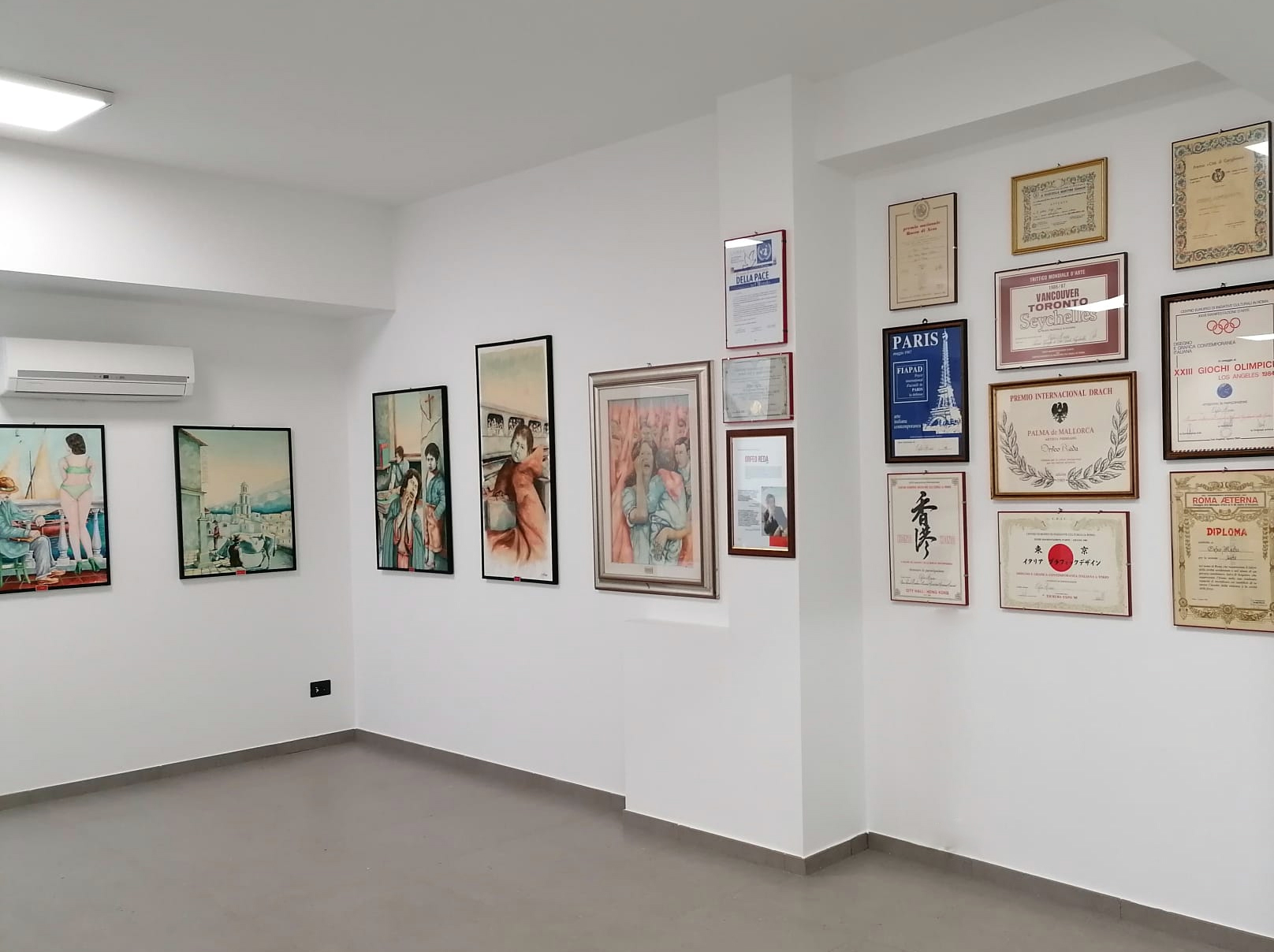
Permanent exhibition of Orfeo Reda in the Carolei Council Chamber - Pro Loco of Carolei

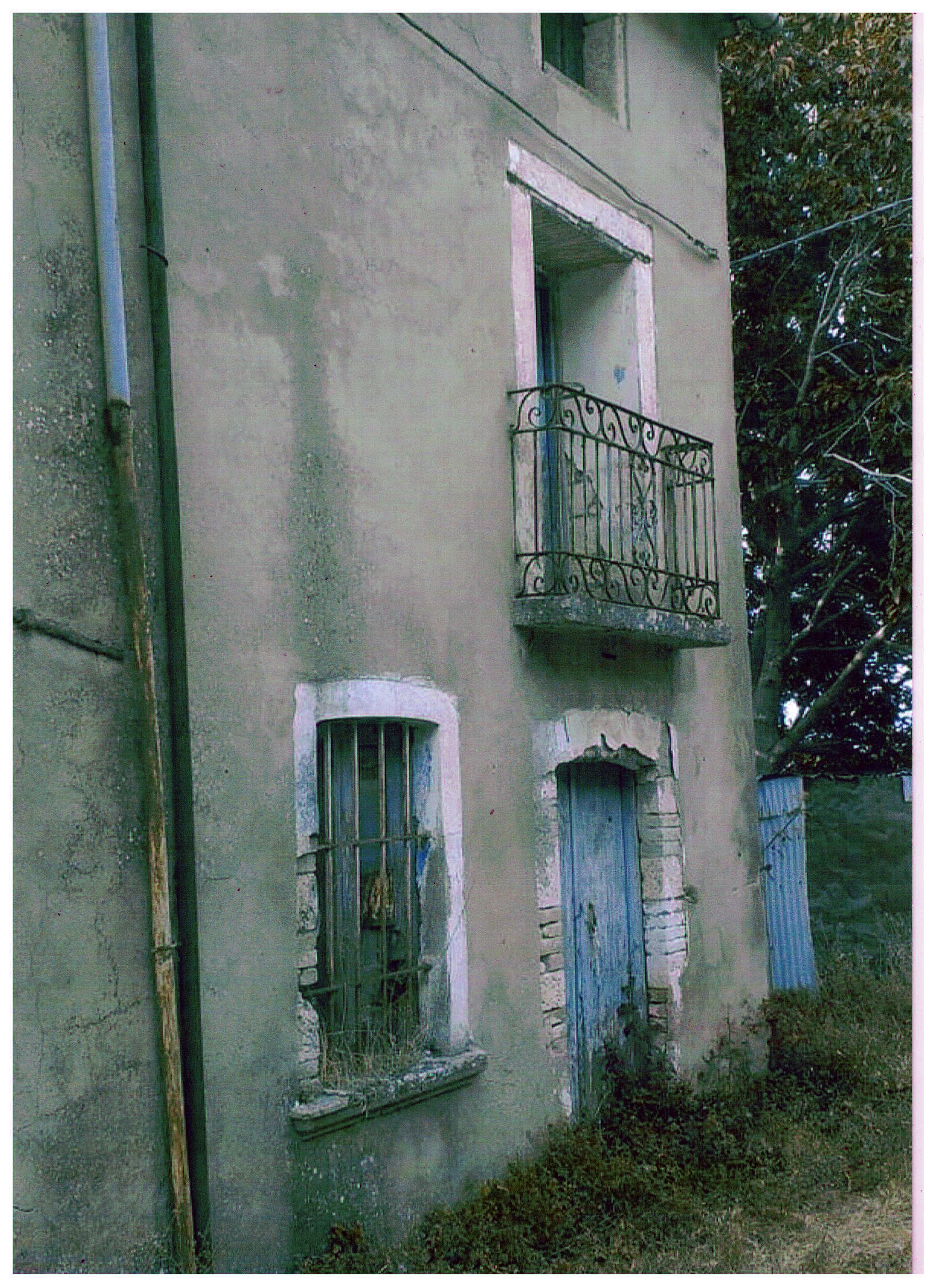
Orfeo Reda's native house in Carolei

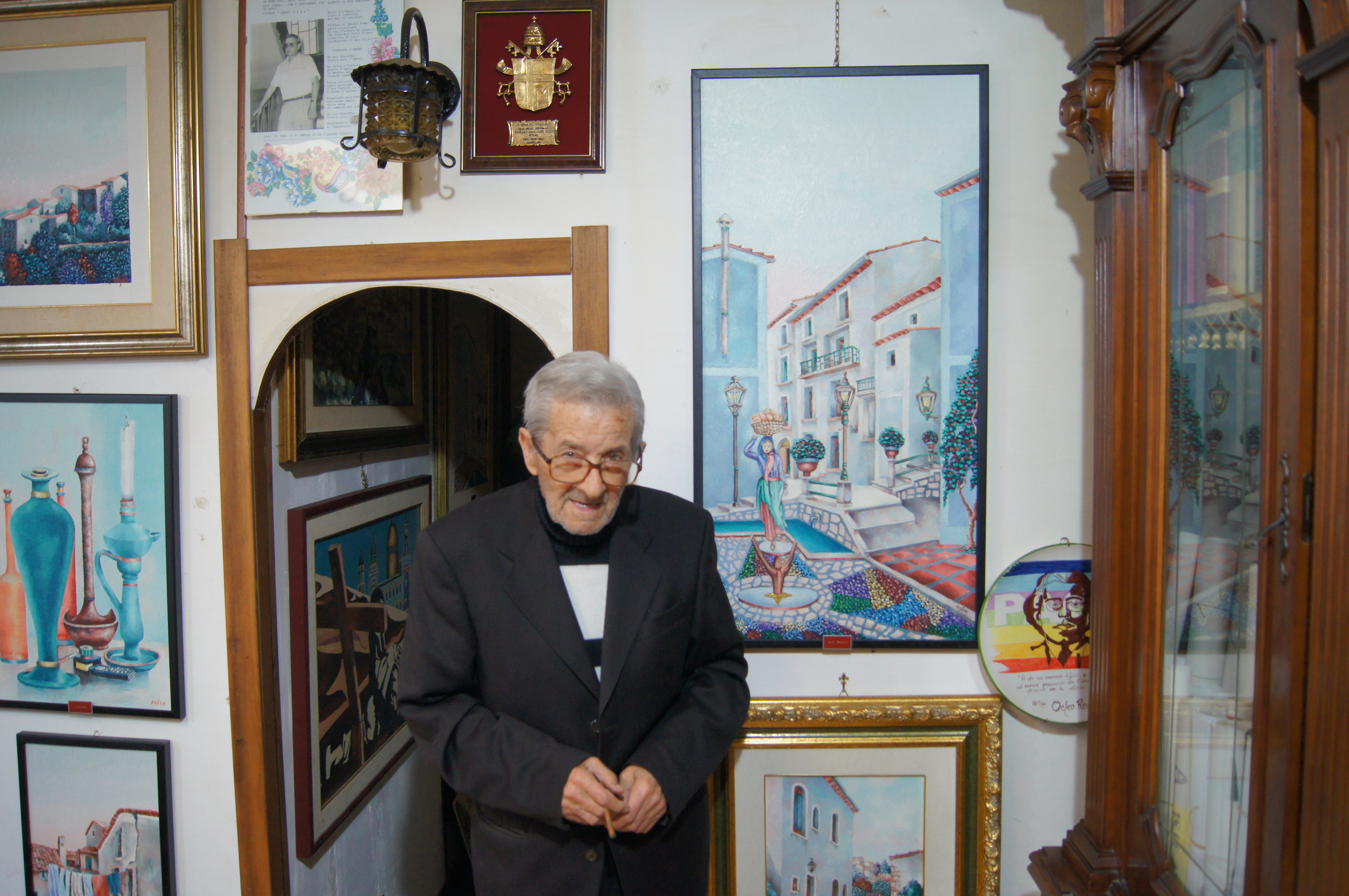
Orfeo Reda in his studio in Amantea in January 2021

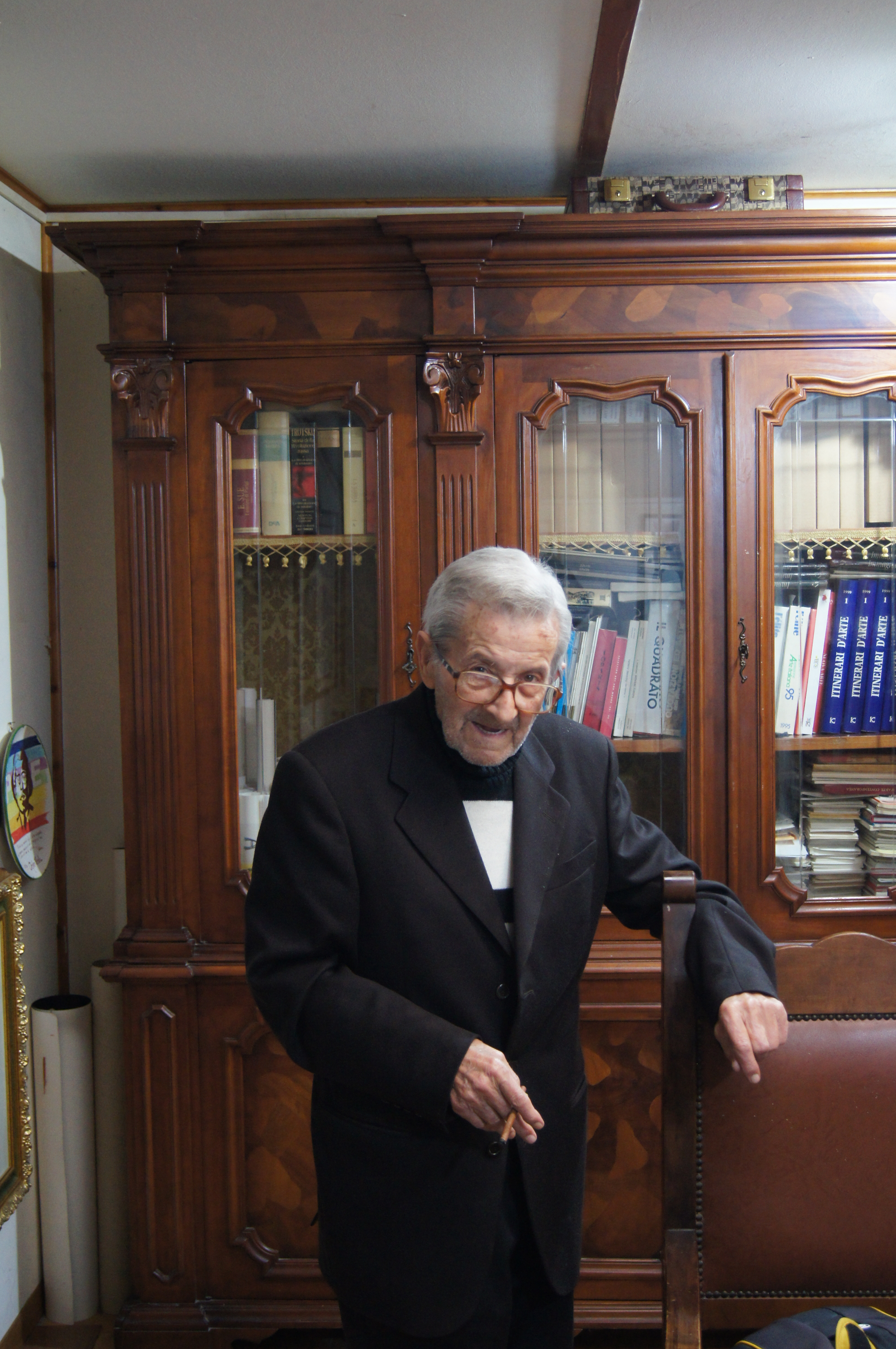
Orfeo Reda in 2021

== Bibliography ==
- I Quaderni dell'arte. 1996. p. 70.
- Pinto, Rosario (2012). Fra tradizione e innovazione (Volume 4). p. 150.
- Zauli, Paolo (2015). Grazie Italia. p. 175.
