= Il Duce Canadese =

Canadian television drama series

Il Duce Canadese (French: Il duce canadese: Le Mussolini canadien) is a Canadian television miniseries, which aired on Télévision de Radio-Canada in French in 2004, and CBC Television in English in 2005.

The series revolves around the Alvaro family, an Italian-Canadian family in Montreal during World War II whose lives are tested when family patriarch Angelo (Tony Nardi) is falsely arrested and imprisoned by the Royal Canadian Mounted Police as a national security threat.

The series' cast also includes Alexis Bélec, Ron Lea, Gerry Mendicino, Dino Tavarone, Marina Orsini, Mark Camacho and Carlo Rota.

It received three Gemini Award nominations at the 21st Gemini Awards in 2006, for Best Performance by an Actor in a Leading Role in a Dramatic Program or Miniseries (Nardi), Best Performance by an Actor in a Featured Supporting Role in a Dramatic Program or Miniseries (Tavarone) and Best Costume Design (Anne Duceppe).
