= Enrica Maria Modugno =

Italian actress

- Born: 5 August 1958 (age 67); Rome, Italy
- Occupation: Actress

Enrica Maria Modugno (born 5 August 1958) is an Italian actress. She is most noted for her roles in Brothers Taviani's "Kaos" (1984), The Mass Is Ended (La messa è finita), for which she received a Ciak d'oro nomination for Best Actress in 1986, and the Canadian film The Saracen Woman (La Sarrasine), for which she received a Genie Award nomination for Best Actress at the 13th Genie Awards in 1992.

Her other film roles have included The Night of the Shooting Stars (1982), Kaos (1984), The Moro Affair (1986), The Story of Boys & Girls (1989) and La scuola (1995).
