= Timothy Webber =

Canadian actor

- Born: St. John's, Newfoundland, Canada
- Education: Dalhousie University

Timothy Webber is a Canadian television, film, and stage actor best known for his performance as Djordje in the film My Father's Angel (1999), for which he was a Best Supporting Actor nominee at the 21st Genie Awards.

== Career ==
Webber's film roles have included Mo in Terror Train (1980), Greg in Ticket to Heaven (1981), Sgt. Fernie in The Grey Fox (1982), Lewis in That's My Baby! (1984), Edison Crowe in Toby McTeague (1985), Danny Boland in John and the Missus (1986), Stone's business associate in The Moderns (1988), Spicy's friend in Leaving Normal (1992), Lyman in North of Pittsburgh (also 1992), My Father's Angel (1999), Alvin Walters in Married Life (2007), and more. For his role in My Father's Angel, Webber earned a Genie Award for Best Actor nomination.

Webber's television roles have included Willie in War Brides, Cece Cooper in Arctic Air, Jerome Robinsky in Men in Trees, Moon in Cedar Cove, Harris Miller in North of 60, Desmond Cage in Cold Squad, Dutch in Black Harbour and The Apprentice in Once Upon a Time. On stage, his noted roles have included Slater in the debut production of Kent Stetson's Warm Wind in China. He was also the voice for the laser pre-show in select IMAX theaters in Canada before certain movies were shown. He is a two-time Gemini Award nominee for Best Supporting Actor in a Drama Series, garnering nominations at the 11th Gemini Awards for North of 60 and at the 14th Gemini Awards for Black Harbour, and was nominated for Best Guest Actor in a Drama Series in 1999 for Cold Squad.

== Personal life ==
A graduate of Dalhousie University, Webber has spent much of his career as an actor living and working in British Columbia.

== Filmography ==
=== Film ===
Year	Title	Role	Notes
1979	The Prize Fighter	Bradshaw	
1980	Hog Wild	Upperclassman II	
1980	Terror Train	Mo	
1981	Ticket to Heaven	Greg	
1982	The Grey Fox	Sergeant Fernie	
1983	The Wars	Corporal Bates	
1984	The Hotel New Hampshire	Wrench	
1984	That's My Baby!	Lewis	
1985	Toby McTeague	Edison Crowe	
1985	One Magic Christmas	Herbie Conklin	
1986	The Wake	Jim Whalen	
1987	Nowhere to Hide	Kevin	
1987	John and the Missus	Danny Boland	
1988	The Moderns	Stone's Business Associate	
1989	Millennium	Audio Technician	
1990	Bethune: The Making of a Hero	Reporter	
1992	Leaving Normal	Spicy's Friend	
1992	North of Pittsburgh	Lyman	
1992	Impolite	Prentice	
1994	Intersection	Truck Driver	
1999	In the Blue Ground	Harris Miller	
1999	My Father's Angel	Djordje	
2001	Ignition	Suit #2	
2002	Cypher	Callaway	
2003	One Last Dance	Jerry	
2005	Missing in America	Mitchell	
2007	Married Life	Alvin Walters	
2011	Afghan Luke	Dr. Hinkley	
2011	Rise of the Planet of the Apes	Stan Timko	Uncredited
2013	A Fish Story	Hank	
2014	Seventh Son	Malcom Ward	
2017	War for the Planet of the Apes	Ape Elder	
2018	Rabbit	Dusty Kelly	
2019	Light of My Life	Lemmy	

=== Television ===
Year	Title	Role	Notes
1980	War Brides	Willie	TV movie
1983	Cook & Peary: The Race to the Pole	Harry Whitney	TV movie
1983	The Accident	Rev. Gowers	TV movie
1985	Murder in Space	Guy Sterling	TV movie
1985	Murder: By Reason of Insanity	Guy Sterling	TV movie
1986	He Shoots, He Scores	Gary Bennett	Supporting cast
1986	The Wonderful Wizard of Oz	Various voices	
1987	Alfred Hitchcock Presents	Alan	Episode: "The Mole"
1987	Ghost of a Chance	Fein	TV movie
1988	The Ann Jillian Story	Charlie Austin	TV movie
1988	God Bless the Child	Dr. Chaney	TV movie
1988, 1989	Friday the 13th: The Series	Bob Tucker / Telephone Lineman	2 episodes
1989	T. and T.	Hickson	Episode: "Hunted"
1989	Day One	Colonel Lansdale	TV movie
1989	Matinee	Geoff	TV movie
1989	Dick Francis: Blood Sport	Matt Clive	TV movie
1989	E.N.G.	Tony	Episode: "Pilot: Part 1"
1989	Magic Hour: Tom Alone	Willie Davis	TV movie
1989	Love and Hate	Jim Street	TV movie
1990	MacGyver	Joe Banneker	Episode: "Deep Cover"
1990	War of the Worlds	Thresher	Episode: "The True Believer"
1990	Wiseguy	Fred McKnight	Episode: "Changing Houses"
1990	Neon Rider	Norman Otis Beales	Episode: "Clay Pigeon"
1991	21 Jump Street	Officer Forbes	Episode: "Equal Protection"
1991	Captive	Harry Jordan	TV movie
1991	Street Justice	Det. Traynor	5 episodes
1991	Max Glick	Teacher	2 episodes
1992	Bill & Ted's Excellent Adventures	Man	Episode: "It's a Totally Wonderful Life"
1992	Screen One	Jack Lamb	Episode: "Disaster at Valdez"
1992	Dead Ahead: The Exxon Valdez Disaster	Jack Lamb	TV movie
1992	The Boys of St. Vincent	Brian Lunney age 30	TV movie
1992–1997	North of 60	Harris Miller	Recurring role
1994	Green Dolphin Beat	Artie Minz	TV movie
1994–1996	The X-Files	Various roles	3 episodes
1995	Forever Knight	News Anchor #2	Episode: "A More Permanent Hell"
1996	Justice on Wheels	Joe	TV movie
1996	To Brave Alaska	Bar Patron	TV movie
1996–2001	The Outer Limits	Various roles	3 episodes
1997	Poltergeist: The Legacy	Sheriff	Episode: "Black Widow"
1997, 1998	Millennium	Waylan Bryce / Sheriff Camden	2 episodes
1997–1999	Black Harbour	Brother Dutch	Recurring role
1998–2002	Cold Squad	Desmond Cage / Eric Marshall	6 episodes
1999	Dead Man's Gun	Cole	Episode: "Bad Boys"
1999	Life in a Day	Chief Max Reed	TV movie
1999	Da Vinci's Inquest	Louis Diggens	Episode: "His Wife"
1999	Hope Island	Roy Franklin	Episode: "Ships That Pass in the Night"
2000	Trial by Fire	Harris Miller	TV movie
2000	Honey, I Shrunk the Kids: The TV Show	Mr. Gorvak	Episode: "Honey, Situation Normal, All Szalinski'd Up"
2000	Deadlocked	Marvin Levin	TV movie
2000	Mysterious Ways	Angus Sharp	Episode: "Spirit Junction"
2000	So Weird	Ziegler	Episode: "Exit 13"
2000	The Immortal	McQueen	Episode: "Half Way"
2000	Call of the Wild	Mallory / Malloy	Recurring role
2001	Anatomy of a Hate Crime	Officer Slade	TV movie
2001	The Lone Gunmen	Jason Guthrie	Episode: "Like Water for Octane"
2001	Dream Storm	Harris	TV movie
2001	UC: Undercover	Henderson	Episode: "The Siege"
2002	Andromeda	Archduke	Episode: "The Prince"
2002	Taken	Dewey Clayton	2 episodes
2002–2004	Tom Stone	Grant Davidson	Main cast
2003	Another Country	Harris Miller	TV movie
2004	Stargate SG-1	Commander Gareth	Episode: "Icon"
2005	Distant Drumming: A North of 60 Mystery	Harris Miller	TV movie
2005	Saving Milly	Neurologist	TV movie
2005	Supernatural	Ranger Wilkinson	Episode: "Wendigo"
2005	Dark Pines	Judge Little	TV movie
2006	The Collector	Henry Tollin	Episode: "The Farmer"
2006	The Evidence	Dr. Layland	Episode: "Pilot"
2006	Past Sins	Leo Rudd	TV movie
2006–2008	Men in Trees	Jerome Robinsky	Recurring role
2009	The Guard	Mike Weber	Episode: "Body Parts"
2009	Reaper	Priest	Episode: "The Devil and Sam Oliver"
2009	Virtuality	Union Sergeant	TV movie
2009	Stargate Universe	Priest	Episode: "Air: Part 3"
2009	Alice	Carpenter	2 episodes
2010	Always a Bridesmaid	Larry	Episode: "So Hippie Together"
2011	Bringing Ashley Home	Chuck McGee	TV movie
2011	Heartland	Reid Tatum	2 episodes
2012	Fringe	Man in Warehouse	2 episodes
2012–2014	Arctic Air	Cece Cooper	Main cast
2013–2015	Cedar Cove	Moon	Main cast
2014–2017	Once Upon a Time	The Apprentice	10 episodes
2015	Falling Skies	Willie McComb	Episode: "Respite"
2016	Unser Traum von Kanada	Hank	Episode: "Sowas wie Familie"
2016	Aftermath	Ewan	Episode: "The Barbarous King"
2017	Moonlight in Vermont	Chauncey	TV movie
2017	Somewhere Between	Simon	Episode: "Madness"
2017	The Exorcist	Russ / Ted Holmstrom	4 episodes
2017–2020	Loudermilk	Ed	Supporting cast
2017–2019	A Series of Unfortunate Events	Jimmy	3 episodes
2019	See	Cutter	3 episodes
2019, 2020	Riverdale	Forsythe Pendleton Jones I	2 episodes
2021	Schmigadoon!	Marv	Episode: "Schmigadoon!"
2022	Legends of Tomorrow	The Proprietor	2 episodes
