= Mr. Aiello =

- French: La Déroute
- Directed by: Paul Tana
- Written by: Tony Nardi; Paul Tana; Bruno Ramirez
- Produced by: Marc Daigle; Bernadette Payeur
- Starring: Tony Nardi; Michèle-Barbara Pelletier
- Cinematography: Michel Caron
- Edited by: Yves Chaput
- Music by: Pierre Desrochers
- Production company: ACPAV
- Distributed by: Lions Gate Films
- Release date: February 19, 1998 (RVQC)
- Running time: 110 minutes
- Country: Canada
- Language: French

Mr. Aiello (French: La Déroute) is a Canadian drama film, directed by Paul Tana and released in 1998. The film stars Tony Nardi as Joe Aiello, a successful Italian Canadian businessman in Montreal whose life begins to unravel when his daughter (Michèle-Barbara Pelletier), whom he has long expected to take over the company, announces her plan to drop out of business school to become a photographer.

Nardi received a Genie Award nomination for Best Actor at the 19th Genie Awards. She won the 1997 Prix Guy-L'Écuyer for her performance in Mr. Aiello.
