= My Father's Angel =

- Directed by: Davor Marjanovic
- Written by: Frank Borg
- Produced by: David Bouck; Mort Ransen
- Starring: Tony Nardi; Timothy Webber; Tygh Runyan; Brendan Fletcher
- Cinematography: Bruce Worrall
- Edited by: Lenka Svab
- Music by: Schaun Tozer
- Production company: Ranfilm Productions
- Release date: September 11, 1999 (TIFF)
- Running time: 86 minutes
- Country: Canada
- Language: English

My Father's Angel is a Canadian drama film, released in 1999.

Directed by Davor Marjanovic, the film stars Tony Nardi as Ahmed and Timothy Webber as Djordje, refugees of the Bosnian War who have settled in Vancouver, only to be drawn into the same ethnic conflict with each other that they had sought to leave behind. After they get into a car accident, Djordje tries to befriend Ahmed out of a desire to right the wrongs of their home country, but finds his overtures of friendship rejected when Ahmed is reluctant to accept that Djordje is being sincere.

The film premiered at the 1999 Toronto International Film Festival.

The film garnered three Genie Award nominations at the 21st Genie Awards in 2001, with Best Actor nods for both Nardi and Webber and a Best Screenplay nomination for writer Frank Borg. Nardi won the award for Best Actor. The film also won six Leo Awards for films produced in British Columbia, for Best Picture, Best Director, Best Screenplay, Best Cinematography (Bruce Worrall), Best Musical Score (Schaun Tozer) and Best Female Performance (Asja Pavlovic).
