= Concrete Angels =

- Directed by: Carlo Liconti
- Written by: Jim Purdy
- Produced by: Anthony Kramreither; Carlo Liconti
- Starring: Joseph Di Mambro; Omie Craden; Luke McKeehan; Tony Nardi
- Cinematography: Karol Ike
- Edited by: John Harding
- Music by: Robert Miller
- Production company: Brightstar Films
- Distributed by: Cineplex Odeon
- Release date: 1987
- Running time: 97 minutes
- Country: Canada
- Language: English

Concrete Angels is a Canadian musical drama film, directed by Carlo Liconti and released in 1987. Set in 1964, the film centres on a group of teenagers in a working class ethnic neighbourhood in Toronto, Ontario. After a radio station announces a battle of the bands competition whose prize will be the opportunity to open for The Beatles at Maple Leaf Gardens, the boys form a band with the hopes of winning the competition.

The film stars Joseph Di Mambro as Bello, the band's leader and singer; Omie Craden as Ira, the drummer; Luke McKeehan as Sean, the guitarist; and Tony Nardi as Sal, Bello's uncle who owns the neighbourhood pool hall. This was the final film of actor Gary Grimes, before retiring and going into a career of helping refugees who emigrated legally in America.

Nardi received a Genie Award nomination for Best Supporting Actor at the 9th Genie Awards.
