= From the Vine =

2019 Canadian drama film

- Film poster
- Directed by: Sean Cisterna
- Written by: Willem Wennekers
- Based on: Finding Marco by Kenneth Canio Cancellara
- Produced by: Kyle Bornais; Paula Brancati; Sean Cisterna; Francesco Papa
- Starring: Joe Pantoliano; Wendy Crewson; Paula Brancati
- Cinematography: Scott McClellan
- Edited by: Andrew Wall
- Production companies: Farpoint Films; Mythic Productions
- Distributed by: Indiecan Entertainment
- Release date: June 2019 (ICFF)
- Running time: 97 minutes
- Country: Canada
- Languages: English; Italian

From the Vine is a 2019 Canadian drama film, directed by Sean Cisterna. Based on the novel Finding Marco by Kenneth Canio Cancellara, the film stars Joe Pantoliano as Marco Gentile, a burned-out business executive from Toronto who gives up on the corporate rat race, and moves his family to Italy to revive his grandfather's vineyard in Acerenza. The film also stars Wendy Crewson as Marco's wife Marina and Paula Brancati as their daughter Laura, as well as Marco Leonardi, Tony Nardi, Tony Nappo, Kevin Hanchard and Frank Moore in supporting roles.

== Plot ==
Marco Gentile (Joe Pantoliano), a successful automotive executive in Toronto, experiences a profound ethical crisis when his environmentally conscious initiatives are dismissed by his company. Disillusioned by corporate greed, he resigns from his high-paying job and relocates to his ancestral hometown of Acerenza in southern Italy.

In Acerenza, Marco discovers that his late grandfather's vineyard has been abandoned and is now overgrown. Determined to revive it, he purchases the property back from the local government, who had seized it due to unpaid taxes. With no prior winemaking experience, Marco enlists the help of the local community, including his childhood friend Luca (Marco Leonardi), to restore the vineyard.

As Marco immerses himself in the winemaking process, he finds a renewed sense of purpose and connection to his heritage. His wife, Marina (Wendy Crewson), and daughter, Laura (Paula Brancati), initially skeptical of his decision, visit him in Italy. They are gradually drawn into the charm of the village and the winemaking endeavor, rekindling their familial bonds.

The film explores themes of personal redemption, the importance of community, and the value of returning to one's roots. Through Marco's journey, From the Vine portrays the transformative power of embracing simplicity and tradition in a modern world dominated by consumerism.

== Cast ==
- Joe Pantoliano as Marco Gentile
  - Michele Stefanile as Young Marco Gentile
- Wendy Crewson as Marina Gentile
- Paula Brancati as Laura Gentile
- Marco Leonardi as Luca
- Tony Nardi as Marcello
- Tony Nappo as Enzo
- Franco Lo Presti as Gio
- Kevin Hanchard as John
- Rita del Piano as Amelia
- Sonia Dhillon Tully as Barbara Cavendish
- Frank Moore as Gordon Welsh
- Blu Lepore as Customs Agent
- Kenneth Canio Cancellara as Train Conductor

== Release ==
The film premiered in June 2019 at the Italian Contemporary Film Festival in Toronto, and subsequently received other film festival screenings through the summer, although its October screening at Devour! The Food Film Fest was billed as its official North American premiere. The film was originally scheduled to enter commercial release on May 1, 2020, although this was cancelled due to the impact of the COVID-19 pandemic in Canada. It was instead released on digital platforms in July 2020.

== Reception ==
From the Vine was generally received positively by critics. On the review aggregator website Rotten Tomatoes, 75% of 24 critics' reviews are positive, with an average rating of 6.0/10. The website's consensus reads: "A too-rare opportunity for Joe Pantoliano to shine in a leading role, From the Vine transcends its formulaic story with infectious warmth." David Stratton, in The Australian, wrote that "Sean Cistera's film is, in its modest way, attractive enough. It doesn't aim very high, but its celebration of old traditions in a world where environmental concerns are being set aside in the name of progress is certainly welcome." Conversely, Cath Clarke of The Guardian gave the film a negative review, describing it as "Eat Pray Love for wealthy male boomers: embarrassingly sincere and iffily patronising to its Italian characters."
