= The Story of Boys & Girls =

- Directed by: Pupi Avati
- Cinematography: Pasquale Rachini
- Music by: Riz Ortolani
- Release date: 1989

The Story of Boys & Girls (Italian: Storia di ragazzi e di ragazze) is a 1989 Italian comedy-drama film directed by Pupi Avati. The film won the Silver Ribbons for best director and for best script and the David di Donatello for best screenplay.

== Cast ==
- Felice Andreasi: Domenico
- Lucrezia Lante della Rovere: Silvia
- Alessandro Haber: Giulio, Silvia's father
- Angiola Baggi: Maria
- Davide Bechini: Angelo
- Claudio Botosso: Taddeo
- Enrica Maria Modugno: Linda
- Anna Bonaiuto: Amelia, Angelo's mother
- Massimo Bonetti: Baldo
- Valeria Bruni Tedeschi: Valeria
- Stefania Orsola Garello: Antonia, Angelo's sister
- Marcello Cesena: Lele

== Reception ==
On review aggregator website Rotten Tomatoes, the film holds an approval rating of 100% based on 5 reviews, with an average rating of 7.7/10.
