= Caffè Italia, Montréal =

- Directed by: Paul Tana
- Written by: Paul Tana; Bruno Ramirez
- Produced by: Marc Daigle
- Starring: Pierre Curzi; Tony Nardi
- Cinematography: Michel Caron
- Edited by: Louise Surprenant
- Music by: Pierre Flynn; Enzo Grande; Andrea Piazza
- Production company: ACPAV
- Release date: September 19, 1985
- Running time: 81 minutes
- Country: Canada
- Languages: French; Italian

Caffè Italia, Montréal is a Canadian docudrama film, directed by Paul Tana and released in 1985. Focusing on the Italian Canadian community in Montreal, Quebec, the film profiles the community's history through a mix of archival footage and historical reenactments of key events acted by a cast led by Pierre Curzi and Tony Nardi.

The film won the Prix L.-E.-Ouimet-Molson from the Association québécoise des critiques de cinéma for 1985.
