= Alfonso Rendano =

Italian pianist and composer

Alfonso Rendano (5 April 1853 – 10 September 1931) was an Italian pianist and composer.

Rendano was born in Carolei (Cosenza). He was particularly precocious and at the age of ten he was admitted to the Naples Conservatory, where he was noticed by Sigismund Thalberg who sent him to Paris, recommending him to Rossini.

In 1866 he studied under Georges Mathias, Chopin's pupil. For about 15 years, he carried out an intense musical activity; he then devoted himself to teaching, first in Naples, then in Rome.

Rendano also enjoyed the support of Franz Liszt who tried to help ensure that Rendano's Piano Concerto would receive a performance in a coming German music festival. Liszt wrote of the work: "It is a vigorous, original and remarkable work which I greatly appreciate."

Rendano wrote the opera Consuelo, successfully staged in Turin and in Germany. He held his last concert at Rome's Teatro Valle in 1925. He died in Rome in 1931.

The main theatre of Cosenza is named after him.
