= Paul Tana =

Italian-Canadian film director and screenwriter

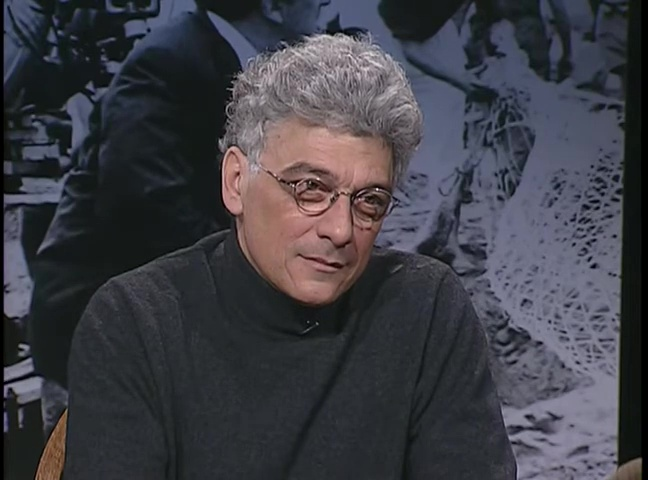
Tana on CUNY TV's City Cinematheque, 2000

Paul Tana (born in Ancona, January 8, 1947) is an Italian-Canadian film director and screenwriter. He is most noted for his 1992 film The Saracen Woman (La Sarrasine), which received ten Genie Award nominations at the 13th Genie Awards in 1992 including a nomination for Tana in the Best Original Screenplay category.

Born in Ancona, Marche, Italy, Tana emigrated to Canada with his family in childhood. He studied literature at the Université du Québec à Montréal before joining the Association Coopérative des Productions Audio-Visuelles, for whom he made a number of short films before releasing his debut feature film, Day by Day (Les grands enfants), in 1980.

His 1985 documentary film Caffè Italia, Montréal won the Prix L.-E.-Ouimet-Molson from the Association québécoise des critiques de cinéma. He followed up with the narrative feature films La Sarrasine in 1992, and Mr. Aiello (La Déroute) in 1998. This trilogy was made possible thanks to the close collaboration and friendship with historian and screenwriter Bruno Ramirez. with whom he wrote the three films just mentioned.

Since Mr. Aiello, Tana has concentrated primarily on documentary films, most notably the Ricordato di noi project to recover lost footage of Montreal's Italian community newsmagazine television series Teledomenica.

"Ricordati di noi" (souviens toi de nous, edited by the director, who is also a friend and pupil Giovanni Princigalli) is part of a trilogy of short documentaries, also on Italian emigration, consisting of: Souviens-toi de nous in 2008, Marguerita in 2015 and Le figuier in 2018.

In addition to Giovanni Princigalli, he formed a partnership with Roberto Zorfini, another Italian director who had moved to Montreal, producing in 2019 two works with them together with the Italian Cultural Institute in Montreal.

His latest documentary Fellini premières fois tells the story of how Federico Fellini was seen and discovered by Quebec filmmakers and film professionals.

== Filmography ==
- Day by Day (Les grands enfants) - 1980
- Caffè Italia, Montréal - 1985
- Marchand de jouets - 1988
- The Saracen Woman (La Sarrasine) - 1992
- Mr. Aiello (La Déroute) - 1998
- Parole d’artistes - 2003
- Souviens-toi de nous - 2008
- Marguerita - 2015
- Le figuier - 2018
- Fellini premières fois - 2020
