= Carolei =

- Comune
- Comune di Carolei
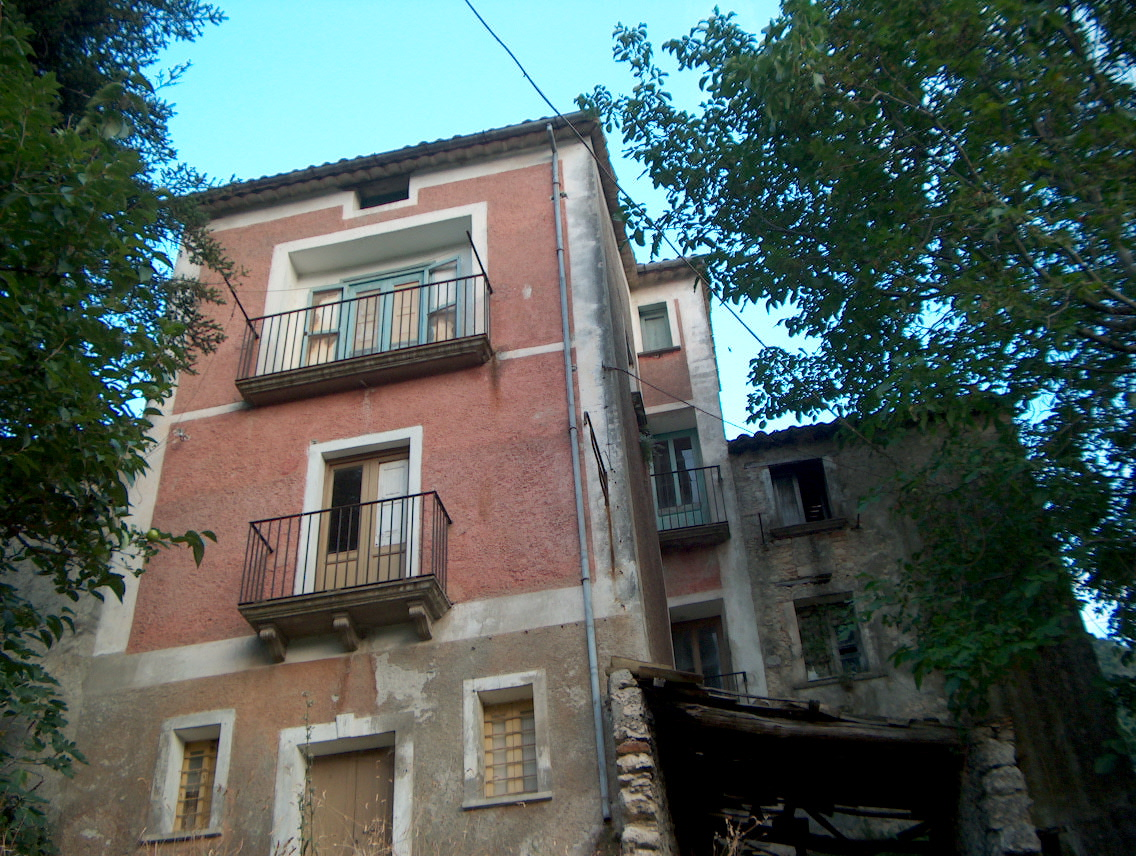

- Location within Italy Location within Calabria
- Coordinates: 39°15′N 16°13′E
- Country: Italy
- Region: Calabria
- Province: Cosenza (CS)
- Frazioni: Cardili, Casino Cioppo, Deposito, Lacconi, Monache, Pantanolungo, Treti, Vadue

Government
  - Mayor: Francesco Iannucci

Area
  - Total: 15.43 km^{2} (5.96 sq mi)
- Elevation: 624 m (2,047 ft)

Population (30 April 2017)
  - Total: 3,359
  - Density: 217.7/km^{2} (563.8/sq mi)
- Demonym: Caroleani
- Time zone: UTC+1 (CET)
  - Summer (DST): UTC+2 (CEST)
- Postal code: 87030
- Dialing code: 0984
- ISTAT code: 078026
- Patron saint: Madonna del Carmine
- Saint day: 16 July
- Website: Official website

Carolei is a town and comune in the province of Cosenza in the Calabria region of southern Italy.

== Sites ==
- Monumento San Francesco di Paola (Monument to Saint Francis of Paola)
- Chiesa di San Pietro al Carmine (Church of St. Peter at Carmine)
- Chiesa dell'Immacolata Concezione (Church of the Immaculate Conception)
- Other sites

== Sport ==
The town's main team is "Asd Sporting Carolei" which has been playing in the Second Category championship since 2016.

There are also two five-a-side football teams, Eremiti Carolei and San Luca Vadue, which play in the CSI Serie A championship.

== People from Carolei ==
- Orfeo Reda, (1932) painter
- Alfonso Rendano (1853 - 1931) pianist
