= My Boyfriend's Meds =

2020 Mexican comedy film

- Film poster
- Spanish: Las Pildoras de Mi Novio
- Directed by: Diego Kaplan
- Written by: Gary Marks; E. Braddock
- Produced by: Ben Silverman; Jay Weisleder
- Starring: Jaime Camil; Sandra Echeverría
- Cinematography: Emiliano Villanueva
- Edited by: Vanesa Ferrario
- Music by: Iván Wyszogrod
- Production companies: Fuego Films; Traziende Films
- Distributed by: Pantelion Films
- Release date: 14 February 2020
- Running time: 100 minutes
- Country: Mexico
- Language: Spanish

My Boyfriend's Meds (Spanish: Las Píldoras de Mi Novio) is a 2020 Mexican comedy film directed by Diego Kaplan and starring Jaime Camil and Sandra Echeverría.

== Cast ==
- Jaime Camil as Hank
- Sandra Echeverría as Jess
- Marco Antonio Aguirre as El Mero
- Jason Alexander as Dr. Sternbach
- Luis Arrieta as Gerardo
- Brian Baumgartner as Chase
- James Maslow as Tom
- Mónica Huarte as Susana
- Brooke Shields as Alicia
- Pia Watson as Mali
