= Carlo Liconti =

Italian-Canadian filmmaker

Carlo Liconti is an Italian-Canadian film director, producer, and screenwriter. Born in Veroli, Italy, August 15, 1949, he immigrated to Toronto, Ontario, Canada via the United States in 1955.

Liconti began his filmmaking career in 1975 after attending York University and Ryerson Polytechnical Institute. He started in commercial production, setting up his own studio: Leader Media, which became one of Canada's leading commercial houses producing well over 200 commercial spots. He produced and directed his first feature film Concrete Angels in 1985. His other credits include, among others the feature film Brown Bread Sandwiches starring Giancarlo Giannini and Kim Cattrall, which he also wrote and directed, as well as Vita Cane and Foreign Bodies. He directed The Campbells and My Secret Identity, and produced/directed documentaries including Dragons of Crime for A&E and CBC. He also produced the movie-of-the-week Greener Fields, the first Canadian-Italian co-production under the new treaty.

In mid-2000s Liconti was responsible for setting up an independent TV network based out of Toronto.

Liconti has produced a feature film and television series in Cuba with his company Leader Media, the first production company to have an official treaty co-production with the country.
