= The Saracen Woman =

- French: La Sarrasine
- Directed by: Paul Tana
- Written by: Paul Tana; Bruno Ramirez
- Produced by: Marc Daigle
- Starring: Tony Nardi; Enrica Maria Modugno; Gilbert Sicotte; Tano Cimarosa
- Cinematography: Michel Caron
- Edited by: Louise Surprenant
- Music by: Pierre Desrochers
- Production company: ACPAV
- Release date: February 15, 1992
- Running time: 109 minutes
- Country: Canada
- Languages: French; Italian

The Saracen Woman (French: La Sarrasine) is a Canadian drama film, released in 1992. Directed by Paul Tana and written by Tana and Bruno Ramirez, the film stars Tony Nardi and Enrica Maria Modugno as Giuseppe and Ninetta Moschella, Italian immigrants in Montreal, Quebec. One day, Giuseppe breaks up a fight between a Sicilian tenant of the Moschellas' boarding house and Theo (Gilbert Sicotte), a French Canadian labourer who is also the son-in-law of Giuseppe's friend Alphonse Lamoureux (Jean Lapointe), and is put on trial for murder after his intervention results in Theo's accidental death.

The film's cast also includes Tano Cimarosa, Paul Savoie and Johanne-Marie Tremblay.

Nardi won the Genie Award for Best Actor at the 13th Genie Awards in 1992. The film also garnered nominations for Best Picture, Best Actress (Modugno), Best Supporting Actor (Cimarosa), Best Supporting Actress (Tremblay), Best Original Screenplay (Tana and Ramirez), Best Cinematography (Michel Caron), Best Art Direction (François Séguin), Best Costume Design (François Barbeau) and Best Musical Score (Pierre Desrochers).
