= Lucy Waverman =

Lucy Waverman is a Toronto-based food journalist, editor, columnist, food consultant and cookbook author. She has been a food columnist at the Globe and Mail, Canada's national newspaper for 26 years, and she is the former Food Editor of Food & Drink, a magazine published by the Liquor Control Board of Ontario. She has done extensive recipe and product development for major companies, restaurants and public relations firms. She has also appeared on television and radio shows across Canada and the United States, including 12 years with Citytv's CityLine.

== Career ==
Waverman is the author of eight cookbooks, including the award-winning Home for Dinner, and is the recipient of Cuisine Canada's 2005 Gold Medal Award for Cookbooks for A Matter of Taste, which she co-wrote with friend and wine writer James Chatto. A Matter of Taste was also a finalist for the prestigious James Beard Entertaining Award. Her cookbook Lucy's Kitchen won the Silver Medal at Cuisine Canada's 2007 Canadian Culinary Book Awards. Her most recent cookbook, The Flavour Principle, won the Taste Canada Gold Medal for Best Cookbook and the 2014 Gourmand Award for Best Food and Drinks Book. The Flavour Principle was named one of the Ten Best Cookbooks of Spring by United States-based Publishers Weekly.

In 2005, Waverman was presented with the Gold Award in Food Media/Journalism by the Ontario Hostelry Association for her efforts in mentoring young talent and for educating the public about cooking and world cuisines through her writing and teaching. She was honoured with The Women's Culinary Network's 2013 Woman of the Year award and was selected to represent Canada in a cultural exchange with Korea. She also represented Canada at the S. Pellegrino Cooking Cup in Venice, Italy in 2013. In 2014, she taught as the Joseph Hoare Gastronomic Writer in Residence at the Stratford Chefs School

Waverman trained at Le Cordon Bleu, has an Ontario Teachers' Certificate and a degree in journalism. From 1972 to 1990, she owned and directed The Cooking School, a Toronto school devoted to the teaching of good cooking.

Waverman believes strongly in volunteerism and was on the board of the International Association of Culinary Professionals and chaired their Julia Child Cookbook Awards. She has also served on the board of Second Harvest and of the Necessary Angel Theatre Company. Her work is seen in many charity cookbooks including the original Impossible Pie for Sick Kids Hospital, which she edited.
