= Sean Cisterna =

Canadian film director and producer

Sean Cisterna is a Canadian film director and producer from Orillia, Ontario, most noted for his 2019 film From the Vine.

Cisterna directed a number of direct-to-video comedy and horror films before making the YTV television film King of the Camp, in 2008. He followed up with the feature film Moon Point in 2011, the documentary 30 Ghosts in 2013, and the feature films Full Out (2015) and Kiss and Cry (2017).

In 2022, he premiered the documentary film The Long Rider.

His film Boy City entered production in 2021, and premiered at the 2022 Whistler Film Festival.

In 2023, he entered production on Long Ride Home, a narrative fiction film based on the same true story he had documented in The Long Rider.

In 2025, he released the documentary film Silver Screamers.
