= List of Canadian films of 1984 =

This is a list of Canadian films which were released in 1984:

Title	Director	Cast	Genre	Notes
The Bay Boy	Daniel Petrie	Kiefer Sutherland, Liv Ullmann, Peter Donat, Alan Scarfe, Chris Wiggins, Leah Pinsent	Coming-of-age drama	Canada-France co-production
Bedroom Eyes	William Fruet	Dayle Haddon, Christine Cattell	Thriller	
Best Revenge	John Trent		Drama	
The Blood of Others	Claude Chabrol	Jodie Foster, Michael Ontkean, Sam Neill, Stéphane Audran, Alexandra Stewart	Drama	Canada-France co-production made with U.S. financing, and the third Canadian film by French director Claude Chabrol based on the novel by Simone de Beauvoir.
The Cap	Robert A. Duncan		Drama	
Charade	John Minnis		Animated short	Oscar winner
The Children of Soong Ching Ling	Gary Bush		Documentary	
City Girl	Martha Coolidge		Drama	
Covergirl	Jean-Claude Lord		Drama	
The Crime of Ovide Plouffe (Le Crime d'Ovide Plouffe)	Denys Arcand	Gabriel Arcand, Anne Létourneau, Pierre Curzi, Denise Filiatrault, Rémy Girard, Donald Pilon	Drama	Canada-France co-production; Genie Award – Actor (Arcand)
The Dog Who Stopped the War (La Guerre des tuques)	André Melançon	Cédric Jourde, Maripierre D’Amour, Julien Élie	Children's film	The first of producer Rock Demers's Tales for All; Golden Reel Award.
Draw!	Steven Hilliard Stern	Kirk Douglas, James Coburn, Alexandra Bastedo, Derek McGrath, Linda Sorenson	Western	HBO's first feature-length drama made with U.S. financing was released theatrically in Canada; Genie Award - Supporting Actress (Sorenson)
Hockey Night	Paul Shapiro		Drama	
Hookers on Davie	Janis Cole & Holly Dale		Documentary	
The Hotel New Hampshire	Tony Richardson	Jodie Foster, Beau Bridges, Rob Lowe, Nastassja Kinski, Wilford Brimley, Wallace Shawn	Family drama	Based on the novel by John Irving; Canada-U.K. co-production made with U.S. financing
Les Illusions tranquilles	Gilles Blais		Documentary	
Incident at Restigouche	Alanis Obomsawin		Documentary	
Isaac Littlefeathers	Les Rose	William Korbut, Lou Jacobi, Scott Hylands	Drama	
Jacques and November (Jacques et Novembre)	Jean Beaudry and François Bouvier	Jean Beaudry	Faux-documentary	
Le jour S...	Jean Pierre Lefebvre	Pierre Curzi, Marie Tifo	Drama	Screened at the 1984 Cannes Film Festival
The Last Glacier (Le dernier glacier)	Jacques Leduc, Roger Frappier			
Listen to the City	Ron Mann		Drama	
Louisiana	Philippe De Broca	Margot Kidder, Ian Charleson, Victor Lanoux, Andréa Ferreol, Lloyd Bochner	Costume drama	Canada-France co-production
Margaret Atwood: Once in August	Michael Rubbo	Margaret Atwood	National Film Board documentary	
Mario	Jean Beaudin	Xavier Norman Petermann, Jacques Godin	Drama	Genie Awards – Cinematography, Sound, Musical Score
The Masculine Mystique	John N. Smith, Giles Walker	Stefan Wodoslawsky, Sam Grana, Mort Ransen	National Film Board feature	
Memoirs	Bashar Shbib		Drama	
Mother's Meat and Freud's Flesh	Demetrios Estdelacropolis	Demetrios Estdelacropolis, Esther Vargas	Comedy-drama	
My Kind of Town	Charles Wilkinson	Peter Smith, Tina Schliessler, John Cooper	Drama	
Next of Kin	Atom Egoyan	Patrick Tierney, Arsinée Khanjian	Drama	Atom Egoyan's first feature
No More Hiroshima	Martin Duckworth		National Film Board documentary	Genie Award for best short documentary
One Night Stand	John Duigan		Drama	Canada-Australia coproduction
The Painted Door	Bruce Pittman	Linda Goranson, Eric Peterson, August Schellenberg	Short drama	
Paradise	Ishu Patel		National Film Board animated short	Academy Award– Animated Short; Berlin Film Festival – Silver Plaque for Cultural/ Documentary Film
Productivity and Performance by Alex K.	Tony Currie	Bruce Pirrie, Michael Ferguson, Peter McBurnie, Pandora Richardson, Carl Zittrer	Comedy, educational	
Reno and the Doc	Charles Dennis	Kenneth Welsh, Linda Griffiths	Comedy	
Slim Obsession	Donald Shebib	Susan Wright, Paul Kelman, Kerrie Keane	Drama	1984 Chris Bronze Plaque, Columbus Festival; 1985 ACTRA Award for Best Actress (Susan Wright)
Sonatine	Micheline Lanctôt	Pascale Bussières, Marcia Pilote, Pierre Fauteux	Drama	Genie Awards – Director; Venice Film Festival – Silver Lion
The Surrogate	Don Carmody	Art Hindle, Carole Laure, Shannon Tweed, Jackie Burroughs	Thriller	
The Terrapin (La Terrapène)	Michel Bouchard	Julien Davy, Alexandra Stewart	Short drama	
That's My Baby!	John Bradshaw, Edie Yolles	Sonja Smits, Timothy Webber, Lenore Zann, Derek McGrath, Les Carlson	Comedy	
Thrillkill	Anthony D'Andrea	Gina Massey, Robin Ward	Crime thriller	
Unfinished Business	Don Owen	Isabelle Mejias, Peter Spence, Peter Kastner	Drama	
Walls	Tom Shandel	Winston Rekert, Andrée Pelletier	Drama	
Waterwalker	Bill Mason		Documentary	
A Woman in Transit (La Femme de l'hôtel)	Léa Pool	Louise Marleau, Paule Baillargeon, Marthe Turgeon, Serge Dupire	Drama	Genie Awards – Actress (Marleau), Song; Toronto Festival of Festivals – Best Canadian Feature
The Years of Dreams and Revolt (Les Années de rêve)	Jean-Claude Labrecque	Gilbert Sicotte, Anne-Marie Provencher, Monique Mercure	Drama	

== See also ==
- 1984 in Canada
- 1984 in Canadian television
