= 6th Genie Awards =

1985 Canadian film awards

- Date: March 21, 1985
- Site: Metro Toronto Convention Centre
- Hosted by: Al Waxman; Kerrie Keane

Highlights
- Best Picture: The Bay Boy
- Most awards: The Bay Boy (6)
- Most nominations: The Bay Boy (11)

Television coverage
- Network: CBC Television

The 6th Genie Awards were held on March 21, 1985, to honour Canadian films released in 1984.

Only four films were nominated for Best Motion Picture this year; two additional films tied for the fifth spot, and the academy opted to nominate four films rather than extend the category to six. However, similar ties in other categories did result in six nominations.

This year, the academy expanded its mandate to include television and the new name of the academy became The Academy of Canadian Cinema and Television. For the English-language TV awards, a membership campaign was launched at the Banff Television Festival, and a committee was formed to create the Gemini Awards for television, which premiered in December 1986.

In Quebec, support for the academy remained mixed but there was strong support for television awards. A full-time office was established in Montreal to organize the awards; the Prix Gémeaux were launched in February 1987.

The academy also struck a co-production deal with the CBC Television, contributing financing and its own producer. The national broadcast of the event, which was hosted by actors Al Waxman and Kerrie Keane, drew 1.9 million viewers.

== Nominees and winners ==
Motion Picture	Direction
The Bay Boy — Denis Héroux, John Kemeny; The Dog Who Stopped the War (La Guerre des tuques) — Nicole Robert, Rock Demers; Mario — Jean Beaudin, Hélène Verrier; A Woman in Transit (La Femme de l'hôtel) — Bernadette Payeur	Micheline Lanctôt, Sonatine; Atom Egoyan, Next of Kin; Jean Pierre Lefebvre, Le jour S...; Don Owen, Unfinished Business; Léa Pool, A Woman in Transit (La Femme de l'hôtel)
Actor in a leading role	Actress in a leading role
Gabriel Arcand, The Crime of Ovide Plouffe (Le Crime d'Ovide Plouffe); Xavier Norman Petermann, Mario; Winston Rekert, Walls; Kiefer Sutherland, The Bay Boy; Kenneth Welsh, Reno and the Doc	Louise Marleau, A Woman in Transit (La Femme de l'hôtel); Pascale Bussières, Sonatine; Linda Griffiths, Reno and the Doc; Isabelle Mejias, Unfinished Business; Andrée Pelletier, Walls; Sonja Smits, That's My Baby!
Actor in a supporting role	Actress in a supporting role
Alan Scarfe, The Bay Boy; John Cooper, My Kind of Town; Peter Donat, The Bay Boy; Donald Pilon, The Crime of Ovide Plouffe (Le Crime d'Ovide Plouffe); Peter Spence, Unfinished Business	Linda Sorenson, Draw!; Jackie Burroughs, The Surrogate; Barbara Law, Bedroom Eyes; Elizabeth Leigh-Milne, Walls; Jane McKinnon, The Bay Boy; Leah Pinsent, The Bay Boy
Documentary	Best Theatrical Short
Raoul Wallenberg: Buried Alive — David Harel and Wayne Arron; Hookers on Davie — Holly Dale and Janis Cole; To the Rhythm of My Heart (Au rythme de mon coeur) — Jean Pierre Lefebvre	Charade — Jon Minnis; I Think of You Often — Scott Barrie; Productivity and Performance by Alex K. — Nicolas Stiliadis and Syd Cappe; The Terrapin (La Terrapène) — Michel Bouchard and Jacques Pettigrew
Art Direction/Production Design	Cinematography
Wolf Kroeger, The Bay Boy; Denis Boucher, Mario; Bill Brodie, Draw!; Vianney Gauthier, The Years of Dreams and Revolt (Les Années de rêves); Jocelyn Joly, The Crime of Ovide Plouffe (Le Crime d'Ovide Plouffe)	Pierre Mignot, Mario; John Clement, Thrillkill; Laszlo George, Draw!; Ed Higginson, Isaac Littlefeathers; Douglas Kiefer, Unfinished Business; François Protat, The Crime of Ovide Plouffe (Le Crime d'Ovide Plouffe)
Costume Design	Editing
Renée April, The Bay Boy; Huguette Gagné, The Dog Who Stopped the War (La Guerre des tuques); Wendy Partridge, Isaac Littlefeathers; Nicole Pelletier, The Crime of Ovide Plouffe (Le Crime d'Ovide Plouffe); Hélène Schneider, Sonatine	André Corriveau, The Dog Who Stopped the War (La Guerre des tuques); Monique Fortier, The Crime of Ovide Plouffe (Le Crime d'Ovide Plouffe); Frank Irvine, My Kind of Town
Overall Sound	Sound Editing
Bruce Nyznik, Richard Besse and Hans Peter Strobl, Mario; David Appleby, Christopher Tate, Don White and Garrell Clark, Isaac Littlefeathers; Serge Beauchemin, Austin Grimaldi and Don White, The Dog Who Stopped the War (La Guerre des tuques); Joe Grimaldi, Dino Pigat, Richard Lightstone and Austin Grimaldi, Draw!; Patrick Rousseau, David Appleby and Don White, The Bay Boy	Charles Bowers and Peter Burgess, The Bay Boy; Michel B. Bordeleau, That's My Baby!; David Evans and Wayne Griffin, Mario; Jim Hopkins, Draw!; Claude Langlois and Louise Coté, The Dog Who Stopped the War (La Guerre des tuques); Michael O'Farrell and Peter Thilaye, Isaac Littlefeathers
Achievement in Music: Original Score	Achievement in Music: Original Song
François Dompierre, Mario; J. Douglas Dodd and Michael Oczko, Walls; Germain Gauthier, The Dog Who Stopped the War (La Guerre des tuques); François Lanctôt, Sonatine; Betty Lazebnik, Reno and the Doc; Paul Zaza, Isaac Littlefeathers	Yves Laferrière, Marjolène Morin and Paule Baillargeon, "Touch Me" — A Woman in Transit (La Femme de l'hôtel); Germain Gauthier, Robert Léger and Daniele Faubert, "L'Amour a pris son temps" — The Dog Who Stopped the War (La Guerre des tuques); Betty Lazebnik and Charles Dennis, "A Little Piece of Forever" — Reno and the Doc
Screenplay	Special awards
Daniel Petrie, The Bay Boy; Micheline Lanctôt, Sonatine; Michel Langlois and Léa Pool, A Woman in Transit (La Femme de l'hôtel); Don Owen, Unfinished Business	Air Canada Award: Don Haig; Golden Reel Award: The Dog Who Stopped the War (La Guerre des tuques); Special Achievement: Ivan Reitman, Paul LeBlanc
