= Schliessler =

Schliessler is a surname. Notable people with the surname include:

- Martin Schliessler (1929–2008), German adventurer, cinematographer, and sculptor
- Tobias A. Schliessler (born 1958), German cinematographer
