= Little feather =

Little feather or Littlefeather may refer to:

- Achillea millefolium, plant known as yarrow or little feather
- Sacheen Littlefeather (1946–2022), an American actress and activist
- Isaac Littlefeathers, a 1984 Canadian film
