= 55th parallel =

55th parallel may refer to:

- 55th parallel north, a circle of latitude in the Northern Hemisphere
- 55th parallel south, a circle of latitude in the Southern Hemisphere
- Latitude 55°, a 1982 Canadian film
