= Terrapin (disambiguation) =

A terrapin is a turtle living in fresh or brackish water.

Terrapin may also refer to:

- Terrapin (amphibious vehicle), a World War II transport vehicle used by the Allies
- "Terrapin" (song), a 1970 song by Syd Barrett
- "The Terrapin", a short story by Patricia Highsmith
- Terrapin attack, a cryptographic attack on the Secure Shell Protocol
- Terrapin Beer Company, a brewery in Athens, Georgia, US
- "Terrapin Part 1", a 1977 song by Grateful Dead
- HMS Terrapin (P323), a World War II British submarine
- Maryland Terrapins, the athletic teams of the University of Maryland
- Baltimore Terrapins, a baseball team in the short-lived Federal League from 1914–15
  - Terrapin Park, the original name of the fifth Oriole Park
- Portable classroom or terrapin, a temporary school building
- "Terrapin", a 2024 song by Clairo

== See also ==
- Terrapin Station, a 1977 album by Grateful Dead
- Terrapene, the Latin name for the box turtle genus (which does not include terrapins)
