= Wendy Partridge =

British–born Canadian costume designer

Wendy Partridge (born September 20, 1954) is a British–Canadian costume designer in film and television.

Partridge was nominated for a Primetime Emmy Award for Outstanding Costumes for a Miniseries, Movie, or Special for her work on the 2006 two-part AMC series Broken Trail. She won a Canadian Screen Award for Best Costume Design for the 2014 film Pompeii and Genie Awards for Best Costume Design for Passchendaele (2008) and Loyalties (1986). She was nominated three times in one year at the 2013 Canadian Screen Awards for Resident Evil: Retribution, Silent Hill: Revelation, and Hannah's Law. Marvel Cinematic Universe film Thor: The Dark World and Guillermo del Toro's Hellboy have earned her Saturn Award nominations.

Partridge got her first dressmaking job at 14 years old whilst still in England. She moved to Edmonton in the 1970s and to Calgary in 1986. She designed the costumes for the opening and closing ceremonies of the 1988 Winter Olympics. She also designed the World War I-style uniforms that were worn at the First inauguration of Barack Obama in 2009 as well as the costume of Abraham Lincoln.

== Filmography ==
=== Film ===
Year	Title	Notes
1979	Fast Company	
1980	The Hounds of Notre Dame	
1981	The High Country	
1981	Firebird 2015 AD	
1982	Latitude 55°	
1983	Running Brave	
1984	Isaac Littlefeathers	
1984	Change of Heart	
1986	Hyper Sapien: People from Another Star	
1986	Loyalties	
1987	The Big Town	
1987	Prairie Women	
1990	The Comic Book Christmas Caper	
1998	Heart of the Sun	
2000	Snow Day	
2000	Highlander: Endgame	
2001	Texas Rangers	
2002	Blade II	
2003	The Hitcher II: I've Been Waiting	Direct-to-video
2003	Underworld	
2004	Hellboy	
2005	Fantastic Four	
2005	The Cave	
2006	Underworld: Evolution	
2006	Silent Hill	
2007	Resurrecting the Champ	
2008	Passchendaele	
2009	Underworld: Rise of the Lycans	
2009	Whiteout	
2010	Legion	
2010	The Last Rites of Ransom Pride	
2011	Conan the Barbarian	
2011	Western Confidential	
2012	Resident Evil: Retribution	
2012	Silent Hill: Revelation	
2013	Thor: The Dark World	
2014	Pompeii	
2018	Knuckleball	
2019	Togo	

=== Television ===
Year	Title	Notes
1984	Draw!	Television film
1985	Bridge to Terabithia	Television film
1985	Murder in Space	Television film
1986	The Park is Mine	Television film
1986	Vanishing Act	Television film
1986	Popeye Doyle	Television film
1986	Easy Prey	Television film
1990–1992	The Ray Bradbury Theater	
1992	Call of the Wild	Television film
1993	Ordeal in the Arctic	Television film
1994	How the West Was Fun	Television film
1995	Children of the Dust	Miniseries
1995	Convict Cowboy	Television film
1995	Black Fox	Miniseries
1995–1996	Lonesome Dove: The Outlaw Years	
1995	The Song Spinner	Television film
1996	In Cold Blood	Miniseries
1997	Heart Full of Rain	Television film
1997	Honey, I Shrunk the Kids: The TV Show	Episode: "Honey, I Shrunk the Science Dude"
1999	You Know My Name	Television film
2000	A Father's Choice	Television film
2000	High Noon	Television film
2001	Anatomy of a Hate Crime	Television film
2001	Almost America	Television film
2004	Call Me: The Rise and Fall of Heidi Fleiss	Television film
2006	Broken Trail	Part 2
2006	Ultra	Television film
2007	The Secret of the Nutcracker	Television film
2008	The Other Woman	Television film
2009	Prayers for Bobby	Docudrama
2011–2012	Hell on Wheels	Season 1
2012	Hannah's Law	Television film
2013	When Calls the Heart	Television film
2016	Timeless	Pilot
2016	Van Helsing	Season 1
2020	Shadow and Bone	

== Awards and nominations ==
Year	Award	Category	Work	Result
1983	Genie Awards	Best Costume Design	Latitude 55°	Nominated
1985	Genie Awards	Best Costume Design	Isaac Littlefeathers	Nominated
1987	Genie Awards	Best Costume Design	Loyalties	Won
2002	Genie Awards	Best Costume Design	Almost America	Nominated
2005	Saturn Awards	Best Costume	Hellboy	Nominated
2007	Primetime Emmy Awards	Outstanding Costumes for a Miniseries, Movie, or Special	Broken Trail (with Kathleen Morley)	Nominated
2008	Genie Awards	Best Costume Design	Passchendaele	Won
2012	Canadian Screen Awards	Best Costume Design	Resident Evil: Retribution	Nominated
2012	Canadian Screen Awards	Best Costume Design	Silent Hill: Revelation	Nominated
2012	Canadian Screen Awards	Best Costume Design	Hannah's Law	Nominated
2014	Canadian Screen Awards	Best Costume Design	Pompeii	Won
2014	Saturn Awards	Best Costume	Thor: The Dark World	Nominated
