= Kim Yaroshevskaya =

Canadian actress (1923–2025)

Kim Yaroshevskaya CM
- Ким Ярошевская
- Born: 1 October 1923; Moscow, Russian SFSR, USSR
- Died: 12 January 2025 (aged 101); Canada
- Occupation: Actress
- Known for: Fanfreluche; Passe-Partout; Home Fires

Kim Yaroshevskaya CM (1 October 1923 – 12 January 2025) was a Russian-born Canadian film, television and stage actress. Best known to audiences in Quebec as a children's entertainer, starring in series such as Fanfreluche and Passe-Partout in the 1970s, she also had a starring role in the English Canadian drama series Home Fires in the early 1980s.

== Background ==
Born in Moscow, Soviet Union, Kim Yaroshevskaya (her forename is actually the acronym of the International Communist Youth organization in Russian, KIM) emigrated to Quebec at age ten with her family. In the 1950s, she was a founding member of the Quebec theatre collective Théâtre Le Grenier, with whom she created Fanfreluche.

== Career ==
Her other film and television roles included A Woman in Transit (La Femme de l'hôtel), The Alley Cat (Le Matou), Anne Trister, Sonia, Straight for the Heart (À corps perdu), The Sex of the Stars (Le Sexe des étoiles) and L'Amour avec un Grand A. Her stage roles included productions of Aristophanes' Lysistrata, Samuel Beckett's Play, Jean-Pierre Ronfard's Le Grand théâtre du monde, Athol Fugard's The Road to Mecca and Ted Galay's After Baba's Funeral and Sweet and Sour Pickles.

In later years, she published several works of children's literature, including La Petite Kim (Little Kim's Doll), Contes de fanfreluche, tome 1 : Connaissez-vous le petit chaperon bleu et petit chaperon jaune? and Contes d'humour et de sagesse. In November 2017, Yaroshevskaya, then aged 94, released her biography, Mon voyage en Amérique.

== Honours ==
Yaroshevskaya was nominated for an ACTRA Award in 1981 for her role in Home Fires. She was appointed a Member of the Order of Canada (CM) in 1991, and was awarded the Queen Elizabeth II Golden Jubilee Medal and Queen Elizabeth II Diamond Jubilee Medal.

In 2017 she was appointed to the Order of Arts and Letters of Quebec.

== Personal life and death ==
On 1 October 2023, Yaroshevskaya celebrated her 100th birthday. She died on 12 January 2025 at the age of 101 following a fall.
