= The Truth About Alex =

1986 TV drama film

- Based on: Counterplay by Ann Synder; Louis Pelletier
- Written by: Craig Storper
- Directed by: Paul Shapiro
- Starring: Scott Baio; Peter Spence
- Music by: Fred Mollin
- Countries of origin: United States; Canada
- Original language: English

Production
- Executive producers: John Brunton; Jane Startz; John Matoian
- Producer: Martin Harbury
- Production location: Oshawa, Ontario
- Editor: Margaret Van Eerdewijk
- Running time: 49 minutes
- Production companies: Insight Productions; Scholastic Productions

Original release
- Network: Global
- Release: 1986
- Network: HBO
- Release: 1987

The Truth About Alex is a 1986 made-for-television drama film directed by Paul Shapiro. The movies stars Scott Baio as Brad and Peter Spence as Alex. It is based on the book Counterplay by Ann Snyder and Louis Pelletier. The film aired on Global TV in Canada in 1986 and in the United States on HBO in 1987. The movie received a 1987 Gemini Award for Best Short Drama and one for Best Photography in a Dramatic Program or Series and was nominated for two additional awards. The film also received a CINE Golden Eagle Award and a CableACE Award.

== Plot ==
Brad is the star quarterback headed for West Point. His best friend Alex is the team's wide receiver and a gifted pianist. When Alex stops at a local gas station's bathroom during a jog, a trucker makes a pass at Alex. When the teenager resists, the trucker beats him up and spits on him, and accuses Alex of putting the moves on him. A panicked Alex tells Brad what happened, who suggests calling the police, but Alex is reluctant to, and eventually tells Brad that he is gay. Once the truth about Alex begins to spread at his school, both of them are faced with bigotry from their homophobic coach and teammates. And Brad's girlfriend Kay is not happy either because she resents how his friendship with Alex is affecting their social status as the school's coolest couple. Brad's father, Major Stevens orders him to stay away from Alex, because it could jeopardize his commission to West Point, while Alex's mom and dad are completely supportive of their son. In the end, at the big game to secure the school's winning record, Brad throws a pass to Alex, which scores the touchdown that wins the game. Brad defies his father and refuses to end his friendship with Alex.

== Cast ==
- Scott Baio as Brad Stevens
- Peter Spence as Alex Prager
- Jessica Steen as Kay
- Robin Ward as Mr. Prager
- Elva Mai Hoover as Mrs. Prager
- Michael J. Reynolds as Major Stevens
- J. Winston Carroll as Coach McAveely
- Barry Greene as Truck Driver
- Peter Millard as Sheriff
- Tim Burd as Bartender
- Polli Magaro as Marsha
- Jeremy Ratchford as Dutch
- Kelly Rowan as Ellie Sanders
- Ivan Beaulieu as Billy
- Donald Burda as Robin

== Critical reception ==
Will Kohler wrote in his review that the movie "has all the trappings of an after-school special — the stern military dad, the gruff coach, peer-pressure anguish, the big game, but let’s remember that it was 1986 when this movie was made...and while it did try, it fell flat for not offering any romantic hope for Alex, whose less-than-uplifting connections with the gay community range from a fag-bashing at the hands of a closeted truck driver to a wistful conversation with a guy at a stereotypical gay bar, but for its time it does make a painfully earnest plea for tolerance."

Brian Dillard wrote in TV Guide that the movie "actually carried a fairly groundbreaking gay-rights message upon its release...but its portrayal of Alex's plight is no more formulaic than any number of theatrical features that crowded art houses during the indie film boon of the 1990s." He was impressed with the acting, saying "Peter Spence turns in a sensitive performance, while Scott Baio proves singularly suited to play Brad." Steven Capsuto wrote in his book, that the movie is "one of the only TV dramas about a gay teen who is self-assured and secure in his identity from the start, and whose parents accept him when they find out...and that Brad crosses his coach, his girlfriend, his teammates and his father to be a loyal best friend."

== Nominations and awards ==
- Gemini Award for Best Short Drama (winner)
- Gemini Award for Best Photography in a Dramatic Program or Series (winner)
- Gemini Award for Best Picture Editing in a Dramatic Program or Series (nominated)
- Gemini Award for Best Sound in a Dramatic Program or Series (nominated)
- CINE Golden Eagle Award (winner)
- CableACE Award Children's Entertainment Special or Series (winner)
