= Ann Medina =

Canadian journalist and producer

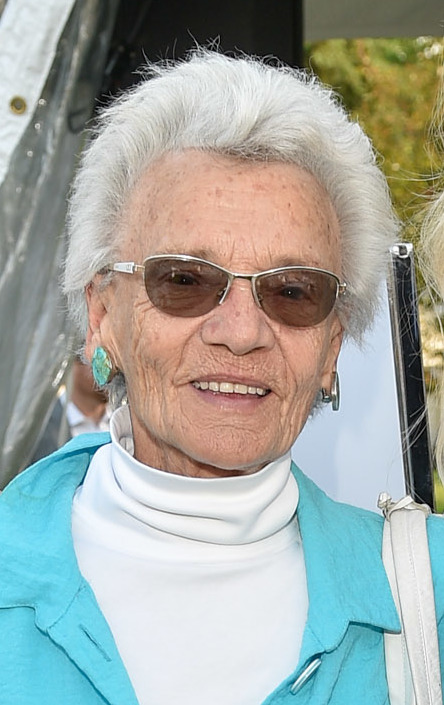
- Ann Medina at the 2019 CFC Annual Garden Party
- Occupation: Journalist

Ann Medina is an American Canadian television journalist and documentary producer.

== Biography ==
Born and raised in New York City, Medina studied philosophy at Wellesley College, Harvard University and the University of Edinburgh before getting her M.A. in philosophy from the University of Chicago. She began her television career in Chicago, later becoming a network producer for NBC News, and then a network correspondent and producer for ABC News. While at ABC, she produced documentaries for its network Close-Up series.

In 1975, Medina moved to Canada to marry CTV producer and host Jack McGaw. They divorced amicably after eight years.

She worked for the Canadian Broadcasting Corporation's Newsmagazine and later became its executive producer.

She joined CBC's The Journal when it began in 1982, becoming its senior foreign correspondent, focusing on stories in the Mideast, but also reporting from China, Nicaragua, Northern Ireland, Africa, Bhopal and elsewhere. In 1983-84 she was the Beirut bureau chief for CBC's The National and The Journal. Her documentaries aired regularly on BBC's Newsnight and PBS' MacNeil-Lehrer Report.

Her reports and documentaries have won numerous awards in Canada and in the United States, including an Emmy Award.

Medina was one of the first residents at Norman Jewison's Canadian Film Centre. She continues to contribute in the field of journalism. She moderated the 1993, 1997, and 2000 Canadian federal election debates, and the 1995 and 1999 Ontario provincial election debates in addition to hosting CBC Newsworld's documentary series Rough Cuts. As of 2016, she was host of History Television's programs History on Film and Fact and Film.

Medina has also moved into the broader area of communications and technology. She has addressed the United Nations' World Television Conference, the CBC's Board of Directors, the North American Broadcasters Association and the World Conference on the Arts, in addition to many major corporate clients including Perigee, Viacom, Honda, and Heenan Blaikie. She also served on the Ontario Advisory Committee on Technology and Education and on the Advisory Board to Foreign Minister Lloyd Axworthy.

She is past chair of both the Academy of Canadian Cinema and Television and the Cultural Industries Council of Ontario. And she has served on the boards of TVOntario, the Calmeadow Foundation, Toronto Women in Film and Television, ACTRA, I.C.E. Communications, and Humber College. She also co-chaired the 2003 Conference of the International Women's Forum.

She has received honorary degrees from the University of Toronto, the University of King's College, the University of New Brunswick, Brock University, and Mount Saint Vincent University.

Medina has also played a television reporter in the films Zero Patience, Unfinished Business, and Dangerous Offender: The Marlene Moore Story.
