= Lianna =

1983 film by John Sayles

- Theatrical release poster
- Directed by: John Sayles
- Screenplay by: John Sayles
- Produced by: Jeffrey Nelson; Maggie Renzi
- Starring: Linda Griffiths; Jane Hallaren; Jon DeVries
- Cinematography: Austin De Besche
- Edited by: John Sayles
- Music by: Mason Daring
- Distributed by: United Artists Classics
- Release date: January 18, 1983 (United States)
- Running time: 110 minutes
- Country: United States
- Language: English
- Budget: $300,000 (estimated)
- Box office: $1.5 million

Lianna is a 1983 drama film written and directed by John Sayles and starring Linda Griffiths, Jane Hallaren, and Jon DeVries. Additionally, It marked Chris Elliott's film debut.

== Plot ==
Lianna is married to a college professor in film and media at a university in a midsized New Jersey town and has two children. In order to give her husband the greater freedom he wants and address her boredom, she takes a child psychology class with her friend, Sandy.

Becoming more involved in the class, she realizes she has a crush on the instructor, Ruth. Ruth invites Lianna home for dinner and they talk into the night, Lianna explaining that she was a graduate student and married her professor. They eventually begin an affair, complicated by Lianna's husband's affair with a student. Lianna expresses interest in leaving her husband for Ruth, but Ruth backs away, warning Lianna that living with another woman would jeopardize her career and that she has a partner in another city.

Lianna leaves her husband after a fight to live alone for the first time in years. She visits a lesbian bar and attempts to connect with other lesbians through affairs to explore her new identity. The film explores her loneliness, her changing relationships with her children, and her new relationship with Sandy, who is shocked at Lianna's revelations at first, but slowly begins to accept it and support Lianna. Lianna also gets a job as a supermarket cashier.

Ruth leaves town and Lianna's life to California for another teaching job. Despite now being alone, Lianna and Sandy reconcile in the final scene which mirrors the opening scene of Lianna and Sandy talking at a park playground.

== Cast ==
- Linda Griffiths as Lianna Massey
- Jane Hallaren as Ruth Brennan
- Jon DeVries as Dick Massey
- Jo Henderson as Sandy
- Jessica MacDonald as Theda Massey
- Jesse Solomon as Spencer Massey
- John Sayles as Jerry Carlson
- Stephen Mendillo as Bob
- Betsy Julia Robinson as Cindy
- Nancy Mette as Kim
- Maggie Renzi as Sheila
- Madelyn Coleman as Mrs. Hennessy
- Chris Elliott as Lighting Assistant
- Rochelle Oliver as Betty

== Reception ==
The staff at Variety gave the film a positive review and wrote "John Sayles again uses a keen intelligence and finely tuned ear to tackle the nature of friendship and loving in Lianna." They especially praised the acting and the supporting characters' reactions to Lianna's lesbian affair.

In his New York Times review, Vincent Canby wrote: "Though Mr. Sayles's methods are antidramatic, the film is full of the kind of middle-class desperation that seldom finds its way into movies, where emotions are usually bigger than life. Lianna is never dull but it is so finely tuned that one has to pay attention to receive it properly. It doesn't knock you off your feet, slam you against the wall or leave you gasping for breath. It's civilized."

In a joint review of Lianna and another John Sayles film, Baby It's You, Michael Sragow commented that Sayles has his strengths but is considerably overrated, and compared both films unfavorably to his earlier Return of the Secaucus 7. He elaborated that Lianna is too ideologically single-minded while failing to offer any new insight or perspective on the subject of lesbianism. He also criticized the "truly embarrassing audiovisual montages", citing as an example the lesbian love scene being accompanied by the sounds of the women whispering in French.

Reviewing Lianna's release on DVD, film critic Glenn Erickson called it "daring" and "sophisticated". He found the film's strongest point to be that rather than becoming a "melodrama" of scandal, it focuses on the protagonist's isolation and self-discovery. By his analysis, the film "sidesteps position statements and stresses intimate character touches. Lianna doesn't ask us to condemn or condone anything, but simply to be understanding and sympathetic with each other."

Critics Frederic and Mary Ann Brussat wrote: "The screenplay by John Sayles is both congenial and wise... Viewers are sure to find much to savor in the moral and emotional confrontations. Lianna muses upon love, friendship, and camaraderie in a fresh but unspectacular way. It is an appealing movie worth experiencing."
