= Paper Marriage =

1988 Hong Kong film by Alfred Cheung

- Film poster
- Traditional Chinese: 過埠新娘
- Simplified Chinese: 过埠新娘
- Hanyu Pinyin: Guò Bù Xīn Niáng
- Jyutping: Gwo3 Fau6 San1 Neong2
- Directed by: Alfred Cheung
- Written by: Alfred Cheung; Keith Wong
- Produced by: Choi Wing-cheong
- Starring: Sammo Hung; Maggie Cheung
- Cinematography: Jimmy Leung
- Edited by: Peter Cheung
- Music by: Joseph Koo; Sherman Chow
- Production companies: Golden Harvest; Bo Ho Films
- Release date: 14 April 1988
- Running time: 87 minutes
- Country: Hong Kong
- Languages: Cantonese; English
- Box office: HK$13,405,571

Paper Marriage (Chinese: 過埠新娘; Jyutping: Gwo3 Fau6 San1 Neong2) is a 1988 Hong Kong action comedy film directed and co-written by Alfred Cheung, and starring Sammo Hung and Maggie Cheung. It was released by Golden Harvest on 14 April 1988.

== Plot ==
In the United States, a down-on-his-luck Chinese boxer named Bo Chin accepts promise of payment to marry a Hong Kong woman named Jade Lee so she can get American citizenship. They realize too late that they have been set up in a complicated plan to cheat them out of the woman's money. Their adventures begin when Bo is forced back into the boxing ring and Jade tries her hand at mud wrestling.

== Cast ==
- Sammo Hung as Bo Chin
- Maggie Cheung as Jade Lee
- Alfred Cheung as Peter
- Dick Wei as "White Suit"
- Joyce Godenzi as Bo's ex-wife
- Billy Chow as "Big Bear"
- Hsiao Hou, Chin Ka-lok, and Tony Morelli as White Suit's thugs
- Philip Ko as Crazy Eyes
- Frank Pang Lee as Uncle Tsai
- Meg Lam as Immigration Control Officer
- Rainbow Ching as Immigration Officer Chin
- Lee Chi-kit as Debt Collector
- Rocky Li

== Production ==
Although Paper Marriage is set in Los Angeles, California, the film was shot in Edmonton, Alberta. The opening sequence was shot at Northlands Park, while the final action sequence being shot at the West Edmonton Mall.

Yuen Wah and Lam Ching-ying were the film's action directors.
