= Canadian Screen Award for Best Actress =

Retired annual Canadian media award

The Academy of Canadian Cinema & Television presents an annual award for Best Performance by an Actress in a Leading Role to the best performance by a lead actress in a Canadian film. The award was first presented in 1968 by the Canadian Film Awards, and was presented annually until 1978 with the exception of 1969, when no eligible feature films were submitted for award consideration, and 1974 due to the cancellation of the awards that year.

From 1980 until 2012, the award was presented as part of the Genie Awards ceremony; since 2013, it has been presented as part of the Canadian Screen Awards.

From 1980 to 1983, only Canadian actresses were eligible for the award; non-Canadian actresses appearing in Canadian films were instead considered for the separate Genie Award for Best Performance by a Foreign Actress. After 1983, the latter award was discontinued, and from 1986 both Canadian and foreign actresses were eligible for Best Performance by an Actress in a Leading Role.

In August 2022, the academy announced that it will discontinue its past practice of presenting gendered awards for film and television actors and actresses; beginning with the 11th Canadian Screen Awards in 2023, gender-neutral awards for Best Performance will be presented, with eight nominees per category instead of five. Lead performances are now honoured with the Canadian Screen Award for Best Lead Performance in a Film.

== 1960s ==
Year	Nominee	Film	Ref
1968; 20th Canadian Film Awards
1968; 20th Canadian Film Awards	Geneviève Bujold	Isabel	
1969; 21st Canadian Film Awards
1969; 21st Canadian Film Awards	No award presented this year		

== 1970s ==
Year	Nominee	Film	Ref
1970; 22nd Canadian Film Awards
1970; 22nd Canadian Film Awards	Geneviève Bujold	The Act of the Heart	
1971; 23rd Canadian Film Awards
1971; 23rd Canadian Film Awards	Ann Knox	The Only Thing You Know	
1972; 24th Canadian Film Awards
1972; 24th Canadian Film Awards	Micheline Lanctôt	The True Nature of Bernadette (La Vraie Nature de Bernadette)	
1973; 25th Canadian Film Awards
1973; 25th Canadian Film Awards	Geneviève Bujold	Kamouraska	
1974
1974	No award presented		
1975; 26th Canadian Film Awards
1975; 26th Canadian Film Awards	Margot Kidder	A Quiet Day in Belfast	
1976; 27th Canadian Film Awards
1976; 27th Canadian Film Awards	Marilyn Lightstone	Lies My Father Told Me	
1977; 28th Canadian Film Awards
1977; 28th Canadian Film Awards	Monique Mercure	J.A. Martin Photographer (J.A. Martin photographe)	
1977; 28th Canadian Film Awards	Jayne Eastwood	One Man	
1977; 28th Canadian Film Awards	Carole Laure	The Angel and the Woman (L'Ange et la femme)	
1977; 28th Canadian Film Awards	Hollis McLaren	Outrageous!	
1978; 29th Canadian Film Awards
1978; 29th Canadian Film Awards	Helen Shaver	In Praise of Older Women	
1978; 29th Canadian Film Awards	Micheline Lanctôt	Blood and Guts	
1978; 29th Canadian Film Awards	Celine Lomez	The Silent Partner	
1978; 29th Canadian Film Awards	Andrée Pelletier	Marie-Anne	

== 1980s ==
Year	Nominee	Film	Ref
1980; 1st Genie Awards
1980; 1st Genie Awards	Kate Lynch	Meatballs	
1980; 1st Genie Awards	Micheline Lanctôt	A Scream from Silence (Mourir à tue-tête)	
1980; 1st Genie Awards	Louise Marleau	Heartbreak (L'arrache-cœur)	
1980; 1st Genie Awards	Claire Pimparé	Yesterday	
1980; 1st Genie Awards	Louise Portal	Cordélia	
1981; 2nd Genie Awards
1981; 2nd Genie Awards	Marie Tifo	Good Riddance (Les Bons débarras)	
1981; 2nd Genie Awards	Geneviève Bujold	Final Assignment	
1981; 2nd Genie Awards	Jennifer Dale	Suzanne	
1981; 2nd Genie Awards	Charlotte Laurier	Good Riddance (Les Bons débarras)	
1981; 2nd Genie Awards	Andrée Pelletier	The Handyman (L'Homme à tout faire)	
1982; 3rd Genie Awards
1982; 3rd Genie Awards	Margot Kidder	Heartaches	
1982; 3rd Genie Awards	Kim Cattrall	Ticket to Heaven	
1982; 3rd Genie Awards	Lesleh Donaldson	Funeral Home	
1982; 3rd Genie Awards	Ronalda Jones	Alligator Shoes	
1982; 3rd Genie Awards	Monique Spaziani	Happy Memories (Les Beaux souvenirs)	
1983; 4th Genie Awards
1983; 4th Genie Awards	Rae Dawn Chong	Quest for Fire	
1983; 4th Genie Awards	Sara Botsford	By Design	
1983; 4th Genie Awards	Hélène Loiselle	Sweet Lies and Loving Oaths (Doux aveux)	
1983; 4th Genie Awards	Monique Mercure	Beyond Forty (La Quarantaine)	
1983; 4th Genie Awards	Andrée Pelletier	Latitude 55°	
1984; 5th Genie Awards
1984; 5th Genie Awards	Martha Henry	The Wars	
1984; 5th Genie Awards	Carole Laure	Maria Chapdelaine	
1984; 5th Genie Awards	Barbara March	Deserters	
1984; 5th Genie Awards	Marie Tifo	Lucien Brouillard	
1984; 5th Genie Awards	Marie Tifo	Just a Game (Rien qu'un jeu)	
1985; 6th Genie Awards
1985; 6th Genie Awards	Louise Marleau	A Woman in Transit (La Femme de l'hôtel)	
1985; 6th Genie Awards	Pascale Bussières	Sonatine	
1985; 6th Genie Awards	Linda Griffiths	Reno and the Doc	
1985; 6th Genie Awards	Isabelle Mejias	Unfinished Business	
1985; 6th Genie Awards	Andrée Pelletier	Walls	
1985; 6th Genie Awards	Sonja Smits	That's My Baby!	
1986; 7th Genie Awards
1986; 7th Genie Awards	Margaret Langrick	My American Cousin	
1986; 7th Genie Awards	Charlotte Laurier	The Dame in Colour (La Dame en couleurs)	
1986; 7th Genie Awards	Christine Pak	90 Days	
1986; 7th Genie Awards	Monique Spaziani	The Alley Cat (Le Matou)	
1986; 7th Genie Awards	Mary Steenburgen	One Magic Christmas	
1987; 8th Genie Awards
1987; 8th Genie Awards	Martha Henry	Dancing in the Dark	
1987; 8th Genie Awards	Dorothée Berryman	The Decline of the American Empire (Le Déclin de l'empire américain)	
1987; 8th Genie Awards	Jackie Burroughs	John and the Missus	
1987; 8th Genie Awards	Tantoo Cardinal	Loyalties	
1987; 8th Genie Awards	Helen Shaver	Lost!	
1987; 8th Genie Awards	Marie Tifo	Intimate Power (Pouvoir intime)	
1988; 9th Genie Awards
1988; 9th Genie Awards	Sheila McCarthy	I've Heard the Mermaids Singing	
1988; 9th Genie Awards	Frédérique Collin	Marie in the City (Marie s'en va-t-en ville)	
1988; 9th Genie Awards	Jacinta Cormier	Life Classes	
1988; 9th Genie Awards	Kate Lynch	Taking Care	
1988; 9th Genie Awards	Gabrielle Rose	Family Viewing	
1989; 10th Genie Awards
1989; 10th Genie Awards	Jackie Burroughs	A Winter Tan	
1989; 10th Genie Awards	Geneviève Bujold	Dead Ringers	
1989; 10th Genie Awards	Kerrie Keane	Hitting Home	
1989; 10th Genie Awards	Josette Simon	Milk and Honey	
1989; 10th Genie Awards	Monique Spaziani	The Revolving Doors (Les Portes tournantes)	

== 1990s ==
Year	Nominee	Film	Ref
1990; 11th Genie Awards
1990; 11th Genie Awards	Rebecca Jenkins	Bye Bye Blues	
1990; 11th Genie Awards	Colleen Dewhurst	Termini Station	
1990; 11th Genie Awards	Megan Follows	Termini Station	
1990; 11th Genie Awards	Margaret Langrick	Cold Comfort	
1990; 11th Genie Awards	Gabrielle Rose	Speaking Parts	
1990; 11th Genie Awards	Catherine Wilkening	Jesus of Montreal (Jésus de Montréal)	
1991; 12th Genie Awards
1991; 12th Genie Awards	Pascale Montpetit	H	
1991; 12th Genie Awards	Alice Diabo	The Company of Strangers	
1991; 12th Genie Awards	Cissy Meddings	The Company of Strangers	
1991; 12th Genie Awards	Kate Nelligan	White Room	
1991; 12th Genie Awards	Nina Petronzio	Vincent and Me (Vincent et moi)	
1992; 13th Genie Awards
1992; 13th Genie Awards	Janet Wright	Bordertown Café	
1992; 13th Genie Awards	Janet-Laine Green	The Shower	
1992; 13th Genie Awards	Viveca Lindfors	North of Pittsburgh	
1992; 13th Genie Awards	Enrica Maria Modugno	The Saracen Woman (La Sarrasine)	
1992; 13th Genie Awards	Valerie Pearson	Solitaire	
1993; 14th Genie Awards
1993; 14th Genie Awards	Sheila McCarthy	The Lotus Eaters	
1993; 14th Genie Awards	Élise Guilbault	Cap Tourmente	
1993; 14th Genie Awards	Andrée Lachapelle	Cap Tourmente	
1993; 14th Genie Awards	Pauline Lapointe	La Florida	
1993; 14th Genie Awards	Aloka McLean	The Lotus Eaters	
1994; 15th Genie Awards
1994; 15th Genie Awards	Sandra Oh	Double Happiness	
1994; 15th Genie Awards	Nancy Beatty	Henry & Verlin	
1994; 15th Genie Awards	Geneviève Bujold	My Friend Max (Mon amie Max)	
1994; 15th Genie Awards	Valérie Kaprisky	Desire in Motion (Mouvements du désir)	
1994; 15th Genie Awards	Marie Tifo	Les Pots cassés	
1995; 16th Genie Awards
1995; 16th Genie Awards	Helena Bonham Carter	Margaret's Museum	
1995; 16th Genie Awards	Pascale Bussières	Eldorado	
1995; 16th Genie Awards	Pascale Bussières	When Night Is Falling	
1995; 16th Genie Awards	Pascale Montpetit	Eldorado	
1995; 16th Genie Awards	Isabel Richer	Eldorado	
1996; 17th Genie Awards
1996; 17th Genie Awards	Martha Henry	Long Day's Journey into Night	
1996; 17th Genie Awards	Marie Brassard	Polygraph (Le Polygraphe)	
1996; 17th Genie Awards	Helene Clarkson	Blood and Donuts	
1996; 17th Genie Awards	Brenda Fricker	Swann	
1996; 17th Genie Awards	Louise Portal	Not Me! (Sous-sol)	
1997; 18th Genie Awards
1997; 18th Genie Awards	Molly Parker	Kissed	
1997; 18th Genie Awards	Isabelle Cyr	Karmina	
1997; 18th Genie Awards	Sarah Polley	The Sweet Hereafter	
1997; 18th Genie Awards	Gabrielle Rose	The Sweet Hereafter	
1997; 18th Genie Awards	Alberta Watson	Shoemaker	
1998; 19th Genie Awards
1998; 19th Genie Awards	Sandra Oh	Last Night	
1998; 19th Genie Awards	Anne-Marie Cadieux	Nô	
1998; 19th Genie Awards	Pascale Montpetit	Streetheart (Le Cœur au poing)	
1998; 19th Genie Awards	Ginette Reno	It's Your Turn, Laura Cadieux (C't'à ton tour, Laura Cadieux)	
1998; 19th Genie Awards	Pierrette Robitaille	It's Your Turn, Laura Cadieux (C't'à ton tour, Laura Cadieux)	
1999; 20th Genie Awards
1999; 20th Genie Awards	Sylvie Moreau	Post Mortem	
1999; 20th Genie Awards	Elaine Cassidy	Felicia's Journey	
1999; 20th Genie Awards	Jennifer Ehle	Sunshine	
1999; 20th Genie Awards	Rosemary Harris	Sunshine	
1999; 20th Genie Awards	Mary-Louise Parker	The Five Senses	

== 2000s ==
Year	Nominee	Film	Ref
2000; 21st Genie Awards
2000; 21st Genie Awards	Marie-Josée Croze	Maelström	
2000; 21st Genie Awards	Kim Hunter	Here's to Life!	
2000; 21st Genie Awards	Ginette Reno	Laura Cadieux II (Laura Cadieux...la suite)	
2000; 21st Genie Awards	Pierrette Robitaille	Laura Cadieux II (Laura Cadieux...la suite)	
2000; 21st Genie Awards	Tilda Swinton	Possible Worlds	
2001; 22nd Genie Awards
2001; 22nd Genie Awards	Élise Guilbault	The Woman Who Drinks (La Femme qui boit)	
2001; 22nd Genie Awards	Jillian Fargey	Protection	
2001; 22nd Genie Awards	Anna Friel	The War Bride	
2001; 22nd Genie Awards	Sarah Polley	The Law of Enclosures	
2001; 22nd Genie Awards	Katja Riemann	Desire	
2002; 23rd Genie Awards
2002; 23rd Genie Awards	Arsinée Khanjian	Ararat	
2002; 23rd Genie Awards	Isabelle Blais	Savage Messiah	
2002; 23rd Genie Awards	Molly Parker	Men With Brooms	
2002; 23rd Genie Awards	Deborah Kara Unger	Between Strangers	
2002; 23rd Genie Awards	Polly Walker	Savage Messiah	
2003; 24th Genie Awards
2003; 24th Genie Awards	Sarah Polley	My Life Without Me	
2003; 24th Genie Awards	Rebecca Jenkins	Marion Bridge	
2003; 24th Genie Awards	Micheline Lanctôt	How My Mother Gave Birth to Me During Menopause (Comment ma mère accoucha de moi durant sa ménopause)	
2003; 24th Genie Awards	Molly Parker	Marion Bridge	
2003; 24th Genie Awards	Karine Vanasse	Séraphin: Heart of Stone (Séraphin: un homme et son péché)	
2004; 25th Genie Awards
2004; 25th Genie Awards	Pascale Bussières	Bittersweet Memories (Ma vie en cinémascope)	
2004; 25th Genie Awards	Isabelle Blais	Love and Magnets (Les Aimants)	
2004; 25th Genie Awards	Céline Bonnier	Machine Gun Molly (Monica la mitraille)	
2004; 25th Genie Awards	Emily Hampshire	Blood	
2004; 25th Genie Awards	Jacinthe Laguë	The Five of Us (Elles étaient cinq)	
2005; 26th Genie Awards
2005; 26th Genie Awards	Seema Biswas	Water	
2005; 26th Genie Awards	Gina Chiarelli	See Grace Fly	
2005; 26th Genie Awards	Macha Grenon	Familia	
2005; 26th Genie Awards	Arsinée Khanjian	Sabah	
2005; 26th Genie Awards	Sylvie Moreau	Familia	
2006; 27th Genie Awards
2006; 27th Genie Awards	Julie Le Breton	The Rocket (Maurice Richard)	
2006; 27th Genie Awards	Jodelle Ferland	Tideland	
2006; 27th Genie Awards	Fatou N'Diaye	A Sunday in Kigali (Un dimanche à Kigali)	
2006; 27th Genie Awards	Ginette Reno	A Family Secret (Le secret de ma mère)	
2006; 27th Genie Awards	Sigourney Weaver	Snow Cake	
2007; 28th Genie Awards
2007; 28th Genie Awards	Julie Christie	Away from Her	
2007; 28th Genie Awards	Anne-Marie Cadieux	You (Toi)	
2007; 28th Genie Awards	Elliot Page (Note: Credited as Ellen Page)	The Tracey Fragments	
2007; 28th Genie Awards	Molly Parker	Who Loves the Sun	
2007; 28th Genie Awards	Béatrice Picard	My Aunt Aline (Ma tante Aline)	
2008; 29th Genie Awards
2008; 29th Genie Awards	Ellen Burstyn	The Stone Angel	
2008; 29th Genie Awards	Isabelle Blais	Borderline	
2008; 29th Genie Awards	Marianne Fortier	Mommy Is at the Hairdresser's (Maman est chez le coiffeur)	
2008; 29th Genie Awards	Susan Sarandon	Emotional Arithmetic	
2008; 29th Genie Awards	Preity Zinta	Heaven on Earth	
2009; 30th Genie Awards
2009; 30th Genie Awards	Karine Vanasse	Polytechnique	
2009; 30th Genie Awards	Madeline Ivalu	Before Tomorrow (Le Jour avant le lendemain)	
2009; 30th Genie Awards	Karen LeBlanc	Nurse.Fighter.Boy	
2009; 30th Genie Awards	Carinne Leduc	3 Seasons (3 saisons)	
2009; 30th Genie Awards	Gabrielle Rose	Mothers & Daughters	

== 2010s ==
Year	Nominee	Film	Ref
2010; 31st Genie Awards
2010; 31st Genie Awards	Lubna Azabal	Incendies	
2010; 31st Genie Awards	Tatiana Maslany	Grown Up Movie Star	
2010; 31st Genie Awards	Molly Parker	Trigger	
2010; 31st Genie Awards	Rosamund Pike	Barney's Version	
2010; 31st Genie Awards	Tracy Wright	Trigger	
2011; 32nd Genie Awards
2011; 32nd Genie Awards	Vanessa Paradis	Café de Flore	
2011; 32nd Genie Awards	Catherine De Léan	Nuit #1	
2011; 32nd Genie Awards	Pascale Montpetit	The Girl in the White Coat	
2011; 32nd Genie Awards	Rachel Weisz	The Whistleblower	
2011; 32nd Genie Awards	Michelle Williams	Take This Waltz	
2012; 1st Canadian Screen Awards
2012; 1st Canadian Screen Awards	Rachel Mwanza	War Witch (Rebelle)	
2012; 1st Canadian Screen Awards	Evelyne Brochu	Inch'Allah	
2012; 1st Canadian Screen Awards	Geneviève Bujold	Still Mine	
2012; 1st Canadian Screen Awards	Marilyn Castonguay	L'Affaire Dumont	
2012; 1st Canadian Screen Awards	Suzanne Clément	Laurence Anyways	
2013; 2nd Canadian Screen Awards
2013; 2nd Canadian Screen Awards	Gabrielle Marion-Rivard	Gabrielle	
2013; 2nd Canadian Screen Awards	Cara Gee	Empire of Dirt	
2013; 2nd Canadian Screen Awards	Isabelle Guérard	The Storm Within (Rouge sang)	
2013; 2nd Canadian Screen Awards	Kawennáhere Devery Jacobs	Rhymes for Young Ghouls	
2013; 2nd Canadian Screen Awards	Tatiana Maslany	Cas & Dylan	
2014; 3rd Canadian Screen Awards
2014; 3rd Canadian Screen Awards	Anne Dorval	Mommy	
2014; 3rd Canadian Screen Awards	Ahn Ji-hye	In Her Place	
2014; 3rd Canadian Screen Awards	Julianne Côté	You're Sleeping Nicole (Tu dors Nicole)	
2014; 3rd Canadian Screen Awards	Julianne Moore	Maps to the Stars	
2014; 3rd Canadian Screen Awards	Yoon Da-gyeong	In Her Place	
2015; 4th Canadian Screen Awards
2015; 4th Canadian Screen Awards	Brie Larson	Room	
2015; 4th Canadian Screen Awards	Céline Bonnier	The Passion of Augustine (La Passion d'Augustine)	
2015; 4th Canadian Screen Awards	Leah Fay Goldstein	Diamond Tongues	
2015; 4th Canadian Screen Awards	Karelle Tremblay	Our Loved Ones (Les Êtres chers)	
2015; 4th Canadian Screen Awards	Hadas Yaron	Felix and Meira (Félix et Meira)	
2016; 5th Canadian Screen Awards
2016; 5th Canadian Screen Awards	Tatiana Maslany	The Other Half	
2016; 5th Canadian Screen Awards	Nathalie Doummar	Boundaries (Pays)	
2016; 5th Canadian Screen Awards	Carmen Ejogo	Born to Be Blue	
2016; 5th Canadian Screen Awards	Sasha K. Gordon	Natasha	
2016; 5th Canadian Screen Awards	Bhreagh MacNeil	Werewolf	
2017; 6th Canadian Screen Awards
2017; 6th Canadian Screen Awards	Sally Hawkins	Maudie	
2017; 6th Canadian Screen Awards	Denise Filiatrault	It's the Heart That Dies Last (C'est le cœur qui meurt en dernier)	
2017; 6th Canadian Screen Awards	Shirley Henderson	Never Steady, Never Still	
2017; 6th Canadian Screen Awards	Mahour Jabbari	Ava	
2017; 6th Canadian Screen Awards	Marine Johnson	The Little Girl Who Was Too Fond of Matches (La petite fille qui aimait trop les allumettes)	
2018; 7th Canadian Screen Awards
2018; 7th Canadian Screen Awards	Émilie Bierre	A Colony (Une colonie)	
2018; 7th Canadian Screen Awards	Valeria Henríquez	The Padre	
2018; 7th Canadian Screen Awards	Rose-Marie Perreault	Fake Tattoos (Les faux tatouages)	
2018; 7th Canadian Screen Awards	Brigitte Poupart	Les Salopes, or the Naturally Wanton Pleasure of Skin (Les salopes ou le sucre naturel de la peau)	
2018; 7th Canadian Screen Awards	Carla Turcotte	Sashinka	
2019; 8th Canadian Screen Awards
2019; 8th Canadian Screen Awards	Nahéma Ricci	Antigone	
2019; 8th Canadian Screen Awards	Deragh Campbell	Anne at 13,000 Ft.	
2019; 8th Canadian Screen Awards	Violet Nelson	The Body Remembers When the World Broke Open	
2019; 8th Canadian Screen Awards	Kacey Rohl	White Lie	
2019; 8th Canadian Screen Awards	Elle-Máijá Tailfeathers	The Body Remembers When the World Broke Open	

== 2020s ==
Year	Nominee	Film	Ref
2020; 9th Canadian Screen Awards
2020; 9th Canadian Screen Awards	Michelle Pfeiffer	French Exit	
2020; 9th Canadian Screen Awards	Carrie Coon	The Nest	
2020; 9th Canadian Screen Awards	Carmen Moore	Rustic Oracle	
2020; 9th Canadian Screen Awards	Rosalie Pépin	Vacarme	
2020; 9th Canadian Screen Awards	Madeleine Sims-Fewer	Violation	
2021; 10th Canadian Screen Awards
2021; 10th Canadian Screen Awards	Elle-Máijá Tailfeathers	Night Raiders	
2021; 10th Canadian Screen Awards	Aviva Armour-Ostroff	Lune	
2021; 10th Canadian Screen Awards	Alana Hawley Purvis	Range Roads	
2021; 10th Canadian Screen Awards	Aliya Kanani	Scarborough	
2021; 10th Canadian Screen Awards	Julia Sarah Stone	Come True	

== See also ==
- Prix Iris for Best Actress
