= Meatballs III: Summer Job =

1987 film by George Mendeluk

- Theatrical release poster by Drew Struzan
- Directed by: George Mendeluk
- Written by: George Mendeluk; Bradley Kesden; Michael Paseornek; Len Blum; Dan Goldberg; Janis Allen; Harold Ramis
- Produced by: Don Carmody; John Dunning; André Link
- Starring: Sally Kellerman; Patrick Dempsey; Al Waxman; Isabelle Mejias
- Cinematography: Peter Benison
- Edited by: Debra Karen
- Music by: Paul Zaza
- Production companies: Dalco Productions, Inc. Cinepix
- Distributed by: The Movie Store
- Release date: February 21, 1987
- Running time: 96 minutes
- Countries: Canada; United States
- Language: English
- Budget: $5.2 million
- Box office: $2.1 million

Meatballs III: Summer Job is a 1987 comedy film and the third installment in the Meatballs film series. It is the first of the series to be rated R. Whereas Meatballs Part II was unconnected to the first movie, this film follows an adult Rudy Gerner, one of the main characters from Meatballs, now working a summer job for an angry boss named Mean Gene. Unlike the first two movies, this one is not set at summer camp, but rather at a nearby marina.

== Plot ==
When porn star, Roxy Doujor, is denied entrance into the afterlife, she is given one last chance to help some poor soul on Earth. She finds Rudy Gerner working at a summer river resort. Roxy is given a task to help Rudy lose his virginity in order to be allowed into the afterlife.

== Cast ==
- Patrick Dempsey as Rudy Gerner
- Sally Kellerman as Roxy Doujor
- George Buza as Gene "Mean Gene"
- Shannon Tweed as The Love Goddess
- Isabelle Mejias as Wendy
- Maury Chaykin as Huey, River Rat Leader
- Caroline Rhea as (uncredited) Beach Girl #4 (her debut role)
- Mark Blutman as Andy
