= Laszlo George =

Hungarian-born Canadian cinematographer

Laszlo Gyuriko (May 30, 1931 - June 7, 2021), known professionally as Laszlo George, was a Hungarian-born Canadian cinematographer. He was most noted as a two-time Genie Award nominee for Best Cinematography, receiving nominations at the 1st Genie Awards in 1980 for Running and at the 6th Genie Awards in 1985 for Draw!.

== Biography ==
Born in Budapest and raised in Bozsok, he studied cinematography at the Hungarian Academy of Film and graduated in 1954. He left the country during the Hungarian Revolution of 1956, first moving to England to take English courses at the University of Oxford before moving to Canada in 1957.

In Canada he began his career as a news cameraman for CBC Television, and later joined TDF Film Productions as a director of television commercials. In 1967, he and his wife Ildiko launched their own commercial photography and cinematography boutique, and George worked principally in commercial film and television afterward.

He was also co-director of Silent Sky, a 1977 IMAX short documentary film about aviation. The film was a Canadian Film Award nominee for Best Theatrical Short Film at the 28th Canadian Film Awards.

Over the course of his career, he also received a Gemini Award nomination for Best Photography in a Dramatic Program or Series at the 14th Gemini Awards in 1999 for Scandalous Me: The Jacqueline Susann Story, and an American Society of Cinematographers nomination for Outstanding Achievement in Cinematography in Motion Picture, Limited Series, or Pilot Made for Television in 1996 for the television film Zoya.

He received lifetime achievement awards from the Canadian Society of Cinematographers in 1995, and from the Hungarian Society of Cinematographers in 2019.
