= 1984 in Canadian television =

This is a list of Canadian television-related events from 1984.

== Events ==
Date	Event
March 21	5th Genie Awards.
September 1	New American and Canadian channels launch in Canada, They include CNN, A&E, The Nashville Network, TLC, MuchMusic and TSN. Initially these channels were scrambled. MuchMusic was unscrambled in 1988, followed by TSN in 1989 and the rest in 1992.
September 4	Live coverage of the 1984 election airs on all the main networks.
December 5	Juno Awards of 1984.

=== Debuts ===
Show	Station	Premiere Date
Video Hits	CBC Television	October 1
Danger Bay	CBC Television	October 18
Global Playhouse	Global	September

=== Ending this year ===
Show	Station	Cancelled
Second City Television	Movie Central	July 17
The Frantics	CBC Television	July 17
Take 30	CBC Television	Unknown
The Joke's on Us	Global	Unknown

== Births ==
- July 19 – Andrea Libman, actress, voice actress and singer
- September 22 – Laura Vandervoort, actress
- October 27 – Emilie Ullerup, actress

== Television shows ==
=== 1950s ===
- Country Canada (1954–2007)
- The Friendly Giant (1958–1985)
- Hockey Night in Canada (1952–present)
- The National (1954–present)
- Front Page Challenge (1957–1995)
- Wayne and Shuster Show (1958–1989)

=== 1960s ===
- CTV National News (1961–present)
- Land and Sea (1964–present)
- Man Alive (1967–2000)
- Mr. Dressup (1967–1996)
- The Nature of Things (1960–present, scientific documentary series)
- Question Period (1967–present, news program)
- Reach for the Top (1961–1985)
- The Tommy Hunter Show (1965–1992)
- W-FIVE (1966–present, newsmagazine program)

=== 1970s ===
- The Beachcombers (1972–1990)
- Canada AM (1972–present, news program)
- City Lights (1973–1989)
- Definition (1974–1989)
- the fifth estate (1975–present, newsmagazine program)
- The Littlest Hobo (1979–1985)
- Live It Up! (1978–1990)
- The Mad Dash (1978–1985)
- Marketplace (1972–present, newsmagazine program)
- Polka Dot Door (1971-1993)
- Smith & Smith (1979–1985)
- You Can't Do That on Television (1979–1990)
- 100 Huntley Street (1977–present, religious program)

=== 1980s ===
- Bizarre (1980–1985)
- Bumper Stumpers (1987–1990)
- Guess What (1983–1987)
- The Edison Twins (1982–1986)
- Fraggle Rock (1983–1987)
- Hangin' In (1981–1987)
- The Journal (1982–1992)
- Lorne Greene's New Wilderness (1982–1987)
- Seeing Things (1981–1987)
- Snow Job (1983–1985)
- Switchback (1981–1990)
- Today's Special (1982–1987)
- Thrill of a Lifetime (1981–1987)

== TV movies ==
- A Change of Heart
- Chautauqua Girl
- Hide & Seek
- I Love a Man in Uniform
- Kate Morris, Vice President
- Rough Justice
- Slim Obsession

== Television stations ==
=== Debuts ===
Date	Market	Station	Channel	Affiliation	Notes/References
January 9	Calgary, Alberta	CIAN-TV	13	Independent	
Unknown	Carleton, Quebec	CIVK-TV	15	Télé-Québec	

== See also ==
- 1984 in Canada
- List of Canadian films of 1984
