= Jane Hallaren =

American film and television actress (born 1940)

Jane Hallaren is an American retired film and television actress. She is best known for her role in the film Lianna.

== Filmography ==
- 1997 : Home Improvement (television series)
- 1994 : L.A. Law (television series)
- 1992-1993 : Civil Wars (television series)
- 1992 : Melrose Place (television series)
- 1991 : My Girl : Randall
- 1989 : Lost Angels : Grace Willig
- 1989 : Moonlighting (television series) : Lydia Budroe Kraft
- 1988 : A Night in the Life of Jimmy Reardon : Faye Reardon
- 1988 : Matlock (television series) : Laura Frazier
- 1987 : Santa Barbara (television series) :
- 1985 : Stark: Margaret
- 1985 : Simon & Simon (television series) : Mrs. Glass
- 1984 : The Paper Chase (television series) :
- 1984 : Unfaithfully Yours: Janet
- 1983 : Rita Hayworth: The Love Goddess : Virginia Van Upp
- 1983 : Lianna : Ruth
- 1981 : Body Heat : Stella
- 1981 : Modern Romance: Ellen
- 1980 : Hero at Large: Gloria Preston
- 1988 : A Night in the Life of Jimmy Reardon: Faye Reardon
