= Fanfreluche =

Canadian children's television show

Fanfreluche is a French-language Canadian children's television show made in Quebec by Radio-Canada. The show made its debut in 1968 and ran for forty-six episodes until 1971. It starred Fanfreluche, a living doll (played by Kim Yaroshevskaya) who retold fairy tales and legends to the viewers. When the story went a way that displeased her, she would physically enter it to "fix" the ending which sometimes put her in a perilous situation.

From the character in this show, prominent Montreal businessman and Thoroughbred horse breeder Jean-Louis Lévesque named one of his fillies Fanfreluche. Believed to have used the name to please a grandchild, Levesque's filly became a Canadian and United States champion racehorse in 1970.

The theme song was composed by Herbert Ruff.

== History ==
In 1957, Fanfreluche made her first appearance as a character of the children show Le grenier aux images. Following this, Fanfreluche became a recurring character in the children show La boîte à surprise (1956-1967). Yaroshevskaya, originally from Moscow, based her character on stories from russian poet Pushkin and the ballet Coppélia.

Between 1968 and 1971, Kim Yaroshevskaya wrote and played as the titular character in every episode.

Radio-Canada ran regular reruns from the 1968 to 1982, with partial reruns in the 90's.

== See also ==
- List of Quebec television series
- Television of Quebec
- Culture of Quebec
