= Yves Laferrière =

Canadian composer and actor (1943–2020)

- Born: 1943
- Died: December 11, 2020 (aged 76–77); Montreal, Quebec, Canada
- Occupations: Composer; Actor

Yves Laferrière (1943 – December 11, 2020) was a Canadian musician and composer. He was a two-time Genie Award winner, for Best Original Song at the 6th Genie Awards in 1985 for "Touch Me", which he cowrote with Paule Baillargeon and Marjolène Morin for the film A Woman in Transit (La Femme de l'hôtel), and for Best Original Score at the 11th Genie Awards in 1990 for Jesus of Montreal (Jésus de Montréal).

== Filmography ==
=== Composer ===
- The Red Kitchen (La Cuisine rouge) - 1980
- La Phonie furieuse - 1982
- Lucien Brouillard - 1983
- Just a Game (Rien qu'un jeu) - 1983
- A Woman in Transit (La Femme de l'hôtel) - 1984
- Like a Heartbreak (C'est comme une peine d'amour) - 1985
- Sonia - 1986
- Transit - 1986
- Le Chemin de Damas - 1988
- Jesus of Montreal (Jésus de Montréal) - 1989
- White Is the Night (Blanche est la nuit) - 1989
- Impasse de la vignette - 1990
- Babylone - 1990
- Moody Beach - 1990
- Solo - 1991
- Montreal Stories (Montréal vu par...) - 1991
- Kitty Cats - 1991
- Le Complexe d'Édith - 1991
- Between the Solitudes - 1992
- The Sex of the Stars (Le sexe des étoiles) - 1993
- Bandes-hommages 100 ans de cinéma - 1996
- Poverty and Other Delights (Joyeux Calvaire) - 1996
- The Secret Laughter of Women - 1999
- Claude Jutra, portrait sur film - 2002
- Plain Truth - 2004

=== Actor ===
- Le Complexe d'Édith (Short, 1991)
