= Tobias A. Schliessler =

German cinematographer

- Born: 5 November 1958 (age 67); Baden-Baden, Germany
- Occupation: Cinematographer
- Parent(s): Martin Schliessler; Anemone Schliessler

Tobias A. Schliessler (born 5 November 1958) is a German cinematographer.

== Life and career ==
Schliessler was born in Baden-Baden, Germany, to documentary filmmaker and artist Martin Schliessler (1929–2008) and editor Anemone Schliessler (née Heim). His brother, Jochen, is a documentary filmmaker, and his sister, Tina, a film producer, photographer, and painter who works principally but not exclusively with her husband Charles Wilkinson.

Schiessler grew up in Baden-Baden. In 1979, he moved to Vancouver, British Columbia, Canada and later studied film at the Simon Fraser University. After his graduation as a cinematographer, he started to work on documentary films and advertisement spots. In the late 1980s, he started to work for Canadian television productions. In 1997, he moved to Los Angeles, where he worked on the production of movies like Dreamgirls, Hancock and Battleship. He often works with the directors Bill Condon and Peter Berg. He is a member of the American Society of Cinematographers.

== Filmography ==
=== Feature film ===
Year	Title	Director	Notes
1984	My Kind of Town	Charles Wilkinson	With David Geddes
1989	The Top of His Head	Peter Mettler	With Peter Mettler
1989	Quarantine	Charles Wilkinson	
1990	Angel Square	Anne Wheeler	
1991	Chaindance	Allan A. Goldstein	
1991	South of Wawa	Robert Boyd	
1992	North of Pittsburgh	Richard Martin	
1994	Bulletproof Heart	Mark Malone	
1994	Max	Charles Wilkinson	Also credited as producer
1995	Candyman: Farewell to the Flesh	Bill Condon	First collaboration with Condon
1997	Free Willy 3: The Rescue	Sam Pillsbury	
1998	Hoods	Mark Malone	
2000	The Guilty	Anthony Waller	
2000	Bait	Antoine Fuqua	
2003	The Rundown	Peter Berg	First collaboration with Berg
2004	Friday Night Lights	Peter Berg	
2006	Dreamgirls	Bill Condon	
2008	Hancock	Peter Berg	
2009	The Taking of Pelham 123	Tony Scott	
2012	Battleship	Peter Berg	
2013	The Fifth Estate	Bill Condon	
2013	Lone Survivor	Peter Berg	
2015	Mr. Holmes	Bill Condon	
2016	Patriots Day	Peter Berg	
2017	Beauty and the Beast	Bill Condon	
2018	A Wrinkle in Time	Ava DuVernay	
2019	The Good Liar	Bill Condon	
2020	Spenser Confidential	Peter Berg	
2020	Ma Rainey's Black Bottom	George C. Wolfe	
2021	Palmer	Fisher Stevens	
2021	Come from Away	Christopher Ashley	
2022	The Adam Project	Shawn Levy	
2023	Rustin	George C. Wolfe	
2025	Kiss of the Spider Woman	Bill Condon	

=== Television ===
Year	Title	Director	Notes
1989	The Ray Bradbury Theater	David Brandes; Allan Kroeker; Randy Bradshaw	3 episodes
1990	Mom P.I.	Brad Turner	Episode "When Sally Met Bernie"
1990	Neon Rider	Neill Fearnley	Episode "Confessions"
1992	The Heights		9 episodes
2010	The Big C	Bill Condon	Episode "Pilot"
2015	Ballers	Peter Berg	Episode "Pilot"
2023	All the Light We Cannot See	Shawn Levy	Miniseries

=== Music video ===
Year	Title	Artist(s)	Director
2003	"Addicted"	Enrique Iglesias	Peter Berg
2014	"Maps"	Maroon 5	Peter Berg
