= Raoul Wallenberg: Buried Alive =

- Directed by: David Harel
- Written by: David Harel; Peter Lauterman
- Produced by: Wayne Arron; David Harel
- Starring: Pierre Berton
- Cinematography: David J. Yorke
- Edited by: Roushell Goldstein
- Music by: Tony Kosinec; Jack Lenz
- Production company: Wayne Arron Films
- Release date: 1983
- Running time: 78 minutes
- Country: Canada
- Language: English

Raoul Wallenberg: Buried Alive is a Canadian documentary film, directed by David Harel and released in 1983. A profile of Swedish diplomat Raoul Wallenberg, the film covered his role in saving the lives of Jewish refugees from the Holocaust, as well as exploring the evidence that he may still have been alive in a Soviet gulag as late as the early 1980s.

The film was narrated by Pierre Berton. It had a brief theatrical run, but was distributed primarily on television, airing on PBS in 1984 and on CBC Television in 1985.

The film won the Genie Award for Best Feature Length Documentary at the 6th Genie Awards.
