= Jon Minnis =

Canadian animator

Jon Minnis is a Canadian animator. He is most noted for his 1984 short film Charade, which was the winner of the Academy Award for Best Animated Short Film at the 57th Academy Awards, and the Genie Award for Best Theatrical Short Film at the 6th Genie Awards.
