= Home Fires (Canadian TV series) =

Canadian television drama series

- Starring: Gerard Parkes; Kim Yaroshevskaya; Wendy Crewson; Peter Spence; Jeff Wincott
- Country of origin: Canada
- No. of seasons: 4
- No. of episodes: 31

Production
- Running time: 60 minutes

Original release
- Network: CBC
- Release: November 9, 1980 – November 17, 1983

Home Fires is a Canadian television drama series that aired on CBC Television from 1980 to 1983. It was a family saga set in Toronto during World War II, and took its name from the expression "keep the home fires burning".

Created and written by Jim Purdy and Peter Such, the series centred on the Lowes, a family in Toronto. Patriarch Arthur Lowe (Gerard Parkes) was a doctor who ran a family medicine clinic in a working class downtown neighbourhood with nurse Marge (Sheila Moore), and was married to housewife Hannah (Kim Yaroshevskaya), a Jewish immigrant from Poland.

As the series progressed, storylines increasingly focused on Arthur and Hannah's children Terry (Wendy Crewson) and Sidney (Peter Spence) and nephew Jakob (Gil Yaron). Terry married her boyfriend Graeme (Jeff Wincott) shortly before he was shipped off to serve in the war, where he was killed at Dieppe; she then served in the Canadian Women's Army Corps before taking a job as a welder in an aircraft factory, where she became a labour union organizer. She entered a new relationship with Bruce McLeod (Booth Savage), a war correspondent, and ultimately decided to attend medical school to become a doctor in the show's final season. Sidney, who was too young at the start of the series to register for military service, resented being unable to serve but signed up for the Royal Canadian Air Force when he reached enlistment age. He was captured as a prisoner of war, but eventually returned to Toronto with a new British war bride. Jakob was Hannah's nephew, a Polish refugee who had come to live with his aunt and uncle in Canada to escape the rising tide of European anti-Semitism in the leadup to the war; initially a supporting character, he became much more prominent after Sidney's enlistment.

Crewson won an ACTRA Award as Best Continuing Television Performance at the 13th ACTRA Awards in 1984 for the show's final season.
