= Tony Morelli =

Canadian kickboxer and stuntman (1956–2015)

- Born: Antonio Giovanni Morelli; May 16, 1956 (age 70); Lytton, British Columbia, Canada
- Died: April 19, 2015 (aged 58); Langley, British Columbia, Canada
- Nationality: Canadian
- Height: 5 ft 10 in (1.78 m)
- Division: Light Heavyweight; Cruiserweight
- Style: Kickboxing
- Years active: 1979–1983

Antonio Giovanni Morelli (May 16, 1956 – April 19, 2015) was a Canadian professional kickboxer, stuntman, and actor.

== Biography ==
Morelli was born in Lytton, British Columbia on May 16, 1956, and raised in Chilliwack and Abbotsford.

Originally trained as a boxer, he won a gold medal in the Light Heavyweight category at the 1979 Western Canada Summer Games in Saskatoon.

=== Kickboxing ===
Morelli became the World Kickboxing Association (WKA) Super Light Heavyweight Champion, after defeating Travis Everett on April 19, 1980, in Vancouver, British Columbia.

On March 4, 1982, he defeated debuting Maurice Smith by decision. Fourteen months later, he lost the title to Smith in the seventh round by KO.

Morelli was a member of the WKA World Team, along with Benny Urquidez, Don Wilson, and Graciela Casillas.

Morelli was the subject of a 1980 documentary, The Kickboxers, directed by Gary Bush.

=== Film career ===
Morelli's stunt career began in 1983, and took part in various film and television projects, including Walls, Airwolf, Legends of the Fall, The 6th Day, Smallville, X-Men: The Last Stand, 2012, The Twilight Saga: New Moon, Rise of the Planet of the Apes, The Cabin in the Woods, Arrow and Godzilla. He was a primary stunt coordinator on the television series Wiseguy and The X-Files.

He played a henchman in the Sammo Hung-starring Hong Kong action comedy Paper Marriage (1988), which was filmed in Calgary.

== Death ==
A longtime resident of Langley, British Columbia, Morelli died suddenly on April 19, 2015, aged 58.
