= Drifting Snow =

2021 Canadian drama film

- Directed by: Ryan Noth
- Written by: Ryan Noth
- Produced by: Ryan Noth; Tess Girard
- Starring: Sonja Smits; Jonas Bonnetta
- Cinematography: Tess Girard
- Edited by: Andres Landau
- Music by: Jonas Bonnetta
- Production company: Fifth Town Films
- Distributed by: Game Theory Films
- Release date: March 2, 2021 (KCFF)
- Running time: 74 minutes
- Country: Canada
- Language: English

Drifting Snow is a 2021 Canadian drama film, written, produced, and directed by Ryan Noth.

The film centres on Joanne (Sonja Smits) and Chris (Jonas Bonnetta), two strangers brought together by a car accident on a back road in Ontario's Prince Edward County; although neither is injured, Chris's car is damaged enough to not be drivable, so Joanne drives him back to town in hers. Each is grieving a recent loss following the death of Joanne's husband John (Colin Mochrie) and Chris's mother; Chris has also recently been diagnosed with a progressive eye disease which may eventually threaten his career as a cinematographer. As the two talk during the drive, their shared experiences of loss and uncertainty about the future help each to find new perspective on their lives.

The cast also includes Linda Goranson, Jess Salgueiro, Patricia Phillips, Chris Locke and Rachel Bonnetta.

== Production ==
The film was shot in 2019, and had been planned to debut at the Kingston Canadian Film Festival in 2020, but was not screened at that time due to the cancellation of the festival in light of the COVID-19 pandemic in Canada. It instead had its debut at the online edition of the festival in 2021, before being commercially released to video on demand platforms in May.

== Critical response ==
Chris Knight of the National Post rated the film 3.5 stars out of 5, writing that it felt like a pandemic film even though it had been shot prior to COVID. He singled out Tess Girard's cinematography as the true highlight of the film, comparing it favourably to the work of Denis Côté.

Amil Niazi of The Globe and Mail concurred that Girard's cinematography was the standout part of the film, writing that "Girard's long, plaintive scenes and lingering shots of the county lend a brutal beauty and tension to the film’s otherwise slower-moving parts. Girard uses her skillful eye to portray the harshness of the land but also uplifts its curves, lending them a sense of comfort for those who choose to stay and make a home in its seemingly unforgiving shapes." Niazi praised both Smits's and Bonnetta's performances, and concluded that the film "is actually a perfect distillation of the pandemic experience. From the daily weight of navigating grief in solitude to the desires of many to leave the frenetic pace of city life for something more still and intentional, Drifting Snow is almost a tribute to what the past year has been for so many of us, fumbling our way toward something less lonely and waiting for the snow to pass."

== Awards ==
Girard received a Canadian Screen Award nomination for Best Cinematography at the 10th Canadian Screen Awards in 2022.
