= Reno and the Doc =

- Directed by: Charles Dennis
- Written by: Charles Dennis; Damian Lee
- Produced by: David Mitchell; Sean Ryerson
- Starring: Kenneth Welsh; Linda Griffiths; Henry Ramer
- Cinematography: Ludek Bogner
- Edited by: James Lahti; Mairin Wilkinson
- Music by: Betty Lazebnik
- Production company: Rose & Ruby Productions
- Distributed by: First Choice
- Release date: June 4, 1984
- Running time: 89 minutes
- Country: Canada
- Language: English

Reno and the Doc is a Canadian comedy film, released in 1984. Written and directed by Charles Dennis, the film was produced Rose & Ruby Productions for First Choice.

== Plot ==
The film stars Kenneth Welsh as Reno, a reclusive ski bum who teams up with Doc (Henry Ramer), a con man, to form a ski racing team. Quite unexpectedly, however, they also find themselves forming a love triangle with Savannah Gates (Linda Griffiths), a female sports reporter.

== Awards ==
The film garnered four Genie Award nominations at the 6th Genie Awards in 1985:

- Best Actor: Kenneth Welsh
- Best Actress: Linda Griffiths
- Best Original Song: "A Little Piece of Forever" (Charles Dennis and Betty Lazebnik)
- Best Original Score: Betty Lazebnik
