= That's My Baby! (1984 film) =

- Directed by: John Bradshaw; Edie Yolles
- Written by: John Bradshaw; Edie Yolles
- Produced by: Edie Yolles
- Starring: Timothy Webber; Sonja Smits; Lenore Zann; Matt Craven; Joann McIntyre
- Cinematography: W.W. Reeve
- Edited by: John Bradshaw; Stephen Withrow; Edie Yolles
- Music by: Eric N. Robertson
- Production company: Gemini Film Productions
- Distributed by: Troma Entertainment
- Release date: November 30, 1984
- Running time: 97 minutes
- Country: Canada
- Language: English

That's My Baby! is a 1984 Canadian comedy film directed by John Bradshaw and Edie Yolles. It was distributed for a brief time by Troma Entertainment.

The film follows a Toronto couple, Lewis (Timothy Webber) and Suzanne (Sonja Smits). Lewis takes care of the house and works part-time, while Suzanne works full-time as a television producer. Lewis decides he wants a child, but Suzanne worries that it might interfere with her career.

The cast also includes Joann McIntyre, Lenore Zann, Derek McGrath, Daniel Buccos, Kate Trotter, Matt Craven, Les Carlson, Jack Mather, Frank Moore, Peter MacNeill, Meredith Winning, Caroline Sturk, Norma Edwards, Michael Wong, Evan Meister and Kathryn Winning in supporting roles.

== Production and distribution ==
The film's production was first announced in 1980 as the narrative feature debut of Yolles and Bradshaw, following the success of their student documentary film Inner City Angels. Yolles described the film as centred on "the male identity in an increasingly feminist world and the place children have in our lives when we're all looking for self-expression."

It was screened at the Carlton Theatre in Toronto in November 1984 in a bid to make the film eligible for Genie Award consideration, but with the producers explicitly asking for the film not to be reviewed at that time as it did not yet have a commercial distribution deal in place and even its final commercial release print wasn't finished yet. Jay Scott of The Globe and Mail characterized this release strategy as essentially "an attempt to conform to the letter of Academy of Canadian Cinema law while subverting its spirit."

The film ultimately went into limited commercial distribution in 1988.

== Critical response ==
Geoff Pevere panned the film in the Toronto Star, writing that "biology has let Lewis down. He and Suzanne seem like the victims of some cruel gender-joke, trapped in bodies that thwart their deepest desires. Maybe if they were in one of those monthly Hollywood switcheroo comedies - then he could happily bear children, and she could resume her ruthless corporate climb unhindered by either guilt or morning sickness. They could call it He's Having A Baby. Unfortunately, the movie they're stuck in is this one, which means they've got to work things out without benefit of potions, plot contrivances, John Hughes or magic rays."

At the time of the original Carlton run, Scott wrote that the film "turns out to be a mediocre but honorable and not uninteresting Canadian film - nicely directed, awkwardly written, competently performed - on the subject of male motherhood: the man (Timothy Webber) wants a baby, the woman (Sonja Smits) does not. That's My Baby is a run-of-the-mill movie that nonetheless deserves better than to be treated by its ingenuous producers as something that should be kept away from the press. More important is the principle of the thing: the Genie awards deserve better than to be treated by producers as a publicity tool."

When the film received its 1988 release, Chris Dafoe wrote that "the film sets out with the best of intentions. He (Timothy Webber) is a sensitive guy - emotionally retarded, perhaps, but still sensitive - who has trouble finding meaning in life. She (Sonja Smits) is a tough, beautiful TV producer on her way up. He wants a kid. She doesn't. And biology being what it is, they both can't have their way. They argue and split up. After the split, he searches for love in all the wrong places, trying to find a compatible mate in these sexually confused times. The problem is, of course, that while the filmmakers would like us to see this quest as his attempt to come to grips with a changing world, the lingering image is of a man in search of a brood mare."

== Awards ==
The film received two Genie Award nominations at the 6th Genie Awards in 1985, for Best Actress (Smits) and Best Sound Editing (Michel B. Bordeleau).
