= Latitude 55° =

- Directed by: John Juliani
- Written by: John Juliani; Sharon Riis
- Produced by: Donna Wong-Juliani; Harold Lee Tichenor
- Starring: Andrée Pelletier; August Schellenberg
- Cinematography: Robert Ennis
- Edited by: Doris Dyck; Barbara Evans
- Music by: Victor Davies
- Distributed by: International Spectrafilm
- Release date: November 26, 1982
- Running time: 102 minutes
- Country: Canada
- Language: English
- Budget: $ 800,000

Latitude 55° is a 1982 Canadian drama/adventure film.

== Plot ==
Wanda Woodsworth (Andrée Pelletier), a field worker for the Department of Culture, is on her way home to the city after a winter assignment in the northern part of Alberta. Her car breaks down on the deserted highway and as the weather worsens she finds herself stranded in the middle of a blizzard. Her initial calm gives way to anxiety and eventually to panic as she desperately tries to stay awake and alive. At the height of the blizzard, Wanda is rescued by a local potato farmer, Joseph Przysiezny (August Schellenberg), who carries her to a dilapidated shack nearby. For two days and two nights, while waiting for the blizzard to pass, two people stalk each other restlessly, inexorably, with humour and passion, in a painfully revealing series of confrontations that runs the gamut from mistrust and terror to physical intimacy and almost religious ecstasy.

== Recognition ==
- 1983
  - Genie Award for Best Achievement in Art Direction – Richard Hudolin
  - Genie Award for Best Achievement in Costume Design – Wendy Partridge
  - Genie Award for Best Performance by an Actor in a Leading Role – August Schellenberg
  - Genie Award for Best Performance by an Actress in a Leading Role – Andrée Pelletier
  - Genie Award for Best Original Screenplay – John Juliani, Sharon Riis
