= Winston Rekert =

Canadian actor

- Winston Rekert in 1986
- Born: 1948 or 1949; Vancouver, British Columbia, Canada
- Died: September 14, 2012 (aged 63); Vancouver, British Columbia, Canada
- Occupation: Actor
- Years active: 1973–2012

Winston Houghton Rekert (June 10, 1949 – September 14, 2012) was a Canadian actor. He was best known for starring in the television series Adderly and Neon Rider.

== Career ==
A Vancouver native, Rekert started acting at age 12, appearing in an amateur production of Amahl and the Night Visitors. After high school, Rekert spent a year working in a logging camp, then took a year off to try acting. Rekert subsequently joined the Arts Club Theatre Company and in 1973 he landed his first television role on the comedy-drama The Beachcombers.

In 1985 Rekert played the role of Detective Langevin in the American film Agnes of God. In the same year, he received a Genie Award nomination for Best Actor at the 6th Genie Awards for his performance in the film Walls.

From 1986 to 1988 Rekert starred as the lead character in the Canadian television series Adderly, a comedy drama that was a spoof of the spy genre. In 1987 Rekert won a Gemini Award for Best Performance by a Lead Actor in a Continuing Dramatic Role for his work on the series.

Following Adderly's cancellation, Rekert's childhood friend, Danny Virtue, pitched him an idea for a television series that eventually became Neon Rider. The series ran from 1990 to 1995 and starred Rekert as Michael Terry, a therapist who ran a ranch for troubled adolescents. Rekert also worked on the series as a writer, director and producer. Through the show Rekert became involved with a variety of youth groups and was named the national spokesman for Youth at Risk.

In 2003 Rekert won his second Gemini Award for Best Performance by an Actor in a Guest Role in a Dramatic Series for his appearance on the television series Blue Murder.

Over the course of his career, Rekert made guest appearances on many Canadian and American television series filmed in Vancouver, including Cold Squad, Supernatural, Stargate SG-1 and Battlestar Galactica.

In April 2012 the Union of B.C. Performers awarded Rekert with the Sam Payne Lifetime Achievement Award—an annual award that "recognizes professional performers displaying humanity, artistic integrity and encouragement of new talent."

== Death ==
Rekert died on September 14, 2012, at the age of 63 after a three-year battle with cancer.

== Filmography ==
Year	Title	Role	Notes
1977	Prairie Landscapes		
1980	Suzanne	Nicky Callaghan	
1980	Coming Out Alive	Cab Driver	
1981	Heartaches	Marcello	
1981	Your Ticket Is No Longer Valid	Antonio Montoya	
1981	The Littlest Hobo	James	Episode: "Photo Finish"
1982	Love	John	(segment "The Black Cat in the Black Mouse Socks")
1983	Dead Wrong	Sean Phelan	
1984	Walls	Danny Baker	
1985	Agnes of God	Detective Langevin	
1985	The Blue Man	Paul Sharpe	
1985–1986	Star Wars: Droids	Mungo Baobab	5 episodes
1986	Toby McTeague	Tom McTeague	
1986	High Stakes	Dorian Kruger	
1986–1988	Adderly	V. H. Adderly	44 episodes
1990–1995	Neon Rider	Michael Terry	64 episodes
1998	Stargate SG-1	Cordesh	Episode: "The Tok'ra" parts 1 & 2
1999	Psi Factor	Reed Callum	
2000	The Last Stop	Carl	
2004	Savage Island	Eliah Savage	
2004	Eve's Christmas	William Simon	
2006	Honeymoon with Mom	Larry	
2006	Trapped Ashes	Dr. Larry	Segment: "The Girl with Golden Breasts"
2006	Battlestar Galactica (2004 TV series)	Priest	Episodes: "Lay Down Your Burdens: Part 2", "Collaborators"
2007	Supernatural	Jonah Greely	Episode: "Roadkill"
