= My Kind of Town (film) =

- Directed by: Charles Wilkinson
- Written by: Charles Wilkinson
- Produced by: Cal Shumiatcher
- Starring: Peter Smith; Tina Schliessler; John Cooper
- Cinematography: David Geddes; Tobias Schliessler
- Edited by: Frank Irvine
- Music by: Charles Wilkinson
- Production company: Milltown Pictures
- Release date: December 17, 1984
- Running time: 78 minutes
- Country: Canada
- Language: English

My Kind of Town is a Canadian drama film, directed by Charles Wilkinson and released in 1984. The film was made concurrently with The Little Town That Did, Wilkinson's National Film Board of Canada documentary about the murals of Chemainus, British Columbia, and starred mainly non-professional actors who were simultaneously working as production crew on the documentary.

The film stars Peter Smith as Peter Hall, a young man in Chemainus who aspires to escape to the big city of Vancouver, but gradually becomes convinced to stay in Chemainus when he meets and falls in love with Astrid Heim (Tina Schliessler), a recent immigrant from Germany, and finds success in his summer job helping the town's mayor (John Cooper) promote the summer festival. The cast also includes Roy Everts, Frank Irvine, Michael Marks, Haida Paul, Ileana Paul and Michael Paul.

The film received two Genie Award nominations at the 6th Genie Awards in 1985, for Best Supporting Actor (Cooper) and Best Editing (Irvine).
