= Martin Schliessler =

German adventurer, cinematographer and sculptor

Martin Schliessler (1929–2008) was a German adventurer, cinematographer and sculptor.

== Life ==
Martin Schliessler was born in 1929 in Mannheim, the son of artists Gertrud and Otto Schliessler.

He was involved in the production of more than 200 nature and expedition documentaries. He was second cinematographer for the documentary Im Schatten des Karakorum (1955), which was shown at the 5th Berlin International Film Festival and there was awarded with the Große Bronzene Plakette (Dokumentar- und Kulturfilm).

He later often worked in Alaska, where he filmed pipeline installations, Inuit, bush pilots and gold diggers. In 1967 he and Ray Genet tried to climb Denali but had to cancel their trip shortly before reaching the mountain top. In 1974 Schliessler survived a plane crash and filmed the rescue efforts during the next days.

In 1956 he married Anemone Heim, daughter of Rosel Heim (co-founder of Sans Souci Cosmetics). Martin is the father of equestrian Barbara (Schliessler) Marks (born 1958), cinematographer Tobias A. Schliessler (born 1959), film producer, painter and photographer Tina Schliessler (born 1961) and documentary filmmaker Jochen Schliessler (born 1964).

Martin authored a number of books including Auf verwehten Spuren, Beruf: Abenteurer, Amerikas Indianische Seele.

He moved with his family to Vancouver, British Columbia, Canada in 1979. There he worked as a filmmaker and sculptor. He died after a long illness in 2008.
