= Neon Rider =

- Genre: Drama
- Created by: Winston Rekert; Danny Virtue
- Directed by: Bruce Pittman
- Theme music composer: Terry Frewer
- Country of origin: Canada
- Original language: English
- No. of seasons: 5
- No. of episodes: 64

Production
- Executive producers: Winston Rekert; Michael MacMillan; Danny Virtue
- Producers: Justis Greene; Mary Kahn
- Production locations: Vancouver, British Columbia, Canada; Mission, British Columbia, Canada
- Editor: Frank Irvine
- Running time: ca 50 minutes
- Production company: Virtue/Rekert Productions

Original release
- Network: CTV (1990-1992); YTV (1992-1995)
- Release: September 15, 1990 – November 1, 1995

Neon Rider is a Canadian drama television series which aired between 1990 and 1995. Created by Winston Rekert and Danny Virtue, the show was about the title character, a psychologist named Michael Terry (Rekert) who, after writing a successful book on adolescent psychology, purchases his childhood friend's family ranch just outside of Mission, British Columbia to open a therapeutic residential treatment program for troubled and abused teens. The series was filmed and set in Vancouver, and British Columbia's Lower Mainland and Fraser Valley.

Other cast members included Samuel Sarkar, William S. Taylor, Peter Williams, Suzanne Errett-Balcom, Antoinette Bower, Barbara Tyson, Alex Bruhanski, Philip Granger and Jim Byrnes.

Neon Rider was produced by Alliance Atlantis and broadcast on the CTV Television Network on Saturdays at 10 PM then moved to 8 PM in 1991. CTV cancelled the series in 1992 after which original episodes continued to air on the youth-oriented cable network YTV and in syndication.

The series was also popular in Gibraltar where it aired on GBC TV.

== Cast ==
- Winston Rekert as Michael Terry
- Samuel Sarkar as Vic
- Barbara Tyson as Eleanor James (seasons 2–5)
- William S. Taylor as John Philip Reid III
- Alex Bruhanski as C.C. Dechardon (season 1)
- Antoinette Bower as Fox Devlin (seasons 1–3)
- Peter Williams as Pin
- Suzanne Errett-Balcom as Rachel Woods (seasons 1–5)
- Philip Granger as Walt (seasons 2–5)
- Jim Byrnes as Kevin (seasons 2–5)
- Barbara Russell as Mrs. Farrell (season 1)

== Episodes ==
=== Season 1 (1990) ===
No. overall	No. in series	Title	Directed by	Written by	Original release date
1	1	"Dude"	Stuart Margolin	Stuart Margolin	TBA
2	2	"Nowhere to Run"	George Bloomfield	Aubrey Solomon	September 15, 1990
3	3	"Hardcase"	Brad Turner	Aubrey Solomon	1990
4	4	"Devil's Child"	George Bloomfield	Marlene Matthews	1990
5	5	"One Step"	Charles Lazer	Neill Fearnley	1990
6	6	"Clay Pigeon"	René Bonnière	Richard Oleksiak	1990
7	7	"All's Fair"	George Mendeluk	Jorge Montesi & Peter Haynes	1990
8	8	"Playing With Fire"	Bruce Pittman	David Eames	1990
9	9	"The Mighty Quinn"	Neill Fearnley	Christian Bruyère	1990
10	10	"Starting Over"	Bruce Pittman	Aubrey Solomon	1990
11	11	"Guardian Angel"	Michael Robison	Jerome McCann	1990
12	12	"You Can Run"	Allan King	Story by : R.A. Lyons; Teleplay by : Cash Edwards	1990
13	13	"Confessions"	Neill Fearnley	Winston Rekert, Danny Virtue, Carl Binder	1990
14	14	"Under Pressure"	Michael Berry	Aubrey Solomon	1990
15	15	"Suspicions"	Stuart Gillard	Aubrey Solomon	1990
16	16	"John Doe"	Joseph L. Scanlan	Brad Wright	1990
17	17	"Model Student"	Neill Fearnley	Carl Binder	1990
18	18	"Father and Son"	Bruce Pittman	Christian Bruyère	1990
19	19	"High Wire"	Neill Fearnley	Brad Wright	1990
20	20	"Blood Feud"	Bruce Pittman	Aubrey Solomon	1990
21	21	"Over the Line"	George Bloomfield	Sally Drake, Thomas Y. Drake	1990
22	22	"Hacker"	Vic Sarin	Story by : R.A. Lyons; Teleplay by : Brad Wright	1990
23	23	"Backwater"	René Bonnière	Brad Wright	1990
24	24	"Vengeance"	Scott Hylands	Aubrey Solomon	1990
25	25	"Running Man"	Bruce Pittman	Bill Thumm	1990

=== Season 2 (1991) ===
No. overall	No. in series	Title	Directed by	Written by	Original release date
26	1	"A Face in the Crowd"	Joseph L. Scanlan	Carl Binder	1991
27	2	"1117"	Neill Fearnley	Brad Wright	1991
28	3	"Loyalties"	Joseph L. Scanlan	Brad Wright	1991
29	4	"The Twelfth Step"	Bruce Pittman	Carl Binder	1991
30	5	"Secrets"	Peter D. Marshall	Rick Drew	1991
31	6	"Providence"	Bruce Pittman	Carl Binder	1991
32	7	"Men of Principle"	Neill Fearnley	Hart Hanson	1991
33	8	"Bread and Water"	Bruce Pittman	Brad Wright	1991
34	9	"Twist in the Wind"	Brad Turner	Alan Di Fiore	1991
35	10	"Black Moon Rising"	Bruce Pittman	Jana Veverka	1991
36	11	"Before I Sleep"	Alan Simmonds	Brad Wright	1991
37	12	"Phoenix"	Ken Jubenvill	Carl Binder	1991
38	13	"Nowhere Fast"	Neill Fearnley	Carl Binder	1991
39	14	"Parent's Day"	George Bloomfield	Brad Wright	1991

=== Season 3 (1992) ===
No. overall	No. in series	Title	Directed by	Written by	Original release date
40	1	"A Perfect 10"	George Bloomfield	Carl Binder	1992
41	2	"Saint Walt"	Bruce Pittman	Brad Wright	1992
42	3	"Straight Home"	David Winning	Brad Wright	1992
43	4	"Colour Line"	Bruce Pittman	Carl Binder	1992
44	5	"Night of the Living Ed"	George Bloomfield	Brad Wright	1992
45	6	"Labour Day"	Bruce Pittman	Carl Binder	1992
46	7	"Point Blank"	George Bloomfield	Alan Di Fiore	1992
47	8	"Daniel"	Bruce Pittman	Brad Wright	1992
48	9	"On the Line"	Mick MacKay	Winston Rekert, Danny Virtue, Rick Drew	1992
49	10	"The Good, The Bad and Eleanor"	Winston Rekert	Winston Rekert, Carl Binder	1992
50	11	"Brothers"	Winston Rekert	Brad Wright	1992

=== Season 4 (1993) ===
No. overall	No. in series	Title	Directed by	Written by	Original release date
51	1	"Extreme Prejudice"	Nicholas Kendall	Brad Wright	1993
52	2	"Live and Let Go"	Mick MacKay	Laura Doyle, Brad Wright	1993
53	3	"Safe at Home"	Peter D. Marshall	Alison Lea Bingeman	1993
54	4	"Walking Tall"	Danny Virtue	Richard Oleksiak	1993
55	5	"The Best Man"	Bruce Pittman	Chris Haddock	1993

=== Season 5 (1995) ===
No. overall	No. in series	Title	Directed by	Written by	Original release date
56	1	"Moving On: Part 1"	Winston Rekert	Brad Wright	1994
57	2	"Moving On: Part 2"	Winston Rekert	Brad Wright	1994
58	3	"St. Vincent"	Peter D. Marshall	Victor Nicolle	1994
59	4	"The Secret Life of Garret Tuggle"	Bruce Pittman	Carl Binder	1994
60	5	"Little Con"	Bruce Pittman	Charles Lazer	1994
61	6	"Cowboys and Indians"	Danny Virtue	Carmen Thibault, Jeremy R. Wright	1994
62	7	"Fathers"	Bruce Pittman	Brad Wright, Laura Doyle	1994
63	8	"Where the Buffalo Roam"	Mick MacKay	Carl Binder	1994
64	9	"What's Up, Doc?"	Crawford Hawkins	Scott Renyard	1994

== See also ==
- Higher Ground, a similarly themed series.
- Outriders, a similarly themed series.
