= Andrée Pelletier =

Canadian actress

- Born: August 24, 1951 (age 74); Montreal, Quebec, Canada
- Occupation: Actress
- Known for: The Handyman (L'Homme à tout faire), Latitude 55°, Walls

Andrée Pelletier (born August 24, 1951) is a Canadian actress, screenwriter and film director. As an actress, she is a five-time Canadian Film Award and Genie Award nominee, receiving nominations for Best Actress at the 29th Canadian Film Awards in 1978 for her performance as Marie-Anne Gaboury in the film Marie-Anne, at the 2nd Genie Awards in 1981 for The Handyman (L'Homme à tout faire), at the 4th Genie Awards in 1983 for Latitude 55° and at the 6th Genie Awards in 1985 for Walls, and a Best Supporting Actress nominee at the 8th Genie Awards in 1987 for Bach and Broccoli (Bach et Bottine).

She later turned to screenwriting, including the films The Peanut Butter Solution, Nénette and Karmina, and directed the films Anchor Zone and Voodoo Dolls.

Born in Montreal, Quebec, she is the daughter of Gérard Pelletier, a former journalist and diplomat.
