= Peter Spence (actor) =

Canadian film and television actor

Peter Spence is a Canadian film and television actor. He is most noted for his roles as the title character in the 1986 television film The Truth About Alex, one of the first television films ever to address the subject of gay youth, and as Jessie in the 1984 film Unfinished Business, for which he received a Genie Award nomination for Best Supporting Actor at the 6th Genie Awards in 1985.

== Career ==
Spence's first role was in the CBC Television drama series Home Fires, as Sidney Lowe; during this time, he also appeared in episodes of Hangin' In and The Littlest Hobo. After Home Fires wrapped production in 1983, Spence enrolled at York University, but quickly dropped out after being cast in the films Unfinished Business and The Bay Boy. After completing those films, he moved to New York City to complete his acting education at Circle in the Square Theatre School, sharing an apartment at that time with his Bay Boy castmates Kiefer Sutherland and Leah Pinsent; in 1985, Spence appeared in the film Crazy Moon, playing Sutherland's brother for the second time.

Following The Truth About Alex, Spence moved back to Toronto. He has continued to act, primarily in television films and series guest roles. He appeared most recently in the 2016 film The History of Love. Spence was also a story consultant for the 2019 film Tito.

== Filmography ==
=== Film ===
Year	Title	Role	Notes
1984	Unfinished Business	Jessie 'Fixit'	
1984	The Bay Boy	Joe Campbell	
1985	Blue Line	Myles	
1987	Crazy Moon	Cleveland	
1998	Clutch	Larry	
2008	One Week	Doctor	
2015	Crimson Peak	Manager	
2016	The History of Love	Bernard Moritz	
2017	Cardinals	Jonah Pastekh	Also story editor

=== Television ===
Year	Title	Role	Notes
1981, 1982	Hangin' In	Jeff / Brian	2 episodes
1983	The Littlest Hobo	David Leonard	Episode: "Second Sight"
1984	A Matter of Sex	Young Man	Television film
1985	The Undergrads	Steve Holmes	Television film
1986	Loose Ends	Adam	Television film
1986	The Magical World of Disney	Jeff	Episode: "Young Again"
1986	The Edison Twins	Peter Bridges	Episode: "The Initiation"
1986	The Truth About Alex	Alex Prager	Television film
1987, 1988	Alfred Hitchcock Presents	Jerry / Andrew / Duke	2 episodes
1988	The Campbells	Alf Whitaker	Episode: "Of Fathers and Sons"
1989	T. and T.	David	Episode: "Family Honour"
1990	The Last Best Year	Jack	Television film
1990	Street Legal	Jeffrey Chernoff	Episode: "Softsell"
1990	Scales of Justice	Charles Jordan	Episode #1.12
1992	Secret Service	Agent Phillips	Episode: "The Banker and the Belle/Car Wars"
1993	Beyond Reality	Robert Wallice	Episode: "Let's Play House"
1995	Choices of the Heart	Driver at Port	Television film
1995	TekWar	Peter	Episode: "Zero Tolerance"
2000	Harlan County War	Mike McKenna	Television film
2001	Blue Murder	Drew Milroy	Episode: "Homeless"
2003	Control Factor	Trevor Constantine	Television film
2003	Odyssey 5	David Hovic	Episode: "Rage"
2004	Urban Myth Chillers	Mark	Episode: "À malin, malin et demi"
2008	The Summit	Phil	2 episodes
2014	The Strain	Richard	Episode: "The Box"
2015	Hannibal	Mr. Lombard	Episode: "The Great Red Dragon"
2015	The Expanse	Mormon Elder	Episode: "CQB"
