= Walls (1984 film) =

- Directed by: Tom Shandel
- Written by: Christian Bruyère
- Produced by: Tom Shandel; Christian Bruyère
- Starring: Winston Rekert; Andrée Pelletier
- Cinematography: Doug McKay
- Edited by: Barbara Evans
- Music by: J. Douglas Dodd; Michael Oczko
- Production company: Jerico Films
- Release date: September 9, 1984 (TIFF)
- Running time: 100 minutes
- Country: Canada
- Language: English

Walls is a 1984 Canadian drama film directed by Tom Shandel. Based on the theatrical play by Christian Bruyère, the film is a dramatization of the British Columbia Penitentiary hostage incident of 1975.

The film stars Winston Rekert as Danny Baker, the fictionalized version of prisoner Andy Bruce, and Andrée Pelletier as Joan Tremblay, the fictionalized version of social worker and hostage Mary Steinhauser. The cast also included Elizabeth Leigh-Milne, Lloyd Berry, Anthony Holland, Perry Long, John Lord, Tony Morelli, Alan Scarfe, Howard Storey, Dale Wilson and John Wright.

The film premiered at the 1984 Toronto International Film Festival. It was criticized by real prison guards and prisoners, with the guards claiming that it was too sympathetic to prisoners, while prisoners and prison reform advocates stated that it was too sympathetic to the guards and insufficiently graphic about real prison conditions.

The film received four Genie Award nominations at the 6th Genie Awards in 1985, for Best Actor (Rekert), Best Actress (Pelletier), Best Supporting Actress (Leigh-Milne) and Best Original Score (J. Douglas Dodd and Michael Oczko).
