= Unfinished Business (1984 film) =

- Film poster
- Directed by: Don Owen
- Written by: Don Owen
- Produced by: Annette Cohen; Don Owen; Don Haig; Robert Verrall
- Starring: Peter Kastner; Julie Biggs; Isabelle Mejias; Peter Spence
- Cinematography: Douglas Kiefer
- Edited by: Peter Dale; David Nicholson
- Music by: Patricia Cullen; Norman Orenstein
- Production companies: Zebra Films; Canadian Broadcasting Corporation
- Release date: September 1984 (TIFF)
- Running time: 99 minutes
- Country: Canada
- Language: English

Unfinished Business is a 1984 Canadian drama film directed by Don Owen. It is a sequel to Owen's influential 1964 film Nobody Waved Good-bye.

The film stars Peter Kastner and Julie Biggs as Peter and Julie, both reprising their lead roles from the original film. Having married and settled down into adulthood following Julie's pregnancy in the original film, they have since divorced but are now coping with the emerging rebelliousness of their now 17-year-old daughter Izzy (Isabelle Mejias). The cast also includes Peter Spence, Chuck Shamata, Melleny Brown and Ann-Marie MacDonald. CBC journalist Ann Medina played a reporter.

== Cast ==
- Isabelle Mejias as Isabelle Marks
- Peter Spence as Jessie 'Fixit'
- Leslie Toth as Matthew
- Julie Biggs as Julie Marks
- Jane Foster as Jackie
- Melleny Melody as Larissa / Larry (credited as Melleny Brown)
- Chuck Shamata as Carl
- Peter Kastner as Peter Marks
- Ann-Marie MacDonald as Paula
- Ann Medina as TV Announcer / Newscaster
- Marc Gomes as Cecil

== Nominations ==
The film garnered five Genie Award nominations at the 6th Genie Awards in 1985:

- Best Actress: Isabelle Mejias
- Best Supporting Actor: Peter Spence
- Best Director: Don Owen
- Best Screenplay: Don Owen
- Best Cinematography: Douglas Kiefer
