= Xavier Petermann =

Canadian actor

- Born: Xavier Norman Petermann
- Occupations: actor, video game developer
- Known for: Mario

Xavier Norman Petermann is a Canadian former child actor from Quebec, who garnered a Genie Award nomination for Best Actor at the 6th Genie Awards for his performance as an autistic child in the film Mario. The film was his first-ever acting role.

Petermann continued to act in Quebec films and television series until the early 1990s. He has since worked as a musician and as a multimedia and video game developer.
