= The Terrapin (film) =

1984 Canadian film

- French: La Terrapène
- Directed by: Michel Bouchard
- Written by: Michel Bouchard
- Based on: "The Terrapin" by Patricia Highsmith
- Produced by: Michel Bouchard; Jacques Pettigrew
- Starring: Julien Davy; Alexandra Stewart
- Cinematography: Guy Dufaux
- Edited by: André Corriveau
- Production company: Cine Groupe
- Release date: 1984
- Running time: 24 minutes
- Country: Canada
- Language: French

The Terrapin (French: La Terrapène) is a Canadian short drama film, directed by Michel Bouchard and released in 1984. Adapted from Patricia Highsmith's short story "The Terrapin", the film centres on Victor (Julien Davy), a young boy whose fraught relationship with his mother (Alexandra Stewart) comes to a head after he bonds with the terrapin she has brought home to cook for supper.

The film received a Genie Award nomination for Best Theatrical Short Film at the 6th Genie Awards in 1985.
