= The Terrapin =

Short story by Patricia Highsmith

"The Terrapin" is a short story by Patricia Highsmith. Based on the difficult relationship Highsmith had with her own mother, the story revolves around a young boy, Victor, who is emotionally abused by his difficult, haughty mother, an illustrator of children's books.

== Plot ==
The story begins with several instances of Victor's mother infantilizing him by requesting him to recite the days of the week, wear shorts with stockings, and give his opinion on her children's book illustrations. The story reveals that Victor's father, although claimed to be wealthy, is out of the picture, yet Victor is unfazed by this circumstance.

After tuning out his mother's ramblings on her new illustration, his mom realizes his disregard, taunts him for acting sound and mocks the shorts she forces him to wear, which is a sore subject for Victor. He starts crying, and then his mom informs him that her friend, Mrs. Badzerkian, is coming over for tea, and he should recite one of his poems for her. When he says he will recite "Bed in Summer", the first poem that comes to mind, she slaps him because he has already recited that poem and shouts when defending his answer.

Later, when entering the kitchen, Victor notices the live terrapin of the title, a small tortoise trying to turn over off its back. Victor immediately starts fantasizing about showing the turtle off to other kids who bullied him. However, his mother informs him that the turtle is for a stew she is preparing. He still takes the Terrapin out and plays with it, ultimately growing his attachment and leading him to vow not to eat the terrapin.

After Mrs. Badzerkian arrives, Victor's mom recounts Victor's playing with the terrapin and describes him as childish. Victor interjects to defend himself before subsiding to his mother's excusing of him. After Mrs. Badzerkian leaves, Victor's mom requests that he get heavy cream. On his way back, he encounters another child, Frank, and promises to show the terrapin to him the following morning.

When he returns, he realizes that his mother is preparing the stew that night, and he won't get to show off the tortoise. Before he can persuade his mother to let him show off the terrapin, it suffers an agonizing death when she drops it into the boiling pan. She then begins to cut and prepare the dead animal while Victor watches from afar. This event pushes Victor over the edge — he believes he heard it scream — and during the night, he butchers his mother with a kitchen knife, only stopping because of tiredness. The story ends while doctors are examining him in a psychiatric hospital.

== Background ==
Many believe that the short story was inspired by Highsmith's relationship with her mother, Mary Highsmith. The mother in the short story shares several similarities with Highsmith's mother, including...

- Both Victor’s mother and Highsmith's mother are unsuccessful commercial artists.
- Victor’s mother repeats the phrase “psychologically sick”, and Highsmith's mother described her, in several writings, as "sick".
- Victor and Highsmith's mother are divorced and have no relationship with the father of their children.
- Highsmith depicted both her mother and Victor's mother as erratic and critical.

== In popular culture ==
The short story is mentioned in the 2023 film Perfect Days.

The Terrapin (La Terrapène), a 1984 short film by Michel Bouchard, was adapted from the story.

== Awards and honors ==
- 1963 : Nominee, Edgar Allan Poe Award, Best Short Story, Mystery Writers of America (in Ellery Queen's Mystery Magazine)
- 1963 : Special Award, Mystery Writers of America
