= Sonatine (1984 film) =

1984 film

- Directed by: Micheline Lanctôt
- Written by: Micheline Lanctôt
- Produced by: Pierre Gendron
- Starring: Marcia Pilote; Pascale Bussières; Pierre Fauteux; Kliment Denchev; Pierre Girard
- Cinematography: Guy Dufaux
- Edited by: Louise Surprenant
- Music by: François Lanctôt
- Production companies: Corporation Image M & M
- Distributed by: Les Films René Malo
- Release date: 24 February 1984
- Running time: 91 minutes
- Country: Canada
- Language: French

Sonatine is a 1984 Canadian drama film written and directed by Micheline Lanctôt. The film was selected as the Canadian entry for the Best Foreign Language Film at the 57th Academy Awards, but was not accepted as a nominee.

The film centres on two young girls, Chantal (Pascale Bussières) and Louisette (Marcia Pilote), who become disillusioned with the world of adults and plan a suicide pact. Lanctôt structured the film as a triptych, with one segment devoted to each of the two girls as an individual, going through the experiences that cause them to lose faith in humanity, before they plan the suicide pact in the third segment. Lanctôt admitted that she had written the screenplay at a time when she was very depressed.

The film premiered in February 1984 before opening commercially in March.

== Cast ==
- Marcia Pilote as Louisette
- Yves Jacques as The Subway Station Janitor
- Pierre Giard
- Pierre Fauteux as Fernand
- Kliment Dentchev as Bulgarian seaman
- Pascale Bussières as Chantal

== Awards ==
The film received five Genie Award nominations at the 6th Genie Awards in 1985, for Best Director (Lanctôt), Best Actress (Bussières), Best Screenplay (Lanctôt), Best Costume Design (Hélène Schneider), Best Original Score (François Lanctôt). Micheline Lanctôt won the award for Best Director.

The film won the now-defunct Silver Lion for Best First Film (1983-1987) at the 41st Venice International Film Festival.

== See also ==
- List of submissions to the 57th Academy Awards for Best Foreign Language Film
- List of Canadian submissions for the Academy Award for Best Foreign Language Film
