= Charade (1984 film) =

1984 film directed by Jon Minnis

- Directed by: Jon Minnis
- Written by: Jon Minnis
- Produced by: Jon Minnis; Michael Mills
- Starring: Jon Minnis
- Production company: Sheridan College
- Distributed by: Michael Mills Productions
- Release date: April 10, 1984
- Running time: 5 minutes
- Country: Canada
- Language: English

Charade is a 1984 Canadian animated film directed by Jon Minnis. The film won the Academy Award for Best Animated Short Film at the 57th Academy Awards, and the Genie Award for Best Theatrical Short Film at the 6th Genie Awards.

The film was animated by Minnis with Pantone markers on paper, during a single three-month summer term at Sheridan College.

== Plot ==
In front of a witless audience, a talented but unlucky gentleman competes in a game of charades against a savant who puts no effort to it and yet the audience still gets his right.

== Cast ==
- Jon Minnis as Father, Beatrice, etc. (voice)

== See also ==
- Minimalist film
- 1984 in film
- A Milhouse Divided
