= Productivity and Performance by Alex K. =

1984 film

- Directed by: Tony Currie
- Written by: Tony Currie
- Produced by: Nicolas Stiliadis; Syd Cappe
- Starring: Bruce Pirrie; Michael Ferguson; Peter McBurnie; Pandora Richardson; Carl Zittrer
- Cinematography: Nicolas Stiliadis
- Edited by: Stephen Withrow
- Music by: Drew King
- Release date: 1984
- Running time: 10 minutes
- Country: Canada
- Language: English

Productivity and Performance by Alex K. is a Canadian short educational comedy film, directed by Tony Currie and released in 1984. The film stars Bruce Pirrie as Alex K., a lazy young man who is trying to learn how to develop better personal habits so he can become more successful.

The cast also includes Michael Ferguson, Peter McBurnie, Pandora Richardson and Carl Zittrer.

The film received a Genie Award nomination for Best Theatrical Short Film at the 6th Genie Awards in 1985.
