= Linda Griffiths =

Canadian actress (1953–2014)

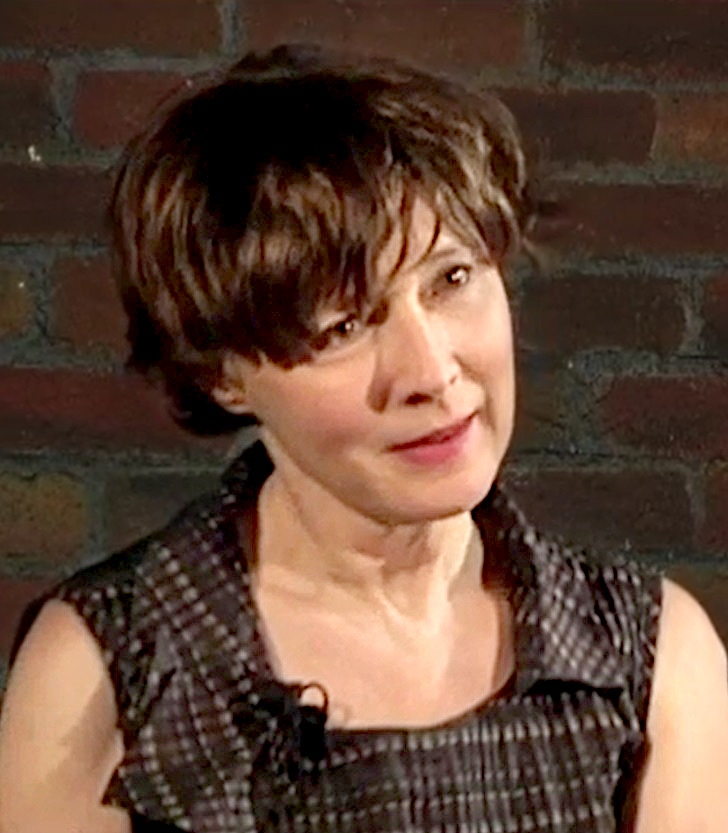
- Griffiths in 2013
- Born: Linda Pauline Griffiths; 7 October 1953; Montreal, Quebec, Canada
- Died: 21 September 2014 (aged 60); Toronto, Ontario, Canada
- Education: Dawson College; National Theatre School; McGill University
- Occupations: Actress, playwright
- Years active: 1980–2014

Linda Pauline Griffiths (7 October 1953 – 21 September 2014) was a Canadian actress and playwright best known for writing and starring in the one woman play Maggie and Pierre, in which she portrayed both Pierre Trudeau and his then-estranged wife, Margaret. Among her cinematic work, she is best known for her acclaimed, starring role in Lianna.

== Early life ==
Griffiths was born in Montreal, Quebec. Following her studies at St. Thomas High School in Pointe Claire, she attended Dawson College, then The National Theatre School (for one year), and finally McGill University. She is best known for her 1980 one-woman play Maggie and Pierre, cowritten with Paul Thompson, in which she played both Pierre Trudeau and Margaret Trudeau as well as a fictional journalist named Henry. The play toured across Canada, including at the Royal Alexandra Theatre in Toronto, and had an off-Broadway run in New York City.

== Career ==
Best known as a stage actor, she also did television and film work, including episodes of the TV series Empire, Inc., Friday the 13th: The Series, Street Legal, Katts and Dog, Beyond Reality, Due South, Traders and Twice in a Lifetime. She had the starring role in John Sayles' 1983 film Lianna, and also appeared in the films The Execution of Raymond Graham, Samuel Lount, Reno and the Doc, Overdrawn at the Memory Bank and Mama's Going to Buy You a Mockingbird. She was nominated for the Genie Award for Best Actress at the 6th Genie Awards in 1985 for her performance in Reno and the Doc, and the Gemini Award for Actress in a Dramatic Program or Mini-Series at the 2nd Gemini Awards in 1987 for The Marriage Bed.

In 1994 she starred alongside Alan Williams in The Darling Family, Alan Zweig's film adaptation of her own theatrical play.

In 1997, she formed her own company Duchess Productions, which produced a tour of Alien Creature, as well as developing and associate-producing The Duchess, Alien Creature, Chronic, and her last play, Age of Arousal.

As co-author of The Book of Jessica (written with native author and activist Maria Campbell), Griffiths and Campbell created a new hybrid of theatre book, one which included the play Jessica, as well as the personal and political process of its creation. Griffiths has also created collective work (Paper Wheat, Les Maudits Anglais) and published short stories (The Speed Christmas, Spiral Woman).

Sheer Nerve, a collection of seven of her plays, was published in 1999.

== Death ==
Griffiths died of breast cancer on the morning of 21 September 2014 at Toronto's Bridgepoint Health centre.

While public records gave her birth year as 1956, CBC quoted her friend and caretaker, Layne Coleman, as saying her actual birthdate was 7 October 1953.

== Awards ==
Griffiths garnered five Dora Mavor Moore Awards through her career, winning Outstanding New Play four times for Maggie and Pierre (1980), O.D. on Paradise (1983), Jessica (1986) and Alien Creature (2000), and Outstanding Performance in a Leading Role for Maggie and Pierre (1980). She was also a two-time winner of the Floyd S. Chalmers Canadian Play Award for Jessica and Alien Creature, and a two-time nominee for the Governor General's Award for English-language drama for The Darling Family (1991) and Alien Creature.

She was nominated for a Genie Award for Best Actress in 1984 for Charles Dennis's Reno and the Doc.

== Plays ==
- Maggie & Pierre (1980; with Paul Thompson)
- O.D. on Paradise (1982)
- Jessica (1986; with Maria Campbell)
- The Darling Family (1991)
- A Game of Inches (1991)
- Brother André's Heart (1992)
- Spiral Women and the Dirty Theatre (1993)
- The Duchess a.k.a. Wallis Simpson (1997)
- Alien Creature: A Visitation from Gwendolyn MacEwen (1999)
- Chronic (2003)
- Baby Finger (2005)
- Age of Arousal (2007)
- The Last Dog of War (2010)
- Heaven Above, Heaven Below (2013)
