= Isabelle Mejias =

Canadian actress

Isabelle Mejias (born November 4, 1961) is a Canadian actress. She is most noted for her performance in the film Unfinished Business, for which she received a Genie Award nomination for Best Actress at the 6th Genie Awards in 1985.

== Career ==
Originally from Montreal, Quebec, Mejias had her first film role in the 1980 film Girls. She then appeared in The Lucky Star, Le Roi des cons and Julie Darling prior to 1984, when she appeared in both Unfinished Business and The Bay Boy. For Cinema Canada magazine, critic John Harkness wrote of her performance in Unfinished Business that "If this were a country with any sort of rational production/distribution/publicity system, a performance like this would mean that she would immediately be talked about in Hollywood - Mejias has star quality like you wouldn't believe."

She subsequently starred in the films Blue Line, Meatballs III: Summer Job, Higher Education, State Park, The Midday Sun and Scanners II: The New Order. She also starred in the television miniseries Echoes in the Darkness, and had supporting or guest appearances in the television series Philip Marlowe, Private Eye, The Edison Twins, Night Heat, Street Legal and Danger Bay. She received a Gemini Award nomination for Best Guest Performance in a Television Series at the 3rd Gemini Awards for Danger Bay.

Her final known acting role was in the 1996 television film Psychic Detectives, under her married name Isabelle Jamieson.

== Filmography ==
=== Film ===
Year	Title	Role	Notes
1980	Girls	Betty Darquier	
1980	The Lucky Star	Marijke	
1981	Le roi des cons	Suzanne	
1983	Julie Darling	Julie	
1984	Unfinished Business	Isabelle Marks	
1984	The Bay Boy	Mary McNeil	
1985	Blue Line	Nicole	
1986	Meatballs III: Summer Job	Wendy	
1988	Higher Education	Carrie Hanson	
1988	State Park	Marsha	
1988	Fall from Innocence	Marsa Cummings	
1989	The Midday Sun	Maggie Cameron	
1991	Scanners II: The New Order	Alice Leonardo	
1992	Hammer Down	Gina Angelo	
1994	Final Round	Lee	

=== Television ===
Year	Title	Role	Notes
1984	Special People	Julie	Television film
1986	Philip Marlowe, Private Eye	Monique	Episode: "Blackmailers Don't Shoot"
1986	The Edison Twins	Brenda	Episode: "Smile for the Camera"
1987	Alfred Hitchcock Presents	Kelly Jenkins	Episode: "Tragedy Tonight"
1987	Echoes in the Darkness	Shelly	2 episodes
1987	Danger Bay	Suzette Poitier	Episode: "It's a Jungle in There"
1987, 1988	Night Heat	Simone / Valerie	2 episodes
1987, 1992	Street Legal	Anna Briso / Kim Morrow	2 episodes
1989	Day One	Mrs. Trowbridge	Television film
1989	War of the Worlds	Sherry	Episode: "So Shall Ye Reap"
1989	Friday the 13th: The Series	Blair Gerard	Episode: "The Shaman's Apprentice"
1990	T. and T.	Ally	Episode: "Suspect"
1992	Dangerous Curves	Suzanne Blake / Victoria Frost	Episode: "Obsession"
1996	Psychic Detectives	Cadabra	Television film
