= Mario (1984 film) =

- Directed by: Jean Beaudin
- Written by: Jean Beaudin; Arlette Dion; Jacques Paris
- Based on: La Sablière by Claude Jasmin
- Produced by: Jean Beaudin; Jacques Bobet; Hélène Verrier
- Starring: Xavier Petermann; Francis Reddy; Nathalie Chalifour; Jacques Godin
- Cinematography: Pierre Mignot; Thomas Vámos
- Edited by: Werner Nold
- Music by: François Dompierre
- Production company: National Film Board of Canada
- Distributed by: Cinema International Canada
- Release date: August 22, 1984
- Running time: 98 minutes
- Country: Canada
- Language: French
- Budget: $ 2,000,000 (estimated)

Mario is a 1984 Quebec drama film, set in the Magdalen Islands, directed by Jean Beaudin and produced by the National Film Board of Canada.

== Plot ==
Mario (Petermann) is a 10-year-old mute autistic boy. He has an 18-year-old brother named Simon (Reddy), whom he admires greatly. One day, Simon becomes involved with a woman and, as a result, their relationship becomes strained. Mario finds himself without his brother and his parents who are always watching over their island during the tourist season.

== Cast ==
- Xavier Petermann as Mario (as Xavier Norman Petermann)
- Francis Reddy as Simon
- Nathalie Chalifour as Hélène
- Jacques Godin as father
- Muriel Dutil as mother
- Claire Pimparé as social worker
- Christian Breton as receptionist
- Marcel Sabourin as therapist

== Production ==
The film, based on Claude Jasmin's La Sablière, went over budget.

== Recognition ==
- 1985 Genie Award for Best Achievement in Cinematography – Won (Pierre Mignot)
- 1985 Genie Award for Best Achievement in Overall Sound – Won (Bruce Nyznik, Richard Besse, Hans Peter Strobl)
- 1985 Genie Award for Best Achievement in Music – Original Score – Won (François Dompierre)
- 1985 Genie Award for Best Achievement in Art Direction/Production Design – Nominated (Denis Boucher)
- 1985 Genie Award for Best Achievement in Sound Editing – Nominated (David Evans, Wayne Griffin)
- 1985 Genie Award for Best Motion Picture – Nominated (Jean Beaudin, Hélène Verrier)
- 1985 Genie Award for Best Performance by an Actor in a Leading Role – Nominated (Xavier Petermann)

== See also ==
- List of autistic fictional characters

== Works cited ==
- Evans, Gary (1991). In the National Interest: A Chronicle of the National Film Board of Canada from 1949 to 1989. University of Toronto Press. ISBN 0802027849.
