= Sonja Smits =

Canadian actress (born 1954)

- Born: September 8, 1958 (age 68); Ottawa Valley, Ontario, Canada
- Years active: 1978–present

Sonja Smits (born September 8, 1958) is a Canadian actress. She was nominated for two Genie Awards for Videodrome (1983) and That's My Baby! (1984). On television, she starred in Street Legal and Traders.

== Early life and education ==
Smits was born in the Ottawa Valley, Ontario, Canada. She went to Bell High School in Bells Corners, she also attended Woodroffe High School and South Carleton High School in Richmond, a village outside Ottawa. She studied acting at Ryerson Polytechnic Institute until she was invited to join the Centre Stage theatre company in London, Ontario.

== Career ==
Television

Besides her starring roles in Street Legal (1987–1992) and Traders (1996-2000), Smits played a main role as Megan Redner on The Eleventh Hour (2002–2005) and a recurring role as Cynthia Hodge on Odyssey 5 (2002–2003). Smits' guest roles in television series, including Falcon Crest (1984), Airwolf (1987), Counterstrike (1993), The Outer Limits (1995) and the miniseries The Best Laid Plans (2014).

Film

On the big-screen, Smits played Bianca O'Blivion in David Cronenberg's science fiction body horror film Videodrome (1983) and starred in the 2021 drama Drifting Snow. She portrayed Mona Louise Parsons in a Heritage Minutes short documentary film by Historica Canada. In 2025, Smits portrayed the Terran Proctor in Star Trek: Section 31.

== Awards and nominations ==
Smits has been nominated for five Gemini Awards, winning in 1988, and two Genie Awards. She has also received the Toronto Women in Film and Television (TWIFT) Outstanding Achievement Award, and the ACTRA Toronto Award of Excellence.

== Personal life ==
Smits is married to Atlantis Films co-founder Seaton McLean with whom she has two children. They live in the Rosedale neighbourhood of Toronto and are the owners of the Closson Chase winery in Prince Edward County. They also own a farm close to the winery.

In 2009, Smits was elected president of the board of directors of the Harbourfront Centre.

== Filmography ==
=== Film ===
Sonja Smits film credits
Year	Title	Role	Notes	Ref.
1978	Tyler	Sharon		
1981	The Pit	Mrs. Lynde		
1983	Videodrome	Bianca O'Blivion	Nominated — Genie Award for Best Supporting Actress	
1984	That's My Baby!	Suzanne	Nominated — Genie Award for Best Actress	
2003	Owning Mahowny	Dana Selkirk		
2003	How to Deal	Carol Warsher		
2004	A Different Loyalty	Fay Tolland		
2006	One Way	Linda Birk		
2021	Drifting Snow	Joanne		
2022	Better Days	Kate	Nominated — ACTRA Award for Outstanding Performance – Gender Non-conforming or Female	
2025	Star Trek: Section 31	Terran Proctor		
2026	I Come Home	Maggie		

=== Television ===
Sonja Smits television credits
Year	Title	Role	Notes	Ref.
1980	War Brides	Lisa	TV movie Nominated — ACTRA Award	
1984	Falcon Crest	Lydia Boulanger	Episode: "Suitable for Framing"	
1984–1985	The Hitchhiker	Nina Russell / Susan Carter	Episodes: "Face to Face", "Murderous Feelings"	
1985	The Fall Guy	Jessica Beaumont	Episode: "Her Bodyguard"	
1985	Command 5	Chris Winslow	TV movie	
1986	Loose Ends	Carla	TV movie	
1986	Danger Bay	Unknown	1 episode	
1987	Airwolf	Alexandria Rostov	Episode: "Stavograd: Parts 1 & 2"	
1987–1992	Street Legal	Carrington 'Carrie' Barr	Main role, 83 episodes Gemini Award for Best Actress in a Continuing Leading Dramatic Role (1988); Nominated — Gemini Award for Best Actress in a Continuing Leading Dramatic Role (1993)	
1988	The Ray Bradbury Theater	Mary	Episode: "The Fruit at the Bottom of the Bowl"	
1993	The Diviners	Morag	TV movie Nominated — Gemini Award for Best Performance by an Actress in a Leading Role in a Dramatic Program or Mini-Series	
1993	Counterstrike	Julia Devane	Episode: "Betrayed"	
1994	Spenser: Pale Kings and Princes	Carolyn Rogers	TV movie	
1994	TekWar	Kate Cardigan	TV movie	
1994	TekLords	Kate Cardigan	TV movie	
1995	The Outer Limits	Dr. Anne Crain	Episode: "White Light Fever"	
1995	Nothing Sacred	Unknown	TV movie	
1996–2000	Traders	Sally Ross	Main role, 83 episodes Nominated — Gemini Award for Best Actress in a Continuing Leading Dramatic Role (1999-2000)	
1998	Dead Husbands	Sheila Feinstein	TV movie	
2001	Made in Canada	Angela Widstrom	Episode: "Teamwork"	
2001	Life with Judy Garland: Me and My Shadows	Kay Thompson	TV miniseries	
2002	Mom's on Strike	First Lady	TV movie	
2002–2003	Odyssey 5	Cynthia Hodge	Recurring role	
2002–2005	The Eleventh Hour	Megan Redner	Main role	
2003	The Atwood Stories	Mrs. Anderson	Episode: "The Man from Mars"	
2004	Siblings	Mom	TV movie	
2005	Heritage Minutes	Mona Louise Parsons	Episode: "Mona Parsons"	
2007–2008	Rent-a-Goalie	Texas	Episodes: "Texas", "Upstairs"	
2012	Cybergeddon	Amanda Jocelyn	Episodes: "Chapter 3", "Chapter 6"	
2012	Cybergeddon Zips	Amanda Jocelyn	Episode: "Amanda"	
2014	The Best Laid Plans	Diane Gagnon	TV miniseries	
2016	Flower Shop Mystery: Dearly Depotted	Glory Osbourne	TV movie	
2017	Ransom	Gwyneth Davenport	Episode: "The Artist"	
2017	American Gods	Laura's Mother	Episodes: "The Bone Orchard", "Git Gone", "A Murder of Gods"	
2017	Murdoch Mysteries	Belinda Carlyle	Episode: "Brackenreid Boudoir"	
2017	Save Me	Gloriana	Episode: "Code 5"	
2018	Mary Kills People	Estelle	Episode: "The Connection"	
2021	A Mother's Lie	Joyce	TV movie. AKA Hidden Family Secrets	
2022	Pretty Hard Cases	Judy Wazowski	9 episodes Nominated — ACTRA Award for Best Series Ensemble	
2024	Hudson and Rex	Minister Fulford	Episode: "Wag the Dog"	
