= Isaac Littlefeathers =

- Directed by: Les Rose
- Written by: Barry Pearson
- Produced by: William Johnston; Barry Pearson
- Starring: William Korbut; Lou Jacobi; Scott Hylands; Vincent Gale
- Cinematography: Ed Higginson
- Edited by: Mairin Wilkinson
- Music by: Paul Zaza
- Production company: Lauron International
- Distributed by: Canadian Broadcasting Corporation
- Release date: December 7, 1984
- Running time: 100 minutes
- Country: Canada
- Language: English

Isaac Littlefeathers is a Canadian drama film, directed by Les Rose and released in 1984. The film stars William Korbut as the titular Isaac Littlefeathers, a young Métis boy in Edmonton who is struggling to establish his identity, having been raised by Jewish shopkeeper Abe Kapp (Lou Jacobi) ever since being abandoned by his parents (Scott Hylands and Michelle Thrush) in childhood.

The film had been in development since 1976, but Rose was unable to secure funding for the film until CBC Television committed to broadcast it in 1985 as part of its expanded program of independent production. The film had a brief theatrical run in 1984 in advance of its television premiere.

The film received five Genie Award nominations at the 6th Genie Awards in 1985, for Best Cinematography (Ed Higginson), Best Costume Design (Wendy Partridge), Best Overall Sound (David Appleby, Christopher Tate, Don White and Garrell Clark), Best Sound Editing (Michael O'Farrell and Peter Thilaye) and Best Original Score (Paul Zaza).
