= The Bay Boy =

- Directed by: Daniel Petrie
- Written by: Daniel Petrie
- Produced by: Denis Héroux; John Kemeny
- Starring: Liv Ullmann; Kiefer Sutherland; Peter Donat
- Cinematography: Claude Agostini
- Edited by: Susan Shanks
- Music by: Claude Bolling
- Distributed by: Pan-Canadian (Canada); Orion Classics (US)
- Release dates: 6 September 1984 (TIFF); 15 February 1985 (United States)
- Running time: 100 minutes
- Countries: Canada; France
- Language: English
- Box office: $162,364 (US)

The Bay Boy is a 1984 Canadian drama film. It is a semi-autobiographical film based on director Daniel Petrie's experiences of growing up in Glace Bay, a mining town on Cape Breton Island, during the Great Depression. It features the screen debut of Kiefer Sutherland as the film's central character, alongside Liv Ullmann as his character's mother.

== Plot ==
On Cape Breton Island in 1937, 16-year-old Donald Campbell's mother wants him to continue his education after high school and become a priest, but Donald is more interested in girls. He is also frightened after a visiting priest attempts to molest him.

When not in school, Donald spends his time helping his father dig a bootleg pit; helps care for his older brother, Joe, who was the brightest boy in his grade until he got sick and was left disabled; and pursues Saxon Coldwell, one of two daughters of police Sergeant Coldwell and his recently deceased wife.

Donald witnesses Coldwell shoot and kill the Jewish couple who are his landlord and landlady. The chief of police is a relative, so Donald feels comfortable admitting that he saw the killing. Out of fear of Coldwell, he says did not see who did it. Coldwell subsequently lets Donald know he is aware that Donald did see him commit the murders. When Coldwell finds Donald visiting with Saxon's sister Dianna, he hits Donald with his belt and orders him out of the house. Coldwell begins to violently discipline Dianna, causing Donald to say he is going to the police chief to report that Coldwell is the murderer. After a short pursuit, Coldwell catches Donald and tries to kill him; nearby police intercede and arrest Coldwell, and his secrets are revealed.

In spite of his attraction to the Coldwell daughters, Donald eagerly loses his virginity to the sexually experienced Mary, the brightest girl in his class, who seduces him while they are studying. They agree to continue meeting for sex, but this does not lead to a lasting relationship. The Coldwell girls move away, and Donald sadly bids them farewell while preparing to leave home himself to continue his studies. He tells his mother he does not intend to become a priest.

== Cast ==
- Kiefer Sutherland as Donald Campbell
- Liv Ullmann as Jenny Campbell
- Peter Donat as Will Campbell
- Alan Scarfe as Sergeant Tom Coldwell
- Mathieu Carrière as Father Chaisson
- Chris Wiggins as Chief Charlie McInnes
- Thomas Peacocke as Father McKinnon
- Isabelle Mejias as Mary McNeil
- Jane MacKinnon as Dianna Coldwell
- Leah Pinsent as Saxon Coldwell
- Peter Spence as Joe Campbell

== Production ==
The film was shot entirely on location in Cape Breton, and primarily in Glace Bay. Many of the extras are performed by local residents. Principal photography took place from November 3 to December 17, 1983.

== Historical Background ==
The murder subplot was loosely based on the real-life murders on June 17, 1941, of Hyman and Rebecca Brodie in Glace Bay. The couple were killed by their tenant, Sgt. Arthur Frost of the Glace Bay town police, after they told him he was being evicted for non-payment of rent. Frost was acquitted by reason of insanity and spent the rest of his life in a Nova Scotia insane asylum.

== Awards ==
The film won the Genie Award for Best Canadian Film, Screenplay, Supporting Actor (Alan Scarfe), Art Direction (Wolf Kroeger), Costumes and Sound

== Home video ==
The film was released on home video in the United States under the title Bad Company.
