= Next of Kin (1984 film) =

- Directed by: Atom Egoyan
- Written by: Atom Egoyan
- Produced by: Atom Egoyan
- Starring: Patrick Tierney; Berge Fazlian; Sirvart Fazlian; Arsinée Khanjian
- Cinematography: Peter Mettler
- Edited by: Atom Egoyan
- Music by: The Song and Dance Ensemble of Armenia; Atom Egoyan
- Distributed by: Connoisseur Video
- Release date: November 30, 1984 (United States)
- Running time: 72 minutes
- Country: Canada
- Language: English

Next of Kin is a 1984 film directed by Atom Egoyan. It is Egoyan's first feature film and won two prizes at the International Filmfestival Mannheim-Heidelberg and was nominated for Best Achievement in Direction at the 8th Genie Awards. The film is often cited as the work that first brought Egoyan wider attention on the international festival circuit. The film premiered at the Toronto International Film Festival in 1984 and went on to win the Gold Ducat, the top prize, at the International Filmfestival Mannheim-Heidelberg.

== Plot summary ==
Twenty-three-year-old Peter Foster is an only child who lives at home, where he constantly hears his parents arguing. Because Peter does nothing all day, the family goes to a clinic where a therapist videotapes them. After Peter watches his tape, he views the tape of a troubled Armenian family, who gave their only son away for adoption when they arrived in Canada. Peter decides to visit this family, and he pretends to be their son, Bedros Deryan. The Deryan family welcomes him with open arms, and Peter tries to patch up the poor relationship between George Deryan and his daughter Azah.

== Cast ==
- Patrick Tierney as Peter Foster/Bedros Deryan
- Berge Fazlian as George Deryan
- Sirvart Fazlian as Sonya Deryan
- Arsinée Khanjian as Azah Deryan
- Margaret Loveys as Mrs. Foster
- Thomas Tierney as Mr. Foster
- Andrew Coyne as Man on Elevator

== DVD release ==
Next of Kin was first made commercially available via a DVD set along with Egoyan's second full-length film, Family Viewing. It was also released in the U.K. in BD and DVD by Curzon Artificial Eye.

== Reception ==
Contemporary critics noted Next of Kin as an unusually assured low-budget debut. Writing in Cinema Canada, Gerald Pratley praised the film’s technically accomplished direction and “engaging” narrative for a first feature. Later retrospectives on Egoyan’s work have highlighted Next of Kin as establishing many of his recurring themes around family, video technology, and performance.
