= A Woman in Transit =

- French: La Femme de l'hôtel
- Directed by: Léa Pool
- Written by: Robert Gurik; Michel Langlois; Léa Pool
- Produced by: Bernadette Payeur
- Starring: Paule Baillargeon; Louise Marleau
- Cinematography: Georges Dufaux; Daniel Jobin
- Edited by: Michel Arcand
- Music by: Yves Laferrière
- Production company: ACPAV
- Distributed by: J.-A. Lapointe Films
- Release date: August 21, 1984
- Running time: 89 minutes
- Country: Canada
- Language: French
- Budget: $ 562,000 (estimated)

A Woman in Transit (French: La Femme de l'hôtel) is a 1984 Canadian French-language drama film directed by Léa Pool.

== Plot ==
Andrea Richler (Paule Baillargeon) is a well-known director who returns to her home town of Montreal to film a high-budget musical drama. At her hotel, she has a brief but unsettling encounter with a suicidal elderly woman named Estelle (Louise Marleau). This is briefly forgotten until later when she meets the old lady again and with mounting incredulity Andrea discovers that the actual events in the woman's life mirror the fictional events in the director's film.

== Awards ==
Award	Date of ceremony	Category	Nominees	Result	Ref
Montreal World Film Festival	1984	Carlsberg International Press Prize	Léa Pool	Won	
Festival of Festivals	1984	Best Canadian Film	Léa Pool	Won	
Chicago International Film Festival	1984	Silver Hugo Award for Best Actress	Louise Marleau	Won	
Association québécoise des critiques de cinéma	1985	Prix Luc-Perreault	Léa Pool	Won	
Genie Awards	1985	Best Motion Picture	Bernadette Payeur	Nominated	
Genie Awards	1985	Best Actress	Louise Marleau	Won	
Genie Awards	1985	Best Director	Léa Pool	Nominated	
Genie Awards	1985	Best Original Screenplay	Michel Langlois, Léa Pool	Nominated	
Genie Awards	1985	Best Original Song	Paule Baillargeon, Marjolène Morin, Yves Laferrière — "Touch Me"	Won	
