= Draw! =

1984 television film directed by Steven Hilliard Stern

- Written by: Stanley Mann
- Directed by: Steven Hilliard Stern
- Starring: Kirk Douglas; James Coburn; Alexandra Bastedo
- Theme music composer: Kenneth Wannberg
- Countries of origin: Canada; United States
- Original language: English

Production
- Executive producers: Harold Greenberg; Stuart B. Rekant
- Producer: Ronald I. Cohen
- Production locations: Drumheller, Alberta; Fort Edmonton Park - Fox Drive and Whitemud Drive, Edmonton, Alberta
- Cinematography: Laszlo George
- Editor: Ron Wisman
- Running time: 98 minutes
- Production companies: Astral Film Production Ltd. Holster Productions; HBO Premiere Films; The Bryna Company
- Budget: $ 4,200,000

Original release
- Network: HBO
- Release: July 15, 1984

Draw! is a 1984 American-Canadian Western comedy film directed by Steven Hilliard Stern. It stars Kirk Douglas and James Coburn.

== Plot ==
In the final days of the Old West, a former desperado, Harry Holland (Kirk Douglas), only wants to leave Bell City with money he won fairly at a poker game. However, his way is barred by Reggie Bell (Derek McGrath), a gambler who lost most of the money, the sheriff and a deputy, Wally Blodgett (Graham Jarvis). In the subsequent shoot-out, the sheriff is killed and Holland and Bell are wounded. Holland takes refuge in a hotel along with a 'hostage' - Bess, (Alexandra Bastedo). The townsfolk decide the only thing to do is hire an ex-sheriff, Sam Starret (James Coburn), to 'face down' Holland. But he is now a drunk - can he beat his long-time nemesis?

== Cast ==
- Kirk Douglas as Harry H. Holland
- James Coburn as Sam Starret
- Alexandra Bastedo as Bess
- Graham Jarvis as Wally Blodgett
- Derek McGrath as Reggie Bell
- Jason Michas as Moses
- Len Birman as Ephraim
- Maurice Brand as Mr. Gibson
- Graham McPherson as Eugene Lippert
- Linda Sorenson as Teresa
- Gerard Parkes as Circuit Judge Fawcett
- Richard Donat as Sheriff Harmon
- Frank Adamson as Lenny
- Stuart Gillard as Dr. West
- Larry Musser as Townsman
- Frank C. Turner as Poker Player
- Brian George as Bandido

== Recognition ==
- Linda Sorenson won a Genie Award for Best Performance by an Actress in a Supporting Role
- Nominated for Genie Awards for Best Achievement in Art Direction, Best Achievement in Cinematography, Best Achievement in Overall Sound, Best Achievement in Sound Editing
