= Culture of Manitoba =

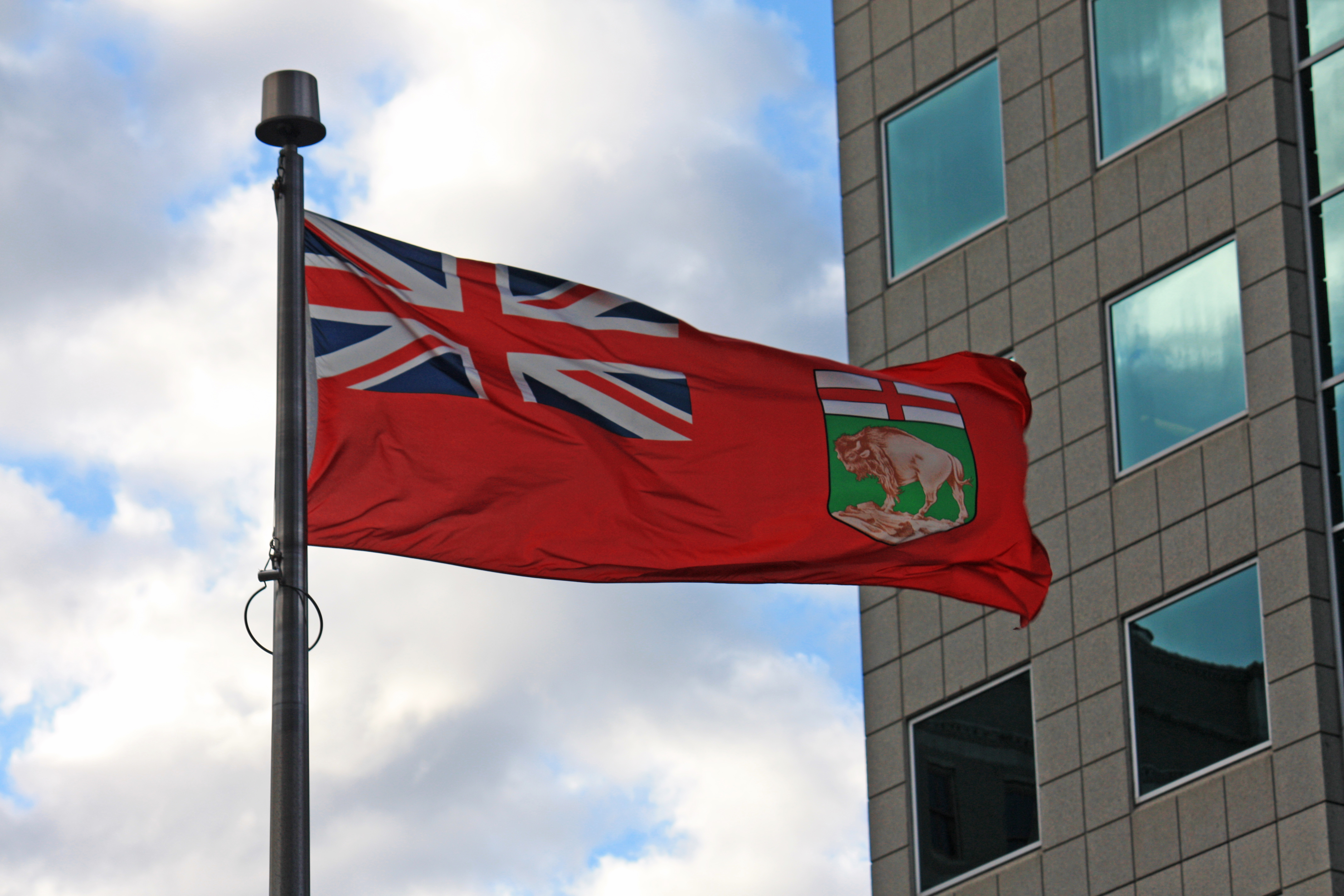
The flag of Manitoba flying in downtown Winnipeg

Manitoban culture is a term that encompasses the artistic elements that are representative of Manitoba. Manitoba's culture has been influenced by both traditional (Aboriginal and Métis) and modern Canadian artistic values, as well as some aspects of the cultures of immigrant populations and its American neighbours. In Manitoba, the Minister of Culture, Heritage, Tourism and Sport is the cabinet minister responsible for promoting and, to some extent, financing Manitoba culture. The Manitoba Arts Council is the agency that has been established to provide the processes for arts funding. The Canadian federal government also plays a role by instituting programs and laws regarding culture nationwide. Most of Manitoba's cultural activities take place in its capital and largest city, Winnipeg.

== Architecture and sites ==
All of Manitoba's notable architectural sites and locations are recognized by the federal government as National Historic Sites.

Among the most notable of these is The Forks in Downtown Winnipeg, located at the confluence of the Red River and Assiniboine River. Other notable sites include Winnipeg's Exchange District, the original commercial centre of Winnipeg; and Lower Fort Garry, the oldest stone fur-trading post in North America that remains intact.

=== Museums ===
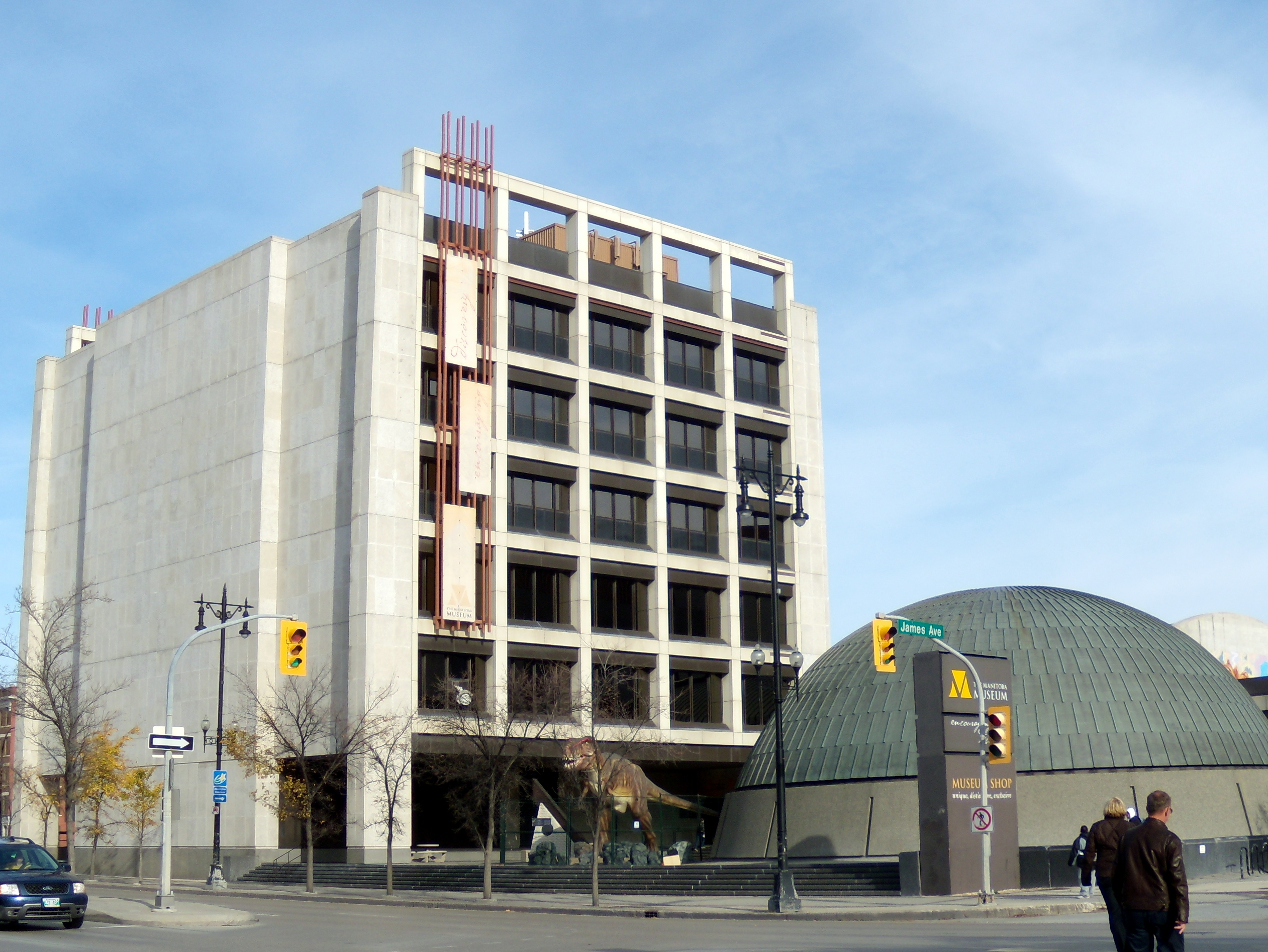
The Manitoba Museum and Planetarium

The Manitoba Museum is the largest museum in Manitoba and focuses on Manitoban heritage from prehistory to the 1920s. It also houses a planetarium and science centre. The full-size replica ship Nonsuch, whose voyage in 1668 led to the founding of the Hudson's Bay Company, is the museum's showcase piece. The Manitoba Children's Museum at The Forks, founded in 1983, presents exhibits for children that also reflect the history and economy of Manitoba. Also located at the Forks, the Canadian Museum for Human Rights has recently (2015) completed construction, and is the first Canadian national museum outside of the National Capital Region.

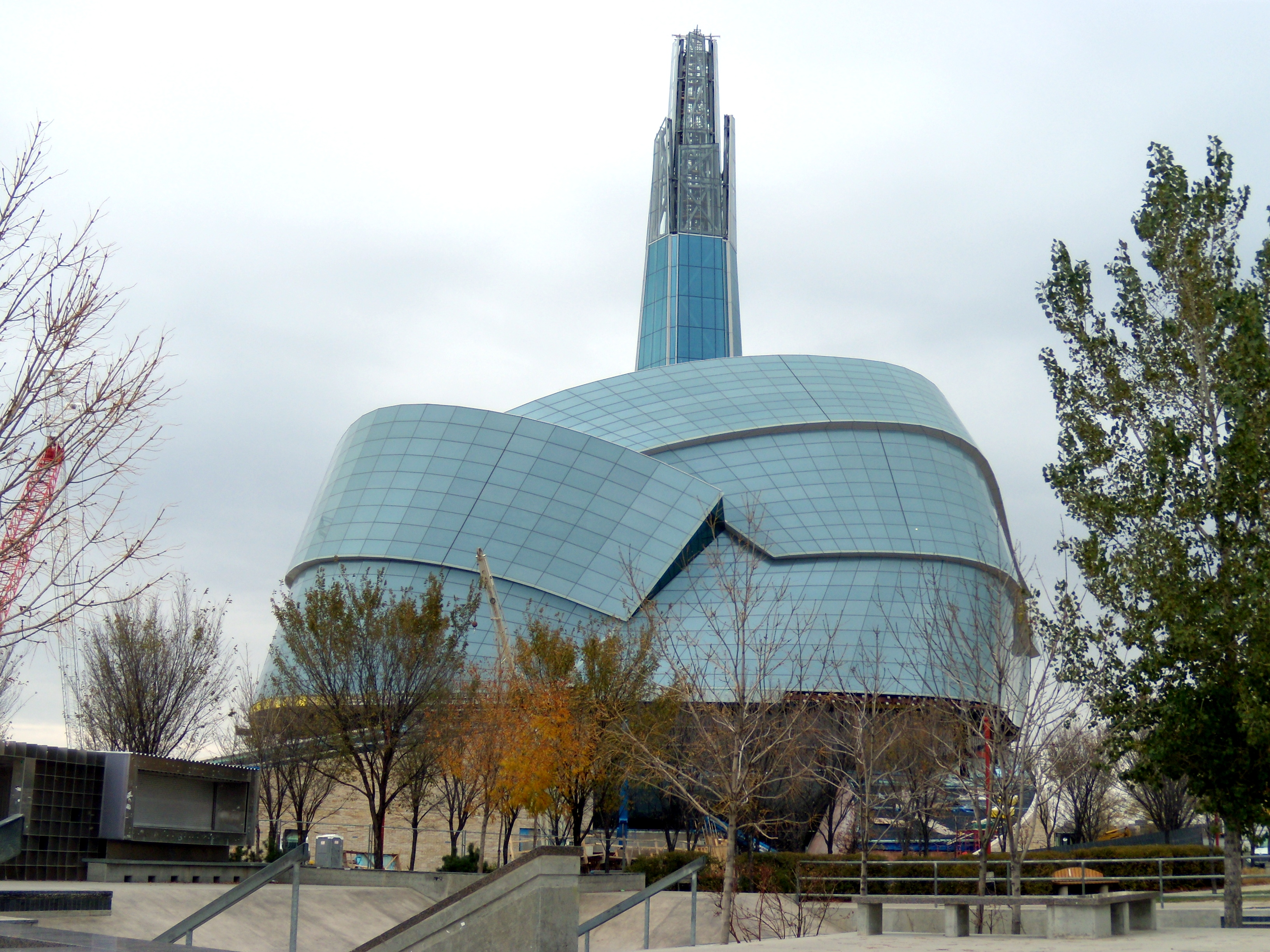
Canadian Museum for Human Rights at The Forks

There are two museums dedicated to the native flora and fauna of Manitoba: the Living Prairie Museum, a tall grass prairie preserve featuring 160 species of grasses and wildflowers, and FortWhyte Alive, a park encompassing prairie, lake, forest and wetland habitats, home to a large herd of bison. The Canadian Fossil Discovery Centre in Morden, Manitoba houses the largest collection of marine reptile fossils in Canada, which represents the prehistoric fauna of the Manitoba Escarpment area.

Manitoba historically had an economic reliance on agriculture, which is documented in the Manitoba Agricultural Museum in Austin, which is home to Canada's largest collection of vintage farm equipment. Reflecting the importance of transportation in the development of the province, Manitoba has museums featuring the history of aviation, marine transport, and railways in the area. There are also museums devoted to specific immigrant groups. Le Musee de Saint-Boniface Museum reflects Franco-Manitoban and Métis culture and history, and is located in the oldest remaining building in Winnipeg. The Mennonite Heritage Village in Steinbach documents the history of Russian Mennonite immigrants. The New Iceland Heritage Museum in Gimli is dedicated to preserving the history and artifacts of the large population from Iceland who immigrated to the Interlake region of Manitoba (now referred to as New Iceland).

== Visual arts ==
The Winnipeg Art Gallery (WAG) is a public art gallery founded in 1912 as Canada's first civic gallery (and the sixth-largest in the country). Including the world's largest public collection of contemporary Inuit art, the WAG's permanent collection holds over 20,000 works, with a particular emphasis on Manitoban and Canadian art.

== Music ==
Manitoba's traditional music has strong roots in Métis and Aboriginal culture. Manitoba is a center for the old-time fiddling of the Métis people. In the early 1990s Inuit Susan Aglukark, born in Churchill, emerged as a nationally successful adult contemporary singer. Manitoba also has strong classical and popular music traditions.

=== Classical ===
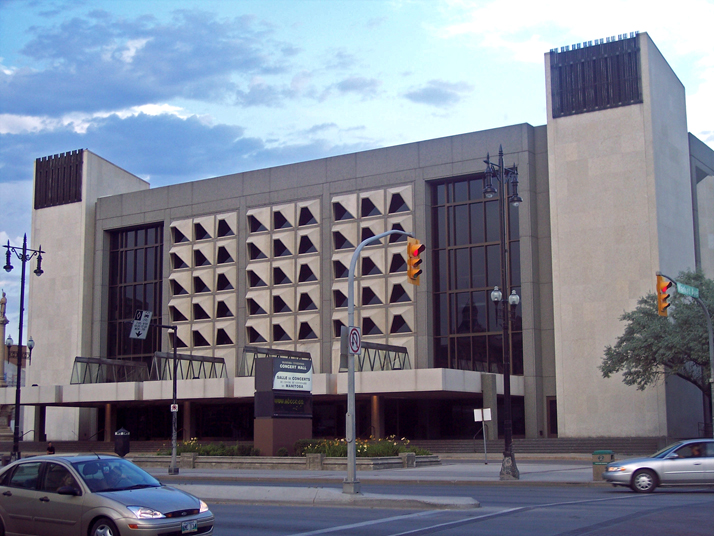
Centennial Concert Hall

The Winnipeg Symphony Orchestra (WSO) performs at the Centennial Concert Hall in Winnipeg, and the orchestra also performs throughout the province of Manitoba. The Manitoba Chamber Orchestra (MCO) is a chamber orchestra, also based in Winnipeg. At the biennial meeting of the Association of Canadian Orchestras in 1990, the MCO was presented with a SOCAN Award of Merit for "the imaginative programming of contemporary Canadian music." The Centennial Concert Hall is also home to Manitoba Opera, which first performed in 1970.

=== Popular ===
- The Canadian 1960s group The Guess Who became the first Canadian band to have a No. 1 hit in the United States. Their songs include "American Woman" and "These Eyes".
  - Former Guess Who guitarist Randy Bachman later created Bachman–Turner Overdrive (BTO), which became popular with such hits as "Takin' Care of Business" and "You Ain't Seen Nothin' Yet".
  - Burton Cummings, who had been lead singer of the Guess Who, also had a successful solo career.
- Rocker Neil Young played with Stephen Stills in the band Buffalo Springfield, and again with Crosby, Stills, Nash & Young. Young is best known as a solo artist, producing albums like Harvest.
- Tom Cochrane, originally from Northern Manitoba's Lynn Lake, fronted Red Rider; as a solo artist, he recorded five albums and wrote the song "Life Is a Highway".
- Daniel Lavoie is perhaps the most popular franco-Manitoban artist, having hits in both Canada and France.
- Laurel Ward's career was Toronto-based, but she was born and raised in Delta, Manitoba, daughter of notable Manitoba wildlife artist and conservationist Peter Ward. She was a solo singer in the '60s before joining Dr. Music and then teamed up with her husband Terry Black as Black and Ward.
- Folk-rock band Crash Test Dummies formed in the late 1980s in Winnipeg and were the 1992 Juno Awards Group of the Year.
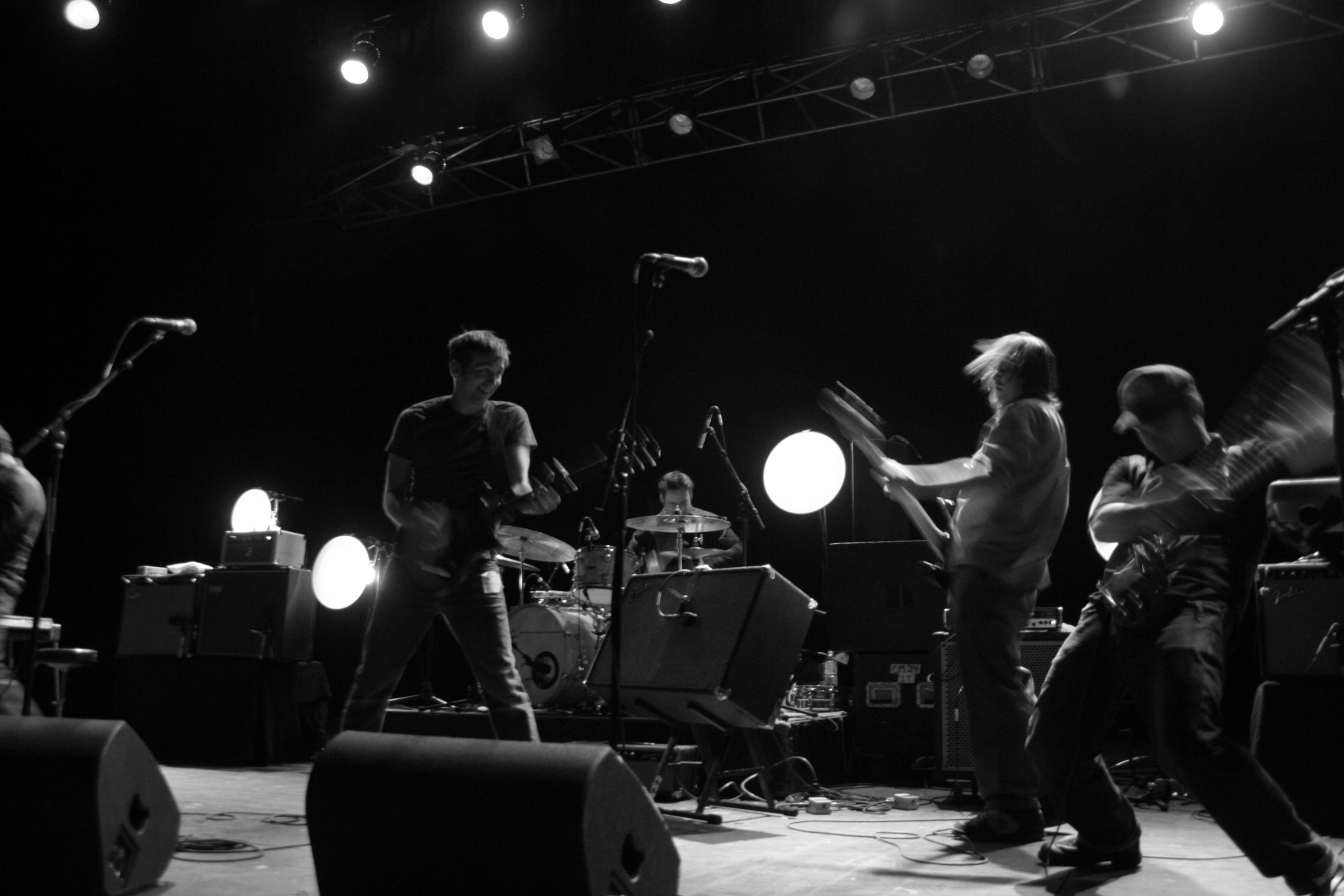
- The Weakerthans performing in Winnipeg
  Juno Award-winning artist Chantal Kreviazuk was raised in Manitoba, as was Juno nominee Bif Naked.
- Winnipegger Remy Shand earned a Juno Award for Best R&B/Soul Recording, and four Grammy nominations with The Way I Feel.
- Portage la Prairie punk rock band Propagandhi won the 2006 ECHO Songwriting Award for their song "A Speculative Fiction"; indie-rockers The Weakerthans won the award in 2008.
- Burnt Project 1 and Eagle & Hawk, both Juno-award-winning groups, combine traditional aboriginal music with modern influences and instrumentation.
- The Duhks and The Wailin' Jennys, also both Juno recipients, continue Manitoba's folk music traditions.

== Dance ==
The Royal Winnipeg Ballet (RWB), based in Winnipeg, is Canada's oldest ballet company and the longest continuously operating ballet company in North America. It was founded in 1939 as the "Winnipeg Ballet Club" by Gweneth Lloyd and Betty Farrally, and includes a school for dancers. The RWB was granted its royal title in 1953, the first granted under Queen Elizabeth II. Manitoba is also known for Métis and aboriginal traditional dances. Among these is the Red River Jig, a combination of aboriginal pow-wows and European reels that was popular among early settlers.

== Theatre ==
Manitoba's theatre groups are largely based in Winnipeg. Le Cercle Molière (founded 1925) is the oldest theatre in Canada. Manitoba Theatre Centre (MTC; founded 1958) is Canada's oldest English-language regional theatre. The Prairie Theatre Exchange, another Winnipeg theatre, was started in 1960 as the Manitoba Theatre School by MTC. Manitoba Theatre for Young People was the first English-language theatre to win the Canadian Institute of the Arts for Young Audiences Award, and offers plays for children and teenagers as well as a theatre school. Rainbow Stage (opened 1954) is Canada's longest-surviving outdoor theatre. Other Manitoban theatre companies include Shakespeare in the Ruins, the Winnipeg Jewish Theatre, and Merlyn Productions.

== Film ==
Several prominent Canadian films were produced in Manitoba, including For Angela (1993); The Saddest Music in the World (2003); The Stone Angel (2007), based on the 1964 book of the same name; My Winnipeg (2007); and Foodland (2010).

Guy Maddin, the writer and director of My Winnipeg, is a prominent Manitoban screenwriter and film director. Cordell Barker, considered to be one of Canada's best animators, is also Manitoban, whose most notable animated short is the Oscar-nominated The Cat Came Back (1988). Another prominent Manitoban animator, Richard Condie, is best known for his 1985 work The Big Snit, which was nominated for an Oscar and won the Genie Award for Best Animated Short, along with over a dozen international awards. Condie is a founding member of the Winnipeg Film Group.

Several major American films were shot in Manitoba, among the most prominent of which are Capote (2005) and The Assassination of Jesse James by the Coward Robert Ford (2007), both of which received Academy-Award nominations. Winnipeg-based Frantic Films has provided special effects for several American films, including Superman Returns (2006), Journey to the Center of the Earth (2008), and Duplicity (2009).

== Mass media ==
Winnipeg has two daily newspapers: the Winnipeg Free Press and the Winnipeg Sun. There are five weekly newspapers delivered free to most Winnipeg households based on geography. There are several ethnic weekly newspapers, as well as regionally- and nationally-based magazines based in the city. Brandon has one regular local newspaper: the Brandon Sun. Many small towns have local newspapers, examples of which include the Carillon News, The Minnedosa Tribune, and the Thompson Citizen; some also receive deliveries of Brandon or Winnipeg papers.

Winnipeg is home to 21 AM and FM radio stations, three of which are French-language stations. Brandon's five local radio stations are provided by Astral Media and Westman Communications Group. In addition to the Brandon and Winnipeg stations, radio service is provided in rural areas and smaller towns by Golden West Broadcasting and Corus Entertainment, as well as a few local broadcasters. CBC Radio broadcasts local and national programming throughout the province. NCI is devoted to Aboriginal programming and broadcasts to many of the isolated native communities as well as to larger cities.

=== Television ===
There are five English-language television stations and one French-language station based in Winnipeg that supply free programming to the city and surrounding areas. Cable television in Winnipeg is provided by Shaw Communications, while in Brandon cable television is provided by Westman Cable, which also operates a local community channel. BellMTS provides cable-tv through most of the province via Bell Fibe TV. Additionally, American network affiliates broadcasting from North Dakota are available over-the-air in many parts of Southern Manitoba.

A number of television shows have been produced and filmed in Manitoba. APTN National News, a national program of the Aboriginal Peoples Television Network, broadcasts from Winnipeg, as did the CBC reality show It's a Living. Falcon Beach, an internationally-broadcast drama, was filmed at Winnipeg Beach, but has since been cancelled. Several children's shows, including Tipi Tales, The Adventures of Shirley Holmes, and My Life as a Dog were also produced in Manitoba. Less Than Kind, a comedy series set in Winnipeg, won two trophies at the 2009 Canadian Comedy Awards.

Manitoba has also appeared in popular American television shows, including in an episode of The Simpsons where Homer visited Winnipeg.

== Literature ==
Many of Manitoba's authors have received national and international recognition for their work.

- Sandra Birdsell, CM, born 1942 Hamiota, Manitoba, is a novelist and short story writer of Métis and Mennonite heritage.
- Bertram Brooker won the first-ever Governor General's Award for Fiction in 1936.
- Robert Kroetsch, Adele Wiseman, Joan Thomas, Miriam Toews, and Katherena Vermette are also among the Manitoban recipients of the Governor General's Award.
- David Bergen won the Scotiabank Giller Prize for The Time in Between.
- A. E. van Vogt, born in Gretna, Manitoba, is one of the most popular writers of the Golden Age of Science Fiction.
- Cartoonist Lynn Johnston, author of the comic strip For Better or For Worse, was nominated for a Pulitzer Prize and inducted into the Canadian Cartoonist Hall of Fame.
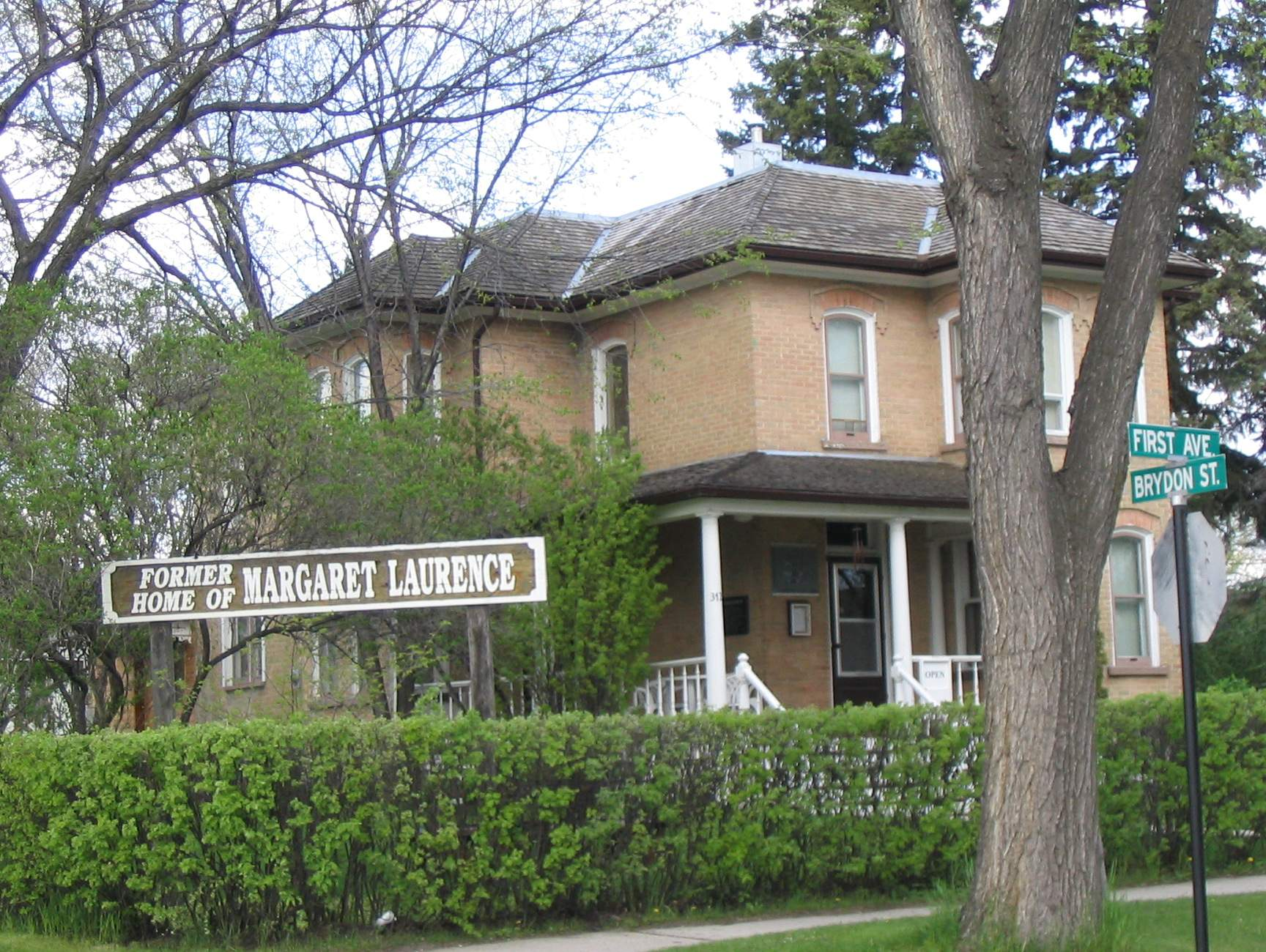
  The Margaret Laurence Home in Neepawa
- Margaret Laurence, who lived in Neepawa, Manitoba for most of her life, was described by the CBC as "one of Canada's most esteemed and beloved authors by the end of her literary career." Her The Stone Angel, along with several other stories, was set in Manawaka, a fictional town representing Neepawa. Laurence won the Governor General's Award in 1966 for A Jest of God.
- Gabrielle Roy, a Franco-Manitoban writer born in Saint Boniface, Manitoba, won the Governor General's Award three times. A quote from her writings is featured on the Canadian $20 bill.
- Carol Shields won both the Governor General's Award and the Pulitzer Prize for The Stone Diaries. She wrote most of her books while teaching English at the University of Manitoba.
- Manitoba is also home to a significant presence of Mennonite literature, such as the work by David Bergen, Sandra Birdsell, Miriam Toews, Paul Hiebert, Armin Wiebe, Dora Dueck, Di Brandt, Lois Braun, Sarah Klassen, Patrick Friesen, Casey Plett, Andrew Unger and others.

== Festivals ==
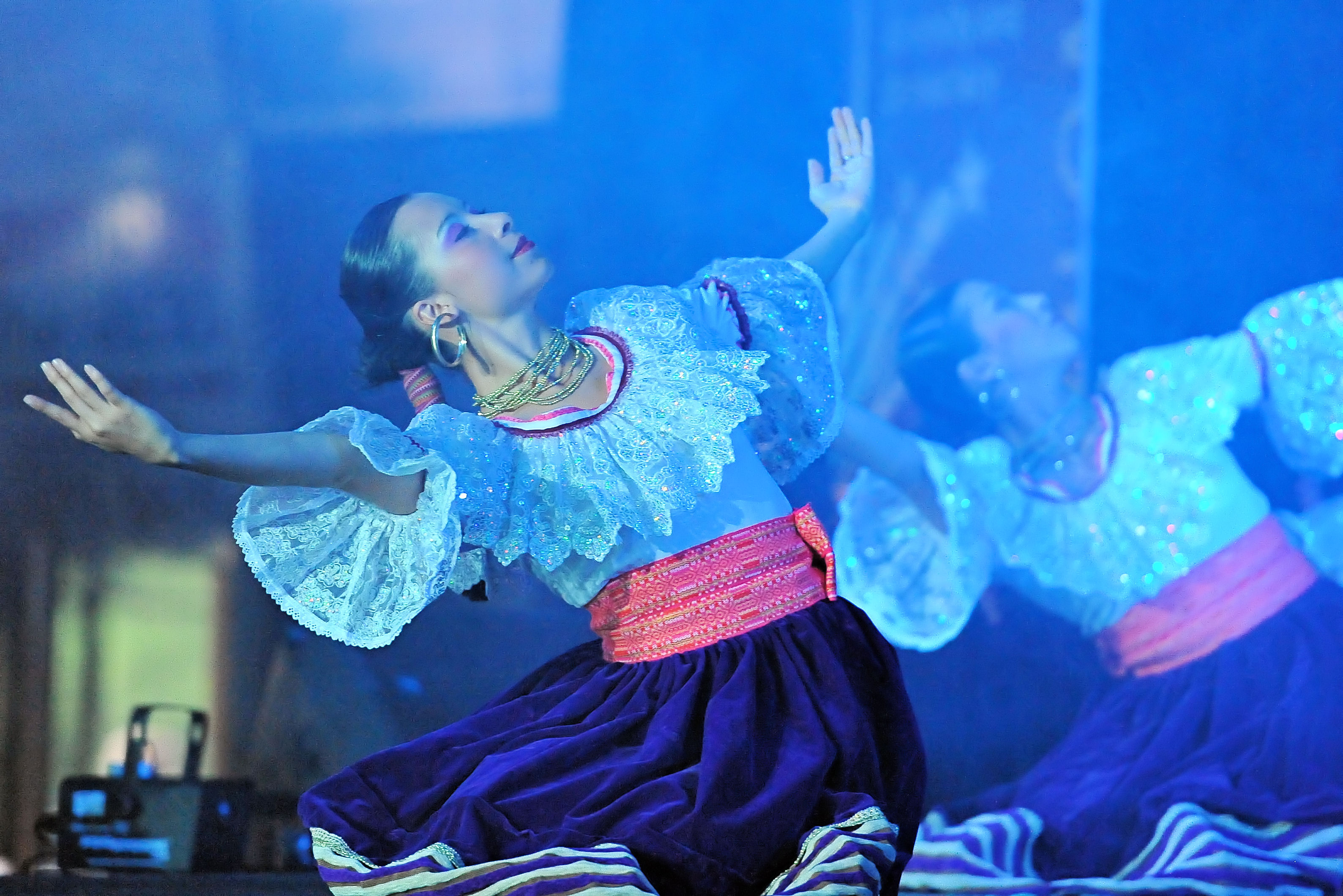
Colombian folklorama dancers

The Festival du Voyageur is an annual 10-day winter festival held in Winnipeg's French Quarter, Saint-Boniface, and is Western Canada's largest winter festival. The event celebrates Canada's fur-trading past and French heritage and culture. Folklorama, run by the Folk Arts Council, bills itself as the largest and longest-running cultural festival in the world. On average, Folklorama receives around 400,000 pavilion visits each year. The 2008 festival received approximately 446,000 pavilion visits. About 21% of pavilion visitors come from outside of Winnipeg.

The Winnipeg Fringe Theatre Festival is an annual alternative theatre festival held in Winnipeg. It is the second-largest North American festival of its kind (after the Edmonton International Fringe Festival). Held around the same time, the Winnipeg Folk Festival is a folk music festival in Birds Hill Provincial Park. It features a variety of folk artists from all around the world, as well as a number of local folk performers. The Royal Manitoba Winter Fair is an annual agricultural fair near the end of March, hosted by the Provincial Exhibition of Manitoba in Brandon; it is one of two fairs in Canada to receive royal patronage. Other major Manitoban festivals include the Gimli Film Festival, the Winnipeg Jazz Festival, the Winnipeg International Writers Festival and the Winnipeg Comedy Festival.

== See also ==
- Manipogo - legendary sea monster purported to inhabit Lake Manitoba
- Red River Exhibition - mobile amusement park held in Winnipeg each summer
- Winnipeg Public Library - the largest public library system in Manitoba
