= Global Playhouse =

Canadian television drama anthology series

Global Playhouse, intermittently also known as Bell Canada Playhouse or Bell Canada Global Playhouse, is a Canadian television drama anthology series, which aired on Global Television Network in the 1980s. A coproduction of Atlantis Films and the National Film Board of Canada, the series aired film adaptations of short stories by Canadian writers.

Its most noted episode was The Painted Door, a dramatization of a short story by Sinclair Ross which was an Academy Award nominee for Best Live Action Short Film at the 57th Academy Awards in 1985. Other stories adapted for the series included Ross's "One's a Heifer", Mordecai Richler's "Bambinger", Margaret Laurence's "To Set Our House in Order", W. D. Valgardson's "Capital", W. P. Kinsella's "John Cat", Guy Vanderhaeghe's "Cages", Morley Callaghan's "All the Years of Her Life" and "A Cap for Steve", David Walker's "A Good Tree", Isabel Huggan's "Jack of Hearts", and Alice Munro's "Connections".

The series produced 26 episodes overall, which aired monthly from 1984 to 1986, and ended production at the discretion of Atlantis Films rather than being cancelled by the network. All 26 episodes were rebroadcast weekly in the 1986-87 television season.
