= David Stouck =

Canadian literary critic and biographer

David Hamilton Stouck (/staʊk/; born 1940) is a Canadian literary critic and biographer, formerly Professor of English at Simon Fraser University.

Stouck is known for exploring the importance of landscape in the arts: Willa Cather's great plains, Sinclair Ross's Saskatchewan prairie, Ethel Wilson's British Columbia. In his biography of Arthur Erickson he focuses on the architect's integration of buildings with their settings, including Simon Fraser University terracing a coastal mountaintop, the University of Lethbridge outlining a prairie coulee, Vancouver's Museum of Anthropology celebrating a shoreline, and domestic homes shoring up hillsides and defining forests.

As an editor and historian he has been concerned to rescue fragile documents, especially letters, and to make them part of the public record.

== Background ==
Stouck was born in Beamsville, Ontario and raised on a farm in the Niagara Peninsula. He was educated at McMaster University (1963) and the University of Toronto (1964), and was employed for 40 years in the English Department at Simon Fraser University. He lived with his wife, Mary-Ann, in West Vancouver up until her death in April of 2020. They have two children and two grandchildren.

== Awards ==
Ethel Wilson: A Critical Biography, was shortlisted for the VanCity Book Prize and Collecting Stamps Would Have Been More Fun: The Correspondence of Sinclair Ross 1933-86, was a finalist for the Alberta Book Prize.

Arthur Erickson: An Architect's Life was shortlisted for six literary awards including the RBC Taylor Prize and won four awards: two BC Book prizes named for Hubert Evans and Roderick Haig-Brown, UBC Library's Basil Stuart-Stubbs Prize for Outstanding Scholarly Book on British Columbia, and the City of Vancouver Book Award.

== Books ==
- Willa Cather’s Imagination (University of Nebraska Press 1975)
- Major Canadian Authors (University of Nebraska Press 1984; Second edition revised and expanded 1988)
- The Wardells and Vosburghs: Records of a Loyalist Family (Jordan Historical Museum 1986)
- Ethel Wilson: Stories, Essays, and Letters ed. (University of British Columbia Press 1987)
- Sinclair Ross’s As for Me and My House: Five Decades of Criticism ed. (University of Toronto Press 1991)
- Willa Cather’s O Pioneers!: A Scholarly Edition (University of Nebraska Press 1993)
- West by Northwest: British Columbia Short Stories, co-editor Myler Wilkinson (Polestar Book Publishers 1998)
- Genius of Place: Writing about British Columbia, co-editor Myler Wilkinson (Raincoast Books 2000) In a review CanLit Quarterly writes, "The pieces show that British Columbia can be many different spaces at once, existing as a space of adventure and possibility, as in the exploration and mountaineering selections featured, but also as a space of imprisonment and oppression, most clearly seen in accounts of Japanese internment camps and the tightly regulated population of Chinatown."
- Ethel Wilson: A Critical Biography (University of Toronto Press 2003)
- As for Sinclair Ross (a biography) (University of Toronto Press 2005)
- Willa Cather’s Shadows on the Rock: A Scholarly Edition, co-editor John Murphy (University of Nebraska Press 2005)
- "Collecting Stamps Would Have Been More Fun": Canadian Publishing and the Correspondence of Sinclair Ross, co-editor Jordan Stouck (University of Alberta Press 2010) Eli McLaren in The Bull Calf Review writes, "David and Jordan Stouck have made a fine contribution to Canadian literary history by presenting these archived and privately held documents. A deftly annotated, illustrated supplement to the former’s 2005 biography (As For Sinclair Ross), "Collecting Stamps" plunges us into the mind of a talented artist baffled in his prime by the Canadian book trade and finally unable, as an old man, to agree with his own fame."
- Arthur Erickson: An Architect’s Life (Douglas & McIntyre 2013) Author David Stouck, acclaimed for his earlier biographies of Ethel Wilson and Sinclair Ross, demonstrates here once again why his work has been praised as imaginative, incisive and compelling. Grounded in interviews with Erickson and his family, friends and clients, as well as the resources of extensive public archives, Arthur Erickson is both an intimate portrait of the man and a stirring account of how Erickson made his buildings work. Beautifully written and superbly researched, it is also a provocative look at the phenomenon of cultural heroes and the nature of what we call "genius." In a review by MacLeans, Ken MacQueen writes, "Stouck, a professor emeritus at SFU, offers a serious, sympathetic portrait of a walking contradiction." The British Columbian says, "David Stouck has written a remarkable history. More than a biography, it is an encompassing account of a remarkable figure in later modern Canadian and international cultural history. Stouck recovers the spirit and material record of someone remarkable for qualities of personality and creativity as well as their ambivalence."
