= The Diviners (disambiguation) =

The Diviners is a 1974 novel by Margaret Laurence.

The Diviners may also refer to:

- The Diviners (Bray novel), a 2012 novel by Libba Bray
- The Diviners (film), a 1993 Canadian film
- The Diviners (play), a 1980 play by Jim Leonard
