= To See Ourselves =

- Genre: Drama
- Country of origin: Canada
- Original language: English
- No. of seasons: 3

Production
- Producer: David Peddie
- Running time: 30 minutes

Original release
- Network: CBC Television
- Release: 23 September 1971 – 26 December 1973

To See Ourselves is a Canadian drama anthology television series which originally aired on CBC Television from 1971 to 1973.

== Premise ==
The film drama series was a successor to Theatre Canada (1970). Episodes consisted of new works and adaptations of short stories. Writing was provided by both emerging and established Canadian writers such as Bryan Barney, Shirley Faessler (Can I Count You In?), David French, Stephen Leacock, W. O. Mitchell, Alice Munro, Thomas Raddall, Mordecai Richler (Mortimer Griffin and Shalinsky And How They Settled The Jewish Question), Sinclair Ross (The Painted Door), and D. O. Spettigue (Pity The Poor Piper).

Directors included René Bonnière, Don Owen, Peter Carter, Allan King (Mortimer Griffin and Shalinsky And How They Settled The Jewish Question), Paul Lynch (The Painted Door) and Grahame Woods.

== Scheduling ==
This half-hour series was broadcast as follows (times in Eastern):

Day	Time	Season run	Notes
Thursday	9:30 p.m.	23 September 1971	16 December 1971
Friday	10:00 p.m.	22 September 1972	22 December 1972
Thursday	9:30 p.m.	5 July 1973	27 September 1973
Wednesday	8:30 p.m.	3 October 1973	26 December 1973

Rebroadcasts were aired on various occasions from May 1974 until September 1975.
