= Linda Goranson =

Canadian actress

Linda Goranson (born 1947 in Toronto, Ontario) is a Canadian actress.

== Career ==
Linda Goranson is most noted for her performance in "The Spike in the Wall", a 1970 episode of the CBC Television drama anthology series The Manipulators, for which she won the Canadian Film Award for Best Actress in a Non-Feature at the 22nd Canadian Film Awards; her performance, in which her character removed her blouse to attract her husband's attention, was also controversial as the first topless scene ever broadcast on Canadian network television.

She also appeared in the films The Trap, The Rowdyman, Too Outrageous!, The Painted Door, Confidential, The Gate, Ordinary Magic, Harrison Bergeron, Dirty Pictures, Owning Mahowny and Drifting Snow, and had recurring roles in the television series The Whiteoaks of Jalna, The Newcomers, Traders and Cardinal. She is most prominently associated with stage roles, including productions of William Shakespeare's Measure for Measure, Jane Martin's Talking With..., Neil Simon's Brighton Beach Memoirs, Agatha Christie's And Then There Were None and Joe DiPietro's Over the River and Through the Woods.

== Personal life ==
She was married to film director Peter Carter until his death.

== Filmography ==
=== Film ===
Year	Title	Role	Notes
1966	The Trap	Trader's Daughter	
1972	The Rowdyman	Ruth Lowe	
1972	A Fan's Notes	Limpid	
1986	Confidential	Mrs. Jameson	
1986	Lost!	Wilma	
1987	The Gate	Terry's Mom	
1989	Millennium	Hostage	
1993	Ordinary Magic	Mayor's Wife	
2003	Owning Mahowny	Belinda's Mother	
2010	Casino Jack	President Bush's Secretary	
2015	Let's Rap	Gladys	
2015	Gridlocked	Nancy	
2019	Samanthology	Talent Agent	
2021	Drifting Snow	Myrna	
2022	The Devil's Void	Suzanne	

=== Television ===
Year	Title	Role	Notes
1971, 1972	Dr. Simon Locke	Helen / Carrie	2 episodes
1972–1975	The Whiteoaks of Jalna	Victoria	5 episodes
1973	Program X	Shirley	Episode: "Nightmare"
1979	An American Christmas Carol	Mrs. Doris Thatcher	Television film
1981	The Great Detective	Cathy	Episode: "A Question of Loyalties"
1983, 1985	The Littlest Hobo	Mrs. Greene / Mrs. McKinley	3 episodes
1985	The Edison Twins	Mrs. Blake	Episode: "Water Witch"
1985	ABC Weekend Special	Mrs. Settergren	Episode: "Pippi Longstocking"
1985	Night Heat	Sandra Kemp	Episode: "Poison"
1985	The Execution of Raymond Graham	Eileen O'Brien	Television film
1987	Hoover vs. The Kennedys	Ethel Kennedy	2 episodes
1988	Danger Bay	Fiona Todd	Episode: "Second Best"
1988	The Ray Bradbury Theater	Mother	Episode: "The Emissary"
1988	Glory Enough for All	Nurse Scott	Television film
1989	War of the Worlds	Connie	Episode: "Dust to Dust"
1990	E.N.G.	Mrs. Ascott	Episode: "Payment in Kind"
1991	Top Cops	Brenda	1 episode
1992	Street Legal	Dr. Grant	Episode: "The Phoenix"
1992	A Town Torn Apart	Sherry Danza	Television film
1992	The Good Fight	Nurse	Television film
1993	Forever Knight	Mrs. Shore	Episode: "Fatal Mistake"
1993	Gross Misconduct: The Life of Brian Spencer	Irene Spencer	Television film
1993	Rapture	Shane	Television film
1993	Woman on the Run: The Lawrencia Bembenek Story	Connie Bell	Television film
1993	David's Mother	Saleswoman	Television film
1995	The Possession of Michael D.	Helene	Television film
1995	Harrison Bergeron	Hazel Bergeron	Television film
1996	Mr. and Mrs. Loving	Mother Loving	Television film
1996	Escape Clause	Car Crash Mother	Television film
1996	Undue Influence	Elevator Passenger	Television film
1996	Traders	Gillian Cunningham	4 episodes
1997	Lies He Told	Carolyn Bay	Television film
1997	Psi Factor	Miss Maxwell	Episode: "Fire Within/Fate"
1998	Evidence of Blood	Mrs. Hunter	Television film
1998	Flood: A River's Rampage	Donna Powers	Television film
1998	Exhibit A: Secrets of Forensic Science	Danielle Thomas	Episode: "The Gun Men"
2000	Dirty Pictures	Mary	Television film
2001	Jackie, Ethel, Joan: The Women of Camelot	Lady Bird Johnson	Television film
2002	Pretend You Don't See Her	Mrs. Hoffman	Television film
2003	Sue Thomas: F.B.Eye	June McMullen	Episode: "The Heist"
2004	This Is Wonderland	Mrs. Keeler	Episode #1.2
2004	A Separate Peace	Mrs. Carmichael	Television film
2004, 2007	72 Hours: True Crime	Kathy Fuller / Dora McPhee	2 episodes
2011	Warehouse 13	Mrs. Martin	Episode: "Queen for a Day"
2013	Hemlock Grove	Magdalena	Episode: "The Price"
2014	Remedy	Cathy	Episode: "Bad Blood"
2016	Shadowhunters	Grandma	Episode: "Major Arcana"
2017	Schitt's Creek	Linda	Episode: "Sebastien Raine"
2018	Designated Survivor	Old Woman	Episode: "Run"
2018	Killer High	Mrs. Blakeslee	Television film
2019–2021	The Moodys	Grandma Mary	4 episodes
2020	Transplant	Lena Joseph	Episode: "Eid"
2020	Cardinal	Adele	2 episodes
