= Program X =

- Genre: Anthology
- Presented by: Charles Oberdorf
- Country of origin: Canada
- Original language: English
- No. of seasons: 3

Production
- Executive producer: Paddy Sampson
- Running time: 30 minutes

Original release
- Network: CBC Television
- Release: 17 December 1970 – 15 June 1973

Program X is a Canadian anthology television series that aired on CBC Television from 1970 to 1973.

== Premise ==
Various entertainment works were presented in this series whose limited budget was $5000 to $7000 per episode. A goal of the series was to encourage works by new writers and to allow for some experimental works.

CBC management originally intended to combine Program X with another new production, Canadian Short Stories, to form a common Theatre Canada series despite the radically different concepts of each production. However, the Dominion Drama Festival intended to rename itself Theatre Canada and objected to CBC's plan. Theatre Canada was subtitled Canadian Short Stories and aired Thursday evenings from September 1971 as a separate series which was replaced by Program X in that time slot from December 1971.

== Scheduling ==
This half-hour series was broadcast as follows (times in North American Eastern):

Day	Time	Season run
Thursdays	9:00 p.m.	17 December 1970 to 27 May 1971
Thursdays	10:00 p.m.	3 to 24 June 1971
Thursdays	9:30 p.m.	23 December 1971 to 29 June 1972
Fridays	10:00 p.m.	22 December 1972 to 15 June 1973

== Episodes ==
- debut, "Blackship" (Jack Winter writer), a dramatic work about the sinking of a vessel carrying 460 Chinese migrant workers towards the United States
- "Ashes for Easter", a one-person drama
- "Banana Peel", featuring Billy Van, science fiction
- "Bits And Pieces", a one-man show starring Gordon Pinsent
- "Boss" (Michael Spivak writer), named after the dog in the story who is killed by an insurance agent
- "Charlie Who?", concerning a man who is thrown in the garbage by his wife after he shrinks
- "Concerto for Television" (1971, Norman Symonds), in which wind was demonstrated through a variety of film clips, sound effects and musical selections; television critic Bob Blackburn of the Toronto Telegram condemned this particular episode as "Blind, dumb, mindless fuddle-duddle ... an exercise in pretentious self-indulgence".
- "The Couch" (Grace Richardson writer)
- a Noël Coward revue starring Dinah Christie and Tom Kneebone, based on a Theatre in the Dell performance from Toronto
- "A Day That Didn't Happen", on how a separation affected a pair of former lovers
- "An Evening with Kate Reid", who performed from such works as The Importance of Being Earnest (as Lady Bracknell) and Saint Joan
- "Generation Game", concerning how characters handle theoretical events
- "Gerber's Girls" (Rod Coneybeare writer), concerning an all-male crew who films a feminist group
- "Lemonade" (James Prideaux writer), starring Eileen Herlie and Martha Scott
- "The Musical Chairs" (Warren Collins writer), a fantasy film
- "Nothing to Declare" (Norman Snider and David Cronenberg writers), set in the 1980s during a civil war in Canada and the United States, in which a young man must choose sides
- "One's a Heifer" (Sinclair Ross story, Rudi Dorn adaptation), starring Ed McNamara and his son Miles, concerning a farmer's disturbing behaviour towards a boy; Toronto Telegram television critic Bob Blackburn noted this episode was "an extremely effective mood piece. It has nothing to say but if it doesn't get your nerves on edge, nothing will."
- "Open House" (Joy Fielding writer), a thriller
- "Parallel 68" (John Reeves writer), likening the 416 BC invasion of Melos to the 1968 Warsaw Pact invasion of Czechoslovakia
- "The Picnic" (Warren Collins writer)
- "Secret Weapons" (1972, David Cronenberg), film
- "Sniper" (Rudi Dorn writer), concerning a soldier whose lets his imagination about his life run wild while he pursues a gunman during a protest
- "The System" (Eric Koch and Frank McEnaney writers), a satire
- "Ten Women, Two Men, And A Moose" (adapted from Mia Anderson's play)
- "That Hamilton Woman", a one-woman show starring Barbara Hamilton
- David Watmough, a poet from Vancouver
- "Wind" by Norman Symonds, combining film with Symonds' music

James W. Nichol and Mavor Moore wrote other episodes of Program X, while directors during the series included David Cronenberg, George Jonas and Lorne Michaels.

A film by David Acomba was scheduled for Program X but withdrawn from broadcast ostensibly due to a failure to meet "broadcast standards", although media suggested the possibility of intervention by the Ontario Provincial Police in this case.
