= The Diviners (film) =

- Based on: The Diviners by Margaret Laurence
- Screenplay by: Linda Svendsen
- Directed by: Anne Wheeler
- Starring: Sonja Smits; Doreen Brownstone; Evelyne Anderson
- Music by: Randolph Peters
- Country of origin: Canada
- Original language: English

Production
- Producers: Derek Mazur; Kim Todd
- Cinematography: Rene Ohashi
- Editor: Sally Paterson
- Running time: 117 minutes
- Production company: Atlantis Films Limited Credo Entertainment Group

Original release
- Network: CBC Television
- Release: January 3, 1993

The Diviners is a Canadian television film, which aired on CBC Television in 1993. Directed by Anne Wheeler, the film is an adaptation of the novel The Diviners by Margaret Laurence.

== Plot ==
The storyline follows Morag Gunn from her tough childhood in Manitoba, Canada to middle-age adult life. A key theme of the movie is Morag's search for love. The story also introduces unique characters from the Manawaka series. The film provides a glimpse into many ways that society creates outcasts socially. The film also explores mythology, as illustrated by Christie's Scottish Piper Gunn, Métis hero Jules Tonnerre, Morag's novel and songs by Skinner and Piquette. As Margaret Laurence's crowning achievement, The Diviners shows that truth and love can be "divined" in many ways.

== Cast ==
- Marion Bennett as Morag (13 years old)
- Sonja Smits as Morag (adult)
- Jay Brazeau as Gus
- Lee J. Campbell as Lachlan
- Nicola Cavendish as Ella
- Victor Cowie as Dr. McCleod
- Diane Douglass as Prin
- Don Francks as Royland
- Ellen-Ray Hennessy as Fan
- Tom Jackson as Jules
- Geordie Johnson as Brooke
- Jennifer Podemski as Pique
- Wayne Robson as Christie

== Production ==
A film adaption of The Diviners starring Susan Clark was announced in Variety in 1977. Judy Steed and Joyce Wieland co-produced and Charles Pachter was an associate producer. Shooting was planned for spring 1978, and a release date of winter 1979. Eighteen investment units for the film were sold at $50,000 each. Eric Till was hired to direct and Margaret Atwood to write the screenplay, but both were fired. The producers considered making a pilot for a television series instead of a film. The film was never made and the film rights were given to the Canadian Film Development Corporation.

== Works cited ==
- Knelman, Martin (1987). Home Movies: Tales from the Canadian Film World. Key Porter Books. ISBN 1550130498.
