= Bruce Pittman =

Canadian film director

- Born: Ronald Bruce Pittman; February 4, 1950 (age 76); Ontario, Canada
- Occupations: Film director, writer, producer
- Years active: 1966–present

Ronald Bruce Pittman (born February 4, 1950) is a Canadian television and film director best known for directing the 1987 horror film Hello Mary Lou: Prom Night II. He also directed the 1989 film Where the Spirit Lives, which won the Gemini Award for Best TV movie and numerous international awards.

He is a member of the Directors Guild of Canada and the Directors Guild of America.

== Early life and career ==
Born in Ontario, on February 4, 1950. Pittman attended Park Lawn Public School, Royal York Collegiate and Kipling Collegiate in Etobicoke.

In 1966, he made his first student film, which received an Honorable Mention at the Kodak Student Film Festival in Rochester, New York.

That year he began working at the Odeon Humber Theatre learning every aspect of film exhibition.

From 1968 through 1972 Pittman worked at Famous Players in their publicity department, Communikon a market research company which was a subsidiary of Paramount Pictures and Allan King Associates directing their independent film distribution. He also opened the Revue Cinema in Toronto.

Pittman began professional filmmaking in 1971 with documentary films about other filmmakers: Freddie Young and John Frankenheimer. In 1974 with Elwy Yost and Jim Hanley he co-created and was Producer/Director of TVOntario's long running show Saturday Night At The Movies.

Beginning in 1977 Pittman embarked on directing dramatic films with a series of half hour programs based on Canadian short stories one of which, The Painted Door, was nominated for an Academy Award as Best Live Action Short. In 1984 he directed his first feature The Mark Of Cain followed by Confidential and Hello Mary Lou: Prom Night II which 30 years later has developed into a minor cult classic.

Over the next 27 years Pittman directed 19 feature length dramas and mini series and 98 episodes of 27 series for 12 North American networks.

His directorial work has resulted in 102 award nominations and 57 wins in Canada and internationally for his films.

Since 2004 he has worked exclusively on 51 independent dramatic and documentary productions.

== Filmography ==
- The Olden Days Coat (1981), based on a short story by Margaret Laurence.
- I Know a Secret (1982), based on a short story by Amy Cooper.
- David (1983), based on a poem by Earle Birney.
- Cornet at Night (1983), based on a short story by Sinclair Ross
- The Painted Door (1984), nominated for an Academy Award for Best Live Action Short.
- Mark of Cain (1984), based on a play by Peter Colley.
- Legs of the Lame (1985}, based on a short story by Hugh Garner.
- Confidential (1986), an original screenplay by Bruce Pittman.
- Hello Mary Lou: Prom Night II (1986). Samuel Goldwyn Company.
- Chasing Rainbows (1988), CBC mini series.
- Harrison Bergeron (1995), Showtime movie based on a short story by Kurt Vonnegut.
- Captive Heart: The James Mink Story (1995), CBS movie.
- To Brave Alaska (1996), ABC movie.
- To Dance with Olivia (1996), CBS movie.
- Undue Influence (1996), CBS mini-series.
- The Secret Path (1999), CBS TV film.
- Shattered City: The Halifax Explosion (2003), CBC mini-series.
- The Last Movie (2012), Best Foreign Language Film, Long Island International Film Festival.

== Major awards and nominations ==
- 1989, Where the Spirit Lives (1989), Gold Plaque (Television Production - Feature Film Made for TV - Network Special Achievement in Direction), Chicago International Film Festival.
- 1989, Where the Spirit Lives (1989), Most Popular Canadian Film, Vancouver International Film Festival.
- 1990, Where the Spirit Lives (1989), Lucas Award (Children's Section), Lucas - International Festival of Films for Children and Young People.
- 1990, Where the Spirit Lives (1989), nominated for Best Direction in a Dramatic Program or Mini-Series, Gemini Award
- 1993, Beyond Reality (1991), nominated for Best Direction in a Dramatic or Comedy Series, Gemini Award
- 1996, Harrison Bergeron (1995), nominated for Best Direction in a Dramatic Program or Mini-Series, Gemini Award
- 2004, Shattered City: The Halifax Explosion (2003), nominated for DGC Team Award (Outstanding Team Achievement in a Television Movie or Mini-Series), Directors Guild of Canada
- 2004, Shattered City: The Halifax Explosion (2003), nominated for Best Direction in a Dramatic Program or Mini-Series, Gemini Award
