= Atlantis Communications =

Canadian television production company

- Type: Public
- Traded as: TSX: ATV
- Founded: 1978; 48 years ago
- Founder: Michael MacMillan; Janice L. Platt; Seaton S. McLean
- Defunct: 1998; 28 years ago
- Fate: Merged with Alliance Communications to form Alliance Atlantis
- Successor: Alliance Atlantis
- Headquarters: 65 Heward Avenue, Suite 201, Toronto, Ontario, Canada

Atlantis Communications was a Canadian production company and television broadcaster that was formed in 1978 by Queen's University students Michael MacMillan, Janice L. Platt and Seaton S. MacLean. It was later merged in 1998 with Alliance Communications to form Alliance Atlantis Communications.

== History ==
The company made its start in April 1978, first as Birchbark Films Limited, then as Atlantis Films Limited by Queen's University students Michael MacMillan, Janice L. Platt and Seaton S. MacLean, and it was started on $150, making documentaries. A year later, the company set up operations in Toronto to produce films for industry and government.

In 1980, the company started making dramas with an adaptation of The Olden Days Coat. Three years later, the company hit big when the short Boys and Girls won the Academy Award for Best Live Action Short Film. In the mid-1980s, the company entered television production with Ray Bradbury Theater and the fourth season of Airwolf.

In 1983, the same year the company founded, it started Atlantis Television International to serve as international distributor for Atlantis productions and, later, the distribution of outside projects, which in 1987 became Atlantis Releasing, and establishes offices in Toronto, Amsterdam, London and Sydney.

In 1986, it launched a partnership with P.S. Production Services to set up Cinevillage, which was a 4-acre film and video production center in Toronto.

In 1993, the company pushed its operations in the United States, with several made-for-cable movies, such as an adaptation of A Life and His Dog, and two years later, the company entered the cable television business with the launch of Life Network, which in 1996, took control of the network. Also that year, it teamed up with Universal Television to produce the series TekWar.

The company previously held an interest in the YTV network, for which it owned a minority interest in 1994. Also that year, the company had acquired Soundmix Ltd., which was an audio post-production facility in Toronto, and also has interests in Great North Communications and Salter Street Films. In 1995, a minority interest of the company was sold to the Interpublic Group of Companies.

In 1996, the company was an applicant for a Canadian version of HGTV, which would later launch in 1997.

In 1997, the company had signed a distribution deal with CBS Broadcast International to begin distributing content or the Canadian market, for $10 million. Also that year, the company gained a 50% interest in Calibre Digital Pictures, a visual effects company.

Later that year, the company had acquired Ironstar Communications, in order to expand Atlantis' distribution operations in the United States, and hired Ironstar executive Derek McGillvay to join the company as VP of sales.

In 1998, the company would get into the network television business, by teaming up with Beth Sullivan to produce dramas, and produce its UPN series Legacy. Later that year, it merged with Alliance Communications, forming Alliance Atlantis Communications.

Currently, the majority of the former assets of Atlantis Communications are owned by Lionsgate Canada, via its acquisition of eOne in 2023, while the broadcasting unit is owned by Corus Entertainment.

== Productions ==
=== Television series ===
- The Moviemakers (1984–1986)
- The Ray Bradbury Theater (1985–1992)
- Airwaves (1986–1987)
- Airwolf (1987)
- The Twilight Zone (1988–1989)
- Ramona (1988–1989)
- Almost Grown (1988–1989)
- Maniac Mansion (1990–1993)
- Mom P.I. (1990–1992)
- Neon Rider (1990–1995)
- Monkey House (1991–1992)
- The Boy from Andromeda (1991)
- African Skies (1992–1994)
- Wild Side Show (1992–1993)
- White Fang (1993–1994)
- Destiny Ridge (1993–1994)
- TekWar (1994–1995)
- Mysterious Island (1995)
- Flash Forward (1995–1997)
- The Outer Limits (1995–2002)
- Married Life (1995)
- Adventures of Sinbad (1996–1997)
- Psi Factor: Chronicles of the Paranormal (1996–2000)
- Traders (1996–2000)
- My Life as a Dog (1997)
- Night Man (1997–1999)
- Earth: Final Conflict (1997–2002)
- Cold Squad (1998–2005)
- Legacy (1998–1999)

=== Television movies ===
- Island (1984)
- Miracle at Moreaux (1985)
- Brothers by Choice (1986)
- Really Weird Tales (1987)
- A Child's Christmas in Wales (1987)
- 110 Lombard (1988)
- The Rookies (1989)
- Glory! Glory! (1989)
- Where the Spirit Lives (1989)
- Magic Hour: Tom Alone (1989)
- Dark Horse (1990)
- Clarence (1990)
- Magic Hour: Lost in the Barrens (1990)
- Raider of the South Seas (1990)
- Christmas in America (1990)
- The Girl from Mars (1991)
- Darrow (1991)
- Star Runner (1991)
- Alexander Graham Bell: The Sound and the Silence (1991)
- Alligator Pie (1991)
- Deadly Betrayal: The Bruce Curtis Story (1991)
- Firing Squad (1991)
- Gold: The Merchants of Venus (1991)
- Gold: A Fistful of Gold (1991)
- Gold: The World's Play (1991)
- Gold: The Dynamiters (1991)
- Gold: Frenchie's Gold (1991)
- Lost in the Barrens II: The Curse of the Viking Grave (1992)
- Partners 'n Love (1992)
- The Diviners (1993)
- Adrift (1993)
- Woman on Trial: The Lawrencia Bembenek Story (1993)
- Heads (1994)
- Race to Freedom: The Underground Railroad (1994)
- Harvest for the Heart (1994)
- Sodbusters (1994)
- Avalanche (1994)
- Following Her Heart (1994)
- Trial at Fortitude Bay (1994)
- Trust in Me (1995)
- Friends at Last (1995)
- The Possession of Michael D. (1995)
- Harrison Bergeron (1995)
- Derby (1995)
- The War Between Us (1995)
- The Man in the Attic (1995)
- Night of the Twisters (1996)
- Heck's Way Home (1996)
- We the Jury (1996)
- Borrowed Hearts (1997)

=== Films ===
- Vincent Price's Dracula (1986)
- Cowboys Don't Cry (1988)
- Destiny to Order (1989)
- Cold Front (1989)
- The Quarrel (1991)
- Montreal vu par... (1991)
- Love & Human Remains (1993)

=== Short films ===
- The Olden Days Coat (1981)
- David (1982)
- I Know a Secret (1982)
- Home from Far (1983)
- The Bamboo Brush (1983)
- Cornet at Night (1983)
- Boys and Girls (1983)
- Caroline (1983)
- The Painted Door (1984)
- A Good Tree (1984)
- Bambinger (1984)
- All the Years (1984)
- John Cat (1984)
- One's a Heifer (1984)
- The Cap (1985)
- The Sight (1985)
- Cages (1985)
- Mortimer Griffin and Shalinsky (1985)
- To Set Our House in Order (1985)
- Uncle T (1985)
- The Concert Stages of Europe (1985)
- Going to War (1985)
- The Legs of the Lame (1985)
- Esso (1985)
- Jack of Hearts (1986)
- Connection (1986)
- Happy Birthday Hacker John (1986)
- The Rebellion of Young David (1986)
- The Dream and the Triumph (1986)
- The Trumpeter (1986)
- Red Shoes (1986)
- Letter from Francis (1993)

== Broadcasting ==
- HGTV Canada (80.24%)
- Life Network
