= Isabel Huggan =

Canadian writer

Isabel Huggan (born 1943 in Kitchener, Ontario) is a prize-winning Canadian author of fiction and personal essays.

== Biography ==
Isabel Huggan spent her childhood in Elmira, a small southern Ontario town where her father worked as a manager for the Canadian branch of an American chemical company. She studied English and Philosophy at the University of Western Ontario and in 1965, moved to Toronto to work in publishing. She spent a year traveling in Europe, then returned to Canada and in 1968 began teaching English in Ontario high schools.

In 1970, she married journalist Robert Huggan. They lived in Toronto for two years and then bought an old farm house in Belleville in eastern Ontario, where she was a reporter, photographer and columnist for the local newspaper, The Intelligencer, and he taught journalism at the local community college. In the mid-1970s she began publishing poetry and short stories in Canadian literary magazines; in 1977, after leaving her job, she gave birth to a daughter.

In 1976, Huggan won first prize in a National Film Board of Canada contest for women scriptwriters for a film script based on her short story "Celia Behind Me". She contributed two further stories about Elizabeth, the central character in "Celia Behind Me", for an anthology (First Impressions, Oberon Press, 1980). Another in the same series was published in the annual Oberon Press collection Best Canadian Stories the following year. In 1980, the family moved to Ottawa and she met with Oberon Press editors who published her entire eight-story sequence as The Elizabeth Stories (1984). The book received favorable reviews across the country, and Huggan, by now in her early 40s, began to be recognized as one of Canada's "new writers".

In 1987, the family moved to Kenya where her husband worked in international development. During this time, The Elizabeth Stories was published in Britain and the United States. The posting in Kenya lasted for three years and was followed by a three-year assignment in France, which led to a five-year stay at the International Rice Research Institute in the Philippines. Before leaving France in 1993, Isabel Huggan produced a second collection of short stories, You Never Know, which established her international reputation as a writer.

Huggan taught creative writing in Belleville, and for several years she taught for the University of Ottawa and the Ottawa High School Board. She continued to give writing workshops on return visits to Canada, and over several years taught for schools, universities and private writing groups in France, Switzerland, the Philippines, Australia and Hong Kong. In 1998, she joined the Humber School for Writers in Toronto, teaching at summer workshops and mentoring by correspondence. The same year, Huggan and her husband settled in the south of France where they renovated an old stone house, Mas Blanc.

In 2003, after collaboration with her editor Louise Dennys at Knopf Canada, Huggan brought forward a memoir, Belonging: Home Away from Home, concerning her experiences both in Canada and abroad, combining her personal essays with three short stories in order to show the close relationship between fact and fiction.

After the death of her husband in 2011, Huggan stayed at Mas Blanc and turned a stone barn on her property into a retreat for writers. She continued to work for Humber College as a writing instructor until 2018, and still works privately as a consultant.

In 2020, Huggan sold Mas Blanc and returned to Canada after an absence of 33 years. She has settled in Orillia, Ontario.

She writes and publishes poetry, book reviews, and travel articles, and contributes to literary journals and anthologies.

== Writing ==
Eight stories tracing the growth of the child Elizabeth Kessler over a ten-year period during the 1950s was published as The Elizabeth Stories by Oberon Press in 1984, and in 1987 by Viking Penguin in Great Britain and the United States, where it won the Quality Paperback New Voice Award in 1988 as well as the Best Fiction Prize from the Denver Quarterly. The Elizabeth Stories has been translated into French, Spanish and Turkish: several stories are anthologized in Dutch and Italian as well as often being used in English-language anthologies, especially those for secondary schools and universities. Isabel Huggan's reputation as a short story writer is international.

All but two stories of the collection You Never Know (Knopf Canada and Viking Penguin USA, also translated into French) focus on adult experience, and the various settings—Scotland, France, Canada and Kenya—reflect Huggan's expanding view of the world and of human nature. These stories were a clear departure from her earlier work, and proved that childhood was not the only territory from which she derived inspiration. Several of these stories have been anthologized since appearing in You Never Know and continue to be used in current collections such as Best Canadian Stories (Penguin Canada, 2007).

The process of settling into a new country, learning another language and culture (at the same time as retaining her Canadian identity) forms the basis for Huggan's third book, Belonging: Home Away From Home, a mix of memoir and fiction, published in 2003 by Knopf Canada and in 2004 by Random House Australia. It immediately received extremely favorable attention from critics and the public. In April 2004, it was awarded the prestigious Charles Taylor Prize for Literary Non-fiction in Canada, and in Australia was for some time on the bestseller list.

Belonging was reprinted in Canada and Australia. Readers find their own experiences mirrored in the memoir, as Huggan's life story reminds them of their own: moving from one house or city or country to another, making home over and over again – this is common to more people now than ever before.

Isabel Huggan's stories have been included in several anthologies. Her work appears in Canadian periodicals including Books in Canada, BRICK, Canadian House & Home, Chatelaine, GEO Canada, Harrowsmith, Quarry, The New Quarterly, among others. In the U.S. her work has appeared in Utne Reader and Confetti; in Denmark, Kunapipi; in Australia, in Eureka Street and Meanjin, and in Britain, in Good Housekeeping and Women & Home Magazine.

The Atlantis/National Film Board television short film Jack of Hearts was based on her short story of the same name from The Elizabeth Stories. It aired on Global's Bell Canada Playhouse in 1986.

== Published works ==
- Belonging: Home Away from Home (memoir and fiction)
  - Canada: Alfred A. Knopf Canada Ltd. (2003) Vintage (2004)
  - Australia: Random House (2004)
- You Never Know (short stories)
  - Canada: Alfred A. Knopf Canada Ltd. (1993)
  - United States: Viking Penguin Ltd. (1993)
  - Quebec: translated as On Ne Sait Jamais, L'Instant Même (1996)
- The Elizabeth Stories (short stories)
  - Canada: Oberon Press (1984) & HarperCollins Canada Ltd. (1991)
  - United States: Viking Penguin Inc. (1987)
  - Great Britain: Viking Penguin Ltd. (1987)
  - France: translated as L'Echappée Belle: Gallimard (1990)
  - Spain: translated as En El Corazon Del Bosque: Editorial Lumen (1999)

== Awards ==
- Charles Taylor Literary Non-Fiction Prize, Canada, 2004
- Calliope Award for Outstanding Writing & Teaching, Humber College, Toronto, 2003
- Joe Savago New Voice Award, Quality Paperback Book Club, New York, 1988
- Best Fiction of the Year Award, The Denver Quarterly, Denver, 1988
- Annual Prize for Fiction, Carleton University, Ottawa, 1979
- First Prize, National Film Board Contest for Short Film Scripts by Women, 1977

== Sources ==
- cbc.ca
- http://www.thecharlestaylorprize.ca/2004/winner2004.asp
- https://web.archive.org/web/20071025042627/http://www.writersunion.ca/ww_profile.asp?mem=1032&L=H
- https://web.archive.org/web/20080520105207/http://www.umanitoba.ca/canlit/conference/robert_schuleroutsider.shtml
- https://www.nytimes.com/1988/07/24/books/new-noteworthy.html
