= The Stone Angel (film) =

- Original poster
- Directed by: Kari Skogland
- Written by: Kari Skogland
- Based on: The Stone Angel by Margaret Laurence
- Produced by: Elizabeth Jarvis; Phyllis Lang; Kari Skogland
- Starring: Ellen Burstyn; Christine Horne; Cole Hauser; Dylan Baker; Kevin Zegers; Elliot Page
- Cinematography: Bobby Bukowski
- Edited by: Jim Munro
- Music by: John McCarthy
- Distributed by: Alliance Films
- Release dates: September 12, 2007 (TIFF); May 9, 2008
- Running time: 90 minutes
- Country: Canada
- Language: English
- Box office: $473,993

The Stone Angel is a 2007 Canadian drama film written and directed by Kari Skogland. The screenplay is based on the 1964 novel of the same name by Margaret Laurence.

== Plot ==
The film spans several decades in the unconventional life of feisty nonagenarian Hagar Shipley, who sets off on a journey to reconcile herself with her past when she discovers her son Marvin and daughter-in-law Doris are moving her into a nursing home. In a crumbling house she had lived in when she was first married, Hagar recalls her estrangement from her father, a wealthy Manitoba shopkeeper who disowned her when she married farmer Bram Shipley. Despite her defiance, she considered herself superior to her husband, and treated him callously as their relationship disintegrated and he became an alcoholic. Her younger son John, her favorite, eventually broke her heart by becoming involved with Arlene, a wild girl of whom she disapproved.

Now in hiding, Hagar meets Leo, who enables her to confront the one secret she feels she must take to her grave, namely the role she played in John's death. No longer able to repress her emotions, she realizes the bad decisions and misjudgments she made throughout her life were a result of her resolute stubbornness, and eventually she is able to find closure with Marvin.

== Cast ==
- Ellen Burstyn as Hagar Currie Shipley
  - Christine Horne as Young Hagar Currie Shipley
  - Samantha Weinstein as Child Hagar Currie
- Dylan Baker as Marvin Shipley
  - Devon Bostick as Young Marvin
- Sheila McCarthy as Doris Shipley
- Doreen Brownstone as Silver Elms Bridge Player
- Kevin Zegers as John Shipley
- Elliot Page as Arlene Simmons (Note: Credited as Ellen Page; Page came out as transgender and changed his name in 2020.)
  - Josette Halpert as Young Arlene Simmons
- Wings Hauser as Older Bram Shipley
  - Cole Hauser as Young Bram Shipley
- Aaron Ashmore as Matt Currie
  - Connor Price as Young Matt Currie
- Luke Kirby as Leo

== Production and release ==
The film was shot on location throughout Manitoba, including Winnipeg, Hartney, Landmark, and Lake Winnipeg.

The film premiered at the 2007 Toronto International Film Festival and was shown at Cinefest Sudbury, the Calgary Film Festival, the Edmonton International Film Festival, the Tokyo International Film Festival, the Possible Worlds Film Festival, the Palm Springs International Film Festival, the Female Eye Film Festival, and the Method Fest Independent Film Festival before going into theatrical release in Canada on May 9, 2008, and in the United States on July 11, 2008.

== Critical reception ==
On the review aggregator website Rotten Tomatoes, 46% of 24 critics' reviews are positive, with an average rating of 5.5/10. The website's consensus reads: "Despite fine performances from Ellen Burstyn and newcomer Christine Horne, The Stone Angel fails to escape formulaic melodrama territory." Metacritic, which uses a weighted average, assigned the film a score of 57 out of 100, based on six critics, indicating "mixed or average" reviews.

Philip Marchand of the Toronto Star rated the film 2½ out of four stars and commented, "Does every Canadian movie based on a Canadian novel have to be scored with mournful violins and weeping cellos?"

Stephen Holden of The New York Times thought it was "a film of tightly assembled bits and pieces that don’t fit comfortably together despite clever dashes of magical realism connecting past and present" and felt although "this multigenerational family history has enough gripping moments to hold your attention . . . ultimately it leaves you frustrated by its failure to braid subplots and characters into a gripping narrative." He added, "Ms. Burstyn’s scenery-chewing performance, utterly devoid of vanity, makes her a spiritual cousin of Aurora Greenway in Terms of Endearment."

Eddie Cockrell of Variety called the film "tastefully reverent" and "fundamentally sincere", but felt it suffered from "generational cross-cutting that's both rushed and cluttered" and "would have have (sic) been better served as a more leisurely miniseries."

== Awards and nominations ==
Ellen Burstyn won the Genie Award for Best Performance by an Actress in a Leading Role and John McCarthy won the Genie Award for Best Music Score. The Writers Guild of Canada nominated Kari Skogland for the Canadian Screenwriting Award for Best Feature Film.
