= The Painted Door =

- Directed by: Bruce Pittman
- Written by: Joe Wiesenfeld
- Based on: "The Painted Door" by Sinclair Ross
- Produced by: Michael MacMillan; Janice Platt; Robert Verrall
- Starring: Linda Goranson; Eric Peterson; August Schellenberg
- Cinematography: Savas Kalogeras
- Edited by: Margaret Van Eerdewijk
- Music by: Bruce Levy
- Distributed by: National Film Board of Canada; Atlantis Films
- Release date: 1984 (Canada)
- Running time: 24 minutes
- Country: Canada
- Language: English

The Painted Door is a Canadian short drama film, directed by Bruce Pittman and released in 1984. Based on a short story by Sinclair Ross, the film was produced by the National Film Board of Canada and Atlantis Films of Toronto. It received an Academy Award nomination for Best Live Action Short Film.

== Synopsis ==
The Painted Door is a dark, downbeat film set during a cold prairie winter. Anne (Linda Goranson) stays alone in an isolated farmhouse while her husband, John (August Schellenberg), leaves to help his ailing father. A neighbour, Stephen (Eric Peterson), whom she secretly loves, drops by to help with the chores. When John doesn't return home that night, Anne gives in to temptation, only to wake the next day to the realization of what she has done.

== Cast ==
- Linda Goranson
- Robert Michael
- Daniel Nalbach
- Eric Peterson
- August Schellenberg
- Len Watt

== Distribution ==
The film received theatrical distribution in the United States, while in Canada it aired on Global Television Network as part of the Global Playhouse series of film adaptations of Canadian short stories.

== Accolades ==
- Yorkton Film Festival, Yorkton, Saskatchewan: Golden Sheaf Award, Best Drama Under 30 Minutes, 1985
- Yorkton Film Festival, Yorkton, Saskatchewan: Best Performance by an Actress, Linda Goranson, 1985
- Yorkton Film Festival, Yorkton, Saskatchewan: Best Script, Joe Wiesenfeld, 1985
- Columbus International Film & Animation Festival, Columbus, Ohio: Chris Award, Arts and Culture, 1986
- 57th Academy Awards, Los Angeles: Nominee: Best Live Action Short Film, 1984
