= The Olden Days Coat =

- Genre: Drama; Christmas
- Based on: "The Olden Days Coat" by Margaret Laurence
- Written by: Susan Marcus
- Directed by: Bruce Pittman
- Starring: Megan Follows; Doris Petrie
- Theme music composer: Liona Boyd
- Country of origin: Canada
- Original language: English

Production
- Producers: Michael MacMillan; Seaton McLean; Janice Platt
- Cinematography: Alar Kivilo
- Editor: Seaton McLean
- Running time: 30 minutes
- Production company: Atlantis Films

Original release
- Network: CBC Television
- Release: December 21, 1981

The Olden Days Coat is a Canadian television film, directed by Bruce Pittman and broadcast by CBC Television in 1981. A Christmas-themed family film adapted from a short story by Margaret Laurence, it stars Megan Follows as Sal, a young girl who is upset that the recent death of her grandfather has prevented her family from celebrating Christmas normally, but who learns the true meaning of the season after she finds an old coat belonging to her grandmother (Doris Petrie) which transports her back in time when she puts it on.

It was the first television production by Atlantis Films, which would go on to become one of the major Canadian film studios.

The film had selected film festival screenings prior to its television debut on December 21, 1981. It won the Bijou Award for Best Television Drama Under 30 Minutes, and was an ACTRA Award nominee for Best Children's Television Program at the 11th ACTRA Awards in 1982.

== See also ==
- List of Christmas films
