= Confidential (1986 film) =

1986 Canadian crime drama film

- Directed by: Bruce Pittman
- Written by: Bruce Pittman
- Produced by: Anthony Kramreither
- Starring: Neil Munro; August Schellenberg; Chapelle Jaffe
- Cinematography: John Herzog
- Edited by: Bronwen Hughes; Bruce Pittman
- Music by: Bruce Ley
- Production company: Brightstar Films
- Distributed by: Shapiro Entertainment (U.S.); Pan-Canadian (Canada)
- Release date: September 7, 1986 (TIFF)
- Running time: 95 minutes
- Country: Canada
- Language: English

Confidential is a Canadian crime drama film, directed by Bruce Pittman and released in 1986. Set in the 1940s, the film stars Neil Munro as Hugh Jameson, a journalist who sets out to research an unsolved murder from several decades earlier, but goes missing himself, necessitating the hiring of private detective Charles Ripley (August Schellenberg) to attempt to find him.

The film's cast also includes Chapelle Jaffe, Tom Butler and Linda Goranson.

The film premiered at the 1986 Festival of Festivals.

== Critical response ==
Writing for The Globe and Mail, Jay Scott panned the film as a pale imitation of Chinatown, writing that "Despite an able performance from August Schellenberg (as a private detective) and a spectacular one from Chapelle Jaffe (as a vampirish sicko), Pittman's movie, also at the festival, is a movie about movies that lacks the high style of the genre - hardboiled detective film noir - whose pleasures it strives to revive."

Joel Rubinoff of the Toronto Star also reviewed the film negatively, writing that "ostensibly designed to mirror the dark, moody detective thrillers of the 1940s, Confidential ambles along like a toddler out of the playpen for the first time, staggering here and there, and eventually falling flat on its face. With competent performances from usually stalwart Canadians August Schellenberg, Chapelle Jaffe and Neil Munro, it's not the acting that's at fault. And with the focus on sleazy strip joints, cars with fins and private detectives with crooked grins, it does succeed in evoking the clichéd atmosphere of a '40s detective flick. There is a far more serious problem: writer/director Bruce Pittman's equal dramatic treatment of rambling discussions about bed linen and boarding fees and the unrelated incestual bloodbath. There's mystery here all right, but no logic."
