= Keath Fraser =

Canadian fiction author

- Born: 25 December 1944 (age 81); Vancouver, Canada
- Education: University of British Columbia (B.A., 1966; M.A., 1969); University of London (PhD, 1973)
- Occupations: Author, editor
- Writing career
- Period: 1982–present
- Genre: Fiction,
- Notable awards: (1995) Chapters/Books in Canada First Novel Award for Popular Anatomy; (1986) Ethel Wilson Fiction Prize

Keath Fraser (born 25 December 1944) is a Canadian fiction author. He lived in London from 1970 to 1973, where he studied at the University of London and earned his PhD He later taught English in Calgary, Alberta, Canada for five years as a tenured professor. He then stopped teaching to become a full-time author.

Fraser has travelled widely in Asia, Europe, Australia, India and Cambodia, and these experiences have contributed to his work. Fraser edited the books Bad Trips (1991) and Worst Journeys: The Picador Book of Travel (1992), both humorous anthologies authored by various writers concerning their experiences in foreign lands.

== Writing style ==
Bronwyn Drainie writes, "If you really want to journey into the heart of darkness, you'd be advised to travel with Vancouver writer Keath Fraser, a man of extraordinary talents."

Fraser's dark, vivid and incredibly distinctive writing style ranges very widely in genre, settings and voices and is clearly characterized by his love of the city of Vancouver, his birthplace and home since his return from London in 1973. In 1997, what turned out to be a controversial biography by him of the novelist Sinclair Ross was published, As For Me and My Body: A Memoir of Sinclair Ross. In it Fraser made public knowledge of Ross's thus-far little-known homosexuality.

== Vocal impairment ==
Fraser suffers from spasmodic dysphonia, a voice disorder caused by involuntary movements of one or more muscles of the voice box that causes the voice to sound stiff and strangled. He has written a memoir of his battles to regain control of his voice called The Voice Gallery.

== Bibliography ==
- 1976: "Norman Douglas and D.H. Lawrence: A Sideshow in Modern Memoirs", The D.H. Lawrence Review, vol. 9, no. 2, pp. 283–295.
- 1982: Taking Cover (Oberon Press) ISBN 0-88750-455-8
- 1985: Foreign Affairs (Stoddart) ISBN 0-7737-5042-8
- 1991: Bad Trips, editor, foreword for collection of anecdotes (Vintage) ISBN 0-394-22151-6
- 1995: Popular Anatomy (Porcupine's Quill) ISBN 0-88984-149-7
- 1996: Telling My Love Lies, with various authors (Porcupine's Quill) ISBN 0-88984-179-9
- 1997: As For Me and My Body: A Memoir of Sinclair Ross (ECW Press) ISBN 1-55022-310-0
- 2002: The Voice Gallery: Travels With a Glass Throat, non-fiction memoir (Thomas Allen) ISBN 0-88762-101-5
- 2005: 13 Ways of Listening to a Stranger (short stories compilation, Thomas Allen) ISBN 0-88762-193-7

== Awards and recognitions ==
- 1985: fiction finalist, Governor General's Awards for Foreign Affairs
- 1986: winner, Ethel Wilson Fiction Prize for Foreign Affairs
- 1995: winner, Books in Canada First Novel Award for Popular Anatomy
- 2003: finalist, Hubert Evans Non-Fiction Prize
