= The Diviners =

1974 novel by Margaret Laurence

- First edition
- Author: Margaret Laurence
- Language: English
- Publisher: McClelland and Stewart
- Publication date: 1974
- Publication place: Canada
- Media type: Print (Paperback and Hardback)
- Pages: 382
- Preceded by: A Bird in the House

The Diviners is a novel by Margaret Laurence. Published by McClelland & Stewart in 1974, it was Laurence's final novel, and the last in her five-volume Manawaka cycle. It is considered a classic of Canadian literature and won the Governor General's Award for Fiction in 1974.

While the tone of the novel is spiritual and life-affirming, it also deals with issues of race, sexuality, class, poverty, and abortion, and contains strong language. As a result, challenges by religious and/or conservative groups have been constant, but these disputes galvanized authors, librarians, teachers, publishers, and booksellers to champion the book, and led to the formation of Freedom to Read Week.

== Plot summary ==
The Diviners follows the story of fictional Canadian novelist, Morag Gunn. Morag's life is believed to be loosely based upon Laurence's personal experiences. Aritha Van Herk argues that when observing all of Laurence's work, it is evident that The Diviners explicitly connects the author's emotions, experiences, and professional development to the protagonist more than any of her other novels.

The novel begins in Morag's rural Ontario cabin. Morag wakes up one morning and finds a note from her daughter, Pique, explaining that she has left home to learn about her Metis heritage. Flashbacks explore Morag's adolescence when she embarked on a similar journey many years ago. As a novelist, Morag also struggles with her writing, and frequently questions her understanding of the world. She contemplates how words can describe the natural environment around her, but struggles without attaining success – she believes that nature is capable of both nurturing life and destroying it, and contemplates the strange duality.

Morag begins to have more flashbacks. She reflects on her traumatic childhood, including the death of her parents who both died from polio, and her transition into a foster care household. Morag's foster parents, Christie and Prin, were of a significantly lower economic standing than her biological parents, and she did not treat them with respect. Christie's eccentric actions ignore social norms, and provides a platform for the novel's critique of socioeconomic class. Morag yearns to leave home, and enrolls in university, moving to Winnipeg where she initiates a relationship with an older professor, Brooke Skelton. Their relationship appears normal, and they are later married.

Skelton begins to verbally abuse Morag, and she begins an affair with fellow Metis and childhood friend, Jules Tonnerre. Morag attempts to become pregnant with Jules, and Pique is conceived. Her marriage with Skelton ends, and she moves to Vancouver to focus on writing.

Morag produces her first novel, and then moves to England. She continues to focus on writing, but must also care for Pique. She becomes lonely and moves back to Canada, where she learns that Christie is dying.

The novel's final section returns to the present. Morag finishes her latest novel, and Pique returns home.

== Characters ==
=== Main characters ===
Morag Gunn – Morag is the principal protagonist in "The Diviners". Laurence told the story from this character's perspective. Morag was born in Manawaka, a fictional town in Manitoba that Laurence based on the one in which she actually lived and worked. Laurence depicted Morag as a fiercely independent and free spirited woman who frequently moves from location to location in search of "home" (e.g., Morag's move to McConnell's Landing). Although Laurence told Morag's story chronologically, the author often interspersed the narrative with episodes from Morag's past, utilizing "Memorybank Movies" that revealed various formative experiences that Morag had while growing up in the prairies.

Morag is interested in stories of old Scottish clans, stemming from her guardian Christie's love of the past. A story that keeps repeating is that of Piper Gunn and Colin “Gunner” Gunn. The latter saved Christie during World War I. Morag also takes inspiration from, and questions the depictions of femininity in, the work of female Canadian authors such as Catharine Parr Traill. She often has silent conversations with herself about these subjects.

Piquette "Pique" Gunn – Piquette is Morag's daughter by Jules Tonnerre. Pique's character arc parallels that of Morag, growing up and exploring the world. Through her character arc Laurence depicts Pique's character as free spirited and fiercely independent, similar to Morag and Jules.

Jules "Skinner" Tonnerre – Jules is a descendant of the Métis people of Canada. Like Morag, Jules is independent and proud of his heritage. He expresses this by composing and performing songs the lyrical content of which often concern his grandfather and Louis Riel. Although Jules grows up in squalor he does not regard either his father or his sisters with animosity. He often takes care of them and, upon their untimely passing, he mourns them. Jules's siblings are Val, Paul, Jacques and Pique, the last of whom is Piquette Gunn's namesake. Later in the novel Jules forms a band with Billy Joe.

Christie Logan – Christie was Morag's guardian while she grew up in Manawaka. He is married to Princess "Prin" Logan. The children of Manawaka refer to him derisively as “the scavenger”. He works at the Manawaka garbage dump, the so-called Nuisance Grounds. Christie is proud of his work, stating that one can learn a lot from what people throw out. Morag writes that the smell of the Nuisance Grounds does not leave Christie. It is an inextricable part of him.

Princess "Prin" Logan – Prin is the overweight adoptive mother of Morag. She is the daughter of a British remittance man, forced to emigrate to Canada. She makes Morag's childhood school clothes. Morag writes that Prin has a high pitched voice and that she is “a born whiner”.

Brooke Skelton – He is Morag's partner in what turns out to be her only marriage and committed relationship. Laurence depicts him as a man in his thirties with greying hair and a professor of 17th Century Literature. Brooke grew up in India and emigrated to Canada. After Morag and Brooke's marriage falters Morag leaves for Vancouver. Brooke eventually remarries. Morag notes his second wife looks much younger than her.

Lazarus Tonnerre – Lazarus, a war veteran, is Jules's abusive father.

Royland – A resident of McConnells Landing, Royland divines for water. He helps Morag by catching pickerel in the river. At the conclusion of the text Royland states that he does not understand the process of divining, that it is a mystery to him, and that he would not divine again.

The Smiths – Thomas and Maudie Smith are Morag's "A-Okay" neighbours. They often ask Morag for her advice on poetry.

=== Minor characters ===
Dr. Paul Cates

Niall Cameron

Lachlan MacLachlan – editor and owner of the local Manawaka newspaper

Simon Pearl and Archie McVitie – Lawyers based around Manawaka

Miss Melrose – From Manwaka College, encourages Morag to write poetry, although Morag notes that she is a bit “grim” (141)

Ella – friend to Morag, marries Mort and has two children.

Gord – Pique's partner

Mrs. Maggie Tefler – short-tempered landlady in Kitsilano, Vancouver. Runs a boarding house that Morag titles “Bleak House” that contains another resident, Old Mr. Johnson

Hank Masterson – representative of Wand Publishing

Milward Crispin – Literary agent

Fan Brady – exotic snakedancer, provides Morag with lodging as she works on her writing.

Carol – Teenage babysitter in Kitsilano, Vancouver

Harold – broadcasters, reads the news, has an affair with Morag

Chas

J. Sampson – bookstore owner, “Agonistes Bookshop” in London, High Street.

Daniel McRaith – Highland Scotsman who meets Morag, has an affair with and later revealed to be a father of seven children with his wife Bridie. Morag accompanies Daniel to Scotland on a symbolic pilgrimage to find out about her clan roots.

Hector Jonas – owner of Jacopina Chapel, funeral home in Manawaka during Christie's funeral.

=== Students from the Manawaka school ===
Stacey Cameron

Mavis Duncan

Julie Kazlik

Ross McVitie

Mike Lobodiak

Al Cates

Steve Kowalski

Jamie Halpern

Eva Winkler – One of the few individuals from Manawaka that Morag likes speaking with, Winkler also takes care of Prin during her later days coping with obesity.

Vanessa MacLeod – a reference to Laurence's separate work, “A bird in the house” where she explores the lives of the MacLeod family. Laurence's interest is in the prairie literature and how life functions within the vastness of the Canadian landscape.

== Genre and style ==
Critics have argued that The Diviners is a künstlerroman (a novel that follows the growth and development of an artist, like James Joyce's A Portrait of the Artist as a Young Man). According to Nora Stovel, Laurence uses three methods to dramatize Morag's creative development: "first, she employs a tripartite educational model of reading, critiquing, and writing. Moreover, she includes mentors – Christie Logan, Miss Melrose, and Brooke Skelton – who teach Morag to read and write. Most important, she embeds Morag's fictions in the narrative to illustrate her literary development". In addition to being a künstlerroman, the Diviners is metafiction, as it dramatizes Morag's internal and external life as a writer. This is evident in the way Laurence frames the novel with “images of Morag, the writer, seated at her kitchen table in front of the window, overlooking the river, trying to write, in the Now of the novel”. These images dominate the frame sections of the novel – the first section, River of Now and Then, and the last section, The Diviners. Stovel notes that Morag reflects Laurence herself, and that she gives the reader a glimpse into her creative process through her focal character. Hence the metafictional elements of the novel can also be read as self-reflexive, as they reflect Laurence writing her novel in her cabin on the Otonabee River.

According to scholar Brenda Beckman-Long, genre and gender are intricately linked in The Diviners, and the novel is "a hybrid of realism, autobiographical and confessional genres" that combine "to establish the authority of a female perspective". She considers the ending of the novel, which suggests that Morag's life story has come to an end as the novel reaches its conclusion, and reads the text as an autobiography. Further supporting this point are the numerous interior monologues that pervade the novel. For Beckman-Long, these passages are reminiscent of narration in a film, and she cites a specific line from the novel: "A popular misconception is that we can’t change the past – everyone is constantly changing their own past, recalling it, revising it”. Aside from these autobiographical elements, Laurence also employs literary realism, which is evidenced by her "ostensibly objective third-person narrator". These techniques are blended to create Morag's life story.

The Manawaka Cycle is part of a Canadian modernist movement, and thus many of Laurence's novels make use of modernist techniques. In The Diviners, Laurence eschews linearity, and the text shifts through time and space to produce the effect of simultaneity. As a literary technique, simultaneity is characterized by the “concurrent presentation of elements from different places, multiple points-of-view, [and] radically disconnected segments of time". For instance, the opening section of The Diviners, titled River of Now and Then,suggests "two levels of narrative" and conveys the simultaneity of past and present. (This is also demonstrated in the novel's opening line: "The river flowed both ways".) Throughout the novel, past and present interweave; they are irrevocably connected so that the reader's sense of time is distorted. Finally, critic Richard Lane brings in the issue of gender, and argues that the novel “foregrounds simultaneity as a major component of écriture féminine, the protagonist Morag Gunn and her Métis daughter shifting the focus of the cycle to class, ethnicity and history".

== Themes ==
=== Women and Self-Discovery ===
As scholar Sumathy Swamy articulates, "Laurence's Manawaka novels The Stone Angel (1964), A Jest of God (1966), The Fire Dwellers (1969), and The Diviners (1974)...[have] given remarkable portraits of women fighting with their personal determination through self-assessment to find significant prototypes in their lives. Her characters, in the opening of the novels, might be victims but by the end they refuse to become victimized." Swamy goes onto describe that Laurence's main character, Morag, "searches for her identity as a woman, mother and writer and as an individual in a community." For example, Morag learns about her sexual identity, realizing that "in lovemaking...touch is significantly more meaningful for Morag than sight and speech."

Race and Post-Colonialism

Robert D. Chambers writes that "Morag dares to love across racial lines, and it may be this aspect, rather than anything else, which has made The Diviners so controversial within Canada." Morag is a white-Canadian, while her lover, and Pique's father, is Métis. Neil ten Kortenaar claims that The Diviners is a post-colonial novel, two possible reasons being that "it is a rejection of England and English literature in favour of a native tradition based on orality; and it is a celebration of creolization, the blending of different cultures in an indigenous mix." When Morag and Jules unite and Morag gives birth to Pique, the result "is a child who carries in her veins the blood of both settlers and indigenes. Pique Tonnerre Gunn's inheritance is cultural as well as genetic. Her mother passes on to her the stories of both sides of the racial divide."

Language Redefined

Christl Verduyn argues that "The Diviners comprises a movement 'against language.' By probing words' meanings, and by devices such as the use of 'memory bank movies' and photographs, Laurence includes an interrogation of language and of writing itself. This allows the novel to question itself as a 'formed/formal language.' In this way, The Diviners participates in the critical examination of literature and language carries out in recent years by feminist literary theory." For Verdyun, language in this novel is "a source and vehicle of contradiction." For example, Christie's misuse of language aims to expose "social inauthenticity and counterfeit language" and Morag is both "attracted to and at the same time would like to reject his particular diction."

== Reception and legacy ==
In a Kirkus review from 1974, The Diviners is described as one of Laurence's "least effective novels," and "generally too crowded and warmed over." Other sources, focusing on the inclusion of Canadian "socio-cultural engagements", state that the novel is "widely considered to be Laurence's masterpiece, and one of the greatest Canadian novels ever written."

A filmed adaptation of the book aired on CBC Television in 1993.

The book is noted in a 1994 Globe and Mail article as "[c]ritically acclaimed but sexually explicit" alongside complaints from parents seeking to have the book banned from high schools in the Peterborough County Board of Education. Repeated mentions of the "salty language" and questionable content have followed the novel since its publication in 1974 through to the current time period. Yet, it is also praised for its acknowledgement of important social issue, including the after effects of colonialism, single motherhood, interracial relations, and the relationship between parent and child.

More recent discussion of the novel liken its relevance in the 2000s to aging rather than being considered a dated work of literature.

== See also ==
- List of banned books
