= The Stone Angel =

Book by Margaret Laurence

- First edition
- Author: Margaret Laurence
- Publisher: McClelland and Stewart
- Publication date: June 15, 1964
- Pages: 308
- OCLC: 365801

The Stone Angel is a novel by the Canadian writer Margaret Laurence. First published in 1964 by McClelland and Stewart, it is perhaps the best-known of Laurence's series of five novels set in the fictitious town of Manawaka, Manitoba. In parallel narratives set in the past and the present-day (early 1960s), The Stone Angel tells the story of Hagar Currie Shipley. In the present, 90-year-old Hagar struggles against being put in a nursing home, which she sees as a symbol of death. This narrative alternates with Hagar looking back at her life.

== Plot summary ==
In a series of vignettes, The Stone Angel tells the story of Hagar Shipley, a 90-year-old woman struggling to come to grips with a life of intransigence and loss. The themes of pride and the prejudice that comes from social class recur in the novel. As a young girl she refuses to rock her dying brother in the garments of their mother. As a young woman she marries Bram Shipley against her father's wishes, severing the family ties. She shows favouritism towards her younger son, John. After Hagar separates from her husband, Hagar takes John with her. However, he ultimately returns to his father. When John dies, Hagar does not cry, and at that point, she turns into a "Stone Angel". Later in life, her elder son Marvin is shown to have been the good and loyal son all along, despite the lack of his mother's favour. It is he at the age of 64 along with his wife Doris who takes care of her. As a 90-year-old woman, Hagar goes on an unexpected adventure into the woods alone. Given her age, there is an overtone that this event will be the last chapter of her life. In the woods, she meets another wanderer. The two have a bonding conversation, where Hagar finally opens up. A lifetime of buried emotion comes out, and she finally cries. The next day the police and Marvin come to rescue Hagar from the woods. In an act of love and repentance, she confesses to Marvin that he was the better son. She dies of cancer at the end of the novel.

== Literary significance and criticism ==
Amongst other titles by Laurence, The Stone Angel is consistently listed as one of the greatest Canadian novels ever written.

The novel has often been a part of school and university curricula. In the 1970s and 1980s, some Canadian school boards were pressured to ban her novels, including The Stone Angel.

== Recognition and adaptations ==
James W. Nichol adapted The Stone Angel first for radio and then for stage. The radio drama, which premiered in 1989, was broadcast in six parts on CBC Radio's Morningside (and later released as an audiobook). The stage play premiered in 1991 at the Blyth Festival under the direction of Brian Richmond and starring Barbara Chilcott as Hagar. Nichol's play has subsequently been performed in 1993 with Theatre Passe Muraille under the direction of Maureen White, by the Canadian Stage Company in 1999, and by the King's Town Players in 2014, among others.

The Stone Angel was one of the selected books in the 2002 edition of Canada Reads, where it was championed by Leon Rooke.

In 2007, it was adapted into a movie, The Stone Angel, filmed in Winnipeg and Hartney, Manitoba. The film stars Ellen Burstyn, Dylan Baker, Elliot Page and Kevin Zegers.
