= Doreen Brownstone =

Canadian actress (1922–2022)

Doreen Brownstone OM
- Born: Doreen Stein; 28 September 1922; Leeds, England, UK
- Died: 16 December 2022 (aged 100)
- Occupation: Actress
- Years active: 1974–2018
- Spouse: Billy Brownstone
- Children: 3

Doreen Brownstone OM (née Stein; 28 September 1922 – 16 December 2022) was a British-born Canadian actress, based in Winnipeg, Manitoba.

== Biography ==
Brownstone was born on 28 September 1922, and was a mainstay of the Winnipeg theatre and television scene. In 1941, she quit her job to join the Royal Air Force during WWII, where she started acting after an official asked her to be in a play. She moved to Winnipeg as a war bride in 1946, and, in 1958, starred opposite Gordon Pinsent in the very first production at the very first regional theatre in North America (Hatful of Rain at Royal Manitoba Theatre Centre, directed by John Hirsch).

As head of Television at CBC, Hirsch also cast Brownstone regularly in the popular soap opera House of Pride.

In 2013, Brownstone received the Lifetime Achievement Award from the Winnipeg Arts Council. In 2017, she was appointed a Member of the Order of Manitoba (OM).

Brownstone turned 100 on 28 September 2022, and died on 16 December.

== Filmography ==
- The Stone Angel (2007)
- What If God Were the Sun? (2007)
- High Life (2009)
- Foodland (2010)
- Silent Night (2012)
