= Theatre Canada =

- Also known as: Canadian Short Stories
- Genre: Anthology
- Country of origin: Canada
- Original language: English
- No. of seasons: 1
- No. of episodes: 13

Production
- Executive producer: Ronald Weyman
- Producer: David Peddie
- Running time: 30 minutes

Original release
- Network: CBC Television
- Release: 17 September – 10 December 1970

Theatre Canada, subtitled Canadian Short Stories, is a Canadian drama television series that aired on CBC Television in 1970.

== Premise ==
This series adapted various Canadian fictional works for broadcast.

CBC management originally intended to combine this series with the experimental production Program X to form a common Theatre Canada series despite the radically different concepts of each production. However, the Dominion Drama Festival intended to rename itself Theatre Canada and objected to CBC's plan. Theatre Canada was subtitled Canadian Short Stories. This series aired Thursday evenings until December 1971 when its time slot began carrying Program X.

== Scheduling ==
This half-hour series was broadcast on Thursdays at 9:00 p.m. (North American Eastern time) from 17 September to 10 December 1970.

== Episodes ==
- 17 September 1970: "Very Special Shoes" (Morley Callaghan story, Gloria Lyndon adaptation, René Bonnière director), featuring Barbara Hamilton and Jodi Farber
- 24 September 1970: "In Exile" (David Helwig story, Peter Carter adaptation and director), featuring Chris Wiggins
- 1 October 1970: "Postcard" (Alice Munro story, David Peddie adaptation, René Bonnière director), featuring Linda Goranson
- 8 October 1970: "In The Promised Land" (Pamela Andress writer, Anna Reiser adaptation, René Bonniere director), featuring Vladimir Valenta
- 15 October 1970: "Rigmarole" (Morley Callaghan story, Bryan Barney adaptation, Peter Carter director), featuring Donnelly Rhodes and Margot Kidder
- 22 October 1970: "Father And Son" (Morley Callaghan story, James W. Nichol adaptation, Al Waxman director), featuring Len Birman and Patricia Collins
- 29 October 1970: "Something for Olivia's Scrapbook" (David Helwig story, Carol Bolt adaptation, Rene Bonniere director), featuring Tudi Wiggins
- 5 November 1970: "The Mariposa Bank Mystery" (Stephen Leacock story), featuring David Brown, Tedde Moore and Mavor Moore
- 12 November 1970: "God's Sparrow" (Philip Child writer, Peter Carter director), set in World War I
- 19 November 1970: "A Token Gesture" (David French writer)
- 26 November 1970: "Some Are So Lucky" (Hugh Garner story), featuring Jackie Burroughs and Michael Tait
- 3 December 1970: "The Magic Hat" (Morley Callaghan writer), featuring Gordon Pinsent and Louise Marleau
- 10 December 1970: "Roberta And Her Robot" (Richard J. Needham writer), featuring Anne Collings, Jack Creley, and Dinah Christie
