= As for Me and My House =

1941 novel by Sinclair Ross

As For Me and My House
- First edition cover
- Author: Sinclair Ross
- Language: English
- Genre: Novel
- Publisher: Reynal and Hitchcock
- Publication date: 1941
- Publication place: Canada

As For Me and My House is a novel by Canadian author Sinclair Ross, first published in 1941 by the American company Reynal and Hitchcock, with little fanfare. Its 1957 Canadian re-issue, by McClelland & Stewart, as part of their New Canadian Library line, began its canonization, mostly in university classrooms. Set during the Great Depression in the fictional mid-western prairie town of Horizon (the precise location of Horizon is not provided, and could conceivably be in either Canada or the United States), it deals with the experiences of a minister's wife, her husband and their struggles and hardships.

== Plot summary ==
Mrs. Bentley, a Protestant minister's wife, writes journal (or diary) entries on a regular basis; the time span is just over a year (from 8 April 1939 to 12 May 1940, if the weekday noted with each entry is assumed to be correct). The couple has just moved to yet another small town, "Horizon". Mrs. Bentley, whose first name we never learn, despairs of Philip (her husband), who is becoming ever more remote. As she records her feelings, it is clear she, as she suspects of her husband, has nothing but contempt for her husband's flock. Mrs. Bentley sees herself and Philip as frustrated artists; she has a passion for music and, in her youth, entertained dreams of success as a pianist, and he spends much of his time sketching and painting.

Her journal tells mostly of her efforts to win her husband's affections, yet he appears to withstand her efforts, which are conflicted and subtly evasive. She strikes up a friendship with Paul, a local schoolteacher and philologist, while Philip engages the affections of Judith. They attempt to adopt a Catholic child, Steve, who seems to fulfil Philip's desire for a child that Mrs. Bentley cannot apparently deliver, but this arrangement falls apart. Eventually, putatively under pressure from an increasingly hostile congregation, they prepare to move to a city. However, it is plain that the congregation and town are nothing like as philistine as Mrs. Bentley insists—neighbourhood boys admiringly lurk outside the manse listening to her practise the piano and the audience for her recital in the church hall is vastly appreciative—but Mrs. Bentley is unmoved in her contempt for them and scornful of their applause for her bravura piano performance. Assuming that they are moving to a mid-sized prairie city in the middle of the Great Depression, Mrs. Bentley's dream of establishing a second-hand bookstore there as a means of escape from their unappealing life in a small town is patently absurd. Judith, who mysteriously has become pregnant, dies shortly after giving birth and the Bentleys adopt her child.

== Characters ==
Mrs. Bentley - a Protestant minister's wife
Rev. Philip Bentley - her husband, the reserved minister
Steve - the Catholic child temporarily adopted by the Bentleys
Mr. Kulanich, his hard-working immigrant father, probably from Romania
Paul Kirby - the local schoolteacher and philologist
Judith West - a young woman who befriends the Bentleys
Not named "Philip" - Judith West and Philip Bentley's illegitimate child
Mrs. Finley - a leader among the women in Horizon
George and Stanley - Mrs. Finley's brutal sons
Mrs. Wenderby - a prominent member of the community
Mrs. Ellingson - a friendly neighbour of Norwegian origin
Josephine Bird - the wife of the local doctor
Stanley Kirby - Paul's brother, at whose ranch the Bentleys stay for a short vacation
Laura Kirby - Stanley's rancher wife
Annie - Metis maid at ranch
Joe Lawson - farmer in nearby village

The town of Horizon is populated by an Anglo majority, and minority groups from Scandinavia and Eastern Europe. Its community betrays a social stratification along ethnic lines typical of the region. At the top stratum of society there are well-off middle-class families of British origin and Protestant belief that operate their own businesses in town. At the bottom there is the immigrant underclass of unskilled railway labourers including Steve Kulanich's father. In between there are foreign-born settlers like Mr. and Mrs. Sven Ellingson, the Norwegian neighbours of the Bentleys, or country-bred people like Paul Kirby and Judith West, who have come to town for work.

== Literary significance and reception ==
Claims have been made about its significance, including M&S's own claim in 1957 that this book was a "classic." Although the novel experienced poor initial sales in 1941, its courted ambiguity and classically unreliable narrator make it an object for boundless speculation and argument.

As For Me And My House is popularly thought of (and studied) as a Canadian novel, as it was written by a Canadian author, but there is nothing in the novel that definitively states that either the setting or the characters are Canadian, and "Horizon" could conceivably located in one of the Canadian prairie provinces OR in any number of northern US states such as Minnesota, Nebraska, North Dakota, South Dakota, etc. The 1939-40 dating lends further weight to the idea that "Horizon" is somewhere in the US, as Canada entered WWII in September 1939, which would have placed considerable strain on any Canadian community (and the war and its effects on the community would surely have been noted in any Canadian diary of the time). However, as the US did not enter the war until December 1941, it is quite plausible that an American diary of 1939-40 would have had no mention of WWII and its effects.

Despite this, Paul Denham's 1980 summary of the novel states:

There are some very good reasons why the novel has come to be so important to the Canadian tradition. It is a study of the failed artistic imagination, and of an eroding puritanism; it is also ... a good example of Frye's concept of the garrison mentality, in its exploration of the peculiarities of the Canadian experience of nature and its relation to civilization. It is, then, a powerfully mythical novel in which many of the characteristic themes and attitudes of Canadian literature are sharply focused. Also, the patterns of imagery through which much of the novel's meaning is conveyed are densely and carefully worked... If we approach the novel as a poem, through its imagery, or as a model for the Canadian identity, we are likely to find it a very important work indeed.

== Publication details ==
- 1941, US, Reynal & Hitchcock, Pub date 1941, hardback (First edition)
- 1957, Canada, McClelland & Stewart, Pub date 1957, paperback; reprinted since, by M&S, U of Nebraska
