= Winnipeg Jewish Theatre =

Canadian theatre (founded 1987)

Winnipeg Jewish Theatre is a theatre based in Winnipeg, Manitoba, Canada. It was founded in 1987 and is the only professional theatre in Canada dedicated to Jewish themes.

The theatre's mandate is to present professional theatre of high artistic quality that reflects the Jewish experience of the past, present and future; to encourage the creation of new Canadian plays of Jewish interest; to encourage the development and participation of Canadian playwrights, performers, production personnel; and to promote a better understanding of Jewish culture in the community at large.
