= A Bird in the House =

Book by Margaret Laurence

first edition (publ. McClelland & Stewart)

A Bird in the House, first published in 1970, is a short story sequence written by Margaret Laurence. Noted by Laurence to be "semi-autobiographical", the series chronicles the growing up of a young agnostic writer, Vanessa MacLeod, in the fictional town of Manawaka, Manitoba. A Bird in the House was written from the perspective of Vanessa at age forty, while she recalls her childhood (with the exception of the final chapter Jericho's Brick Battlements, when she revisits her childhood home). It is therefore impossible to tell if young Vanessa was truly able to understand the events unfolding around her, or if she gained that understanding later in life. Originally published as a series of independent short stories,

== Main characters ==
Vanessa MacLeod: The protagonist, various ages throughout the novel. The character is a middle-aged woman who uses flashback to reveal lessons learned from her family as she grows up.

Beth MacLeod, Vanessa's mother: Beth is a former nurse, as it is revealed in Chapter 3, "The Mask of the Bear". Now that she has children, she is a homemaker and peacemaker. She avoids conflict, especially with her hot-tempered father. She has a close relationship with her sister, Edna.

Ewen MacLeod, Vanessa's father: A doctor, like his father. He is unable to make money to support the family during the great depression, a time when people often pay him in chicken and potatoes. His father-in-law, Timothy Connor, often criticizes him for this lack of wealth. He was a soldier during World War I, and witnessed the death of his younger brother Roderick.

Roderick MacLeod, Vanessa's younger brother: Born in Chapter 2, "To Set Our House In Order". He is named after Ewen's brother, who died in World War I.

Edna Connor: Beth's sister, Vanessa's maternal aunt. A light-hearted and beautiful but troubled woman. She lives with her parents until she is twenty-eight, cooking and cleaning, unable to find a job and unwilling to marry simply for escape.

Timothy Connor: Vanessa's maternal grandfather. He is married to Agnes Connor, and they have several adult children. Two of them are his daughters, Beth and Edna. He is a prejudiced, gruff, impatient, unsympathetic, demanding, complaining person, who constantly criticizes.

Agnes Connor: Vanessa's maternal grandmother. Quiet, religious, unfailingly kind and calm.

Dan Connor: Timothy Connor's brother, Vanessa's great uncle.

Grandmother MacLeod: Vanessa's paternal grandmother. A conservative woman who is unable to accept the family's change in circumstances. She behaves as if the family is still wealthy, ordering fancy linens and silver from catalogues

== Publication history ==
A Bird in The House has been reprinted multiple times. A new edition was issued by McClelland & Stewart as part of the New Canadian Library in January 2010.
