= Harrison Bergeron (film) =

1995 American TV movie by Bruce Pittman

- Film poster
- Genre: Science fiction
- Based on: Harrison Bergeron by Kurt Vonnegut
- Written by: Arthur Crimm; Jon Glascoe (uncredited)
- Directed by: Bruce Pittman
- Starring: Sean Astin; Christopher Plummer; Eugene Levy; Miranda de Pencier; Howie Mandel
- Theme music composer: Louis Natale
- Countries of origin: United States; Canada
- Original language: English

Production
- Producers: Jon Glascoe; Jonathan Hackett; Joseph Pierson
- Cinematography: Michael Storey
- Editor: Ion Webster
- Running time: 99 minutes
- Production company: Atlantis Films

Original release
- Network: Showtime
- Release: August 13, 1995

Harrison Bergeron is a science fiction television movie film loosely adapted from Kurt Vonnegut's 1961 dystopian short story of the same name. It was produced for Showtime and first screened on August 13, 1995. It was released to VHS in 1998.

== Plot ==
Harrison Bergeron lives in the fictional suburban town of Madison, Rhode Island in the year 2053. The audience is told that after the second American Revolution, which started during an ongoing economic depression that was a result of a combination of technological advancement and a widening disparity between the very rich and the very poor, it was mandated that all people be equal in all things. To this end, the social norm of this society has become dystopian egalitarianism. Citizens are pushed to strive to be of equal wealth, intelligence, athletic prowess and social status to all around them. Through a process of selective breeding, mankind is perfecting the perfectly average human being. What is not accomplished through arranged marriages is made up for through technological means, the most prominent of which are showing only mind numbing TV shows, and a headband device worn by all citizens which modulates intelligence, dialing a person's IQ up or down in order to arrive at a "perfect" 100.

There are limits to the success of the devices, however, and Harrison Bergeron is one such case. He is a total failure in school, consistently receiving A's (C is the desired grade). Even though he has been held back four years and his headband is consistently modified to dampen his intelligence, he still continues to excel to the embarrassment of him and his family.

Harrison goes to see a doctor about his intelligence problem, and after several tests it is determined that the headband is unsuccessful because Harrison's synaptic connections reroute themselves after each adjustment in order to overcome the inhibitions the headband is designed to place on the thought process. He is told that he will have to have an operation akin to a lobotomy in order to permanently lower his intelligence.

In his last day with a fully functioning brain, he goes to a "head house", where, in a parody of a bordello, men make plans to make high-end educational conversation with exceptionally smart women. Illegal device-free women are paid to play chess and conduct intelligent conversations with the clients. His first intelligent conversation ever with "mind whore" Phillipa is interrupted by a police bust. While the raid on the police station is underway Phillipa addresses a hidden camera saying not to take him away, and that she likes him. While being held captive in the police station, he is approached by a special agent who offers him an alternative to the lobotomy - to join what turns out to be the secret elite that runs the government.

Harrison falls in love with Phillipa there, but he illegally impregnates her and she is lobotomized for trying to escape. He feels he can no longer continue to betray his values and decides to take action. He breaks into a TV studio and reveals the truth about the secret society to the viewers. Eventually, the guards break through, and later on he is forced to make an appearance on TV and pretend the broadcast was not real. Instead, he uses his chance to commit suicide by shooting himself in front of the viewers. The story is framed by an additional perspective from Bergeron's parents, who are watching the incident on TV, but who, because of his father's handicapping due to his superior intelligence and his mother's less than average intelligence, cannot concentrate enough to appreciate what occurs nor remember it.

In a final scene, a young boy and his friend get together in his bedroom to watch the first four hours of Bergeron's broadcast, without their bands. Downstairs, one boy's mother looks up the stairs with a look of recognition on her face; she is seen to be Phillipa.

== Cast ==
- Sean Astin as Harrison Bergeron
- Miranda de Pencier as Phillipa
- Eugene Levy as President McCloskey
- Mairlyn Smith as Janet Mckloskey
- Howie Mandel as Charlie (of 'Chat with Charlie')
- Andrea Martin as Diana Moon Glampers
- Christopher Plummer as John Klaxon
- Nigel Bennett as Dr. Eisenstock
- Peter Boretski as Newman
- David Calderisi as Commissioner Benson
- Emmanuelle Chriqui as Jeannie
- Hayden Christensen as Eric
- Cindy Cook as Weatherperson
- Roger Dunn as George Bergeron
- Jayne Eastwood as Ms. Newbound
- Hal Eisen as TV Announcer—San Quentin
- Matthew Ferguson as Garth Bergeron
- Michael Fletcher as Technician
- John Friesen as Frank the Plumber
- Linda Goranson as Hazel Bergeron
- Richard Monette as Eric Shockley
- Quyen Hua as Wang

== Production and release ==
Harrison Bergeron was filmed in Toronto, Ontario, Canada and the University of Toronto Scarborough campus.

== Awards ==
Harrison Bergeron was nominated in four categories at the 1996 Gemini Awards for Best Direction, Best Performance by an Actor in a Supporting Role, Best Production Design or Art Direction and Best Sound.
