= Manawaka =

Manawaka is a fictional town in the Canadian province of Manitoba, frequently used as a setting in novels and short stories by Margaret Laurence. The town was based on Laurence's real-life hometown of Neepawa, and should not be confused with the real-life town of Maniwaki, Quebec. The town is also used in Daniel Poliquin's novel L'écureuil noir.

The Manawaka sequence consists of the books The Stone Angel, A Jest of God, The Fire-Dwellers, A Bird in the House, and The Diviners.
