= James W. Nichol =

Canadian playwright and novelist

James W. Nichol (born 1940 in Toronto, Ontario) is a Canadian playwright and novelist.

== Awards and residencies ==
His first novel, Midnight Cab (2002), won the Arthur Ellis Award for Best First Novel, and was shortlisted for the CWA Gold Dagger. He was also shortlisted for the Arthur Ellis Award for Best Novel in 2009. He was the vice-president of Playwrights Guild of Canada and was playwright-in-residence at the National Art Centre.

== Personal life ==
Nichol lives in Stratford, Ontario.

== Bibliography ==
=== Plays ===
- Tub (1969)
- Sweet Home Sweet (1972)
- The Book of Solomon Spring (1972)
- Gwendoline (1978)
- Child (1979)
- Sonny (1982)
- Relative Strangers (1983)
- When I Wake (1984)
- The Three True Loves of Jasmine Hoover (1986)
- The Stone Angel (adapted from Margaret Laurence's The Stone Angel) (1995)
- Dr. Jeckyll and Mr. Hyde: A Love Story (1995–1996)

=== Novels ===
- Midnight Cab (2002)
- Death Spiral (2013)
- Transgression (2013)
