= A Jest of God =

1966 novel by Canadian author Margaret Laurence

- First edition (publ. McClelland & Stewart)
- Author: Margaret Laurence
- Publisher: McClelland & Stewart
- Publication date: January 1, 1966
- Award: Governor General's Award for English-language fiction (1966)

A Jest of God is a novel by the Canadian author Margaret Laurence. It was first published in 1966. It won the 1966 Governor General's Award for English-language fiction, and was made into the 1968 Paul Newman/Joanne Woodward film Rachel, Rachel.

== Synopsis ==
The novel follows schoolteacher Rachel Cameron through a summer affair and its consequences on her life. Although Rachel is in her 30s, the book serves to document a second adolescence as she comes to recognize herself as the adult to her aging mother.

A Jest of God was adapted to the 1968 movie Rachel, Rachel, starring Joanne Woodward and directed by Paul Newman. The film was nominated for four Academy Awards in 1969, including Best Picture.
