= Sinclair Ross =

Canadian banker and writer (1908–1996)

- Born: James Sinclair Ross; January 22, 1908 near Shellbrook, Saskatchewan, Canada
- Died: February 29, 1996 (aged 88); Vancouver, British Columbia, Canada
- Resting place: Indian Head, Saskatchewan, Canada
- Occupations: banker, author
- Writing career
- Language: English
- Genre: fiction
- Subject: Canadian prairies
- Notable work: As For Me and My House
- Notable awards: Order of Canada

James Sinclair Ross, CM (January 22, 1908 – February 29, 1996) was a Canadian banker and author, who wrote novels and short fiction about life on the Canadian Prairies. He is best known for his first novel, As For Me and My House.

== Life and career ==
Ross was born on a homestead near Shellbrook, Saskatchewan. When he was seven, his parents separated, and he lived with his mother on a number of different farms during his childhood, going to school in Indian Head, Saskatchewan. He left school after Grade 11 and in 1924 he joined the Union Bank of Canada, which became part of the Royal Bank of Canada a year later. At first, he worked in a number of small towns in Saskatchewan, then moved to Winnipeg, Manitoba, in 1933 where he wrote and published his most famous novel As For Me and My House. In 1946, he moved to Montreal, Quebec, after spending four years in the Canadian Army during World War II. He remained with the Royal Bank until his retirement in 1968, after which he spent some time in Spain and Greece before moving to a nursing home in Vancouver, British Columbia, where he lived until his death.

As For Me and My House, set in an isolated town on the Prairies during the Great Depression, was published in 1941. At first not much noticed, it went on to become a Canadian literary classic and set the precedent for the genre of Canadian prairie fiction. He wrote three more novels during his lifetime, as well as a few anthologies of short stories, none of which became as well known as his first novel. He is known to have destroyed manuscripts of novels that his publisher rejected, including a sequel to Sawbones Memorial.

His short story "The Painted Door" was adapted by Atlantis Films as the short film The Painted Door, which was an Academy Award nominee for Best Live Action Short Film at the 57th Academy Awards in 1985.

A monument in his honour has been erected in Indian Head by Saskatchewan artists and readers, with a bronze statue sculpted by Joe Fafard.

In 1992, he was made a Member of the Order of Canada. He died in 1996, having had Parkinson's disease, and was buried in Indian Head. The year after his death his homosexuality became public knowledge for the first time, as a result of Keath Fraser's biography As For Me and My Body: A Memoir of Sinclair Ross (1997).

== Bibliography ==
=== Novels ===
- As For Me and My House (1941)
- The Well (1958)
- Whir of Gold (1970)
- Sawbones Memorial (1974)

=== Short stories ===
- The Lamp at Noon and other stories. Queen's Quarterly, 1938; reed. 1968; reed. McClelland and Stewart, 1988; reed. Penguin Modern Classics, 2018
  - "One's a Heifer"
  - "The Painted Door"
    - in German: Die frisch gestrichene Tür, in Kanada erzählt. Transl. Walter E. Riedel. Fischer Taschenbuch 10930, Francfort 1992, pp. 9–32
  - "The Lamp at Noon".
    - in German: Die Lampe am Mittag, in Kanadische Erzähler der Gegenwart. Transl. Walter E. Riedel. Manesse, Zurich 1986, pp. 339–358; and in Die weite Reise. Kanadische Erzählungen und Kurzgeschichten. Transl. Karl Heinrich. Volk und Welt, Berlin 1974, pp. 103–117
  - "Cornet At Night"
    - In 1963 the National Film Board of Canada produced a 15-minute film based on the story.
    - In 1983, Bruce Pittman directed a television film based on the story.
  - "A Field of Wheat"
  - "A Day with Pegasus"
  - "Nell"
  - "The Outlaw"
