= Margaret Laurence =

Canadian novelist and short story writer

Margaret Laurence CC
- Born: Jean Margaret Wemyss; July 18, 1926; Neepawa, Manitoba, Canada
- Died: January 5, 1987 (aged 60); Lakefield, Ontario, Canada
- Resting place: Neepawa Cemetery
- Education: United College (BA, 1947)
- Occupations: Novelist; short story writer; essayist
- Children: 2
- Writing career
- Pen name: Steve Lancaster
- Language: English
- Genres: Literary fiction; Children's literature
- Notable works: The Stone Angel; A Jest of God; The Diviners
- Notable awards: Governor General's Award for English-language fiction (1966, 1974); Molson Prize (1975)

Jean Margaret Laurence CC (née Wemyss; July 18, 1926 – January 5, 1987) was a Canadian novelist and short story writer, and is one of the major figures in Canadian literature. She was also a founder of the Writers' Trust of Canada, a non-profit literary organization that seeks to encourage Canada's writing community.

== Early life ==
Margaret Laurence was born Jean Margaret Wemyss in Neepawa, Manitoba, on July 18, 1926. Known as Peggy during her childhood, she was the daughter of Robert Harrison Wemyss and Verna Jean Simpson. Her mother died when she was four. Her father later married her mother's sister, Margaret Campbell Simpson, known as Maggie, who was a teacher and librarian. The new couple adopted a son, Robert Morrison Wemyss, born in May 1933. Her father died two years later in 1935. Peggy was nine.

Following the death of her father, Peggy and her family moved into her maternal grandfather's house on First Avenue in Neepawa.

At 18, she left Neepawa to attend United College in Winnipeg, now the University of Winnipeg.

== Education ==
Before attending United College, Laurence applied for academic scholarships that were granted based on her academic record and financial need.

Another of Laurence's achievements during her first year of college was being welcomed into the English Club, an organization of senior students who discussed poetry, led by professor Arthur L. Phelps.

This was her first time being around peers who were also passionate about literature, and it was an opportunity for her to expand her knowledge as both scholar and writer. "Tony's", a part-cafeteria, part-coffee shop in the basement of United College, was another important place for Laurence to share her literary interests with colleagues. She met with friends and discussed literature; those who were writers shared their works with the group.

Laurence continued to write throughout university, publishing poetry in the student newspaper, The Manitoban. Her first submissions appeared under the pseudonym "Steve Lancaster." Later, she used "J. M. Wemyss." Both times, the pen name was meant to conceal her gender. Looking back in her memoir, Dance on the Earth, she regretted the choice, but connected it to the dismissive attitudes towards female writers of the time.

In her final year, she became an associate editor of Vox, United College's literary journal, and served as publicity president of the student council. By the end of her undergraduate years, she had published at least 18 poems, three short stories and a critical essay.

During this period Laurence became associated with the Christian socialist movement known as the Social Gospel, which remained important to her for the remainder of her life.

Laurence graduated with a Bachelor of Arts in English Literature in 1947.

== Marriage and children ==
Laurence married John Fergus ("Jack") Laurence, a civil engineer, on September 13, 1947, the year of her graduation. The couple lived in England before moving to British Somaliland in 1950, where Jack worked as an engineer. Their first child, Jocelyn, was born in England in 1952. Later that year, they moved to Accra in the Gold Coast (now Ghana). Their second child, David, was born there in 1955. She returned to Canada with her family in 1957 and settled in Vancouver.

The couple separated in five years later, in 1962. Laurence moved to England with the children while Jack went to Pakistan. In her memoir, Dance on the Earth, she recalls worrying about the effects on the children and how she would support herself as a single mother, though Jack did provide an allowance towards their care. Their divorce was finalized in 1969.

== Career ==
=== Early journalism ===
Laurence's first reporting job came while still in high-school, working for the Neepawa Press in the summer of 1943. Her English teacher, Mildred Musgrove, encouraged her writing and offered support and criticism.

After graduating from United College in 1947, Laurence joined The Westerner, a Communist weekly in Winnipeg. While there, Laurence wrote 15 signed articles for the paper that year, including a report on a train wreck and fire outside the city. Her byline also appeared in the first issue of a daily newspaper, the Winnipeg Citizen, on March 1, 1948. She covered labour news, reviewed books, and wrote a radio column called "In the Air" during her time there. Laurence left the Citizen in 1948 after its managing editor accused her of being a Communist.

=== Literary career ===
One of Canada's most esteemed and beloved authors by the end of her literary career, Laurence began writing short stories in her teenage years while in Neepawa. Her first published piece "The Land of Our Father" was submitted to a competition held by the Winnipeg Free Press.

This story contains the first appearance of the name "Manawaka" (a fictional Canadian town used in many of her later works).

It was after her return to Canada in 1957 that she wrote The Stone Angel (1964), the novel for which she is best known. Set in a fictional Manitoba small town named Manawaka, the story is narrated by 90-year-old Hagar Shipley, alternating between her present moments and recollections of her entire life. The novel was for a time required reading in many North American school systems and colleges.

Laurence wrote four more works of fiction set in Manawaka. Laurence was published by the Canadian publishing company McClelland and Stewart, and she became one of the key figures in the emerging Canadian literature tradition.

=== Africa ===
During her time in British Somaliland, Laurence began collecting and translating Somali poems and folktales. She later wrote about witnessing efforts to drill for water and the lives of Somalis and foreign residents in her memoir The Prophet's Camel Bell (1963). After moving to Accra in 1952, Laurence published her Somali translations as A Tree for Poverty: Somali Poetry and Prose (1954).

Laurence's first novel, This Side Jordan (1960), and her short story collection The Tomorrow-Tamer (1963) both explore how colonial rule shaped relations between Africans and Europeans. Even after she began setting her fiction in Canada, she continued to write about African literature. In 1968, she published Long Drums and Cannons: Nigerian Dramatists and Novelists 1952–1966, a study of Nigerian plays and novels.

=== University appointments ===
In 1969, Laurence became writer-in-residence at Massey College at the University of Toronto, where she gave lectures and spoke with students. She was also writer-in-residence at the University of Western Ontario in 1973 and at Trent University in 1974. Laurence was a frequently invited as a guest speaker at Trent and later served as its chancellor from 1981 to 1983.

== Film and stage adaptations ==
Paul Newman made his directorial debut with Rachel, Rachel (1968), an adaptation of Laurence's novel A Jest of God starring Joanne Woodward as Rachel Cameron. Kari Skogland wrote and directed the 2007 film adaptation of The Stone Angel, with Ellen Burstyn as Hagar Shipley.

The Olden Days Coat became a children's television film in 1981. Anne Wheeler directed a 1985 short film based on "To Set Our House in Order" and later directed the 1993 television adaptation of The Diviners.

James W. Nichol adapted The Stone Angel for the stage, which was staged by the Theatre Network in 1996. Another stage adaptation, The Diviners, was written by Vern Thiessen with Yvette Nolan and premiered at the Stratford Festival in 2024.

== Personal and later life ==
Laurence moved to Lakefield, Ontario. She also bought a cabin on the Otonabee River near Peterborough, Ontario, where she wrote The Diviners (1974) during the summers of 1971 to 1973.

In 1976, Margaret Laurence co-founded the Writers' Trust of Canada, a charitable organization that supports Canadian writers, with Margaret Atwood, Pierre Berton, Graeme Gibson, and David Young.

In 1978, she was the subject of a National Film Board of Canada documentary, Margaret Laurence: First Lady of Manawaka.

Her literary papers are housed in the Clara Thomas Archives at York University in Toronto and at McMaster University's William Ready Division of Archives and Research Collections in Hamilton.

== Death ==
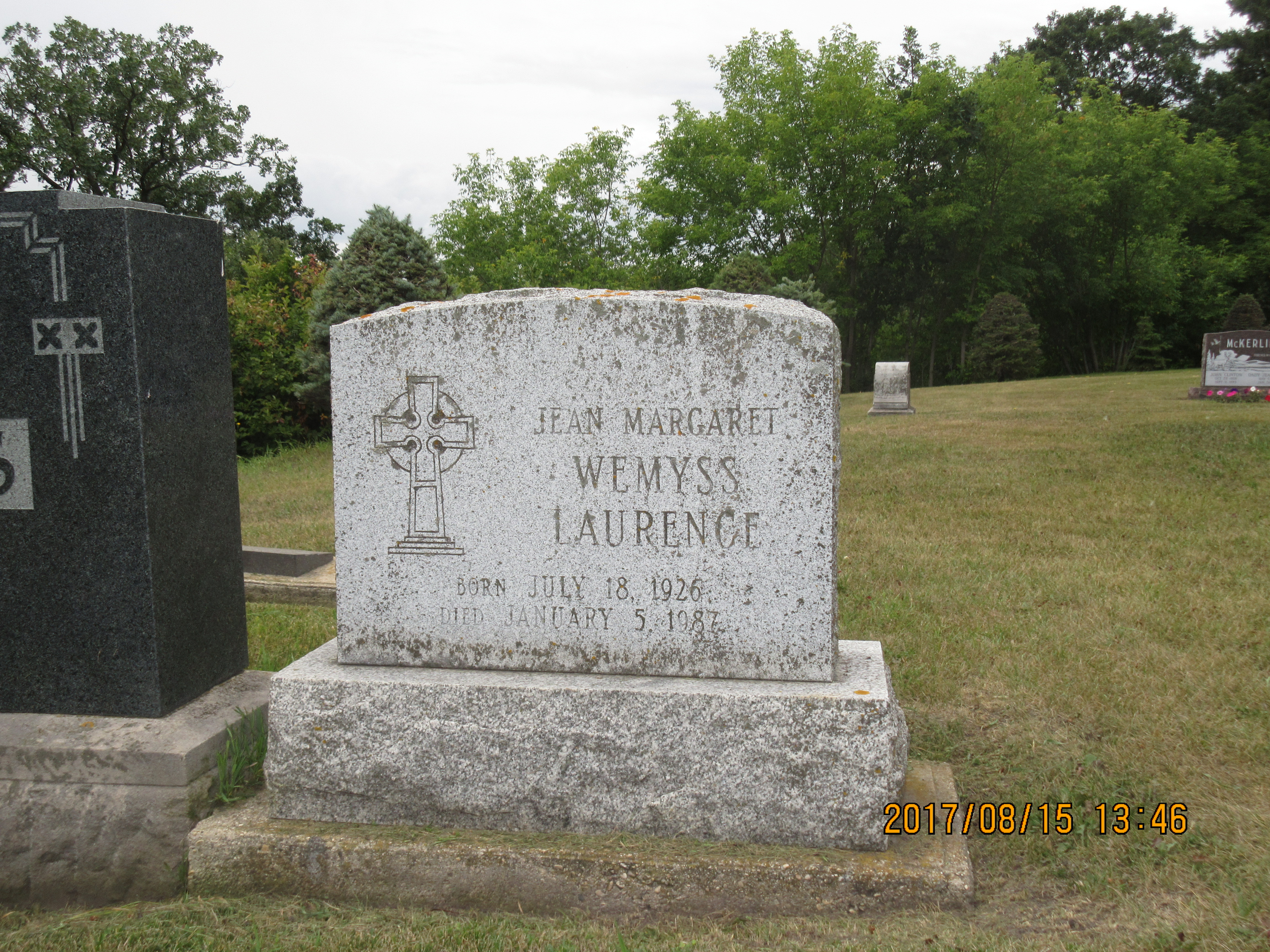
Laurence's grave marker in Neepawa, Manitoba

In July 1986, Laurence was diagnosed with terminal lung cancer. She lived another six months, then died on January 5, 1987at her home in Lakefield, Ontario. She was 60. Newspapers reported at the time that she had died of cancer. However, ten years later, in his 1997 biography The Life of Margaret Laurence, James King reported that she had died by suicide.

Her ashes were buried in the Wemyss family plot in Neepawa at Riverside Cemetery on June 23, 1987. The following day, her childhood home opened to the public as the Margaret Laurence Home.

== Awards and recognition ==
=== Literary awards ===
- 1961: Beta Sigma Phi Award for the best first novel by a Canadian, for This Side Jordan.
- 1961, 1962 and 1964: University of Western Ontario President's Medal for Canadian short stories.
- 1966: Governor General's Award for English-language fiction for A Jest of God.
- 1974: Governor General's Award for English-language fiction for The Diviners.
- 1975: Molson Prize.
- 1977: Periodical Distributors Award.
- 1981: Canadian Booksellers Association Writer of the Year Award.
- 1983: Banff Centre National Award.

=== Fellowships ===
- 1967 and 1971: Senior fellowships from the Canada Council.
- 1977: Elected a Fellow of the Royal Society of Canada.

=== National and community honours ===
- 1972: Appointed a Companion of the Order of Canada for her contribution to Canadian literature.
- 1976: B'nai B'rith Woman of the Year Award.
- 1978: City of Toronto Award of Merit.
- 2014: Designated a National Historic Person. A commemorative plaque at her childhood home in Neepawa, Manitoba, recognizes her contributions to Canadian literature.

=== Honorary degrees ===
Laurence received 14 honorary degrees from Canadian universities. These included:

- 1972: University of Toronto.
- 1974: Carleton University.
- 1980: York University.
- 1986: University of Manitoba.

=== Book selections ===
- 2002: The Stone Angel selected for Canada Reads, with writer Leon Rooke advocating for the novel.

=== Commemoration and legacy ===
- 1987: The University of Winnipeg established the Margaret Laurence Chair in Women's Studies, which later developed into the Institute for Women's and Gender Studies. The university also hosted a Margaret Laurence Chair Speakers Series.
- The Writers' Trust of Canada honours Laurence through its annual Margaret Laurence Memorial Lecture series, in which Canadian authors discuss their lives and work.
- The thirteenth and fourteenth floors of Bethune Residence at York University are named Margaret Laurence House.
- Her childhood home in Neepawa is a museum devoted to her life and work.

== Bibliography ==
=== Novels ===
- This Side Jordan (1960)
- The Stone Angel (1964)
- A Jest of God (1966)
- The Fire-Dwellers (1969)
- The Diviners (1974)

=== Short story collections ===
- The Drummer of All the World (1956)
- The Tomorrow-Tamer (1963)
- A Bird in the House (1970)

=== Children's books ===
- Jason's Quest (1970)
- Six Darn Cows (1979)
- The Olden Days Coat (1980)
- The Christmas Birthday Story (1982)

=== Non-fiction ===
- A Tree for Poverty (1954) — anthology of Somali poetry and folk stories
- The Prophet's Camel Bell (1963) — non-fiction account of Laurence's life in British Somaliland
- Long Drums and Cannons: Nigerian Dramatists and Novelists 1952-1966 (1968)
- Heart of a Stranger (1976) — essays
- Dance on the Earth: A Memoir (1989)

== Notes ==
Academic offices
| Preceded by William Morton | Chancellor of Trent University; 1981–1983 | Succeeded by John Josiah Robinette |
