= List of Canadian films of 1989 =

This is a list of Canadian films which were released in 1989:

Title	Director	Cast	Genre	Notes
50 ans	Gilles Carle		National Film Board short	50th anniversary tribute to NFB; it won the Short Film Palme d'Or at Cannes
American Boyfriends	Sandy Wilson	Margaret Langrick, John Wildman, Jason Blicker, Lisa Repo-Martell	Drama	Sequel to My American Cousin
Babar: The Movie	Alan Bunce	voices Gordon Pinsent, Sarah Polley, Elizabeth Hanna, Lisa Yamanaka	Animated feature	Canada-France co-production
Buying Time	Mitchell Gabourie	Jeff Schultz, Page Fletcher, Dean Stockwell, Michael Rudder	Crime drama	
Bye Bye Red Riding Hood	Márta Mészáros	Fanny Lauzier, Pamela Collyer, Margit Makay, Jan Nowicki, Teri Tordai	Children's film	From the Tales for All series; Canada-Hungary co-production
Bye Bye Blues	Anne Wheeler	Rebecca Jenkins, Luke Reilly, Stuart Margolin, Wayne Robson, Robyn Stevan	War-time romance melodrama	
Cold Comfort	Vic Sarin	Paul Gross, Maury Chaykin, Margaret Langrick	Thriller	Based on a play by Jim Garrard
Cruising Bar	Robert Ménard	Michel Côté, Louise Marleau, Geneviève Rioux, Véronique Le Flaguais, Diane Jules	Comedy	Genie Award – Special Award for Makeup
The Defender	Stephen Low		National Film Board documentary	
The Devil's Hole (Le Trou du diable)	Richard Lavoie		Documentary	
Eddie and the Cruisers II: Eddie Lives!	Jean-Claude Lord	Michael Paré, Marina Orsini	Rock 'n' Roll drama	Sequel to the 1983 Eddie and the Cruisers made with U.S. financing
Empire of Ash III	Michael Mazo	William Smith	Futuristic action drama	Direct to video
The First Season	Ralph L. Thomas	Kate Trotter, R. H. Thomson	Drama	
Food of the Gods II	Damian Lee	Lisa Schrage, Colin Fox, Frank Pellegrino, Jackie Burroughs	Horror	
Foreign Nights	Izidore K. Musallam	Terri Hawkes, Dean Richards	Drama	
George's Island	Paul Donovan	Sheila McCarthy, Maury Chaykin, Ian Bannen	Children's film	
Goddess Remembered	Donna Read		National Film Board documentary	
How to Make Love to a Negro Without Getting Tired (Comment faire l'amour avec un nègre sans se fatiguer)	Jacques W. Benoit	Isaach De Bankolé, Maka Kotto, Roberta Weiss, Myriam Cyr	Comedy, drama	
In and Out	Alison Snowden, David Fine		Animated short	
In Search of the Last Good Man	Peg Campbell		Short comedy-drama	
In the Belly of the Dragon (Dans le ventre du dragon)	Yves Simoneau	David La Haye, Rémy Girard, Michel Côté, Pierre Curzi, Monique Mercure	Satire/action/sci-fi drama	
Jesus of Montreal (Jésus de Montréal)	Denys Arcand	Lothaire Bluteau, Rémy Girard, Monique Miller, Johanne-Marie Tremblay, Catherine Wilkening, Robert Lepage	Modern day passion play	Canada-France co-production
Juke-Bar	Martin Barry		National Film Board animated short	Genie Award - Animated Short
Justine's Film (Le film de Justine)	Jeanne Crépeau	Marie-Hélène Montpetit		
Kingsgate	Jack Darcus	Christopher Plummer, Roberta Maxwell, Alan Scarfe	Drama	
The Last Winter	Aaron Kim Johnston	Joshua Murray, Gerard Parkes, David Ferry, Wanda Cannon	Drama	
Laura Laur	Brigitte Sauriol		Drama	
Lessons on Life (Trois pommes à côté du sommeil)	Jacques Leduc		Drama	
Looking for Eternity (Portion d'éternité)	Robert Favreau	Paul Savoie, Danielle Proulx, Marc Messier, Gilles Pelletier, Patricia Nolin	Drama	Canada-France co-production
Mindfield (La mémoire assassinée)	Jean-Claude Lord	Michael Ironside, Lisa Langlois, Christopher Plummer	Thriller	
Mob Story	Gabriel Markiw, Jancarlo Markiw	Margot Kidder	Crime drama	
Monster in the Coal Bin	Allen Schinkel	Adam Smoluk	Short drama	
Multiple Choice	Debbie McGee	Lois Brown, Andy Jones, Maisie Rillie, Mack Furlong	Short drama	
Norman's Awesome Experience	Paul Donovan	Tom McCamus	Time-travelling comedy	
Odyssey in August	Stephen Roscoe	Oliver Dennis	Short comedy	
The Paper Wedding (Les Noces de papier)	Michel Brault	Geneviève Bujold, Manuel Aranguiz, Dorothée Berryman, Gilbert Sicotte	Drama	Entered into the 40th Berlin International Film Festival
Roadkill	Bruce McDonald	Valerie Buhagiar, Don McKellar	Rock 'n' Roll docudrama	Bruce McDonald's first feature; TIFF – Best Canadian Feature
Salut Victor	Anne Claire Poirier	Jean-Louis Roux, Jacques Godin	National Film Board drama	
Snake Eater	George Erschbamer	Lorenzo Lamas	Action	
Speaking Parts	Atom Egoyan	Michael McManus, Arsinée Khanjian	Drama	
Speed Zone	Jim Drake	John Candy	Comedy	
Stealing Images	Alan Zweig		Short drama	
Stunt People	Lois Siegel		Documentary	
Termini Station	Allan King	Colleen Dewhurst, Megan Follows	Drama	
Thunderground	David Mitchell	Michael Ironside, Margaret Langrick, William Sanderson	Drama	
Things	Andrew Jordan	Barry J. Gillis, Amber Lynn	Horror	
The Top of His Head	Peter Mettler	Stephen Ouimette, Christie MacFadyen, Gary Reineke	Experimental feature	
Unfaithful Mornings (Les matins infidèles)	François Bouvier, Jean Beaudry	Jean Beaudry, Denis Bouchard	Drama	
Welcome to Canada	John N. Smith		Docufiction	
Where the Spirit Lives	Bruce Pittman	Michelle St. John	Television drama	
White Lake	Colin Browne		Documentary	
You Take Care Now	Ann Marie Fleming		Experimental animation	

== See also ==
- 1989 in Canada
- 1989 in Canadian television
