= 11th Genie Awards =

1990 Canadian film awards

- Date: March 20, 1990
- Site: Metro Toronto Convention Centre, Toronto, Ontario
- Hosted by: Al Waxman; Brian Linehan

Highlights
- Best Picture: Jésus de Montréal (Jesus of Montreal)
- Most awards: Jésus de Montréal (12)

Television coverage
- Network: CTV

The 11th annual Genie Awards were presented March 20, 1990, and honoured Canadian films released in 1989.

For this year, CTV had negotiated to serve as broadcaster and the academy formed a wholly owned subsidiary, ACCTV Productions, to independently produce its show. In the months leading up to the event, CTV extensively promoted the awards, and broadcaster Brian Linehan and a film crew traveled to Vancouver, Edmonton, Toronto and Montreal, shooting vignettes about Canadian films and filmmaking.

The ceremony was broadcast from the Metro Toronto Convention Centre. There was no overall host, but actor Al Waxman introduced and concluded the show. Linehan hosted his vignettes and each Best Picture nominees was given a two-minute clip.

The awards were dominated by Denys Arcand's Jésus de Montréal, which won 13 of the 16 awards for which it was nominated. However, CTV failed to persuade its regional affiliate stations to broadcast the ceremony. Ratings plummeted, with only half as many people (460,000) watching, compared to the previous year. This prompted a complete re-evaluation and restructuring of the Genie Awards.

== Award winners and nominees ==
Motion Picture	Direction
Jesus of Montreal (Jésus de Montréal) — Roger Frappier, Pierre Gendron; Bye Bye Blues — Arvi Liimatainen, Anne Wheeler; Cold Comfort — Ray Sager, Ilana Frank; Speaking Parts — Atom Egoyan; Termini Station — Allan King	Denys Arcand, Jesus of Montreal (Jésus de Montréal); François Bouvier and Jean Beaudry, Unfaithful Mornings (Les Matins infidèles); Atom Egoyan, Speaking Parts; John N. Smith, Welcome to Canada; Anne Wheeler, Bye Bye Blues
Actor in a leading role	Actress in a leading role
Lothaire Bluteau, Jesus of Montreal (Jésus de Montréal); Maury Chaykin, Cold Comfort; Michel Côté, Cruising Bar; Michael McManus, Speaking Parts; Stephen Ouimette, The Top of His Head	Rebecca Jenkins, Bye Bye Blues; Colleen Dewhurst, Termini Station; Megan Follows, Termini Station; Margaret Langrick, Cold Comfort; Gabrielle Rose, Speaking Parts; Catherine Wilkening, Jesus of Montreal (Jésus de Montréal)
Actor in a supporting role	Actress in a supporting role
Rémy Girard, Jesus of Montreal (Jésus de Montréal); Don McKellar, Roadkill; Michael Ontkean, Bye Bye Blues; Gilles Pelletier, Jesus of Montreal (Jésus de Montréal); Wayne Robson, Bye Bye Blues	Robyn Stevan, Bye Bye Blues; Pauline Martin, Jesus of Montreal (Jésus de Montréal); Johanne-Marie Tremblay, Jesus of Montreal (Jésus de Montréal)
Original Screenplay	Adapted Screenplay
Denys Arcand, Jesus of Montreal (Jésus de Montréal); Atom Egoyan, Speaking Parts; Don McKellar, Roadkill; Peter Mettler, The Top of His Head; Colleen Murphy, Termini Station; Anne Wheeler, Bye Bye Blues	Elliot L. Sims and Richard Beattie, Cold Comfort; Dany Laferrière and Richard Sadler, How to Make Love to a Negro Without Getting Tired (Comment faire l'amour avec un nègre sans se fatiguer); John Varley, Millennium
Best Feature Length Documentary	Best Short Documentary
Strand: Under the Dark Cloth — John Walker; The Devil's Hole (Le Trou du diable) — Richard Lavoie, François Dupuis, Marc Daigle; White Lake — Colin Browne	Stunt People — Lois Siegel; Reading Between the Lines — Martha Davis; Who Gets In? — Barry Greenwald
Best Live Action Short Drama	Best Animated Short
In Search of the Last Good Man — Peg Campbell, Peggy Thompson; The Journey Home — Mary Armstrong; Monster in the Coal Bin — Tracy Traeger, Ellen Rutter, Allen Schinkel; Multiple Choice — Debbie McGee; Odyssey in August — Leonard Farlinger, Stephen Roscoe	Juke-Bar — Martin Barry; The Dingles — William Pettigrew; In and Out — Alison Snowden and David Fine
Art Direction/Production Design	Cinematography
François Séguin, Jesus of Montreal (Jésus de Montréal); John Blackie, Bye Bye Blues; Reuben Freed, Palais Royale	Guy Dufaux, Jesus of Montreal (Jésus de Montréal); Richard Leiterman, The First Season; Pierre Mignot, Cruising Bar; René Ohashi, Millennium
Costume Design	Editing
Louise Jobin, Jesus of Montreal (Jésus de Montréal); Olga Dimitrov, Millennium; Maureen Hiscox, Bye Bye Blues; Louise Labrecque, Cruising Bar; Martha Wynne Snetsinger, The Last Winter; Katherine Vieira, Palais Royale	Isabelle Dedieu, Jesus of Montreal (Jésus de Montréal); Frank Irvine, The First Season; Christopher Tate, Bye Bye Blues
Overall Sound	Sound Editing
Patrick Rousseau, Adrian Croll, Hans Peter Strobl and Jo Caron, Jesus of Montreal (Jésus de Montréal); Sal Grimaldi, Joe Grimaldi, Dino Pigat, and Peter Shewchuk, Termini Station; Paul Massey, Peter Kelly, and Garrell Clark, Bye Bye Blues; Don White, Marvin Berns, Paul Coombe, and Douglas Ganton, Millennium	Marcel Pothier, Laurent Lévy, Antoine Morin, and Diane Boucher, Jesus of Montreal (Jésus de Montréal); Terry Burke, David Templeton, Ralph Brunjes and Brian Ravok, Termini Station; Paul Dion, In the Belly of the Dragon (Dans le ventre du dragon); Alison Fisher, Penny Hozy, Bruno DeGazio, Peter Thilaye and Alison Grace, Bye Bye Blues; Alan Hardiman, Terry Burke, Barry Backus, Jim Hopkins and Ingrid Rosen, American Boyfriends; Alan Hardiman, Robin Leigh, Jim Hopkins, Penny Hozy and Terry Burke, Millennium
Original Score	Original Song
Yves Laferrière, Jesus of Montreal (Jésus de Montréal); Mychael Danna, Speaking Parts; Mychael Danna and Jeff Danna, Cold Comfort; Milan Kymlicka, Babar: The Movie; Lawrence Shragge, Palais Royale	Bill Henderson, "When I Sing" — Bye Bye Blues; Claude Dubois and Dany Laferrière, "On vit de femmes" — How to Make Love to a Negro Without Getting Tired (Comment faire l'amour avec un nègre sans se fatiguer); Colin Nairne, Barney Bentall and Gary Fraser, "Restless Dreamer" — American Boyfriends; Jane Siberry, "This Old Earth" — The Top of His Head; Maribeth Solomon, "The Best We Both Can Be" — Babar: The Movie; Maribeth Solomon, "Elephant March" — Babar: The Movie
Special awards	
Golden Reel Award: Jesus of Montreal (Jésus de Montréal); Achievement in Make-Up: Jacques Lafleur and Pierre Saindon, Cruising Bar; Outstanding Contributions to the Canadian Film Industry: Harold Greenberg	
