= René Lévesque (disambiguation) =

René Lévesque (1922–1987) was a Canadian politician, the founder of the Parti Québécois, and the 23rd Premier of Quebec.

René Lévesque may also refer to:

- René-Lévesque, a provincial electoral district in Quebec
- René Lévesque (TV miniseries), a 2006 miniseries
- René Lévesque (TV series), a 1994 television series
