= List of submissions to the 58th Academy Awards for Best Foreign Language Film =

1985 Best Foreign Language Film submissions

Highlights
- Oscar winner: (Argentina) The Official Story
- Submissions: 30
- Debuts: none

This is a list of submissions to the 58th Academy Awards for Best Foreign Language Film. The Academy Award for Best Foreign Language Film was created in 1956 by the Academy of Motion Picture Arts and Sciences to honour non-English-speaking films produced outside the United States. The award is handed out annually, and is accepted by the winning film's director, although it is considered an award for the submitting country as a whole. Countries are invited by the academy to submit their best films for competition according to strict rules, with only one film being accepted from each country.

For the 58th Academy Awards, thirty films were submitted in the category Academy Award for Best Foreign Language Film. The five nominated films came from France, Hungary, West Germany and Yugoslavia and Argentina.

Argentina won the award for the first time with The Official Story by Luis Puenzo, which was also nominated for Best Writing, Screenplay Written Directly for the Screen. It became the first Latin American film to win the award.

== Submissions ==
Submitting country	Film title used in nomination	Original title	Language(s)	Director(s)	Result
Argentina	The Official Story	La historia oficial	Spanish	Luis Puenzo	Won Academy Award
Austria	Malambo		German	Milan Dor	Not nominated
Belgium	Dust		French, English	Marion Hänsel	Not nominated
Canada	Jacques and November	Jacques et novembre	French	Jean Beaudry and François Bouvier	Not nominated
Czechoslovakia	Scalpel, Please	Skalpel, prosím	Czech	Jirí Svoboda	Not nominated
Denmark	Twist and Shout	Tro, håb og kærlighed	Danish	Bille August	Not nominated
France	Three Men and a Cradle	Trois hommes et un couffin	French	Coline Serreau	Nominated
West Germany	Angry Harvest	Bittere Ernte	German	Agnieszka Holland	Nominated
Hungary	Colonel Redl	Oberst Redl, Redl ezredes	German, Hungarian	István Szabó	Nominated
Iceland	Deep Winter	Skammdegi	Icelandic	Þráinn Bertelsson	Not nominated
India	Saagar	सागर	Hindi	Ramesh Sippy	Not nominated
Israel	When Night Falls	עד סוף הלילה	Hebrew	Eitan Green	Not nominated
Italy	Macaroni	Maccheroni	Italian	Ettore Scola	Not nominated
Japan	Gray Sunset	花いちもんめ	Japanese	Shunya Ito	Not nominated
Mexico	Frida Still Life	Frida, naturaleza viva	Spanish	Paul Leduc	Not nominated
Netherlands	The Dream	De Dream	Dutch, West Frisian	Pieter Verhoeff	Not nominated
Norway	Wives – Ten Years After	Hustruer – ti år etter	Norwegian	Anja Breien	Not nominated
Peru	The City and the Dogs	La ciudad y los perros	Spanish	Francisco José Lombardi	Not nominated
Philippines	This Is My Country	Bayan ko: Kapit sa patalim	Tagalog, Filipino	Lino Brocka	Not nominated
Poland	Yesterday		Polish	Radosław Piwowarski	Not nominated
Portugal	Ana		Portuguese	Margarida Cordeiro and António Reis	Not nominated
Romania	Ciuleandra		Romanian	Sergiu Nicolaescu	Not nominated
Soviet Union	Come and See	Иди и смотри, Ідзі і глядзі	Russian, Belarusian	Elem Klimov	Not nominated
South Korea	Eoudong	어우동	Korean	Lee Jang-ho	Not nominated
Spain	The Witching Hour	La hora bruja	Spanish	Jaime de Armiñán	Not nominated
Sweden	Ronia the Robber's Daughter	Ronja Rövardotter	Swedish	Tage Danielsson	Not nominated
Switzerland	Alpine Fire	Höhenfeuer	Swiss German	Fredi M. Murer	Not nominated
Taiwan	Kuei-Mei, a Woman	我這樣過了一生	Mandarin	Chang Yi	Not nominated
Venezuela	Oriana		Spanish	Fina Torres	Not nominated
Yugoslavia	When Father Was Away on Business	Otac na službenom putu	Serbo-Croatian	Emir Kusturica	Nominated
