= Ben Wheeler =

Ben Wheeler may refer to:

- Ben Wheeler, Texas, an unincorporated community in Van Zandt County, Texas, United States
- Ben Wheeler (cricketer) (born 1991), New Zealand cricketer
- Ben Wheeler (Canadian doctor), Canadian doctor in the British Army
- Benjamin Ide Wheeler (1854–1927), Greek and comparative philology professor at Cornell University
- Benjamin Wheeler (2006-2012), victim in the Sandy Hook Elementary School shooting
