= Dany Laferrière =

Haitian writer, painter and filmmaker (born 1953)

Dany Laferrière OC OQ
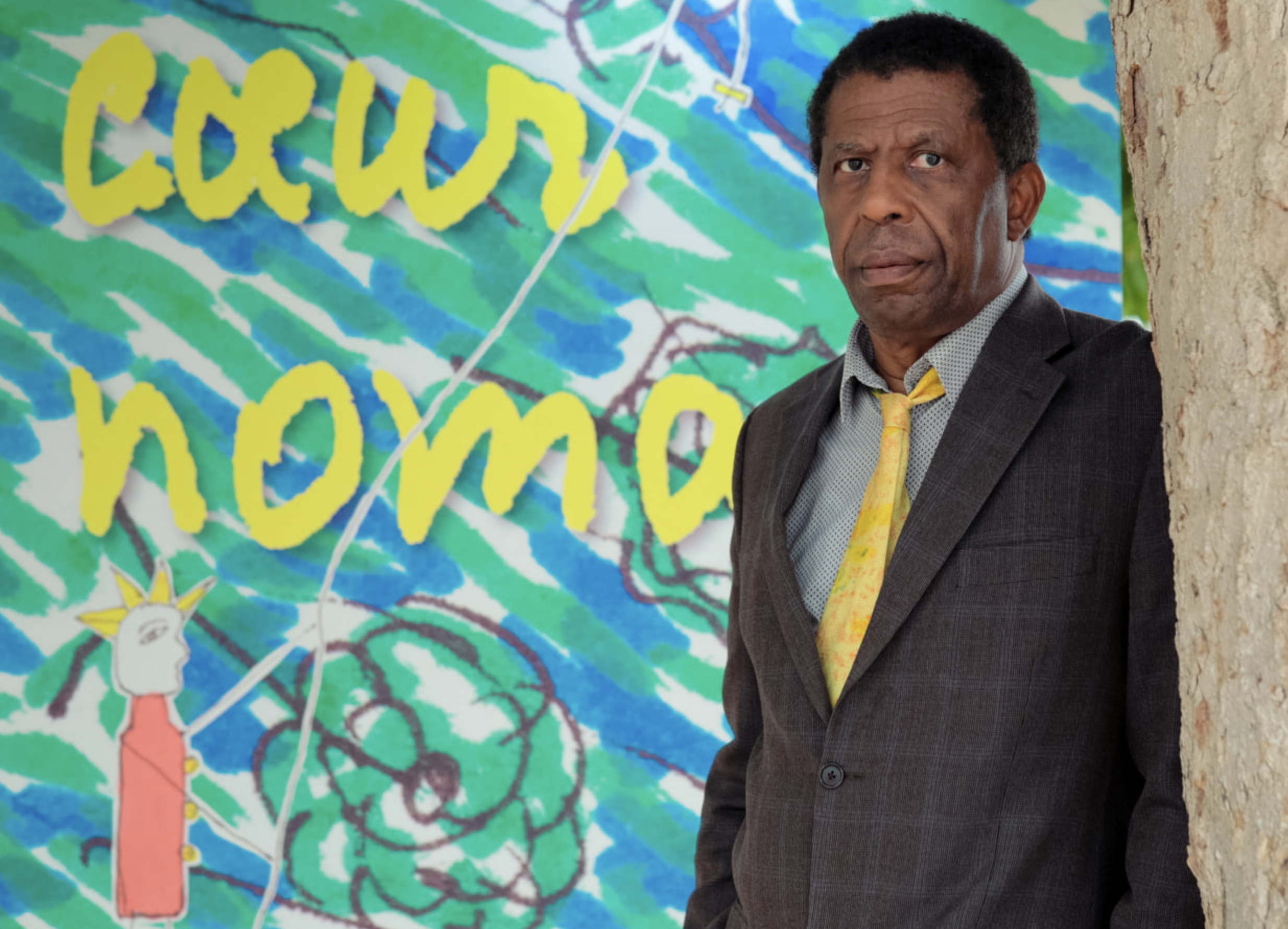
- Dany Laferrière in 2021
- Born: 13 April 1953 (age 73); Port-au-Prince, Haiti
- Citizenship: Haitian, Canadian
- Occupations: Writer, painter, filmmaker
- Children: Melissa, Sarah, Alexandra
- Writing career
- Language: French, Creole
- Website: danylaferriere.com

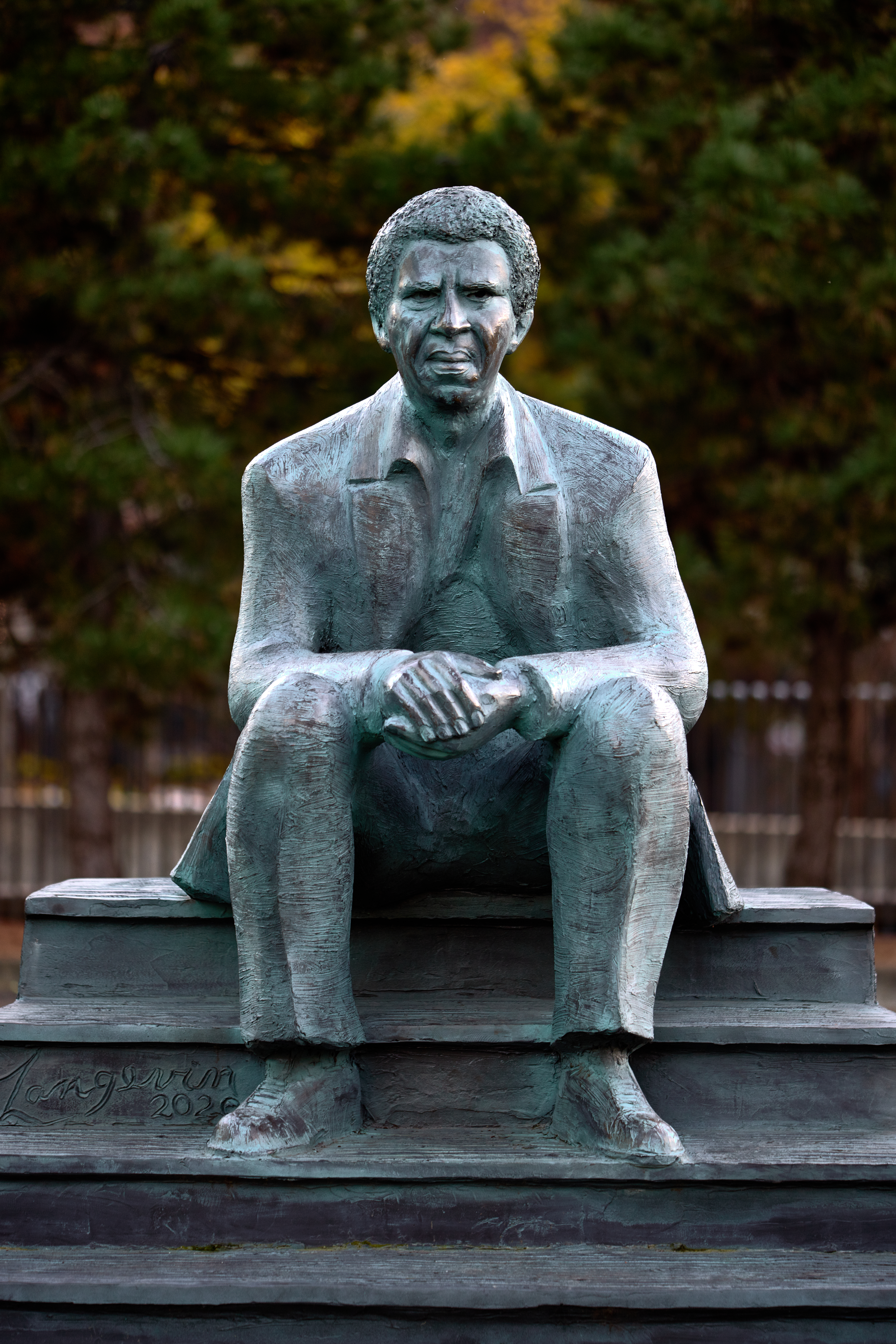
A statue of Laferrière by Roger Langevin sits outside the Grande Bibliothèque in Montreal.

Windsor Klébert Laferrière OC OQ (born 13 April 1953), known as Dany Laferrière (French pronunciation: [dani lafɛʁjɛʁ]) is a writer, painter and filmmaker. He was elected to seat 2 of the Académie française on 12 December 2013, and inducted in May 2015. Born in Haiti, he lives between Montreal and Paris.

== Life ==
Born in Port-au-Prince, Haiti, and raised in Petit-Goâve, Laferrière worked as a journalist in Haiti before moving to Canada in 1976. He also worked as a columnist in Canada and hosted television programming for the TQS network and Radio-Canada.

Laferrière published his first novel, How to Make Love to a Negro Without Getting Tired (Comment faire l'amour avec un nègre sans se fatiguer) in 1985. The novel was later adapted into a screenplay by Laferrière and Richard Sadler, earning a Genie Award nomination for best adapted screenplay at the 11th Genie Awards in 1990. The film adaptation of the novel starred Isaach De Bankolé and was directed by Jacques W. Benoit.

His works have been translated and published in more than twenty languages, including German, English (David Homel), Italian, Japanese, Spanish, and Korean. In a playful exploration of literary identity, he gave one of his novels the provocative title I Am a Japanese Writer, dedicating it “to all those who would like to be someone else.” The novel was named the top title of SWR2's 2020 German literary season.

Several further films have been adapted from his work, including On the Verge of a Fever (Le Goût des jeunes filles) in 2004 and Heading South (Vers le sud) in 2005. He also wrote the original screenplays for Voodoo Taxi in 1991 and How to Conquer America in One Night (Comment conquérir l'Amérique en une nuit) in 2004, and was the director of the latter.

In 2009, Laferrière won the prestigious Prix Médicis for his nineteenth book, L'énigme du retour. The novel follows the narrator as he returns to his birthplace in Haiti, 33 years after he left it, upon learning of his father's death in New York City. The narrative blurs the line between prose and poetry, resembling haiku structures in some sections.

On January 12, 2010, at 4:53:10 p.m., Laferrière was in Port-au-Prince as a guest of the Étonnants Voyageurs literary festival when the earthquake struck Haiti. In his black notebook, he recorded his impressions with such immediacy that The World Is Moving Around Me conveys the experience of the disaster as it unfolded. While television broadcasts showed collapsed buildings and the dead, Laferrière chronicled everyday life in a shattered city and the desperate efforts to preserve dignity and humanity. The English-language edition was named the Best Essay of 2013 by the American publication Kirkus Reviews.

December 12, 2013, marked a historic event : Dany Laferrière was elected to the Académie française. Before the vote, the Permanent Secretary consulted the President of the French Republic, regarding a candidate who was neither French nor Parisian, but born in Haiti, a naturalized Canadian, and a resident of Montreal. His candidacy was unprecedented. Laferrière was elected on the first round of balloting to Seat no. 2 of the Académie française, becoming the first Haitian, the first Canadian and the first Quebecer to receive that honour. He is the second black person to have been inducted, the first being Senegalese writer and statesman Léopold Sédar Senghor in 1983.

In 2020, to mark his 35 years of writing, the Quartier des spectacles produced the large-scale exhibition Cœur nomade, based on his hand-drawn books. The City of Montreal adopted this poetic name for the first Coeur-nomade Library, created in tribute to his exceptional career and as a legacy for the community. Artist Roger Langevin donated a monumental sculpture of Laferrière to Bibliothèque et Archives nationales du Québec. It was installed in the Art Garden, near his mural. The exhibition travelled to several cities, including Tunis, Frankfurt, and Dubai, and was also presented in the delegates’ entrance at the United Nations Headquarters in New York, on the Pont des Arts in Paris (between the Louvre and the Académie française), and on the forecourt of the Institut de France.

In 2021, his wax likeness is also on display at the Musée Grévin in Paris, where he is portrayed seated in an armchair, a book in hand, in conversation with Bernard Pivot, the renowned French literary journalist and television host.

In 2023, Adam Leith Gollner published Working in the Bathtub: Conversations with the Immortal Dany Laferrière, a collection of interviews with Laferrière, some of which were originally published in The Paris Review .

== Awards and honors ==
National orders

- Commander of the Legion of Honour
- Officer of the Order of Canada (2015)
- Officer of the National Order of Quebec (2014)

Cultural orders and distinctions

- Grand Officer of the Ordre de la Pléiade
- Commander of the Order of Arts and Letters (France)
- Companion of the Order of Arts and Letters (Quebec)
- Knight of the Order of Cultural Merit (Monaco)
- Medal of the Order of Francophones of America
- Queen Elizabeth II Diamond Jubilee Medal
- Mérite du français dans la culture (Quebec)
- Honorary Member of the Académie des sciences, belles-lettres et arts de Bordeaux
- Honorary Member of the Académie de Nîmes

Honorary doctorates

- Honorary Doctorate, École normale supérieure de Lyon (2010)
- Honorary Doctorate, Paris-Sorbonne University and Pierre and Marie Curie University
- Honorary Doctorate, McGill University
- Honorary Doctorate, Middlebury College
- Honorary Doctorate, Simon Fraser University
- Honorary Doctorate, University of Ottawa
- Honorary Doctorate, Université du Québec à Montréal

Literary awards

- Governor General's Literary Award, for English-language translation, Why Must a Black Writer Write About Sex?, 1994
- Governor General’s Literary Award, for Je suis fou de Vava (Canada, 2006)
- Prix Médicis, for The Return. (France, 2009)
- The Grand Prix du livre de Montréal, for The Return.
- The Blue Metropolis International Literary Grand Prix for his body of work
- International Literature Award by the House of World Cultures for The Return.
- Ludger-Duvernay Grand Prix for his body of work (2015)
- Dr. Martin Luther King Jr. Achievement Award for his body of work (2015)
- Prix Gouverneur de la Rosée for his body of work
- Meilleur roman français de l’année, Lire magazine, for The Return (2009)
- Best Essay, Kirkus Reviews, for The World Is Moving Around Me, translated by David Homel (2013)
- Prix Arbre des voyageurs, for Mythologies américaines
- Prix Carbet de la Caraïbe, for An Aroma of Coffee
- Prix Carbet des Lycéens, for Le Cri des oiseaux fous
- Grand Prix des Lycéens du Bénin, for Le Cri des oiseaux fous (2019)
- Prix Edgar-Lespérance, for Dining with the Dictator (1992)
- Prix RFO du Livre, for Why Must a Black Writer Write About Sex? (2002)

Film and multimedia awards

- Prix Zénith, for Comment conquérir l’Amérique en une nuit ?
- Banff Rockies Award and Audience Award, for La dérive douce d’un enfant de Petit-Goâve (Pedro Ruiz, 2009)
- Grand Prix Ulysse Arte Mare, Corsica, for his body of work
- Grand Prix Hommage, Black Film Festival, for his body of work

== Works ==
- Comment faire l'amour avec un nègre sans se fatiguer, 1985
  - English translation How to Make Love to a Negro Without Getting Tired (Coach House Press, 1987)
- Éroshima, 1987
  - English translation Eroshima (Coach House Press, 1991)
- L'odeur du café, 1991
  - English translation An Aroma of Coffee (Coach House Press, 1993)
- Le goût des jeunes filles, 1992
  - English translation Dining with the Dictator (Coach House Press, 1994)
- Cette grenade dans la main du jeune nègre est-elle une arme ou un fruit?, 1993
  - English translation Why Must a Black Writer Write About Sex?, 1994 (Coach House Press, 1994)
- Chronique de la dérive douce 1994
  - English translation A Drifting Year (Douglas & McIntyre1997)
- Pays sans chapeau, 1996
  - English translation Down Among the Dead Men (Douglas & McIntyre, 1997)
- La chair du maître, 1997
- Le charme des après-midi sans fin, 1997
- Le cri des oiseaux fous, 2000
- J'écris comme je vis; Entretien avec Bernard Magnier, 2000
- Je suis fatigué, 2000
- Comment conquérir l'Amérique en une nuit ?, 2004
  - How to Conquer America in One Night
- Je suis fou de Vava, 2005 – children's book
- Les années 80 dans ma vieille Ford, 2005
- Pays sans chapeau, 2006
- Vers le Sud, 2006
  - English translation Heading South (Douglas & McIntyre, 2008)
- Je suis un écrivain japonais
  - English translation I Am a Japanese Writer (Douglas & McIntyre, 2010)
- La fête des morts, 2009 – children's book
- L'énigme du retour, 2009
  - English translation The Enigma of the Return (Douglas & McIntyre, 2011)
  - English translation The Return
- Un art de vivre par temps de catastrophe, 2009
- Tout bouge autour de moi, 2010
  - English translation The World is Moving Around Me (Arsenal Pulp Press, 2013)
- Conversations. Interviews avec Ghila Sroka, 2010
- L'art presque perdu de ne rien faire, 2011
- Journal d'un écrivain en pyjama, 2013
- Le baiser mauve de Vava, 2014 – children's book
- Tout ce qu'on ne te dira pas, Mongo, 2015
- Mythologies américaines, 2015 – collected works
- Discours à l’Académie française, 2015
- Autoportrait de Paris avec Chat, 2018 – handwritten and hand-drawn novel
- Vers d'autres rives, 2019 – handwritten and hand-drawn novel
- L'exil vaut le voyage, 2020 – handwritten and hand-drawn novel
- Sur la route avec Bashō, 2021 – handwritten and hand-drawn novel
- Petit traité du racisme en Amérique, 2021
- Dans la splendeur de la nuit, 2022 – handwritten and hand-drawn novel
- L'enfant qui regarde, 2022
- Un certain art de vivre, 2024
- Autobiographie américaine, 2024 – collected works
- L'obsession du rouge, 2025 – handwritten and hand-drawn novel

Further reading

- Beniamin Vasile, Dany Laferrière: l'autodidacte et le processus de création, Paris: l'Harmattan, collection "Critiques Littéraires", 2008
