= Jack Edwards (British Army soldier) =

British Army soldier

- A 79-year-old Jack Edwards flies the Union Jack at half-staff in September 1997 from his 27th-floor flat, to mark Princess Diana's death
- Born: 24 May 1918; Cardiff, Wales
- Died: 13 August 2006 (aged 88); Prince of Wales Hospital, Sha Tin, Hong Kong
- Burial place: Hong Kong
- Military career
- Allegiance: United Kingdom
- Branch: British Army
- Rank: Sergeant
- Unit: Royal Corps of Signals
- Conflicts: Battle of Singapore
- Awards: Officer of the Order of the British Empire
- Other work: Housing officer and manager in Hong Kong

Jack Edwards, OBE (Chinese: 艾華士; 24 May 1918 – 13 August 2006) was a British World War II army sergeant and a POW, most well known for his dedicated efforts of tracking down Japanese war criminals and his determination displayed in defending the rights of Hong Kong war veterans.

== Early life ==
Jack Edwards was born in Cardiff, Wales on 24 May 1918, in the suburb of Canton, joining the Territorial Army just before the outbreak of the Second World War.

== British Army career ==
Edwards was an army sergeant in the Royal Corps of Signals when Singapore fell to the Japanese in February 1942. He was interned for some time by the Japanese in the notorious Changi Prison before being transported to Taiwan, then the Japanese colony of Formosa. Edwards was put into the Kinkaseki POW camp, a mountainous region near Jiufen, where he and 525 other inmates were forced to work the copper mine daily in tropical heat. To get to the mine, parties had to walk up 250 steps to top of a ridge, then down 831 more to sea, and then descend a further 800 steps inside the mine to the working face on the lowest levels. Thus every day, twice a day, the men had to walk up and down 1,881 crudely cut steps (by way of comparison there are 1,665 steps to the small platform on the top of the Eiffel Tower). His team was required to bring out 24 bogeys of copper every single day, if not, they were then beaten. As men died, or were transferred to other camps because they were too weak and ill to continue working, replacement contingents were drafted in to make up the numbers.

From the initial contingent of 525 only 120 remained in Kinkaseki when the camp was abandoned between 16 and 30 May 1945. Edwards was moved to a remote jungle camp called Kukutsu in the Taihoku Heights about 12 miles (19 km) from Shinten (now Xindian District). He was in the first party to arrive on 1 June 1945. Their first task was to construct the camp as the site was a derelict tea plantation with no facilities. All materials for the construction were carried by the prisoners who were forced to carry 40 to 60 kilograms (88 to 132 lb) each. On 28 August 1945 the USAAF started to drop food supplies on the camp and on the afternoon of 5 September American Marines arrived at the jungle camp. He and others were so emaciated that their eyes were sunken and their bodies mere skeletons of their former selves.

== After World War II ==
Edwards spent a year recuperating in Britain, then in 1946 he returned to Asia to help in the apprehension of Japanese war criminals and to give evidence at their trials as part of the war crimes investigation team in Hong Kong. While visiting Kinkaseki he found Document No. 2701 — the only surviving copy of the Japanese order to massacre all prisoners of war if the Allies landed on the Japanese home islands — and an important piece of evidence at the Tokyo War Crimes Tribunal.

On his return to South Wales Edwards worked in local government. There, he felt an active discouragement from talking about the horrors he experienced as a POW. Unable to settle, he left for Hong Kong in 1963. Edwards took up a post as a housing officer in the housing department of the Hong Kong administration, later becoming a senior housing manager for Hongkong Land. There, he was actively involved in the Hong Kong Ex-Servicemen's Association as well as the Royal British Legion, becoming later on its chairman. He was also president of the St David's Society of Hong Kong.

== Life as a campaigner ==
In 1989, after the suppression of the Tiananmen Square protests in Beijing, Edwards started to help the Hong Kong people with British Dependent Territories Citizenship (BDTC), to fight for the recognition as British Citizens with the right of abode in the United Kingdom from the British Government. He was featured in the open forum "Hong Kong - A Matter of Honour" which organized by RTHK in Hong Kong and the BBC in Britain, during which showed a Union Jack flag which was hoisted in Hong Kong during 1945, and defended the contributions from the British Army and local veterans in the program.

Through his efforts as the chairman of the Royal British Legion (Hong Kong and China branch), in 1991 Edwards succeeded in winning monthly pension awards from the British government to ethnic Chinese veterans and their widows. A greater triumph came in 1996 when Edwards fought and won the granting of British citizenship to wives and widows of those veterans.

He spoke out for the many in Hong Kong who during the occupation, had been forced to sell their businesses as well as property to the Japanese in exchange for the worthless Japanese military yen.

== Personal life ==
Edwards's first marriage ended because of the war. In 1990, he married Polly Tam So-lan, a former member of a Chinese People's Liberation Army dance troupe whom he met in 1974. They lived in a flat in Sha Tin in the New Territories. Both he and Polly loved dancing by practising to the tunes of Taiwanese songs in their small living-room. Edwards spoke fluent Cantonese. He was survived by his wife and her daughter by her first marriage.

== Trivia ==
- It took him 45 years to write his book Banzai You Bastards!.
- The first translator of his book, the Japanese journalist Shinji Nagino, was murdered in Montreal with two-thirds of the way to go.
- After being requested by Diana, Princess of Wales to find the grave of Major-General Merton Beckwith-Smith, the father of Princess Diana's lady-in-waiting who had died as a POW in Japan, Edwards managed to locate it.
- In 1981 the National Film Board of Canada released A War Story: Based on the Diaries of Dr. Ben Wheeler, docudrama produced, written, and directed by Anne Wheeler whose father was the Canadian doctor in the Kinkasekihe camp. Jack Edwards was a featured commentator in the film, along with several other former POWs who were interviewed in the documentary.
- In 2000, a memorial was erected in Kinkaseki to which Edwards returned for the second time with the help of a grant of £10,000 from the British Government.
- Edwards and his other POW survivors escaped impending death at the hands of their Japanese captors by a mere two days due to the dropping of the two American atomic bombs at Hiroshima and Nagasaki.
- When American aircraft began to drop supplies into Edwards' POW camp near the end of the war, several POWs and civilians were killed by the supplies which were dropped too low for their parachutes to work. Edwards was the only one to know flag semaphore in the camp as he had learned it in the Boys' Brigade. As Edwards frantically signalled "Don't Drop" the American aircraft circling overhead was about to drop supplies on top of him until the crew realised Edwards' signals. There was only one crew member on the aircraft who could read semaphore and he had learned it in the Boy Scouts of America.

== Quotes ==
The Allies rebuilt Japan and Germany and Italy. Nobody rebuilt our lives. The tears and nightmares will remain 'til death. I'm willing to forgive. None of us should forget.

== See also ==
- A War Story (1981), a docudrama about Major Ben Wheeler the doctor in Kinkaseki
