= Ben Wheeler (Canadian doctor) =

Canadian doctor

Major Ben Wheeler was a Canadian doctor in the British Army stationed in Singapore in 1942 when British forces unconditionally surrendered to the Japanese on February 15, 1942. He was imprisoned by the Japanese in Singapore and later moved to the Japanese colony of Formosa (now Taiwan) with other British prisoners of war (POWs). He was a camp doctor in each camp in which he was imprisoned. He survived the war and settled in Edgerton, Alberta, Canada.

== Biography ==
Ben Wheeler was a Canadian doctor who joined the British Indian Army as a doctor in the late 1930s with the rank of major. Shortly after the outbreak of the Second World War, he was posted to Singapore. In 1942 when British forces unconditionally surrendered to the Japanese on February 15, 1942. He was imprisoned by the Japanese in Singapore and later moved to the Japanese colony of Formosa (now Taiwan) with other British POWs.

Wheeler was sent to the prison camp at Kinkaseki in northern Formosa, where the prisoners were forced to work in a copper mine. He had a central role in keeping up the spirits and health of British and Commonwealth soldiers and was directly responsible for saving hundreds of lives. The prisoners were subjected to inhumane treatment by their Japanese guards. Conditions in the mine and the camp were as bad, if not worse in many cases, than those experienced by POWs under Japanese control on the now-famous Railway of Death in Burma and Thailand. He was the only Canadian in the camp. The survivors later saw to it that he got an Order of Britain for his heroic work.

Shortly after Wheeler left India for Singapore, his wife and children left India for Edgerton, Albert. After the fall of Singapore, she did not know if he was alive or dead for more than two years, when finally she received a postcard with his signature written over a date—after that there was little word until his camp was liberated by the Americans on September 26, 1945.

Wheeler came home to his wife in Edgerton by the end of 1945. Anne Wheeler was born in September 1946, one of the first of the "Baby Boomers."

== Films ==
A docudrama, A War Story, was made about his experiences as a prisoner of war. His daughter, Anne Wheeler, was the director of this feature length film which was released in 1981.

Anne Wheeler also wrote and directed a film loosely based on her mother's experience in Alberta during her husband's stay in the POW camp: Bye Bye Blues (1989).

== See also ==
- Jack Edwards, who wrote a book about his time as a POW in Kinkaseki
