= Arvi Liimatainen =

Canadian film and television director and producer

Arvi Liimatainen (August 31, 1949 - May 19, 2018) was a Canadian film and television director and producer, most noted as a producer of the theatrical film Bye Bye Blues and the television series Da Vinci's Inquest and Intelligence.

== Awards ==
Award	Year	Category	Work	Result	Ref(s)
Genie Awards	1990	Best Motion Picture	Bye Bye Blues with Anne Wheeler	Nominated	
Gemini Awards	1990	Best Short Dramatic Program	The Ray Bradbury Theatre: "To the Chicago Abyss" with Ray Bradbury, Peter Sussman, Jonathan Goodwill, Seaton McLean	Nominated	
Gemini Awards	1998	Best Dramatic Series	Jake and the Kid with Patrick Loubert, Andy Thomson, Peter Lhotka, Stephen Hodgins	Nominated	
Gemini Awards	2001	Best Dramatic Series	Da Vinci's Inquest with Chris Haddock, Laszlo Barna, Laura Lightbown, Lynn Barr	Won	
Gemini Awards	2002	Best Dramatic Series	Da Vinci's Inquest with Chris Haddock, Laszlo Barna, Laura Lightbown, Lynn Barr	Won	
Gemini Awards	2003	Best Dramatic Series	Da Vinci's Inquest with Chris Haddock, Laszlo Barna, Laura Lightbown, Lynn Barr	Nominated	
Gemini Awards	2004	Best Dramatic Series	Da Vinci's Inquest with Chris Haddock, Laszlo Barna, Laura Lightbown, Lynn Barr	Won	
Gemini Awards	2005	Best Dramatic Series	Da Vinci's Inquest with Chris Haddock, Laszlo Barna, Laura Lightbown, Lynn Barr	Nominated	
Gemini Awards	2005	Best TV Movie	The Life with Chris Haddock, Laura Lightbown, Lynn Barr, Pierre Sarrazin	Nominated	
Gemini Awards	2006	Best TV Movie	Intelligence: "Pilot" with Chris Haddock, Carwyn Jones, Laura Lightbown, Stephen Surjik	Nominated	
Gemini Awards	2007	Best Dramatic Series	Intelligence with Chris Haddock, Laura Lightbown	Nominated	
Gemini Awards	2008	Best Dramatic Series	Intelligence with Chris Haddock, Laura Lightbown	Won	
Canadian Screen Awards	2015	Best TV Movie	Borealis with Andrew Wreggitt, Jon Slan, Jordy Randall, Tom Cox	Won	
