= Richard Beattie =

Canadian screenwriter

Richard Beattie is a Canadian screenwriter. He is most noted for the 1989 film Cold Comfort, for which he and Elliot L. Sims won the Genie Award for Best Adapted Screenplay at the 11th Genie Awards in 1990.

Born and raised in British Columbia, Beattie studied political science at the University of British Columbia before applying to, but then dropping out of law school in 1985. His first screenplay, Blindside, was directed by Paul Lynch and released in 1987.

His other credits have included the films Prom Night IV: Deliver Us from Evil (1991), The Shower (1992), Cold Sweat (1993), No Contest II (1997), Grizzly Falls (1999), The Highwayman (2000), The Baby Formula (2009), High Plains Invaders (2009), Maximum Conviction (2012) and Cartels (2017), and episodes of the television series True Justice, Olympus, Insomnia and Rising Suns.
