= La Bolduc (film) =

- Directed by: François Bouvier
- Written by: Frédéric Ouellet; Benjamin Alix
- Produced by: Valérie D'Auteuil; André Rouleau
- Starring: Debbie Lynch-White; Émile Proulx-Cloutier; Mylène Mackay
- Cinematography: Ronald Plante
- Production company: Caramel Films
- Release date: March 23, 2018
- Running time: 103 minutes
- Country: Canada
- Language: French

La Bolduc is a Canadian drama film, directed by François Bouvier and released in 2018. A biopic of Quebec folk singer La Bolduc, the film stars Debbie Lynch-White in the title role.

The film also stars Émile Proulx-Cloutier as Bolduc's husband Édouard, Bianca Gervais as her friend Juliette Newton and Mylène Mackay as activist and politician Thérèse Casgrain, as well as Yan England, Serge Postigo, Germain Houde, Jean Beaudry and Paul Doucet.

The film premiered at the Festival du film de l'Outaouais on March 23, 2018, before going into general release across Quebec on April 6. It topped the provincial box office in its opening weekend, and finished 2018 as the year's second highest grossing Canadian film.
