= No Contest (film) =

- DVD cover
- Directed by: Paul Lynch
- Written by: Robert C. Cooper
- Starring: Shannon Tweed; Robert Davi; Roddy Piper; Andrew Dice Clay
- Release date: March 2, 1995
- Running time: 93 minutes
- Countries: Canada; United States
- Language: English

No Contest is a 1995 Canadian–American action thriller film directed by Paul Lynch and written by Robert C. Cooper. The movie stars Shannon Tweed, Robert Davi, Roddy Piper, and Andrew Dice Clay. It was released on March 2, 1995, and was followed by the sequel No Contest II in 1997.

== Plot ==
During a nationally televised beauty pageant, terrorists led by Raymond Ulysses (Andrew Dice Clay) seize control of the venue and take the contestants and crew hostage, seeking ransom and publicity. Sharon Bell (Shannon Tweed), the program's host and a former model, uses her wits and unexpected combat skills to resist and outmaneuver the hijackers, working against the clock to free the hostages and foil the terrorists' plans.

== Cast ==
- Shannon Tweed as Sharon Bell
- Robert Davi as Sergeant Crane
- Andrew Dice Clay as Raymond Ulysses "Oz" Brice
- Roddy Piper as "Ice"
- Nicholas Campbell as Victor "Vic"
- John Colicos as Senator Donald Wilson
- James Purcell as Captain Henricks
- Judith Scott as Nancy Polson
- Louis Wrightman as "Que"
- Keram Malicki-Sánchez as Cal
- J.D. Nicholsen as Zed (credited as Jack Nicholsen)
- Polly Shannon as Candice "Candy" Wilson, Miss U.S.A
