= Baseball Girls =

1995 Canadian documentary film

- Directed by: Lois Siegel
- Written by: Lois Siegel
- Produced by: Silva Basmajian
- Cinematography: Barry Perles
- Edited by: Robert Kennedy
- Music by: André Vincelli
- Production company: National Film Board of Canada
- Release date: August 30, 1995 (FFM)
- Running time: 82 minutes
- Country: Canada
- Language: English

Baseball Girls is a Canadian documentary film, directed by Lois Siegel and released in 1995. The film centres on women's baseball, profiling the history and culture of the sport from the days of the All-American Girls Professional Baseball League through to the modern day, through a blend of animation, still photography and live action footage.

== Production ==
Siegel began planning the film before the release of the 1992 film A League of Their Own, but stated that she was thankful that Penny Marshall's hit film had raised the profile of the subject. She also expressed her disappointment that Ken Burns's otherwise acclaimed 1994 documentary series Baseball had devoted very little time to women's role in the sport even though Burns had directly consulted Siegel for assistance in researching that aspect of the sport.

Faye Dancer, who had been a player in the All-American Girls league, served as a creative consultant on the film.

== Distribution and response ==
The film premiered at the 1995 Montreal World Film Festival, before screening at other Canadian and international film festivals through 1995 and 1996. It received a television broadcast on WTN in 1997.

The film faced some criticism for virtually ignoring the popularity of the sport among lesbians, with Siegel stating that she had contacted a lesbian baseball team to take part in the film, who declined due to the team members' concerns about being too publicly visible; conversely, however, it received praise for including the stories of some significant African-American players in the history of women's baseball, an element that A League of Their Own had downplayed.

It was a finalist for best documentary in the 1996 Toronto Film Critics Poll.
