= René Lévesque (miniseries) =

- Genre: Biographical drama
- Written by: Geneviève Lefebvre
- Directed by: Giles Walker
- Starring: Emmanuel Bilodeau; Pascale Bussières; Gilles Renaud
- Country of origin: Canada
- Original languages: English; French
- No. of seasons: 2
- No. of episodes: 10

Production
- Producer: Claudio Luca
- Cinematography: Serge Ladouceur
- Editor: Jean Beaudoin

Original release
- Network: CBC Television
- Release: September 7, 2006 – April 15, 2008

René Lévesque is a Canadian television biographical miniseries that aired on CBC Television and Radio-Canada from September 7, 2006 to April 15, 2008 for two seasons as did the 1994 television miniseries aired on TVA. It stars Emmanuel Bilodeau as former-Quebec premier René Lévesque.

== Plot and production ==
The series dramatized Lévesque as a journalist who eventually becomes the leader of the Parti Québécois. A journalist, Bilodeau, plays Lévesque, and it has been noted that Bilodeau had met the real Lévesque before the former-premier's death. The series was viewed as "part of CBC's high-impact programming strategy."

== Reception ==
One newspaper said Bilodeau had a "remarkable" similarity to Lévesque in appearance; however, another critic complained of "meandering looks at dubious 'icons' like separatist René Lévesque." The series was considered a ratings flop since it drew only 131,000 viewers. It was thus seen as being among a few disappointments for the CBC in 2006, along with the documentary Hockey: A People's History and the television series What It's Like Being Alone.

== Series overview ==
The first season ran from September 7 to 21, 2006 on CBC in the English version while it ran from September 14 to 28, 2006 on Radio-Canada in the French version for the first season. The second season titled René: Le Destin d'un chef ran from March 25 to April 15, 2008 on Radio-Canada in the French version while it ran from April 8 to 29, 2008 on CBC in the English version.

== See also ==
- René Lévesque (TV series)
- Trudeau (film)
