= Robert Nichol (cinematographer) =

Robert Nichol is a Canadian cinematographer, director, and writer.

== Filmography ==
Year	Title	Role	Notes
1982	Wonderland		
1981	A War Story		
1979	Harrison's Yukon		
1976	Mac's Mill		
1975	...and They Lived Happily Ever After		
1974	Would I Ever Like to Work		
1971	Pavilion		
1970	Facade		
1970	November		
1968	North		
1968	Wilf		
1967	Fisherman's Fall		
1967	Reception		
1967	Sabre and Foil		
1967	The Buildings Already Begun		
1967	What in the World Is Water?		
1967	Wheat		
1966	Better Housing for the Prairies		
1966	Bird of Passage		
1966	Change in the Maritimes		
1966	Illegal Abortion		
1966	Little White Crimes		
1966	The Changing Wheat Belt		
1966	The World of Three		
1965	Autobiographical by A.M. Klein		

Director
Year	Film	Genre	Other notes
1982	Wonderland		
1976	Mac's Mill		
1976	Striker		
1972	That Gang of Hoodlums?		
1970	November		
1968	Wilf		
1967	Fisherman's Fall		
1967	Wheat		

Writer
Year	Film	Genre	Other notes
1982	Wonderland		
1976	Striker		
