= Denis Bouchard =

French Canadian actor (born 1953)

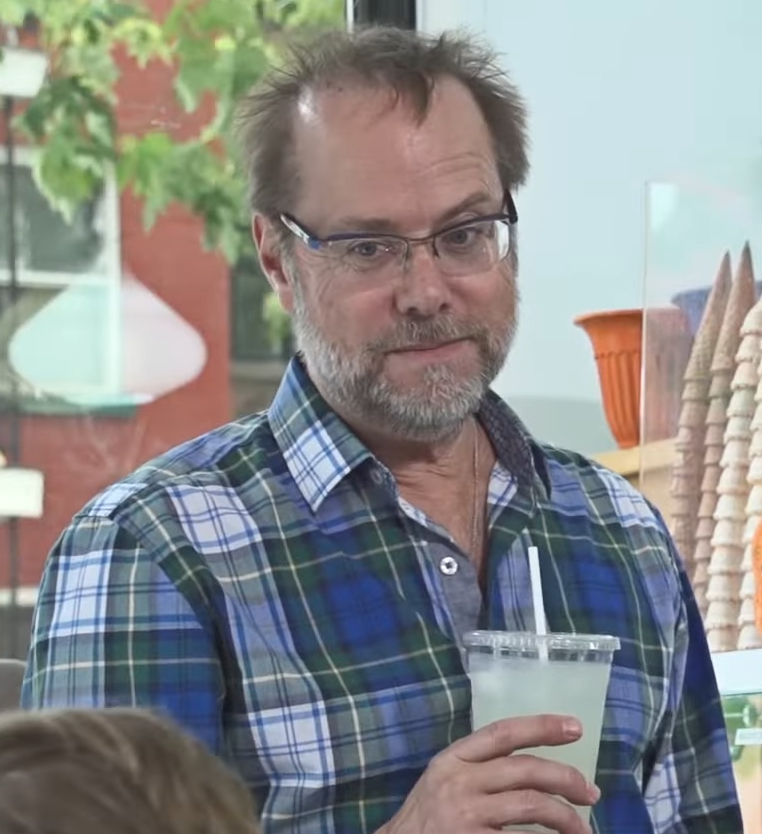
Denis Bouchard in 2015

Denis Bouchard (born October 9, 1953) is a Canadian actor and playwright from Quebec. He is most noted for his performances in Denise Filiatrault's 1998 film It's Your Turn, Laura Cadieux (C't'à ton tour, Laura Cadieux), for which he received a Jutra Award nomination for Best Supporting Actor at the 1st Jutra Awards in 1998, and François Bouvier's 1999 film Winter Stories (Histoires d'hiver), for which he received a Genie Award nomination for Best Actor at the 20th Genie Awards in 2000.

Originally from L'Abord-à-Plouffe, a village which has since been amalgamated into the city of Laval, Bouchard has acted in film, television and stage roles since the late 1970s. His noted roles have included the television series Terre humaine, He Shoots, He Scores (Lance et compte), René Lévesque, Avec un grand A and Annie et ses hommes, the films Unfaithful Mornings (Les matins infidèles), An Imaginary Tale (Une histoire inventée), Love Me (Love-moi), La Florida, The Ideal Man (L'homme idéal), The Barbarian Invasions (Les Invasions barbares), The Little Queen (La Petite reine) and The Fall of the American Empire (La chute de l'empire américain), and a 1980s stage revival of Gratien Gélinas's Fridolinades.

He won the 1989 Prix Guy-L'Écuyer for Unfaithful Mornings.

He was formerly married to actress Sandra Dumaresq, with whom he has one son. In a 2020 interview on Julie Snyder's television talk show La semaine des 4 Julie, he spoke for the first time about his relationship with his new wife, a funeral director whom he met while doing radio promotion for his death-themed theatrical play Le dernier sacrement.
