= The Gunrunner (film) =

- Theatrical release poster
- Directed by: Nardo Castillo
- Written by: Arnie Gelbart
- Produced by: Richard Sadler; Robert J Langevin
- Starring: Kevin Costner; Sara Botsford; Paul Soles; Gerard Parkes; Ron Lea; Mitch Martin
- Cinematography: Alain Dostie
- Edited by: Diane Fingado; André Corriveau
- Music by: Rex Taylor-Smith; Jean Sauvageau
- Distributed by: New World Pictures
- Release date: January 1, 1983
- Running time: 92 minutes
- Country: Canada
- Language: English

The Gunrunner is a Canadian crime drama film directed by Nardo Castillo and starring Kevin Costner.

== Cast ==
- Kevin Costner as Ted Beaubien
- Sara Botsford as Maud Ryan
- Paul Soles as Lochman
- Gerard Parkes as Wilson
- Ron Lea as George
- Mitch Martin as Rosalyn
- Larry Lewis as Robert
- Daniel Nalbach as Max

== Reception ==
William Thomas of Empire awarded the film two stars out of five. Leonard Maltin gave it one and a half stars.
