= Jacques and November =

1984 film

- Directed by: Jean Beaudry; François Bouvier
- Written by: Jean Beaudry; François Bouvier
- Produced by: François Bouvier; Marcel Simard
- Starring: Jean Beaudry
- Cinematography: Serge Giguère
- Edited by: Jean Beaudry
- Music by: Michel Rivard
- Production company: Les Productions du Lundi Matin
- Release date: 26 October 1984
- Running time: 72 minutes
- Country: Canada
- Language: French

Jacques and November (French: Jacques et novembre) is a 1984 Canadian drama film directed by Jean Beaudry and François Bouvier. The film was selected as the Canadian entry for the Best Foreign Language Film at the 58th Academy Awards, but was not accepted as a nominee.

The film stars Beaudry as Jacques Landry, a man in his early 30s who is dying of an unspecified incurable disease and documenting his thoughts on mortality in a video diary; simultaneously, his friend Denis (Pierre Rousseau) is trying to make a higher-budget documentary film about him.

Critics largely analyzed the film not as focusing on death as such, but as an affirming and uplifting look at the meaning that friends and family bring to life. Although Jacques Landry's terminal illness was not specified in the film, the LGBT magazine The Body Politic reviewed it as an HIV/AIDS allegory, directly comparing and contrasting its views of mortality with the contemporaneous HIV/AIDS-themed documentary film No Sad Songs.

== Production ==
Jean Beaudry and François Bouvier directed and wrote the film. Serge Giguère did the film photography while Claude de Maisonneuve and Bouvier did the video photography. Beaudry edited the film. Michel Rivard did the music for the film.

The film was initially given a budget of $50,000, but it grew to $225,000. $25,000 came from Telefilm Canada and $7,000 from the Quebec Institute of Cinema. $13,000 was used to shoot the film in Montreal over the course of 30 days between 23 November 1981 and 13 September 1982.

== Release ==
Cinéma Libre distributed the film in Quebec and it premiered at the Festival du nouveau cinéma on 26 October 1984. It was released theatrically on 1 November.

== Awards ==
The film was one of two selected for the Société générale du cinéma du Québec's annual awards, alongside André Melançon's The Dog Who Stopped the War (La Guerre des tuques). The award's prize consisted of a $100,000 investment in the production of the directors' next films.

The film received a Genie Award nomination for Best Original Song, for Michel Rivard's "Le temps nous dépasse".

== Cast ==
- Jean Beaudry as Jacques Landry
- Léa-Marie Cantin as Monique
- Carole Chatel
- Carole Fréchette as Pierrette
- Pat Gagnon as Visiteur à l'hôpital
- Pierre Rousseau as Denis Langlois

== See also ==
- List of submissions to the 58th Academy Awards for Best Foreign Language Film
- List of Canadian submissions for the Academy Award for Best Foreign Language Film

== Works cited ==
- Pallister, Janis (1995). The Cinema of Quebec: Masters in Their Own House. Associated University Presses. ISBN 0838635628.
- Turner, D. John, ed. (1987). Canadian Feature Film Index: 1913-1985. Canadian Film Institute. ISBN 0660533642.
