= Prix Guy-L'Écuyer =

Quebec film award

The prix Guy-L'Écuyer was a Quebec film award given yearly to the best actor performing in Quebecois film. It was given between 1987 and 1997 by the Rendez-vous du cinéma québécois.

It was named in honor of Guy L'Écuyer.

It was replaced in 1999 by the Prix Jutra.

== Winners ==
Year	Actor	Film
1987	Roger Le Bel	Night Zoo (Un zoo la nuit)
1988	Marie Tifo	Kalamazoo
1989	Denis Bouchard	Unfaithful Mornings (Les matins infidèles)
1990	Andrée Lachapelle	...comme un voleur
1991	Rita Lafontaine	L'homme de rêve
1992	Élise Guilbault	Cap Tourmente
1993	Geneviève Bujold	My Friend Max (Mon amie Max)
1994	Hugo Dubé; Pierre Rivard	Octobre
1995	Micheline Lanctôt	The Ear of a Deaf Man (L'Oreille d'un sourd)
1996	Louise Portal	Not Me! (Sous-sol)
1997	Tony Nardi	Mr. Aiello (La déroute)
