= A Cry in the Night (1996 film) =

- French: Le Cri de la nuit
- Directed by: Jean Beaudry
- Written by: Jean Beaudry
- Produced by: Claude Cartier
- Starring: Pierre Curzi; Félix-Antoine Leroux; Louise Richer
- Cinematography: Éric Cayla
- Edited by: Suzanne Allard
- Music by: Robert Marcel Lepage
- Production company: Les Productions du lundi matin
- Distributed by: Cinépix
- Release date: March 22, 1996
- Running time: 81 minutes
- Country: Canada
- Language: French

A Cry in the Night (French: Le Cri de la nuit) is a Canadian drama film, directed by Jean Beaudry and released in 1996. The film stars Pierre Curzi as Pierre, a night watchman at a college who indulges his passion for amateur astronomy on the building's roof; one night his routine is disturbed by the appearance of Nathaël (Félix-Antoine Leroux), a young man who is videotaping a farewell letter to his ex-girlfriend, and Hélène (Louise Richer), Pierre's own girlfriend who breaks up with him after revealing that she is pregnant.

The film's cast also includes Jocelyn Bérubé and Sabine Karsenti.

Éric Cayla received a Genie Award nomination for Best Cinematography at the 18th Genie Awards in 1997.
