= Elliot L. Sims =

Canadian film and television screenwriter

Elliot L. Sims was a Canadian film and television screenwriter. He is most noted for the 1989 film Cold Comfort, for which he and Richard Beattie won the Genie Award for Best Adapted Screenplay at the 11th Genie Awards in 1990.

Sims' other credits included episodes of It's a Man's World, The Littlest Hobo and E.N.G..
