= No Contest II =

- DVD cover
- Directed by: Paul Lynch
- Written by: Richard Beattie and Michael Stokes
- Starring: Shannon Tweed; Bruce Payne; Lance Henriksen
- Release date: 1996
- Running time: 86 min.
- Country: United States
- Language: English

No Contest II is a 1996 action thriller film directed by Paul Lynch and written by Michael Stokes and Richard Beattie and starring Shannon Tweed, Bruce Payne and Lance Henriksen. It is a sequel to No Contest.

== Plot ==
Erich Dengler (Lance Henriksen), the son of Manferd Dengler (a prominent Nazi during the rule of Adolf Hitler in Germany), poses as an Art Collector, Eric Dane, in order to take over the Holman Museum to retrieve a shipment of nerve gas that has been hidden in some art work. He holds the occupants of the museum, including Sharon Bell (Shannon Tweed) and film director Jack Terry (Bruce Payne), who are looking for a good location to shoot a film, hostage. Dengler attempts to unleash a lethal nerve gas bomb which threatens the safety of the world. His plan is to sell the rest of the nerve gas to the highest bidder. Jack and Sharon make it their business to stop him.

== Cast ==
- Lance Henriksen as Eric Dane / Erich Dengler
- Shannon Tweed as Sharon Bell
- Bruce Payne as Jack Terry
- Jayne Heitmeyer as Bobbi Bell
- Jeffrey Max Nicholls as Steven Ivory
- Joseph Griffin as Reggie
- David Keeley as Ritter
- Kevin Jubinville as Falco
- Sky Gilbert as Beagle
- Fiona Highet as Lisette
- Barbara Chilcott as Mrs. Holman
- Falconer Abraham as Jarvis
- Hamish McEwan as Binsey
- Sophie Simmons as Little Girl Rose
- Tommy Chang as Kidnapper

== Reception ==
One reviewer stated that the sequel had a 'slightly darker tone' than No Contest and was less enjoyable. Similarly, a different reviewer commented that 'what this film does best is remind you how good the first film was'. Another reviewer stated that 'the vast majority of the movie is standard Die Hard stuff'. A different reviewer commented that 'it gets the job done but it's not the best'. Edmond Grant described the film as 'straightforward' and a 'female twist on Die Hard (1988)'. Similarly, Owen Williams of Empire described the film as Die Hard 'in a museum'. Mick Martin and Marsha Porter described the film as an 'unimaginative, derivative thriller'. Jim McLellan stated that 'if you don’t look too hard, this is still passably entertaining, with the art gallery providing an interesting location for some battles (the cat-fight between Sharon and Dane’s henchwoman comes to mind, ending on a piece of unfortunately-pointy artwork)'. McLellan contended that 'Henriksen is good value as ever in the psycho role, e.g. shooting people because they can’t deliver Shakespeare to his liking and, while Payne is better known as a villain, he does decent work here in a more sympathetic role'. However, McLellan thought that the film did not use them effectively and that the film needed 'to be less obviously stage-managed towards its conclusion, which is obvious well before it happens'.
