= Debbie Lynch-White =

Canadian actress

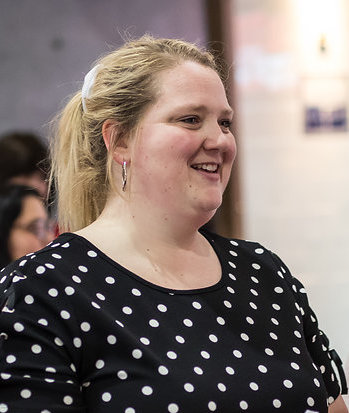
- Born: March 26, 1986 (age 40); Montreal, Quebec, Canada
- Occupation: Actress
- Known for: Unité 9, La Bolduc

Debbie Lynch-White (born 26 March 1986) is a Canadian film and television actress and author from Montreal.

== Career ==
Debbie Lynch-White graduated from Cégep de Saint-Hyacinthe Theatre School in 2010.

She is most noted for her performance in the 2018 film La Bolduc in the lead role as folk singer Mary Rose-Anna "La Bolduc" Travers. She had a regular supporting role as prison guard Nancy Prévost in the television series Unité 9. She's also appeared in the television series Le Jeu and Une autre histoire, and the films Sisters and Neighbors! (Nos belles-sœurs) and The Furies (Les Furies). She hosted a documentary series called Histoire de coming-out in 2021. In 2023, Lynch-White hosted Amour Libre, another documentary series directed by Maude Sabbagh.

Lync-White received a Prix Félix nomination for Best Female Vocalist in 2018 for the soundtrack to La Bolduc, in which she performed all of her own singing, and won the Prix Iris for Best Actress at the 21st Quebec Cinema Awards.

She announced a touring musical show, Elle était une fois, to premiere in 2019. She also has a non-fiction book, Faut que je te parle, published in 2018.

Lynch-White made her playwriting debut with L'usure de nos aurores in 2025. It received a 7.5/10 from La Presse, its critic noting her ability to craft an intimate escalating drama, with strong character development, centered on a lesbian couple.

== Personal life ==
In 2017, she married Marina Galland. They divorced in 2023 after eight years of marriage.
