= Gary Guthman =

American jazz musician

Gary Guthman is an American jazz musician from Portland, Oregon.

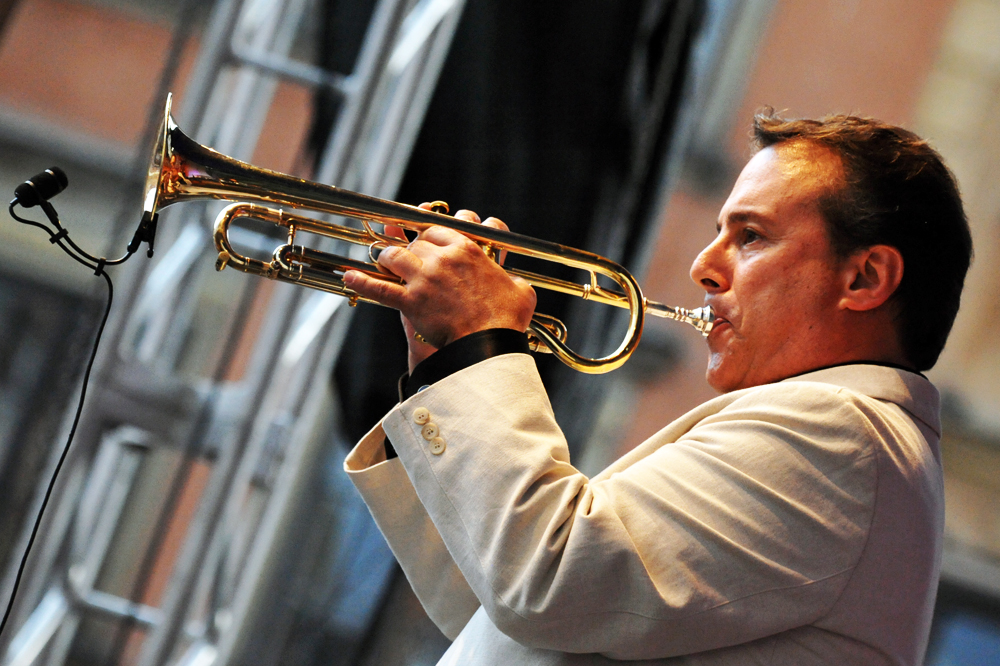
Gary Guthman during an open-air performance in Warszawa, Poland on August 13, 2011

From 1999 to 2001, he starred in the Big Band Musical Theatre production of "Forever Swing".
