= Termini Station (film) =

1989 film by Allan King

- Directed by: Allan King
- Written by: Colleen Murphy
- Based on: All Other Destinations Are Cancelled (1987 play) by Colleen Murphy
- Produced by: Don Haig; Allan King
- Starring: Megan Follows; Colleen Dewhurst; Gordon Clapp; Debra McGrath
- Cinematography: Brian R.R. Hebb
- Edited by: Gordon McClellan
- Music by: Mychael Danna
- Production company: Saturday Plays Ltd.
- Distributed by: Northern Arts Entertainment; Astral Media; Fox Lorber Home Video; Monarch Home Video
- Release date: September 1989 (TIFF)
- Running time: 108 minutes
- Country: Canada
- Language: English
- Budget: C$2 million

Termini Station is a 1989 Canadian drama film directed by Allan King and written by his wife Colleen Murphy, based on her play All Other Destinations Are Cancelled.

The film stars Colleen Dewhurst and Megan Follows as Molly and Micheline Dushane, a mother and daughter living in a small Northern Ontario town. Molly is an alcoholic, which creates tension between her and Micheline, while Micheline is a retail clerk and part-time prostitute who dreams of escaping her stifling small-town existence. The film's cast also includes Gordon Clapp and Debra McGrath as Molly's son and daughter-in-law, as well as Gordon Pinsent in flashbacks as Molly's deceased husband and Micheline's father, who unsuccessfully attempted to kill Micheline before committing suicide.

Termini Station was filmed on location in Kirkland Lake, Ontario. Its investors included Telefilm Canada and the Ontario Film Development Company.

== Distribution ==
The film premiered at the 1989 Toronto International Film Festival in September 1989. Its second screening was at the inaugural Cinéfest Sudbury International Film Festival two weeks later.

== Critical response ==
The film received mixed reviews from critics. Rick Groen of The Globe and Mail praised how King's background in documentary filmmaking had influenced the film's depiction of the "permanently half-finished look of the mid-North", but criticized the screenplay as melodramatic, while Peter Goddard of the Toronto Star called the cast talented but wasted, and concluded that "Canadiana any more Gothic than this and you could put an Elmira stove in it and sell it in Harrowsmith."

Marke Andrews of the Vancouver Sun wrote that the film's only redeeming quality was that it liberated Follows from her wholesome Anne of Green Gables image, while Wendy Dudley of the Calgary Herald suggested that King's choice to cast Dewhurst and Follows together as a mother and daughter, so soon after the Anne of Green Gables films, was one of the film's biggest problems, concluding that "it's hard to accept Marilla as a drunk and Anne as a whore."

The Los Angeles Times, conversely, acknowledged that the film "is stuck in the usual kitchen-sink realism that makes the Anglo-Canadian--as opposed to the often exciting Quebecois--cinema so often dull", but praised the cast, and Dewhurst in particular, for their performances.

== Awards ==
The film was nominated for six awards at the 11th Genie Awards: Best Picture, Best Actress (Dewhurst, Follows), Best Original Screenplay (Murphy), Best Overall Sound (Sal Grimaldi, Joe Grimaldi, Dino Pigat and Peter Shewchuk), and Best Sound Editing (Terry Burke, David Templeton, Ralph Brunjes, and Brian Ravok).
