= Thunderground =

- Directed by: David Mitchell
- Written by: Damian Lee; David Mitchell
- Produced by: Damian Lee; David Mitchell
- Starring: Michael Copeman; Paul Coufos; Pete Dempster; Margaret Langrick; M. Emmet Walsh
- Cinematography: Curtis Petersen
- Edited by: Reid Dennison
- Music by: John Cascella
- Production companies: Rose & Ruby Productions; Shapiro-Glickenhaus Entertainment; Thunderground Productions
- Distributed by: Cineplex-Odeon Films; Rose & Ruby Productions
- Release dates: May 1989; September 1, 1989 (USA)
- Running time: 92 min.
- Countries: United States, Canada
- Language: English

Thunderground is a 1989 action film directed by David Mitchell and starring Michael Copeman, Paul Coufos, Pete Dempster, Margaret Langrick, and M. Emmet Walsh.

== Plot summary ==
A con-artist meets a tough fighter and sees him as her ticket to a better life. The two make an agreement and head off to New Orleans to arrange a match with "the man" - the mysterious king of bare-knuckled boxing. There are no rules for this fight...one man wins when the other dies.

== Cast ==
- Michael Copeman as Cody
- Paul Coufos as "Bird"
- Pete Dempster as Rhubarb
- Donny Lalonde as Minister
- Margaret Langrick as Casey
- Kenneth W. Roberts as Cook
- William Sanderson as "Ratman"
- Ric Sarabia as "Moondog"
- Michael Scherer as Jim "Jimbo"
- Warren Van Evera as "Red Rider"
- Jesse Ventura as The Man
- M. Emmet Walsh as Wedge
