= Catherine Wilkening =

French actress (born 1963)

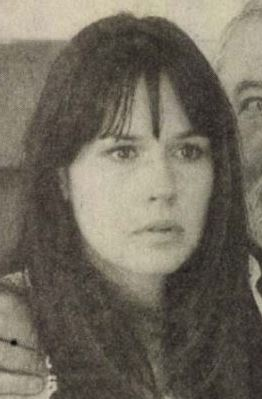
- Wilkening in 1993
- Born: 16 July 1963 (age 63); Dijon, France
- Occupation: Actress
- Known for: Jesus of Montreal; Marc Eliot

Catherine Wilkening (born 16 July 1963) is a French film and television actress. She is best known for her performance as Mireille, the Mary Magdalene figure in Denys Arcand's 1989 film Jesus of Montreal, and her lead role in the French police drama television series Marc Eliot.

She garnered a Genie Award nomination as Best Actress at the 11th Genie Awards for Jesus of Montreal.

== Selected filmography ==
=== Film ===
List of film appearances, with year, title, and role shown
Year	Title	Role	Notes
1986	Attention bandits!	Marie	
1987	My True Love, My Wound	Catherine	
1989	Jesus of Montreal	Mireille	
1992	La Crise	Marie	
2003	Le Cœur des hommes	Nanou	
2007	Le Cœur des hommes 2	Nanou	
2013	Le Cœur des hommes 3	Nanou	

=== Television ===
List of television appearances, with year, title, and role shown
Year	Title	Role	Notes
1996	Julie Lescaut	Marie-Claire Lemoine	1 episode
1996	Dalziel and Pascoe	Marion Carreaux	1 episode
1998–2005	Marc Eliot	Tina Paccard	15 episodes
2005	Dolmen	Chantal Perec	2 episodes
2006	Josephine, Guardian Angel	Jeanne Poirel	1 episode
2009	Profilage	Karine	1 episode
2009	Les Petits Meurtres d'Agatha Christie	Henriette Simonet	1 episode
2015	Capitaine Marleau	Cécile Castelnau	1 episode
2018	Section de recherches	Fanny Colomars	2 episodes
