= Palais Royale (film) =

1988 Canadian comedy film by Martin Lavut

- Directed by: Martin Lavut
- Screenplay by: Hugh Graham; Joanne McIntyre; David Daniels
- Story by: Hugh Graham
- Produced by: David Daniels; Lawrence Zack
- Starring: Kim Cattrall; Matt Craven; Kim Coates; Brian George; Michael Hogan; Dean Stockwell
- Cinematography: Brenton Spencer
- Edited by: Susan Martin
- Music by: Jonathan Goldsmith
- Production company: Metaphor Productions
- Distributed by: Norstar Releasing
- Release dates: September 10, 1988 (TIFF); May 12, 1989 (Canada)
- Running time: 90 minutes
- Country: Canada
- Language: English

Palais Royale (alternative titles Smoke Screen or Smokescreen) is a 1988 Canadian comedy film.

== Plot ==
This dark crime comedy is set in 1959 where Gerald Price (Matt Craven) is a newcomer to Toronto. He competes with mobster Tony Dicarlo (Kim Coates) for the affections of Odessa Muldoon (Kim Cattrall). Meanwhile, Michael Dattalico (Dean Stockwell) is eager to expand his organized crime business in Toronto. Much of the action takes place in the art deco dance hall of the title, a historic building set on the shores of Lake Ontario.

== Cast ==
- Kim Cattrall as Odessa Muldoon
- Matt Craven as Gerald Price
- Kim Coates as Tony Dicarlo
- Dean Stockwell as Michael Dattalico
- Henry Alessandroni as Dominic
- Victor Ertmanis as Sal
- David Fox as Bob
- Brian George as Gus
- Sean Hewitt as Mr. Gillis
- Michael Hogan as Sergeant Leonard
- Helen Hughes as Mrs. McDermott
- Sam Malkin as Sam
- Dee McCafferty as Officer Nichol
- Robin McCulloch as Rick
- Mario Romano as Joey

== Release ==
The film premiered at the Toronto International Film Festival on 10 September 1988, then given a general Canadian release on 12 May 1989. The film was also released under the titles Smoke Screen or Smokescreen.

== Reception ==
'There is humour in Palais Royale, if you don't mind Toronto in-jokes.' – Paul Townend, Cinema Canada
