= Stephen Roscoe =

Stephen Roscoe is a Canadian filmmaker and educator. He is most noted for his 1989 short film Odyssey in August, which was a Genie Award nominee for Best Live Action Short Drama at the 11th Genie Awards in 1990.

He subsequently became a media arts teacher at Glenforest Secondary School in Mississauga, Ontario, returning to filmmaking with the short films Parent-Teacher Night in 2009 and Momsters Playground in 2013.
