= Jean Beaudry =

Canadian film director, actor and screenwriter from Quebec

- Born: 1947 (age 77–78); Trois-Rivières, Quebec, Canada
- Occupation(s): Film director, actor and screenwriter

Jean Beaudry (born 1947 in Trois-Rivières) is a Canadian film director, actor and screenwriter from Quebec. He is most noted as co-director with François Bouvier of the 1984 film Jacques and November (Jacques et novembre), which was selected as Canada's submission for the Academy Award for Best International Feature Film at the 58th Academy Awards, and the 1989 film Unfaithful Mornings (Les Matins infidèles), for which the duo received a Genie Award nomination for Best Director at the 11th Genie Awards in 1990.

His first role as an actor was in Michel Audy's 1975 film The House That Hides the Town (La maison qui empêche de voir la ville). He subsequently acted in both Jacques and November and Unfaithful Mornings, and had a small supporting role in Jacques Leduc's 1989 film Lessons on Life (Trois pommes à côté du sommeil), but concentrated on filmmaking thereafter and did not have another acting role until La Bolduc in 2018.

Following Unfaithful Mornings he directed The Case of the Witch Who Wasn't (Pas de répit pour Mélanie), the tenth film in the Tales for All series of children's films. He followed up in 1992 with a second Tales for All film, The Clean Machine (Tirelire, combines & Cie), and in 1996 with the adult drama film A Cry in the Night (Le Cri de la nuit). He then did not return to film until 2013, when he was contacted by Rock Demers to direct a third Tales for All film, The Outlaw League (La Gang des hors-la-loi), after André Melançon was forced to abandon the project due to ill health.

His most recent film, the documentary François Barbeau: créateur de costumes, was released in 2018.

== Filmography ==
- Jacques and November (Jacques et novembre) - 1984
- Unfaithful Mornings (Les Matins infidèles) - 1989
- The Case of the Witch Who Wasn't (Pas de répit pour Mélanie) - 1990
- The Clean Machine (Tirelire, combines & Cie) - 1992
- A Cry in the Night (Le Cri de la nuit) - 1996
- The Outlaw League (La Gang des hors-la-loi) - 2013
- François Barbeau: créateur de costumes - 2018
