= Bye Bye Blues (film) =

- Directed by: Anne Wheeler
- Written by: Anne Wheeler
- Produced by: Arvi Liimatainen; Anne Wheeler
- Starring: Rebecca Jenkins; Michael Ontkean
- Cinematography: Vic Sarin
- Edited by: Christopher Tate
- Music by: George Blondheim
- Distributed by: Festival Films
- Release date: 1989
- Running time: 117 minutes
- Country: Canada
- Language: English
- Box office: C$375,000 (Canada)

Bye Bye Blues is a 1989 Canadian film. It was written and directed by Anne Wheeler and produced by Alberta Motion Picture Development Corporation with the assistance of Allarcom Limited.

== Plot ==
During World War II, Daisy Cooper (Rebecca Jenkins) returns home to her small Alberta town after she and her soldier husband, Teddy (Michael Ontkean), are split by the Japanese invasion of Hong Kong. While waiting for the war to end and to learn if Teddy is alive or dead, she joins a swing band as a singer to provide for her family, performing with them in many community halls. Daisy and her children initially live with her parents, but later rent a house for themselves, as Daisy chafes under their scrutiny. Daisy struggles to balance societal expectations of fealty and commitment to her children, while also struggling to financially support herself and her children by travelling and performing with the band. A trombonist in the band has a secret past and a not so secret yearning. Daisy struggles with an impossible choice as she hears that Teddy is returning home.

Her husband's sister, a somewhat similar free spirit, befriends an Australian airman in Alberta to train in the British Commonwealth Air Training Plan.

== Cast ==
The cast also includes Luke Reilly, Leslie Yeo, Kate Reid, Wayne Robson, Robyn Stevan, and Stuart Margolin.

== Awards ==
Award	Date of ceremony	Category	Recipient	Result	Ref.
Genie Awards	1990	Best Picture	Anne Wheeler, Arvi Liimatainen	Nominated	
Genie Awards	1990	Best Director	Anne Wheeler	Nominated	
Genie Awards	1990	Best Actress	Rebecca Jenkins	Won	
Genie Awards	1990	Best Supporting Actor	Michael Ontkean	Nominated	
Genie Awards	1990	Best Supporting Actor	Wayne Robson	Nominated	
Genie Awards	1990	Best Supporting Actress	Robyn Stevan	Won	
Genie Awards	1990	Best Original Screenplay	Anne Wheeler	Nominated	
Genie Awards	1990	Best Art Direction/Production Design	John Blackie	Nominated	
Genie Awards	1990	Best Costume Design	Maureen Hiscox	Nominated	
Genie Awards	1990	Best Editing	Christopher Tate	Nominated	
Genie Awards	1990	Best Overall Sound	Garrell Clark, Peter Kelly, Paul Massey	Nominated	
Genie Awards	1990	Best Original Song	Bill Henderson "When I Sing"	Won	

== Soundtrack ==
1. Main Title
2. Jazz Spring
3. Theme For Teddy
4. Marry Me Daisy
5. When I Sing
6. India
7. Sweet Georgia Brown
8. Max's Theme (I Love You Daisy)
9. Am I Blue
10. Bath Blues
11. Unfinished Blues
12. Who's Sorry Now
13. Home Movie/It's A Plane
14. You Made Me Love You
15. Blues For Anne
16. Bye Bye Blues

Credits

- Rebecca Jenkins - vocals
- Produced by Bob Hunka, John McCullough, and George Blondheim
- Music preparation by Laurie Bardsley
- Original film music composed and conducted by George Blondheim
- Mixed by Gary Dere, Paul Shubat, and Hayward Parrott
- Musicians: George Blondheim - piano, Mike Lent - bass, Bob McLaren - drums, Gene Bertoncini - guitar, Bob Stroup - trombone, P.J. Perry - clarinet and saxophone, Gary Guthman - trumpet, Vinod Bhardwaj - bansuri, Damyanti Bhardwaj - tanpura, Hari Sahay - tabla, George Ursan - drums ("When I Sing" and "Sweet Georgia Brown"), Melvin Wilson - guitar ("When I Sing"), Gary Koliger - guitar ("Sweet Georgia Brown"), Wayne Robson - background vocal ("When I Sing"), Wayne Robson, George Blondheim, Luke Reilly, and Stuart Margolin - vocal shouts ("Sweet Georgia Brown")
- Members of the Edmonton Symphony Orchestra: James Keene, Broderick Olson, Tom Johnson, Mary Johnson, Richard Caldwell, Hugh Davies, Stephen Bryant, Evan Verchomin, Andrew Bacon, Susan Ekholm, Derek Gomez, Tanya Prochzaka, Nora Bumanis, Colin Ryan, David Hoyt, Donald Plumb, Brian Jones, Susan Flook, Neria Mayer, Mikkio Kohjitani, John Taylor, Donald Hyder

== Copyright status ==
For several years Bye Bye Blues could not be exhibited on television or theatrically (and could not be issued on DVD or made available digitally) because nobody could determine who held the copyright. On August 21, 2013, however, the Copyright Board of Canada issued a licence to Rebecca Jenkins, allowing the film to be distributed in Canada by television, Internet, and other means. The licence was issued under section 77 of the Copyright Act, which allows the Copyright Board to issue a licence in respect of orphan works where "the Board is satisfied that the applicant has made reasonable efforts to locate the owner of the copyright and that the owner cannot be located". Pursuant to the licence, the film is available online in Canada through the iTunes Store, and two theatrical screenings were held in October 2014 at the Vancouver International Film Festival.
