= A War Story =

- Directed by: Anne Wheeler
- Written by: Anne Wheeler
- Produced by: Tom Radford; Anne Wheeler
- Starring: David Edney; Frank C. Turner
- Narrated by: diary Donald Sutherland story Anne Wheeler
- Cinematography: Robert Nichol; Ron Orieux
- Edited by: Ray Harper
- Production company: National Film Board of Canada (NFB)
- Distributed by: National Film Board of Canada (NFB)
- Release date: 8 November 1981 (Canada)
- Running time: 82 minutes
- Country: Canada
- Language: English

A War Story is a 1981 Canadian docudrama produced, written, and directed by Anne Wheeler. It tells the story of her father Major Ben Wheeler when he was captured by the Japanese during the Second World War.

The film also shows the Japanese perspective as it shows the harsh, inhuman treatment of the POWs. During that time, A Japanese soldier would kill himself before allowing himself to be taken prisoner. This cultural difference caused the Japanese to look at captured soldiers as having no honour. At the end of the film, as the Americans arrived to liberate the camps, many of the Japanese guards at the camp committed suicide rather than become prisoners.

== Plot ==
Major Ben Wheeler was a Canadian doctor assigned to Singapore when the Japanese forced an unconditional surrender of the British in 1942. The movie recounts, through the pages of his diary, the traumatic experiences of himself and his comrades as POWs in the Kinkaseki POW camp (a mining labour camp in northern Taiwan).

The story is conveyed from two perspectives: the narration of Ben Wheeler's diary (by Donald Sutherland) with dramatized scenes of life in the camp and archival footage of related events, and the vivid, personal stories of Dr. Wheeler's surviving fellow POWs. The film flashes between the story of the camp and Wheeler's family life before and after the war, as well as interviews of the survivors giving perspectives of the events described by Dr Wheeler.

Dr Wheeler is the protagonist who is portrayed as the major reason the other British POWs survived, both physically and mentally. This is affirmed by his overarching concern for his men in his writing, other than longing for his wife and family, with the exception of his love and longing for his family. Evidence of feats, compassion and selflessness are also abundantly given by the interviewees, who all owed their lives to him.

Although the Japanese captors are no doubt the cruel and humiliating antagonists, the film does not demonize them. In fact, the final interviewee provides some insightful revelation on how he and his comrades perceive their captors, and the effect of his experience on his life.

== Cast ==
- David Edney as Dr. Ben Wheeler
- Donald Sutherland as the narrator of the diary (voice)
- Frank C. Turner as Peter Seed
- Anne Wheeler as narrator (voice)
