= Cold Comfort (film) =

- Directed by: Vic Sarin
- Written by: Richard Beattie; Elliot L. Sims
- Based on: Cold Comfort by Jim Garrard
- Produced by: Ilana Frank; Ray Sager
- Starring: Paul Gross; Maury Chaykin; Margaret Langrick; Jayne Eastwood
- Cinematography: Vic Sarin
- Edited by: Nick Rotundo
- Music by: Mychael Danna; Jeff Danna
- Release date: August 28, 1989 (FFM)
- Running time: 111 min.
- Country: Canada
- Language: English

Cold Comfort is a Canadian psychological thriller film, released in 1989. The film was written by Richard Beattie and Elliot L. Sims based on the play by Jim Garrard, and directed by Vic Sarin.

The film premiered in August 1989 at the Montreal World Film Festival.

== Plot ==
Stephen (Paul Gross) is a salesman who gets drawn into a sexual psychodrama between Floyd (Maury Chaykin), a sociopathic truck driver, and his daughter Dolores (Margaret Langrick), when the three are caught together in a blizzard.

The film's cast also includes Jayne Eastwood, Ted Follows, Richard Fitch and Grant Roll.

== Production ==
The film was slated to be shot in Edmonton and Winnipeg, but had to be relocated to Ontario after production delays led the arrangements to fall through. Cynthia Preston had also been originally cast in the role of Dolores, but had to drop out after suffering injuries in a car accident, and Langrick was cast to replace her.

In 1990, Langrick reprised the role of Dolores in a Vancouver stage production of Garrard's original play.

== Reception ==
Award	Date of ceremony	Category	Nominees	Result	Reference
Genie Awards	March 20, 1990	Best Picture	Ray Sager, Ilana Frank	Nominated	
Genie Awards	March 20, 1990	Best Actor	Maury Chaykin	Nominated	
Genie Awards	March 20, 1990	Best Actress	Margaret Langrick	Nominated	
Genie Awards	March 20, 1990	Best Adapted Screenplay	Elliot L. Sims, Richard Beattie	Won	
Genie Awards	March 20, 1990	Best Original Score	Mychael Danna, Jeff Danna	Nominated	
