= Juke-Bar =

- Directed by: Martin Barry
- Written by: Martin Barry
- Produced by: Yves Leduc
- Starring: Louis Saraïva; François Bottega; Pierre Mailloux
- Cinematography: François Beauchemin
- Edited by: Werner Nold
- Music by: Martin Barry
- Distributed by: National Film Board of Canada (NFB)
- Release date: 1989
- Running time: 10 minutes
- Country: Canada

Juke-Bar is a 1989 stop motion musical animated short about cockroaches who party inside a jukebox. The film is directed by Martin Barry and produced in Montreal by the National Film Board of Canada. Juke-Bar received the Genie Award for Best Animated Short at the 11th Genie Awards, along with the Special Jury Award and Public's Award at the Zagreb World Festival of Animated Films, the Silver Hugo in the Animation category at the Chicago International Film Festival and the best short film awards at the Carrousel international du film de Rimouski and Montreal World Film Festival.

== Plot ==
A Restauranter hires two men to install a jukebox in his restaurant. The establishment is crawling with cockroaches (all of whom are portrayed with cartoonish characteristics, complete with colorful hair and affects). Pigtails hides underneath a matchbox that is supposedly crushed by the jukebox, while her friend Beanie watches on. The rest of the cockroaches examine the new jukebox for the evening with Green Hair entering through the coin slot. He activates the machine as the interior is revealed to resemble a club. The rest of the cockroaches enter through a small crack in the glass discovered by Cigar and Eyepatch. All the cockroaches enjoy their new hangout as Beanie remains outside, concerned for Pigtails. In the morning, the jukebox locks itself up with the cockroaches still inside as the men from earlier come and retrieve it, revealing themselves to be exterminators. Pigtails is safe and sound as Beanie checks on her, while the Restauranter smokes a cigar in victory. Beanie and Pigtails scurry away into a hole.

== Cast ==
- Louis Saraïva as Restauranter
- François Bottega as Exterminator
- Pierre Mailloux as Exterminator
