= Odyssey in August =

- Directed by: Stephen Roscoe
- Produced by: Leonard Farlinger; Stephen Roscoe
- Starring: Oliver Dennis
- Cinematography: Paul Sarossy
- Distributed by: Canadian Filmmakers Distribution Centre
- Release date: 1989
- Running time: 30 minutes
- Country: Canada
- Language: English

Odyssey in August is a Canadian short film, directed by Stephen Roscoe and released in 1989. The film stars Oliver Dennis as August Dunlop, a man who imagines himself experiencing various fantastical adventures while waiting in line at the passport office.

The film received a Genie Award nomination for Best Live Action Short Drama at the 11th Genie Awards in 1990.
