= Lois Siegel =

Lois Siegel (born 1946) is an American-born Canadian film director and photographer. She is most noted for her 1989 short documentary film Stunt People, and her 1995 feature documentary Baseball Girls.

== Early career ==
Born in Wisconsin, Siegel attended Ohio University, where she was a sportswriter for the student newspaper. After graduating with a master's degree in English, she moved to Montreal in 1970 to study French at McGill University. After completing her studies, she decided to stay in Canada, becoming a Canadian citizen and working in various roles in film, including assistant camera credits on the films East End Hustle, The Rubber Gun and Happiness Is Loving Your Teacher.

== Filmmaking ==
Her first film for the NFB was 1979's Stunt Family, part of the Canada Vignettes series.

In 1983 she released the experimental feature film A 20th Century Chocolate Cake. She followed up in 1988 with Strangers in Town, a mid-length documentary film about people with albinism.

In this era she also had numerous credits as a casting director, including on the films Train of Dreams, Tommy Tricker and the Stamp Traveller, Princes in Exile and Vincent and Me.

Stunt People, released in 1989, was a longer film about the same family of stunt performers she had profiled in Stunt Family. It was the winner of the Genie Award for Best Short Documentary at the 11th Genie Awards in 1990,

She followed up in 1993 with Lip Gloss, a documentary film about the drag scene in Montreal whose participants included Armand Larrivée, Derek McKinnon and Guilda. Baseball Girls, a film about the history of women's baseball, followed in 1995.

She has also taught film studies courses at John Abbott College and the Mel Hoppenheim School of Cinema.

== Photography ==
Throughout her career, Siegel was also a photographer, regularly photographing both film sets and jazz, blues and rock concerts. She did this mainly as a hobby at first, but after Baseball Girls she began to exhibit her photography in gallery shows.

She later moved to Ottawa, where she taught video production at the University of Ottawa, and continued to work as a freelance photographer for media, arts organizations and community groups in the city. She was also the writer of "A Man for All Stages", a documentary about actor Christopher Plummer, for the CBC Television biographical documentary series Life and Times.

== Filmography ==
- Spectrum in White - 1971
- Paralysis - 1972
- Painting With Light - 1974
- Boredom - 1976
- Faces - 1976
- Canada Vignettes: Stunt Family - 1978
- Dialogue of an Ancient Fog - 1978
- Recipe to Cook a Clown - 1978
- Solitude - 1978
- Arena - 1979
- A 20th Century Chocolate Cake - 1983
- Plastic Dreams - 1988
- Strangers in Town - 1988
- Stunt People - 1989
- Pancake on a Hot Tin Roof - 1990
- Lip Gloss - 1993
- Baseball Girls - 1995
