= Stunt People =

- Directed by: Lois Siegel
- Written by: Kevin Tierney
- Produced by: Lois Siegel
- Starring: .
- Edited by: Lois Siegel
- Music by: André Vincelli
- Production company: National Film Board of Canada
- Release date: 1989
- Running time: 56 minutes
- Country: Canada
- Language: English

Stunt People is a Canadian short documentary film, directed by Lois Siegel and released in 1989. The film profiles the Fourniers, a family of Canadian stunt performers, through a blend of interview segments and clips of their performances in films.

Siegel had previously made a shorter three-minute film, Stunt Family, about the Fourniers for the National Film Board of Canada's Canada Vignettes series in 1979.

The film was the winner of the Genie Award for Best Short Documentary at the 11th Genie Awards in 1990,
