= Unfaithful Mornings =

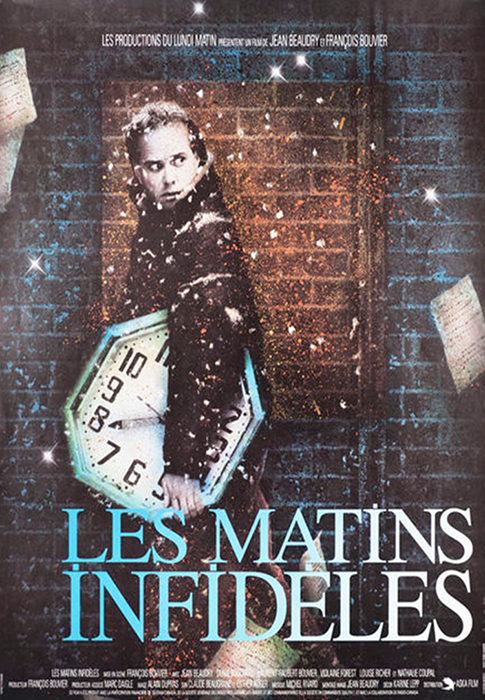
- French: Les matins infidèles
- Directed by: François Bouvier; Jean Beaudry
- Written by: François Bouvier; Jean Beaudry
- Produced by: François Bouvier
- Starring: Denis Bouchard; Jean Beaudry
- Cinematography: Alain Dupras
- Edited by: Jean Beaudry
- Music by: Michel Rivard
- Production company: Les Productions du lundi matin
- Release date: August 26, 1989 (MWFF)
- Running time: 84 minutes
- Country: Canada
- Language: French

Unfaithful Mornings (French: Les matins infidèles) is a Canadian drama film, directed by François Bouvier and Jean Beaudry and released in 1989. An exploration of the creative process, the film stars Denis Bouchard as Jean-Marc, a photographer undertaking a project in which he photographs the same street corner each morning at 8 a.m., and Beaudry as Marc, a novelist who is writing a fiction work based on the photographs.

Bouvier and Beaudry received a Genie Award nomination for Best Director at the 11th Genie Awards. Denis Bouchard won the 1989 Prix Guy-L'Écuyer for Unfaithful Mornings.
