= How to Make Love to a Negro Without Getting Tired =

- French: Comment faire l'amour avec un nègre sans se fatiguer
- Directed by: Jacques W. Benoit
- Written by: Dany Laferrière
- Produced by: Richard Sadler; Ann Burke; Henry Lange
- Starring: Isaach De Bankolé; Maka Kotto; Roberta Weiss
- Cinematography: John Berry
- Edited by: Dominique Roy
- Music by: Manu Dibango
- Release date: 1989
- Running time: 98 mins.
- Country: Canada
- Language: French
- Budget: $3 million

How to Make Love to a Negro Without Getting Tired (French: Comment faire l'amour avec un nègre sans se fatiguer) is a 1989 French-language Canadian drama film directed by Jacques W. Benoit, starring Isaach de Bankolé and Maka Kotto, and written by Haitian author Dany Laferrière based on his novel of the same name. The film was released in the US on 8 June 1990. The New York Times, the Toronto Star, the Toronto Sun and The Boston Globe all refused to publish advertisements for the film, while The Washington Post did. The film was controversial upon its initial release because of its title and was boycotted by the NAACP.

== Plot ==
In Montreal, two African men, Man (de Bankolé) and Bouba (Kotto), share an apartment. Man is a student and aspiring author while Bouba is an amateur philosopher. The film is a slice of life story about Man and Bouba's sexploits. Man (de Bankolé) spends most of his time flirting with women around the city with the philosophy that if he talks to as many girls as possible his chances of having sexual relations with them will be higher. In the movie, many of them do, and he gives them nicknames: "Miz Literature," "Miz Mystic," "Miz Redhead," and so on. The story proceeds to document these short lived sexual relations with details on biracial sexual relations and stereotypes.

== Production ==
The film cost $3 million.

== Reception ==
The film was seen by 128,006 people in France.

== Awards ==
The film was nominated for two Genie Awards in the year 1990. It was nominated for Best Adapted Screenplay for Dany Laferrière and Richard Sadler. The other nomination was for best original song, written by Claude Dubois and Dany Laferrière. The film did not win the awards.

== Works cited ==
- Marshall, Bill (2001). Quebec National Cinema. McGill–Queen's University Press. ISBN 0-7735-2103-8.
- Pallister, Janis (1995). The Cinema of Quebec: Masters in Their Own House. Associated University Presses. ISBN 0838635628.

== External reviews ==
- How to Make Love to a Negro Without Getting Tired at IMDb
