= Richard Sadler =

Richard Sadler (born March 18, 1947, in Montreal, Quebec, Canada) is a producer, scenarist and film director.

== Filmography ==
=== As a producer ===
- 1984 : The Gunrunner directed by Nardo Castillo
- 1989 : How to Make Love to a Negro Without Getting Tired (Comment faire l'amour avec un nègre sans se fatiguer) directed by Jacques W. Benoit
- 1991 : Scream of Stone (Cerro Torre: Schrei aus Stein) directed by Werner Herzog
- 1992 : Coyote directed by Richard Ciupka
- 1992 : Le mirage directed by Jean-Claude Guiguet
- 1994 : Louis 19, King of the Airwaves (Louis 19, le roi des ondes) directed by Michel Poulette
- 1996 : Caboose directed by Richard Roy
- 1997 : Le ciel est à nous directed by Graham Guit
- 1998 : Sucre amer directed by Christian Lara
- 1999 : EdTV de Ron Howard
- 2001 : Karmen Geï directed by Joseph Gaï Ramaka
- 2003 : Là-haut, un roi au-dessus des nuages directed by Pierre Schoendoerffer
- 2005 : Louise directed by Jacques Renard

=== As a scenarist ===
- 1969 : Valérie (Tendre et sensuelle Valérie) directed by Denis Héroux
- 1989 : How to Make Love to a Negro Without Getting Tired (Comment faire l'amour avec un nègre sans se fatiguer) directed by Jacques W. Benoit
- 1992 : Coyote directed by Richard Ciupka

=== As a director ===
- 1975 : Le Monde s'en vient à Québec

== Awards and nominations ==
=== Awards ===
- 1994 - Golden Reel Award (Highest Canadian box office) for Louis 19, King of the Airwaves (Louis 19, le roi des ondes)

=== Nominations ===
- 1990 - Genie Best screenplay adaptation How to Make Love to a Negro Without Getting Tired (Comment faire l'amour avec un nègre sans se fatiguer)
- 1994 - Genie Best motion picture Louis 19, King of the Airwaves (Louis 19, le roi des ondes)
