= René Lévesque (TV series) =

- Genre: Biographical drama
- Screenplay by: Clément Perron
- Directed by: Roger Cardinal
- No. of seasons: 1
- No. of episodes: 8

Production
- Producer: Claude Héroux
- Budget: 7 million CAD

Original release
- Network: TVA
- Release: March 8 – April 26, 1994

René Lévesque is a 1994 Canadian historical television series about the titular René Lévesque, a Quebec premier. It stars Denis Bouchard as Lévesque.

== Cast and characters ==
- Denis Bouchard as René Lévesque
- Maxime Collin as child René Lévesque
- Marie-Renée Patry as Lise Payette
- Raymond Bouchard as Jacques Parizeau
- Mario Bélanger as Claude Charron
- Jean L'Italien as Pierre Trudeau
- Emmanuel Charest as Jean Marchand
- Michèle Deslauriers as Judith Jasmin
- Pierre Chagnon Jean Lesage
- Michel Daigle as Jean Garon
- Sylvie Potvin as Lorraine Lagacé
- Linda Sorgini
- Marcel Leboeuf
- Élise Guilbault as Lévesque's mistress

== See also ==
- List of Quebec television series
- Television of Quebec
- Culture of Quebec
- Politics of Quebec
- History of Quebec
