= Margaret Langrick =

Canadian writer and retired actress (born 1971)

- Born: 1971 (age 54–55)
- Occupations: Writer, actress
- Years active: 1985–1996
- Website: www.maggielangrick.com

Margaret Langrick (born 1971) is a Canadian writer and retired actress. She is now known as Maggie Langrick, and is the CEO of the publishing company Wonderwell.

== Filmography ==
=== Films ===
- My American Cousin (1985) as Sandy Wilcox
- Harry and the Hendersons (1987) as Sarah Henderson
- Earth Star Voyager (1988) as Luz Sansone
- Martha, Ruth and Edie (1988) as Young Edie
- Cold Comfort (1989) as Dolores Lucas
- Thunderground (1989) as Casey
- American Boyfriends (1989) as Sandy Wilcox
- The Admiral and the Princess (1990) as voice of the Princess
- A Friend to Die For (also known as Death of a Cheerleader in the UK - 1994) as Jill Anderson
- Frankenstein: The College Years (1991)
- Sweet Angel Mine (1996) as Rauchine

=== Television ===
- Danger Bay TV series 1984-89 as Jenny (3 Episodes)
- Camp Wilder TV series 1992-93 as Beth (All 19 Episodes)
- Lonesome Dove: The Outlaw Years TV series 1995-96 as Selina (Ep 4 - Badlands, October 19, 1995)

== Awards and nominations ==
Year	Award	Category	Title of work	Result
1986	Genie Award	Best Performance by an Actress in a Leading Role	My American Cousin	Won
1987	Gemini Award	Best Guest Performance in a Series by an Actor or Actress	Danger Bay	Nominated
1988	Young Artist Award	Best Young Actress in a Motion Picture - Comedy	Harry and the Hendersons	Nominated
1989	Genie Award	Best Performance by an Actress in a Leading Role	Cold Comfort	Nominated
