= Anne Wheeler =

Canadian film director

Anne Wheeler OC
- Born: Dorothy Anne Wheeler; September 23, 1946 (age 79); Edmonton, Alberta, Canada
- Occupations: Film director Film producer Screenwriter, Short Story Writer
- Years active: 1975–present

Anne Wheeler, OC, (born September 23, 1946) is a Canadian film and television writer, producer, and director.

== Biography ==
After graduating in mathematics from the University of Alberta, Wheeler was a computer programmer before traveling abroad. Her years of travels inspired her to become a storyteller and when she returned she joined a group of old friends to form a film collective. From 1975 to 1985 she worked for the NFB where she made her first feature film, A War Story (1981), which was about her father, Ben Wheeler and his time as a doctor in a P.O.W. camp during World War II. The war is a common theme in her work and she revisited it later in her films Bye Bye Blues (1989) and The War Between Us (1995). Her first non-NFB film was Loyalties in 1986.

In addition to her films, Wheeler has directed episodes of Anne with an E, Private Eyes, Strange Empire, The Romeo Section, The Guard, This Is Wonderland, Da Vinci's Inquest, and Cold Squad.

== Awards and honors ==
Wheeler has been nominated four times for the Genie Award for Best Achievement in Direction for her films Loyalties (1986), Cowboys Don't Cry (1988), Bye Bye Blues (1989), and Suddenly Naked (2001). Her 1998 television miniseries, The Sleep Room, won Gemini awards for best television movie and best direction.

In 2017 Wheeler won a Leo Award for Best Direction (Television Film) for the Hallmark movie Stop the Wedding.

Wheeler was made an Officer of the Order of Canada in 1995. In 2012 she received the Queen Elizabeth II Diamond Jubilee Medal. Wheeler has also been awarded seven honorary doctorates and is the first woman to be given a Lifetime Achievement Award from the Directors Guild of Canada.

== Filmography ==
=== Film ===
Year	Title	Director	Writer	Producer
1986	Loyalties	Yes	Yes	No
1988	Cowboys Don't Cry	Yes	Yes	Yes
1989	Bye Bye Blues	Yes	Yes	Yes
1991	Angel Square	Yes	Yes	No
1999	Better Than Chocolate	Yes	No	No
2000	Marine Life	Yes	No	No
2001	Suddenly Naked	Yes	No	Executive
2002	Edge of Madness	Yes	Yes	No
2011	Knockout	Yes	No	No

Documentary film

Year	Title	Director	Writer	Producer
1975	Great Grand Mother	Yes	Yes	No
1976	Augusta	Yes	Yes	No
1981	A War Story	Yes	Yes	Yes
2000	The Orkney Lad: The Story of Isabel Gunn	Yes	No	No
2013	Chi	Yes	No	No
1977	Happily Unmarried	No	No	Yes
1978	Priory: The Only Home I've Got	No	No	Yes
1979	Triangle Island	No	No	Yes
1979	Welfare Mothers	No	No	Yes
1979	Never a Dull Moment	No	No	Yes
1983	Great Days in the Rockies	No	No	Yes
1983	From Bears to Bartok	No	No	Yes
1984	Children Of Alcohol	No	No	Yes
1984	This Is Only a Test	No	No	Yes

Short film

Year	Title	Director	Writer
1977	Happily Unmarried	Yes	No
1978	Teach Me to Dance	Yes	No
2000	Legs Apart	Yes	Yes

=== Television ===
TV movies

Year	Title	Director	Writer	Producer	Writer
1993	The Diviners	Yes	No	No	3-hour special
1993	Other Women's Children	Yes	No	No	
1995	The War Between Us	Yes	No	No	
1996	Mother Trucker: The Diana Kilmury Story	No	Yes	Yes	
2002	The Investigation	Yes	No	No	
2003	Betrayed	Yes	Yes	No	
2004	A Beachcombers Christmas	Yes	No	No	
2006	Christmas on Chestnut Street	Yes	No	No	
2007	Mom, Dad and Her	Yes	No	No	
2008	Mail Order Bride	Yes	No	No	
2008	Living Out Loud	Yes	No	No	
2008	Dancing Trees (Partners in Crime)	Yes	No	No	
2009	The Gambler, the Girl and the Gunslinger	Yes	No	No	
2012	The Horses of McBride	Yes	No	No	
2014	The Color of Rain	Yes	No	No	
2015	A Country Wedding	Yes	No	No	
2016	Stop the Wedding	Yes	No	No	Best Direction, 2017 Leo Awards
2023	Friends & Family Christmas	Yes	No	No	

TV series

Year	Title	Notes
1984	For the Record	Episode 46: A Change of Heart
1984-1985	Global Playhouse	Episodes One's a Heifer and To Set Our House in Order (Also writer)
1985	The Ray Bradbury Theater	Episode The Martian
1990	Mom P.I.	2 episodes
1992	North of 60	2 episodes
1995	Jake and the Kid	2 episodes
1996	The Adventures of Shirley Holmes	Pilot
1998	Cold Squad	3 episodes
1998	The Sleep Room	Miniseries
1998-2003	Da Vinci's Inquest	7 episodes
2000	Mysterious Ways	Episode 6:Twins
2000	Beggars and Choosers	1 episode
2004-2005	This Is Wonderland	8 episodes
2005	Godiva's	2 episode
2006	Jozi-H	2 episodes
2006	The Guard	2 episodes
2014	Heartland	Episodes 5: Endings and Beginnings and 6: Steal Away
2014	When Calls the Heart	Episode 9: Change of Heart
2021	Firefly Lane	Episodes 3: Dancing Queens and 4: Love is a Battlefield

== See also ==
- List of female film and television directors
- List of LGBT-related films directed by women
