= François Bouvier =

Canadian film and television director

François Bouvier is a Canadian film and television director from Quebec.

He was a Genie Award nominee for Best Director at the 11th Genie Awards in 1990 for Unfaithful Mornings (Les Matins infidèles), and for Best Adapted Screenplay at the 20th Genie Awards in 1999 for Winter Stories (Histoires d'hiver). He also received two Jutra Award nominations for Winter Stories at the 2nd Jutra Awards, for Best Director and Best Screenplay.

== Filmography ==
- Jacques and November (Jacques et novembre) - 1984
- Unfaithful Mornings (Les Matins infidèles) - 1989
- Les Pots cassés - 1993
- Winter Stories (Histoires d'hiver) - 1999
- Maman Last Call - 2005
- Paul à Québec - 2015
- La Bolduc - 2018
- Victoire (La Cordonnière) - 2023
