= List of Canadian films of 1978 =

This is a list of Canadian films which were released in 1978:

Title	Director	Cast	Genre	Notes
Afterlife	Ishu Patel		NFB animated short	Canadian Film Award – Animated Short; Annecy International Animated Film Festival – Grand Prize
All Nothing (Tout rien)	Frédéric Back		Animated short	
Angela	Boris Sagal	Sophia Loren, Steve Railsback	Drama	
The Backstreet Six (Comme les six doigts de la main)	André Melançon		Comedy	
Bears and Man	Bill Schmalz		Documentary	
Blackout	Eddy Matalon	Ray Milland, June Allyson, James Mitchum, Robert Carradine	Thriller	
Blood and Guts	Paul Lynch	William Smith, Henry Beckman, Micheline Lanctôt	Sports drama	
Blood Relatives	Claude Chabrol	Donald Sutherland, Aude Landry, Stéphane Audran		
The Bronswik Affair (L'Affaire Bronswik)	Robert Awad, André Leduc		Animated mockumentary	
The Devil and Daniel Mouse	Clive A. Smith		Animated	
Drying Up the Streets	Robin Spry	Don Francks, Len Cariou, Sarah Torgov, August Schellenberg	Crime drama	
Fields of Endless Day	Terence Macartney-Filgate		Documentary	
The Guardian Angel (L'Ange gardien)	Jacques Fournier	Margaret Trudeau, André Falcon, Francis Lemaire	Romantic comedy	
Harness the Wind	Sidney Goldsmith	Michael Kane	Short documentary	
Healing	Pierre Lasry		Documentary	
Heavy Horse Pull	Roberta King, Ronald Squire		Short documentary	
High-Ballin'	Peter Carter	Peter Fonda, Jerry Reed, Helen Shaver	Comedy	
Home to Stay	Delbert Mann	Henry Fonda, Frances Hyland	Drama	
I, Maureen	Janine Manatis	Colleen Collins, Michael Ironside	Drama	
I Miss You, Hugs and Kisses	Murray Markowitz	Elke Sommer, Donald Pilon, Chuck Shamata	Mystery	
In Praise of Older Women	George Kaczender	Tom Berenger, Karen Black, Susan Strasberg	Drama based on the novel by Stephen Vizinczey	
Jacob Two-Two Meets the Hooded Fang	Theodore J. Flicker		Children's	
The Last Pogo	Colin Brunton	Teenage Head, The Viletones	Documentary	
The Manitou	William Girdler	Tony Curtis, Susan Strasberg	Horror	
Marie-Anne	Martin Walters	Andrée Pelletier, John Juliani, Tantoo Cardinal, Gordon Tootoosis	Historical drama	
One Night Stand	Allan King	Brent Carver, Chapelle Jaffe	Drama based on a play by Carol Bolt	Canadian Film Award – Non-Feature Actor (Craver), Non-Feature Actress (Jaffe), Non-Feature Musical Score
Power Play	Martyn Burke	Peter O’Toole, David Hemmings, Donald Pleasence, Barry Morse	Political drama	Canadian Film Award – Screenplay; Canada-U.K. co-production
Priory: The Only Home I've Got	Mark Dolgoy		Documentary	Genie Award winner for Best Short Documentary
Running Time	Mort Ransen	Jackie Burroughs, David Balser, Gerard Parkes	Drama	
The Silent Partner	Daryl Duke	Elliott Gould, Christopher Plummer, Susannah York	Crime, thriller	
Soils of Canada	Gilles Blais		Documentary	
Song of the Paddle	Bill Mason		NFB short	Canadian Film Award – Non-Feature Direction, Non-Feature Cinematography, Non-Feature Sound
Special Delivery	Eunice Macauley, John Weldon		NFB animated short	Academy Award for animated short
The Third Walker	Teri McLuhan	Colleen Dewhurst, William Shatner, Monique Mercure	Drama	
Three Card Monte	Les Rose	Richard Gabourie, Chris Langevin, Lynne Cavanagh		
Tomorrow Never Comes	Peter Collinson	Oliver Reed, Susan George, Raymond Burr	Crime drama	Canada-U.K. co-production
Two Solitudes	Lionel Chetwynd	Jean-Pierre Aumont, Stacy Keach, Gloria Carlin, Chris Wiggins, Claude Jutra	Drama based on the novel by Hugh MacLennan	
Tyler	Ralph L. Thomas	R. H. Thomson, Murray Westgate	Drama	
Violette Nozière	Claude Chabrol	Isabelle Huppert, Stéphane Audran, Jean Carmet	Crime drama based on a true story	Canada-France co-production directed by Claude Chabrol
Why Me?	Janet Perlman		Animated	
Xenogenesis	James Cameron		Science fiction	

== See also ==
- 1978 in Canada
- 1978 in Canadian television
