= 29th Canadian Film Awards =

Final Canadian Film Awards ceremony

- Date: September 21, 1978
- Location: Ryerson Theatre, Toronto
- Hosted by: John Candy, Catherine O'Hara

Highlights
- Most nominations: In Praise of Older Women
- Best Motion Picture: The Silent Partner

The 29th Canadian Film Awards were held on September 21, 1978 to honour achievements in Canadian film. They were the last Canadian Film Awards ceremony to be held before the program was taken over by the Academy of Canadian Cinema and Television, and restructured into the new Genie Awards.

This year's awards had nearly been cancelled. Members of the Canadian Association of Motion Picture Producers (CAMPP), who were not happy with the CFA's jury system, insisted on an academy-style system where all members received nominated rights for the Best Feature Film category. They threatened to withdraw all member films from competition. When CFA chairman Julius Kohanyi agreed to the change, ACTRA withdrew its participation, charging that the change was hasty and impractical. Eventually, CAMPP agreed to a proposal which allowed its members two votes for Best Feature Film in the pre-selection stage, while the other associations received one vote in each category.

In addition, the CFA board introduced a Co-Production category, for films co-produced by Canadian and foreign producers. When added to the 136 entries in 31 categories, this made pre-selection more difficult. The bigger problem was that the CFA's own rules did not allow any film crew members on co-productions to receive craft awards. Lawyers for the co-produced film Power Play obtained a court injunction which blocked the CFA presentation unless the Canadian craftspeople on the film were considered eligible for awards. The situation was resolved by moving Power Play to the Feature Film category; the co-production category was scrapped.

The ceremony was hosted by John Candy and Catherine O'Hara, and was held at the conclusion of the 1978 Festival of Festivals. The CBC broadcast a one-hour special featuring highlights of the show.

== Films ==
Best Feature Film	Best Theatrical Short
The Silent Partner — Carolco Pictures, Joel B. Michaels, Stephen Young and Garth Drabinsky producers, Daryl Duke director; Blood and Guts — Melvin Simon Productions and Quadrant Films, Peter O'Brian and John Hunter producers, Paul Lynch director; In Praise of Older Women — Astral Bellevue Pathé and RSL Films, Robert Lantos and Claude Héroux producers, George Kaczender director; Three Card Monte — Regenthall Films, Rob Iveson and Richard Gabourie producers, Les Rose director	The Bronswik Affair (L'Affaire Bronswik) – National Film Board of Canada, René Jodoin producer, Robert Awad and André Leduc directors
Best Documentary Under 30 Minutes	Best Documentary Over 30 Minutes
The Hottest Show on Earth – National Film Board of Canada, Wolf Koenig, Derek Lamb and Jeffrey Schon producers, Terence Macartney-Filgate, Wolf Koenig and Derek Lamb directors; Return of the Reluctant Prodigy - CBC, Les Rose producer and director; Song of the Paddle – National Film Board of Canada, William Brind and Marrin Canell producers, Bill Mason director; The World of Noel Coward - Neil Sutherland producer and director	The Champions – National Film Board of Canada and Canadian Broadcasting Corporation, Donald Brittain and Janet Leissner producers, Donald Brittain director; Fields of Endless Day – National Film Board of Canada, Terence Macartney-Filgate, Nick Ketchum, Beryl Fox and Jennifer Hodge de Silva producers, Terence Macartney-Filgate director; Healing – National Film Board of Canada, Michael McKennirey producer, Pierre Lasry director; The Prophet from Pugwash – Canadian Broadcasting Corporation, Carol Moore-Ede producer and director
Best Animated Film	Best TV Drama
Afterlife – National Film Board of Canada, Derek Lamb producer, Ishu Patel director; Blowhard – National Film Board of Canada, Jerry Krepakevich and Derek Mazur producers, Brad Caslor and Christopher Hinton directors; The Devil and Daniel Mouse – Nelvana, Michael Hirsh, Patrick Loubert, J. Gordon Arnold and Ron Hastings producers, Clive A. Smith director; Harness the Wind – National Film Board of Canada, Derek Lamb producer, Sidney Goldsmith director	One Night Stand – Canadian Broadcasting Corporation and Allan King Associates, Allan King producer and director; The Machine Age (L'Âge de la machine) – National Film Board of Canada, Jacques Bobet producer, Gilles Carle director; For the Record: A Matter of Choice – Canadian Broadcasting Corporation, Francis Mankiewicz director; The War Is Over – National Film Board of Canada, Malca Gillson producer, René Bonnière director

== Feature film craft awards ==
Best Performance by a Lead Actor	Best Performance by a Lead Actress
Richard Gabourie, Three Card Monte; John Juliani, Marie-Anne (Canadian Film Production Co.); Frank Moore, The Third Walker (Melvin Simon Productions/Quadrant Films); Christopher Plummer, The Silent Partner	Helen Shaver, In Praise of Older Women; Micheline Lanctôt, Blood and Guts; Celine Lomez, The Silent Partner; Andrée Pelletier, Marie-Anne
Best Supporting Actor	Best Supporting Actress
Henry Beckman, Blood and Guts; Michael Ironside, I, Maureen (Jandu Productions); Robert MacKay, I, Maureen	Marilyn Lightstone, In Praise of Older Women; Lynne Cavanagh, Three Card Monte; Monique Mercure, The Third Walker; Alberta Watson, In Praise of Older Women
Best Art Direction	Best Cinematography
Wolf Kroeger, In Praise of Older Women; Reuben Freed, Blood and Guts; Tony Hall, Three Card Monte; Trevor Williams, The Silent Partner	Miklós Lente, In Praise of Older Women; Marc Champion, I, Maureen; Mark Irwin, Blood and Guts
Best Direction	Best Music Score
Daryl Duke, The Silent Partner; Paul Lynch, Blood and Guts; George Kaczender, In Praise of Older Women; Les Rose,- Three Card Monte	Oscar Peterson, The Silent Partner; Paul Zaza and Jim Caverhill, Three Card Monte; Paul Hoffert, The Third Walker; Maurice Marshall, Marie-Anne
Best Film Editing	Best Sound Editing
George Appleby, The Silent Partner; William Gray, Blood and Guts; George Kaczender, In Praise of Older Women; Ron Wisman, Three Card Monte	Bruce Nyznik, The Silent Partner; Les Halman, In Praise of Older Women; Chris Large, Marie-Anne; Ronald Sanders, Blood and Guts
Best Overall Sound	Best Original Screenplay
David Lee (recording), The Silent Partner; Tony van den Akker and Paul Coombe (re-recording), Three Card Monte; Paul Gottlieb, In Praise of Older Women; Joseph McBride, William Gray and John Hunter, Blood and Guts	Martyn Burke, Power Play (Magnum International Productions, The Rank Organisation); Richard Gabourie, Three Card Monte; William Gray and John Hunter, Blood and Guts

== Non-feature craft awards ==
Best Performance by a Lead Actor	Best Performance by a Lead Actress
Brent Carver, One Night Stand; Gabriel Arcand, The Machine Age (L'Âge de la machine); Gary Reineke, For the Record: A Matter of Choice; R. H. Thomson, Tyler (CBC)	Chapelle Jaffe, One Night Stand; Sylvie Lachance, The Machine Age (L'Âge de la machine); Roberta Maxwell, For the Record: A Matter of Choice; Sarah Torgov, Drying Up the Streets (CBC)
Best Supporting Actor or Actress	Best Art Direction
Willie Lamothe, The Machine Age (L'Âge de la machine)	Jocelyn Joly, The Machine Age (L'Âge de la machine)
Best Direction - Dramatic	Best Direction – Non-Dramatic
Gilles Carle, The Machine Age (L'Âge de la machine); René Bonnière, The War Is Over; Allan King, One Night Stand; Francis Mankiewicz, A Matter of Choice	Bill Mason, Song of the Paddle; Terence Macartney-Filgate, Derek Lamb and Wolf Koenig, The Hottest Show on Earth; Les Rose, The Return of the Reluctant Prodigy; Neil Sutherland, The World of Noel Coward
Best Cinematography	Best Music Score
Ken Buck, Song of the Paddle; Pierre Letarte, The Machine Age (L'Âge de la machine)	Brent Carver, Carole Pope, Kevan Staples and Carol Bolt, One Night Stand
Best Film Editing	Best Sound Editing
Ted Remerowski and Steven Kellar, The Champions	John Knight and Ken Page, Song of the Paddle
Best Sound Recording	Best Sound Re-recording
Serge Beauchemin, The Machine Age (L'Âge de la machine)	Michel Descombes and Jean-Pierre Joutel, The Champions
Best Screenplay	Best Non-Dramatic Script
Gilles Carle, The Machine Age (L'Âge de la machine)	Donald Brittain, The Champions

== Special awards ==
- Nelvana - Michael Hirsh, Patrick Loubert and Clive A. Smith - “for development in animation”.
- Golden Reel Award: Allan King, Who Has Seen the Wind - "for highest-grossing film".
- Wendy Michener Award: Richard Gabourie – for outstanding achievement in his first feature, Three Card Monte.
- John Grierson Award: Donald Brittain – for outstanding contributions to Canadian cinema.
