= 1978 Toronto International Film Festival =

Annual Canadian film festival

- Festival poster
- Opening film: In Praise of Older Women
- Location: Toronto, Ontario, Canada
- Hosted by: Toronto International Film Festival Group
- No. of films: 85 feature films
- Festival date: September 14, 1978–September 21, 1978
- Language: English
- Website: tiff.net
- 1979 1977

The 3rd Toronto International Film Festival (TIFF) took place in Toronto, Ontario, Canada between September 14 and September 21, 1978. It showcased 85 films, the lowest number of films in the festival's history. In Praise of Older Women directed by George Kaczender was selected as the opening film. When the Ontario Film Review Board objected to a 40-second scene between Marilyn Lightstone and Tom Berenger, co-producer of the film Robert Lantos cut the scene for the theatrical run. Despite that, some of the TIFF staff managed to smuggle original uncut version of the film and run it into the theatre. The news was well publicised, increasing interest in the film, in turn boosting ticket sales. Difficulties arose when audiences waiting outside the theatre noticed that each ticket admitted two person thus causing anger in the crowd. The audience who were not able to get seats during the first screening were invited to a later screening. The People's Choice Award was introduced this year, which is given to a feature film chosen by a vote of the festival audience.

Louis Malle's film Pretty Baby was banned by the OFRB, due to its sensitive subject matter.

The festival also partnered with the Canadian Film Awards to present the 29th Canadian Film Awards as a festival event, with the festival in turn screening all of the nominated films.

== Awards ==
Award	Film	Director
People's Choice Award	Girlfriends	Claudia Weill

== Programme ==
=== Gala Presentations ===
English title	Original title	Director(s)	Production country
Bloodbrothers		Robert Mulligan	United States
The Chant of Jimmie Blacksmith		Fred Schepisi	Australia
The Chess Players	Shatranj Ke Khilari	Satyajit Ray	India
The Getting of Wisdom		Bruce Beresford	Australia
Girlfriends		Claudia Weill	United States
The Glass Cell	Die gläserne Zelle	Hans W. Geißendörfer	West Germany
In Praise of Older Women		George Kaczender	Canada
Midnight Express		Alan Parker	United Kingdom, United States
Nunzio		Paul Williams	United States
Peppermint Soda	Diabolo menthe	Diane Kurys	France
The Song of Roland	Le Chanson de Roland	Frank Cassenti	France
Violette Nozière		Claude Chabrol	France, Canada
Who Is Killing the Great Chefs of Europe?		Ted Kotcheff	United States, West Germany

=== Canadian Cinema ===
English title	Original title	Director(s)	Production country
Blood and Guts		Paul Lynch	Canada
I, Maureen		Janine Manatis	Canada
Marie-Anne		Martin Walters	Canada
Power Play		Martyn Burke	Canada, United Kingdom
The Silent Partner		Daryl Duke	Canada
The Third Walker		Teri McLuhan	Canada
Three Card Monte		Les Rose	Canada

=== Documentaries ===
English title	Original title	Director(s)	Production country
Movies Are My Life		Peter Hayden	United Kingdom
Roger Corman: Hollywood's Wild Angel		Christian Blackwood	United States
The Last Tasmanian		Tom Haydon	Australia

=== Other films ===
English title	Original title	Director(s)	Production country
The Abdication		Anthony Harvey	United Kingdom
Alambrista!		Robert M. Young	United States
Angel City		Jon Jost	United States
A Bigger Splash		Jack Hazan	United Kingdom
The Consequence	Die Konsequenz	Wolfgang Petersen	West Germany
The Cycle	Dayereh-ye Mina	Dariush Mehrjui	Iran
In Search of Anna		Esben Storm	Australia
Inserts		John Byrum	United Kingdom
The Last Three Days	Gli ultimi tre giorni	Gianfranco Mingozzi	Italy
Mouth to Mouth		John Duigan	Australia
The Night the Prowler		Jim Sharman	Australia
Padre Padrone		Paolo Taviani, Vittorio Taviani	Italy
La Paloma		Daniel Schmid	France, Switzerland
The Paradise Lost	Het verloren paradijs	Harry Kümel	Netherlands
The Picture Show Man		John Power	Australia
Play It as It Lays		Frank Perry	United States
The Spider's Stratagem	Strategia del ragno	Bernardo Bertolucci	Italy
Tonight or Never	Questa notte o mai	Daniel Schmid	Switzerland
Why Not!	Pourquoi pas!	Coline Serreau	France
