= Canadian Screen Award for Best Supporting Actor =

Annual film award (1970–2021)

The Academy of Canadian Cinema and Television presents an annual award for Best Performance by an Actor in a Supporting Role to the best performance by a supporting actor in a Canadian film. The award was first presented in 1970 by the Canadian Film Awards, and was presented annually until 1978 with the exception of 1974 due to the cancellation of the awards that year.

From 1980 until 2012, the award was presented as part of the Genie Awards ceremony; since 2013, it has been presented as part of the new Canadian Screen Awards.

In August 2022, the Academy announced that it will discontinue its past practice of presenting gendered awards for film and television actors and actresses; beginning with the 11th Canadian Screen Awards in 2023, gender-neutral awards for Best Performance will be presented, with eight nominees per category instead of five. Supporting performances are now honoured with the Canadian Screen Award for Best Supporting Performance in a Film.

== 1970s ==
Year	Nominee	Film	Ref
1970; 22nd Canadian Film Awards
1970; 22nd Canadian Film Awards	Gratien Gélinas	Red	
1971; 23rd Canadian Film Awards
1971; 23rd Canadian Film Awards	Danny Freedman	Fortune and Men's Eyes	
1972; 24th Canadian Film Awards
1972; 24th Canadian Film Awards	Donald Pilon	The True Nature of Bernadette (La Vraie Nature de Bernadette)	
1973; 25th Canadian Film Awards
1973; 25th Canadian Film Awards	Willie Lamothe	The Death of a Lumberjack (La Mort d'un bûcheron)	
1974
1974	No award presented		
1975; 26th Canadian Film Awards
1975; 26th Canadian Film Awards	Henry Beckman	Why Rock the Boat?	
1976; 27th Canadian Film Awards
1976; 27th Canadian Film Awards	Frank Moore	The Far Shore	
1977; 28th Canadian Film Awards
1977; 28th Canadian Film Awards	Jean Lapointe	One Man	
1978; 29th Canadian Film Awards
1978; 29th Canadian Film Awards	Henry Beckman	Blood and Guts	
1978; 29th Canadian Film Awards	Michael Ironside	I, Maureen	
1978; 29th Canadian Film Awards	Robert MacKay	I, Maureen	

== 1980s ==
Year	Nominee	Film	Ref
1980; 1st Genie Awards
1980; 1st Genie Awards	Gordon Pinsent	Jack London's Klondike Fever	
1980; 1st Genie Awards	Harvey Atkin	Meatballs	
1980; 1st Genie Awards	Lawrence Dane	Running	
1980; 1st Genie Awards	Chris Makepeace	Meatballs	
1980; 1st Genie Awards	Saul Rubinek	Agency	
1980; 1st Genie Awards	Robert A. Silverman	The Brood	
1981; 2nd Genie Awards
1981; 2nd Genie Awards	Germain Houde	Good Riddance (Les Bons débarras)	
1981; 2nd Genie Awards	Gabriel Arcand	Suzanne	
1981; 2nd Genie Awards	David Ferry	The Hounds of Notre Dame	
1981; 2nd Genie Awards	Robert Joy	Atlantic City, U.S.A.	
1981; 2nd Genie Awards	John Marley	Tribute	
1982; 3rd Genie Awards
1982; 3rd Genie Awards	Saul Rubinek	Ticket to Heaven	
1982; 3rd Genie Awards	Nicholas Campbell	The Amateur	
1982; 3rd Genie Awards	Émile Genest	The Plouffe Family (Les Plouffe)	
1982; 3rd Genie Awards	Michael Ironside	Scanners	
1982; 3rd Genie Awards	R. H. Thomson	Ticket to Heaven	
1983; 4th Genie Awards
1983; 4th Genie Awards	R. H. Thomson	If You Could See What I Hear	
1983; 4th Genie Awards	Nicholas Campbell	The Man in 5A	
1983; 4th Genie Awards	Doug McGrath	Porky's	
1983; 4th Genie Awards	Gary Reineke	The Grey Fox	
1983; 4th Genie Awards	Wayne Robson	The Grey Fox	
1984; 5th Genie Awards
1984; 5th Genie Awards	Michael Zelniker	The Terry Fox Story	
1984; 5th Genie Awards	Les Carlson	Videodrome	
1984; 5th Genie Awards	Pierre Curzi	Maria Chapdelaine	
1984; 5th Genie Awards	Peter Dvorsky	Videodrome	
1984; 5th Genie Awards	Kenneth Welsh	Tell Me That You Love Me	
1985; 6th Genie Awards
1985; 6th Genie Awards	Alan Scarfe	The Bay Boy	
1985; 6th Genie Awards	John Cooper	My Kind of Town	
1985; 6th Genie Awards	Peter Donat	The Bay Boy	
1985; 6th Genie Awards	Donald Pilon	The Crime of Ovide Plouffe (Le Crime d'Ovide Plouffe)	
1985; 6th Genie Awards	Peter Spence	Unfinished Business	
1986; 7th Genie Awards
1986; 7th Genie Awards	Alan Arkin	Joshua Then and Now	
1986; 7th Genie Awards	Richard Donat	My American Cousin	
1986; 7th Genie Awards	Duncan Fraser	Overnight	
1986; 7th Genie Awards	Sam Grana	90 Days	
1986; 7th Genie Awards	Sean Sullivan	The Boy in Blue	
1987; 8th Genie Awards
1987; 8th Genie Awards	Gabriel Arcand	The Decline of the American Empire (Le Déclin de l'empire américain)	
1987; 8th Genie Awards	Robert Gravel	Intimate Power (Pouvoir intime)	
1987; 8th Genie Awards	Roland Hewgill	John and the Missus	
1987; 8th Genie Awards	Tom Jackson	Loyalties	
1987; 8th Genie Awards	Yves Jacques	The Decline of the American Empire (Le Déclin de l'empire américain)	
1988; 9th Genie Awards
1988; 9th Genie Awards	Germain Houde	Night Zoo (Un Zoo la nuit)	
1988; 9th Genie Awards	Hrant Alianak	Family Viewing	
1988; 9th Genie Awards	Leon Dubinsky	Life Classes	
1988; 9th Genie Awards	Tony Nardi	Concrete Angels	
1988; 9th Genie Awards	Murray Westgate	Blue City Slammers	
1989; 10th Genie Awards
1989; 10th Genie Awards	Rémy Girard	The Revolving Doors (Les Portes tournantes)	
1989; 10th Genie Awards	Maury Chaykin	Iron Eagle II	
1989; 10th Genie Awards	Ron James	Something About Love	
1989; 10th Genie Awards	Michael Rudder	Buying Time	

== 1990s ==
Year	Nominee	Film	Ref
1990; 11th Genie Awards
1990; 11th Genie Awards	Rémy Girard	Jesus of Montreal (Jésus de Montréal)	
1990; 11th Genie Awards	Don McKellar	Roadkill	
1990; 11th Genie Awards	Michael Ontkean	Bye Bye Blues	
1990; 11th Genie Awards	Gilles Pelletier	Jesus of Montreal (Jésus de Montréal)	
1990; 11th Genie Awards	Wayne Robson	Bye Bye Blues	
1991; 12th Genie Awards
1991; 12th Genie Awards	August Schellenberg	Black Robe	
1991; 12th Genie Awards	Michael Hogan	Diplomatic Immunity	
1991; 12th Genie Awards	Julien Poulin	The Party (Le Party)	
1991; 12th Genie Awards	Michael Riley	Diplomatic Immunity	
1991; 12th Genie Awards	Paul Soles	Falling Over Backwards	
1992; 13th Genie Awards
1992; 13th Genie Awards	Michael Hogan	Solitaire	
1992; 13th Genie Awards	Jean-Guy Bouchard	Requiem for a Handsome Bastard (Requiem pour un beau sans-coeur)	
1992; 13th Genie Awards	Tano Cimarosa	The Saracen Woman (La Sarrasine)	
1992; 13th Genie Awards	Robbie Coltrane	Oh, What a Night	
1992; 13th Genie Awards	Andrew Miller	Oh, What a Night	
1993; 14th Genie Awards
1993; 14th Genie Awards	Kevin Tighe	I Love a Man in Uniform	
1993; 14th Genie Awards	Jim Byrnes	Harmony Cats	
1993; 14th Genie Awards	Yvan Canuel	La Florida	
1993; 14th Genie Awards	Tobie Pelletier	The Sex of the Stars (Le Sexe des étoiles)	
1993; 14th Genie Awards	Christopher Plummer	Impolite	
1994; 15th Genie Awards
1994; 15th Genie Awards	Don McKellar	Exotica	
1994; 15th Genie Awards	Matthew Ferguson	Love and Human Remains	
1994; 15th Genie Awards	Scott Kraft	For the Moment	
1994; 15th Genie Awards	Callum Keith Rennie	Double Happiness	
1994; 15th Genie Awards	Michel Rivard	My Friend Max (Mon amie Max)	
1995; 16th Genie Awards
1995; 16th Genie Awards	Kenneth Welsh	Margaret's Museum	
1995; 16th Genie Awards	Robert Brouillette	Eldorado	
1995; 16th Genie Awards	David Fox	When Night Is Falling	
1995; 16th Genie Awards	Clark Johnson	Rude	
1995; 16th Genie Awards	Aubert Pallascio	Black List (Liste noire)	
1996; 17th Genie Awards
1996; 17th Genie Awards	Peter Donaldson	Long Day's Journey into Night	
1996; 17th Genie Awards	Alexander Chapman	Lilies	
1996; 17th Genie Awards	James Hyndman	Rowing Through	
1996; 17th Genie Awards	Sean McCann	Swann	
1996; 17th Genie Awards	Ron White	Screamers	
1997; 18th Genie Awards
1997; 18th Genie Awards	Peter MacNeill	The Hanging Garden	
1997; 18th Genie Awards	Frédéric Desager	The Countess of Baton Rouge (La Comtesse de Bâton Rouge)	
1997; 18th Genie Awards	Hardee T. Lineham	Shoemaker	
1997; 18th Genie Awards	Tom McCamus	The Sweet Hereafter	
1998; 19th Genie Awards
1998; 19th Genie Awards	Callum Keith Rennie	Last Night	
1998; 19th Genie Awards	Kurush Deboo	Such a Long Journey	
1998; 19th Genie Awards	Michael Riley	Pale Saints	
1998; 19th Genie Awards	Saul Rubinek	Pale Saints	
1998; 19th Genie Awards	George Wendt	Rupert's Land	
1999; 20th Genie Awards
1999; 20th Genie Awards	Mark McKinney	Dog Park	
1999; 20th Genie Awards	Gabriel Arcand	The Big Snake of the World (Le Grand Serpent du monde)	
1999; 20th Genie Awards	James Frain	Sunshine	
1999; 20th Genie Awards	William Hurt	Sunshine	
1999; 20th Genie Awards	Alex Ivanovici	Winter Stories (Histoires d'hiver)	

== 2000s ==
Year	Nominee	Film	Ref
2000; 21st Genie Awards
2000; 21st Genie Awards	Martin Cummins	Love Come Down	
2000; 21st Genie Awards	Ian Bannen	To Walk with Lions	
2000; 21st Genie Awards	Nicholas Campbell	New Waterford Girl	
2000; 21st Genie Awards	Patrick Huard	Life After Love (La Vie après l'amour)	
2000; 21st Genie Awards	Jean-Nicolas Verreault	Maelström	
2001; 22nd Genie Awards
2001; 22nd Genie Awards	Vincent Gale	Last Wedding	
2001; 22nd Genie Awards	Loren Dean	The War Bride	
2001; 22nd Genie Awards	Michel Forget	The Woman Who Drinks (La Femme qui boit)	
2001; 22nd Genie Awards	Julian Richings	The Claim	
2001; 22nd Genie Awards	Tom Scholte	Last Wedding	
2002; 23rd Genie Awards
2002; 23rd Genie Awards	Elias Koteas	Ararat	
2002; 23rd Genie Awards	Ranjit Chowdhry	Bollywood/Hollywood	
2002; 23rd Genie Awards	Dominic Darceuil	Inside (Histoire de pen)	
2002; 23rd Genie Awards	Brendan Fletcher	Turning Paige	
2002; 23rd Genie Awards	Gabriel Gascon	The Marsh (Le Marais)	
2003; 24th Genie Awards
2003; 24th Genie Awards	Stéphane Rousseau	The Barbarian Invasions (Les Invasions barbares)	
2003; 24th Genie Awards	Benoît Brière	Seducing Doctor Lewis (La Grande séduction)	
2003; 24th Genie Awards	Roy Dupuis	Séraphin: Heart of Stone (Séraphin: un homme et son péché)	
2003; 24th Genie Awards	David Hayman	The Wild Dogs	
2003; 24th Genie Awards	Christopher Plummer	Blizzard	
2004; 25th Genie Awards
2004; 25th Genie Awards	Jean Lapointe	The Last Tunnel (Le Dernier tunnel)	
2004; 25th Genie Awards	Gary Farmer	Twist	
2004; 25th Genie Awards	Brendan Fehr	Sugar	
2004; 25th Genie Awards	Bruce Greenwood	Being Julia	
2004; 25th Genie Awards	Kyle MacLachlan	Touch of Pink	
2005; 26th Genie Awards
2005; 26th Genie Awards	Denis Bernard	Audition (L'Audition)	
2005; 26th Genie Awards	Rémy Girard	Aurore	
2005; 26th Genie Awards	Gordon Pinsent	Saint Ralph	
2005; 26th Genie Awards	Campbell Scott	Saint Ralph	
2005; 26th Genie Awards	Bernard Starlight	Hank Williams First Nation	
2006; 27th Genie Awards
2006; 27th Genie Awards	Stephen McHattie	The Rocket (Maurice Richard)	
2006; 27th Genie Awards	Hugh Dillon	Trailer Park Boys: The Movie	
2006; 27th Genie Awards	Robert Joy	Whole New Thing	
2006; 27th Genie Awards	Lester Chit-Man Chan	Eve and the Fire Horse	
2006; 27th Genie Awards	Michel Muller	The Little Book of Revenge (Guide de la petite vengeance)	
2007; 28th Genie Awards
2007; 28th Genie Awards	Armin Mueller-Stahl	Eastern Promises	
2007; 28th Genie Awards	Danny Glover	Poor Boy's Game	
2007; 28th Genie Awards	Guillaume Lemay-Thivierge	The 3 L'il Pigs (Les 3 p'tits cochons)	
2007; 28th Genie Awards	Michel-Ange Nzojibwami	Shake Hands With the Devil	
2007; 28th Genie Awards	Gilbert Sicotte	Continental, a Film Without Guns (Continental, un film sans fusil)	
2008; 29th Genie Awards
2008; 29th Genie Awards	Callum Keith Rennie	Normal	
2008; 29th Genie Awards	Normand D'Amour	Everything Is Fine (Tout est parfait)	
2008; 29th Genie Awards	Benoît McGinnis	Le Banquet	
2008; 29th Genie Awards	Rade Šerbedžija	Fugitive Pieces	
2008; 29th Genie Awards	Max von Sydow	Emotional Arithmetic	
2009; 30th Genie Awards
2009; 30th Genie Awards	Maxim Gaudette	Polytechnique	
2009; 30th Genie Awards	Patrick Drolet	Father and Guns (De père en flic)	
2009; 30th Genie Awards	John Dunsworth	Trailer Park Boys: Countdown to Liquor Day	
2009; 30th Genie Awards	Rémy Girard	Father and Guns (De père en flic)	
2009; 30th Genie Awards	Scott Speedman	Adoration	

== 2010s ==
Year	Nominee	Film	Ref
2010; 31st Genie Awards
2010; 31st Genie Awards	Dustin Hoffman	Barney's Version	
2010; 31st Genie Awards	Martin Dubreuil	10½	
2010; 31st Genie Awards	Alexis Martin	Route 132	
2010; 31st Genie Awards	Callum Keith Rennie	Gunless	
2010; 31st Genie Awards	Rossif Sutherland	High Life	
2011; 32nd Genie Awards
2011; 32nd Genie Awards	Viggo Mortensen	A Dangerous Method	
2011; 32nd Genie Awards	Antoine Bertrand	Starbuck	
2011; 32nd Genie Awards	Kevin Durand	Citizen Gangster	
2011; 32nd Genie Awards	Marin Gerrier	Café de Flore	
2011; 32nd Genie Awards	Taylor Kitsch	The Bang Bang Club	
2012; 1st Canadian Screen Awards
2012; 1st Canadian Screen Awards	Serge Kanyinda	War Witch (Rebelle)	
2012; 1st Canadian Screen Awards	Jay Baruchel	Goon	
2012; 1st Canadian Screen Awards	Kim Coates	Goon	
2012; 1st Canadian Screen Awards	Stephan James	Home Again	
2012; 1st Canadian Screen Awards	Elias Koteas	Winnie	
2013; 2nd Canadian Screen Awards
2013; 2nd Canadian Screen Awards	Gordon Pinsent	The Grand Seduction	
2013; 2nd Canadian Screen Awards	Jay Baruchel	The Art of the Steal	
2013; 2nd Canadian Screen Awards	Pierre-Yves Cardinal	Tom at the Farm (Tom à la ferme)	
2013; 2nd Canadian Screen Awards	Marc Labrèche	Whitewash	
2013; 2nd Canadian Screen Awards	Alexandre Landry	Gabrielle	
2014; 3rd Canadian Screen Awards
2014; 3rd Canadian Screen Awards	John Cusack	Maps to the Stars	
2014; 3rd Canadian Screen Awards	Justin Chatwin	Bang Bang Baby	
2014; 3rd Canadian Screen Awards	Kris Demeanor	The Valley Below	
2014; 3rd Canadian Screen Awards	Marc-André Grondin	You're Sleeping Nicole (Tu dors Nicole)	
2014; 3rd Canadian Screen Awards	Robert Pattinson	Maps to the Stars	
2015; 4th Canadian Screen Awards
2015; 4th Canadian Screen Awards	Nick Serino	Sleeping Giant	
2015; 4th Canadian Screen Awards	Waris Ahluwalia	Beeba Boys	
2015; 4th Canadian Screen Awards	Irdens Exantus	My Internship in Canada (Guibord s'en va-t'en-guerre)	
2015; 4th Canadian Screen Awards	Patrick Hivon	Ville-Marie	
2015; 4th Canadian Screen Awards	Tony Nardi	Corbo	
2016; 5th Canadian Screen Awards
2016; 5th Canadian Screen Awards	Vincent Cassel	It's Only the End of the World (Juste la fin du monde)	
2016; 5th Canadian Screen Awards	Henry Czerny	The Other Half	
2016; 5th Canadian Screen Awards	Evan Mercer	Riverhead	
2016; 5th Canadian Screen Awards	Jacques Newashish	Before the Streets (Avant les rues)	
2016; 5th Canadian Screen Awards	Michael Reventar	Kidnap Capital	
2017; 6th Canadian Screen Awards
2017; 6th Canadian Screen Awards	Ethan Hawke	Maudie	
2017; 6th Canadian Screen Awards	Sylvio Arriola	All You Can Eat Buddha	
2017; 6th Canadian Screen Awards	Jahmil French	Boost	
2017; 6th Canadian Screen Awards	Sladen Peltier	Indian Horse	
2017; 6th Canadian Screen Awards	Natar Ungalaaq	Iqaluit	
2018; 7th Canadian Screen Awards
2018; 7th Canadian Screen Awards	Richard Clarkin	The Drawer Boy	
2018; 7th Canadian Screen Awards	Paul Ahmarani	Genesis (Genèse)	
2018; 7th Canadian Screen Awards	Paul Doucet	With Love (L'Amour)	
2018; 7th Canadian Screen Awards	Michel Robin	Just a Breath Away (Dans la brume)	
2018; 7th Canadian Screen Awards	Jacob Whiteduck-Lavoie	A Colony (Une colonie)	
2019; 8th Canadian Screen Awards
2019; 8th Canadian Screen Awards	Rémy Girard	And the Birds Rained Down (Il pleuvait des oiseaux)	
2019; 8th Canadian Screen Awards	Douglas Grégoire	Kuessipan	
2019; 8th Canadian Screen Awards	Matt Johnson	Anne at 13,000 Ft.	
2019; 8th Canadian Screen Awards	Andy McQueen	Disappearance at Clifton Hill	
2019; 8th Canadian Screen Awards	Daniel Stern	James vs. His Future Self	

== 2020s ==
Year	Nominee	Film	Ref
2020; 9th Canadian Screen Awards
2020; 9th Canadian Screen Awards	Colm Feore	Sugar Daddy	
2020; 9th Canadian Screen Awards	Jesse LaVercombe	Violation	
2020; 9th Canadian Screen Awards	Stephen McHattie	Come to Daddy	
2020; 9th Canadian Screen Awards	Ronnie Rowe Jr.	Akilla's Escape	
2020; 9th Canadian Screen Awards	Thamela Mpumlwana	Akilla's Escape	
2021; 10th Canadian Screen Awards
2021; 10th Canadian Screen Awards	Joshua Odjick	Wildhood	
2021; 10th Canadian Screen Awards	Esteban Comilang	Islands	
2021; 10th Canadian Screen Awards	David La Haye	Confessions of a Hitman (Confessions)	
2021; 10th Canadian Screen Awards	Claude Legault	Drunken Birds (Les Oiseaux ivres)	
2021; 10th Canadian Screen Awards	Mark O'Brien	The Righteous	

== See also ==
- Prix Iris for Best Supporting Actor
