= David Meyer =

British actor

- Born: David Meyer; 24 July 1947 (age 78); Watford, Hertfordshire, England
- Occupation: Actor
- Years active: 1972–present
- Notable work: Octopussy

David Meyer (born 24 July 1947) is an English actor. He is the twin of Anthony Meyer who has often appeared alongside him in film. He is best known for his role as a knife-throwing circus performer and assassin in the 1983 James Bond film Octopussy, for Shakespearean roles such as Hamlet and Ferdinand, and for portraying Isaac Newton on stage. Meyer, as part of Shakespeare's Globe, has appeared in numerous productions on stage in London in recent decades, and in 2017 played Saturn in James Wallace's production of The Woman in the Moon at the Sam Wanamaker Playhouse.

== Early career ==
Between August 1972 and 24 November 1972 and 23 January 1973 and August 1973, David Meyer played a Fairy in the Royal Shakespeare Company production of A Midsummer Night's Dream, with his twin brother Anthony Meyer playing the role until 13 January 1973. The tour included performances at the Aldwych Theatre in London. In October 1974, Meyer starred in the Lindsay Kemp Broadway play Flowers at the Biltmore Theatre in New York City. In August 1975 he played Wilf in a Kevin Billington production of Bloody Neighbours at the ICA Theatre in London, a role which Charles Lewsen in The Times described as "hypnotically fascinating".

== Hamlet and other film roles, 1976–1989 ==
In 1976 Meyer and his twin appeared in the Celestrino Coronado film adaption of Shakespeare's Hamlet, portraying Hamlet and Laertes. The Shakespeare scholar and author Stephen M. Buhler states that director Coronado had "done a wildly experimental film essay on Hamlet in 1976, stressing the internal divisions and sexual conflicts within the title character and the language he employs: two actors, Anthony and David Meyer." In 1978, the twin brothers portrayed the grown up characters of twins Andrew and Étienne and sons of William Shatner's character in the Canadian film The Third Walker, a film about two families in Cape Breton Island whose infant sons are mistakenly switched at birth by the hospital. The film garnered three Canadian Film Award nominations at the 29th Canadian Film Awards. David Meyer also played the character of Henry Ingram in the Philip Mackie BBC television mini series An Englishman's Castle alongside actors such as Kenneth More and Nigel Havers. In 1979, Meyer had another lead role playing Ferdinand opposite Peter Bull as Alonso, King of Naples in the Derek Jarman film The Tempest.

In 1982, Meyer and his brother played the Poulencs in Peter Greenaway's The Draughtsman's Contract. Meyer played the assassin Mischka, a circus performer with a talent for knife throwing alongside his twin brother (Grischka) in the 1983 James Bond film Octopussy. He was credited as "Twin One". In 1985, Meyer appeared as Lysander in another Celestrino Coronado adaptation, in a television film production of Shakespeare's A Midsummer Night's Dream. He also portrayed the roles of Moth and Demetrius later in his career in the same play in Peter Brook stage productions. David and his brother turned down an opportunity to play Siamese twins in a performance at the Everyman Theatre in Liverpool in the mid-1980s.

In 1989, Meyer reunited with director Derek Jarman, playing a minor role as a businessman in his 1989 film War Requiem in a cast which included Laurence Olivier, Tilda Swinton and Sean Bean. He portrayed the doctor Frederick Treves alongside David Moylan as Joseph Merrick in Phillip Grout's directed play The Elephant Man at the Boulevard Theatre. Gerald van Werson, reviewing for The Stage, stated that Meyer "steals the show", playing the doctor with "fastidious zeal and self-doubt".

== Shakespeare's Globe and later work ==
In 1992, Meyer appeared as a doctor in the TV series Inspector Morse. In 1996, Meyer portrayed Alonso on stage in The Tempest.

In 1997, Meyer portrayed a Gestapo man opposite Clive Owen and Ian McKellen in Sean Mathias's British-Japanese drama film Bent, based on the 1979 play of the same name by Martin Sherman. The film is about the persecution of homosexuals in Nazi Germany after the murder of SA leader Ernst Röhm on the Night of the Long Knives.

Meyer later joined the Shakespeare's Globe. In 2008, he played the role of the nervous stage manager in Richard Jones's Pagliacci at the London Coliseum. In 2011 he portrayed Sir Isaac Newton, touring the US and appearing at the Royal Society. In his review of the play for Nature, writer Philip Ball stated that the Meyer was one of three actors, including a woman, to portray Isaac Newton at different points in his life.

In 2015 he played Danny's (Ben Whishaw)'s father in the series London Spy. In 2017, Meyer played Saturn in James Wallace's production of The Woman in the Moon at the Sam Wanamaker Playhouse. For his performance as Ed in Entertaining Mr Sloane, he was awarded the Los Angeles Drama-Logue Award for his performance.

== Filmography ==
- Hamlet (1976) – Hamlet / Laertes
- An Englishman's Castle (1978, TV Mini-Series) – Henry Ingram
- The Third Walker (1978) – Andrew Maclean
- The Tempest (1979) – Ferdinand, his son
- Lady Killers (1981) – Mr Armstrong
- Parsifal (1982) – 3rd Squire
- The Draughtsman's Contract (1982) – The Poulencs
- Octopussy (1983) – Mischka
- State of Wonder (1984) – Captain Benson
- A Midsummer Night's Dream (1985, TV Movie) – Lysander
- War Requiem (1989) – Businessman
- Snakes and Ladders (1989, TV Series) – Ronald
- Inspector Morse (1992, TV Series) – Dr. Hallett
- The Bill (1994, TV Series) – Terry Bird
- Bent (1997) – Gestapo man
- The Visual Bible: The Gospel of John (2003) – Lame Man
- London Spy (2015) – Danny's Father
- Institute (2020, TV Movie) – Karl's Father
- The Big Ugly (2020, TV Movie) – hillbilly leader
