= The Far Shore =

- Directed by: Joyce Wieland
- Written by: Bryan Barney; Joyce Wieland
- Produced by: Judy Steed; Joyce Wieland
- Starring: Frank Moore; Celine Lomez
- Cinematography: Richard Leiterman
- Edited by: George Appleby
- Music by: Douglas Pringle
- Production company: The Far Shore Inc.
- Distributed by: Astral Films
- Release date: 24 September 1976
- Running time: 105 minutes
- Country: Canada
- Language: English
- Budget: $435,000

The Far Shore is a Canadian drama film, directed by Joyce Wieland and released in 1976. Wieland's first commercial narrative feature film after years of making experimental short films, The Far Shore is a romantic drama which borrows elements from the life and death of painter Tom Thomson.

It premiered at the 1976 Cannes Film Festival, before having its Canadian premiere at the Canadian Film Institute's Ottawa 76 festival in August.

== Plot ==
Eulalie (Celine Lomez), a Québécois woman in a loveless marriage to wealthy industrialist Ross Turner (Lawrence Benedict), begins an affair with painter Tom McLeod (Frank Moore).

== Production ==
Wieland wrote the initial outline of the film in 1969, after viewing a retrospective show of Thomson and the Group of Seven. The film was originally titled True Patriot Love. After failing to receive a grant from the Canadian Film Development Corporation, she shelved the project for a time, although some of the drawings that she made to accompany the script outline were included in her gallery shows. She began writing the screenplay in earnest in 1972, hiring television writer Bryan Barney to assist. During this time, she also drew a large number of storyboards to illustrate her vision for the film. Shooting for the film occurred from 18 November to 6 December 1974, and from 7 June to 25 June 1975, on a budget of $435,000 (equivalent to $2,463,000 in 2025), with $200,000 coming from the CFDC.

Judy Steed came on as producer in 1973, with Wieland and Steed incorporating their own production company, The Far Shore Inc., in 1974. Over the next couple of years, they were able to secure partial funding from CFDC, Famous Players, Baton Broadcasting and the Toronto Star, but were not able to complete the film until influential Quebec film producer Pierre Lamy signed on as the film's executive producer in 1975, securing the remaining funding needed. Famous Players' financial commitment was initially made conditional on the film hiring a big-name star to play Tom McLeod, suggesting Rip Torn, Stacy Keach and Donald Sutherland, but they eventually withdrew the demand and allowed the film to proceed with Moore in the role. Filming was completed in 1975, with post-production completed in early 1976.

== Release ==
The film was shown at the National Arts Centre on 5 August 1976, and theatrically released on 24 September.

== Critical response ==
Gary Michael Dault of the Toronto Star called the film gorgeous, praising the cinematography of Richard Leiterman and the production design of Anne Pritchard, but said it was ruined by the acting. The reviewer for The Globe and Mail offered a similar assessment, calling the film beautiful but flat and stating that Moore gave the film's only strong acting performance.

The film is one of several from the era which have since been analyzed as an allegory for Canadian nationalism.

== Awards ==
The film won three Canadian Film Awards in 1976: Best Supporting Actor (Moore), Best Cinematography (Leiterman) and Best Art Direction (Pritchard).

== Works cited ==
- Turner, D. John, ed. (1987). Canadian Feature Film Index: 1913-1985. Canadian Film Institute. ISBN 0660533642.
- Melnyk, George (2004). One Hundred Years of Canadian Cinema. University of Toronto Press. ISBN 080203568X.
