= Marc Champion =

Canadian cinematographer (1927–2018)

Marc Champion (1927–2018) was a Canadian cinematographer. He is most noted as a two-time Canadian Film Award/Genie Award nominee for Best Cinematography, receiving nominations at the 29th Canadian Film Awards in 1978 for I, Maureen and at the 7th Genie Awards in 1986 for Samuel Lount, and as a Gemini Award winner for Best Photography in a Dramatic Program or Series at the 3rd Gemini Awards in 1988 for Anne of Green Gables: The Sequel.

His other credits included the films Bang Bang, Slipstream, Sunday in the Country, Partners, Breaking Point, Why Shoot the Teacher? and Angela.
