= The Hottest Show on Earth =

1977 Canadian documentary film

- Directed by: Terence Macartney-Filgate; Derek Lamb; Wolf Koenig
- Written by: Don Arioli; Ian Ball; Wolf Koenig; Derek Lamb; David Suzuki; William Weintraub
- Produced by: Wolf Koenig; Derek Lamb; Jeffrey Schon
- Narrated by: David Suzuki
- Cinematography: Terence Macartney-Filgate; Wolf Koenig
- Edited by: John Laing; Judith Potterton
- Music by: Bill Brooks; Bruce Mackay
- Production company: National Film Board of Canada
- Release date: 1977
- Running time: 27 minutes
- Country: Canada
- Language: English

The Hottest Show on Earth is a Canadian short documentary film released in 1977. Directed by Terence Macartney-Filgate, Derek Lamb and Wolf Koenig for the National Film Board of Canada, the film centred on the environmental and financial benefits of efficient building insulation, using both animation and humour to engage viewers on a potentially dry and boring topic.

The film won the Canadian Film Award for Best Short Documentary at the 29th Canadian Film Awards in 1978.
