= The Machine Age =

The Machine Age may refer to:

- The Machine Age (film), a 1977 Canadian short television film
- The Machine Age (EP), a 2003 EP by Chemlab

== See also ==
- Machine Age, an era that includes the early-to-mid 20th century
