= The Prophet from Pugwash =

1977 Canadian documentary film

- Written by: Robert Gardner
- Directed by: Carol Moore-Ede
- Narrated by: Colin Fox
- Country of origin: Canada
- Original language: English

Production
- Producer: Carol Moore-Ede
- Cinematography: Edmund Long
- Editor: David Donovan
- Running time: 60 minutes
- Production company: Canadian Broadcasting Corporation

Original release
- Network: CBC Television
- Release: November 9, 1977

The Prophet from Pugwash is a Canadian documentary film, directed by Carol Moore-Ede and released in 1977. The film is a portrait of Cyrus Eaton, the Canadian financier most noted for convening the annual Pugwash Conferences on Science and World Affairs.

The film was broadcast by CBC Television on November 9, 1977.

The film received a Canadian Film Award nomination for Best Feature Length Documentary at the 29th Canadian Film Awards in 1978.
