= Hog Wild (1980 film) =

- Theatrical release poster
- Directed by: Les Rose
- Screenplay by: Andrew Peter Marin
- Story by: Stephen J. Miller
- Produced by: Claude Héroux
- Starring: Patti D'Arbanville; Michael Biehn; Tony Rosato; Angelo Rizacos; Martin Doyle; Claude Philippe
- Cinematography: René Verzier
- Edited by: Dominique Boisvert
- Music by: Paul Zaza
- Production companies: Canadian Film Development Corporation; Filmplan International; Reindeer Productions
- Distributed by: New World-Mutual
- Release date: June 1, 1980
- Running time: 95 minutes
- Country: Canada
- Language: English

Hog Wild is a 1980 Canadian comedy film directed by Les Rose and written by Andrew Peter Marin. The film stars Patti D'Arbanville, Michael Biehn, Tony Rosato, Angelo Rizacos, Martin Doyle and Claude Philippe. The film was released on June 1, 1980, by Embassy Pictures.

== Plot ==
A Canadian defends his old campus against an outlaw biker and his motorcycle gang.

== Cast ==
- Patti D'Arbanville as Angie Barnes
- Michael Biehn as Tim Warner
- Tony Rosato as "Bull"
- Angelo Rizacos as "Bean"
- Martin Doyle as "Shadow"
- Claude Philippe as "Indian"
- Matt Craven as "Chrome"
- Jack Blum as Gil Lasky
- Keith Knight as Vern Jones
- Michael Zelniker as Pete Crenshaw
- Robin McCulloch as "Stiff" Curd
- Sean McCann as Colonel Warner
- John Rutter as Sheriff Earl Ramble
- Bronwen Mantel as Mrs. Ramble
- Karen Stephen as Brenda Dillard
- Stephanie Miller as Sarah Milliken
- Mitch Martin as Polly
- Jacoba Knaapen as Tina
- Thomas Kovacs as "Veel"
- Matt Birman as Lead
- Susan Harrop as Jenny
- Norman Taviss as Henry Curd
- Bena Singer as Mrs. Milliken
- Len Watt as Mr. Dillard
- Roland Nincheri as Mr. Crenshaw

== Reception ==
The film was a box office flop.
