= Sunday in the Country =

- U.S theatrical release poster
- Directed by: John Trent
- Written by: Robert Maxwell; John Trent
- Story by: David Main
- Produced by: David Perlmutter
- Starring: Ernest Borgnine; Michael J. Pollard; Hollis McLaren; Cec Linder; Louis Zorich
- Cinematography: Marc Champion
- Edited by: Tony Lower
- Music by: Paul Hoffert; William McCauley
- Production companies: Quadrant Films; Impact Films; Canadian Film Development Corporation
- Distributed by: American International Pictures; Cinerama Releasing Corporation; EMI Films
- Release date: November 22, 1974 (United States)
- Running time: 93 minutes
- Countries: Canada; United Kingdom
- Language: English

Sunday in the Country (also known as Blood for Blood) is a 1974 Canadian-British crime thriller film, directed by John Trent and starring Ernest Borgnine and Michael J. Pollard. It was written by Robert Maxwell and Trent.

== Plot ==
Farmer Adam Smith decides to enact vigilante justice when he discovers fugitive criminal Leroy and his accomplices Dinelli and Ackerman hiding out in his barn.

== Cast ==
- Ernest Borgnine as Adam Smith
- Michael J. Pollard as Leroy
- Hollis Mclaren as Lucy
- Louis Zorich as Dinelli
- Cec Linder as Ackerman
- Vladimír Valenta as Luke
- Al Waxman as Sergeant
- Tim Henry as Eddie
- Murray Westgate as Conway
- Ralph Endersby as Timmy Peterson
- Sue Petrie as Jennifer Logan
- Ratch Wallace as policeman
- Mark Walker as highway patrolman
- Gary Reineke as highway patrolman
- Eric Clavering as station master
- David Hughes as pastor
- Carl Banas as radio announcer

== Reception ==
The Monthly Film Bulletin wrote: "Savouring (while, of course, 'deploring') Borgnine's excesses, Sunday in the Country ultimately leans towards the asocial convictions of a hero cast in the role of Primal Man: not for nothing his archtypal name, and how else should we read the murder of the two policemen who have (democratically) rescued Leroy from the rigours of Adam's Law? What is left beyond the sweep of this jawbreakingly unattractive philosophy (fit even to give a Peckinpah pause) is, finally, the charisma of Borgnine himself (somewhat exaggerated in his gruff 'manliness', but eminently watchable), Hollis McLaren's ability to inject far more personal charm into an unrewarding part than one would expect, and – albeit overplayed – Michael J. Pollard's full-blooded rendering of a psychotic city-slicker, spitting and clawing all the way to the cemetery."

Variety wrote: "A feature very few serious-minded critics could like, it tells the story of a grandfatherly farmer who takes vengence into his own hands. ... Ernest Borgnine is the seemingly gentle farmer who turns the tables, and Michael Pollard is a zonked-out murderer, hated by his colleagues, and for the most part left in the film to drool in large spasms of uncontrolled overacting. Newcomer Hollis McLaren, as the farmer's granddaughter who is shut up when she wants to call for the police, looks the part, but is in need of acting lessons. Giving this feature a better-than-B look is handsome camerawork of Marc Champion and for the most part cool, crisp direction from John Trent. Much of the dialog is banal and takes the place of real insight into the characters."

In his 2003 book A Century of Canadian Cinema, Gerald Pratley identified the film as one of the key progenitors of the trend in 1970s Canadian cinema to cast higher-profile American stars in lead roles to improve the film's international marketability.
