= Chapelle Jaffe =

Canadian actress

Chapelle Jaffe is a Canadian film, television and stage actress. She is most noted for winning the Canadian Film Award for Best Actress in a Non-Feature at the 29th Canadian Film Awards in 1978 for the television film One Night Stand, and receiving a Genie Award nomination for Best Supporting Actress at the 3rd Genie Awards in 1982 for The Amateur.

Jaffe also was in the cast of the original production of One Night Stand at the Tarragon Theatre in Toronto.

In 1977, Jaffe's acting in Red Emma brought her a nomination for an ACTRA Award for the best acting performance in TV.

She was the editor of the first edition of the Academy of Canadian Cinema and Television's Who's Who in Canadian Film and Television directory.

Jaffe also worked in the administrative dimension of entertainment, including being executive director of Vancouver's New Play Festival and Playwrights Theatre Centre.

== Filmography ==
=== Film ===
Year	Title	Role	Notes
1975	Me	Kathy	
1977	Who Has Seen the Wind	Maggie O'Connal	
1980	The Kidnapping of the President	Valerie Martinelli	
1981	Silence of the North	The Red-Headed Lady	
1981	The Amateur	Gretchen	
1983	The Dead Zone	Nurse	
1985	Terminal Choice	Mrs. Dodson	
1986	Confidential	Amelia	
1989	Millennium	Council Member - Stockholm	
1990	Defy Gravity	Mary Fiddich	
2002	Fifty-Fifty	Margaret	Short
2004	The Butterfly Effect	Madame Helga	

=== Television ===
Year	Title	Role	Notes
1974	Performance	Emma Goldman	Episode "Red Emma"
1978	One Night Stand	Daisy	TV film
1981	The July Group	Janet	TV film
1983	American Playhouse	Djamilla	Episode: "Overdrawn at the Memory Bank"
1985, 1988	Night Heat	Arlene Elizabeth, Mrs. Metcalfe	Episodes: "Innocents", "Forgive Me Father"
1988	Diamonds		Episode: "Where There's a Will"
1988	Friday the 13th: The Series	Tanya Sloane	Episode: "Master of Disguise"
1988, 1990	Danger Bay	Noreen	Episodes: "The Only Way Down Is Up", "Looking Back"
1989	Where the Spirit Lives	Miss Appleby	TV film
1989–1992	E.N.G.	Dr. Forbes	Episodes: "Pilot: Parts 1 & 2", "Payment in Kind", "Harvest"
1991	Drop Dead Gorgeous	Mrs. Lewin	TV film
1991	Mark Twain and Me	Sarah Hardwig	TV film
1992	The Broken Cord	Judy Jensen	TV film
1993	Street Legal	Frances Doneff	Episode: "Forgiveness"
1994	Sin & Redemption	Emma Simms	TV film
1994	Madison	Lucy	Episode: "Playing Solitaire"
1995	Harrison Bergeron	Head House Lady	TV film
1996	A Kidnapping in the Family	Judge Harpe	TV film
1996	Sliders	Gladys	Episode: "El Sid"
1996	Reckoning	Madame Durand	TV film
1996	Poltergeist: The Legacy	Miss Clark	Episode: "Doppelganger"
1998	Cold Squad	Myra Fitch	Episode: "Jane Klosky"
1998–99	The X-Files	Dr. Patou	Episodes: "The Red and the Black", "Two Fathers"
2001	Andromeda	Constanza Stark	Episode: "Forced Perspective"
2004	This Is Wonderland		Episode: "1.6"
2004	The Grid	Catherine Cross	TV miniseries
2004	Sue Thomas: F.B.Eye	Clerk	Episode: "The Actor"
2007	The Dresden Files	Sister Beatrice	Episode: "Rules of Engagement"
2007	Instant Star	Charity Woman	Episode: "Heart of Gold"
2009	Flashpoint	Mrs. Hill	Episode: "Perfect Storm"
2010	Lost Girl	Martha	Episode: "ArachnoFaebia"
2010	Being Erica	Joyce Fitzpatrick	Episodes: "The Rabbit Hole", "Being Adam", "Adam's Family"
2014	The Christmas Parade	Wendy Thomas	TV film
