= Willie Lamothe =

Canadian musician and actor

Willie Lamothe was the stage name of Joachim Guillaume Lamothe CM (January 27, 1920 – October 19, 1992), a Canadian musician and actor from Quebec. One of the pioneers of French language country music, he recorded over 500 songs, both originals and translated renditions of English language country music hits, over the course of his career.

== Biography ==
Born and raised in Saint-Hyacinthe, Lamothe served in the Canadian Army during World War II, beginning his career in music by performing as "The Singing Sergeant" for his fellow soldiers. Following the end of the war, he recorded his first mini-album, Je suis un cowboy canadien, in 1946. He recorded a number of albums and singles over the next thirty years and frequently performed on tour, most frequently within Quebec but also from time to time in English Canada and at least one performance in Nashville. His performances included shows opening for Gene Autry at the Montreal Forum in 1952 and 1954.

Through the 1970s he performed as an actor in a number of films, most notably We Are Far from the Sun (On est loin du soleil), The True Nature of Bernadette (La Vraie nature de Bernadette), The Doves (Les Colombes) and The Death of a Lumberjack (La Mort d'un bûcheron), and won the Canadian Film Award for Best Supporting Actor in 1973 for the latter role. In 1978 he won the Best Supporting Performer in a Non-Feature film for his role in The Machine Age (L'Âge de la machine). During the same era, he was host of a television variety show, Le Ranch à Willie, for Télé-Métropole, and the subject of a documentary film, Je chante à cheval... avec Willie Lamothe, for the National Film Board.

He suffered a stroke while performing in Rimouski in 1978, and made only irregular appearances afterward, most notably in a CBC Television series about the history of Canadian country music in the 1990s. He was inducted as a Member of the Order of Canada in 1979.

His son Michel (1948-2019), also sometimes credited as "Willie Lamothe, Jr.", was a rock musician who was associated with the bands Offenbach and Corbeau.

Lamothe died on October 19, 1992, at age 72.

== In popular culture ==
- Charles Brunet made a celebrity comic about Willy Lamothe in 1953.
