= National Board of Review Awards 1978 =

Annual US film awards ceremony

50th National Board of Review Awards

December 19, 1978

The 50th National Board of Review Awards were announced on December 19, 1978.

== Top Ten Films ==
1. Days of Heaven
2. Coming Home
3. Interiors
4. Superman
5. Movie Movie
6. Midnight Express
7. An Unmarried Woman
8. Pretty Baby
9. Girlfriends
10. Comes a Horseman

== Top Foreign Films ==
1. Autumn Sonata
2. Dear Detective
3. Madame Rosa
4. A Slave of Love
5. Bread and Chocolate

== Winners ==
- Best Film:
  - Days of Heaven
- Best Foreign Film:
  - Autumn Sonata
- Best Actor:
  - Jon Voight - Coming Home
  - Laurence Olivier - The Boys from Brazil
- Best Actress:
  - Ingrid Bergman - Autumn Sonata
- Best Supporting Actor:
  - Richard Farnsworth - Comes a Horseman
- Best Supporting Actress:
  - Angela Lansbury - Death on the Nile
- Best Director:
  - Ingmar Bergman - Autumn Sonata
