= The Machine Age (film) =

1977 Canadian short drama film

- French: L'Âge de la machine
- Directed by: Gilles Carle
- Written by: Gilles Carle
- Produced by: Roman Kroitor; Jacques Bobet
- Starring: Gabriel Arcand; Sylvie Lachance; Willie Lamothe
- Cinematography: Pierre Letarte
- Edited by: Avdé Chiriaeff
- Production company: National Film Board of Canada
- Release date: 1977
- Running time: 28 minutes
- Country: Canada
- Language: French

The Machine Age (French: L'Âge de la machine) is a 1977 Canadian short drama television film directed by Gilles Carle. The film stars Gabriel Arcand as Hervé, a police officer who is sent to Senneterre to capture escaped prisoner Claude, only to discover that the prisoner, whom he had expected to be a man, is actually a young woman (Sylvie Lachance).

The film was nominated for several Canadian Film Awards at the 29th Canadian Film Awards in 1978. Carle won the Award for Best Direction, Dramatic Non-Feature as well as the Best Screenplay (Non-Feature). The film is shot entirely in color. Arcand and Lachance were also nominated for the Best Actor and Best Actress in a Non-Feature film respectively. Willie Lamothe won the Best Supporting Performer in a Non-Feature award for his role in this film. The film also won the award for the Best Art Direction in a Non-Feature film.

== Cast ==
- Gabriel Arcand as Hervé
- Sylvie Lachance as Claude
- Willie Lamothe as Octave
