= Lynne Cavanagh =

Canadian actress

Lynne Cavanagh is a former Canadian actress. She is most noted for her performance as Nicki in the film Three Card Monte, for which she was a Canadian Film Award nominee for Best Supporting Actress at the 29th Canadian Film Awards in 1978.

Originally from Toronto, Cavanagh worked as a mime and clown before being cast in Three Card Monte as her debut role. Her only other film role was a small part in the 1979 film Summer's Children.

She subsequently left acting and moved into arts administration, becoming executive director of Music Yukon in 2012.
