= Frank Moore (Canadian actor) =

Canadian actor (born 1946)

- Born: 1946 (age 79–80); Bay de Verde, Newfoundland and Labrador, Canada

Frank Moore (born 1946 in Bay de Verde, Newfoundland) is a Canadian film, television and stage actor. He won the Canadian Film Award for Best Supporting Actor in 1976 for the film The Far Shore, and was also a nominee for Best Actor in 1978 for The Third Walker.

== Career ==
Moore has appeared in the films The Long Kiss Goodnight, Murder at 1600, Giant Mine, The Sleep Room, Dirty Pictures, Owning Mahowny, Martha, Ruth and Edie, Jesus Henry Christ and From the Vine, and the television series Adderly, Katts and Dog, Night Heat, The Campbells, Street Legal, E.N.G., Due South, Earth: Final Conflict, The Reagans, At the Hotel, Killjoys and Murdoch Mysteries.

On stage, his noted roles have included productions of the musicals Hair, Les Misérables, Tommy, The Drowsy Chaperone and Urinetown, and the plays Creeps, Leaving Home, The Crackwalker and Russell Hill.

== Filmography ==
=== Film ===
| Year | Title | Role | Notes |
|---|---|---|---|
| 1971 | Winter Comes Early | Barney | |
| 1975 | Lions for Breakfast | Card Player #3 | |
| 1975 | W.W. and the Dixie Dancekings | June Ann's Boss | |
| 1976 | The Supreme Kid | Ruben | |
| 1976 | The Far Shore | Tom McLeod | |
| 1977 | Rabid | Hart Read | |
| 1978 | The Third Walker | James Maclean | |
| 1979 | Bye, See You Monday | Robert Lanctôt | |
| 1979 | Stone Cold Dead | Teddy Mann | |
| 1981 | Kings and Desperate Men | Pete Herrera | |
| 1984 | That's My Baby! | Mike | |
| 1984 | Thrillkill | Caspar | |
| 1987 | Last Man Standing | Tenny | |
| 1987 | City of Shadows | Lieutenant Johnson | |
| 1987 | Street Justice | Vince Carolla | |
| 1988 | Martha, Ruth and Edie | Charles Morton | |
| 1989 | Food of the Gods II | Jaques | |
| 1994 | Replikator | Investigating Officer | |
| 1995 | Open Season | Reporter #3 | |
| 1995 | Blood and Donuts | Pierce | |
| 1996 | The Long Kiss Goodnight | Surveillance Man | |
| 1997 | Murder at 1600 | Captain Ford Gibbs | |
| 1997 | The Assistant | Detective Minogue | |
| 1998 | The Sleep Room | Mr. Krantz | |
| 1998 | Seeds of Doubt | Lester Crowley | |
| 2000 | Ernest | Ernest's father | |
| 2003 | Owning Mahowny | Atlantic City CFO | |
| 2006 | Troubled Waters | Special Agent Turner | |
| 2008 | Nothing Really Matters | Dr. Stern | |
| 2008 | Toronto Stories | Stevenson | |
| 2010 | The Triumph of Dingus McGraw: Village Idiot | Mr. Tom Amerson | |
| 2011 | Jesus Henry Christ | Stan Herman | |
| 2012 | The Samaritan | Walker | |
| 2012 | The Devil in Me | Adoption Husband | |
| 2014 | Devil's Mile | Mr. Arkadi | |
| 2018 | Octavio Is Dead! | Jack | |
| 2018 | Trouble in the Garden | Rob | |
| 2019 | From the Vine | Gordon Welsh | |

=== Television ===
| Year | Title | Role | Notes |
|---|---|---|---|
| 1971, 1972 | Dr. Simon Locke | Doyle / Marty | 2 episodes |
| 1976 | Teleplay | Fred | Episode: "The Italian Machine" |
| 1978 | Drying Up the Streets | Sam | |
| 1985–1987 | Night Heat | Various roles | 4 episodes |
| 1986 | Philip Marlowe, Private Eye | Torchy | Episode: "Guns at Cyrano's" |
| 1986 | Hot Shots | Fred | Episode: "Absent Minded" |
| 1986–1989 | The Campbells | Jack Ames | 4 episodes |
| 1987 | Alfred Hitchcock Presents | James Stuyvesant | Episode: "When This Man Dies" |
| 1987, 1992 | Street Legal | Henry Attles / J.G. Ladeucier | 2 episodes |
| 1988 | Katts and Dog | Captain Moffat | Episode: "Hostages" |
| 1988 | Family Reunion | Harry | |
| 1990, 1993 | E.N.G. | Sid Burley / Fuller | 2 episodes |
| 1992 | Counterstrike | Lenny | Episode: "The Three Tramps" |
| 1993 | Gross Misconduct: The Life of Brian Spencer | Businessman | Television film |
| 1993, 1995 | Kung Fu: The Legend Continues | Peterson / Baake | 2 episodes |
| 1996 | Due South | Johnstone | Episode: "Some Like It Red" |
| 1996 | Poltergeist: The Legacy | Dr. Warren Sloan | Episode: "The Bones of St. Anthony" |
| 1996 | Undue Influence | Mail Carrier | Television film |
| 1996 | Shadow Zone: The Undead Express | Harv | Television film |
| 1996 | Jack Reed: Death and Vengeance | Billy | Television film |
| 1996 | Giant Mine | Roger Warren | Television film |
| 1997 | The Absolute Truth | Mike Tormel | Television film |
| 1997 | Major Crime | Peter Popaulo | Television film |
| 1998 | My Date with the President's Daughter | Dan Thornhill | Television film |
| 1998 | Flood: A River's Rampage | Malcolm Oswald | Television film |
| 1999 | Emily of New Moon | Alexander Boggs | 1 episode |
| 1999 | The Last Witness | Colonel Thomas Rawlins | Television film |
| 1999–2002 | Earth: Final Conflict | Hubble Urich | 22 episodes |
| 2000 | Dirty Pictures | Don Ruberg | Television film |
| 2000 | Nuremberg | Hans Frank | Episode #1.1 |
| 2001 | Twice in a Lifetime | Dr. David Storey | Episode: "The Choice" |
| 2001 | The Day Reagan Was Shot | Lt. Col. Taylor | Television film |
| 2002 | Street Time | William Sloan | Episode: "Random Act" |
| 2002 | Master Spy: The Robert Hanssen Story | Agent Bunky | Television film |
| 2002 | Mutant X | McAllister | Episode: "Body and Soul" |
| 2003 | The Reagans | Don Regan | Television film |
| 2004, 2006 | Puppets Who Kill | Dwayne / Mr. Scratch | 2 episodes |
| 2005 | Sue Thomas: F.B.Eye | Senator Fenton | Episode: "Fraternity" |
| 2005 | The Eleventh Hour | John Delaney | Episode: "In Another Life" |
| 2006 | At the Hotel | Frank Richards | 2 episodes |
| 2007, 2014 | Mayday | Hans-Juergen Merten | 2 episodes |
| 2008, 2016 | Murdoch Mysteries | Lance Henderson / Jeb Cutler | 2 episodes |
| 2010 | Pure Pwnage | Judge | 2 episodes |
| 2010 | When Love Is Not Enough: The Lois Wilson Story | Dr. Bob | Television film |
| 2011 | The Kennedys | Bill Dobson | Episode: "Bobby's War" |
| 2012 | Rookie Blue | Officer Gowling | Episode: "The First Day of the Rest of Your Life" |
| 2013 | Copper | Dr. Beaumont Purvis | Episode: "The Place I Called My Home" |
| 2014 | Forget and Forgive | George Shelton | Television film |
| 2014 | The Christmas Parade | Judge Joe Morris | Television film |
| 2015–2018 | Killjoys | Hillary Oonan | 7 episodes |
| 2016 | Orphan Black | Board Member #1 | Episode: "From Dancing Mice to Psychopaths" |
| 2018 | Zombie at 17 | Dr. Davrow | Television film |
| 2019 | Anne with an E | Cigar-Smoking Codger | 2 episodes |
| 2020 | Self Made | John D. Rockefeller | Episode: "A Credit to the Race" |
