= Samuel Lount (film) =

1985 film by Laurence Keane

- Directed by: Laurence Keane
- Written by: Laurence Keane; Phil Savath
- Produced by: Don Haig; Laurence Keane; Elvira Lount
- Starring: R. H. Thomson; Linda Griffiths; Cedric Smith
- Cinematography: Marc Champion
- Edited by: Richard Martin
- Music by: Kitarō
- Production company: Moonshine Productions
- Distributed by: Utopia Pictures
- Release date: September 12, 1985 (TIFF)
- Running time: 97 minutes
- Country: Canada
- Language: English

Samuel Lount is a Canadian drama film, released in 1985.

A historical drama set during the Upper Canada Rebellion of 1837, the film stars R. H. Thomson as Samuel Lount, an organizer of the rebellion who was ultimately convicted of treason and executed in 1838. The film's cast also includes Linda Griffiths as Lount's wife Elizabeth, David Fox as David Willson, Booth Savage as Edward Kennedy, Richard Donat as Samuel Jarvis, Andrew Gillies as Francis Bond Head, Cedric Smith as William Lyon Mackenzie, and Donald Davis as John Strachan.

The film was produced by Elvira Lount, a direct descendant of Samuel's brother, and directed by Laurence Keane. Davis' ancestors also participated in the Upper Canada Rebellion.

It premiered at the 1985 Toronto International Film Festival, and received a limited further theatrical release before being distributed primarily as a television film on CBC Television in 1986.

The film received five Genie Award nominations at the 7th Genie Awards in 1986, for Best Actor (Thomson), Best Cinematography (Marc Champion), Best Costume Design (Olga Dimitrov), Best Editing (Richard Martin) and Best Sound Editing (Michael O'Farrell). It did not win any of the awards.

Part of it took place in Sharon Temple.
