= I, Maureen =

1978 film

- Directed by: Janine Manatis
- Written by: Janine Manatis
- Produced by: Dan Howard; Duane Howard
- Starring: Colleen Collins; Michael Ironside; Robert MacKay
- Cinematography: Richard Leiterman; Marc Champion
- Edited by: Kirk Jones
- Music by: Hagood Hardy
- Release date: September 1978 (TIFF)
- Running time: 102 minutes
- Country: Canada
- Language: English

I, Maureen is a Canadian drama film, directed by Janine Manatis and released in 1978. Adapted from a short story by Elizabeth Spencer, the film centres on Maureen (Colleen Collins), a woman who leaves her unfulfilling marriage to strike out on her own. The cast also includes Michael Ironside and Robert MacKay.

The film was screened at the Cannes Film Festival's Marché du Film in May 1978. before having its public premiere at the 1978 Festival of Festivals.

The film garnered three Canadian Film Award nominations at the 29th Canadian Film Awards, for Best Supporting Actor (Ironside, Mackay) and Best Cinematography (Marc Champion).
