= The Death of a Lumberjack =

1973 film

- Film poster
- French: La Mort d'un bûcheron
- Directed by: Gilles Carle
- Written by: Gilles Carle; Arthur Lamothe
- Produced by: Pierre David; Pierre Lamy
- Starring: Carole Laure
- Cinematography: René Verzier
- Edited by: Gilles Carle
- Release date: 25 January 1973
- Running time: 115 minutes
- Country: Canada
- Language: French

The Death of a Lumberjack (French: La Mort d'un bûcheron) is a 1973 Canadian drama film directed and co-written by Gilles Carle. The film was entered into the 1973 Cannes Film Festival.

== Plot ==
A young woman (Carole Laure) from rural Quebec comes to Montreal to find out the whereabouts of her father. She takes a job as a topless cowgirl singer in a nightclub owned by Armand (Willie Lamothe). Through her father's mistress, Blanche (Denise Filiatrault), she discovers he was working in a lumberjack camp and travels with Armand and Blanche to find him; however, it turns out he has been murdered by the camp's owners.

== Reception ==
The Death of a Lumberjack is one of Carle's best-known films in Quebec, although it's virtually unknown in the rest of Canada. The film was seen by 188,372 people in France. It won Canadian Film Awards for Supporting Actor (Lamothe) and Musical Score.

== Cast ==
- Carole Laure - Marie Chapdeleine
- Willie Lamothe - Armand St. Amour
- Daniel Pilon - François Paradis
- Pauline Julien - Charlotte Juillet
- Marcel Sabourin - Ti-Noir L'Esperance
- J. Léo Gagnon
- Roger Lebel
- Ernest Guimond
- Jacques Gagnon
- Gil Laroche
- Jacques Bouchard
- Yvonne Diabo
- Eugene Lahache
- Marcel Fournier
- Denise Filiatrault - Blanche Bellefeuille

== Works cited ==
- Marshall, Bill (2001). Quebec National Cinema. McGill–Queen's University Press. ISBN 0-7735-2103-8.
