= Defy Gravity =

- Directed by: Michael Gibson
- Written by: Michael Gibson
- Produced by: Don Haig; Doug Dales; Michael Gibson; Loudon Owen
- Starring: R. H. Thomson; Chapelle Jaffe; Simon Reynolds; Tracey Moore
- Cinematography: Douglas Koch
- Edited by: Darryl Cornford
- Music by: Mark Gane
- Production company: Shifting Weight Productions
- Release date: September 15, 1990 (Toronto)
- Running time: 90 minutes
- Country: Canada
- Language: English

Defy Gravity is a Canadian drama film, directed by Michael Gibson and released in 1990.

The film stars R. H. Thomson as Bill Fiddich, an inventor with bipolar disorder who is physically abusive to his wife Mary (Chapelle Jaffe) and daughter Debbie (Karen Saunders); Simon Reynolds as Patrick, his teenage son who is spared the physical abuse but is struggling to understand how to stand up to his father to protect the rest of the family; and Tracey Moore as Miss McInnis, Patrick's high school history teacher who tries to provide the emotional guidance Patrick isn't getting at home. The film's cast also includes Louis Ferreira, London Juno, Damir Andrei and Earl Pastko.

The film's working title was Resistance.

The film premiered at the 1990 Festival of Festivals.

Moore received a Genie Award nomination for Best Supporting Actress at the 13th Genie Awards in 1992.
