= One Night Stand (1978 film) =

- Written by: Carol Bolt
- Directed by: Allan King
- Starring: Brent Carver; Chapelle Jaffe
- Music by: Brent Carver; Carole Pope; Kevan Staples
- Country of origin: Canada
- Original language: English

Production
- Cinematography: Kenneth W. Gregg
- Editor: Myrtle Virgo
- Running time: 92 minutes

Original release
- Release: March 8, 1978

One Night Stand is a Canadian thriller television film, directed by Allan King and released in 1978. An adaptation of Carol Bolt's theatrical play, the film stars Chapelle Jaffe as Daisy, a woman who goes out looking for a one-night stand after being dumped by her boyfriend on her birthday, and connects with Rafe (Brent Carver), a mentally unstable street musician.

The film's cast also includes Dinah Christie, Susan Hogan and Robert A. Silverman.

Writing for The Globe and Mail, Stephen Godfrey called the film essentially a Canadian version of Looking for Mr. Goodbar. The film also received limited theatrical distribution in the United States.

The film won four Canadian Film Awards at the 29th Canadian Film Awards in 1978, for Best TV Drama, Best Actor in a Non-Feature (Carver), Best Actress in a Non-Feature (Jaffe) and Best Musical Score in a Non-Feature.
