= Title Shot =

- Directed by: Les Rose
- Written by: John C. W. Saxton; Richard Gabourie
- Produced by: Rob Iveson
- Starring: Richard Gabourie; Tony Curtis
- Cinematography: Henri Fiks
- Edited by: Ronald Sanders
- Music by: Paul Zaza
- Production company: Regenthall Films
- Distributed by: Pan-Canadian Film Distributors
- Release date: September 9, 1979 (Toronto)
- Running time: 88 min.
- Country: Canada
- Language: English

Title Shot is a Canadian crime drama film, directed by Les Rose and released in 1979. It was Rose's second collaboration with writer and actor Richard Gabourie following 1978's Three Card Monte.

The cast also includes Susan Hogan, Allan Royal, Jack Duffy, Sean McCann, Taborah Johnson, Michael Wincott, Michael Hogan and Reiner Schwarz in supporting roles.

The film premiered at the 1979 Festival of Festivals.

== Plot ==
Blake, a police detective in Toronto, is investigating an attempt by crime boss Frank Renzetti to rig the outcome of boxing matches.

== Critical response ==
The film was more poorly received by critics than Three Card Monte.

Jay Scott of The Globe and Mail wrote that "by the time the climax has rolled around, there have been a number of good performances (Susan Hogan, Jack Duffy, Taborah Johnson, Sean McCann) and many demonstrations of first-rate composition, rhythm and editing. But there have also been continuity and emphasis miscalculations — a strike at Curtis' bakery is introduced and then dropped, and the movie rushes by Curtis' fate (he's flamboyantly sleazy enough to care about) in favour of letting Gabourie twinkle his way into a big-star farewell. It took years for Jack Nicholson to reach the audience-patting excess of Goin' South; Gabourie has turned into the actor's version of a used car salesman after two movies."

In his 2003 book A Century of Canadian Cinema, Gerald Pratley described the film as disappointing, boring and filled with unlikable characters.
