= The Champions (miniseries) =

1986 film by Donald Brittain

- Genre: Documentary
- Directed by: Donald Brittain
- Country of origin: Canada
- Original language: English
- No. of episodes: 3

Original release
- Network: CBC Television
- Release: 1978 – 1986

The Champions is a three-part Canadian documentary mini-series on the lives of Canadian political titans and adversaries Pierre Elliott Trudeau and René Lévesque.

Directed by Donald Brittain and co-produced by the National Film Board of Canada and the Canadian Broadcasting Corporation, the series follows Trudeau and Lévesque from their early years until their fall from power in the mid 1980s. The series itself took over a decade to complete. The first two-hour-long episodes Unlikely Warriors and Trappings of Power were released in 1978. The third installment, the 87-minute The Final Battle, was not completed until 1986, after both men had retired from politics.

== Episodes ==
Unlikely Warriors explores Lévesque’s and Trudeau’s early years, from their university days through to 1967, when Lévesque left the Liberal party and Trudeau became the federal minister of justice. The episode documents the men’s similarities as well as differences. Though both were from wealthy families and were schooled by Jesuits, Trudeau had a detached intellectual perspective in sharp contrast with Lévesque’s more emotional journalistic approach. At their first meeting at a CBC cafeteria in Montreal, after a series of Socratic questions, Lévesque told Trudeau, "If you’re a goddamned intellectual, I don’t want to talk to you," setting the tone for their relationship to come.

Trappings of Power begins in 1967, when Trudeau, now Justice Minister, is being courted to run for the leadership of the Liberal party, and climaxes with Lévesque and his separatist Parti Québécois winning 1976 Quebec provincial election.

The Final Battle over the years between 1977 and 1986, including Lévesque and Trudeau’s final showdown in the 1980 Quebec referendum and the patriation of the Constitution of Canada. Part Three also follows each man’s fall from political grace.

== Production ==
The first two episodes of the series had a budget of $175,433 (equivalent to $787,052 in 2025) and The Final Battle had a budget of $350,659 (equivalent to $877,717 in 2025).

== Release and honours ==
Originally broadcast on CBC Television, Parts one and two of The Champions were also released as a feature-length film in 1978, winning four Canadian Film Awards, including Best Feature Documentary and Best Non-Dramatic Script.

The Final Battle won Genie Awards for Best Feature Documentary and Best Direction in a Documentary.

In 2006, the series was designed as a Masterwork by the Audio-Visual Preservation Trust of Canada.

The series was unavailable for several years, due to the expiration of rights for stock footage used in the film. As of 2009, those issues have been resolved and the series has been added to the National Film Board's online Screening Room.

== Works cited ==
- Evans, Gary (1991). In the National Interest: A Chronicle of the National Film Board of Canada from 1949 to 1989. University of Toronto Press. ISBN 0802027849.
