= Harness the Wind =

- Directed by: Sidney Goldsmith
- Written by: Sidney Goldsmith
- Produced by: Derek Lamb
- Narrated by: Michael Kane
- Cinematography: Raymond Dumas
- Music by: Alain Clavier
- Animation by: Sidney Goldsmith
- Production company: National Film Board of Canada
- Release date: August 1978 (OIAF)
- Running time: 12 minutes
- Country: Canada

Harness the Wind is a Canadian animated short film, directed by Sidney Goldsmith and released in 1978. The film is an educational documentary depicting the history of wind power.

The film premiered at the Ottawa International Animation Festival in August 1978, where it won the award for Best Instructional Film.

It received a Canadian Film Award nomination for Best Animated Short at the 29th Canadian Film Awards.
