= Fields of Endless Day =

1978 Canadian documentary film

- Directed by: Terence Macartney-Filgate
- Written by: Frederick Ward; William Whitehead
- Produced by: Terence Macartney-Filgate; Beryl Fox
- Cinematography: Dennis Miller; Ron Watts
- Edited by: Don Haig
- Music by: Oscar Peterson
- Production company: National Film Board of Canada
- Release date: October 18, 1978
- Running time: 60 minutes
- Country: Canada
- Language: English

Fields of Endless Day is a 1978 Canadian docudrama film, directed by Terence Macartney-Filgate. The film dramatizes various vignettes from Black Canadian history, from the early settlement of New France in the 1600s through to the early 1930s.

Stories depicted in the film include those of Mathieu da Costa, the first known free black person in Canada; Marie-Joseph Angélique, a slave who was controversially convicted and executed for purportedly burning down her master's house in 1734; the abolition of slavery in Upper Canada by John Graves Simcoe in 1793; the settling of Salt Spring Island by Black Canadians in the 1850s; and the story of cowboy and rancher John Ware.

Produced by the National Film Board of Canada, the film was distributed as a CBC Television broadcast on October 18, 1978.

The film received a Canadian Film Award nomination for Best Feature Length Documentary at the 29th Canadian Film Awards in 1978.
