= Girlfriends (1978 film) =

Film by Claudia Weill

- Theatrical release poster
- Directed by: Claudia Weill
- Screenplay by: Vicki Polon
- Story by: Claudia Weill; Vicki Polon
- Produced by: Claudia Weill
- Starring: Melanie Mayron; Anita Skinner; Eli Wallach; Christopher Guest; Bob Balaban; Gina Rogak; Amy Wright; Viveca Lindfors; Mike Kellin
- Cinematography: Fred Murphy
- Edited by: Suzanne Pettit
- Music by: Michael Small
- Production company: Cyclops Films
- Distributed by: Warner Bros.
- Release date: August 11, 1978 (New York City)
- Running time: 88 minutes
- Country: United States
- Language: English
- Budget: $500,000

Girlfriends is a 1978 American comedy drama film produced and directed by Claudia Weill and written by Vicki Polon. The film stars Melanie Mayron as Susan Weinblatt, a Jewish photographer who experiences loneliness once her roommate Anne (Anita Skinner) moves out of their apartment in New York City. It was the first American independent film to be funded with grants, but private investors helped complete the film.

Although the film began shooting in November 1975, it took almost three years to complete because the initial budget of $80,000 ran out. After the film was picked up for distribution by Warner Bros., it was released on August 11, 1978.

The film had won the People's Choice Award at the 3rd Toronto International Film Festival and was named one of the top 10 films of 1978 by National Board of Review. In 2019, the film was selected for preservation in the United States National Film Registry by the Library of Congress as being "culturally, historically, or aesthetically significant".

== Plot ==
Photographer Susan Weinblatt supports herself by shooting baby pictures, weddings, and bar mitzvahs while she aims for an exhibit of her work in a gallery. She shares an apartment on Manhattan's Upper West Side with her best friend, Anne Munroe, an aspiring writer.

After selling three of her pictures to a magazine, Susan thinks she has left the world of portraits and wedding photography behind her. However, her life begins to fall apart when Anne moves out and marries her boyfriend, Martin, and she struggles to sell her photographs.

Susan develops a crush on Rabbi Gold, who works at the bar mitzvahs and weddings she photographs. The two kiss, but before they start an affair, she accidentally meets his wife and son, which puts a damper on their relationship. She also meets a free-spirited hitchhiker named Ceil and allows her to stay in her apartment for a while, before eventually asking her to leave after Ceil makes a sexual advance on Susan.

After scamming her way into a meeting with a gallery owner, Susan is recommended to another gallerist, and she is able to get her own show. She also gets a boyfriend, Eric, whom she met at a house party. She later fights with Anne as the latter is jealous of her independence while Susan resents Anne's marriage and child. Later, she fights with Eric over her insistence on maintaining her own apartment instead of moving in with him.

At her gallery show, all of Susan's friends and family come to support her except for Anne, who Martin tells her has gone to the countryside alone in order to work. Susan goes to the countryside, and Anne apologizes for not attending her show and reveals that she had an abortion that morning, not wanting more children. Susan reveals that the reason she's hesitant to move in with Eric is because she's afraid of being left again. The two drink tequila shots and play games, but are interrupted by Martin's arrival.

== Cast ==
- Melanie Mayron as Susan Weinblatt
- Anita Skinner as Anne Munroe
- Eli Wallach as Rabbi Aaron Gold
- Christopher Guest as Eric
- Bob Balaban as Martin
- Gina Rogak as Julie Golden
- Amy Wright as Ceil
- Viveca Lindfors as Beatrice
- Mike Kellin as Abe
- Adam Cohen as bar mitzvah boy
- Jean De Baer as Terry
- Nancy Mette as Denise
- Ken McMillan as cabbie
- Albert Rogers as hair dresser
- Jane Anderson as Omega receptionist
- Russell Horton as photo editor
- Regina David as Rabbi's receptionist
- Ted Lambert as Peter Gold, Rabbi's son
- Tanya Berezin as Eleanor Gold, Rabbi's wife
- Kathryn Walker as Carpel's receptionist
- Roderick Cook as Simon Carpel
- Kristoffer Tabori as Charlie
- Stacey Lomoe-Smith as Rebecca
- Norma Mayron as Mrs. Weinblatt

== Production ==
The film started as a 30-minute film funded by a grant from the American Film Institute, but upon completion, Weill realized that she wanted to explore what would happen next in the story. That short film eventually became the first seven minutes of the feature film. Original funding for the feature film came from National Endowment for the Arts and New York State Council on the Arts, totaling $80,000. Principal photography was effectively six and a half weeks, but those days were stretched over the span of a year because the production kept running out of money. When the grant money ran out, Weill had to seek private investors to help complete the film. Once the film was finished, she took the film to Hollywood studios, and she sold it to Warner Bros. for world distribution. They also signed a contract with Weill to direct two more features.

== Release ==
Girlfriends premiered at the International Film Festival Rotterdam, as well as screening at Cannes and other festivals. It opened in New York City on August 11, 1978. The film was re-released in select theaters in the United Kingdom on July 23, 2021, by Park Circus.

== Reception and legacy ==
Girlfriends received positive notices from critics. A review in Variety wrote, "This is a warm, emotional and at times wise picture about friendship, a film deserving of a wide audience. It's documentary filmmaker Claudia Weill's first feature, although there's no reason to apologetically pigeonhole this movie as a 'promising first feature.' It's the work of a technically skilled and assured director." Gene Siskel of the Chicago Tribune gave the film 3 stars out of 4 and called it "a nice little picture" that "plays out its drama in an episodic, European style – small vignettes leading forward in time." Charles Champlin of the Los Angeles Times described it as "a candid, intelligent, informed, affectionate, deeply affecting and wryly funny examination of the lives of young career women in Manhattan now." Gary Arnold of The Washington Post wrote that the film "suffers from such a threadbare screenplay and tentative personality that one can't help marveling at its shlumpy appeal." Geoff Brown of The Monthly Film Bulletin wrote, "The clarity of Weill's focus, along with the witty script and keen performances, keeps Girlfriends for the most part likeably spry and intelligent."

Stanley Kubrick brought up the film in 1980 when being interviewed by Vicente Molina Foix at Kubrick's house:

Foix: Are you interested in the new paths or trends within current Hollywood production being tried by people like Coppola, Schrader, Spielberg, Scorsese or DePalma?

Kubrick: "I think one of the most interesting Hollywood films, well not Hollywood – American films – that I've seen in a long time is Claudia Weill's Girlfriends. That film, I thought, was one of the very rare American films that I would compare with the serious, intelligent, sensitive writing and filmmaking that you find in the best directors in Europe. It wasn't a success, I don't know why; it should have been. Certainly I thought it was a wonderful film. It seemed to make no compromise to the inner truth of the story, you know, the theme and everything else...

The great problem is that the films cost so much now; in America it's almost impossible to make a good film – which means you have to spend a certain amount of time on it, and have good technicians and good actors – that aren't very, very expensive. This film that Claudia Weill did, I think she did on an amateur basis; she shot it for about a year, two or three days a week. Of course she had a great advantage, because she had all the time she needed to think about it, to see what she had done. I thought she made the film extremely well."

On the review aggregator website Rotten Tomatoes, the film holds an approval rating of 93% based on 58 reviews, with an average rating of 7.4/10. The website's critics consensus reads, "Intelligently written and beautifully acted, Girlfriends captures the rhythms of female friendship – and late '70s New York – with a deftly assured hand."

=== Accolades ===
| Award | Year | Category | Recipient | Result | Ref. |
|---|---|---|---|---|---|
| Locarno Film Festival | 1978 | Bronze Leopard | Melanie Mayron | Won | |
| National Board of Review Awards | 1978 | Top Ten Films | Girlfriends | 9th Place | |
| Toronto International Film Festival | 1978 | People's Choice Award | Claudia Weill | Won | |
| Utah-USFilm Festival | 1978 | Grand Jury Prize Dramatic | Claudia Weill | Won | |
| British Academy Film Awards | 1979 | Most Promising Newcomer to Leading Film Roles | Melanie Mayron | Nominated | |
| David di Donatello | 1979 | Special David | Claudia Weill | Won | |
| Golden Globe Awards | 1979 | New Star of the Year – Actress | Anita Skinner | Nominated | |

== Home media ==
Girlfriends was released on DVD in the United States (Region 1) on May 28, 2010, as part of the Warner Archive Collection.

In August 2020, it was announced that the film would be made available for the first time on Blu-ray via The Criterion Collection, which was released November 10, 2020. The set contains a new 4K restoration, as well as new special features, including cast and crew interviews, two short films: Joyce at 34 and Commuters, theatrical trailer, and essays by critic Molly Haskell and scholar Carol Gilligan.
