= Tyler (film) =

- Genre: Drama
- Written by: Roy MacGregor
- Directed by: Ralph L. Thomas
- Starring: R. H. Thomson; Murray Westgate
- Country of origin: Canada
- Original language: English

Production
- Editor: Ron Wisman
- Running time: 90 minutes

Original release
- Network: CBC Television
- Release: September 30, 1978

Tyler is a Canadian television film, directed by Ralph L. Thomas and broadcast by CBC Television in 1978. The film stars R. H. Thomson as Tyler Dorsett, a young man who aspires to take over ownership and operation of the family farm where he grew up, but becomes drawn into unethical or illegal activities, such as gambling and cockfighting, as he desperately tries to raise the money to buy the farm within the 30-day deadline before his father (Murray Westgate) sells out to a major agribusiness corporation.

The film's teleplay was written by journalist Roy MacGregor.

It had its television airing on September 30, 1978. In advance of its television premiere, the film had a theatrical screening at the Montreal World Film Festival, where it won the award for Best Canadian Film.

Thomson received a Canadian Film Award nomination for Best Actor in a Non-Feature at the 29th Canadian Film Awards. It received several nominations at the ACTRA Awards in 1979, for Best Television Program, Best Performance in a Television Film (Thomson), Best Supporting Performance in a Television Film (Westgate) and Best Dramatic Writing for Television (MacGregor); Westgate and MacGregor won the awards in their categories.
