= The First Season =

- Directed by: Ralph L. Thomas (disavowed)
- Written by: Victor Nicolle; Brian L. Ross
- Produced by: Robert Frederick
- Starring: Kate Trotter; R. H. Thomson
- Cinematography: Richard Leiterman
- Edited by: Frank Irvine
- Music by: Graeme Coleman
- Release date: September 3, 1989 (MWFF)
- Country: Canada
- Language: English

The First Season is a Canadian drama film, released in 1989. The film stars Kate Trotter as Alex Cauldwell, a woman in British Columbia who, following the death of her fisherman husband Frank (Dwight Koss), tries to support herself and her daughter Jodie (Christianne Hirt) with the help of Frank's former fishing colleague Eric Anderson (R. H. Thomson).

The film was directed by Ralph L. Thomas, but he successfully lobbied to have his name removed from the completed film after alleging that the producers interfered with his director's cut by restoring 10 minutes of material he had removed from the film and cutting five minutes of material he considered "crucial". Unlike in the United States, where a film in this situation would have been credited to Alan Smithee, the Canadian film industry had no provisions for a directorial pseudonym, so the film was simply released without a directorial credit.

The film premiered at the Montreal World Film Festival in September 1989, and went into general theatrical release in early 1990.

The film received two Genie Award nominations at the 11th Genie Awards in 1990, for Best Cinematography (Richard Leiterman) and Best Editing (Frank Irvine).

== Cast ==
- Kate Trotter as Alex Cauldwell
- Christianne Hirt as Jodie Cauldwell
- R.H. Thomson as Eric Anderson
- Tony Pantages as Eugene
- Dwight Koss as Frank Cauldwell
- Delia Brett as Roberta (credited as Delia Breit)
- Gil Bellows as Ronne
- Rick Munro as Jeff
- Rob Roy as Elliot Keegan
- Barbara Russell as Ruth Kelsey
- George Josef as Travis
- Stephen E. Miller as McKelve
- Joel Price as Minister
- Kevin McNulty as John
- James K. Stevens as Mike, The Bartender
- Jim Byrnes as Band Leader
- Andrew Markey as Boy At The Beach
- Barbara Russell as Ruth Kelsey
