= Healing (1978 film) =

1978 Canadian documentary film

- Directed by: Pierre Lasry
- Written by: Pierre Lasry
- Produced by: Michael McKennirey
- Cinematography: David De Volpi; Savas Kalogeras
- Edited by: Pierre Lasry
- Production company: National Film Board of Canada
- Release date: October 1978
- Running time: 60 minutes
- Country: Canada
- Language: English

Healing is a Canadian documentary film, directed by Pierre Lasry and released in 1978. The film is an exploration of the issue of whether faith healing is a legitimate endeavour or a hoax, centred in part on controversial American evangelist Kathryn Kuhlman. Figures interviewed in the film include Bernard Grad and Richard Casadorph as believers in faith healing, and William Nolen on the skeptical side.

Produced by the National Film Board of Canada, the film was screened theatrically in 1978, including at the Chicago International Film Festival and at a program of Canadian documentary films screened at the Canadian consulate in Boston, before being broadcast by CBC Televisionon May 6, 1979.

The film received a Canadian Film Award nomination for Best Feature Length Documentary at the 29th Canadian Film Awards in 1978.
