= The Third Walker =

- Directed by: Teri McLuhan
- Written by: Teri McLuhan; Robert Thom
- Produced by: Teri McLuhan; Brian Winston
- Starring: Colleen Dewhurst; William Shatner; Frank Moore; Monique Mercure; Anthony Meyer; Andrée Pelletier; David Meyer
- Cinematography: Robert Fiore
- Edited by: Ulla Ryghe
- Music by: Paul Hoffert
- Production companies: Melvin Simon Productions; Quadrant Films; Wychwood Productions
- Release date: 1978
- Running time: 84 minutes
- Country: Canada
- Language: English

The Third Walker is a 1978 Canadian drama film directed by Teri McLuhan. The film explores the effect on two families in Cape Breton Island of having had their infant sons mistakenly switched at birth by the hospital.

It was financed by Melvin Simon Productions.

== Plot ==
Kate Maclean (Colleen Dewhurst) and Munro Maclean (William Shatner) have two twin boys, Andrew (Andrew Rankin) and James (Darren DiFonzo). One day at school, Andrew has a new classmate named Étienne Blanchard (Simon Rankin), who looks virtually identical to Andrew and has the same birthday; after medical tests confirm that Étienne and James were switched at the hospital, however, Étienne's mother Marie (Monique Mercure) leaves town rather than complying with the court order to surrender custody of Étienne to the Macleans in exchange for James. This development fractures the Maclean family, as Kate's unrelenting obsession with regaining custody of Étienne destroys her relationships with both Munro and James.

Years later following Munro's death, the now adult Andrew (David Meyer) and Étienne (Anthony Meyer) reunite at his funeral for the first time since the incident; while Andrew has maintained a brotherly bond with James (Frank Moore) despite their mother's attitude, it too is now tested by Andrew's desire to build a closer relationship with his real twin.

== Awards ==
The film garnered three Canadian Film Award nominations at the 29th Canadian Film Awards: Best Actor (Moore), Best Supporting Actress (Mercure), and Best Musical Score (Paul Hoffert).
