= The Bronswik Affair =

- French: L'Affaire Bronswik
- Directed by: Robert Awad; André Leduc
- Written by: Robert Awad
- Produced by: René Jodoin
- Starring: Lorna Brown (voice); Richard Comar (voice)
- Narrated by: Ian De Voy
- Cinematography: Richard Moras; Jacques Avoine; Raymond Dumas; Simon Leblanc
- Edited by: Robert Awad
- Animation by: Robert Awad; André Leduc; Jean-Michel Labrosse
- Production company: National Film Board of Canada
- Release date: 1978
- Running time: 24 minutes
- Country: Canada
- Language: English
- Budget: $106,618

The Bronswik Affair (French: L'Affaire Bronswik) is a 1978 Canadian short film, directed by Robert Awad and André Leduc for the National Film Board of Canada.

== Summary ==
The animated mockumentary satirizes advertising and marketing through the story of Bronswik, a fictional television manufacturer that features special technology designed to neutralize viewers' resistance to advertising pitches. This leads to a frenzied addiction to consumerism, sparking a political and social crisis.

== Production ==
The film had a budget of $106,618 (equivalent to $478,324 in 2025).

== Awards ==
- 29th Canadian Film Awards, Toronto: Best Theatrical Short Film, 1978
- Chicago International Film Festival, Chicago: Silver Plaque, 1978
- Linz International Short Film Festival, Linz: Third Prize, Most Humoristic Film, 1978
- International Festival of Short and Documentary Films, Lille: COLIOP Award (Comité Lillois d'opinion publique), 1978
- Yorkton Film Festival, Yorkton: Golden Sheaf Award, Best Humour Film, 1979
- New York International Film & Television Festival, New York: Bronze Medal, 1980
- Golden Gate International Film Festival, San Francisco: Certificate for Remarkable Direction, Short film for commercial distribution, 1979
- Melbourne Film Festival, Melbourne: Diploma of Merit, 1979
- Columbus International Film & Animation Festival, Columbus, Ohio: Chris Statuette, Commerce and Industry, 1980

== See also ==
- Media manipulation
- Television studies
- Product placement

== Works cited ==
- Evans, Gary (1991). In the National Interest: A Chronicle of the National Film Board of Canada from 1949 to 1989. University of Toronto Press. ISBN 0802027849.
