= Les Rose =

Canadian film director

Les Rose was a Canadian film and television director. He was most noted for the film Three Card Monte, for which he received a Canadian Film Award nomination for Best Director at the 29th Canadian Film Awards in 1978.

Rose began his career making documentary films for the National Film Board of Canada. Three Card Monte was his first commercial film. He subsequently directed the films Title Shot, Hog Wild, Gas and Isaac Littlefeathers, the television films Maintain the Right, The Life and Times of Edwin Alonzo Boyd and Covert Action, and two episodes of Fraggle Rock.
