= Blood and Guts (film) =

1978 film

Blood and Guts is a Canadian sports drama film, directed by Paul Lynch and released in 1978.

It was financed by Melvin Simon Productions.

The film stars William Smith as Dan O'Neil, an aging but still popular professional wrestler with a small wrestling troupe known as Rudy Huxtable and the Puddin' Pop Pimps. They become mentors to rising star Jim Davenport (Brian Patrick Clarke). The film's cast also includes Henry Beckman and Micheline Lanctôt.

The film received 11 Canadian Film Award nominations at the 29th Canadian Film Awards, including Best Picture, Best Director (Lynch), Best Actress (Lanctôt) and Best Supporting Actor (Beckman). Beckman won the Best Supporting Actor award.
