= The Last Tasmanian =

- Directed by: Tom Haydon
- Written by: Tom Haydon, Rhys Jones
- Produced by: Tom Haydon
- Cinematography: Geoff Burton
- Edited by: Charles Rees
- Music by: William Davies
- Release date: 1978
- Running time: 105 minutes
- Countries: Australia; France
- Language: English

The Last Tasmanian is a 1978 Australian-French documentary film about the decline of Tasmania's Aboriginal people in the nineteenth century including through genocide by European colonists.

The film was highly controversial in Australia, in particular for criticism by contemporary Aboriginal Tasmanians that the film suggested Tasmanian Aboriginal culture had been eradicated.

The Last Tasmanian screened widely internationally to acclaim, including receiving a nomination for the Gold Hugo at the Chicago International Film Festival, and was sold to television in twenty-two countries.
