= Ralph L. Thomas =

Brazilian-Canadian film director (1939–2026)

- Born: September 8, 1939; São Luís, Maranhão, Brazil
- Died: January 4, 2026 (aged 86)
- Occupations: Film director, screenwriter
- Years active: 1977–1996
- Spouse: Vivienne Leebosh

Ralph L. Thomas (September 8, 1939 – January 4, 2026) was a Brazilian-born Canadian film director and screenwriter. He was born in São Luís, Maranhão to Canadian Baptist missionary parents and grew up there and in Canada. He attended the University of Toronto for two years and began to write for the entertainment pages of the Toronto Star in 1963.

Thomas directed his first film in 1977 for CBC Television, a made-for-TV movie called Tyler. He continued to make film for television for a few years before he got his big break directing the feature film Ticket to Heaven. The film won Best Motion Picture at the Genie Awards and Thomas was nominated for Best Director.

His follow-up film, The Terry Fox Story, also won the Genie Award for Best Motion Picture. Thomas continued to direct feature and television films until 1996, although he opted to have his name removed from his 1989 film The First Season following producer interference in the editing.

Thomas was married to Vivienne Leebosh, film producer. He was earlier married to Dorothy Thomas, a Toronto City Councillor. He died from complications of heart disease on January 4, 2026, at the age of 86.

== Selected filmography ==
- Tyler (TV movie, 1977)
- Every Person Is Guilty (TV movie, 1979)
- Cementhead (TV movie, 1979)
- Ambush at Iriquois Point (TV movie, 1979)
- A Paid Vacation (TV movie, 1980)
- Ticket to Heaven (1981)
- The Terry Fox Story (1983)
- The Crowd (TV movie, 1984)
- Apprentice to Murder (1988)
- The First Season (1989)
- Vendetta II: The New Mafia (TV movie, 1993)
- Young Ivanhoe (TV movie, 1995)
- A Young Connecticut Yankee in King Arthur's Court (1996)
