= Angela (1978 film) =

1977 film by Boris Sagal

- Directed by: Boris Sagal
- Written by: Charles E. Israel
- Starring: Sophia Loren; Steve Railsback; John Vernon; John Huston
- Cinematography: Marc Champion
- Edited by: Yves Langlois
- Music by: Henry Mancini
- Distributed by: Warner Bros.
- Release date: April 19, 1978; (Italy)
- Running time: 91 minutes
- Countries: Canada; United States; Italy
- Language: English

Angela is a 1978 Canadian drama film directed by Boris Sagal and starring Sophia Loren and Steve Railsback.

== Cast ==
- Sophia Loren as Angela Kincaid
- Steve Railsback as Jean Lebrecque
- John Huston as Hogan
- John Vernon as Ben Kincaid
- Michelle Rossignol as Coco
