= In Praise of Older Women (1978 film) =

1978 film

- Directed by: George Kaczender
- Written by: Paul Gottlieb; Barrie Wexler
- Based on: In Praise of Older Women by Stephen Vizinczey
- Produced by: Robert Lantos; Claude Héroux
- Starring: Tom Berenger; Karen Black; Susan Strasberg; Helen Shaver; Marilyn Lightstone; Alexandra Stewart
- Narrated by: Henry Ramer
- Cinematography: Miklós Lente
- Edited by: George Kaczender; Peter Wintonick
- Music by: Tibor Polgár
- Production companies: Astral Bellevue Pathé; RSL Films
- Distributed by: Astral Films
- Release date: September 22, 1978
- Running time: 109 minutes
- Country: Canada
- Language: English
- Budget: $1.5 million
- Box office: $1,150,000

In Praise of Older Women is a Canadian film directed by George Kaczender. It is based on Stephen Vizinczey's book In Praise of Older Women.

== Plot ==
András Vayda grows up in a turbulent, war-torn Hungary, where he procures local girls for the occupying G.I.s during World War II. Disappointed by the girls his age, he meets Maya, a married woman in her 30s, who tutors him in love and romance. Maya is only the first of many mature women whom András will meet through his teenage and young adult life.

== Cast ==
- Tom Berenger as András Vayda
- Karen Black as Maya
- Susan Strasberg as Bobbie
- Helen Shaver as Ann MacDonald
- Marilyn Lightstone as Klari
- Alexandra Stewart as Paula
- Marianne McIsaac as Julika
- Alberta Watson as Mitzi
- Ian Tracey as Andras Vajda Jr.
- Monique Lepage as The Countess
- Louise Marleau as Woman In Elevator
- Henry Ramer as The Narrator (voice)

== Production ==
The film was shot from 12 September to 18 October 1977. The film was initially budgeted at $890,000, but cost $1.5 million, with $300,000 coming from the Canadian Film Development Corporation.

== Release ==
The film was distributed by Astral Films in Canada and Embassy Pictures in the United States. It was shown at the 1978 Toronto International Film Festival on 14 September, and released in Montreal on 22 September. The French dub was released in Montreal on 14 March 1980. The film earned over $20 million.

In Praise of Older Women was removed by Famous Players from a theatre, after having made $24,000 the previous week, in order to show The Boys from Brazil instead.

In 2023, Telefilm Canada announced that the film was one of 23 titles that will be digitally restored under its new Canadian Cinema Reignited program to preserve classic Canadian films.

== Reception ==
Before its release, the Ontario Film Review Board demanded the removal of a 35 second sex scene from the film. However, the original cut of the film was shown during the Toronto International Film Festival, and despite a subway strike and a rainstorm, hundreds of people waited outside the Elgin Theatre to see the film. According to some sources, counterfeit tickets were distributed, and a riot almost formed as ticket holders were turned away. The film received mostly negative reviews.

== Accolades ==
List of awards and nominations
Award	Category	Recipients and nominees	Result
Canadian Film Awards, 1978	Art Direction (Feature)	Wolf Kroeger	Won
Canadian Film Awards, 1978	Performance by a Lead Actress (Feature)	Helen Shaver	Won
Canadian Film Awards, 1978	Supporting Actress (Feature)	Marilyn Lightstone	Won
Canadian Film Awards, 1978	Cinematography (Feature)	Miklós Lente	Won

== See also ==
- In Praise of Older Women (1997 adaption)

== Works cited ==
- Pendakur, Manjunath (1990). Canadian Dreams & American Control: The Political Economy of the Canadian Film Industry. Garamond Press. ISBN 0920059937.

== Works cited ==
- Turner, D. John, ed. (1987). Canadian Feature Film Index: 1913-1985. Canadian Film Institute. ISBN 0660533642.
- Knelman, Martin (1987). Home Movies: Tales from the Canadian Film World. Key Porter Books. ISBN 1550130498.
