= René Jodoin =

Canadian animation director and producer

René Jodoin (30 December 1920 – 22 January 2015) was an animation director and producer who founded the French-language animation studio of the National Film Board of Canada. Born in Hull, Quebec on December 30, 1920, Jodoin died in Montreal on January 22, 2015, at the age of 94.

== Joining the NFB ==
Jodoin was invited by animation pioneer Norman McLaren to join the NFB in 1943. He worked in the NFB's original animation unit, then left the NFB in 1947. He returned to the Film Board in 1954, working in a variety of capacities, including as head of an NFB animation program producing films for the Department of National Defence and as head of NFB's Science Film Program.

== French animation studio founder ==
In 1966, he founded the French Animation Studio. He produced two Academy Award-nominated animated shorts during his tenure: Hunger, by Peter Foldes and Monsieur Pointu, by André Leduc and Bernard Longpré, as well as Balablok by Břetislav Pojar, winner of the Grand Prix du Festival for Short Film at the Cannes Film Festival, and The Bronswik Affair by Leduc and Robert Awad.

== Directorial credits ==
Jodoin's directorial credits include two short films with McLaren: Alouette and Spheres, an abstract film set to the music of Bach as performed by Glenn Gould. He was also sole director on a cycle of geometrical animated shorts: Dance Squared, Notes on a Triangle, Rectangle & Rectangles and A Matter of Form.

== Post-NFB ==
Jodoin resigned as head of the French Animation Studio in 1977 and left the NFB in 1985. In 2001, he was awarded the Prix Albert-Tessier, given to individuals for an outstanding career in Québec cinema.
