= Terence Macartney-Filgate =

British-Canadian film director (1924–2022)

Terence Macartney-Filgate OC
- Born: 6 August 1924; England
- Died: 11 July 2022 (aged 97); Toronto, Ontario, Canada
- Occupations: Film director; Cinematographer; Film producer
- Years active: 1954–2007

Terence Macartney-Filgate (6 August 1924 – 11 July 2022) was a British-Canadian film director who directed, wrote, produced or shot more than 100 films in a career spanning more than 50 years.

== Early life ==
Born in England, Macartney-Filgate lived in India until the age of nine. His family then returned to England and he became an admirer of documentaries after seeing the 1936 film Night Mail.

Macartney-Filgate was 15 years old at the outbreak of World War II and ultimately joined the Royal Air Force as a flight engineer, flying more than a dozen operations in Europe. In 1946 he attended Oxford University and obtained a degree in politics, philosophy and economics, and had a succession of jobs before immigrating to Canada.

== National Film Board ==
Macartney-Filgate had long admired the work of the National Film Board of Canada (NFB) and applied repeatedly for a job there before being hired as a scriptwriting assistant in 1954. He wrote commentary for sponsored films at the NFB from 1954 to 1957. He directed his first film in 1956.

Macartney-Filgate worked in the NFB's Unit B, with such filmmakers as Wolf Koenig, Roman Kroitor, Stanley Jackson, Michel Brault and Pierre Perrault, all of whom were at the forefront of the new unscripted, observational documentaries. He worked extensively as a director and cinematographer on the Candid Eye series. The NFB sold the series of 14 30-minute shorts to the Canadian Broadcasting Corporation (CBC), and Candid Eye (1958–61) was broadcast on that network. Executive producer Tom Daly oversaw the filmmakers, and the shorts were shot on location using new lightweight equipment with an emphasis on recording everyday life. Macartney-Filgate was personally responsible for seven of the films and he helped shape the series' unscripted and observational approach.

== Robert Drew Associates ==
In 1960, Macartney-Filgate left the NFB and Canada to work freelance for the U.S-based Robert Drew Associates, Robert Drew's company of documentarians that included Richard Leacock, D. A. Pennebaker and Albert Maysles. This group produced three films for Time Life that year: Yanqui, No!, Eddie (On the Pole) and Primary.

He was the principal (though uncredited) cameraperson on Primary, a documentary about the 1960 United States presidential Democratic primary race in Wisconsin between senators John F. Kennedy and Hubert Humphrey. Macartney-Filgate left Robert Drew Associates and worked freelance throughout most of the 1960s in New York City.

== Later career ==
In New York City, he worked with William Greaves, with whom he had previously collaborated on the Candid Eye series, and made films for television about such writers as Harold Pinter, Marshall McLuhan and Henry David Thoreau. In 1962, he was hired by American producer Robert Hughes to direct a documentary about the poet Robert Frost when the original director, Shirley Clarke, left the project. The film, Robert Frost: A Lover's Quarrel with the World (1963), won the Academy Award for Best Documentary Feature Film with Clarke credited as the sole director, despite Macartney-Filgate directing the majority of it. He returned to Canada and the NFB briefly to work on the 1963 series Lewis Mumford on the City, co-directing four of the six films. He won a Peabody Award (the Institutional Award for Television Education) for his 1964 documentary Changing World: South African Essay and, working again with Robert Hughes, conducted a rare interview with Vladimir Nabokov. In the late 1960s he worked for the NFB again on the Challenge for Change series, before moving to the CBC.

In the 1970s, Macartney-Filgate taught at the York University Department of Film in Toronto. While still a student, Jennifer Hodge de Silva worked with Macartney-Filgate as assistant director and associate producer on Fields of Endless Day (1978), "one of the first substantive films about Black history in Canada." In 1979 she was associate producer for Dieppe 1942 (1979), which was written by Timothy Findley and William Whitehead and was nominated for seven Genie Awards. Both of these films were made at the CBC, for which he had also directed Lucy Maud Montgomery: The Road to Green Gables (1975) and Grenfell of Labrador: The Great Adventure (1977). Timothy Findley: Anatomy of a Writer (1992) won the Donald Brittain Award at the 7th Gemini Awards in 1993. Macartney-Filgate also won two Canadian Film Awards for Blood and Fire (1958) and The Hottest Show on Earth (1977) and received an Ontario Film Institute Award in 1981.

== Retirement ==
In retirement, after 1990, he continued to work with Adrienne Clarkson on her arts show for CBC Television, Adrienne Clarkson Presents. In 1995, he worked with the NFB once again, directing Canada Remembers, a 3-part series about Canada in World War II. In 2007, he completed Raising Valhalla, a television documentary about the opening of a new opera stage at the Four Seasons Centre. As an advocate of small-format video, he worked freelance, based in Toronto.

== Honors ==
In May 2011, Macartney-Filgate was given Hot Docs' outstanding achievement award, which included a retrospective of his work.

Also in 2011, Macartney-Filgate was made an Officer of the Order of Canada.

== Personal life ==
Macartney-Filgate died in Toronto on 11 July 2022 at the age of 97.
