= Buying Time =

- Theatrical release poster
- Directed by: Mitchell Gabourie
- Screenplay by: Mitchell Gabourie; Richard Gabourie; Gordon McDonald; Dean Gabourie
- Produced by: Richard Gabourie
- Starring: Jeff Schultz; Laura Cruickshank; Page Fletcher; Leslie Toth; Dean Stockwell
- Cinematography: Manfred Guthe
- Edited by: Michael Todd
- Music by: David Krystal
- Production company: Louis George
- Distributed by: MGM/UA Communications Co. (through United Artists)
- Release dates: December 2, 1988 (Canada); May 12, 1989 (United States)
- Running time: 103 minutes
- Country: Canada
- Language: English

Buying Time is a 1988 Canadian action film directed by Mitchell Gabourie and written by Mitchell Gabourie, Richard Gabourie, Gordon McDonald and Dean Gabourie. The film stars Jeff Schultz, Laura Cruickshank, Page Fletcher, Leslie Toth and Dean Stockwell. The film was released on May 12, 1989, by United Artists.

== Plot ==
A low-budget crime drama set in Toronto concerning a couple of likable petty thieves, Jabber and Reno (Jeff Schultz and Leslie Toth), who are forced by the police (Dean Stockwell) to go undercover to discover who is killing the city's drug dealers.

== Cast ==
- Jeff Schultz as Jabber
- Laura Cruickshank as Jessica
- Page Fletcher as Curtis
- Leslie Toth as Reno
- Dean Stockwell as Detective Novak
- Wayne Robson as Rolley
- Michael Rudder as Cody
- Susan Potvin as Stella
- Martin Louis as Dez
- Sonny Forbes as Rosie
- Tony De Santis as Detective Delori
- Michèle Duquet as Charlotte
- Eric Keenleyside as Bartender
- Thick Wilson as Supervisor
- Louis Di Bianco as Scratch
- Ann McMillan as Jabber's Mother
- Sean Clattenburg as Young Boy
- Gerry Pearson as Jimmy
- Jessica Booker as Aunt Babs
- Christie MacFadyen as Angela
- Michael A. Miranda as Drug Buyer
- John Rutter as Mover
- Guy Sanvido as Storekeeper
- Fred Booker as Mr. Wilkinson
- Rob Wilton as Young Cop
- Kevin Comrie as Young Boy #1
- Hugh Magness as Young Boy #2
- Lanes Overholt as Scratch's Girlfriend
- Susan Brockie as Woman
- Douglas Millwood as The Priest
- Jim Paulson as Voice of Fight Commentator
