= Afterlife (1978 film) =

1978 short film directed by Ishu Patel

- Directed by: Ishu Patel
- Produced by: Derek Lamb
- Music by: Herbie Mann
- Production company: National Film Board of Canada
- Release date: 1978
- Running time: 7 minutes
- Country: Canada

Afterlife is a 1978 animated short by Ishu Patel. Parts of the animation were reused for the NFB-NHK documentary The Tibetan Book of the Dead: A Way of Life (1994).

== Summary ==
A film without words and an impressionistic look at life after death, based on recent studies, case histories and myths. In the film, the afterlife state is portrayed as a working-out of all the individual's past experiences.

== Accolades ==
Afterlife was produced by Derek Lamb for the National Film Board of Canada. Afterlife received numerous awards including a Golden Sheaf Award, a Canadian Film Award for Best Animated Film and the award for Best short Film from the Montreal World Film Festival. Music is by Herbie Mann, performing the David Mills composition, "In Tangier", from his album Stone Flute.
