= Richard Gabourie =

Canadian actor, screenwriter and film producer

- Born: April 30, 1939; Moose Jaw, Saskatchewan, Canada
- Died: October 11, 2004 (aged 65); Toronto, Ontario, Canada
- Occupation(s): Actor, screenwriter, film producer
- Known for: Three Card Monte

Richard Gabourie (April 30, 1939 – October 11, 2004) was a Canadian actor, screenwriter and film producer, most noted for winning the Canadian Film Award for Best Actor in 1978 for Three Card Monte.

Born in Moose Jaw, Saskatchewan, Gabourie worked as a stockbroker as a young man before studying acting at Toronto's Academy of Theatre Arts. Initially cast in bit parts and commercials, he eventually decided that with the Canadian film industry still relatively limited in its output, his best chance at getting a bigger and better part was to create one for himself, and worked for three years to write and make Three Card Monte. At the Canadian Film Awards, he won the award for Best Actor and the Wendy Michener Award.

Following his award win, he wrote and starred in his second film, Title Shot, in 1979. Title Shot was more poorly received than his debut, however, and after a final supporting appearance in the 1980 film Final Assignment he concentrated thereafter on production. His credits as a producer included the television film Showbiz Goes to War, the television series The Achievers and the 1989 film Buying Time, the directorial debut of his son Mitchell.

Gabourie died on October 11, 2004, of cancer.
