= Three Card Monte (film) =

- Directed by: Les Rose
- Written by: Richard Gabourie
- Produced by: Rob Iveson; Richard Gabourie
- Starring: Richard Gabourie; Chris Langevin; Lynne Cavanagh
- Cinematography: Henri Fiks
- Edited by: Ron Wisman
- Music by: Paul Zaza
- Production company: Regenthall Films
- Distributed by: Ambassador Film Distributors
- Release date: 1978
- Running time: 93 min.
- Country: Canada
- Language: English
- Budget: $250,000

Three Card Monte is a 1978 Canadian crime drama film directed by Les Rose and starring Richard Gabourie as Busher, a small-time con man who meets and becomes a father figure to a runaway kid named Toby (Chris Langevin).

The film was written by Gabourie. It premiered at the 1978 Festival of Festivals.

At the 29th Canadian Film Awards in 1978, the film garnered 11 nominations, including Best Feature Film, Best Director (Rose), Best Actor (Gabourie) and Best Supporting Actress (Lynne Cavanagh). Gabourie won the award for Best Actor, as well as the Wendy Michener Award in honour of his all-around achievement as a virtual unknown who successfully wrote, coproduced and starred in his own debut film.

The film was dismissed by The Globe and Mail film critic Jay Scott as being "in the respected tradition of naturalistic, manic-depressive Canadian cinema", and as "less valuable for what it is than for what it indicates that the people involved with it might be able to do under other, more agreeable circumstances." Other critics were more charitable, with both Bruce Kirkland of the Toronto Star and Ian Haysom of the Ottawa Journal calling it a good but not perfect film.

Rose and Gabourie subsequently collaborated on the 1979 film Title Shot, which was more poorly received than Three Card Monte.
