= Carol Bolt =

Canadian playwright (1941–2000)

- Born: August 25, 1941; Winnipeg, Manitoba
- Died: November 28, 2000 (aged 59); Toronto, Ontario
- Occupation: playwright
- Writing career
- Period: 1970s–1990s
- Notable works: One Night Stand, Buffalo Jump

Carol Bolt (August 25, 1941 – November 28, 2000) was a Canadian playwright. She was a founding member and, for several years, president of the Playwrights Union of Canada.

== Career ==
Bolt's play Buffalo Jump, an examination of Canada during the depression era of the 1930s, was performed at Theatre Passe Muraille in 1972.

Bolt's best known play, the thriller One Night Stand, was first performed in 1977, and was turned into a made-for-television film by Allan King in 1978; the film won several awards, and received mixed reviews. Her play Red Emma, told the story of radical anarchist Emma Goldman. Her last play was Famous, produced on stage in 1997, based on the real-life story of criminals Paul Bernardo and Karla Holmolka.

For television, Bolt's writing credits include one of the seven hour long productions of Jack London's Tales of the Klondike (In A Far Country: starring Scott Hylands and Robert Carradine); two episodes of the animated children's series The Raccoons, and a single episode of Fraggle Rock.

Bolt died of complications due to liver cancer on November 28, 2000, in Toronto, Ontario. Following her death, the Canadian Authors Association renamed its CAA Award for Drama to the Carol Bolt Award in her memory; the award is now administered by the Playwrights Guild of Canada.

== Works ==
Plays

- Buffalo Jump (1972)
- My Best Friend Is Twelve Feet High (1972)
- Cyclone Jack (1972)
- Gabe (1973)
- Pauline (1973)
- Red Emma, Queen of the Anarchists (1974)
- Shelter (1975)
- Maurice (1975)
- Finding Bumble (1975)
- One Night Stand (1977)
- Desperados (1977)
- Escape Entertainment (1981)
- Love or Money (1981)
- Famous (1997)

Books

- Drama in the Classroom (1986)

== Archives ==
There is a Carol Bolt fond at Library and Archives Canada. The archival reference number is R4602, former archival reference number MG31-D89. The fond covers the date range 1961 to 2000. It consists of 12.82 meters of textual records, 100 photographs and other media.
