= R. H. Thomson =

Canadian actor (born 1947)

R. H. Thomson CM
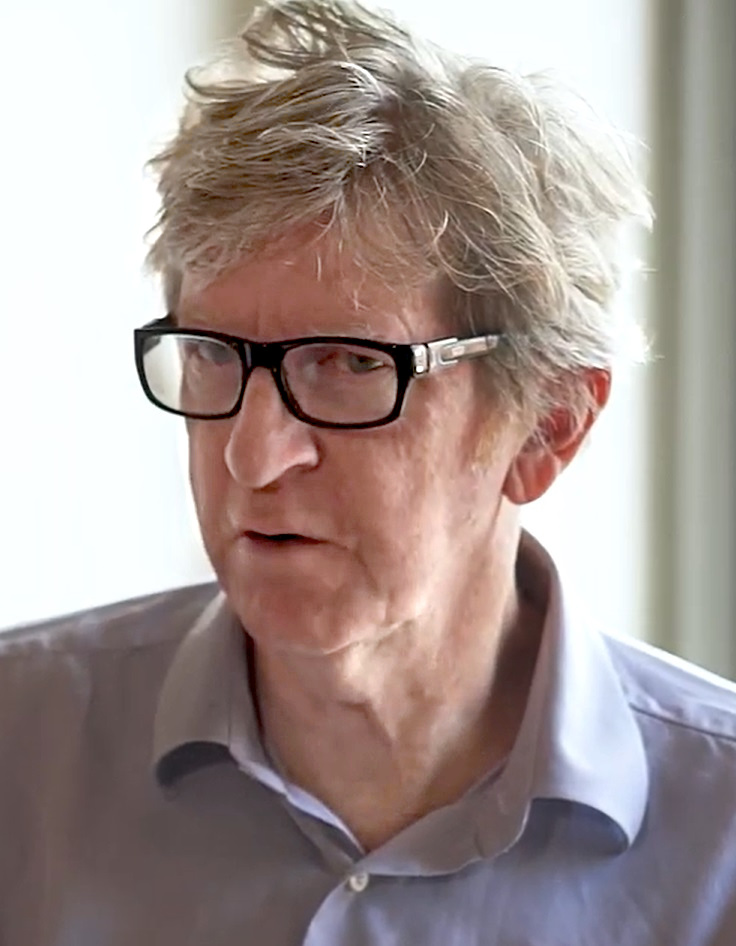
- Thomson in 2024
- Born: Robert Holmes Thomson; September 24, 1947 (age 79); Richmond Hill, Ontario, Canada
- Education: University of Toronto; National Theatre School of Canada
- Occupation: Actor
- Years active: 1976–present
- Spouse: Laurie Matheson
- Children: 2

Robert Holmes Thomson CM (born 1947), known as R. H. Thomson, is a Canadian television, film, and stage actor. With a career spanning five decades he remains a regular presence on Canadian movie screens and television. He has received numerous awards for his contributions to the arts, and to war veterans.

== Life and career ==
Thomson was born on September 24, 1947, in Richmond Hill, Ontario. He studied at the University of Toronto and the National Theatre School.

His own play The Lost Boys was staged at the Great Canadian Theatre Company in March 2000 and at Canadian Stage in February 2002. He has also hosted programming for CBC Radio and CBC Television. Thomson has portrayed a number of historical figures including Samuel Lount, Edsel Ford, Frederick Banting, Duncan Campbell Scott, Mitchell Sharp, and James Cross.

In 2010, he was appointed a Member of the Order of Canada. In May 2015 Thomson received a Governor General's Performing Arts Award for Lifetime Artistic Achievement. Eric Peterson performed in his honour at the gala celebrating the laureates at the National Arts Centre. In 2017 to 2019, Thomson co-starred in the Netflix series Anne with an E as Matthew Cuthbert.

== Personal life ==
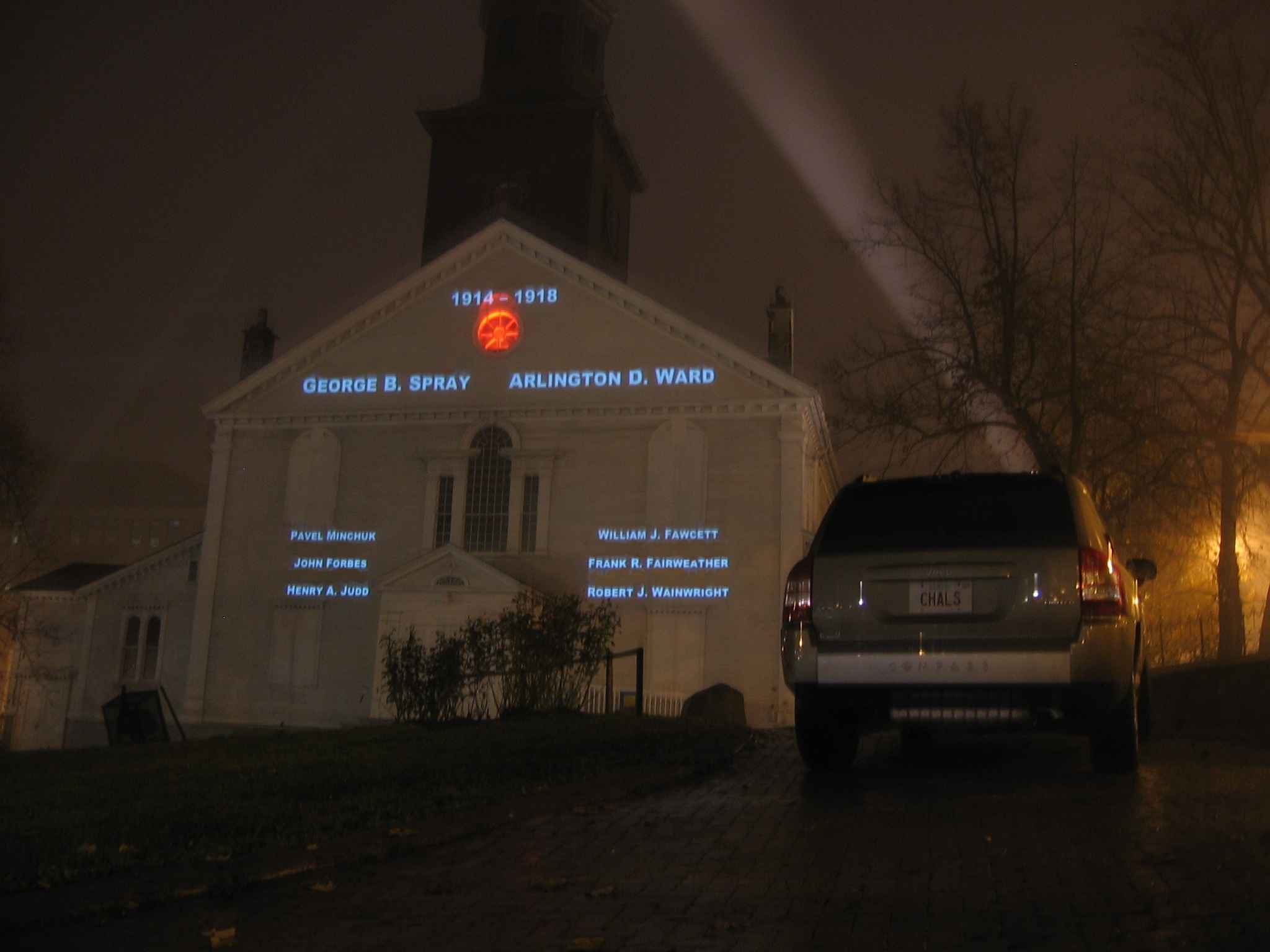
1914-1918-Vigil Project (2009). Names of more than 68,000 Canadians who died in WWI were projected over 6 nights onto monuments including St. Paul's Church in Halifax.

Thomson is married with two sons.

Thomson has had a long-standing interest in Canada's military and war veterans. In 1995 he narrated a three-part documentary series about Canada's involvement in international conflicts. On the 90th anniversary of the Battle of Vimy Ridge, in which nearly 3,600 Canadians died, he co-created, with lighting designer Martin Conboy, a commemoration in which the name of each soldier was projected onto the National War Memorial. The following year in 2009, he and Conboy undertook an ambitious project to project the names of the more than 68,000 Canadians who died in World War I onto famous monuments across the country. Projections occurred during the night. In 2010, the Government of Canada honoured Thomson for this effort with a Minister of Veterans Affairs Commendation.

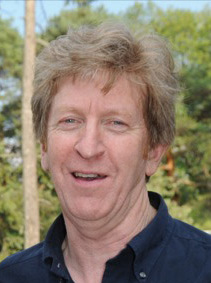
R.H. Thomson at a CFC reception, for Business for the Arts, 2013

== Filmography ==
=== Film ===
| Year | Title | Role | Notes |
|---|---|---|---|
| 1979 | Jigsaw (L'Homme en colère) | Borke | |
| 1981 | Ticket to Heaven | Linc Strunc | |
| 1981 | Surfacing | David | |
| 1981 | Happy Memories | Rick | |
| 1982 | If You Could See What I Hear | Will Sly | |
| 1983 | Snow | Jim | Short |
| 1985 | Vision Quest | Kevin | |
| 1985 | Martin's Day | Paul Mennen | |
| 1985 | Samuel Lount | Samuel Lount | |
| 1987 | Wednesday's Children: David | Jim | Short |
| 1989 | The First Season | Eric Anderson | |
| 1990 | Defy Gravity | Bill Fiddich | |
| 1991 | The Quarrel | Chaim Kovler | |
| 1993 | The Lotus Eaters | Hal Kingswood | |
| 1994 | Max | Andy Blake | |
| 1995 | Duncan Campbell Scott: The Poet and the Indians | Duncan Campbell Scott | |
| 1997 | Twilight of the Ice Nymphs | Dr. Isaac Solti | |
| 1997 | Silent Cradle | David Greg | |
| 1998 | Bone Daddy | Stone | |
| 2000 | Bonhoeffer: Agent of Grace | Knobloch | |
| 2006 | Population 436 | Sheriff Jim Calcutt | Video |
| 2006 | Who Loves the Sun | Arthur Bloom | |
| 2008 | Well Kept Secrets - Athanassia | Manuel | |
| 2009 | Chloe | Frank | |
| 2010 | New Year | Terry Cook | |
| 2010 | Whirligig | Andre | |
| 2011 | Jesus Henry Christ | Billy Herman | |
| 2018 | Clara | Dr. Rickman | |
| 2022 | Stellar | Professor | |

=== Television ===
| Year | Title | Role | Notes |
|---|---|---|---|
| 1976 | Of the Fields, Lately | Ben Mercer | TV movie |
| 1978 | Tyler | Tyler Dorsett | TV movie |
| 1979 | An American Christmas Carol | Thatcher | TV movie |
| 1980 | A Population of One | John Trueman | TV movie |
| 1981 | Escape from Iran: The Canadian Caper | Lee Schatz | TV movie |
| 1982 | I Married the Klondike | Frank Berton | Miniseries |
| 1983 | The Terry Fox Story | Dr. Simon | TV movie |
| 1983 | Cornet at Night | The Stranger | TV movie |
| 1985 | Charlie Grant's War | Charlie Grant | Miniseries |
| 1985 | The Ray Bradbury Theater | Morgan | Episode: "The Crowd" |
| 1986 | The Marriage Bed | Dr. Jeff Reilly | TV movie |
| 1986 | Philip Marlowe, Private Eye | Frank Barsley | Episode: "Red Wind" |
| 1987 | Stranger in My Bed | Dr. Davidson | TV movie |
| 1987 | And Then You Die | Det. Sgt. James McGrath | TV movie |
| 1987 | Heaven on Earth | Wilf Hawthorne | TV movie |
| 1987 | Ford: The Man and the Machine | Edsel Ford | TV movie |
| 1987 | Moonlighting | Dr. Steven Hill | Episodes: "Tale in Two Cities" & "Father Knows Last" |
| 1988 | Glory Enough for All | Dr. Frederick Banting | TV movie |
| 1988 | The Campbells | Andrew Jordan | Episode: "Last Time Around" |
| 1988 | The Twilight Zone | Dr. Burrell | Episode: "Our Selena Is Dying" |
| 1989 | Champagne Charlie | Robert Morgan | TV movie |
| 1989 | Love and Hate: The Story of Colin and JoAnn Thatcher | Gerry Allbright | TV movie |
| 1990–1996 | Road to Avonlea | Jasper Dale | Recurring role |
| 1991 | Mark Twain and Me | Albert Paine | TV movie |
| 1992–1993 | By Way of the Stars | Priest | Miniseries |
| 1993 | Bonds of Love | Jake Hobart | TV movie |
| 1994 | The Babymaker: The Dr. Cecil Jacobson Story | Bill Castellano | TV movie |
| 1994 | My Breast | Luke | TV movie |
| 1994 | Bizet's Dream | Delaborde/Escamillo | TV movie |
| 1995 | Net Worth | Milton Mound | TV movie |
| 1996 | Murder at My Door | Ed McNair | TV movie |
| 1999 | Cry Rape | Ray Marcassi | TV movie |
| 1999 | P.T. Barnum | James Anthony Bailey | TV movie |
| 2000 | The Dinosaur Hunter | Rev. Smythe | TV movie |
| 2000 | The Secret Adventures of Jules Verne | Count Nicolai Kugarin | Episode: "Rocket to the Moon" |
| 2001 | The Associates | Angus MacGregor | Episode: "Headfirst Into Hell" |
| 2001 | The Royal Scandal | Mycroft Holmes | TV movie |
| 2002 | The Stork Derby | Hugh McLean | TV movie |
| 2002 | Trudeau | Mitchell Sharp | TV movie |
| 2002 | Hell on Heels: The Battle of Mary Kay | Richard Rogers | TV movie |
| 2002 | Tom Stone | Peter Krieghoff | Episode: "Deal" |
| 2002 | University | Harry Copeland | Episode: "Welcome to Dorchester" |
| 2003 | Bugs | Reynolds | TV movie |
| 2003 | The Piano Man's Daughter | Frederick Wyatt | TV movie |
| 2003 | Full-Court Miracle | Rabbi Lewis | TV movie |
| 2004 | Human Cargo | Peter Fowler | Miniseries |
| 2006 | Prairie Giant | Dr. Moulds | Miniseries |
| 2006 | October 1970 | James Cross | Miniseries |
| 2008 | The Englishman's Boy | Tom Hardwick | Miniseries |
| 2010 | Republic of Doyle | Francis Chafe | Episode: "The Tell-Tale Safe" |
| 2012 | King | Randall King | Episode: "Freddy Boise" |
| 2013 | Cracked | Robert Kelly | Episode: "The Valley" |
| 2016 | Love's Complicated | Senator | TV movie |
| 2017–2019 | Anne with an E | Matthew Cuthbert | Main role |
| 2024 | Murdoch Mysteries | Chief Inspector Francis Stewart | Episodes: "A Heavy Heart" & "Smoke Gets in Your Eyes" |
| 2024 | Murder in a Small Town | Carlyle Burke | Episode: "The Suspect" |

== Awards ==
=== Wins ===
- 1989 : Gemini Award, for Glory Enough for All
- 1983 : Gemini Award, for If You Could See What I Hear
- 2015: Governor General's Performing Arts Award for Lifetime Artistic Achievement (Theatre)
- 2018 : Canadian Screen Award, for Best Supporting Actor in a Drama Anne with an E

=== Nominations ===
- 1982 : Genie Award, for Ticket to Heaven
- 1986 : Genie Award, for Samuel Lount
- 1986 : Gemini Award, for Canada's Sweetheart: The Saga of Hal C. Banks
- 1987 : Gemini Award, for Screen Two
- 1987 : Gemini Award, for Ford: The Man and the Machine
- 1988 : Gemini Award, for And Then You Die
- 1993 : Genie Award, for The Lotus Eaters
- 1994 : Gemini Award, for Road to Avonlea
- 2008 : Gemini Award, for The Englishman's Boy
