= Canadian Film Awards =

Former Canadian film awards

- Awarded for: Best film productions in Canada
- Country: Canada
- First award: 1949
- Final award: 1978

The Canadian Film Awards were the leading Canadian cinema awards from 1949 until 1978. These honours were conducted annually, except in 1974 when a number of Quebec directors withdrew their participation and prompted a cancellation. In the 1970s, they were sometimes known as the Etrog Awards for sculptor Sorel Etrog, who designed the statuette.

The awards were succeeded by the Academy of Canadian Cinema & Television's Genie Awards in 1980. In 2013, the Academy merged the Genie Awards with its separate Gemini Awards program for television to create the contemporary Canadian Screen Awards.

== History ==
The award was first established in 1949 by the Canadian Association for Adult Education, under a steering committee that included the National Film Board's James Beveridge, the Canadian Foundation's Walter Herbert, filmmaker F. R. Crawley, the National Gallery of Canada's Donald Buchanan and diplomat Graham McInnes. The initial jury consisted of Hye Bossin, managing editor of Canadian Film Weekly; M. Stein of Famous Players; CBC film critic Gerald Pratley; Moira Armour of the Toronto and Vancouver Film societies; and Ian MacNeill from CAAE. The Canadian Foundation and the Canadian Film Institute were also brought in as sponsors of the awards.

The first presentation was held on April 27, 1949 at the Little Elgin Theatre in Ottawa.

With only a handful of Canadian films released each year, they were generally a small affair. Unlike the eligibility rules for the contemporary Canadian Screen Awards, which are based on the film having already been screened theatrically in either commercial release or the film festival circuit, in the Canadian Film Awards era films, even if otherwise unreleased, were eligible for nominations or awards based solely on their submission to a dedicated Canadian Film Awards screening festival.

In 1957, The Globe and Mail columnist Ronald Johnson criticized the awards' publicity efforts, noting that even Bossin was not actually receiving the press releases and that many of the releases which were going out were being sent to journalists not involved in covering or reporting on film. The paper's film critic Jay Scott later described them as "honours given by presenters no one knew, to recipients no one recognized, to films no one had seen."

With very few feature films made in Canada at all prior to the 1960s, in some years no Film of the Year winner was named at all, with the awards for Best Short Film or Best Amateur Film instead constituting the highest honour given to a film that year. Even the award for Film of the Year, when presented at all, often also went to a short film. The awards were also almost totally dominated by the National Film Board, to the point that independent filmmakers sometimes alleged a systemic bias which was itself a contributing factor to the difficulty of building a sustainable commercial film industry in Canada. Particularly in the 1960s, television films were also eligible for the awards; in 1969, in fact, no theatrical films were entered into the awards at all, and the nominees and winners at the 21st Canadian Film Awards consisted almost entirely of television films. Despite the creation of the ACTRA Awards in 1972, the Canadian Film Awards continued to present selected "non-feature" awards, inclusive of television films, until the 1st Genie Awards in 1980.

A separate award for Best Feature Film was instituted in 1964. Acting awards were introduced in 1968, and then expanded into separate categories for lead and supporting performers in 1970.

In 1968, the consortium of organizations that presented the awards up to that point discontinued their involvement, and the awards were reorganized into their own independent organization with their own board of directors. A new bronze award statuette was designed by sculptor Sorel Etrog, and thereafter the award was often referred to as an Etrog, although the name of the ceremony itself remained the Canadian Film Awards. Two special awards, the John Grierson Award for outstanding contribution to Canadian cinema and the Wendy Michener Award for outstanding artistic achievement, were also added in later years.

=== Quebec crisis of the 1970s ===
In the 1970s, the organization frequently faced crises related to the francophone film industry in Quebec. This began in 1970, when filmmaker Jean Pierre Lefebvre threatened to withdraw his film Q-Bec My Love from the competition if the Ontario Censor Board did not withdraw its demand for the film to be edited. Several other filmmakers were also prepared to withdraw in solidarity, although provincial cabinet minister James Auld intervened to dissuade the board from insisting on the cuts.

In 1973, a number of Quebec filmmakers boycotted the 25th Canadian Film Awards, out of a perception that the organization had a systemic bias against francophone films. This protest resulted in the last-minute cancellation of the 1973 awards ceremony, with the winners announced only at a press conference, and the complete cancellation of the 1974 awards. When the awards returned in 1975, the eligibility period covered the entire two-year period since the previous ceremony in 1973; however, the awards committee revived the defunct Film of the Year category alongside the ongoing Best Feature Film award, so that two Best Pictures, one for each of 1974 and 1975, could be named. The 1973 awards were also criticized for the jury's choice of Slipstream as Best Feature Film over a field of four other much stronger nominees, with some writers later declaring that the film's victory, over enduring Canadian film classics such as Kamouraska and Réjeanne Padovani, essentially confirmed that the boycotting directors were correct in their beliefs.

=== Evolution into the Genie Awards ===
In the final years of the Canadian Film Awards, the dedicated festival was discontinued, and instead the eligible films were screened as part of the Festival of Festivals lineup after that event was launched in 1976, with the ceremony taking place at the end of the festival.

After 1978, the awards were taken over by the new Academy of Canadian Cinema and Television, and reorganized into the new Genie Awards. Despite the renaming, Etrog's statuette was initially retained as the design of the Genie statuettes; they later underwent a modernized revamp, but were still based on Etrog's original design. The Genie Awards continued to be presented until 2012, when the Academy merged them with its Gemini Awards program for television to create the contemporary Canadian Screen Awards.

After launching the Genies, the Academy of Canadian Cinema and Television created the Bijou Awards, which were presented in 1981 as a new home for several award categories that were being dropped from the Genies, although the Bijous were never presented again after 1981, and instead the Gemini Awards were launched in 1986 to replace the ACTRAs as Canada's primary television awards.

When Academy publicist Maria Topalovich was preparing a history of the awards for publication in the early 1980s, she found that even the Academy itself had not received complete documentation of the awards' past winners and nominees in the takeover, and instead she had to undertake extensive archival research.

== Awards ceremonies ==
The following is a listing of all Canadian Film Awards Ceremonies.

Ceremony	Date	Host(s)	Venue	Film of the Year	Feature Film (1964–78)
1st Canadian Film Awards	April 27, 1949	Robert Winters	Little Elgin Theatre, Ottawa, Ontario	The Loon's Necklace	None awarded
2nd Canadian Film Awards	April 19, 1950	Prime Minister Louis St. Laurent	Little Elgin Theatre, Ottawa, Ontario	None awarded	None awarded
3rd Canadian Film Awards	April 22, 1951	Mary Pickford	Odeon Theatre, Ottawa, Ontario	None awarded	None awarded
4th Canadian Film Awards	April 27, 1952	Sidney Earle Smith	Victoria Theatre, Toronto, Ontario	Newfoundland Scene	None awarded
5th Canadian Film Awards	April 30, 1953	Jacques DesBaillets (with guest Dorothy Lamour)	Avenue Theatre, Montreal, Quebec	Tit-Coq	None awarded
6th Canadian Film Awards	May 10, 1954	J. R. White (Imperial Oil president)	Kent Theatre, Montreal, Quebec	The Seasons	None awarded
7th Canadian Film Awards	1955	No public ceremony	No public ceremony	The Stratford Adventure	None awarded
8th Canadian Film Awards	August 6, 1956	Maurice Evans	Avon Theatre, Stratford, Ontario	None awarded	None awarded
9th Canadian Film Awards	June 15, 1957	Leonard Brockington	King Edward Hotel, Toronto, Ontario	None awarded	None awarded
10th Canadian Film Awards	June 21, 1958	Davidson Dunton	King Edward Hotel, Toronto, Ontario	City of Gold	None awarded
11th Canadian Film Awards	June 5, 1959	W. J. Sheridan	King Edward Hotel, Toronto, Ontario	None awarded	None awarded
12th Canadian Film Awards	June 3, 1960	Albert Trueman	King Edward Hotel, Toronto, Ontario	None awarded	None awarded
13th Canadian Film Awards	May 13, 1961	Alphonse Ouimet	King Edward Hotel, Toronto, Ontario	Universe	None awarded
14th Canadian Film Awards	May 26, 1962	Andrew Stewart	King Edward Hotel, Toronto, Ontario	None awarded	None awarded
15th Canadian Film Awards	May 10, 1963	Jeanine Beaubien	Queen Elizabeth Hotel, Montreal, Quebec	Lonely Boy	None awarded
16th Canadian Film Awards	May 8, 1964	Wayne and Shuster	Royal York Hotel, Toronto, Ontario	Pour la suite du monde	À tout prendre
17th Canadian Film Awards	May 15, 1965	Max Ferguson	Westbury Hotel, Toronto, Ontario	None awarded	The Luck of Ginger Coffey
18th Canadian Film Awards	May 6, 1966	Rich Little	Queen Elizabeth Hotel, Montreal, Quebec	The Mills of the Gods: Viet Nam	Mission of Fear (Astataïon, ou Le Festin des Morts)
19th Canadian Film Awards	September 23, 1967	Fred Davis	Inn on the Park, Toronto, Ontario	Warrendale	Warrendale
20th Canadian Film Awards	October 4, 1968	Bill Walker, Louise Marleau	Seaway Towers Hotel, Toronto, Ontario	A Place to Stand	The Ernie Game
21st Canadian Film Awards	October 4, 1969	Fred Davis	Royal York Hotel, Toronto, Ontario	The Best Damn Fiddler from Calabogie to Kaladar	None awarded
22nd Canadian Film Awards	October 3, 1970	Bill Walker	Imperial Theatre, Toronto, Ontario	To See Or Not to See (Psychocratie)	Goin' Down the Road
23rd Canadian Film Awards	October 1, 1971	Leslie Nielsen	Royal York Hotel, Toronto, Ontario	None awarded	Mon oncle Antoine
24th Canadian Film Awards	October 13, 1972	Jacques Fauteux	Ontario Place Cinesphere, Toronto, Ontario	None awarded	Wedding in White
25th Canadian Film Awards	October 12, 1973	Press conference, no formal ceremony	Chevalier Theatre, Montreal, Quebec	None awarded	Slipstream
26th Canadian Film Awards	October 12, 1975	No Ceremony in 1974		The Apprenticeship of Duddy Kravitz	None awarded
26th Canadian Film Awards	October 12, 1975	Peter Gzowski	Shaw Festival, Niagara-on-the-Lake, Ontario	Orders (Les Ordres)	Orders (Les Ordres)
27th Canadian Film Awards	October 21, 1976	Lorne Greene	CFTO-TV Studios, Scarborough, Ontario	None awarded	Lies My Father Told Me
28th Canadian Film Awards	November 20, 1977	Gordon Pinsent	Hilton Harbour Castle Hotel, Toronto, Ontario	None awarded	J.A. Martin photographe
29th Canadian Film Awards	September 21, 1978	John Candy, Catherine O'Hara	Ryerson Theatre, Toronto, Ontario	None awarded	The Silent Partner
Genie Awards from 1980
Ceremony	Date	Host(s)	Venue	Film of the Year	Feature Film (1964–78)
