= The Passionate Eye =

Canadian documentary television series

The Passionate Eye is a Canadian documentary television series that showcases documentary programming focusing on topics of news, current affairs, politics, and social issues. Airing on CBC Television and CBC News Network, the program airs a mixture of Canadian and international documentaries; some are original to the program, while others are feature documentaries that previously had a theatrical run, or television documentaries that previously or concurrently aired on other public television broadcasts in the United States or the United Kingdom.

Originally hosted by Douglas Leiterman, the program premiered in 1992 on CBC Newsworld as a showcase to rebroadcast classic documentary films, with noteworthy broadcasts in the inaugural season including Warrendale, Summer in Mississippi and The Mills of the Gods: Viet Nam. Leiterman would often also conduct new interviews with the filmmakers about their work on the films presented.

In its second season, it began to introduce newer documentaries into its programming, with its mix of older and newer films evolving much more strongly toward newer films as the show continued.

Michaëlle Jean became host of the program in 2000, holding the role until she was appointed the new Governor General of Canada in 2005. Jean was not immediately replaced by a permanent host; the series continued under a hostless format until 2015, when Wendy Mesley finally took the reins as a permanent host.

The series initially aired on Sunday and Monday nights. Debuting documentaries, the Sunday programme was titled The Passionate Eye Sunday Showcase (or, The Passionate Eye - Sunday); whereas the Monday-night feature was titled The Passionate Eye - Monday. The series eventually dropped the "Sunday" and "Monday" from its heading when it began to air episodes more regularly into its third decade.

The show has consistently aired on CBC News Network throughout its run; its broadcast on the main CBC Television network has varied, with the terrestrial network airing the show some seasons, or running other documentary series such as Doc Zone and Firsthand instead of The Passionate Eye at other times. Going into 2021, CBC made various changes to its documentary commissioning operations, dropping the other series and reuniting its documentary broadcasts on both the terrestrial and news channels under the Passionate Eye brand.

Similar documentary services of CBC's include: The Nature of Things, which commissions one-hour science and nature documentaries; documentary Channel, which commissions feature-length documentaries; and CBC Short Docs, which greenlights shorter-form documentaries and digital shorts.

== Episodes ==
=== Season 23 ===
No.	Title	Directed by	Original release date
1	"Inside China's Digital Gulag"	Robin Barnwell	December 31, 2019

=== Season 26 ===
No.	Title	Directed by	Original release date
1	"Surviving 9/11"	Arthur Cary	September 11, 2021
2	"Nike's Big Bet: Alberto Salazar and the Fine Line of Sport"	Paul Kemp	September 17, 2021
An investigation into the doping allegations around Alberto Salazar. Winner of the Canadian Screen Award for Best Sports Program or Series at the 10th Canadian Screen Awards in 2022.
3	"Mashkawi-Manidoo Bizmaadiziwin: Spirit to Soar"	Michelle Derosier, Tanya Talaga	September 24, 2021
4	"Are You Scared Yet, Human?"	Matthew Hill	October 1, 2021
5	"Harry and William: What Went Wrong?"	Unknown	October 8, 2021
6	"My Childhood, My Country: 20 Years in Afghanistan"	Phil Grabsky, Shoaib Sharifi	October 15, 2021
7	"The Return: Life After ISIS"	Alba Sotorra	October 22, 2021
8	"Dreamland: The Burning of Black Wall Street, Part 1"	Salima Koroma	October 29, 2021
9	"Dreamland: The Burning of Black Wall Street, Part 2"	Salima Koroma	November 5, 2021
10	"The Dissident"	Bryan Fogel	November 2021

=== Season 27 ===
No.	Title	Directed by	Original release date
1	"Into the Weeds"	Jennifer Baichwal	September 16, 2022
2	"Deconstructing Karen"	Patty Ivins Specht	September 22, 2022
3	"The Pretendians"	Drew Hayden Taylor	September 29, 2022
4	"The Conservation Game"	Michael Webber	October 7, 2022
5	"The Real Mo Farah"	Leo Burley	October 13, 2022
6	"The Talented Mr. Rosenberg"	Barry Avrich	October 20, 2022
7	"Across & Down"	Rachel Bower	October 27, 2022
8	"Seeds of Deceit"	Miriam Guttmann	November 3, 2022
9	"Edward VIII: Britain's Traitor King"	Marion Milne	November 10, 2022
10	"Wall Street Blues"	Scott Harper	November 17, 2022
11	"Mariupol: The People's Story"	Robin Barnwell	November 24, 2022
12	"My Old School"	Jono McLeod	December 1, 2022
13	"A Once and Future Peace"	Eric Daniel Metzgar	December 8, 2022
14	"Mission: Joy - Finding Happiness in Troubled Times"	Louie Psihoyos, Peggy Callahan	December 8, 2022

=== Season 28 ===
No.	Title	Directed by	Original release date
1	"Twice Colonized"	Lin Alluna	September 13, 2023
2	"Cyborg Society"	Alex Verner	September 20, 2023
3	"Inside the Shein Machine"	Iman Amrani	September 27, 2023
4	"Inside the Statue Wars"	Elizabeth St. Philip	October 4, 2023
5	"The Trouble with Kanye"	Stefan Mattison	October 11, 2023
6	"Doppelgangers: Face to Face"	Deborah Wainwright	October 18, 2023
7	"Searching for Satoshi: The Mysterious Disappearance of the Bitcoin Creator"	Paul Kemp	November 1, 2023
8	"Trafficked Voices"	Viveka Melki	November 8, 2023
8	"Warrior Soirit"	Will George	November 15, 2023
10	"Another Body"	Sophie Compton, Reuben Hamlyn	November 21, 2023
11	"Eternal Spring"	Jason Loftus	November 28, 2023
12	"The Secret World of Incels"	Ben Zand	December 4, 2023

=== Season 29 ===
No.	Title	Directed by	Original release date
1	"Sorry/Not Sorry"	Caroline Suh, Cara Mones	July 12, 2024
An examination of Louis C.K.'s efforts to come back from sexual misconduct allegations in 2017.
2	"Yintah"	Brenda Michell, Jennifer Wickham, Michael Toledano	September 18, 2024
Freda Huson, a Wetʼsuwetʼen leader, lobbies to protect her people's territory from gas and oil pipelines.
3	"Who's Afraid of Nathan Law?"	Joe Piscatella	September 20, 2024
Profile of Hong Kong democracy activist Nathan Law.
4	"Bodies for Rent"	Habiba Nosheen	September 25, 2024
People try to make a living as human lab rats, renting out their bodies for pharmaceutical drug testing.
5	"Eternal You"	Hans Block, Moritz Riesewieck	October 2, 2024
Profiles technology startups aspiring to use artificial intelligence to create avatars of the deceased.
6	"The Loneliest Race"	Alex Craig	October 9, 2024
Sailors compete in the 2022 Golden Globe Race.
7	"An Unfinished Journey"	Aeyliya Husain, Amie Williams	October 16, 2024
Activists Homaira Ayubi, Zefnoon Safai, Nargis Nehan and Nilofar Moradi continue to advocate for the protection of women's rights in Afghanistan.
8	"Harder Better Faster Stronger"	Brent Hodge	October 23, 2024
Profile of Travis Shumake, the first motorsport racer to come out as gay.
9	"No Way to Die"	Marc de Guerre	October 30, 2024
Two activists fight to be allowed to end their lives through assisted suicide.
10	"Adrianne and the Castle"	Shannon Walsh	November 6, 2024
Alan St. George maintains his home in rural Illinois as a shrine to his late wife Adrianne.
11	"My Brother, Soleiman"	Rendah Haj	November 13, 2024
Yusuf Faqiri pursues justice for the death of his schizophrenic brother in police custody.

=== Season 30 ===
No.	Title	Directed by	Original release date
1	"Lilith Fair: Building a Mystery"	Ally Pankiw	September 14, 2025
2	"The Ozempic Effect: Beyond the Waistline"	Paul Kemp	September 24, 2025
3	"Don't Come Upstairs"	Mike Lobel	September 1, 2025
4	"Michelle Ross: Unknown Icon"	Alison Duke	October 8, 2025
5	"Big Feminine Energy"	Susan Schafer	October 22, 2025
6	"The Psychic Swindle"	Sarah Gibson	October 22, 2025
7	"Swipe. Bet. Repeat."	Deborah Wainwright	November 5, 2025
8	"Breaking Idol"	Tiffany Hsiung	November 19, 2025
9	"Prime Minister"	Michelle Walshe, Lindsay Utz	November 26, 2025

== Foreign-produced documentaries ==
International documentaries showcased on The Passionate Eye include:

- Crumb — a profile of the satirical cartoonist Robert Crumb
- The Celluloid Closet — an investigation of Hollywood's treatment of homosexuals
- The Dying Rooms — an expose of the Chinese orphanages
- Russian Striptease — a stylistic look at sex and corruption in post-Perestroika Russia
- The Battle Over Citizen Kane — the impact of Citizen Kane between Orson Welles and William Randolph Hearst.
- Calling the Ghosts: A Story about Rape, War and Women — the personal journey of two Bosnian women, a lawyer and a judge, who were imprisoned during the civil war.
- In the Shadow of the Stars — behind-the-scenes look at the San Francisco Opera Company.
- For Better or For Worse (1993) — intimate portraits of five culturally-diverse couples who have been together for 50 years or longer.
- Fourteen Days in May — the last two weeks on death row with a man many believe to be innocent.
- Project Nim — the story of Nim Chimpsky, a chimpanzee who was the focus of a controversial experiment that aimed to show what would happen if baby chimps were taken from their mothers at birth and raised like humans.
- 10%: What Makes a Hero? — an investigation into why some people are willing to put themselves at risk in order to perform what others consider heroic deeds
- The Choice 2020: Trump vs. Biden — investigative biographies of then-President Donald Trump and former Vice President Joe Biden.
