= Don Haig =

Canadian filmmaker, editor and producer (1933–2002)

- Born: Donald George Haig; 22 July 1933; Winnipeg, Manitoba, Canada
- Died: 2 March 2002 (aged 68); Toronto, Ontario, Canada
- Occupations: Film producer Film editor
- Years active: 1955 - 1998
- Awards: Governor General's Awards; Academy Award; Genie Award

Don Haig (22 July 1933 — 2 March 2002) was a Canadian filmmaker, editor, and producer.

Haig's work in film and television spanned nearly five decades. Over the course of his career, he won Academy, Genie, and Gemini awards, and the Governor General's Performing Arts Award.

Haig was known as the "godfather of Canadian film" for nurturing young talent and producing many award-winning films. He is recognized by some as "the most important person on the Canadian film scene," helping create over 500 films.

== Career ==
Haig left high school after grade 9 and took a job repairing films at the Winnipeg distribution offices of MGM. In 1956, he moved to Toronto and was hired by the CBC film department, splicing commercials into The Ed Sullivan Show. After moving through the ranks and establishing a reputation as a superb editor, he left the CBC in 1962 and travelled to Europe, where he met Canadian producer/director Allan King. Back in Toronto, they joined with producer/director Beryl Fox to form their own company, Film Arts (aka Haig-King Film Arts). The CBC contracted Film Arts to edit and/or co-produce segments for This Hour Has Seven Days and the fifth estate, and CTV did the same for W5. Haig was editor on the Beryl Fox documentaries Fields of Endless Day, The Single Woman and the Double Standard, Summer in Mississippi and The Mills of the Gods: Viet Nam, which won Film of the Year at the 18th Canadian Film Awards in 1966.

In 1970, Haig co-founded the (now-defunct) Canadian Film Editors Guild. He was chairman of the Canadian Film and Television Association in 1972.

Among the films he helped produce was Artie Shaw: Time Is All You've Got, which was written and directed by Brigitte Berman in 1985. Oprah Winfrey presented Berman and Haig with an Oscar at the 59th Academy Awards.

After the 1992 sale of Film Arts to Film House, Haig joined the National Film Board of Canada and became head of English documentary production. He was noted for aiding young talent with funding, guidance, and editing. He retired in 1998.

== Personal life ==
Haig died of cancer at his home in Toronto in 2002, at age 68. His life partner was Bill Schultz, who is now the co-chair of the Don Haig Foundation.

== The Don Haig Foundation ==
In 2003, The Don Haig Foundation was established to support and recognize young filmmakers. In 2006, the foundation began a partnership with the Hot Docs Canadian International Documentary Festival to ensure a home for the Don Haig Award, a monetary award which is presented to a filmmaker with a feature-length entry at the festival. The Don Haig Award is presented annually to an outstanding Canadian independent producer, with the recipient selected by a jury of independent filmmakers. The award recognizes creative vision and entrepreneurship, as reflected in the recipient's body of work, as well as a track record of mentoring emerging Canadian filmmakers.

== Filmography ==
Film Arts

- The Single Woman and the Double Standard - documentary, Beryl Fox 1964 - editor
- Summer in Mississippi - documentary short, Beryl Fox 1965 - editor
- The Mills of the Gods: Viet Nam - documentary, Beryl Fox 1965 - editor
- A Path of His Own - Paul Caulfield 1970 - editor
- The National Dream: Building the Impossible Railway - James Murray, Eric Till 1974 - editor
- 125 Rooms of Comfort feature, Patrick Loubert 1974 - producer
- Serpent River Paddlers - documentary short, Anthony Hall 1975 - producer
- Pleasure Island - short film, Dan Wright 1975 - producer
- Fields of Endless Day - Terence Macartney-Filgate 1978 - editor
- Summer's Children - feature, Julius Kohanyi 1979 - co-producer
- Track Stars: The Unseen Heroes of Movie Sound - documentary short, Terry Burke 1979 - co-producer
- Carillon: The Bells of Song - documentary short 1979 - producer
- Portrait of Christine - documentary short 1979 - producer'
- Different Timbres - documentary, Claire Prieto & Roger McTair 1980 - executive producer
- A.J. Casson: The Only Critic is Time - documentary, Michael Morningstar 1981 - producer
- Alligator Shoes - feature, Clay Boris 1981 - co-producer
- A Helping Hand (The Nature of Things) - documentary short 1982 - co-producer
- K.C.I.: Beyond the Three R's - documentary short, Scott Barrie 1982 - editor
- Alex Colville: The Splendour of Order - documentary, Don Hutchison 1984 - executive producer
- Concertante: Arnold Spohr and the Royal Winnipeg Ballet - documentary, Gabriel Markiw 1984
- Unfinished Business - feature, Don Owen 1984 - co-executive producer
- Finding Out: Incest and Family Sexual Abuse - documentary short, Susan Murgatroyd 1984 - co-producer
- Artie Shaw: Time Is All You've Got - documentary, Brigitte Berman, Bridge Film Productions 1985 - associate producer
- D.P. Brown: Beyond Realism - documentary short, Athan Katsos 1985 - co-producer
- Samuel Lount - feature, Laurence Keane 1985 - co-producer
- Overnight - feature, Jack Darcus 1985 - co-producer
- Dancing in the Dark - feature, Leon Marr 1986 - co-producer
- Those Roos Boys and Friends - documentary, Barbara Boyden 1987 - co-writer, co-producer
- Home to Buxton - documentary short, Roger McTair & Claire Prieto 1987 - co-producer
- The Kidnapping of Baby John Doe - TV movie, Peter Gerretsen 1987 - executive producer
- I've Heard the Mermaids Singing - feature, Patricia Rozema 1987 - executive producer
- Dreams Beyond Memory - feature, Andrzej Markiewicz 1987 - executive producer
- Night Friend - feature, Peter Gerretsen 1987 - executive producer
- Deep Sea Conspiracy - feature, Michael Brun 1987 - co-producer
- Growing Up in America - documentary, Morley Markson 1988 - co-producer
- Comic Book Confidential - documentary, Ron Mann 1988 - co-producer
- Dear John - feature, Catherine Ord 1988 - co-producer
- Solitary Journey - documentary, Vic Sarin 1989 - co-producer
- Stanley Knowles: By Word and Deed - documentary short, Dan Curtis 1988 - producer
- Turnabout - feature, Don Owen 1988 - executive producer
- The Brain - feature, Edward Hunt 1988 - co-producer
- Shadow Dancing - feature, Lewis Furey 1988 - co-producer
- The Crow and the Canary - documentary short, Arnie Lipsey 1989 - producer
- Mob Story - feature, Gabriel Markiw & Jancarlo Markiw 1989 - co-producer
- Odyssey in August - documentary short, Stephen Roscoe 1989 - producer
- Termini Station - feature, Allan King 1989 - co-producer
- Special of the Day - documentary short, Robert Kennedy 1989 - producer
- The Midday Sun - feature, Lulu Keating 1989 - executive producer
- Freakshow - feature, Constantino Magnatta 1989 - executive producer
- St. Nicholas and the Children - feature, George Bloomfield 1989 - co-producer
- Defy Gravity - feature, Michael Gibson 1990 - co-producer
- In Advance of the Landing - documentary short, Dan Curtis 1990 - producer
- Elizabeth Smart: On the Side of Angels - documentary, Maya Gallus 1991 - executive producer
- Thick as Thieves - Steve DiMarco 1991 - co-producer
- White Light - feature, Al Waxman 1991 - executive producer
- The Heart of a Viking: The Story of Joe Boyle - documentary short, Pat Patterson 1991 - producer
- The Twist - documentary, Ron Mann 1992 - co-producer
- Just For Fun - documentary short, David Oiye 1993 - producer

National Film Board of Canada

- A Further Glimpse of Joey - documentary short, Don Owen 1966 - editor
- Timothy Findley: Anatomy of a Writer - documentary, Terence Macartney-Filgate 1992 - co-executive producer
- Nurses: The Heart of the System documentary, Tanya Tree 1992 - co-executive producer
- Secret Nation - feature, Michael Jones 1992 - executive producer
- First Nations: The Circle Unbroken - documentary series, Geraldine Bob, Gary Marcuse, Deanna Nyce & Lorna Williams 1993 - co-executive producer
- View from the Typewriter - documentary, Robert A. Duncan 1993 - co-executive producer
- Freedom Had a Price - documentary, Yurij Luhovy 1994 - executive producer
- Blockade - documentary, Nettie Wild 1994 - co-producer
- By Woman’s Hand - documentary, Pepita Ferrari 1994 - co-executive producer
- Seven Crows a Secret - documentary short, John Forrest 1994 - co-executive producer
- When Shirley Met Florence - documentary short, Ronit Bezalel 1994 - executive producer
- Trawna Tuh Belvul - animated short, Martin Rose 1994 - co-executive producer
- Dinosaurs: Piecing It All Together - documentary, Michael McKennirey 1994 - co-executive producer
- Children for Hire - documentary, Lyn Wright 1994 - co-executive producer
- The Summer of ‘67 - documentary, Albert Kish & Donald Winkler 1994 - executive producer
- Lessons - documentary, Paul Cowan 1995 - co-executive producer
- My Name is Kahentiiosta - documentary short, Alanis Obomsawin 1995 - executive producer
- 10-7 For Life - documentary, Cynthia Banks 1995 - co-executive producer
- Anatomy of Desire - documentary, Peter Tyler Boullata & Jean-François Monette 1995 - executive producer
- Canada Remembers: Part 1, Turning the Tide - documentary, Terence Macartney-Filgate 1995 - executive producer
- Canada Remembers: Part 2, The Liberators - documentary, Terence Macartney-Filgate 1995 - executive producer
- Canada Remembers: Part 3, Endings and Beginnings - documentary, Terence Macartney-Filgate 1995 - executive producer
- Baby Business - documentary, Judy Jackson 1995 - executive producer
- Multiple Choices - Blending - documentary short, Alison Burns 1995 - executive producer
- Multiple Choices - Choices - documentary short, Alison Burns 1995 - executive producer
- Multiple Choices - Community - documentary short, Alison Burns 1995 - executive producer
- Multiple Choices - Families - documentary short, Alison Burns 1995 - executive producer
- Multiple Choices - Forever After? - documentary short, Alison Burns 1995 - executive producer
- Multiple Choices - Loves Me, Loves Me Not - documentary short, Alison Burns 1995 - executive producer
- Multiple Choices - Picture Perfect - documentary short, Alison Burns 1995 - executive producer
- Multiple Choices - Power Lines - documentary short, Alison Burns 1995 - executive producer
- Multiple Choices - Searching - documentary short, Alison Burns 1995 - executive producer
- Multiple Choices - The Agony and the Ecstasy - documentary short, Alison Burns 1995 - executive producer
- Multiple Choices - Tying the Knot - documentary short, Alison Burns 1995 - executive producer
- Multiple Choices - Who, What, Where, When? - documentary short, Alison Burns 1995 - executive producer
- Multiple Choices - Who’s Who? - documentary short, Alison Burns 1995 - executive producer
- The Odyssey Diaries - documentary, Susan Fleming 1995 - co-executive producer
- The Reluctant Deckhand - short film, Jan Padgett 1995 - co-executive producer
- The Pinnacle and the Poet - documentary short, Louise Abbott 1995 - executive producer
- Who's Counting? Marilyn Waring on Sex, Lies and Global Economics - documentary, Terre Nash 1995 - co-executive producer
- Silence & Storm - documentary, Jeremiah Hayes 1995 - co-executive producer
- The Voyage of the St. Louis - documentary, Maziar Bahari 1995 - executive producer
- A Web of War - documentary, Brian McKenna 1995 - co-executive producer
- War at Sea: The Black Pit - documentary, Brian McKenna 1995 - executive producer
- War at Sea: U-Boats in the St. Lawrence - documentary, Brian McKenna 1995 - executive producer
- Le temps d'une guerre - documentary, Jacques Vallée 1995 - co-executive producer
- The Passerby - documentary, Donald McWilliams 1995 - co-executive producer
- The Marco Polo: Queen of the Seas - documentary, Roger Hart 1995 - co-executive producer
- Eldon Rathburn: They Shoot...He Scores - documentary short, Louis Hone 1995 - executive producer
- Mystery of the Maya - documentary short, Barrie Howells & Roberto Rochin 1995 - co-executive producer
- Broken Promises: The High Arctic Relocation - documentary, Patricia Tassinari, Ziad Hamzeh 1995 - executive producer
- Children First! - documentary, Jacques Vallée 1995 - executive producer
- Children of Jerusalem - Gesho - documentary short, Beverly Shaffer 1996 - executive producer
- Children of Jerusalem - Ibrahim - documentary short, Beverly Shaffer 1996 - executive producer
- Children of Jerusalem - Yehuda - documentary short, Beverly Shaffer 1996 - executive producer
- Fennario: His World on Stage - documentary short, Alec MacLeod 1996 - executive producer
- Marilyn Waring on Politics, Local & Global - documentary short, Terre Nash 1996 - co-executive producer
- Marilyn Waring on The Environment - documentary short, Terre Nash 1996 - co-executive producer
- Marilyn Waring on Women and Economics - documentary short, Terre Nash 1996 - co-executive producer
- Faces of the Hand - documentary short, Tamás Wormser 1996 - executive producer
- A Balkan Journey: Fragments from the Other Side of the War - documentary, Brenda Longfellow 1996 - co-executive producer
- Bronwen & Yaffa: Moving Towards Tolerance - documentary short, Peter d'Entremont 1996 - co-executive producer
- Chronicle of a Genocide Foretold: Part 1, Blood was Flowing Like a River - documentary, Danièle Lacourse & Yvan Patry 1996 - co-executive producer
- Chronicle of a Genocide Foretold: Part 2, We Were Cowards - documentary, Danièle Lacourse & Yvan Patry 1996 - co-executive producer
- Chronicle of a Genocide Foretold: Part 3, We Feel Betrayed - documentary, Danièle Lacourse & Yvan Patry 1996 - co-executive producer
- First Nation Blue - documentary, Daniel Prouty 1996 - executive producer
- Good Things Too - short film, Liz Scully 1996 - co-executive producer
- Packing Heat - documentary, Wendy Rowland 1996 - executive producer
- Tough Assignment - documentary, John Walker 1996 - executive producer
- The Power Game - documentary, Anne Henderson 1996 - co-producer and -executive producer
- Power - documentary, Magnus Isacsson 1996 - executive producer
- Sitting on a Volcano - documentary, Danièle Lacourse 1996 - co-executive producer
- Someone to Talk to: Peer-Helping in High School - documentary short, Annie Ilkow 1996 - executive producer
- The Spell of the Yukon - documentary, Rita Roy 1996 - executive producer
- Wanted! Doctor on Horseback - documentary, Claire Helman 1996 - executive producer
- You Won't Need Running Shoes, Darling - documentary, Dorothy Todd Hénaut 1996 - executive producer
- Murder Remembered: Norfolk County 1950 - documentary, Robert Fortier 1997 - executive producer
- The Need to Know - documentary, Tom Puchniak 1997 - co-producer and -executive producer
- The Petticoat Expeditions: Part One, Anna Jameson - documentary short, Pepita Ferrari 1997 - executive producer
- The Petticoat Expeditions: Part Two, The Countess of Aberdeen - documentary short, Pepita Ferrari 1997 - executive producer
- The Petticoat Expeditions: Part Three, Frances Hopkins - documentary short, Pepita Ferrari 1997 - executive producer
- The Gender Tango - documentary, Léa Pool 1997 co-producer and -executive producer
- All the Right Stuff - documentary short, Connie Littlefield 1997 - co-executive producer
- Barbed Wire and Mandolins - documentary, Nicola Zavaglia 1997 - executive producer
- Caregivers: Episode One: Madeleine and Rose - documentary, Dan Curtis 1997 - executive producer
- Caregivers: Episode Two: Doris and Tom - documentary, Dan Curtis 1997 - executive producer
- Caregivers: Episode Three: Kurt and Elizabeth - documentary, Dan Curtis 1997 - executive producer
- Caregivers: Episode Four: Pat and Molly - documentary, Dan Curtis 1997 - executive producer
- Caregivers: Episode Five: Paul and Jean - documentary, Dan Curtis 1997 - executive producer
- Circles - documentary, Shanti Thakur 1997 - executive producer
- The Battle of Vimy Ridge, Part 1: Setting the Stage - documentary short, John Bradshaw 1997 - co-producer and -executive producer
- The Battle of Vimy Ridge, Part 2: Keys to Victory - documentary short, John Bradshaw 1997 - co-producer and -executive producer
- The Battle of Vimy Ridge, Part 3: The Battle Looms - documentary short, John Bradshaw 1997 - co-producer and -executive producer
- Body Politics - documentary, Anne Henderson 1997 - co-producer, co-executive producer
- Creatures of the Sun - documentary short, Susan Trow 1997 - co-executive producer
- Alternate Route - documentary, Denise Withers 1997 - co-executive producer
- Spudwrench - documentary, Alanis Obomsawin 1997 - executive producer
- The Street: A Film with the Homeless - documentary, Daniel Cross 1997 - co-producer
- Jeunes, beaux et entreprenants - documentary, Liette Aubin, Denise Withers 1997 - co-executive producer
- A Place in the World - documentary, Robert Lang 1997 - co-producer
- Seven Brides for Uncle Sam - documentary, Anita Reilly McGee 1997 - co-executive producer
- Postcards from the Future - documentary, Joshua Chaplinsky, Kevin Kölsch, Dennis Widmyer 1997 - co-producer
- Victor-Martin, Diane and John - documentary, Steven Kellar 1997 - executive producer
- An Untidy Package - documentary, Debbie McGee 1997 - co-executive producer
- The Double Shift - documentary, Tom Puchniak 1997 - co-executive producer
- Kid Nerd - documentary, Shereen Jerrett 1997 - co-executive producer
- Louisbourg Under Siege - documentary, Albert Kish 1997 - executive producer
- David Fennario’s Banana Boots - documentary, Alec MacLeod 1998 - co-executive producer
- Desperately Seeking Helen - documentary, Eisha Marjara 1998 - co-executive producer
- Democracy à la Maude - documentary, Patricia Kearns 1998 - co-executive producer
- Labour of Love - documentary, Dan Curtis 1998 - co-executive producer
- Shylock - documentary, Pierre Lasry 1998 - executive producer
- The Illuminated Life of Maud Lewis - documentary, Peter d'Entremont 1998 - co-executive producer
- Asylum - documentary, Garry Beitel 1998 - co-executive producer
- The Kitchen Goddess - documentary, Donna Davies 1999 - co-executive producer
- Picturing a People: George Johnston, Tlingit Photographer - documentary, Carol Geddes 1999 - co-executive producer
- Under One Sky: Arab Women in North America Talk About the Hijab - documentary, Jennifer Kawaja 1999 - co-executive producer
- And So to Bed - documentary, Jeffrey McKay 1999 - co-executive producer
- Beyond Borders: Arab Feminists Talk About Their Lives...East and West - documentary, Jennifer Kawaja 1999 - co-executive producer
- Moving Pictures - documentary, Colin Low 2000 - co-executive producer
- Postcards from Canada - documentary, Tony Ianzelo, 2000 - co-executive producer
- Aftermath: The Remnants of War - documentary, Daniel Sekulich 2001 - co-executive producer

== Lifetime awards ==
- 6th Genie Awards, Toronto: Air Canada Award for Outstanding Contributions to the Canadian Film Industry, 1985
- Ontario Film Institute's Achievement Award, 1987
- City of Toronto Arts Award, 1991
- Governor General's Performing Arts Award, 1993
- In 1993, Haig received an honorary doctorate (D.Litt.) from York University.
