= Document (TV series) =

- Genre: Documentary
- Country of origin: Canada
- Original language: English
- No. of seasons: 7

Production
- Executive producers: Patrick Watson; Douglas Leiterman; Richard Nielsen (1968-1969)

Original release
- Network: CBC Television
- Release: September 16, 1962 – May 27, 1969

Document is a Canadian documentary television series that aired once a month on CBC Television from 1962 to 1969. This innovative series featured various documentaries, employing both direct cinema and traditional documentary techniques. The series, appearing on occasional random days and times, was given a monthly schedule in 1965 as a mid-year replacement for This Hour Has Seven Days.

The Toronto Telegram's Chester Bloom expressed criticism of bias over the broadcast of "The Servant of All" episode of September 16, 1962. Bloom's politics sided with the Progressive Conservative party.

== Production ==
The first executive producers for this series were Patrick Watson and Douglas Leiterman, whose intention was to air a documentary approximately each month to provide a detailed treatment of a subject. By the second season, Leiterman became executive producer on This Hour Has Seven Days and focused his attention on that series; Watson became a host of Document at that time. Richard Nielsen became executive producer during the final episodes.

=== Episodes ===
No.	Title	Producers	Original release date
1	"The Servant of All"	Beryl Fox and Douglas Leiterman	September 16, 1962
Selecting a Prime Minister
2	"Joshua, a Nigerian Portrait"	Allan King	March 6, 1963
3	"The Pull to the South"	TBA	March 21, 1963
Should Canada become "The 51st State"?
4	"The Balance of Terror"	Beryl Fox and Douglas Leiterman	July 28, 1963
5	"The Peacemakers"	Allan King	November 26, 1963
pacifism
6	"The Quiet Takeover"	Douglas Leiterman	December 15, 1963
computers
7	"The Chief"	Beryl Fox and Douglas Leiterman	March 25, 1964 (rebroadcast January 31, 1965)
John Diefenbaker
8	"Bjorn's Inferno"	Allan King	April 20, 1964
poet Bjorn Halverson
9	"The Image Makers"	TBA	May 20, 1964
American and Canadian public relations
10	"The Single Woman and the Double Standard"	Beryl Fox	December 13, 1964
11	"Richard and Lillian: Two Portraits"	TBA	December 27, 1964
12	"Strike: Man Against Computers"	Larry Zolf	March 28, 1965
13	"At the Moment of Impact"	Jim Carney	November 7, 1965
14	"The Mills of the Gods: Viet Nam"	Beryl Fox	December 5, 1965
Vietnam War
15	"Joan Baez"	TBA	December 26, 1965
Joan Baez
16	"A Sense of Captivity"	Ross McLean	January 23, 1966
Canadian prison system
17	"The Story of Sandy"	TBA	February 27, 1966
18	"How to Go Out of Your Mind"	TBA	April 24, 1966
the Millbrook experiments involving LSD
19	"No Balm in Gilead"	TBA	September 22, 1968
20	"Resurrection City"	Robert Hoyt (director)	November 17, 1968
the Poor People's Campaign
21	"Occupation"	TBA	February 23, 1969
22	"Violence"	James Shaw and John David Hamilton	April 13, 1969
23	"If I Don't Agree, Must I Go Away?"	Peter Pearson	May 27, 1969
