= Travis Shumake =

American drag racer and advocate

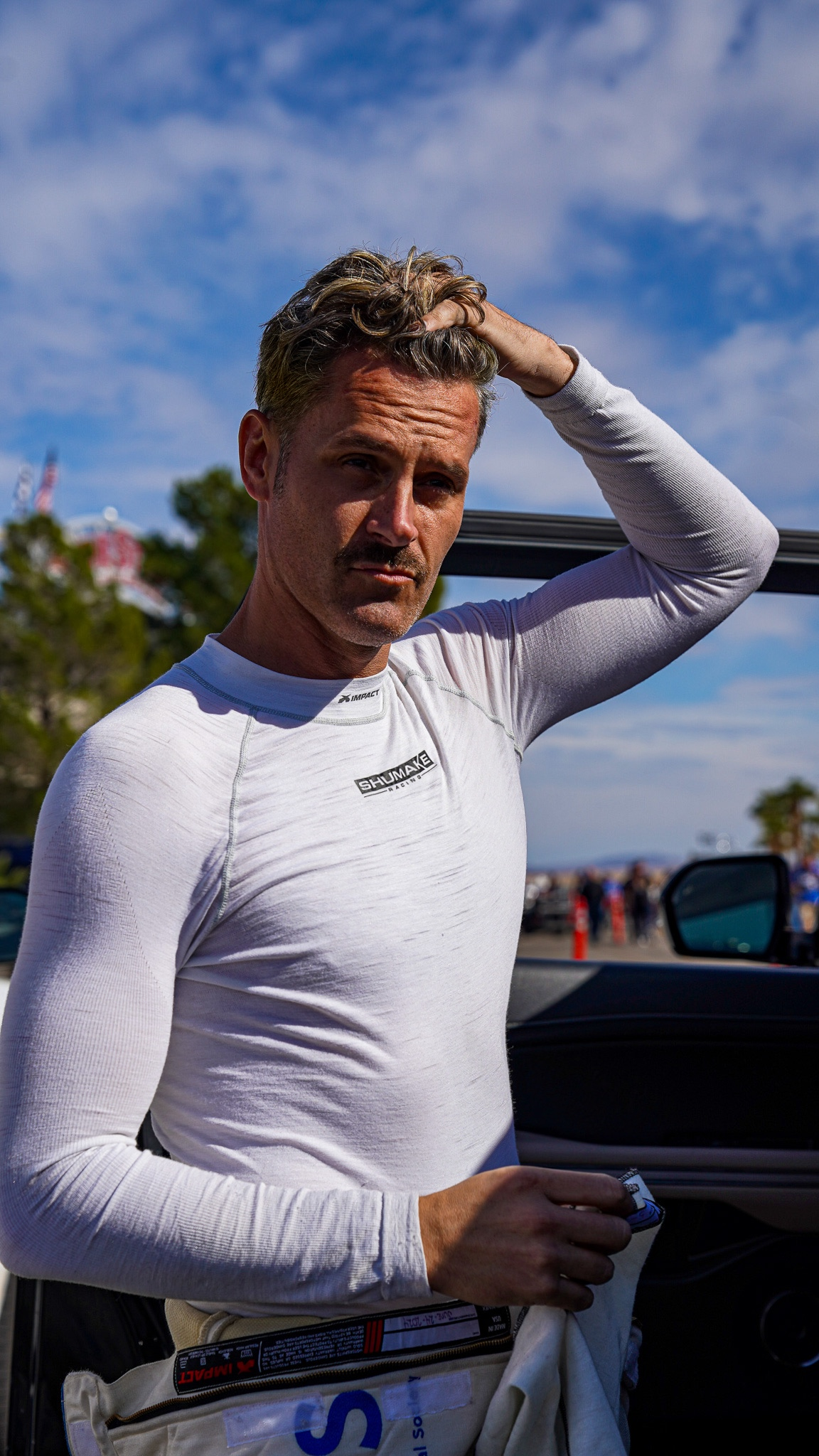
- Shumake at the 2024 NHRA Arizona Nationals
- Born: August 10, 1984 (age 41); Phoenix, Arizona, U.S.
- Occupations: NHRA Top Fuel driver, Team owner, LGBTQ+ advocate
- Known for: First openly gay Top Fuel drag racer
- Partner: Daryl (engaged)
- Website: travisshumake.com

Travis Cody Shumake (born August 10, 1984) is an American drag racer, team owner, and LGBTQ+ advocate. He competes in the NHRA Top Fuel category and is recognized as the first openly gay driver to regularly compete in the top level of any global touring motorsports league.

== Early life and education ==
Shumake was born and raised in Phoenix, Arizona. He is the son of NHRA Funny Car legend Tripp Shumake and Susie Shumake, a skilled mechanic and member of the Arizona Drag Racing Hall of Fame. After his father's passing in 1999, Travis shifted his focus from racing to competitive cheerleading, eventually earning a collegiate scholarship at Northern Arizona University.

While at NAU, Shumake served as student body president and was active in Sigma Chi and athletics. Shumake earned the university's True Blue and Gold Award, was Homecoming King, and was named Greek Life Man of the Year.

== Career ==
=== Non-profit work ===
Before returning to racing, Shumake built a successful career in nonprofit development. He held leadership roles at organizations such as one·n·ten, the Clinton Foundation, and currently at the Ali Forney Center, focusing on LGBTQ+ youth experiencing homelessness. He has also served on multiple boards including Phoenix Suns Charities 88 and Ronald McDonald House Charities of Central and Northern Arizona.

=== Return to racing ===
Inspired by his late father's legacy, Shumake returned to the dragstrip in 2021. He earned a series of 250 MPH+ NHRA license through training at Frank Hawley Drag Racing School and by completing licensing runs at major venues including Las Vegas Motor Speedway, Firebird Motorsports Park, Gainesville Raceway and the Texas Motorplex.

In 2022, Shumake made his Top Alcohol Dragster debut driving for Randy Meyer Racing at the Menards NHRA Nationals in Topeka, Kansas, where he became the target of a protest by the Westboro Baptist Church. He responded by leaning into his identity, debuting rainbow parachutes sponsored by Grindr.

In his second race in Top Alcohol, driving the Sheetz dragster, Shumake advanced to the semifinals of the Pep Boys NHRA Nationals in Reading, Pennsylvania on back-to-back hole shot wins.

=== Top Fuel ===
Shumake earned his Top Fuel license in the fall 2023 behind the wheel of a dragster he purchased from Scrappers Racing - Mike Salinas. He made his professional debut at the 2024 NHRA Arizona Nationals in Phoenix. Shumake finished 23rd in the 2024 Top Fuel Points Championship. In March 2025, Shumake set Top Speed of Eliminations at the Arizona Nationals with a 330.88 MPH pass in the first round against former world champion Doug Kalitta.

In April 2025, Shumake was profiled in the annual list of Drag Racing's "Movers, Shakers, and Deal Makers." Highlighting both his recent on-track success and quick assent into the top of the sport, the article fittingly leads with "The easiest way to get Travis Shumake to do something is to try and tell him he can’t."

While Shumake currently owns his race team, Shumake Racing is run as team car to Jasmine Salinas under the Scrappers Racing umbrella. He is currently pursuing sponsorship to run additional races in the 2025 season.

== Personal life ==
Shumake is openly gay and has been a visible advocate for inclusion in motorsports. He was featured in the 2024 Out 100 list and was the 2024 Stonewall Columbus Champion of Pride. In 2023, he was named Compete Magazine Professional Athlete of the Year. Shumake regularly appears in publications such as The Advocate, Outsports, Queerty, and the Human Rights Campaign Magazine. Interestingly, almost two decades before his racing success, he appeared on the cover of a 2005 The Advocate issue as a Future Gay Leader of America.

Shumake became engaged to his partner, Daryl, on Christmas Night 2024 on the deck of New York City's Staten Island Ferry. Their engagement was covered by Outsports and several other LGBTQ+ media.

In 2024, Shumake was profiled in Harder Better Faster Stronger, an episode of the CBC Television documentary series The Passionate Eye directed by Brent Hodge.

== NHRA Licenses & Performance Milestones ==
- Super Comp Dragster (2021)
- Nostalgia Funny Car/Top Alcohol Funny Car (2021)
- Nitro Funny Car - (2021) Not submitted passes (3.94 ET @319 MPH)
- Top Alcohol Dragster (2022)
- Top Fuel Dragster (2023)
- Top Speed - 330.88 MPH (March, 2025)
- Quickest ET - 3.71 Seconds (November, 2024)
