= The Mills of the Gods: Viet Nam =

- Directed by: Beryl Fox
- Produced by: Beryl Fox; Douglas Leiterman
- Cinematography: Erik Durschmied; Tim Page
- Edited by: Don Haig
- Production company: Canadian Broadcasting Corporation
- Distributed by: CBC Television
- Release date: 1965
- Running time: 56 min.
- Country: Canada
- Language: English

The Mills of the Gods: Viet Nam is a 1965 Canadian documentary film directed by Beryl Fox and narrated by Bernard B. Fall. Made in the direct cinema style, the film documents the Vietnam War.

In late 1965, Erik Durschmied shot The Mills of the Gods: Vietnam for the CBC series Document, produced and directed by Beryl Fox. During three weeks of filming Durschmied became ill, Tim Page was hired to continue filming until Durschmied regained full health.

The film aired on CBC Television on December 5, 1965, as an episode of Document, the documentary companion series to the news magazine This Hour Has Seven Days. At a time when the anti-war movement was in its infancy, the film opened conversations around the world.

In 1966, The Mills of the Gods: Viet Nam won the George Polk Award for Best Television Documentary and the Canadian Film Award for Film of the Year. National Educational Television distributed the film to American television stations in 1966.

== Synopsis ==
The documentary depicts scenes such as American military personnel on board the USNS General Simon B. Buckner, the pilot of a US Skyraider aircraft on a napalm bombing raid; life in Vietnam, Vietnamese people, Vietnamese villages, and the Mekong Delta. It also depicts interviews and discussions, such as American servicemen explaining why they signed up and Vietnamese citizens giving their opinion on the war.

Many scenes are grisly and shocking, such as a montage of the dead and wounded (including a corpse still clasping a grenade), a claim that military officers killed entire villages due to the presence of communists in them, the rubble of a Vietnamese village with visible corpses, and a Viet Cong prisoner being waterboarded. The recording of a jubilant pilot describing strafing and dropping napalm became a famous eyewitness account for many film makers.

The documentary claims that average Vietnamese citizens feel like they are paying for the war, that the Vietnamese want land reform and good governance to support the South Vietnamese government, and that the United States and South Vietnam are starting to win the war.
