= Venus (2017 film) =

- Directed by: Eisha Marjara
- Written by: Eisha Marjara
- Produced by: Joe Balass
- Starring: Debargo Sanyal; Jamie Mayers; Zena Darawalla; Pierre-Yves Cardinal; Gordon Warnecke
- Cinematography: Mark Ellam
- Edited by: Mathieu Bouchard-Malo
- Music by: Patrice Dubuc; Gaëtan Gravel
- Production company: Compass Productions
- Release date: October 9, 2017
- Running time: 95 minutes
- Country: Canada
- Language: English

Venus is a Canadian comedy-drama film, directed by Eisha Marjara and released in 2017. The film stars Debargo Sanyal as Sid, an Indo-Canadian who is just beginning to come out as a transgender woman when she unexpectedly discovers that she has a teenage son (Jamie Mayers) with a former high school girlfriend.

The cast also includes Zena Darawalla, Pierre-Yves Cardinal, Amber Goldfarb and Gordon Warnecke.

The film premiered on the film festival circuit in 2017, before going into general theatrical release in 2018.

== Awards and nominations ==
The film received a Canadian Screen Award nomination for Best Makeup (Tammy-Lou Pate) at the 7th Canadian Screen Awards in 2019.
