= A Third Testament =

- Country of origin: Canada
- Original language: English
- No. of seasons: 1
- No. of episodes: 6

Production
- Producers: Richard Nielsen; Pat Ferns; Jeremy Murray-Brown
- Running time: 60 minutes

Original release
- Network: CBC Television
- Release: 13 November – 18 December 1974

A Third Testament is a Canadian documentary television miniseries that aired on CBC Television from 1974 to 1975. A book based on the series was published subsequent to the broadcast.

== Premise ==
This documentary series was presented by Malcolm Muggeridge and concerned Christian religious faith. The series discussed the lives of Augustine of Hippo, Blaise Pascal, William Blake, Søren Kierkegaard, Leo Tolstoy and Dietrich Bonhoeffer. Muggeridge proposed that the combined works of these people had in effect created a "Third Testament".

Muggeridge also did a standalone television special in 1975 on Fyodor Dostoevsky and incorporated material from this work into the book adaptation of "A Third Testament".

== Production ==
The series was jointly produced by the CBC, Toronto company Nielsen-Ferns and Time-Life Films, with English and French language editions developed. Location filming was conducted in Europe and northern Africa. Original music for the series was composed and performed by Canadian composer John Mills-Cockell.

The series was produced in both French and English versions.

== Scheduling ==
Six hour-long episodes aired Wednesdays at 9:30 p.m. (Eastern) from 13 November to 18 December 1974. The series was rebroadcast 31 July to 4 September 1975.
