= Compete (disambiguation) =

Competition is any rivalry between two or more parties.

Compete may also refer to:

- Compete.com, a web traffic analysis company, 2000–2016
- Compete Magazine, an American monthly LGBT sports magazine

== See also ==
- Non-compete clause, a term in contract law where a person agrees not to compete
