= Mike Salinas =

Mike Salinas may refer to:

- Mike Salinas (American football)
- Mike Salinas (drag racer)
