= Target: The Impossible =

Canadian documentary television series

- Genre: Documentary
- Country of origin: Canada
- Original language: English
- No. of seasons: 1

Production
- Producers: Philip Hobel; Douglas Leiterman

Original release
- Network: CTV
- Release: September 1973 – 1974

Related
- Here Come the Seventies

Target: The Impossible is a Canadian documentary television series seen nationally on CTV from September 1973 to mid-1974 normally on Tuesday nights at 9:30 (Eastern).

The series was produced by Philip Hobel and Douglas Leiterman and focused on scientific achievements. However, Target: The Impossible concluded after one season, failing to repeat the longevity of their previous series Here Come the Seventies.
