= Background (TV program) =

Canadian journalistic television program

- Country of origin: Canada
- Original language: English
- No. of seasons: 3

Production
- Producer: Cliff Solway
- Running time: 20-30 minutes

Original release
- Network: CBC Television
- Release: 5 July 1959 – 1 January 1962

Background is a Canadian news television program that aired on CBC Television from 1959 to 1962.

== Premise ==
The program was an in-depth review of current news items. It replaced CBC's previous Sunday night news program This Week. It looked at the week's stories in more detail and was a forerunner to This Hour Has Seven Days. Its first season was hosted by University of Saskatchewan political science professor Rick Hart. Hart, however, was inexperienced in broadcasting and left the series after the first season. The program was led in following seasons by a selection of journalists and analysts who included Arnold Beichman, Alistair Cooke, Philip Deane, Robert Fulford, Robert McKenzie, Michael Maclear and Malcolm Muggeridge.

Documentaries featured on Background included features on various world regions, the United Nations, and The Rise and Fall of the Third Reich by William L. Shirer. Douglas Leiterman produced The Critical Years, a series within the Background program, for the final 1961–1962 seasons of the program.

== Production ==
Background was produced by Cliff Solway, who complained of difficulty finding guests who could provide a sufficiently forceful presentation for the show.

== Scheduling ==
For its first season, the program aired Sundays at 11:15 p.m. in a 25-minute time slot from 5 July 1959 to 26 June 1960. The next season, this was adjusted to a 20-minute time slot starting at 11:20 p.m. from 9 October 1960 to 1 January 1961. Background expanded to a 30-minute time slot at 10:00 p.m. Sundays from 19 February to 25 June 1961. In 1962, the program was randomly scheduled.
