= The Fabulous Sixties =

- Genre: Documentary miniseries
- Narrated by: Peter Jennings
- Country of origin: Canada
- Original language: English
- No. of seasons: 1
- No. of episodes: 10

Production
- Producers: Philip Hobel; Douglas Leiterman

Original release
- Network: CTV
- Release: 12 October 1969 – 1970

Related
- Here Come the Seventies

The Fabulous Sixties is a ten-part Canadian television documentary miniseries narrated by Peter Jennings. Each episode featured a year from the 1960s.

The programs were produced by Philip Hobel and Douglas Leiterman under the production units Hobel-Leiterman Productions and Document Associates. The duo then produced the regular-season series Here Come the Seventies and Target: The Impossible for CTV.

The first episode aired on CTV on 12 October 1969 with the following episodes broadcast as occasional specials into 1970. The series was released on DVD on 24 April 2007 by MPI Home Video.

== Episodes ==
- "1960, Be a Man – Sell Out" (aired 12 October 1969)
- "1961, Victory Has a Hundred Feathers"
- "1962, Morality and Brinkmanship"
- "1963, End of a Thousand Days"
- "1964, From Liverpool With Love" (aired 25 January 1970)
- "1965" (no additional detail in title) (aired 15 February 1970)
- "1966, Life, liberty and the pursuit of violence"
- "1967, Love is in the Streets... Death in the Desert"
- "1968, Up Against the Wall"
- "1969, The Eagle Has Landed"
