= Crossfire (Canadian TV program) =

- Genre: Current affairs
- Country of origin: Canada
- Original language: English
- No. of seasons: 1
- No. of episodes: 4

Production
- Producers: Cliff Solway; Art Stinson
- Running time: 30 minutes

Original release
- Network: CBC Television
- Release: 3 April – 24 April 1956

Crossfire is a Canadian current affairs television program that aired on CBC Television in April 1956, and which featured debate and panel show formats.

== Premise ==
This program was a mid-season replacement for Citizens' Forum during April 1956. In some episodes of Crossfire, a studio audience posed questions to several experts on a particular topic. Other episodes featured a debate for or against a given subject, resembling a court cross-examination, with a studio audience deciding the winning side of the argument.

- 3 April 1956 - debut
- 10 April 1956 - pre-empted for an NHL hockey playoffs broadcast
- 17 April 1956 - "Comic Books - Harmless or Dangerous?", under the audience question format
- 24 April 1956 - "Youth Wants to Know - How to be a Success" - an audience of youths poses questions to an expert panel

== Broadcast ==
This half-hour program was broadcast on Tuesdays at 10:00 p.m. (Eastern) from 3 to 24 April 1956.
