= Desperately Seeking Helen =

1998 documentary by Eisha Marjara

- Directed by: Eisha Marjara
- Written by: Eisha Marjara
- Produced by: Don Haig; Sally Bochner; David Wilson
- Narrated by: Eisha Marjara
- Cinematography: K. U. Mohanan; Jules De Niverville
- Edited by: Eisha Marjara
- Production company: National Film Board of Canada
- Release date: 1998
- Running time: 80 min
- Country: Canada
- Language: English

Desperately Seeking Helen is a 1998 documentary by Eisha Marjara, produced by the National Film Board of Canada.

It documents the life of the Bollywood star Helen and also discusses Marjara's process of self-discovery. Marjara liked Helen as a child, and Marjara stated "Helen is a conduit into my childhood — my relationship with my mother, my struggle with anorexia and the Air India disaster which took the lives of my mother and sister." Jerry Pinto, author of Helen: The Life and Times of an H-bomb, wrote that the film "is as much about Eisha Marjara's perception of Helen as it is about Helen." Desperately Seeking Helen uses Hindi music.

The film covers the complications in the relationship between Marjara and her mother, Devinder. Marjara had the perception that her mother was unable to balance the culture of Canada against that of India, and Devinder was more feminine and traditional compared to her daughter. The film also discusses the 1985 Air India Flight 182 bombing, which ultimately killed Devinder along with Seema, one of Marjara's sisters.

D.B. Jones, the author of "Brave New Film Board," wrote that the filmmaker "verges on self-pity and often seems self-absorbed, but she can also be brutally honest about herself." Sabeena Gadihoke, the author of "Secrets and Inner Voices: The Self and Subjectivity in Contemporary Indian Documentary," wrote that the "deeply personal" film "did not easily fit popular conceptions of documentary" since it had a "fictive structure in which the filmmaker staged her own body" as well as "reflexive use of humor" and "whimsy". Angela Failler argued that the film was what had been described as a "counter-memorial" of the Air India Flight 182 disaster.

== Background ==
The National Film Board selected Marjara to make a film on the Air India Flight 182 disaster in 1994. She did research by visiting Trois-Rivières and taking one trip to India. The title is a reference to the 1985 film Desperately Seeking Susan.

Marjara dedicated her film to Air India Flight 182 victims, including Davinder and Seema.

== Release and reception ==
The film's first screening in India was during the Mumbai International Film Festival (MIFF).

It was ranked as the "Theater Critic's Choice" in the Chicago Reader in 1999. Firdaus Ali of Rediff wrote that the film received "rave reviews". Gadihoke stated that in India the film received some criticism due to a perception that it was "self-absorbed"; Gadihoke argued that this was because the film used "strategies unfamiliar to documentary discourse in India at the time."

It earned a Special Mention from Planet Television at the 2000 Internationales Dokumentarfilmfestival München. At the 1999 Locarno Film Festival, it won the prestigious SRG SSR Award and the Silver Pardino - Leopards of Tomorrow award.
