= Faerie (novel) =

2016 novel by Eisha Marjara

- Cover of the 2016 Arsenal Pulp Press edition
- Author: Eisha Marjara
- Language: English
- Publisher: Arsenal Pulp Press
- Publication date: 2016

Faerie is a 2016 novel by Eisha Marjara, published by Arsenal Pulp Press. It was Marjara's first novel.

The story, set in Quebec, is about a Punjabi Canadian woman named Lila who recalls how anorexia developed in her childhood. Marjara herself faced anorexia in her adolescence. Marjara said that when she was young, there were scarce resources for people facing the issue, and she felt that the book could be a resource.

== Background ==
Marjara stated that she used her own history in writing the book, and she stated that anorexia had been perceived as a disease mainly affecting White people; she stated "I often wondered how I fit into that as a South Asian woman."

Marjara stated that she struggled in illustrating how the character's anorexia affected her body, and Marjara said she cried after writing segments portraying these issues.

According to Marjara, she cannot adequately write in her residence due to "too many distractions", so she prefers to write in locations away from her residence. Marjara often went to a food court at LaCité to write her novel. She stated that the "dull" location helped her concentrate on her task. She added that he had "a soft spot" for being together with people who she believed may have been unhoused, "people who don’t really feel they belong anywhere", who were at LaCité. Marjara characterized her writing of a novel about anorexia in a food court area as having "a definite irony".

Even though the author intended for the work to be a novel for adult readers, the publisher suggested that she market it in the young adult category.

== Plot ==
In the opening, Lila is in a psychiatric ward in an emaciated state, with her weight at 68 pounds. She harbors negative feelings towards her body. The next portion describes her history and how she became anorexic. The last portion describes more of her time in the psychiatric centre and what she ultimately does.

== Reception ==
M.A.C. Farrant of the Vancouver Sun wrote that the work is "a page turner" and that its writing has "an authentic feel" showing the main character's "rage" and "lived horror". Farrant argued that the final third portion of the book "is by far the strongest."

Shannon Ozirny of The Globe and Mail wrote that the book is "different and unabashedly more realistic than" most books about anorexia that are about teenagers, and that it is successful because it is "unbudging" from "going to such a gruelling, tough place".

Francine Cunningham, in Prism International, stated that the story was handled with "delicacy", and that she felt that it would help adolescents who faced anorexia.

Publishers Weekly gave a starred review and stated that the book has "lovely, flowing prose".

Kirkus Reviews argued that the work is important in telling a kind of story not previously told, and the magazine also praised "achingly poetic description" seen in the text. Kirkus argued that the story does not explain how certain events led anorexia to appear and that the framing of an adult recalling her childhood leads to "a surfeit of telling instead of showing".
