= This Hour Has Seven Days =

1960s Canadian television news magazine

- Genre: News magazine
- Created by: Patrick Watson; Douglas Leiterman
- Presented by: John Drainie; Laurier LaPierre; Patrick Watson; Dinah Christie
- Country of origin: Canada
- No. of episodes: 50

Production
- Running time: 60 minutes

Original release
- Network: CBC Television
- Release: October 4, 1964 – May 8, 1966

This Hour Has Seven Days is a CBC Television public affairs program that ran from 1964 to 1966, offering viewers in-depth analysis of the major social and political stories of the previous week.

The show, inspired by the BBC and NBC-TV satire series That Was the Week That Was, was created by Patrick Watson and Douglas Leiterman as an avenue for a more stimulating and boundary-pushing brand of television journalism. CBC executives believed the controversial show went beyond the limits of journalistic ethics and cancelled the show, leading to allegations of political interference.

The show set new standards of broadcast journalism in Canada and the United States, and many of its elements inspired the tabloid talk show genre in later decades.

== Overview ==
=== Hosts and contributors ===
This Hour Has Seven Days was initially hosted by John Drainie, Laurier LaPierre, and Carole Simpson (not to be confused with the now-retired ABC weekend news anchor of the same name); Simpson was soon replaced by Dinah Christie, and Watson himself replaced Drainie in the show's second season when Drainie (who died in 1966) was too ill to continue with the series.

It had a production staff of as many as 40 people, with a roster of producers responsible for separate segments.

Contributing personalities—known at various times as story editors, writers, directors, and producers—included Charles Backhouse, Donald Brittain, Cecily Burwash, Jim Carney, Roy Faibish, Beryl Fox, Allan King, Eric Koch, Heinz Kornagel, Sam Levene, Brian Nolan, Charles Oberdorf, Peter Pearson, Alexander Ross, Warner Troyer, Jack Webster, and Larry Zolf.

=== Content ===
This Hour Has Seven Days debuted on October 4, 1964, replacing the Cliff Solway-produced series Background. The show used a one-hour news format which combined satirical songs (performed by Simpson or Christie) and sketches with hard news interviews, reports, and documentaries. It also played a major role in bringing to public attention issues that had been suppressed or made taboo both in television and society as a whole.

Leiterman and Watson divided the show into different components, which varied in length and weight from broadcast to broadcast. As a review of the week's events, Seven Days would rely on film reports, linked with contexts and updates from the studio hosts.

Seven Days combined two types of public affairs television. Following the first type, the show employed the direct-cinema techniques of contemporary documentary filmmaking to cover issues of public interest in depth through hour-long film essays. Second, the show invigorated discussions with public policymakers, and helped establish television as a medium of public accountability. Interviews were drawn from the latter style of broadcast, and were labelled the "Hot Seat," proposed as a "tough encounter with a prominent guest who is hot in the news and prepared to be grilled." The "Small World" segment added the element of a studio audience for interview sessions.

The producers also planned to include background commentary by a range of Canadian and foreign broadcasters and writers; among them they proposed Alistair Cooke, James Reston, Blair Fraser, Rebecca West, Gérard Pelletier, James Wechsler, Simone de Beauvoir, and future Canadian Prime Minister Pierre Elliott Trudeau.

Once each month, Seven Days was replaced by Document (1964–66), a single-item documentary series, also produced by Leiterman and Watson. One documentary commissioned by Document, Fox's Vietnam War film The Mills of the Gods: Viet Nam, winner of Film of the Year at the Canadian Film Awards, became one of the most famous documentary films ever produced about the war, with editing by Don Haig. Earlier, the creative team of Fox and Haig, along with cameramen Richard Leiterman, John Foster and Grahame Woods, had gone to Mississippi to cover Freedom Summer following the murders of Chaney, Goodman, and Schwerner in August 1964. The result, known as Summer in Mississippi, won a Canadian Film Award for Best TV Information and was shown on Seven Days.

One of the most dramatic techniques was to ambush politicians and other figures at their homes or on their way to work and ask them difficult questions.

==== Select episodes and issues covered ====
As an example of the broad scope of each episode of Seven Days, consider the one that aired on the January 1, 1966 episode. It featured: Brian Nolan's interview with surrealist artist Salvador Dalí; Ken Lefolii's interview with reporter Richard Dudman, who was blamed for upsetting peace negotiations in North Vietnam; Robert Hoyt and Douglas Leiterman's interview with Washington columnist Max Freedman concerning President Lyndon Johnson's performance in the latest peace offensive; a comedy sketch by Stan Daniels and Barry Baldaro portraying future events in Rhodesia; a report on increased U.S. usage of chemical and biological weapons; a satirical report on Ronald Reagan's gubernatorial candidacy in California accompanied by film clips from some of his films; Dinah Christie's interview with actor Peter Ustinov, cartoonist Jules Feiffer, and writer Stan Freburg, regarding the 1960s; Larry Zolf's man-in-the-street interviews in London gauging public recognition of Canadian Prime Minister Lester B. Pearson; and finally a round table discussion with Finance Minister Mitchell Sharp who discusses public life, federal-provincial relations, foreign ownership and Canada's economic condition.

The show was also instrumental in news coverage of the Munsinger Affair, a 1966 sex scandal involving former federal Minister of Defence Pierre Sévigny. When Zolf showed up on Sévigny's doorstep in pursuit of the story, Sévigny whacked Zolf on the head with his cane.

Among other controversies inspired by the show, LaPierre was once shown wiping away tears on the air after a filmed interview pertaining to the Steven Truscott case, a report on the Miss Canada pageant was criticized as journalistic "poaching" because the rival CTV Television Network had exclusive coverage rights to the event, and an interview with members of the Ku Klux Klan was deliberately engineered to provoke an on-air reaction when a black civil rights activist was brought in, unannounced, to join the interview partway through.

== History ==
Created by Patrick Watson and Douglas Leiterman, This Hour Has Seven Days debuted on October 4, 1964, with a studio audience, unheard of for a news show at the time. The debut episode featured music by Dinah Christie, who sang original tunes based on the news of the week, and an interview with Marguerite Oswald, mother of Lee Harvey Oswald.

The show was initially hosted by John Drainie, Laurier LaPierre, and Carole Simpson (not to be confused with the now-retired ABC weekend news anchor of the same name); Simpson was soon replaced by Christie.

In the show's second season, Watson himself replaced Drainie as co-host, after the latter (who died in 1966) was too ill to continue with the series. This would leave Leiterman as the sole executive producer.

=== Cancellation ===
Concerned about the show's approach to the news, the CBC fired hosts Watson and LaPierre in April 1966, just before the end of the TV season; Lapierre's tears following the Truscott report, purportedly betraying a bias in his reporting, were cited as the pretext for the firing. This resulted in a public outcry for weeks as viewers organized demonstrations, wrote letters and made angry phone calls, CBC staff threatened to resign, newspaper editorials fulminated about political interference in the decision, and politicians demanded a parliamentary inquiry.

A parliamentary committee hearing was convened, and Prime Minister Lester Pearson appointed Vancouver Sun publisher Stu Keate as a special investigator. CBC president Alphonse Ouimet told the committee that CBC management had been battling the show's producers for two years, and that the show had consistently ignored CBC policies.

Following two weeks of mediation, Keate said it was clear that there had been "mistakes made on both sides" and recommended that the CBC board of directors do a better job of explaining to the public its decision to fire Watson and LaPierre. CBC directors immediately reaffirmed the firing of Watson and LaPierre, while admitting that the way they were fired had been a mistake.

The dispute heated up again in July, leading producer Douglas Leiterman to halt work on a new season of programs. Leiterman said he was told by CBC that his contract for the show would only be renewed if he signed a pledge to behave himself, and that he believed that Bud Walker—the CBC vice-president who had fired Watson and LaPierre—had been given a promotion to oversee all CBC English programming. The CBC denied that Walker had been promoted, fired Leiterman and cancelled the show.

== Legacy ==
Seven Days set new standards of broadcast journalism in Canada and the United States. Shortly after it ended, the rival CTV Television Network launched a similar program called W5, which aired until 2024 (Watson contributed to this series on occasion). 60 Minutes and The Fifth Estate were two other shows that debuted within fewer than 10 years of Seven Days' cancellation. It later also inspired the Canadian sketch comedy series This Hour Has 22 Minutes, which took both its name and a comedic variation on Seven Days-style ambush interviews from the earlier show.

Watson continued to produce programming for the CBC, including the 1988 documentary series The Struggle for Democracy. He also produces and narrates The Heritage Minutes, which are made for the Historica Foundation and given to all broadcasters who want them (receiving some 50,000 showings per year across Canada). In 1989, he was named chairman of the CBC, a position he held until 1994.

LaPierre, who also continued to produce CBC programming and authored a number of books on Canadian history, was named to the Senate in 2001. He died in Ottawa in December 2012.

Christie continued to work as a singer and comedic actress.

In 2001, the CBC reaired a number of old episodes of Seven Days as a summer series.

In 2002, the Audio-Visual Preservation Trust of Canada honoured This Hour Has Seven Days as a MasterWorks recipient.

In 2014, the October 24, 1965 episode of the series was screened at the Canadian International Television Festival in Toronto. This episode featured the Ku Klux Klan segment noted above, as well as an invitation to political party leaders to appear on the show as part of the 1965 election campaign, a report on the shooting death of a policeman in Sudbury, an election "poll" of homeless men, interviews with Bob Guccione and Orson Welles, a feature profile on boxer George Chuvalo, and a comedic sketch mocking Prime Minister Lester Pearson and British Prime Minister Harold Wilson's negotiations to have the Canadian government purchase military aircraft from the United Kingdom.
