= Children of Jerusalem =

1990s documentary series by Beverly Shaffer

- Children of Jerusalem: Yehuda
- Directed by: Beverly Shaffer
- Produced by: Beverly Shaffer; Colin Neale; Don Haig (Yehuda, Ibrahim, Gesho)
- Narrated by: Maureen Hebert (Asya)
- Cinematography: Kent Nason
- Edited by: Sidonie Kerr; Rita Roy; Tony Reed (sound); Danuta Klis (sound); Don Ayer (sound)
- Music by: Chris Crilly (Gesho, Ibrahim, Asya); Fran Avni (Tamar); Kathryn Moses (Neveen); Louis Hone (Asya); Ibrahim Naddaf (Yacoub); Stephen Glass (Yehuda)
- Running time: 23-29 minutes
- Languages: English; Hebrew

Children of Jerusalem is a series of seven documentary films directed by Beverly Shaffer for the National Film Board of Canada between 1991 and 1996. The series illustrates life in Jerusalem from the points of view of children of various cultural, social and religious backgrounds.

== Tamar (1991) ==
This film follows 10-year-old Tamar as she recounts the experiences of her daily life in Jerusalem. She practices her tuba and attends school, shops at the local market, and attends a religious youth camp. She welcomes cousins who have emigrated from Russia, and expresses her desire for peace between Jews and Arabs.

== Neveen (1992) ==
Neveen is a 12-year-old Palestinian girl who lives in the Shuafat refugee camp on the outskirts of Jerusalem. Neveen gives us a tour of her typical day: helping her mother with chores, attending school, learning English with her aunt. Throughout, Neveen discusses her family history and her faith; her classmates engage in a lively discussion about the history of Israeli-Palestinian relations and what they think the future holds for all people in the region.

== Asya (1992) ==
Asya profiles 11-year-old Russian immigrant Asya as she and her family get accustomed to life in Jerusalem. From issues of cultural, political and religious diversity to the simple act of making new friends, this portrait of Asya is indicative of life for many ethnic Jewish immigrants to Jerusalem.

== Yacoub (1992) ==
This is a portrait of 9-year-old Yacoub, a Palestinian who lives in the Christian Quarter of Jerusalem. He studies English and French at school, and enjoys shopping at outdoor markets and helping at his uncle's falafel shop. He'd like to be free to go out and play with his friends without his parents worrying about his safety. As we accompany him in his daily activities, we see how his life is affected by the Israeli–Palestinian conflict.

== Yehuda (1994) ==
Yehuda focuses on Israel and Jerusalem from the point of view of 10 year-old Yehuda Witt, a Hasidic boy who is preparing to observe the religious holiday of Sukkot. At one point, Yehuda explains that his name stands for 'lion', which he sees as powerful and fearless. He has a strong desire to be a moral Jew, a sincere admiration of his beliefs, and complete, unconditional confidence in his religion. His life is centred on religion, and he is keenly interested in his Polish and Russian ancestors. Not many children have to be anxious about being teased for possessing side curls, but Yehuda faces many of the same issues as other boys of his age.

== Ibrahim (1996) ==
Ibrahim is an 11-year-old Palestinian boy living in East Jerusalem. We follow him on his way home from school as he passes through several distinct neighbourhoods—Orthodox Jewish, Secular Jewish and an Arab neighbourhood where Palestinians wear traditional dress. Ibrahim’s life blends the modern with the traditional. He plays soccer and Nintendo and is at home with the older ways of his grandfather in Galilee and his nanny in the Old City of Jerusalem.

== Gesho (1996) ==
Gesho is a 13 year-old Ethiopian boy who was one of 14,000 refugees to flee the warring African nation in hopes of finding a better life in Israel. As he shares his nostalgia for the garden he left back in Ethiopia and his determination to succeed as a professional soccer player in Israel, his story of assimilation comments on Israel's Ethiopian population at large. Gesho has seen war, danger and poverty, and was separated from his family for seven years, but he accepts it all with grace. He is still excited by the luxuries of electricity and running water in his family's trailer, and he enjoys school, which he had to leave after the sixth grade to help his father on the family farm. Gesho's inner strength and determination have contributed to his ranking as the number two player on his soccer team; he knows how to challenge himself to improve and has little doubt that he will succeed.
