= Summer in Mississippi =

- Written by: Beryl Fox
- Directed by: Beryl Fox
- Country of origin: Canada
- Original language: English

Production
- Executive producer: Douglas Leiterman
- Producer: Beryl Fox
- Cinematography: Richard Leiterman; John Foster; Grahame Woods
- Editor: Don Haig
- Running time: 27 minutes
- Production company: Canadian Broadcasting Corporation

Original release
- Network: Canadian Broadcasting Corporation
- Release: 1965

Summer in Mississippi is a 1965 Canadian cinéma-vérité documentary short from Beryl Fox, produced by the Canadian Broadcasting Corporation and first shown on This Hour Has Seven Days. It won the award for Best Film, TV Information, at the 17th Canadian Film Awards.

== Synopsis ==
Director Beryl Fox traveled to Mississippi after the bodies of the three civil rights workers working for the Congress of Racial Equality and Freedom Summer project were found on August 4, 1964. Andrew Goodman, James Chaney and Michael Schwerner were killed while attempting to register black Americans in Mississippi to vote; their deaths are now known as the Mississippi Burning Murders.

Fox's objective was not to follow the murder trail, but to examine the difficulties faced by new student volunteers heading to Mississippi and the region's frenzied social climate. The film, characteristic of the developing CBC documentary style of the period, paints a vivid picture of a time when the summer heat reflected the inflamed emotions of an entire state.

== Legacy ==
After watching Summer in Mississippi, Canadian filmmaker David Ridgen was inspired to make Return to Mississippi (2004), also for the CBC. During its production, he learned of the 1964 Ku Klux Klan murders of two 19-year-old African-American men, Henry Hezekiah Dee and Charles Eddie Moore. This led him to produce his next film, Mississippi Cold Case, a documentary so compelling it led Mississippi state officials to re-open their investigation into the case, which resulted in Klansman James Ford Seale being convicted of conspiracy and kidnapping and handed three concurrent life sentences.

== See also ==
- Civil rights movement in popular culture
