= Syrinx (band) =

Canadian electronic music group

- Origin: Canada
- Genres: Electronic; rock; progressive
- Years active: 1970–1972
- Past members: John Mills-Cockell; Alan Wells; Doug Pringle

Syrinx was a Canadian electronic music group active from 1970 to 1972. Propelled by the compositions of keyboardist John Mills-Cockell and backed by saxophonist Doug Pringle and percussionist Alan Wells, the group broke musical ground with their innovative use of the Moog synthesizer and their world music inspirations. Their song "Tillicum" received national attention as the theme music for the television series Here Come the Seventies.

== Career ==
Syrinx formed in 1970, when composer and multi-instrumentalist Mills-Cockell joined forces with percussionist Alan Wells and saxophonist Doug Pringle. A progressive music trio whose body of work incorporated elements of electronica, classical and world music, and psychedelic rock, Syrinx initially played the Toronto coffee-house circuit. After a time, Canadian music executive and talent manager Bernie Finkelstein signed the trio to his newly created True North Records.

=== Debut Album ===
Syrinx released its first (eponymous) album in 1970. In its wake, the group found itself newly in demand from a variety of quarters: Syrinx opened for Miles Davis on his Bitches Brew tour, and played bills with Ravi Shankar.

In addition, the first release attracted the attention of executives from CTV, which commissioned a theme song for its forward-looking television series Here Come the Seventies. This commission resulted in Mills-Cockell composing Tillicum, which was later released as a single and was included on Syrinx’s second album.

The first album also resulted in a 1971 commission, from the respected Toronto Repertory Orchestra under the direction of Milton Barnes, of Stringspace, which Mills-Cockell composed for Syrinx, the TRO, and additional percussion. Stringspace is a 26-minute composition in four movements: Syren, December Angel, Ibisitx, and Field Hymn (Epilogue). Stringspace was performed live and broadcast on the Canadian Broadcasting Corporation’s program Music to See in 1971.

=== Long Lost Relatives ===
Riding the wave of notice and critical approval that arose from their first album, Syrinx returned to the studio in late 1970 to record a second album. However, after weeks of recording, a fire destroyed the studio, the group’s instruments - including Mills-Cockell’s Moog Mark II - and the master tapes of the recordings for their new album.

Undeterred, and with fundraising support from the Toronto musical community, the group purchased new instruments and pressed on to record the album.

Long Lost Relatives was issued in 1971 on Finkelstein’s True North label. The album included Mills-Cockell’s Tillicum and the four Stringspace pieces (which, owing to the space restrictions of the LP medium, spanned both sides of the LP), rounded out by three additional Mills-Cockell compositions: Tumblers to the Vault, Better Deaf and Dumb from the First, and Aurora Spinray. Tillicum was also released as a single, and peaked at #38 on the Canadian charts in 1971.

== Dissolution and reissues ==
The group disbanded in 1972 as Mills-Cockell and the other members went on to pursue other projects.

Mills-Cockell remains active in composition for stage, television, film, and radio. Pringle is a producer and director of digital media, television and music. Wells died in 2010 of COPD.

On 24 August 2016, RVNG Intl. announced the release of Tumblers from the Vault, a remastered collection including the entire released repertoire of Syrinx, together with previously unreleased tracks, including the audio recording of the CBC Music to See performance of Stringspace. Tumblers from the Vault was offered for pre-order on 24 August 2016, and was released on 14 October 2016.

Surviving members reunited in 2017 for a performance at Moogfest.

== Critical reception ==
Reviews from Syrinx's active years in the early '70s are difficult to come by.

Modern commentators are almost universally positive, praising Mills-Cockell's compositions, the musicianship of the three principals, and the pioneering nature of the music.

== Members ==
- John Mills-Cockell - keyboards
- Doug Pringle - saxophones
- Malcolm Tomlinson - drums and voice (active later in the band's existence)
- Allan Wells - percussion (deceased 3 November 2010)

== Discography ==
- 1970: Syrinx (True North) #59 Canada
- 1971: Long Lost Relatives (True North) #51 Canada
- 1971: "Tillicum" (single) (True North) #38 Canada, #8 Canada MOR chart
- 2016: Tumblers From The Vault (RVNG Intl)

The song "Journey Tree" from Syrinx was a 'recommended' sub-Top 20 on the MAPL GMP chart for two weeks, November 7 and 14, 1970.
