= Citizens' Forum (TV program) =

Canadian current affairs television program

- Genre: Current affairs
- Presented by: Gordon Hawkins
- Country of origin: Canada
- Original language: English
- No. of seasons: 7

Production
- Running time: 30 minutes

Original release
- Network: CBC Television
- Release: 25 October 1955 – 29 April 1962

Related
- The Sixties

Citizens' Forum is a Canadian current affairs television program that aired on CBC Television from 1955 to 1962.

== Premise ==
Episodes in the first season of Citizens' Forum concerned social topics such as the prison system, whether Canada could be considered a Christian nation, unemployment and various current news stories. A panel conversation was followed by discussion from a studio audience. A subject could be presented for three weeks, followed by feedback from viewers in a follow-up "What People Say" episode.

In the second season (1956–1957), the program aired on Sunday afternoons instead of prime time and the episodes no longer adhered to a strict panel and audience format. The initial four episodes of that season featured debates on a particular resolution in each episode. Another set of episodes, named "You Be The Critic", allowed viewers to mail in their views on particular topics. "Take It From Here" was another set of programs which presented a subject as a short drama followed by a discussion. During the program's run, it used telephone call-in segments and sometimes originated in different Canadian cities.

Citizens' Forum was a co-production between the CBC and the Canadian Association for Adult Education (CAAE), adapted from a similar program which was broadcast on CBC Radio since 1943. After this program ended in April 1962, the next CBC/CAAE co-production was The Sixties (1963–1966).

Les idées en marche on Radio-Canada was a more successful French-language version of Citizens' Forum. Like the English program, it was also a co-production with an educational body.

== Broadcast ==
This half-hour program was broadcast as follows (times in North American Eastern):

Day	Time	Season run	
Tuesdays	10:00 p.m.	25 October 1955	27 March 1956
Sundays	3:00 p.m.	28 October 1956	31 March 1957
Sundays	3:00 p.m.	27 October 1957	30 March 1958
Sundays	3:00 p.m.	26 October 1958	29 March 1959
Sundays	3:00 p.m.	25 October 1959	3 April 1960
Sundays	4:30 p.m.	5 November 1961	14 November 1961
Sundays	5:00 p.m.	21 November 1961	29 April 1962
