= Naïm Kattan =

Canadian writer (1928–2021)

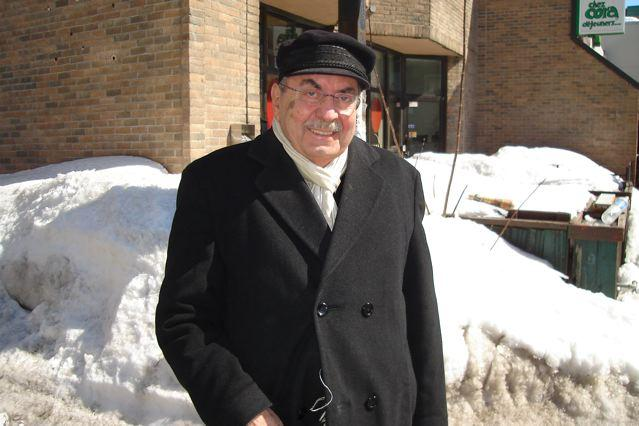
- Born: August 26, 1928; Baghdad, Iraq
- Died: July 2, 2021 (aged 92); Paris, France
- Education: University of Baghdad, University of Paris
- Writing career
- Language: French
- Notable works: Farewell, Babylon

Naïm Kattan, OC CQ FRSC (Hebrew: נָעִים קָטָן, Arabic: نعيم قطان; August 26, 1928 – July 2, 2021) was a Canadian novelist, essayist and critic of Iraqi Jewish origin. He was the author of more than 30 books, translated into several languages.

== Biography ==
Kattan spent the first years of his life growing up in Jewish Baghdad, and studied at the University of Baghdad from 1945 until 1947. Those years of his life are explored throughout his novel Farewell, Babylon. First published in French as Adieu, Babylone in 1975, his novel was translated by Sheila Fischman and published in English in 1976. The early years of Kattan's life were complicated. Kattan recalls in Farewell, Babylon the experiences of growing up in a community torn between Jewish and Arab nationalisms, the horrors of the 1941 Farhud, and anti-Semitism, but also Jewish successes in the cosmopolitan Arab city.

In 1947, Kattan was awarded a scholarship from the government of France, and left Iraq to study literature at the Sorbonne in Paris. Kattan emigrated to Montreal in 1954. In partnership with the Canadian Jewish Congress, Naim Kattan founded Le Cercle Juif, a publication dedicated to building cultural ties between Jewish and French Canada in the 1950, which was the first non-Catholic French-language periodical published in Montreal. Kattan went on to write a literary column in Le Devoir, and for close to 25 years he headed the writing and publishing division of the Canada Council for the Arts Writing and Publication program. Kattan was also an Associate Professor in the Department of Literary Studies at the Université du Québec à Montréal.

== Works ==
=== Farewell, Babylon ===
Farewell, Babylon is a fictionalized memoir of Kattan's early years growing up in Jewish Baghdad. A story of life, sorrow, and coming of age, Farewell, Babylon is at once a history lesson and an homage to Jewish Baghdad. First published in French in 1975 as, Adieu, Babylone, the novel was translated by Sheila Fischman and published in English in 2005. It is the first of a trilogy that follows protagonist Meir as he moves from Iraq, to France and finally to Canada, a personal and professional trajectory that mirrors the author's own. The work narrates a series of scenes, not necessarily in chronological order, of the protagonist's adolescence. Farewell, Babylon and Kattan himself are little known outside academic circles. However, the work is a critical read for anyone interested in the history, culture and politics of modern Iraq. While Farewell, Babylon could be considered historical literature, the main theme of the novel is coming- of-age. Subsequent themes are identity, existence and love of literature.

=== Cities of Birth ===
Naim Kattan wrote Cities of Birth, a short story about places. The story is a celebration of the cities that have enriched Kattan's life. This short story is essential to understanding Kattan's body of work through the years, especially his relation to identity and place as themes in his writings. The story is about Paris, Berlin, Montreal, and Istanbul. However, the essence of the story is about the experiences Kattan had in each place and his Jewish heritage.

== Legacy ==
Kattan has been provided many titles: author and critic; academic; pluralist; Arab; Jew; Canadian and Francophone. He famously never accepted or rejected any one of these titles. Instead, Kattan has embraced the theme of identity and concept of rebirth. Kattan has said that he was born three times: first in Baghdad, then in Paris and a third birth in Montréal (reference).

In 2013, the Canadian director Joe Balass directed a documentary titled La longueur de l'alphabet avec Naïm Kattan about Kattan's literary legacy.

=== Honours ===
- In 1983 he was made an Officer of the Order of Canada.
- In 1990 he was made a Knight of the National Order of Quebec.
- In 2002 he was made a Chevalier of the Légion d'honneur, for his lifelong contribution to international francophone culture.
- In 2004 he received the Prix Athanase-David.
- In 2004 he received an honoris causa Ph.D. from the University of Novi Sad in Serbia
- In 2006 he received an honorary degree from Concordia University in Montreal, Quebec Canada.

== Bibliography ==
- 1975: Adieu, Babylone: Mémoires d'un juif d'Irak
- 1977: Les Fruits arrachés
- 1983: La Fiancée promise
- 1989: La Fortune du passager
- 1990: Le Père
- 1991: Farida
- 1997: La Célébration
- 1999: L'Amour reconnu
- 1999: Le Silence des adieux
- 2000: L'Anniversaire
- 2003: Le Gardien de mon frère
- 2005: Je regarde les femmes
- 2006: Châteaux en Espagne
- 2009: Le Veilleur
- 2011: Le long retour
