= Calorie (film) =

2025 Canadian drama film

- Directed by: Eisha Marjara
- Written by: Eisha Marjara
- Produced by: Joe Balass
- Starring: Ellora Patnaik; Anupam Kher; Dolly Ahluwalia
- Cinematography: Marc Simpson-Threlford; Christophe Dalpé
- Edited by: Paul Chotel
- Music by: Gaëtan Gravel
- Production company: Compass Productions
- Distributed by: Filmoption International
- Release date: September 21, 2025 (CIFF)
- Running time: 107 minutes
- Country: Canada
- Languages: English; Punjabi

Calorie is a Canadian drama film, directed by Eisha Marjara and released in 2025. The film stars Ellora Patnaik as Monika, the single mother of a Sikh Canadian family who sends her rebellious teenaged daughters Alia (Shanaya Dhillon-Birmhan) and Simi (Ashley Ganger) on a trip to India to visit family and reconnect with their Punjabi heritage. Monika had also been a rebellious teenager, and as an adult had always shielded a family secret from her daughters, which they discover during their trip; their grandmother, Monika's mother, had been killed in the bombing of Air India Flight 182, which has stilted Monika's own ability to have proper relationships with those around her.

The cast also includes Anupam Kher and Dolly Ahluwalia as Mohan and Gurdeep, the great-uncle and great-aunt who host the girls on the trip, as well as Sana Syed, Puja Uppal, Usha Uppal and Peter Miller in supporting roles.

== Production ==
Production on the film began in fall 2022 in Montreal, with further shooting in India later in the fall and winter.

== Distribution ==
The film premiered at the Calgary International Film Festival on September 21, 2025, and was screened in November at the 56th International Film Festival of India, prior to its commercial release on November 28.

== Critical response ==
Elizabeth Mulloy of That Shelf wrote that "for all of its shortcomings, Calorie remains quietly compelling. Its familiar contours, its deeply personal undercurrents, and its universal longing for connection manage to cut through the film’s flaws. While the script is undercooked and its characters are underwritten, there is an undeniable warmth in the way these lives brush up against each other. That warmth, paired with Marjar’s earnest direction, gives the film enough emotional pull to make it a worthwhile journey."
