= Here Come the 70s =

Canadian documentary television series

- Also known as: Towards the Year 2000
- Genre: Documentary
- Theme music composer: John Mills-Cockell
- Opening theme: "Tillicum"
- Country of origin: Canada
- Original language: English
- No. of seasons: 3

Production
- Producers: Philip S. Hobel; Douglas Leiterman

Original release
- Network: CTV
- Release: 17 September 1970 – 1973

Related
- The Fabulous Sixties; Target: The Impossible

Here Come the 70s, also rendered as Here Come the Seventies, is a Canadian documentary television series that originally aired on CTV from 1970 to 1973. It was sold internationally under the title Towards the Year 2000 and in French as Vers l'an 2000.

The programs were produced by Philip S. Hobel and Douglas J. Leiterman, who previously produced The Fabulous Sixties series for CTV. "Communications – The Wired World" was the first episode to air, on 17 September 1970.

The series had a unique opening scene featuring a nude blonde girl, seen from behind, walking from the beach into the surf until she disappears under the surface to swim underwater. This opening title had various clips of different thought provoking scenes superimposed over the model, of people and new technologies of the time, so as to distract from the nudity which was provocative for early 1970s Canadian television.

Toronto electronic music group Syrinx produced the program's theme song, "Tillicum", which became a minor radio hit in Canada, hitting number 38 on the Canadian charts on 5 June 1971.

== Episodes ==
No.	Title	Original release date
1	"Communications: The Wired World"	17 September 1970
2	"Fashion in the 70s"	24 September 1970
3	"Genetics: Man The Creator"	1 October 1970
4	"Space: Lab in the Sky"	15 October 1970
5	"Youth: The Search for Relevance"	22 October 1970
6	"Geopolitics: Shape of Things to Come"	29 October 1970
7	"Cities: Living in a Machine"	5 November 1970
8	"Penology: The Keeper of the Keys"	12 November 1970
9	"Medicine: Living To Be A Hundred"	19 November 1970
10	"Mass Transit: Up, Up and Away"	26 November 1970
11	"Art in the Seventies: Search For Inner Self"	3 December 1970
12	"Education: No More Teachers, No More Books"	10 December 1970
13	"Air Pollution: Sweetening the Air"	17 December 1970
14	"Technology: Catastrophe or Commitment?"	14 January 1971
15	"Crime: Dye Guns, Lasers, Justice?"	21 January 1971
16	"Brother, Can You Spare $1,000,000,000?"	28 January 1971
17	"Arctic: The Last Chance"	4 February 1971
18	"The Biochemedical Revolution: Moods of the Future"	11 February 1971
19	"Woman: The Hand That Cradles the Rock"	18 February 1971
20	"Water: The Effluent Society"	25 February 1971
21	"Sports: The Programmed Gladiators"	4 March 1971
22	"Race Relations: Getting It Together"	11 March 1971
23	"Sex: Breaking Down the Barriers"	18 March 1971
24	"Leisure: Living With the Twenty Hour Week"	25 March 1971
25	"Mental Health: New Frontiers of Sanity"	1 April 1971
26	"Let The Seller Beware"	15 April 1971

== Radio show ==
Here Come the Seventies was also the name of a CBC Radio sketch comedy show that aired in 1982 and 1983 as part of Variety Tonight. The show's title was an ironic reference to the earlier documentary series. While it often focused on topical satire, it also featured surreal and character-based confrontational humour. The show was produced and written by David Cole and Hugh Graham and starred Don Dickenson, Frank Daley, and Kathy Gallant.
