= An Unfinished Journey (film) =

2024 Canadian documentary film

- Directed by: Aeyliya Husain; Amie Williams
- Written by: Aeyliya Husain
- Produced by: Rea Apostolides; Ruth Ann Harnisch; Nadine Pequeneza; Charlotte Uzu
- Starring: Homaira Ayubi; Zefnoon Safai; Nargis Nehan; Nilofar Moradi
- Cinematography: Mrinal Desai; Ramzi Maroof
- Edited by: Jordan Kawai
- Music by: Thibault Quillet
- Production companies: Hitplay Productions; Les Films d'Ici; Canadian Broadcasting Corporation
- Distributed by: Game Theory Films
- Release date: March 12, 2024 (FIFDH)
- Running time: 75 minutes
- Countries: Canada; France
- Languages: English; Dari; Pashtu

An Unfinished Journey is a 2024 Canadian-French documentary film, directed by Aeyliya Husain and Amie Williams. The film centres on four women from Afghanistan — former politicians Homaira Ayubi, Zefnoon Safai and Nargis Nehan, and journalist Nilofar Moradi — who have resettled in Canada as refugees but continue to advocate for the protection of women's rights in Afghanistan.

== Distribution ==
The film premiered in March 2024 at the International Film Festival and Forum on Human Rights, and had its Canadian premiere at the 2024 Hot Docs Canadian International Documentary Festival.

It had limited commercial distribution in Canadian theatres in September 2024, and was broadcast by CBC Television on October 16 as an episode of The Passionate Eye.

== Awards ==
It was a nominee for the DGC Allan King Award for Best Documentary Film at the 2024 Directors Guild of Canada awards, and was nominated for the Donald Brittain Award at the 13th Canadian Screen Awards in 2025.
