= Cliff Solway =

Canadian producer and director

- Born: Clifford Solway; November 6, 1926; Toronto, Ontario
- Died: August 3, 2009 (aged 82)
- Occupations: Producer, Director

Clifford "Cliff" Solway (November 6, 1926 – August 3, 2009) was a Canadian producer and director for public affairs programming for 57 years on CBC Television.

== Biography ==
Solway was born in Toronto, Ontario, and attended college at Ryerson Polytechnical Institute there. After graduating, he began work with CBC at the suggestion of a friend; he applied and was hired into the lightning department and eventually rose to the level of producer. He produced such shows as Fighting Words and Background.

While working in Toronto, he met lifelong friend Antoinette Bower, who worked at the studio. Though they eventually tried to live together in Bower's home city, Los Angeles, for a time, they did not spend enough time together for the relationship to be viable, as Solway had to spend too much time in Toronto. Although Bower married in 1963, they remained close friends for Solway's entire life. After his death, Bower was quoted as saying, "We were soulmates for life. We loved each other."

Later in his life, Solway lived in New York City, where he worked as a freelance writer for newspapers – including Saturday Night, Village Voice and the New Statesman – and as a documentary producer.

== Works ==
- Books Alive (TV series)
- The Business of Books (TV Series)
- Crossfire (TV series)
- Profile (TV series)
- Fighting Words (TV series)
- Background (TV series)
- The Business of Books (TV series)
- Explorations (TV series)
- Provincial Affairs (TV series)
- Winter Conference (1956) (TV series)
- The Way It Is (TV series, director)
- The Times They Are A-Changin' (TV movie)
- Mr. Kennedy, Mr. Reagan and The Big, Beautiful, Beleaguered American Dream (documentary)
- A Long View Of Canadian History (documentary)
- The Lost Apple (documentary, short), 1962, a US Information Agency production, narrated by Carlos Montalban
- The Gay Life (documentary, short)
- The Burglars (documentary, short)
- "Turning History Upside Down" (article)
- "Film, Television, and Reality" (article)
