= John Mills-Cockell =

- John Mills-Cockell

Background information
- Born: John Mills-Cockell; 19 May 1943 (age 83); Toronto, Ontario, Canada
- Genres: Electronic, rock, film and television scores, opera, theatre
- Occupation: Composer
- Instrument: Multiple
- Years active: 1963–present
- Labels: True North, Alga Marghen, RVNG Intl.
- Website: johnmillscockell.ca

John Mills-Cockell (born 19 May 1943) is a Canadian composer and multi-instrumentalist, perhaps best known for his ground-breaking work with progressive / avant garde Canadian groups Intersystems and Syrinx, and for his numerous works for radio, television, film, ballet, and stage.

Mills-Cockell was one of the earliest adopters of the Moog synthesizer, and is generally regarded as a pioneer in the field of electronic music.

== Early life ==
Mills-Cockell was born in Toronto, Ontario. His mother died when he was six months old. His father, whose work often required him to spend extended time overseas, found it necessary to place Mills-Cockell in an orphanage for a time shortly thereafter. Eventually, Mills-Cockell's father remarried and the family was reunited. Mills-Cockell has two younger brothers.

Mills-Cockell was introduced to music at the age of 5, when his father, a devoted amateur musician and choir singer, encouraged him to join a church choir. At the age of fifteen, he heard his first piece of electronic music and found himself "hooked."

== Formal musical education ==
Mills-Cockell studied music at the University of Toronto from 1963 to 1967.

He studied piano under John Coveart, and composition under Dr. Samuel Dolin, at the Royal Conservatory of Music in Toronto from 1964 to 1968, where he also taught electronic music.

He undertook graduate studies under Gustav Ciamaga at the University of Toronto's Electronic Music Studio in 1967 and 1968.

== Intersystems ==
In Toronto in the fall of 1967, Mills-Cockell joined forces with light sculptor Michael Hayden, poet Blake Parker, and architect Dik Zander to form Intersystems, an arts collective and multimedia performance group. Intersystems' multimedia presentations were a classification-defying juxtaposition of Mills-Cockell's music, Hayden's light shows, Parker's spoken-word poetry readings, with Zander's engineering skills underlying the construction of the presentations.

Intersystems performed extensively in Canada and the US, including in Toronto, Montreal, Vancouver, New York City, Pittsburgh, and, at the invitation of Buckminster Fuller, Southern Illinois University in Carbondale, Illinois.

Intersystems released three LP recordings: Number One Intersystems (1967), Peachy (1968), and Free Psychedelic Poster Inside (1968). These original releases have become collector's items and are exceedingly difficult to find.

In late 2015, all three Intersystems albums were remastered and reissued, together with a 132-page bound booklet containing photos, essays, and reproductions of vintage press coverage, on Italian label Alga Marghen, to widespread acclaim.

The band made a surprise comeback in March 2021, with the announcement of their 4th album, titled #4. The album is set to release on 31 April of the same year.

== Syrinx ==
After the dissolution of Intersystems in 1968, Mills-Cockell continued to compose, working with a number of other established musicians, including Anne Murray, Bruce Cockburn, and Murray McLauchlan.

His next major visible milestone came in 1970, when, together with percussionist Alan Wells and saxophonist Doug Pringle, Mills-Cockell formed Syrinx, a progressive music trio whose body of work incorporated elements of electronica, classical and world music, and psychedelic rock. Syrinx played the Toronto coffee-house circuit. After a time, Canadian music executive and talent manager Bernie Finkelstein signed the trio to his newly created True North Records.

=== 1970: First album and growing notice ===
Syrinx released its first (eponymous) album in 1970.

The album garnered an enthusiastic response from critics, and in its wake, the group found itself newly in demand from a variety of quarters.

Syrinx opened for jazz legend Miles Davis on his Bitches Brew tour, and played bills with Ravi Shankar.

In addition, the first release attracted the attention of executives from CTV, which commissioned a theme song for its forward-looking television series Here Come the Seventies. This commission resulted in Mills-Cockell composing Tillicum, which was later released as a single and was included on Syrinx's second album.

The first album also resulted in a 1971 commission, from the respected Toronto Repertory Orchestra, of Stringspace, which Mills-Cockell composed for Syrinx, the TRO, and additional percussion. Stringspace is a 26-minute composition in four movements: December Angel, Syren, Ibisitx, and Field Hymn (Epilogue). Stringspace was performed live by Syrinx and the TRO, conducted by Milton Barnes, and broadcast on the Canadian Broadcasting Corporation's program Music to See in 1971.

=== 1971: Long Lost Relatives ===
Riding the wave of notice and critical approval that arose from their first album, Syrinx returned to the studio in late 1970 to record a second album. However, after weeks of recording, a fire destroyed the studio, the group's instruments – including Mills-Cockell's Moog Mark II – and the master tapes of the recordings for their new album.

Undeterred, and with fundraising support from the Toronto musical community, the group purchased new instruments and pressed on to record the album.

Long Lost Relatives was issued in 1971 on Finkelstein's True North label. The album included Mills-Cockell's Tillicum and the four Stringspace pieces (which, owing to the space restrictions of the LP medium, spanned both sides of the LP), rounded out by three additional Mills-Cockell compositions: Tumblers to the Vault, Better Deaf and Dumb from the First, and Aurora Spinray. Tillicum was also released as a single, and peaked at #38 on the Canadian charts in 1971.

The group disbanded in 1972 as Mills-Cockell, Wells, and Pringle went on to pursue other projects.

=== 2016: Tumblers from the Vault (1970–1972) ===
On 24 August 2016, RVNG Intl. announced the release of Tumblers from the Vault, a remastered collection including Syrinx's entire released repertoire, together with some previously unreleased tracks, including the audio recording of the CBC Music to See performance of Stringspace. Tumblers from the Vault has been released on 14 October 2016.

== Solo albums and collaborations ==
In the years following the 1972 break-up of Syrinx, Mills-Cockell released a number of solo efforts, including Heartbeat (True North, 1973), A Third Testament (True North, 1974), Gateway (Anubis, 1977), and Do Your Hear the Rushing River? (1995). He also released a cassette of Stella in Black and White, a collaboration with poet Blake Parker, in 1994.

In 2004, Mills-Cockell released on CD his seven-movement Concerto of Deliverance, an "extended tone poem with words," with libretto by Blake Parker.

== Theatre and dance ==
Mills-Cockell has been active throughout his career in musicals, and has composed over 100 scores for plays in theatres across Canada. Many of his works not specifically created for dance have been adapted by dance troupes, including Belong, by the Royal Winnipeg Ballet, Ariel Ribbon, by the Anna Wyman Dance Theatre, and Journey Tree and Chant for Your Dragon King by the National Ballet of Canada.

He is currently working on bringing Savitri and Sam, a full-length opera he composed, with libretto by Ken Gass, to the stage.

He is also working on his latest opera, Kid Catastrophe, with librettist France Ducasse.

== Film, television and radio ==
Mills-Cockell has composed scores for such feature films as The Clown Murders (1976), Deadly Harvest (1977), Terror Train (1980), Humongous (1982), and Striker's Mountain (1985).

He has also been active as a composer for short film and television, and has created original scores for such productions as Packing Up, Reverse, The Italians, Stationary Ark, and The Little Vampire.

He has scored dozens of radio productions for the CBC.

== Association with Robert Moog ==
During his tenure with Intersystems, Mills-Cockell was one of the first artists to adopt the Moog Modular synthesizer as a performance musical instrument, meeting several times with Robert Moog before finally purchasing an early model.

He describes first learning of the instrument:

Before long, we got wind of this instrument called a Moog synthesizer, and it seemed like a dream come true, as far as I was concerned. We had been making our own electronic instruments: playing with tape recorders, jerry-rigging things together.

It turned out [Dr. Moog] was in upstate New York, which is not that far from Toronto, and we drove there in our Volkswagen psychedelic van to see him.

[. . . . .]

The keyboard was very important to [the Moog synthesizer], and he had this ribbon controller so you could actually play melodies. I was a fairly conventional musician, even though I was doing "avant garde" music, and I wanted to be able to play rock songs."

Mills-Cockell made several trips to Trumansburg to meet with Dr. Moog, and ultimately purchased a Moog Mark II synthesizer, which he proceeded to employ in Intersystems' performances:

We played across the country in Canada, we went into the States, we played in Illinois and Washington, and did that for about 2 years.

The Moog Mark II was destroyed in the same fire that consumed Syrinx's master tapes for Long Lost Relatives. Mills-Cockell soldiered on, replacing the Moog with an ARP 2500 in late 1971.

== Awards ==
Mills-Cockell's work has been the subject of numerous awards and grants.

In 1966, his Fragments for Orchestra, Study for Bassoon, Prepared Piano and Magnetic Tape won a BMI Student Composers' Award.

Since 1968, he has received numerous grants from the Canada Council for the Arts and the Ontario Arts Council.

His score for Half a Lifetime, a 1-hour drama directed by Daniel Petry for Astral Films & HBO was nominated for best musical score in the American Cable Awards.

His 1978 score for The Newcomers: The Italians received the CFTA award for Best Musical Score.

In 1981, his score for Terror Train received a Genie Award nomination for Best Music Score.

In 1989, he was awarded the ProCan award for "Outstanding Contribution to Music for Film".

== Personal life ==
Mills-Cockell lives on Vancouver Island with his partner, Jean.

He remains active in musical composition.
