= Yvan Patry =

Canadian documentary filmmaker

- Born: 1948; Iroquois Falls, Ontario, CA.
- Occupation: Director/Producer

Yvan Patry (1948–1999) was a Canadian documentary filmmaker.

Yvan was born in Iroquois Falls, Ontario.

During the 1970s he worked as a professor at Montmorency College in Laval, Quebec, where he produced several educational films.

Yvan's short film Octobre 68 was included in the SRC's public television series "Les temps changent". The NFB produced his first feature Ainsi soient-ils - a fiction film centred on Quebec youth and the new cultural mentality that came about after 1968. In 1974 Yvan Patry teamed with Bernard Lalond, Roger Frappier, Guy Bergeron, and André Gagnon to direct On a raison de se révolter, a film on workers' conflicts that was intended to politicize Quebec workers.

Throughout the 1980s Yvan made several trips to Nicaragua. He co-directed (with Danièle Lacourse) Nicaragua/Honduras: Entre deux guerres (1983), followed by Nicaragua: La guerre sale (1985); two significant documentaries on the war fought by the Contras against the population of Nicaragua. Yvan Patry and Danièle Lacourse continued to film together in regions of conflict through the 1980s and 1990s until Yvan's death in 1999. Their most notable works include The Rwandan Series, a 5-part in-depth look at the central African country. Hand of God, Hand of the Devil; Sitting on a Volcano; and Chronicle of a Genocide Foretold recount the horrifying crimes that took place before, during, and after the Rwandan genocide.

Chronicle of a Genocide Foretold won the Hot Docs "Best of Festival" award in 1998.

Yvan was also the founder of Alter Ciné, an organization of filmmakers and international journalists in cooperation with Third World organizations.

== Films as Director ==
- (1968) Octobre 68 (TV, short)
- (1969) Ainsi soient-ils
- (1974) On a raison de se révolter
- (1983) Nicaragua/Honduras: Entre deux guerres (co-dir.)
- (1985) Nicaragua: La guerre sale (co-dir.)
- (1986) The Forgotten War
- (1986) Songs of the Next Harvest
- (1986) A Time to Heal
- (1990) Nuit et Silence (TV, co-dir.)
- (1994) Denial
- (1994) L'histoire muselée (TV, co-dir.)
- (1995) Hand of God, Hand of the Devil (TV, co-dir.)
- (1996) We Were Cowards, a.k.a. Chronicle of a Genocide Foretold, Part 1 (co-dir.)
- (1996) We Feel Betrayed, a.k.a. Chronicle of a Genocide Foretold, Part 2 (co-dir.)
- (1996) Blood was Flowing Like a River, a.k.a. Chronicle of a Genocide Foretold, Part 3 (co-dir.)
