= Philip Hobel =

American film and television producer and distributor

Philip S. Hobel
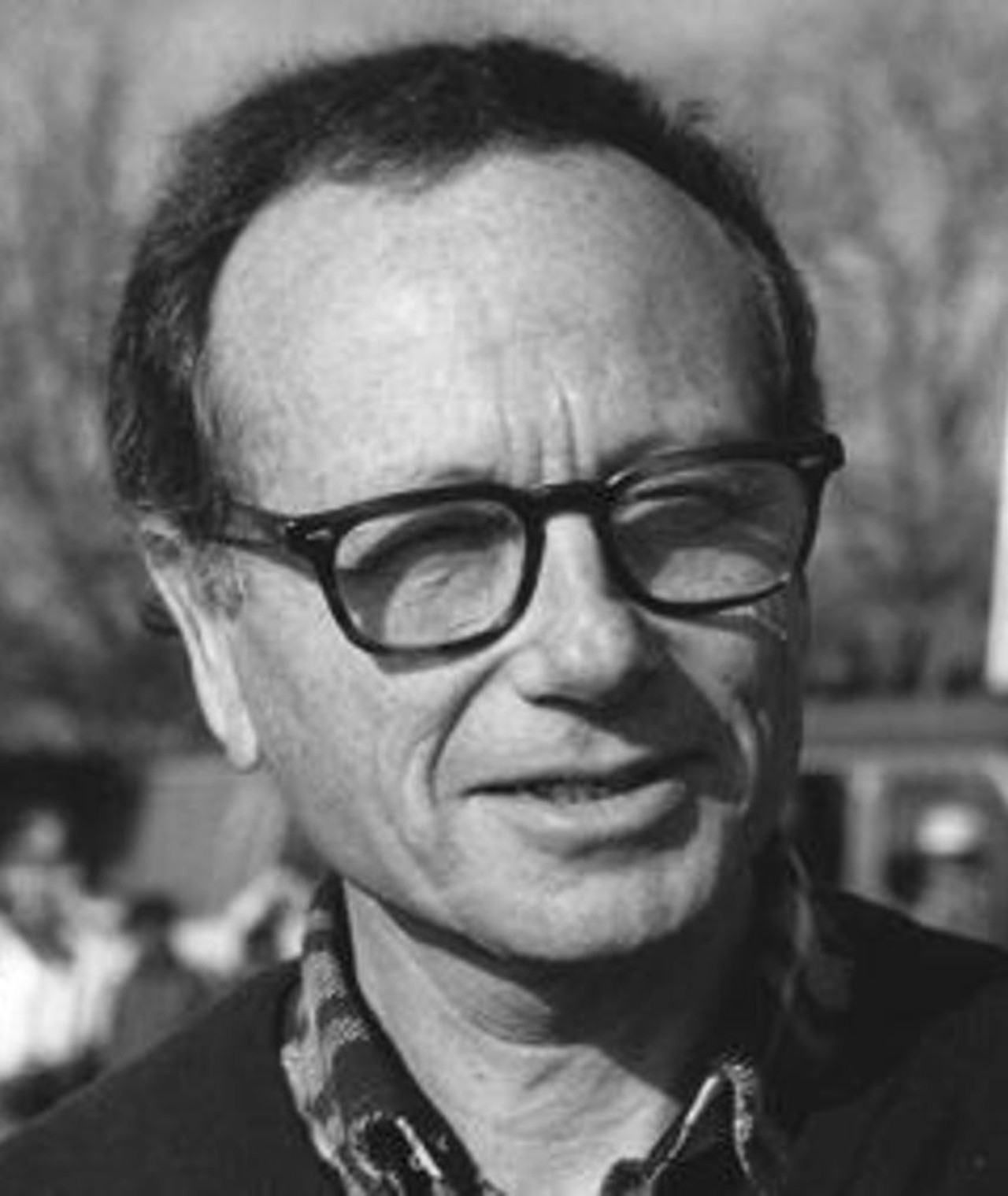
- Born: Philip Sherman Hobel; July 5, 1921; Manhattan, New York City, U.S.
- Died: October 23, 2013
- Education: Columbia College (Columbia University)
- Occupations: Film producer; Television producer; Film distributor
- Known for: Founder of The Cinema Guild; Producer of Tender Mercies (1983); Producer of The Fabulous Sixties and Here Come The Seventies
- Spouse: Mary-Ann Hobel (née Hirsch)
- Children: 3

Philip Sherman Hobel (July 5, 1921 – Octobert 23, 2013) was an American film and television producer and film distributor. He founded and owned The Cinema Guild and was involved in the production of television documentaries and feature films. He produced the feature film Tender Mercies (1983), which received five Academy Award nominations and won two at the 1984 Academy Awards ceremony.

== Early life and education ==
Hobel was a native of Manhattan and graduated from Columbia College in 1942. During World War II, he served in the United States Navy as a lieutenant.

== Career ==
=== Furniture Business ===
After World War II, Hobel served as the President of Cortland Furniture Company, a furniture manufacturer and wholesaler, until 1970.

=== Television production ===
In 1970, with producer Douglas Leiterman, he founded Hobel-Leiterman Productions and Document Associates. Hobel and Leiterman worked on documentary programming for the CTV Television Network. Their productions included a series of one-hour specials titled The Fabulous Sixties, with one episode covering each year of the decade. They later produced Here Come The Seventies, a half-hour series (broadcast 1970–1973) focused on anticipated technological innovations and developments. The series debuted on CTV in September 1970 and aired on Thursdays at 9:30 p.m. Its opening theme music, "Tillicum" by the Canadian group Syrinx, reached No. 38 on the Canadian charts on June 5, 1971.

=== Feature film ===
Hobel produced Tender Mercies (1983) with his wife, Mary-Ann Hobel, after actor Robert Duvall agreed to star and the Hobels optioned Horton Foote's screenplay for what became their first theatrically released feature film. The producers first contacted director Bruce Beresford in 1980 after seeing his film Breaker Morant (1980), and supported a research trip through small Texas towns prior to production. Principal photography took place from November 2 to December 23, 1981, in Waxahachie and Palmer, Texas, with additional scenes shot in Dallas. Duvall prepared for his role by moving to the area ahead of production and performing songs locally.

At the 1984 Academy Awards ceremony, Tender Mercies received five nominations: Best Picture (Philip S. Hobel, producer), Directing (Bruce Beresford), Actor in a Leading Role (Robert Duvall), Writing (Screenplay Written Directly for the Screen) (Horton Foote), and Music (Original Song) ("Over You"). It won in two categories: Actor in a Leading Role (Duvall) and Writing (Screenplay Written Directly for the Screen) (Foote).

=== Film distribution ===
Based in New York City, The Cinema Guild distributes independent, foreign, and documentary films. It was founded by Philip and Mary-Ann Hobel, who were known for work in documentaries and feature films.

== Personal life ==
Hobel was married to Mary-Ann (née Hirsch) for 63 years, and they had three children: Joseph, Michael, and Sara. He lived in New York City and East Hampton.

== Selected filmography ==
- The Fabulous Sixties (television specials; producer)
- Here Come The Seventies (television series, 1970–1973; producer)
- Tender Mercies (film, 1983; producer)
