= Erik Durschmied =

Austrian cinematographer (born 1930)

Erik Durschmied (born 25 December 1930) is a cinematographer, producer, director and also an author, military history professor and a former war correspondent for BBC, CBS. Newsweek called him a "supremely gifted reporter who has changed the media he works in", while The New York Times wrote "He has seen more wars than any living general." Durschmied is best known for his book The Hinge Factor (since retitled How Chance and Stupidity Have Changed History). For the sum of his literary work, (his books are published in two dozen languages) he received the honorary citizenship of Austria.

== Biography ==
Born on 25 December 1930 in Vienna, Austria, Durschmied got his first taste of war firsthand as a child when the Germans entered Vienna, and the Allied bombers reduced his neighborhood to rubble. In 1952, Durschmied emigrated to Canada and attended McGill University. As a war correspondent, he reported on the ground during every conflict from Vietnam to Iran-Iraq and Afghanistan. He reported for BBC from 1959 to 1971. Durschmied interviewed many international figures, including John F. Kennedy, Salvador Allende, David Ben-Gurion, and Saddam Hussein.

He also worked as a cinematographer, covering thirty years of worldwide conflicts. In 1958, he shot the only film about Fidel Castro, on-site with the rebel in the Sierra Maestra mountains. In January 1959, Durschmied travelled to Moscow to interview Guy Burgess, a member of Britain's Cambridge Five spy ring, for CBC. The 9 minute film was shown once on the network's Close Up program in March, and then forgotten. Burgess defected to the Soviet Union in 1951, and it was assumed only a few photographs existed of him after this point until Durschmied's 1959 interview was rediscovered more than 50 years later.

In 1964, Durschmied was part of the Canadian Broadcasting Corporation's documentary unit, with producer-director Patrick Watson, the first independent film crew ever allowed to shoot inside the People's Republic of China. Their 90-minute film (shot on B&W 16mm film) "The Seven Hundred Million" was released as part of the series This Hour has Seven Days, which dedicated every fourth Sunday night to a full-length documentary. The following year, he shot The Mills of the Gods: Vietnam for the CBC series Document; this episode won two Canadian Film Awards, Film of the Year and TV Information Certificate of Merit. In his ten years in Viet Nam, he produced a number of feature documentaries (BBC Panorama). In 1968, Durschmied shot the CBS Special Report Hill 943 in which he followed three soldiers in Alpha Company, 3rd Battalion, 12th Infantry of the 4th Infantry Division as they tried to capture Hill 943 in a bloody battle. In Afghanistan he followed Soviet units for CBS "Afghanistan – Under the Soviet Gun". Hanoi recalled him to Viet Nam in 1977 ("Viet Nam – Bitter Victory", for CBS), and then allowed him to follow the Vietnamese Army during their invasion of Pol Pot's Cambodia, where he reported from a devastated Phnom Penh. He also developed the television series Die Welt des GEO for Germany's UFA.

Of his work, Newsweek wrote "Durschmied is a supremely gifted reporter who has transformed the media he works in" and in Le Monde: "He's survived more battles than any living general." He is author of a series of highly popular books on military blunders that changed world history, translated into two dozen languages.

In later years, he has served as Lecturer of Military History at the Austrian Staff College, and has been a guest lecturer at the United States Military Academy at West Point. Durschmied lives with his family in France.

== Bibliography ==
- Shooting Wars: My Life As a War Cameraman, from Cuba to Iraq, Pharos Books, 1991. ISBN 0-88687-623-0
- Don't Shoot the Yanqui, HarperCollins Publishers, 1992. ISBN 0-586-20919-0
- L'Armée Rouge – Leur Dernière Bataille, Edition #1, Paris
- How Chance and Stupidity Have Changed History: The Hinge Factor, MJF Books, New York, 1999. ISBN 1-56731-738-3 (This book has also been printed under the title The Hinge Factor.)
- Whisper of the Blade: Revolutions, Mayhem, Betrayal, Glory and Death, Hodder & Stoughton, London, 2001. ISBN 0-340-77083-X
- The Hinges of Battle, Hodder & Stoughton, 2002. ISBN 0-340-81978-2
- The Weather Factor: How Nature has Changed History, Arcade Publishing, 2002 ISBN 1-55970-624-4
- From Armageddon to the Fall of Rome, Coronet Books, 2003. ISBN 0-340-82177-9
- Blood of Revolution: From the Reign of Terror to the Rise of Khomeini ISBN 1-55970-656-2
- Unsung Heroes : The Twentieth Century's Forgotten History-Makers, Hodder & Stoughton, 2004. ISBN 0-340-82520-0
- Whores of the Devil: Witch-Hunts and Witch-Trials, Sutton Publishing, 2005 ISBN 0-7509-4007-7
- Beware the Dragon, André Deutsch, 2009 ISBN 0-2330-0231-6

== Filmography (as cinematographer) ==
- National Geographic Special, 1964 IMDb
- The Seven Hundred Million, 1964 Film Reference Library
- Hill 943, 1968
- The Mills of the Gods: Vietnam, 1965 IMDb
