= Beverly Shaffer =

Canadian filmmaker

- Born: 1945 (age 80–81); Montreal, Quebec, Canada
- Education: McGill University (BA, 1967); Boston University (MA, 1971)
- Occupation: Filmmaker
- Notable work: I'll Find a Way (1977); To a Safer Place (1987); Mr Mergler's Gift (2004)

Beverly Shaffer is a filmmaker in Montreal, Quebec, Canada. Shaffer spent the bulk of her professional career with the National Film Board of Canada (NFB), directing short documentaries and dramas. Her documentary I'll Find a Way, about a young girl with spina bifida, won the 1977 Academy Award for Best Live Action Short Film.

== Career ==
Shaffer won more than forty international awards in her thirty-two years with the National Film Board. She joined the NFB's newly created women's studio, Studio D, in 1975 after her proposal for a series of short documentaries about children was approved by Studio D head Kathleen Shannon. The ten films in her Children of Canada series included the Oscar-winner I'll Find a Way.

To a Safer Place (1987) was an uplifting story of an incest survivor in her thirties who succeeded in building a fulfilling life after years of abuse. Shaffer directed seven episodes in the Children of Jerusalem series, featuring profiles of Arab and Jewish youth, including the titles Children of Jerusalem: Gesho and Children of Jerusalem: Yehuda. She also directed Just a Wedding (1999), a docudrama sequel to I'll Find a Way.

Her last film for the NFB, Mr Mergler's Gift, was short listed for an Academy Award in 2005. In June 2008, it was announced that she and colleague Paul Cowan would lose their positions as NFB staff filmmakers, due to budget cuts.

Although the bulk of her work has been in the documentary genre, Shaffer has at times turned her talents to drama. These include the half-hour drama The Way It Is (1982), about a young girl's reaction to her parents' divorce; Who Should Decide? (1985), one of eight short dramas in the Discussions in Bioethics series.

== Background ==
Born in Montreal in 1945, Shaffer graduated from McGill University in 1967, with a B.A. in comparative religion and philosophy. She taught high school for two years before doing a master's degree in filmmaking at Boston University. Upon graduation in 1971, she worked at WGBH-TV as a production assistant, researcher and associate producer on science and public affairs programs.

== Awards and honours ==
1977 Academy Award for Best Live Action Short Film - I’ll Find a Way

I’ll Find a Way - nominated for a BAFTA Award for Best Short Factual Film

== Filmography ==
- My Name is Susan Yee (1975)
- My Friends Call Me Tony (1975)
- Gurdeep Singh Bains (1975)
- Kevin Alec (1977)
- Beautiful Lennard Island (1977)
- I'll Find a Way (1977)
- Veronica (1977)
- Benoît (1978)
- Julie O’Brien (1981)
- It’s Just Better (1982)
- The Way It Is (1982)
- I want to Be an Engineer (1983)
- Discussions in Bioethics: Who Should Decide? (1985)
- To a Safer Place (1987)
- Children of Jerusalem- Tamar (1991)
- Children of Jerusalem- Asya (1992)
- Children of Jerusalem- Neveen (1992)
- Children of Jerusalem- Yacoub (1992)
- Children of Jerusalem- Yehuda (1994)
- Children of Jerusalem- Gesho (1996)
- Children of Jerusalem- Ibrahim (1996)
- Just a Wedding (1999)
- To my birthmother… (2002)
- Mr. Mergler's Gift (2004)
