= Eisha Marjara =

Canadian film director and writer

- Born: Trois-Rivières, Quebec, Canada
- Education: Concordia University
- Occupations: Film director, writer
- Years active: 1994–present
- Notable work: Desperately Seeking Helen
- Website: http://www.eishamarjara.com

Eisha Marjara is a Canadian film director and writer. With a background in photography, Marjara has written and directed several award-winning films, including the feature documentary Desperately Seeking Helen (1998) and The Incredible Shrinking Woman (1994).

She created a photo series and essay on the bombing of Air India Flight 182, in which her mother and sister were killed, entitled "Remember me Nought" It was featured in the fall 2013 issue of Descant magazine.

Her 2016 debut novel, titled Faerie (Arsenal Pulp Press), received a star review in Publishers Weekly.

== Career ==
Marjara's 1998 National Film Board of Canada docudrama Desperately Seeking Helen received critical acclaim and brought her international recognition. The movie depicts Marjara on a journey to India, exploring her own Indian roots by following the career of acclaimed Bollywood movie star and vamp Helen Richardson Khan. The movie received the jury award of the Munich Documentary Film Festival in 2000 as well as the Prix de La Semaine Critique at the Locarno International Film Festival the same year.

Marjara's Canadian-German co-production The Tourist, a short film, had its first showing at the 24th Rendez-vous du Cinéma Québécois in 2006.

In 2017 Marjara completed the feature film Venus, a dramedy about a 30-something professional who transitions into a woman then discovers that she is the father of a fourteen-year-old boy. The 95 minute film was produced by Joe Balass of Compass Productions Inc. and executive producer Kevin Tierney (Bon Cop, Bad Cop). It premiered at the British Film Institute at their Southbank event in June 2018. Venus was inspired by her short film House for Sale.

In 2022, Marjara wrote and directed the film Calorie, which premiered at the 2025 Calgary International Film Festival.

Marjare has been a member of the NFB/ ONF Creation group of directors.

== Personal life ==
Marjara is the daughter of father Dr. Harinder Singh Marjara, and mother Devinder. She had two sisters, Seema and Amita. She grew up in Trois-Rivières, Quebec, and she lived in Trois-Rivières, Sainte-Foy, and Montreal. In her community in her early childhood, there were not very many South Asian Canadians. She attended an English-language Catholic school, which she described as "very tiny". She later attended Champlain Regional College and Dawson College to obtain her CEGEP, and then Concordia University, enrolled in Communications Studies.

Her mother and her sister, Seema, were killed in the bombing of Air India Flight 182; they had been flying to visit relatives. Seema had just graduated from Centennial Regional High School. Eisha was not on board because she was being treated for anorexia nervosa, and her father was teaching a summer course at the time. Both Eisha and Amita Marjara along with father Harinder were interview subjects of the 2008 documentary Air India 182.

Marjara, along with her family, is Sikh.

== Works ==
=== Filmography ===
- The Incredible Shrinking Woman (1994)
- Desperately Seeking Helen (1999)
- The Tourist (2006)
- Lolita Diaries (2008)
- House for Sale (2012)
- Un Mot tel Idéal (2016)
- Venus (2017)
- Calorie (2025)

=== Novels ===
- Faerie (2016)

== See also ==
- List of female film and television directors
- List of LGBT-related films directed by women
