= Louise Abbott =

Canadian writer and filmmaker

- Born: 1950 (age 75–76)
- Education: McGill University
- Occupations: Non-fiction writer; photographer; filmmaker

Louise Abbott (born 1950) is a Canadian non-fiction writer, photographer, and filmmaker living in Quebec's Eastern Townships.

== Life and work ==
Abbott graduated from McGill University in 1972.

Her work has appeared in the Montreal Gazette, The Globe and Mail, The Canadian Encyclopedia, Canadian Heritage and Photo Life.

== Publications ==
- The Coast Way: a Portrait of the English on the Lower North Shore of the St Lawrence (McGill-Queen's University Press, 1988)
- The French Shore: Newfoundland's Port-au-Port Peninsula. Waterous.
- A Country So Wild and Grand
- The Heart of the Farm: a History of Barns and Fences in the Eastern Townships of Quebec. With Niels Jensen.
- Eeyou Istchee: Land of the Cree/Terre des Cris (COTA, 2010)
- Memphrémagog: An Illustrated History: Une Histoire Illustrée (Volume 1)
- Memphrémagog: An Illustrated History: Une Histoire Illustrée (Volume 2)

== Films ==
- The Pinnacle and the Poet
- Alexander Walbridge: The Visionary of Mystic
- Giving Shelter
- Crisscrossing Space and Time
- A Journey to Remember
- Nunaaluk: A Forgotten Story
- The Sugarmakers
- Niels Jensen, Cabinetmaker (2019) – short documentary
- The Ahiarmiut: Out-of-the-Way Dwellers (2020) – documentary
- CRUX: The Transformation of AnneBruce Falconer (2021) – short documentary
- Ayer's Cliff Fair

== Awards ==
- 2002 Canadian Journalism Foundation Greg Clark Internship Award
- 2002: Professional Writers Association of Canada's Norman Kucharsky Award for Cultural and Artistic Journalism
- 1989: Finalist, QSPELL Award (Quebec Society for the Promotion of English-Language Literature, now the Quebec Writers' Federation) for The Coast Way: A Portrait of the English on the Lower North Shore of the St. Lawrence
- 2014: Winner, Jasper Short Film Festival Best Film by an Established Filmmaker award for her documentary Nunaaluk: A Forgotten Story
