= Zefnoon Safi =

Afghan politician

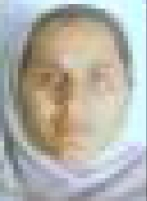
- Occupation: Member of the Wolesi Jirga

Zefnoon Safi is a former Afghan politician. In 2005 she was elected to the Wolesi Jirga, the lower house of Afghanistan's National Assembly, representing Laghman Province. She sat on the legislature's budget committee.

She has a Bachelor of Arts and was formerly a literacy teacher. After the withdrawal of US troops from Afghanistan and the rise of the Taliban, Safi and her family escaped to Greece, where they made a case for moving the Canada. She arrived first in Calgary in April 2022, then relocated to Edmonton, where she remains an activist for women's rights in Afghanistan. As of late 2024, two of her children remained trapped in Afghanistan.

Safi was one of four women profiled in the 2024 documentary film An Unfinished Journey.
