= Joe Balass =

Iraqi Canadian filmmaker

Joe Balass (born in Baghdad, Iraq) is an Iraqi Canadian filmmaker. He is gay.

Of Jewish heritage, Balass is most known for Nana, George and Me, which is an autobiographical video by a young, gay Iraqi Jewish filmmaker who takes a charmingly unconventional look at three Iraqi Jewish lives; that of the filmmaker, his 92-year-old Nana and his 73-year-old friend, George. It was screened at the Castro Theatre.

Balass escaped from Iraq with his family at age four, and eventually settled in Canada. He has previously worked as a freelance editor, photographer and producer. He has directed a number of short films and videos including; Tattoo Needle Pricks, On a Very Violet Night in the Apartements Daphne, Nana, George & me, which won a Télé-Québec Award at the Rendez-vous du cinéma québécois (RVCQ) in Montreal, and The Devil in the Holy Water.

His 2008 film Baghdad Twist is a National Film Board of Canada documentary about the disappearance of Iraq's Jewish community though his own family's history. The filmmaker's mother recounts their family's experiences, and the film is illustrated with Balass family home movies and photos and rare archival footage from Iraq.

In 2012, he directed his second feature doc, "JOY! Portrait of a Nun" featuring Sister Missionary Position Delight, one of the founders of the Sisters of Perpetual Indulgence.

In 2013, he directed the documentary La longueur de l'alphabet avec Naïm Kattan about the Canadian writer of Iraqi Jewish origin Naïm Kattan.

In 2014, he was honoured with a retrospective at the Cinémathèque québécoise.

== Filmography ==
- 1998 - Nana, George and Me
- 2002 - The Devil in the Holy Water
- 2006 - Derniers mots/Parting Words
- 2007 - Baghdad Twist
- 2012 - JOY! Portrait of a Nun
- 2013 - La longueur de l'alphabet avec Naïm Kattan
- 2025 - Calorie (producer)
