= Nargis Nehan =

Afghani politician (b. 1981)

Nargis Nehan (Dari: نرگس نهان; born in Kabul, Afghanistan, 1981) is an Afghan former politician who served as the acting Minister of Mines, Petroleum and Industries.

== Early life ==
Like many Afghans of her generation, Nehan was forced to flee Afghanistan as a child (at the age of 12) to escape her country's decades of warfare. Nehan's family fled Kabul during the Afghan Civil War (1992–1996) and Nehan grew up among the millions of Afghan refugees who had settled in Pakistan beginning with the Soviet occupation of their country during the 1980s. In Pakistan, Nehan financed her education by working with international non-government organizations providing help to the Afghan refugee community.

== Career ==
Nehan, who holds a master's degree in business administration, was working with the Norwegian Refugee Council following the United States' invasion of Afghanistan in 2001. After that invasion toppled Afghanistan's Taliban regime, the Norwegian aid organization assigned her to return to Kabul to open its office there. Nehan did so and subsequently left the organization to take a series of positions with the Afghan Interim Administration. Since that time, her government positions have included: director general of the Treasury Department at the Ministry of Finance, vice-chancellor for administration and finance at Kabul University and senior administrative advisory positions to the ministers of education and of higher education. Nehan managed reforms in the Treasury Department at the Ministry of Finance, and was involved in the development of a World Bank-funded, five-year strategic plan for the Ministry of Education.

Nehan was appointed as acting Minister of Mines, Petroleum and Industries in 2017. She is the second acting minister in this role since the resignation of Daud Shah Saba in 2016.

After Taliban gained control over Kabul in August 2021, Nehan evacuated to Norway.

== Publications ==
In 2007, Nehan co-authored a book with Ashraf Ghani Ahmadzai, entitled The Budget as a Linchpin of the State: Lessons from Afghanistan.

== Activism ==
Nehan is the founder of EQUALITY for Peace and Democracy, an organization whose stated mission is "to empower women and youth to become active decision-makers, by electing their leaders and representatives through voting, monitoring state institutions performance and holding them accountable for public policies and resources, and also becoming agents of change in their communities and daily lives."

Nehan is a member of the Civil Society Joint Working Group (CS-JWG), the Afghan Coalition for Transparency and Accountability (ACTA), and the Supreme Council of Da Afghanistan Bank, the country's central bank. She was the first woman to be a member of the central bank's leadership.

She has since relocated to Canada, where she remains an activist for women's rights in Afghanistan. She was profiled in the 2024 documentary film An Unfinished Journey.
