= Dreamland: The Burning of Black Wall Street =

2021 American documentary film

- Directed by: Salima Koroma
- Music by: Amanda Jones
- Country of origin: United States
- Original language: English

Production
- Producer: Salima Koroma
- Production company: SpringHill Entertainment

Original release
- Network: CNN
- Release: May 31, 2021

Dreamland: The Burning of Black Wall Street is a 2021 American documentary film, directed and produced by Salima Koroma. LeBron James serves as an executive producer under his SpringHill Entertainment banner. The film follows the cultural renaissance existing in the Tulsa, Oklahoma district, and investigates the Tulsa race massacre.

It was released on May 31, 2021, by CNN.

== Synopsis ==
The film follows the cultural renaissance which is currently taking place in the Tulsa, Oklahoma district, and it also investigates the Tulsa race massacre.

== Production ==
In June 2020, it was announced that Salima Koroma would direct and produce a documentary film about the Tulsa race massacre, with LeBron James who is set to serve as an executive producer under his SpringHill Entertainment banner.

== Release ==
In October 2020, CNN Films acquired U.S. distribution rights to the film. It was released on May 31, 2021.
