= Jasmine Salinas =

NHRA Professional Race Car Driver

- Nationality: American
- Born: January 4, 1992 (age 34) San Jose, California, U.S.
- Relatives: Mike Salinas (father)

NHRA Mission Foods Drag Racing Series career
- Debut season: 2024
- Current team: Scrappers Racing
- Crew chief: Joe Barlam
- Fastest laps: Best ET; 3.691 seconds; Best Speed; 334.90 mph (538.97 km/h)

Previous series
- 2019–2023: Lucas Oil Drag Racing

Championship titles
- 2022: North Central Regional Champion
- Statistics up to date as of September 15, 2025.

Jasmine Monique Salinas (born January 4, 1992) is an American NHRA drag racer. She is the daughter of drag racer Mike Salinas and the sister of fellow racer Jianna Evaristo-Salinas.

== Racing career ==
=== Early career ===
Salinas started racing at the age of 15 in the NHRA Junior Drag Racing Series alongside her 3 sisters.

=== NHRA Lucas Oil Series ===
In 2019, Salinas made her debut in Top Alcohol Dragster and finished her rookie season 15th in points. She appeared on the cover of Drag Illustrated's 'Women of Power' issue with her sister, Jianna.

In 2021, Salinas experienced a blow over crash during the final round of qualifying at Gainesville Raceway. Despite a crash at the start of the season, she finished sixth in National Standings and second in Regional Standings with 1 Regional Event win.

In 2022, Salinas scored her 1st National Event win right back at Gainesville Raceway, exactly 1 year after surviving a harrowing over-the-wall crash at the very same track. She would go on to win three more races that season, including tying for second in the World and securing the North Central Regional Championship. She was selected to be part of Drag Illustrated's '30 Under 30' and appeared on the magazine's cover for that issue as well.

In 2023, Salinas competed part-time in Top Alcohol Dragster to focus her efforts on her professional transition into Top Fuel Dragster. In August, she earned her licensed in Top Fuel Dragster, thus making her one of the fastest Women on the planet.

=== NHRA Mission Foods Series ===
She will make her professional debut in 2024 for Scrappers Racing, where they will field a 2 car team. Both she and her father will make history as the first Father-Daughter duo in NHRA Top Fuel Dragster.

=== Gainesville Crash ===
In 2021, during the AMALIE Motor Oil NHRA Nationals in Gainesville, Florida, Salinas experienced a blow over crash during the final round of qualifying. The car went airborne as she passed the 1/8 mile and flew across the track, over the left guardrail, and flipped several times until eventually coming to a stop in the outside embankment.

The NHRA issued a statement that said Salinas’ “dragster stood up and blew over before coming to a stop” in the class’ final pairing of the session. She was able to crawl out of the car under her own power and was later transported to a local hospital for evaluation. She suffered bruising but no major injuries.

== Personal life ==
Salinas is of Dutch-Indonesian and Mexican-Commanche-Spanish descent. Her family resides in the San Francisco Bay Area in California. She is the oldest of four girls. She is the daughter of NHRA Top Fuel driver Mike Salinas and the sister of Pro Stock Motorcycle rider Jianna Evaristo.

Salinas attended The University of San Francisco where she studied Mandarin Chinese and received a degree in Global Studies.

In 2019, Salinas was the subject of a documentary, 'Five Foot 280' which was accepted into several film festivals. The documentary short follows Salinas through her adrenaline-filled world of driving a 3,500 horsepower car while describing the challenges of being a female in a male-dominated sport.

Salinas currently resides in Indianapolis, Indiana for her racing career.

== Motorsports career results ==
=== Lucas Oil Series ===
Season	Class	Races	Wins	Finals	Points	Position	Ref
2019	Top Alcohol Dragster	13	0	1	324	15th	
2021	Top Alcohol Dragster	18	1	3	518	6th	
2022	Top Alcohol Dragster	16	4	2	659	3rd	
2023	Top Alcohol Dragster	10	0	0	316	14th	

=== Mission Foods Series ===
Season	Class	Races	Wins	Finals	Points	Position	Ref
2024	Top Fuel						
