= The Sixties (TV program) =

- Genre: Public affairs
- Presented by: Frank McGee (1963–65); Charles Lynch (1965–66)
- Country of origin: Canada
- Original language: English
- No. of seasons: 3

Production
- Producer: Cameron Graham
- Production location: Ottawa
- Running time: 30 minutes

Original release
- Network: CBC Television
- Release: 3 November 1963 – 11 April 1966

Related
- Citizens' Forum

The Sixties is a Canadian current affairs television program which aired on CBC Television from 1963 to 1966.

== Premise ==
This program was similar to Citizens' Forum in that it was a co-production of the CBC and the Canadian Association for Adult Education which concerned newsworthy topics. Episodes featured a panel discussion which was led by Frank McGee for the first two seasons then by Charles Lynch in the final season. Subjects of international scope were presented such as foreign assistance, English-French relations in Canada, or the situation within and near the Communist Bloc.

== Broadcast ==
The program was broadcast on Sunday afternoons in the first season after which it appeared on late Monday evenings. The half-hour program was broadcast as follows:

Day	Time	Start	End
Sunday	5:00 p.m.	3 November 1963	26 April 1964
Monday	10:00 p.m.	9 November 1964	26 April 1965
Monday	10:00 p.m.	15 November 1965	11 April 1966
