= Beryl Fox =

Canadian film director and producer (born 1931)

- Born: December 10, 1931 (age 94); Winnipeg, Manitoba, Canada
- Occupations: Film director and producer
- Years active: 1962–1982
- Spouse: Douglas Leiterman

Beryl Fox (born December 10, 1931) is a Canadian documentary film director and producer.

== Biography ==
Beryl Fox was born in 1931 in Winnipeg, Manitoba. She dropped out of high school a year before graduating and worked a series of selling and clerical jobs before going back to school to take business classes at night. At 25 years of age she enrolled at the University of Toronto where she studied history. After graduating she was hired by the CBC and worked there from 1962 to 1966, first as a script assistant and researcher and then as a film director. Fox had a gift for understanding contemporary social and political conflicts.

Fox was the first Canadian to do in depth, and frequently critical, explorations of the Vietnam War, race riots, and feminism in the United States. She has won three Canadian Film Awards; the first for Summer in Mississippi in 1965, a film about the civil rights movement and the second and third awards for her best-known film, The Mills of the Gods: Viet Nam, in 1966. The film was shot entirely on location while the war was ongoing and had no narration and no archive footage. She continued making documentaries for another decade before branching out into producing feature films for mainstream audiences, beginning with 1981's Surfacing. In 1966, Fox became the first Canadian to be recognized with a George Polk Award 1966, for her work on the film.

Fox was married to Douglas Leiterman, a CBC news producer whose show This Hour Has Seven Days aired several of Fox's documentary films, until his death in 2012.

== Selected filmography ==
- One More River (1963)
- Three on a Match (1963)
- The Single Woman and the Double Standard (1964)
- Summer in Mississippi (1964)
- The Mills of the Gods: Viet Nam (1965)
- Youth: In Search of Morality (1966)
- Saigon: Portrait of a City (1967)
- Last Reflections on a War (1968)
- Memorial to Martin Luther King (1969)
- North with the Spring (1970)
- The Visible Woman (1975)
- Heavy Horse Pull (1978)
