= Compete Magazine =

LGBTQ magazine

- COMPETE Magazine Vol. 5, Issue 4, May, 2011
- Publishers: Eric Carlyle, SDLT
- Staff writers: Editor In Chief: Connie Wardman, SDLT; Art Director: Heather Brown
- Categories: Sports Magazine
- Frequency: Bi-Monthly
- Circulation: Print/Digital: 80,000+ Radio: 40,000+
- Founded: 2006
- First issue: 2007
- Company: Media Out Loud, LLC
- Country: United States
- Based in: Scottsdale, Arizona
- Language: English
- Website: www.competenetwork.com
- ISSN: 1946-3189

Compete Magazine is an American LGBTQ niche market health, fitness, and sports magazine and sporting events company. Compete is published by Scottsdale, Arizona-based Media Out Loud, LLC's Compete Sports Media division. The magazine is published monthly.

== History ==
Compete was founded in 2006 by Eric Carlyle and David Riach, then members of the Phoenix Storm gay rugby team.. After attending the Bingham Cup, the world championship of gay rugby, the men noticed a lack of media coverage and Compete Magazine was born (originally as Sports Out Loud).

The Preview Issue was launched in February 2007 and distributed primarily to the media, ad buyers and select readers at such gay festivals as Phoenix Pride. In June 2007 the first official issue debuted, featuring amateur gay athletes from Dallas, Texas modeling swimwear. The launch was covered by NBC-TV as numerous other media outlets. Many reports and blogs called the magazine "groundbreaking" for its coverage of gay sports.

In 2007 Eric Carlyle and David Riach were named finalists in PlanetOut's Entrepreneur of the Year Award which inspired the two to offer a similar award to an athlete within the gay sports community. In the May/June Issue of 2008, Jeff Kagan of New York was named the magazine's first Athlete of the Year. The tradition continues each December when celebrity judges select an amateur gay athlete as Compete's latest Athlete of the Year.

In May 2010 Media Out Loud, LLC announced a new, interactive website renamed Compete Network. After the success of the website, the company announced an agreement with QNation.fm to air a weekly radio show, Compete Radio.
