= Mike Salinas (drag racer) =

American drag racer

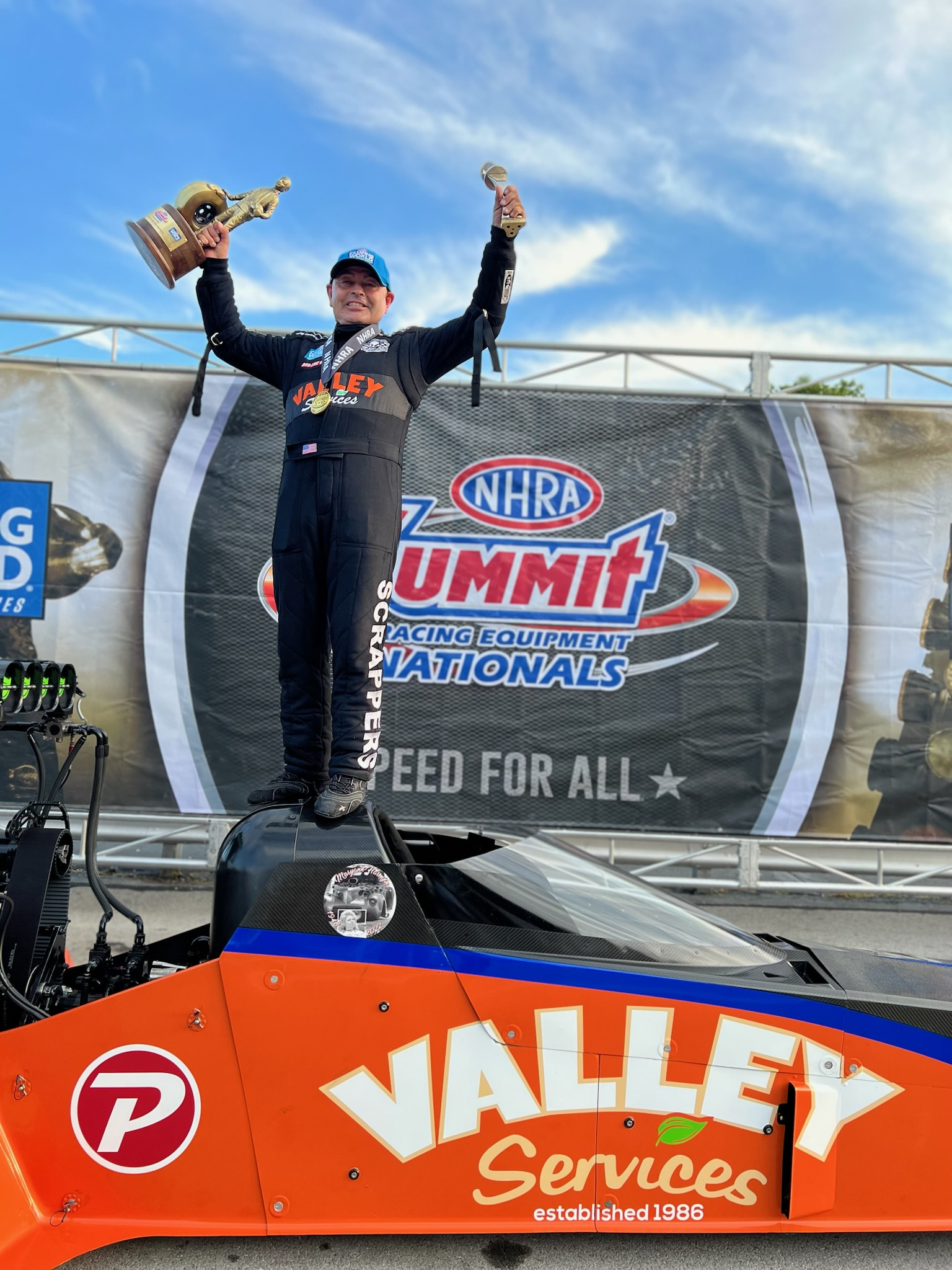
- Nationality: American
- Born: April 27, 1961 (age 65) San Jose, California, U.S.
- Relatives: Jasmine Salinas (daughter), Jianna Evaristo (daughter)

NHRA Mission Foods Drag Racing Series career
- Debut season: 2011
- Current team: Scrappers Racing
- Wins: 9
- Fastest laps: 3.647 seconds / 338.26 mph

Michael George Salinas (born April 27, 1961) is an American NHRA drag racer. He is the father of drag racers Jasmine Salinas and Jianna Evaristo.

== Racing career ==
=== Early career ===
Salinas was introduced to racing by his dad who raced during the 60’s and 70’s at Fremont Drag Strip and Little Bonneville in California. From 2001 to 2009, he began competing in the Nostalgia Eliminator 1 and 7.0 Pro Class at his home tracks in Bakersfield and Sacramento. In 2009, he decided to pursue his professional license and received his NHRA license in Top Fuel at the Texas Motorplex.

=== NHRA Top Fuel Dragster & Pro Mod ===
In 2011, Salinas made his professional debut in NHRA Top Fuel on a part-time schedule. It wouldn't be until 2018 where he would begin racing on a full-time schedule.

In 2021, Salinas made his Professional debut in a second category, Pro Mod, competing in the NHRA E3 Spark Plugs Series while simultaneously competing in Top Fuel.

Throughout his professional career, Salinas has secured nine event wins, reset multiple speed and track records, and became the first person in Motorsports History to reach 300 mph in the 1/8th mile.

=== Career highlights ===
2017

- Earned a career-best two round wins.
- Qualified for the Auto Club Road to the Future Award
- Reset career bests in time (3.779) in Sonoma and speed (324.90) in Pomona.
- Qualified at all seven races he attended.

2018

- Reached NHRA Countdown to the Championship for the first time
- Made first final-round appearance in Bristol
- Reset career bests in elapsed time and speed

2019

- Earned first career win in Las Vegas (spring) and went on to win in Bristol
- Raced to a career-best elapsed time and speed
- Secured five No. 1 qualifier positions

2021

- Picked up second straight win at Bristol
- Advanced to four final rounds
- Earned two No. 1 qualifiers
- Finished a career-best third in points

2022

- Finished in the top five for a second straight year
- Won a career-best four races
- Advanced to six final rounds and was the points leader for two races
- Picked up three No. 1 qualifiers

2023

- Made motorsports history with the first 300 mph 1/8th mile run at Betway NHRA Carolina Nationals
- Qualified for Pep Boys All Star Shootout
- Made the 3rd fastest pass in NHRA History with 338.26 mph at Brainerd International Raceway, making him the fastest Man in NHRA

== Personal life ==
Salinas is of Mexican-Commanche-Spanish descent. His family resides in the San Francisco Bay Area in California. He is the father of NHRA Top Fuel driver Jasmine Salinas and Pro Stock Motorcycle rider Jianna Evaristo.

When he's not racing, Salinas and his wife, Monica, along with his daughters, have been running their family-owned business, Valley Services, since 1986.

== Motorsports Career Results ==
=== Top Fuel ===
Season	Series	Races	Wins	RU	#1 Pole	Points	Position	Ref
2017	Mello Yello	7	0	0	0	268	18	
2018	Mello Yello		0	1	1	2308	7	
2019	Mello Yello	21	2		5	2381	7	
2021	Camping World	19	2	4	2	2614	3	
2022	Camping World	21	4	6	3	2461	4	
2023	Camping World	21	2	1	4	2465	5	
2024	Mission Foods							
