= Douglas Leiterman =

Canadian television producer (1927–2012)

- Born: 1927; South Porcupine, Ontario, Canada
- Died: 19 December 2012 (aged 85); Vero Beach, Florida, U.S.
- Occupations: television producer, journalist
- Known for: This Hour Has Seven Days
- Spouse(s): Mary Cassie; Beryl Fox

Douglas Leiterman (1927 – 19 December 2012) was a Canadian television producer.

== Early life ==
Douglas Stone Leiterman was born in 1927 in South Porcupine, Ontario. In 1945, before his 18th birthday, he joined the Canadian Merchant Navy and became Second Mate on his ship; his career ended when poor working conditions led him to become involved in a mutiny. He and his wife settled in West Vancouver and he earned his Bachelor of Arts degree at the University of British Columbia while working nights as a Vancouver Province reporter. In 1954, he moved to the U.S. to study Economics at Harvard University on a Nieman Fellowship. He then became a correspondent on Parliament Hill in Ottawa for the Southam News Service.

== Career ==
In the early 1960s, Leiterman joined the CBC, where he became well known for the show This Hour Has Seven Days which he co-produced with Patrick Watson from 1964 to 1966. After that series was cancelled, Leiterman joined CBS to provide advice for the development of 60 Minutes, and he produced the CBC special "Sixteen in Webster Grove".

Leiterman produced other series such as The Fabulous Sixties and Here Come the Seventies (CTV, 1969–1972). He produced documentaries for the United Nations and a nature film documentary series.

In 1970, with producer Philip Hobel, he founded Hobel-Leiterman Productions, aka Document Associates. In 1971, he was part of a group that founded Wired City Communications, as a division of Innovation, Science and Economic Development Canada.

In 1982, he founded Motion Picture Guarantors Ltd., and The Motion Picture Bond Company Ltd., which became the second-largest completion bond company in the world. He operated both companies internationally and bonded such films as "Peter The Great" and TV series such as "Baywatch". He sold his companies to American International Group when he retired in 1998.

== Personal life and death ==
Leiterman's brother was the cinematographer Richard Leiterman. His sister Elaine Campbell was married to producer Norman Campbell; another sister, Phyllis, was married to film director Allan King, and his sister Mary was married to Ibiza architect Rolph Blakstad.

With his first wife, Mary Cassie, Leiterman had five children. In 1968, he divorced Mary and married the filmmaker Beryl Fox; they had one daughter.

Leiterman, who was a Christian Scientist, died at his winter residence in Vero Beach, Florida on 19 December 2012. He was survived by his wife Beryl Fox, their daughter and three of his daughters from his first marriage.
