= Vinegar Hill Historic District =

Historic district in Indiana, United States

- U.S. National Register of Historic Places
- U.S. Historic district
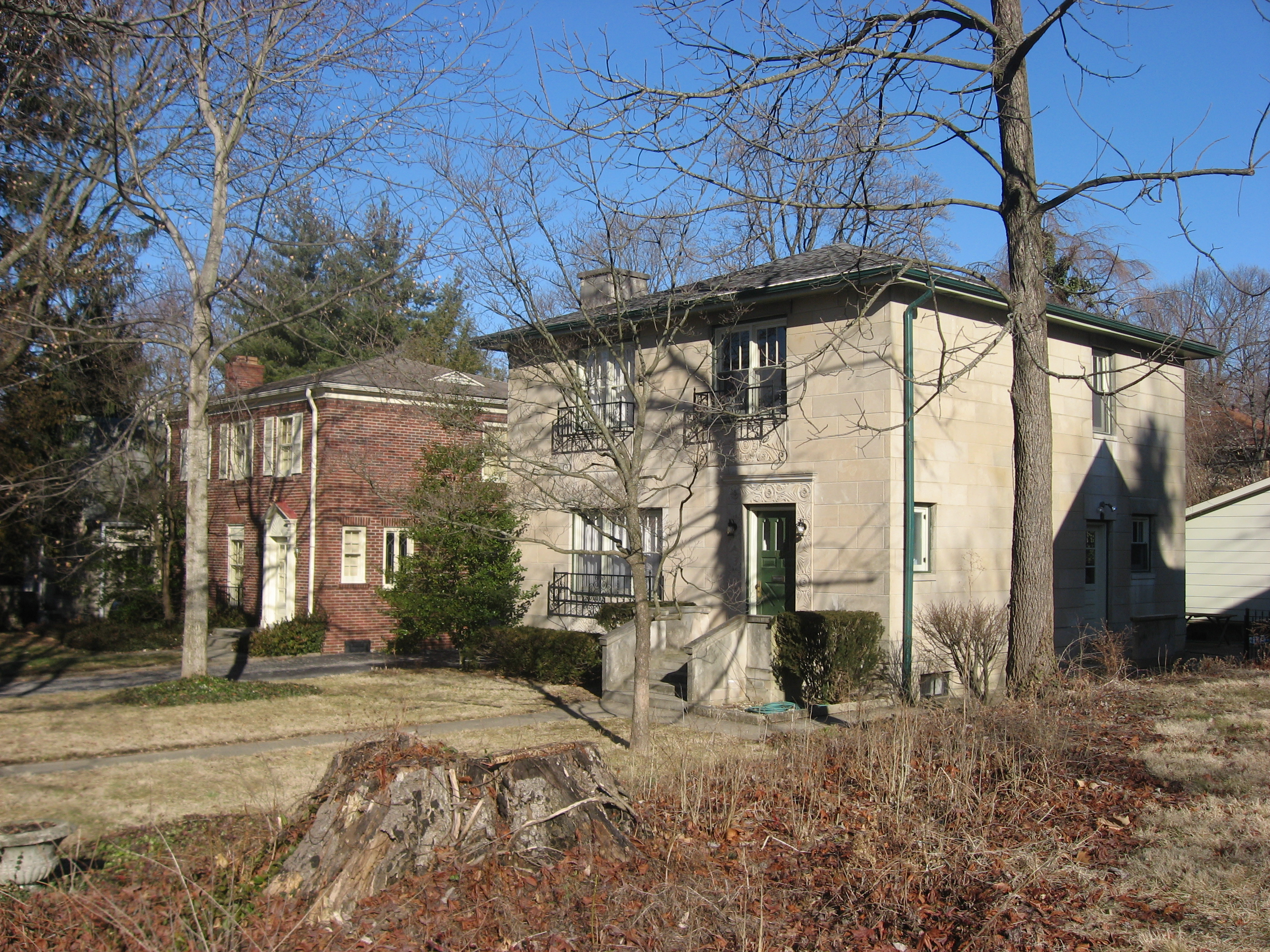
- Houses in the district

- Location within Indiana Location within the United States
- Location: E. 1st St. from Woodlawn to Jordan and S. Sheridan to E. Maxwell, Bloomington, Indiana
- Coordinates: 39°9′33″N 86°31′10″W
- Area: 21 acres (8.5 ha)
- Architect: Alfred Grindle, et al.
- Architectural style: Multiple
- NRHP reference No.: 05000195
- Added to NRHP: June 17, 2005

The Vinegar Hill Historic District is a historic district and neighborhood in Bloomington, Indiana, United States. Built primarily in the second quarter of the twentieth century, and located a few blocks south of Indiana University Bloomington campus, Vinegar Hill has been the home of leading Indiana University faculty members. It has inspired literary attention, and it has been designated a historic site.

== Construction ==
Rapid growth in the importance of Bloomington's limestone industry made limestone company executives wealthy and created heavy demand for skilled stonecutters in the city. As limestone became the city's leading industry in the 1920s, an apple orchard was removed to permit the extension of First Street eastward up a long hill and the platting of a new neighborhood. Several other city neighborhoods, such as the distinctive Prospect Hill, already bore topographical names; according to local tradition, the fermentation of apples from the orchard produced a distinctive smell that became the neighborhood's namesake. The first families to build houses in this new development were those of stonecutters, many of whom were European immigrants. Leading among these families were the Donatos, whose members built seven significant houses in the neighborhood. Because so many of the new residents were skilled stoneworkers, they decorated their houses with carvings and sculptures that would have been far too expensive for all but the richest members of society. At the top of Vinegar Hill were the mansions of the wealthy limestone executives; like the workers' houses below them, these homes featured ornate stonework with images such as those of the children of the homeowners. Yet other residents of the district were some prominent Indiana University faculty, including sexology professor Alfred Kinsey, music dean Winfred Merrill, and Nobel-winning biology professor Hermann Muller.

== Architecture ==
As limestone workers and owners, the residents of Vinegar Hill naturally looked to limestone as the material for their own houses. They used these materials to construct residences in a wide range of architectural styles, including American Craftsman, Neoclassical, and Art Deco. Inside, the houses were also ornate: many feature mantels and balusters of carven stone, and the four houses built by Christopher Donato also include elaborate transoms and lintels. The most prominent houses in the neighborhood are the hilltop homes of the wealthy near the eastern end of the district; here may be found styles such as Tudor Revival and Georgian-influenced Colonial Revival. Throughout the district, many houses are found in various forms of Colonial and English Revivals, and multiple Spanish Colonial Revivals are among the most significant residences of the lower part of the hill. Among the books that have concentrated on the architecture of Vinegar Hill is Carol Shields' novel The Stone Diaries, in which the neighborhood is part of the setting for much of the novel.

Closely related to the neighborhood's distinctive architecture is the unusually significant lawn furniture present around many of the houses. Objects such as detailed individual portraits, carvings of lions and griffins, and sculptures of children make the neighborhood unique: it is the only neighborhood anywhere in Indiana in which lawn furniture is a major element of the area's historic nature.

== Historic assessment ==
Between 1999 and 2001, historic preservation officials working with the city of Bloomington surveyed the entire city and identified over two thousand buildings that were deemed to be historic to one extent or another, most of which were concentrated in several historic districts. Composing one of these districts were sixty-one buildings on Vinegar Hill; deemed contributing properties, they help to make the district historic. These buildings were divided into three classifications: Outstanding, Notable, and Contributing. Properties rated as "Outstanding" were deemed to be historically significant enough to deserve consideration for inclusion on the National Register of Historic Places by themselves; "Notable" properties were worthy of special consideration, although not likely to be worthy of individual National Register status; "Contributing" locations were seen as significant parts of their historic districts, but not of great significance by themselves. Eight of Vinegar Hill's contributing properties received an "Outstanding" rating, and thirteen were deemed "Notable;" only thirty-one were called "Contributing." The district includes a disproportionately large number of above-average properties: about 13% of the city's sites were named either "Notable" or "Outstanding," in contrast to 40% of those on Vinegar Hill. Particularly unusual is the concentration of eight "Outstanding" properties, which represented one-eighth of all such buildings citywide.

In 2003, a movement started to have Vinegar Hill accorded the national recognition that it was seen as lacking, and the city received a historic preservation grant from the state government for use in the district. In an attempt to have it nominated to the National Register of Historic Places, an Indiana University class began collecting detailed information about the district's houses and interviewed many residents in order to gather support for the proposed nomination. Support grew for according federal recognition to the neighborhood, and it was officially added to the National Register on June 17, 2005. Although the city-designated historic district encompasses fifty-two contributing properties, all of which are buildings, the area designated as historic by the federal government comprises seventy-one contributing buildings and thirty-eight other contributing sites, structures, and objects.

== Table of contributing properties ==
Appearing in the table below are the buildings included within the boundaries of the city-designated historic district.

Rating	Image	Address	Year	Style	Comments
Notable		1001 First Street; 39°9′34″N 86°31′20.5″W	1948	Dutch Colonial Revival	Home of Hermann Muller; known as the "Muller House"
Outstanding		1002 First Street; 39°9′33″N 86°31′21″W	1934	Spanish Colonial Revival	Known as the "Mazzullo House"
Contributing		1006 First Street; 39°9′33″N 86°31′20″W	1926–27	Dutch Colonial Revival	
Contributing		1010 First Street; 39°9′33″N 86°31′19.5″W	1945	American Foursquare	
Notable		1014 First Street; 39°9′33″N 86°31′19″W	1928	Arts and Crafts/Bungalow	Known as the "Franzman House"
Contributing		1017 First Street; 39°9′34″N 86°31′19″W	1927	Colonial Revival	Known as "The Manhammer"
Contributing		1018 First Street; 39°9′33″N 86°31′18.2″W	1928	American Foursquare	
Outstanding		1019 First Street; 39°9′34″N 86°31′18″W	1941	Art Deco	Built by Chris Donato
Contributing		1022 First Street; 39°9′33″N 86°31′17.5″W	1955	Tudor Revival	
Outstanding		1025 First Street; 39°9′34″N 86°31′17.4″W	1940	Art Deco	Built by Chris Donato
Contributing		1026 First Street; 39°9′33″N 86°31′16.8″W	1929	Spanish Colonial Revival	
Contributing		1104 First Street; 39°9′33″N 86°31′15.6″W	1928	Colonial Revival	
Notable		1107 First Street; 39°9′34″N 86°31′16.8″W	1938	Renaissance Revival	Known as the "Donato House"
Contributing		1108 First Street; 39°9′33″N 86°31′14.7″W	1928	Colonial Revival	
Contributing		1109 First Street; 39°9′34″N 86°31′16″W	1937	Colonial Revival	
Notable		1111 First Street; 39°9′34″N 86°31′15.3″W	1940–41	Art Deco	
Contributing		1112 First Street; 39°9′33″N 86°31′14″W	1928	American Foursquare	
Contributing		1113 First Street; 39°9′34″N 86°31′14.7″W	1937–40	Colonial Revival	
Contributing		1115 First Street; 39°9′34″N 86°31′14″W	1932–36	French Renaissance Revival	
Outstanding		1116 First Street; 39°9′33″N 86°31′13.2″W	1928	Spanish Colonial Revival	
Outstanding		1119 First Street; 39°9′34″N 86°31′13.2″W	1937–40	Spanish Colonial Revival	Known as the "Anthony House"
Contributing		1120 First Street; 39°9′33″N 86°31′12″W	1928	Dutch Colonial Revival	
Contributing		1122 First Street; 39°9′33″N 86°31′7″W	1930	American Foursquare	
Notable		1123 First Street; 39°9′34″N 86°31′12″W	1933	Spanish Colonial Revival	Known as the "Bruner House"
Contributing		1127 First Street; 39°9′34″N 86°31′11.4″W	1951	Colonial Revival	
Contributing		1130 First Street; 39°9′33″N 86°31′9.6″W	1928	Colonial Revival	
Contributing		1200 First Street; 39°9′33″N 86°31′8.8″W	1927	Renaissance Revival	
Contributing		1202 First Street; 39°9′33″N 86°31′8″W	1926	Tudor Revival	
Notable		1213 First Street; 39°9′34″N 86°31′6.4″W	1938–39	Tudor Revival	Known as the "Humphries House"
Contributing		1214 First Street; 39°9′33″N 86°31′5.2″W	1934	French Provincial	
Contributing		1220 First Street; 39°9′33″N 86°31′4.4″W	1939	Colonial Revival	
Contributing		1300 First Street; 39°9′33″N 86°31′3.2″W	1928	Colonial Revival	
Notable		1319 First Street; 39°9′34″N 86°31′1.6″W	1928	Tudor Revival	Known as the "David Wylie House"; designed and built by Charles A. Pike Construction
Notable		1320 First Street; 39°9′33″N 86°31′1″W	1927	Tudor Revival	Home of Alfred Kinsey; known as the "Kinsey House". Designed and built by Charles A. Pike Construction
Notable		1323 First Street; 39°9′34″N 86°31′1″W	1928	Tudor Revival	Known as the "Cline House"; designed and built by Charles A. Pike Construction
Outstanding		1327 First Street; 39°9′34″N 86°31′0″W	1928	Tudor Revival	Known as the "Woodward House"; designed by Alfred Grindle
Notable		1330 First Street; 39°9′33″N 86°30′59.6″W	1928	American Foursquare	Known as the "Krebs House"
Contributing		714 Ballantine Road; 39°9′34.5″N 86°31′10″W	1928	Colonial Revival	
Contributing		720 Ballantine Road; 39°9′34″N 86°31′10″W	1927	Colonial Revival	
Contributing		721 Ballantine Road; 39°9′34″N 86°31′8″W	1937	Tudor Revival	
Outstanding		725 Highland Avenue; 39°9′34″N 86°31′3″W	1927	Tudor Revival	Known as the "Irvin Matthews House"; designed by Alfred Grindle
Contributing		700 Jordan Avenue; 39°9′36″N 86°31′0″W	1933	Tudor Revival	
Contributing		701 Jordan Avenue; 39°9′35.4″N 86°30′58″W	1930	Tudor Revival	
Contributing		710 Jordan Avenue; 39°9′35.4″N 86°30′58″W	1930	Tudor Revival	
Contributing		719 Jordan Avenue; 39°9′34.5″N 86°30′58″W	1930	Colonial Revival	
Contributing		727 Jordan Avenue; 39°9′34″N 86°30′58″W	1930	Tudor Revival	
Notable		800 Sheridan Drive; 39°9′32.4″N 86°30′58″W	1938	Georgian Revival	Known as the "Hoadley House"
Notable		824 Sheridan Drive; 39°9′31.5″N 86°30′56.4″W	1928	French Renaissance Revival	Known as the "Merrill House"; designed by Ernest Flagg
Notable		836 Sheridan Drive; 39°9′30″N 86°30′55″W	1930	Renaissance Revival	
Contributing		837 Sheridan Drive; 39°9′30.8″N 86°30′52.8″W	1929	Tudor Revival	Known as the "Sullivan House"
Contributing		840 Sheridan Drive; 39°9′29.2″N 86°30′55.2″W	1938	Tudor Revival	
Outstanding		715-717 Woodlawn Avenue; 39°9′34.8″N 86°31′21″W	1937	Eclectic	
