= Susanna Moodie: Roughing it in the Bush =

Graphic novel

- Author: Carol Shields, Patrick Crowe and Willow Dawson
- Illustrator: Selena Goulding
- Language: English
- Genre: History
- Publisher: Second Story Press
- Publication date: April 12, 2016
- Publication place: Canada
- Pages: 142
- ISBN: 978-1-77260-003-2
- OCLC: 933542229

Susanna Moodie: Roughing it in the Bush is a Graphic novel written by Carol Shields and Patrick Crowe, adapted by Willow Dawson, and is illustrated by Selena Goulding. The graphic novel was initially written as a Screenplay by Carol Shields and Patrick Crowe but was adapted by Crowe and Willow Dawson after Shields's death. Crowe contributes this enthusiasm to adapt the work to the increased popularity of graphic novels. The graphic novel is a loose adaptation of the novel by Susanna Moodie, Roughing it in the Bush, and describes the life of Susanna and how she came to write the novel, as well as her life after Roughing it in the Bush was published.

The Graphic Novel was nominated for the Best Books for Kids and Teens award by the Canadian Children's Book Centre.

== Background ==
Carol Shields's literature was heavily influenced by Susanna Moodie, with her first novel Small Ceremonies being based on a thesis written about Moodie. She continued to produce works based on Moodie, including Susanna Moodie: Voice and Vision. Shields worked on several plays and films over her lifetime, and met Patrick Crowe during her interview while he was filming The Enduring Enigma of Susanna Moodie. She later accepted an offer to write a film script for a film on the life of Susanna Moodie and contacted Crowe to help with the process.

After Shields's diagnosis of Cancer, production of the film ceased and production was halted for over a decade by Crowe after her death. He restarted the project after becoming interested in graphic novels and reached out to Don Shields to obtain the rights to the screenplay. Crowe contacted Willow Dawson to adapt the screenplay on a recommendation by Alex Jansen, the founder of the production company Pop Sanbox. The project was funded by the Canada Media Fund and received an initial C$178,850 commitment fund for development 2013, followed by a further C$540,000 to assist with production of the graphic novel.

== Plot ==
The graphic novel begins with Susanna's early life, briefly describing her middle-class childhood in England and showing her meeting her husband John Moodie, an officer in the British Army. Due to financial problems, the Moodies decided to emigrate to Canada, boarding a ship set for Quebec. The trip very quickly disillusioned Susanna from the experience of emigrating, not helped by her disdain for her fellow passengers

When they made landfall in Quebec, they were confined to Grosse Island in order to quarantine them and avoid the spread of Typhus and Cholera. The couple was disturbed by the mass graves that were easily visible on the island. When they eventually made it to their destination, close to the present day Peterborough, Ontario, they met the Indigenous people who lived on the nearby lake.

Shortly after arrival, the family's situation was made worse by the family's maid and indentured servant Hannah leaving in the middle of the night for other employment, breaking the contract they had signed to pay for her trip to Canada. Without their maid, Susanna is forced to provide for the local men who come for the logging bee. Susanna's sister, Catharine Parr Traill visits her a few months after Susanna's arrival and gifts Susanna a court dress, and also informs her of their mother's death.

On a winter's day, a former indentured servant named John Morgan arrives at The Moodie's door, begging for work after fleeing his previous master. John Moodie expresses jealousy at another man being in the house, but Susanna assuaged his fears by telling him they needed the help. Morgan and Susanna quickly became close, much to John's chagrin. when Susanna goes into labour, Morgan talks John through helping with the labour process, and Susanna successfully gives birth to Johnny Moodie. When word arrives of her sister Catharine's book about Canada, she is outraged by how picturesque the country is portrayed.

in 1837, the Patriot War breaks out and John is called back to serve as an officer in the British Army. Morgan and Susanna became closer as they struggle to make ends meet. Susanna also developed an Abscess, which has to be drained without anesthesia by the local doctor. In the middle of winter, a fire breaks out in the house, destroying it. Although the family all escaped unscathed, they lose all their savings. In the spring, John returns and takes Morgan aside to fire him without telling Susanna. One day, while walking along the riverbank, their young son Johnny falls into the river and drowns. After Johnny's death the family moves back into civilization. Susanna remarks how the seven years have made her appear double her age. When leaving the forest, she expresses regrets and feels she no longer fits into urban society.

After finally publishing her book Roughing it in the Bush, Susanna is able to live in relative comfort. The novel was extremely controversial and led to her being disowned by her family in England, at the behest of her sister, Agnes Strickland. In the final years of her life, Susanna visits her old cabin, by that point overgrown with weeds, to pay respects to Johnny's grave. The novel ends with an illustration of her younger self and her English home in the now-abandoned locket.

== Characters ==
- Susanna Moodie: An English author who emigrates to Canada in 1832 with her Husband and Daughter. She is the main character of the graphic novel, and it is written from her perspective.
- John Moodie: A former British Army officer. He marries Susanna after being introduced to her at a party. He finds adjusting to Canada harder than Susanna and frequently expresses jealousy towards John Morgan.
- John Morgan: A servant boy who serves the Moodie family for a number of years after being taken in by Susanna. It is implied he has romantic feelings for Susanna but does not act on them.
- Peter Nogan: An indigenous chief who often helps the Moodie Family during their stay in the Bush.
- Catharine Parr-Triall: Susanna's sister, who emigrates to Canada a few years after the Moodies. She writes a glowing review of the country, prompting Susanna to respond with her book Roughing it in the Bush.
- Jenny Buchanon: A "Rough" Irish maid who replaces their previous maids who both abandoned the family. She remains with the Moodie family until they leave for the city, and is described by Susanna as "invaluable"

== Reception ==
The book was published by Second Story Publishing in 2016. The book received positive reviews from critics. Veronica Strong-Boag stated that the book "provides a timely and haunting reminder that Canada still depends on adapting to, and sharing, a challenging environment."
