= Brent Carver =

Canadian actor (1951–2020)

- Born: November 17, 1951; Cranbrook, British Columbia, Canada
- Died: August 4, 2020 (aged 68); Cranbrook, British Columbia, Canada
- Occupation: Actor
- Years active: 1972–2020

Brent Carver (November 17, 1951 – August 4, 2020) was a Canadian actor best known internationally for performances in Kander and Ebb's Kiss of the Spider Woman. He played the central role of Molina in the premier production in Toronto (winning the Dora Award for best actor in a musical), in London's West End (nominated for an Olivier Award) and on Broadway for which he won the 1993 Tony Award for Best Actor in a Musical. A subsequent Broadway appearance in 1999 in Parade as Leo Frank, led to a second Tony nomination for Best Actor in a Musical. Most of his career, however, was spent on Canadian stages and in Canadian film and television, work which was greeted with much acclaim and many awards, including the Governor General's Performing Arts Award.

== Early life ==
Carver was born of Welsh and Irish heritage in Cranbrook, British Columbia, the son of Lois (Wills), a clerk, and Kenneth Carver, who was in the lumber business. He was the third of seven children, none of whom went into show business, apart from himself. He almost became a teacher, but continued participating in theatre. He attended the University of British Columbia from 1969 to 1972. He sang from an early age with his father, who played guitar. Carver's favourite actors were Spencer Tracy and Bette Davis.

== Career ==
Carver was known for a variety of stage and film roles, including The Wars, Lilies, Larry's Party, Elizabeth Rex, Millennium, Shadow Dancing, and Unidentified Human Remains and the True Nature of Love. Carver originated the role of Gandalf in the Toronto stage production of The Lord of the Rings and appeared in several Soulpepper Theatre Company productions such as The Wild Duck and Don Carlos.

Carver played the character Leo on the CBC TV series Leo and Me, which aired from 1977 to 1978, co-starring with Michael J. Fox.

In 1979 Carver made his U.S. debut in The Tempest, playing Ariel to Anthony Hopkins's Prospero. In 1982 Carver won the first of his four Dora Awards as Horst in Bent.

His stage work involved an extended association with Canada's Stratford Festival beginning in the 1980s, and continuing for more than thirty years, playing a wide array of Shakespeare roles, as well as appearing in several notable musical productions including the Pirate King in the 1985 production of The Pirates of Penzance, and in 2000 as Tevye in Fiddler on the Roof.

In 1992, Carver originated the role of Molina in Kander and Ebb's Kiss of the Spider Woman when it premiered at the St. Lawrence Centre for the Arts in Toronto. He played the role again at the Shaftesbury Theatre in London's West End, where he was nominated for the Laurence Olivier Award, and again when the show moved to Broadway in 1993, where he won a Tony Award for his performance, as well as a Drama Desk Award. He dedicated his Tony win to the late Canadian actress Susan Wright, who had died two years earlier in a fire in his Stratford Ontario house.

In 1998 Carver returned to Broadway and was nominated for a second Tony Award for his portrayal of Leo Frank in Jason Robert Brown and Alfred Uhry's musical Parade. He was awarded a Drama Desk Award for the same role.

Carver portrayed Ichabod Crane in the 1999 TV film The Legend of Sleepy Hollow which aired on Odyssey. He played the title role in "The Trouble with Harry", an episode of the television series Twice in a Lifetime. He portrayed Leonardo da Vinci in Leonardo: A Dream of Flight in 2002.

In 2003, Carver appeared in the Off-Broadway production of My Life With Albertine at Playwrights Horizons, where he portrayed older Marcel and the Narrator. The production received a nomination for the Drama League Award as Distinguished Production of a Musical.

In May 2014, Carver received a Governor General's Performing Arts Award, Canada's highest honour in the performing arts, for his lifetime contribution to Canadian theatre.

In 2016, Carver performed in a musical show titled Walk Me to the Corner at the Harold Green Jewish Theatre Company in Toronto.

=== Death ===
Carver died on August 4, 2020, at the age of 68 at home in Cranbrook. The cause of his death was not made public.

== Credits ==
=== Filmography ===
- The Beachcombers (1972, TV Series)
- Inside Canada (1974, TV Series)
- One Night Stand (1978, TV Movie) as Rafe
- Leo and Me (1978, TV Series) as Leo
- Crossbar (1979, TV Movie) as Aaron Kornylo
- The Wars (1983) as Robert Ross
- Cross Country (1983) as John Forrest
- Anne's Story (1984, TV Movie)
- Love and Larceny (1985, TV Movie) as Charles Chadwick
- The Pirates of Penzance (1985, TV Movie) as Pirate King
- All for One (1985, TV Movie)
- Adderly (1987, TV Series)
- Much Ado About Nothing (1987, TV Movie) as Don John
- Spies, Lies & Naked Thighs (1988, TV Movie) as Gunther
- Shadow Dancing (1988) as Alexei
- The Twilight Zone (1989, TV Series) as Josef
- War of the Worlds (1989, TV Series) as Jesse
- Millennium (1989) as Coventry
- Love and Hate: The Story of Colin and JoAnn Thatcher (1989, TV Movie) as Tony Merchant
- Street Legal (1989-1994, TV Series) as Scott Farrow #2 / Arthur Fraticelli
- The Hidden Room (1991, TV Series)
- The Shower (1992) as Kevin
- The Song Spinner (1995, TV Movie) as Selmo
- Lilies (1996) as Countess de Tilly
- Margie Gillis: Wild Hearts in Strange Times (1996) as Singer / Dancer
- Leonardo: A Dream of Flight (1996, TV Movie) as Leonardo DaVinci
- Whiskers (1997, TV Movie) as Whiskers
- Due South (1997, TV Series) as Bruce Spender
- Balls Up (1997, TV Movie) as Geoff
- L'histoire de l'Oie (1998, TV Movie) as Maurice (English version)
- The Legend of Sleepy Hollow (1999, TV Movie) as Ichabod Crane
- Twice in a Lifetime (2000, TV Series) as Harry
- Deeply (2000) as Porter
- The City (2000, TV Series) as Sam
- Ararat (2002) as Philip
- The Event (2003) as Brian Knight
- Elizabeth Rex (2004, TV Movie) as Ned Lowenscroft
- This Is Wonderland (2005, TV Series)
- Prairie Giant: The Tommy Douglas Story (2006, TV Mini-Series) as Secretary Balsam
- Lightchasers (2007, Short) as Man
- Romeo and Juliet (2014) as Friar Laurence
- The Whale (2014, Short) as Ryley Crewson

=== Theatre ===
- Jacques Brel Is Alive and Well and Living in Paris (1972, Vancouver Arts Club Theatre)
- Much Ado About Nothing (1973, Edmonton Citadel Theatre, as Claudio)
- Kronborg: 1582 (1975, Eastern Canada Tour, as Hamlet)
- Romeo and Juliet (1976, Edmonton Citadel Theatre, as Romeo)
- Rocky Horror Show (1976, Toronto Ryerson Theatre, as Dr. Frank-N-Furter)
- Twelfth Night (1977, Edmonton Citadel Theatre, as Feste)
- Foxfire (1979, Stratford Festival, as Dillard)
- The Tempest (1979, Los Angeles Mark Taper Forum, as Ariel)
- Long Day's Journey Into Night (1980, Stratford Festival, as Edmund Tyrone)
- Bent (1981, Toronto Bathurst Street Theatre, Dora Mavor Moore Award for Best Actor, as Horst)
- Pirates of Penzance (1985, Stratford Festival, as The Pirate King)
- Hamlet (1986, Stratford Festival, as Hamlet)
- Rosencrantz and Guildenstern Are Dead (1986, Stratford Festival, as Hamlet)
- Cabaret (1987, Stratford Festival, as The Emcee)
- Much Ado About Nothing (1987, Stratford Festival, as Don John)
- Unidentified Human Remains and the True Nature of Love (1990, Toronto Crow's Theatre, Dora Award for Best Actor, as David)
- The Importance of Being Earnest (1990, Toronto Canadian Stage Company, as Jack Worthing)
- Kiss of the Spider Woman (1992, Toronto, Dora Award for Best Actor; 1992 London West End; 1993 Broadway, Tony Award for Best Actor in a Musical)
- Cyrano de Bergerac (1994, Edmonton Citadel Theatre, as Cyrano)
- Richard II (1995, Edmonton Citadel Theatre, as Richard)
- High Life (1996/97, Toronto World Stage Festival, Dora Award for Best Actor, as Donnie)
- Don Carlos (1998, Toronto Soulpepper, as Don Carlos)
- Parade (1998–1999, New York Lincoln Center, as Leo Frank)
- Fiddler on the Roof (2000, Stratford Festival, as Tevye)
- Elizabeth Rex' (2000, Stratford Festival, as Ned)
- Larry's Party (musical) (2001, Toronto CanStage, as Larry)
- My Life With Albertine (2003, New York Playwrights Horizons, as older Marcel and Narrator)
- Vigil (play) (2004, Toronto CanStage, as Kemp)
- King Lear (2004, Stratford Festival; New York Lincoln Center, as Edgar)
- The Wild Duck (2005, Toronto Soulpepper, as Gregors)
- The Story of My Life (musical) (2006, Toronto CanStage)
- Lord of the Rings (2006, Toronto Princess of Wales Theatre, as Gandalf)
- The Elephant Man (2007, Toronto CanStage, as John Merrick)
- As You Like It (2010, Stratford Festival, as Jacques)
- Jacques Brel Is Alive and Well and Living in Paris (2010, Stratford Festival)
- Camelot (2011, Stratford Festival, as Merlin and Pellinore)
- Jesus Christ Superstar (2011, Stratford Festival, as Pilate)
- Romeo and Juliet (2013, Broadway, as Friar Laurence)
- The Winter's Tale (2013, Princeton McCarter Theater, as Camillo)
- Company (2014, Toronto Theatre 20, as Harry)
- Glenn (2014, Toronto Soulpepper, as older Glenn Gould)
- Evangeline (2015, Edmonton Citadel Theatre, as Father Felician)
- The Winter's Tale (2016/2017, Toronto, as Autolycus and Antigonous)
- Measure for Measure (2016, Toronto, as Lucio)
- Walk Me To The Corner (2016, Toronto)
- Twelfth Night (2017, Stratford Festival, as Feste)
- The School for Scandal (2017, Stratford Festival, as Rowley)
