= Swann (film) =

- Canadian theatrical release poster
- Directed by: Anna Benson Gyles
- Written by: David Young
- Based on: Swann: A Mystery by Carol Shields
- Produced by: Christina Jennings; Ann Scott
- Starring: Brenda Fricker; Miranda Richardson; Michael Ontkean; David Cubitt; Sean McCann
- Cinematography: Gerald Packer
- Edited by: Robin Sales
- Music by: Richard Rodney Bennett
- Production companies: Shaftesbury Films; Greenpoint Films
- Distributed by: Norstar Releasing
- Release date: September 11, 1996 (TIFF)
- Running time: 96 minutes
- Country: Canada
- Language: English

Swann is a 1996 Canadian drama film directed by Anna Benson Gyles and starring Miranda Richardson and Brenda Fricker. The film is an adaptation of the Carol Shields novel Swann: A Mystery, which was itself inspired by the real-life murder of poet Pat Lowther.

The film premiered as a gala at the 1996 Toronto International Film Festival.

== Plot ==
Rose Hindmarch is a small town librarian whose life is significantly changed when Sarah Maloney, a famous author and academic, arrives in town to research a new book about the long-ago murder of local poet Mary Swann.

== Cast ==
- Brenda Fricker as Rose Hindmarch
- Miranda Richardson as Sarah Maloney
- Michael Ontkean as Stephen
- David Cubitt as Brownie
- Sean McCann as Homer
- John Neville as Cruzzi

== Award nominations ==
The film garnered five Genie Award nominations at the 17th Genie Awards in 1996:

- Best Actress: Brenda Fricker
- Best Supporting Actor: Sean McCann
- Best Art Direction/Production Design: John Dondertman
- Best Costume Design: Elisbetta Beraldo
- Best Original Score: Richard Rodney Bennett

It did not win any of the awards.
