= The Stone Diaries =

1993 novel by Carol Shields

- First Canadian edition
- Author: Carol Shields
- Cover artist: Andrea Pinnington (design); David Purdie (photography)
- Language: English
- Publisher: Random House of Canada
- Publication date: 1993
- Publication place: Canada
- Pages: 361 pp
- ISBN: 0-394-22362-4
- OCLC: 28022123

The Stone Diaries is a 1993 novel by Canadian author Carol Shields.

== Plot summary ==
The book is the fictional autobiography of Daisy Goodwill Flett, a seemingly ordinary woman whose life is marked by death and loss from the beginning, when her mother dies during childbirth. Through marriage and motherhood, Daisy struggles to understand the paradoxes of her life. The book is divided into ten chapters detailing each epoch of Daisy's life.

=== Birth, 1905 ===
Daisy Goodwill is born to Mercy Stone and Cuyler Goodwill in the summer of 1905. Mercy is an obese woman who loves to cook, eat, and keep house. Cuyler is a short, love-starved mason who worships his wife. Mercy dies of eclampsia shortly after giving birth, and for the first eleven years of her life Daisy is left to the care of her neighbour, Mrs. Clarentine Flett.

=== Childhood, 1916 ===
Daisy is raised by her neighbour "Aunt Clarentine" and her neighbour's adult son "Uncle Barker" in Winnipeg. Mrs. Flett corresponds regularly with Daisy's father. That year Mrs. Flett is struck and killed by a speeding cyclist, and Daisy eventually goes to live with her estranged father in Indiana while Barker moves to Ottawa.

=== Marriage, 1927 ===
Daisy marries Harold Hoad, a university dropout and alcoholic. He arrives drunk to their wedding and only stops drinking while seasick on their journey to honeymoon in Paris. Harold indulges in increasingly reckless behaviour before he falls to his death from a second story window. Their marriage is never consummated.

=== Love, 1936 ===
Daisy has spent the last nine years living with her father and his new bride, Maria. After revealing to her friends that she feels stifled, Daisy takes the train to Ottawa, stopping to see Niagara Falls and the Dionne quintuplets along the way. Barker eagerly awaits Daisy's arrival, admitting to himself that he has been in love with her for decades. They quickly marry, much to the shock of all their acquaintances.

=== Motherhood, 1947 ===
Daisy Flett is now the mother of Alice, Warren, and Joan. Barker, now sixty-five, worries what to do with his time after he retires. Brief accounts are made of the children and Daisy's home life. Barker's father moves back to his boyhood home in the Orkney Islands.

=== Work, 1955-1964 ===
This chapter is composed entirely of letters from other people writing to Daisy. Barker Flett dies of a malignant brain tumor at the age of seventy two. Niece Beverley, a former WREN in World War II, comes to live in Ottawa after getting pregnant. Daisy takes over her late husband's gardening column in the local paper as "Mrs. Green Thumb" and her oldest daughter goes off to college. Cuyler Goodwill dies and his widow Maria disappears. Daisy visits her two childhood friends 'Fraidy' and 'Beans' and dates her editor Jay Dudley until he callously informs her that her gardening column has been taken over by a full-timer.

=== Sorrow, 1965 ===
After her job is taken over by someone else Daisy falls into a deep depression, punctuated by fits of rage, unable to get out of bed or take care of herself, although she seems to know that this will eventually pass. Every person in Daisy's life posits their own theory of her condition.

=== Ease, 1977 ===
With all of Daisy's children grown up and starting their own families Daisy moves to Sarasota, Florida to be near her childhood friends. Beverly's daughter, Victoria, has visited her great-aunt at least once a year, and proposes they visit the Orkney Islands with her college instructor. In Orkney they come across Mr. Flett, now 115 years old and barely cognizant.

=== Illness and Decline, 1985 ===
In her eightieth year Daisy suffers a serious heart attack in her home, the fall shattering her kneecaps beyond repair. Her childhood friends have predeceased her. She is able to maintain a small social circle at the hospital but is eventually moved to a long-term care facility since she can no longer walk. With little to do she spends most of her time reminiscing.

=== Death (199-) ===
After multiple strokes and another heart attack Daisy dies. The year is never revealed, so she could have lived to her nineties. This final chapter is punctuated with lists of things from Daisy's life, as well as brief conversations between her children and other relatives. The book ends with someone remarking there should have been daisies at the funeral.

== Background ==
The title of the book might have been inspired by Pat Lowther's poetry collection A Stone Diary (1977). Lowther's murder in 1975 was the inspiration for Shields' earlier novel Swann: A Mystery (1987).

Part of the setting for the book is the historic Vinegar Hill neighborhood of Bloomington, Indiana.

== Critical reception ==
Kirkus Reviews wrote: "Shields, who began as a miniaturist, has come full bloom with this latest exploration of domestic plenitude and paucity; she's entered a mature, luminous period, devising a style that develops an earlier whimsical fabulism into a hard-edged lyricism perfect for the ambitious bicultural exploration she undertakes here."

== Awards and nominations ==
The Stone Diaries, Shields' best-known novel, won the 1993 Governor General's Award for English language fiction in Canada and the 1995 Pulitzer Prize for Fiction in the United States. As an American-born naturalized Canadian, Shields was eligible for both awards; it is currently the only novel ever to have won both awards. It also received the National Book Critics Circle Award and was nominated for the Booker Prize.

== Bibliography ==
Although Stone Diaries has been reprinted many times, the first Canadian edition is still not common in the used/rare book field. The first edition was published by Random House of Canada. The copyright page makes no statement of first edition, nor does it contain a number row. However, later printings are always noted. In other words, the first edition can be identified by the absence of a statement of reprint.
