= Winifred Merrill =

Winifred Merrill may refer to:

- Winifred Edgerton Merrill (1862–1951), mathematician and astronomer, the first American woman to receive a PhD in mathematics
- Winifred Merrill Warren (1898–1990), American violinist and music educator
