= List of awards and nominations received by Michael J. Fox =

Michael J. Fox awards and nominations
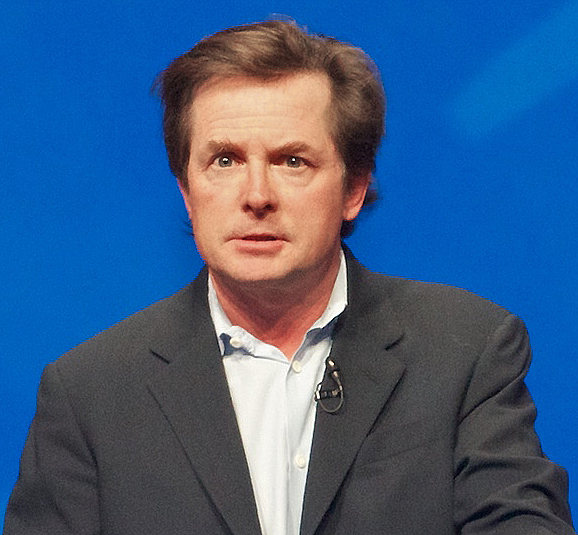
- Fox in 2012
Awards and nominations
Award	Wins	Nominations
Academy Awards	1	1
Emmy Awards	5	18
Golden Globe Awards	4	10
Grammy Awards	1	2
Screen Actors Guild Awards	2	2

Michael J. Fox is an activist and actor. Throughout his career Fox won five Emmy Awards, four Golden Globe Awards, two Screen Actors Guild Awards, and a Grammy Award. He was also appointed an Officer of the Order of Canada in 2010, and promoted to Companion in 2026 for his outspoken advocacy for Parkinson's Disease. He was inducted to Canada's Walk of Fame in 2000 and the Hollywood Walk of Fame in 2002. For his advocacy of a cure for Parkinson's disease he received the Jean Hersholt Humanitarian Award from the Academy of Motion Pictures Arts and Sciences in 2022.

He is perhaps best known for his leading role as Marty McFly in the Back to the Future trilogy (1985–1990) as well as Alex P. Keaton on the NBC sitcom Family Ties (1982–1989) and ABC sitcom Spin City Mike Flaherty (1996–2000). He has made numerous appearances on television including FX comedy-drama Rescue Me (2009) and the CBS legal drama The Good Wife (2010–2016), the HBO comedy series Curb Your Enthusiasm (2011), and the CBS spinoff The Good Fight (2020). Fox officially retired in 2021 due to his declining health. He appeared in a 2025 episode of Shrinking.

== Major associations ==
=== Academy Awards ===
Year	Category	Nominated work	Result	Ref.
2023	Jean Hersholt Humanitarian Award		Honored	

=== Emmy Awards ===
Year	Category	Nominated work	Result	Ref.
Primetime Emmy Awards
1985	Outstanding Supporting Actor in a Comedy Series	Family Ties	Nominated	
1986	Outstanding Lead Actor in a Comedy Series	Family Ties	Won	
1987	Outstanding Lead Actor in a Comedy Series	Family Ties	Won	
1988	Outstanding Lead Actor in a Comedy Series	Family Ties	Won	
1989	Outstanding Lead Actor in a Comedy Series	Family Ties	Nominated	
1997	Outstanding Lead Actor in a Comedy Series	Spin City	Nominated	
1998	Outstanding Lead Actor in a Comedy Series	Spin City	Nominated	
1999	Outstanding Lead Actor in a Comedy Series	Spin City	Nominated	
2000	Outstanding Lead Actor in a Comedy Series	Spin City	Won	
2006	Outstanding Guest Actor in a Drama Series	Boston Legal (Season 2)	Nominated	
2009	Outstanding Nonfiction Special	Michael J. Fox: Adventures Of An Incurable Optimist	Nominated	
2009	Outstanding Guest Actor in a Drama Series	Rescue Me (episode: "Sheila")	Won	
2011	Outstanding Guest Actor in a Drama Series	The Good Wife	Nominated	
2012	Outstanding Guest Actor in a Drama Series	The Good Wife	Nominated	
2012	Outstanding Guest Actor in a Comedy Series	Curb Your Enthusiasm (episode: "Larry vs. Michael J. Fox")	Nominated	
2013	Outstanding Guest Actor in a Drama Series	The Good Wife	Nominated	
2015	Outstanding Guest Actor in a Drama Series	The Good Wife	Nominated	
2016	Outstanding Guest Actor in a Drama Series	The Good Wife	Nominated	
2026	Outstanding Guest Actor in a Comedy Series	Shrinking (episode: "The Field")	Nominated	
2026	Bob Hope Humanitarian Award		Honored	

=== Golden Globe Awards ===
Year	Category	Nominated work	Result	Ref.
1986	Best Actor in a Motion Picture – Comedy or Musical	Back to the Future	Nominated	
1986	Best Actor in a Television Series – Comedy or Musical	Family Ties	Nominated	
1987	Best Actor in a Television Series – Comedy or Musical	Family Ties	Nominated	
1988	Best Actor in a Television Series – Comedy or Musical	Family Ties	Nominated	
1989	Best Actor in a Television Series – Comedy or Musical	Family Ties	Won	
1997	Best Actor in a Television Series – Comedy or Musical	Spin City	Nominated	
1998	Best Actor in a Television Series – Comedy or Musical	Spin City	Won	
1999	Best Actor in a Television Series – Comedy or Musical	Spin City	Won	
2000	Best Actor in a Television Series – Comedy or Musical	Spin City	Won	
2014	Best Actor in a Television Series – Comedy or Musical	The Michael J. Fox Show	Nominated	

=== Grammy Awards ===
Year	Category	Nominated work	Result	Ref.
2010	Best Spoken Word Album	Always Looking Up	Won	
2027	Best Audio Book, Narration & Storytelling Recording	Future Boy	Pending	

=== Screen Actors Guild Award ===
Year	Category	Nominated work	Result	Ref.
1999	Outstanding Actor in a Comedy Series	Spin City	Won	
2000	Outstanding Actor in a Comedy Series	Spin City	Won	

== Miscellaneous awards ==
=== Aftonbladet TV Prize Awards ===
Year	Category	Nominated work	Result	Ref.
2001	Best Foreign Television Personality – Male	Spin City	Won	

=== American Comedy Awards ===
Year	Category	Nominated work	Result	Ref.
1996	Funniest Supporting Actor in a Motion Picture	The American President	Nominated	
1999	Funniest Male Performer in a Television Series	Spin City	Nominated	
2000	Funniest Male Performer in a Television Series	Spin City	Nominated	

=== Bravo Otto Awards ===
Year	Category	Nominated work	Result	Ref.
1985	Best Actor	Family Ties	Won	

=== Critics Choice Television Awards ===
Year	Category	Nominated work	Result	Ref.
2016	Best Guest Performer in a Drama Series	The Good Wife	Nominated	

=== Jupiter Awards ===
Year	Category	Nominated work	Result	Ref.
1985	Best International Actor	Back to the Future	Won	

=== Nickelodeon Kids' Choice Awards ===
Year	Category	Nominated work	Result	Ref.
1988	Favorite Television Actor	Family Ties	Won	
1989	Favorite Television Actor	Family Ties	Nominated	
1990	Favorite Movie Actor	Back to the Future Part II	Won	
1997	Favorite Television Actor	Spin City	Nominated	
2000	Favorite Television Actor	Spin City	Nominated	
2000	Favorite Voice from an Animated Movie	Stuart Little	Nominated	

=== People's Choice Awards ===
Year	Category	Nominated work	Result	Ref.
1986	Favorite Male Television Performer	Family Ties	Nominated	
1987	Favorite Male Television Performer	Family Ties	Nominated	
1988	Favorite Male Television Performer	Family Ties	Nominated	
1989	Favorite Male Television Performer	Family Ties	Nominated	
1997	Favorite Male Television Performer in a New Series	Spin City	Won	
1997	Favorite Male Television Performer	Spin City	Nominated	
1998	Favorite Male Television Performer	Spin City	Nominated	
1999	Favorite Male Television Performer	Spin City	Nominated	
2012	Favorite Television Guest Star	The Good Wife	Nominated	
2014	Favorite Actor in a New Television Series	The Michael J. Fox Show	Nominated	

=== Satellite Awards ===
Year	Category	Nominated work	Result	Ref.
1997	Best Actor in a Series – Comedy or Musical	Spin City	Nominated	
1998	Best Actor in a Series – Comedy or Musical	Spin City	Nominated	
1999	Best Actor in a Series – Comedy or Musical	Spin City	Nominated	

=== Saturn Awards ===
Year	Category	Nominated work	Result	Ref.
1986	Best Actor	Back to the Future	Won	
1997	Best Actor	The Frighteners	Nominated	

=== TV Guide Awards ===
Year	Category	Nominated work	Result	Ref.
1999	Favorite Actor in a Comedy	Spin City	Nominated	
2000	Favorite Actor in a Comedy	Spin City	Nominated	

=== TV Land Awards ===
Year	Category	Nominated work	Result	Ref.
2007	Break Up That Was So Bad It Was Good (shared with Courteney Cox)	Family Ties	Nominated	
2008	Character You'd Pay to Do Your Homework for You	Family Ties	Won	

=== Viewers for Quality Television Awards ===
Year	Category	Nominated work	Result	Ref.
1986	Best Supporting Actor in a Quality Comedy Series	Family Ties	Won	
1987	Best Actor in a Quality Comedy Series	Family Ties	Won	
