= Unless =

2002 novel by Carol Shields

- First edition cover
- Author: Carol Shields
- Language: English
- Publisher: HarperCollins
- Publication date: April 30, 2002
- Publication place: Canada
- Media type: Print (Hardback & Paperback)
- Pages: 224 pp
- ISBN: 978-0-00-714107-4
- OCLC: 48884303
- Dewey Decimal: 813/.6 21
- LC Class: PR9199.3.S514 U55 2002

Unless is the final novel by Canadian writer Carol Shields, first published by Fourth Estate, an imprint of HarperCollins in 2002. Semi-autobiographical, it was the capstone to Shields's writing career: she died shortly after its publication in 2003. The work was widely acclaimed and nominated for the Booker Prize, the Giller Prize, the Governor General's Award, the Orange Prize for Fiction, and received the Ethel Wilson Fiction Prize. In 2011, it was a finalist in the Canada Reads competition, where it was defended by actor Lorne Cardinal. Like many of her works (especially The Stone Diaries), Unless explores the extraordinary that lies within the ordinary lives of ordinary women.

The novel is narrated in first person by 44-year-old writer and translator, Reta Winters. The book proceeds as a linear series of reflections by Reta, elliptically coming to the thematic center of the story: the seemingly arbitrary decision of Reta's college-aged daughter Norah to drop out of university and live on the street with a cardboard sign affixed to her chest that reads "Goodness". Although the novel does not in any way proceed like a mystery, the reasons for Norah's departure from the normal world are Reta's primary motivation in writing. In parallel, her relationship with her French mentor (a Holocaust survivor and poet) drives much of her narration and view of herself.

The novel deals extensively with the role of women and in particular, women's literature. Late in the novel, Reta starts to break from herself and write in character as a disenfranchised female writer. The underlying theme is that the lives of women are underwritten, ignored, and dealt with as "trivial" by the literary establishment. The novel also functions largely as an investigation into the role of writing in general (independent of gender). Reta's grief over her daughter's state makes her very inwardly focussed on the process of writing. A reflection of this is shown in the title of the book and the chapter titles. "Unless" and the chapter titles ("therefore", "else", "instead") are all words that are used to couch the fragmented manner in which life fits together. As Shields writes, "A life is full of isolated events, but these events, if they are to form a coherent narrative, require odd pieces of language to link them together, little chips of grammar (mostly adverbs or prepositions) that are hard to define [...] words like therefore, else, other, also, thereof, therefore, instead, otherwise, despite, already, and not yet."

The novel was adapted into the 2016 film Unless, which stars Catherine Keener as Reta and Hannah Gross as Norah.

== Reception ==
On November 5, 2019, the BBC News listed Unless on its list of the 100 most influential novels.
