= Swann: A Mystery =

Novel by Carol Shields

- Cover of Swann: A Mystery First edition
- Author: Carol Shields
- Language: English
- Genre: Novel
- Published: 1987
- Publication place: Canada
- Media type: Print
- Awards: Crime Writers of Canada Award for Best Novel (1988)
- ISBN: 1480459844

Swann: A Mystery is a novel by Carol Shields that details the impact of an obscure Canadian poet, Mary Swann, upon four individuals: a feminist literary critic, the poet's biographer, a small-town librarian, and a crusty, brilliant newspaper editor. The book is divided into five sections, the first four each centering one of the characters, and the last detailing (in screenplay format) what happens when all congregate for a conference on Swann.

First published by Stoddart Publishing in 1987, the novel was inspired by the 1975 murder of Canadian poet Pat Lowther.

In 1988, it won the Crime Writers of Canada Award for Best Novel.

== Film, TV or theatrical adaptations ==
The novel served as the basis of a 1996 feature film, Swann, directed by Anna Benson Gyles and starring Miranda Richardson, Brenda Fricker, Sean McCann, Michael Ontkean and John Neville. Written by David Young, it was nominated for five Genie Awards.
