= Leo and Me =

Canadian television sitcom

- Created by: Merv Campone
- Starring: Michael J. Fox; Brent Carver; Charles W. Gray
- Country of origin: Canada
- No. of episodes: 12

Production
- Running time: approx. 30 min

Original release
- Network: CBC Television
- Release: January 5, 1978 – 1981

Leo and Me is a Canadian television sitcom that aired in 1978.

It starred a 16-year-old Michael J. Fox playing Jamie, the 12-year-old younger nephew of Leo (Brent Carver).

Leo and Me was produced by Don Eccleston, directed by Don S. Williams and written by Marc and Susan Strange.

== Synopsis ==
Leo (Brent Carver) is a carefree, hard-living Italian adventurer who has won a large, decrepit yacht in a poker game, and has taken his orphaned nephew Jamie (Michael J. Fox) to live with him. Leo and Jamie live on the yacht moored in the harbour. Leo's charm and good luck guide him through tricky but humorous situations, and his young sidekick's adept mind helps the pair get out of trouble.

== Parkinson's disease ==
In 2002, an investigation was launched into Leo and Me after a possible cluster of Parkinson's disease cases was noted among former cast and crew members of the show. Fox and director Don Williams were among the four with the disease, along with a writer and a cameraman.

When asked about the cluster by Howard Stern in a September 25, 2013, interview on The Howard Stern Show, Michael J. Fox stated, "Believe it or not, from a scientific point of view, that's not significant." Donald Calne, a Vancouver neurologist, said the incidence of Parkinson's in society is about 1 in 300, but that four of the 125 people on the Vancouver set of Leo and Me developed the disease. Calne said, "It could be coincidence. But it's intriguing, it might be something they were exposed to."
