= Keith Harrison =

Canadian novelist (1945–2019)

John Keith Harrison (June 18, 1945 – April 10, 2019) was a Canadian novelist. He published five novels.

== Early life and education ==
Harrison was born in Vancouver, British Columbia, Canada. His education included an English degree from the University of British Columbia in 1967, a Master of Arts from University of California, Berkeley in 1968, and a Ph.D. from McGill University in 1972, in which he focused on the literature of Malcolm Lowry.

== Writing and teaching career ==
Harrison taught in the English department at Dawson College in Montreal, Quebec, and was chair of the creative writing department at Malaspina University-College in Nanaimo. He continued to teach at the same institution, which became Vancouver Island University.

His novels include Eyemouth (1990), a story of four characters from a Scottish fishing village around the turn of the 19th century. Told entirely in the form of letters, the novel was a finalist for the QSPELL Awards, which recognize books written by English-speaking Quebec residents. Furry Creek, his 1999 "true-life novel", recounts the story of the murder of British Columbia poet Pat Lowther. In a generally positive review, writer Mark Anthony Jarman said, "The best parts of Furry Creek ... are fascinating and evocative ... Lowther's troubled shadow looms behind the text ... This is a kind of magic trick on the part of Keith Harrison, a labour of love, a monument to a writer's memory ..." It was nominated for the Ethel Wilson Fiction Prize.

He edited the 2001 anthology Islands West, a compilation of short stories authored by writers from the west coast of Canada.

Harrison lived on Hornby Island with his wife, JoAnn, whom he had known since elementary school. He died on April 10, 2019.

== Novels ==
- Dead Ends (1981)
- After Six Days (1985)
- Eyemouth (1990)
- Furry Creek (1999)
- Elliot & Me (2006)
