= Dressing Up for the Carnival =

2000 short story collection by Carol Shields

- First edition (publ. Random House Canada)
- Author: Carol Shields
- Publisher: Random House Canada
- Publication date: April 24, 2000
- ISBN: 978-0-670-88921-1

Dressing Up for the Carnival is a short story collection published in 2000 by Canadian author Carol Shields, which depicts 12 characters who live their lives through illusions. The Carnival is a metaphor for life, and "dressing up" represents the stigmas each of the characters try to fit into.

== Characters ==
Characters are listed in order of appearance:

- Tamara loves dressing up. She is a clerk-receptionist for the Youth Employment Bureau where she lives.
- Roger is 30 years old, and is of medium height. He is described to us as a burly divorcee. Roger is employed by the Gas Board in the place where he lives. In the story he is described as holding a mango and going to work, and while he is doing so, he is creating symbols.
- Sisters Karen and Sue Borden arrived back in town approximately a month ago from their skiing trip in Happy Valley. The Borden sisters both look and express the fact that they have recently been skiing. Much attention in this story is paid to the tags on the Borden sisters jackets that read: "I SKIED HAPPY MOUNTAIN".
- Wanda, an awkward woman who works at a bank under the supervision of Mr. Wishcourt, the bank manager. Mr. Wishcourt has recently had a baby boy, for whom he buys a baby carriage. Mr. Wishcourt asks Wanda to take the baby carriage to his house during work, because it will not fit in the back of his car. Wanda agrees, and while she is taking the carriage to Mr. Wishcourt's house, she feels as if she and the carriage are a single entity.
