= Gregor M. Robinson =

Canadian economist and author (born 1946)

Gregor Robinson
- Born: November 23, 1946 (age 79); Canada
- Died: 10 November 2026 (aged 79); Toronto, Canada
- Education: University of Toronto, London School of Economics
- Website: https://www.gregorrobinson.com

Gregor Robinson (born November 23, 1946, died Nov 10, 2026) was a Canadian economist and author. He was former chief economist at Insurance Bureau of Canada. He served as Vice-President, Policy & Economic Analysis, for the Ontario Energy Association from 2006 to 2011.

Robinson completed his B.A. in Economics at the University of Toronto in 1969 before graduating from London School of Economics (LSE) with a Masters in Economics in 1971.

His novels and short stories were published by Raincoast Books (Hotel Paradiso, 2000), Dundurn Press (Providence Island, 2011), Beach Holme Publishing (1997 The Dream King). Robinson's plays were performed at Toronto Fringe Festival in 2006 (Sweet Jane & Free, Has a Weapon), which were directed by Colleen Williams and Alex Fallis and in 2009 (Bad Skater, Good Hands) with Sean McCann (actor)

He was nominated for the Journey Prize three times, runner-up once, with a story in the Journey Prize Anthology (1997), National Magazine Awards three times, winner once (honourable mention), runner-up once, nominated for best first mystery story Edgar Awards in the USA and Ellie Awards in Canada.
