= Larry's Party =

1997 novel by Carol Shields

- Cover to the first edition
- Author: Carol Shields
- Cover artist: Jonathan Howells
- Language: English
- Genre: Novel
- Publisher: Knopf Canada
- Publication date: 2 September 1997
- Publication place: Canada
- Media type: Print (Hardback & Paperback)
- Pages: 339 pp (hardback first edition)
- ISBN: 0-679-30877-6 (hardback first edition)
- OCLC: 37981919

Larry's Party is a 1997 novel by Carol Shields. There is an underlying theme of people retracing their steps, both literally and figuratively, and going down different routes to try to achieve fulfilment.

The novel examines the life of Larry Weller, an "ordinary man made extraordinary" by his unique talent for creating labyrinths. Shields' profound insights into human nature transform Larry from an ordinary, average man into a figure of universal humanity.

The novel won the 1998 Orange Prize for Fiction. In 2001, it was adapted into a musical by Richard Ouzounian and Marek Norman, which starred Brent Carver as Larry. It had its premiere at CanStage in Toronto, Ontario.

== Plot ==
In 1976, Larry Weller is twenty-six years old and employed as a florist in Winnipeg, Manitoba. He accidentally takes a stranger's identical Harris tweed jacket from a coffee shop. This prompts thoughts about his girlfriend Dorrie Shaw and his parents Stu and Dot.

In 1978, Larry marries Dorrie, and they honeymoon in the UK, where he discovers a love for garden mazes when he becomes lost in one. On his thirtieth birthday in 1980, Larry invites his family over for a picnic. He and Dorrie have bought a house and have a son, Ryan.

By 1983, Larry is spending all of his spare time working on a maze around his house, and it now takes up both the front and back yards. A frustrated Dorrie calls in a bulldozer to tear down the entire front section of the maze. This leads to the couple's divorce. Larry remarries, to a scholar of ancient Catholic saints, named Beth Prior. Their marriage is, for the most part, happy, though Larry realizes how much he loved Dorrie when they were married.

By 1988, Larry has moved to Chicago and become one of only a handful of professional maze designers in the world. He thinks back to the maze at his old house in Manitoba and how Dorrie is keeping what is left of it alive. Larry's father dies of colon cancer that year.

In 1991, Larry's son, Ryan, is twelve and visits him in Chicago. Ryan is a good artist and can speak French fluently. In 1992, Beth publishes her first book, and the couple begin to quarrel. In 1994, Larry wins the State of Illinois award for creative excellence for his mazes, but a few months later he and Beth are separated after she accepts a teaching position in the UK, and they get divorced.

In 1996, Larry collapses and falls into a coma for twenty-two days. Beth does not visit him, but Dorrie and Ryan do. The following year, Larry decides to throw a dinner party. He invites his friends, his girlfriend Charlotte, and both of his former wives. As the party is winding down, he experiences a vision of another reality in which he and Dorrie settled their quarrels and never divorced. Dorrie stays behind to help Larry clean up, Charlotte takes a liking to one of Larry's guests, and Beth recognises that Larry still loves Dorrie. Larry and Dorrie say they have always loved each other.

== Reception ==
In a starred review, Publishers Weekly discussed how the novel follows the protagonist "over five decades," through which "Shields observes the changing social conventions, gender roles, vernacular idiosyncracies and moral constructs of the times, interpolating these details into the narrative with subtle wit and an unerring eye for telling details. She also delineates the stages of life as the body ages and the future offers only the 'decline of limitless possibility,' while the mind hopes for the solace of some universal truths."

Kirkus Reviews highlighted how "each part is carefully related to the central metaphor of the garden mazes that Larry becomes expert at designing," though they noted that "the climactic chapter [...] is a blatantly contrived device—but successful in spite of its transparency." Kirkus concluded by calling the novel "very fine and real," saying, "Shields writes with the rare self-assurance of one who from the first knows where her characters are going and what will become of them once they arrive, and—rarer still—manages not to bend them out of shape along the way."

Booklist also reviewed the novel.
