= Inside Canada =

- Genre: Variety
- Written by: Pat Withrow
- Starring: Brent Carver (1974); Jim Martin (1973); Ruth Nichol; Pat Rose; Diane Stapley
- Country of origin: Canada
- Original language: English
- No. of seasons: 2

Production
- Producer: Dave Robertson
- Running time: 30 minutes

Original release
- Network: CBC Television
- Release: 16 July 1973 – 5 October 1974

Inside Canada is a Canadian variety television program that aired on CBC Television from 1973 to 1974.

== Premise ==
This Winnipeg-produced series began as a three-episode run in July 1973. Music was combined with comedy sequences with a Canadian focus. Reception to this initial run led to an eight-episode run a year later.

== Scheduling ==
This half-hour series was broadcast in the first season on Mondays at 7:30 p.m. (Eastern) from 16 to 30 July 1973, and in the second season on Saturdays at 10:00 p.m. from 13 July to 5 October 1974.
