= Sean McCann (actor) =

Canadian actor (1935–2019)

- Born: William Leonard Sean McCann; September 24, 1935; Windsor, Ontario, Canada
- Died: June 13, 2019 (aged 83); Toronto, Ontario, Canada
- Occupation: Actor
- Years active: 1961–2019
- Spouse: Andrée Paquet (m. 1968; his death 2019)
- Children: 5

William Leonard Sean McCann (September 24, 1935 – June 13, 2019) was a Canadian actor and was in the business for over 55 years. He was best known for his roles as Lt. Jim Hogan in the 1985 CTV television drama series Night Heat (1985–1989), Frank Rittenhauer in the comedy film Tommy Boy (1995) and the Judge in Chicago (2002).

A recipient of the Earle Grey Award for his lifetime achievement in television, Sean McCann appeared in over 150 movies, television programs and plays.

== Early life ==
McCann was born in Windsor, Ontario, on September 24, 1935, to Alta (née Tobin) and Jack McCann.

== Career ==
=== Notable roles and awards ===
McCann was in The Law of Enclosures, with Sarah Polley and Diane Ladd. He appeared with Meryl Streep (...First Do No Harm), Nick Nolte (Affliction) and Chris Farley (Tommy Boy). He shared screen time with Brenda Fricker and Miranda Richardson in Swann (for which McCann received a Best Performance by an Actor in a Supporting Role Genie nomination), Nicolas Cage in Trapped in Paradise, Kevin Bacon in The Air Up There, Sam Waterston in A House Divided, Peter Weller and Judy Davis in Naked Lunch (which garnered a National Film Critics Society award), Brooke Shields and the late Al Waxman in What Makes a Family, and Kurt Russell in Miracle. He appeared in the movie Hank Williams: The Show He Never Gave (made for Canadian TV, December, 1980).

In 1980, he starred in the second season of the nationally syndicated American situation comedy, The Baxters. On the series, McCann played Jim Baxter, a middle-class father of three children living in a suburb of St. Louis. Originally produced by Norman Lear in its first season, the series was the first "interactive sitcom" of its kind, wherein the first half of each 30-minute episode presented a vignette dramatizing the events in the lives of the Baxter family, and the second half was an "instant analysis" talk show segment, giving a live studio audience and guests an opportunity to express their opinions about the topic being presented that week.

In 1999, he won a Gemini Award for Best Guest Actor in a Series for Power Play. McCann was twice nominated for a Gemini Award for Best Performance in a Pre-School Series, for 1998's beloved Noddy as Grandpa Noah Tomten. McCann was singled out at the 1987 Gemini Awards with a Best Supporting Actor nomination for his recurring role in Night Heat. McCann also starred in Robert Lepage's Genie-award winning Possible Worlds, and appeared in the Golden Globe-nominated Small Sacrifices with Farrah Fawcett. In addition, McCann worked with such legendary directors as Sidney Lumet, Ken Russell, David Green, Paul Schrader and David Cronenberg.

In 1988, he took on a role he spoke of most fondly - Prime Minister William Lyon Mackenzie King in The King Chronicle. Directed by the renowned Canadian documentarian Donald Brittain, the mini-series was a 6-hour CBC and NFB co-production that aired to great popular and critical acclaim. One year later, McCann joined the ranks of such celebrated performers as Lorne Greene, Kate Reid and Gordon Pinsent, when he won the Earle Grey Award.

He also appeared in the Toronto Fringe Festival production of Bad Skater, Good Hands written by Gregor M. Robinson.

=== Other interests ===
McCann studied at St. Peter's Seminary in London, Ontario to prepare himself for the priesthood.

A baseball fan since the days of his youth, McCann served as an amateur Associate Scout with the Toronto Blue Jays since their early years, spoke often about baseball to professional organizations, and was named to the Board of Directors of the Canadian Baseball Hall of Fame.

McCann ran as an Ontario Liberal Party candidate in the 1977 Ontario general election, against Roy McMurtry in the electoral district of Eglinton.

== Personal life ==
From 1968 until his death in 2019, he was married to Andrée Paquet for 51 years, and he had five children.

=== Death ===
McCann died on June 13, 2019, in Toronto, Ontario, at the age of 83 from heart failure brought about by a heart disease he had suffered through most of his life.

== Filmography ==
=== Film ===
Year	Title	Role	Notes
1974	A Quiet Day in Belfast	Peter O'Lurgan	
1975	Sudden Fury	Polanski	
1976	The Far Shore	Cluny	
1977	The Uncanny	Inspector	Segment: "Hollywood 1936"
1977	Starship Invasions	Carl	
1978	Three Card Monte	Car Salesman	
1978	The Newcomers	McConnell	Episode "1847"
1979	Title Shot	Lieutenant Grace	
1980	Nothing Personal	Jake	
1980	Hog Wild	Colonel Warner	
1980	Atlantic City	Detective	Credited as Sean McCaan
1980	Hank Williams: The Show He Never Gave	Jack	
1981	Death Hunt	News Reporter	
1981	Tulips	Roger	
1981	Silence of the North	Man on Soup Line	
1982	I Know a Secret	Six-Toed Jimmy	Short film
1984	Hockey Night	Mr. Kozak	
1985	One Step Away	Building Manager	Short film
1986	The High Price of Passion	John Benedict	
1986	Flying	Jack Crew	
1986	In This Corner	Joe Dunne	
1988	Criminal Law	Jacob Fisher	
1994	The Air Up There	Ray Fox	
1994	Trapped in Paradise	Chief Bernie Burnell	
1994	Heritage Minutes: Agnes Macphail	The Warden	
1995	Tommy Boy	Frank Rittenhauer	
1995	Iron Eagle IV	Wilcox	
1996	Swann	Homer	
1997	Affliction	Evan Twombley	
1998	Simon Birch	Chief Al Cork	
1999	Woman Wanted	Kevin	
2000	Possible Worlds	Inspector Berkley	
2000	The Law of Enclosures	Hank	
2002	Chicago	Judge	
2004	Miracle	Walter Bush	
2005	The River King	Ernest Grey	
2012	Let the Daylight Into the Swamp	Donal St. Jules	
2014	The Big Fat Stone	Defense Lawyer Simon Trumble	
2015	No Deposit	Hostage Negotiator	
2017	Born Dead	Father McKenna	
2019	Goalie	Red Storey	
2021	Defining Moments	Shopkeeper	Final role

=== Television ===
Year	Title	Role	Notes
1975	Performance	Multiple	Episodes "The Middle Game", "The Captain of Köpenick"
1982	Off Your Rocker	Lou Carmen	Television movie
1985–89	Night Heat	Lieutenant Jim Hogan	96 episodes
1988	The King Chronicle	Mackenzie King	Miniseries
1989	Small Sacrifices	Russell Wells	Television movie
1991	Counterstrike	Captain Murphy	Episode: "Fire in the Streets"
1991	Scales of Justice	Malcolm Robb	Episode "Regina v Stewart"
1993	I'll Never Get to Heaven	John O'Doyle	
1994	Wild C.A.T.s: Covert Action Team	Marlowe (voice)	Episodes: "Pilot" and "Cry of the Coda"
1995–2001	Little Bear	Grandfather Bear (voice)	Appears in 18 episodes (22 segments); referenced in an additional 2 episodes (2 segments)
1996	Gang in Blue	Clute Mirkovich	Television movie
1998	Dogboys	Pappy	Television movie
1998	Evidence of Blood	Theodore Warfield	Television movie
1998–2000	The Noddy Shop	Noah Tomten	66 episodes Nominated - Gemini Award for Best Performance in a Pre-School Program or Series (1999); Nominated - Gemini Award for Best Performance in a Pre-School Program or Series (2000)
1998	Power Play	Ray Malone	3 episodes
2000	A House Divided	Rutherford	Television movie
2000–01	George Shrinks	Russell Copeland (voice)	3 episodes
2001	The Day Reagan Was Shot	Donald Regan	Television movie
2003	The Pentagon Papers	John Mitchell	Television movie
2005–06	Naturally, Sadie	Dr. W.S. Finch	7 episodes
2011	Haven	Dom Novelli	Episode: "Roots"
2014	Best Christmas Party Ever	Arthur Tyrell	Television movie
