= Michael J. Fox =

Canadian-American actor and activist (born 1961)

Michael J. Fox CC
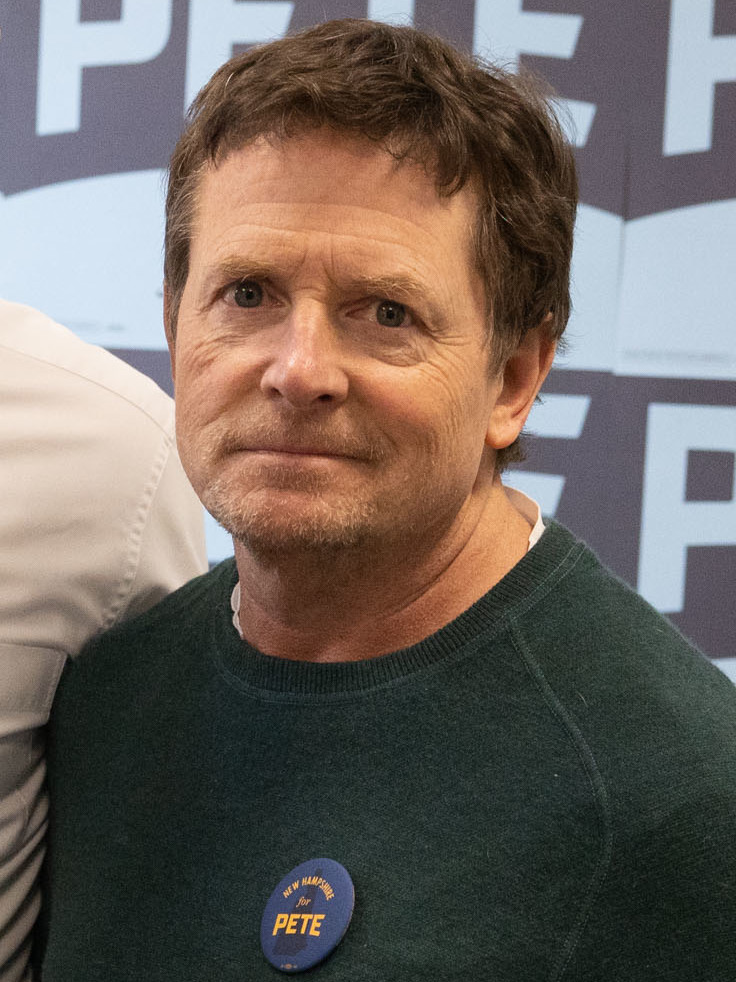
- Fox in 2020
- Born: Michael Andrew Fox; June 9, 1961 (age 65); Edmonton, Alberta, Canada
- Citizenship: Canada; US (2000–present)
- Occupations: Actor; activist; TV producer
- Years active: 1978–present (Note: Fox retired from acting from 2020 to 2025, and continued to make public appearances as an activist during that time.)
- Spouse: Tracy Pollan (m. 1988)
- Children: 4
- Awards: Full list
- Website: michaeljfox.org

Michael Andrew Fox, CC (born June 9, 1961), known professionally as Michael J. Fox, is a Canadian and American actor and activist. His accolades include five Primetime Emmy Awards, four Golden Globe Awards, two Actor Awards, and a Grammy Award. He was appointed as a Companion of the Order of Canada in 2026, and was inducted into Canada's Walk of Fame in 2000 and the Hollywood Walk of Fame in 2002.

Fox began his career as a child actor in the 1970s before becoming a film star portraying Marty McFly in the Back to the Future film trilogy (1985–1990). He went on to star in films such as Teen Wolf (1985), The Secret of My Success (1987), Casualties of War (1989), Doc Hollywood (1991), and The Frighteners (1996). Fox also voiced roles in the Stuart Little films (1999–2005) and Atlantis: The Lost Empire (2001).

On television, he took leading roles as Alex P. Keaton on the NBC sitcom Family Ties (1982–1989), Mike Flaherty in the ABC sitcom Spin City (1996–2000), and Michael Henry in the NBC sitcom The Michael J. Fox Show (2013–2014), the former two of which earned him Primetime Emmy Awards for Outstanding Lead Actor in a Comedy Series. He took guest roles on shows such as Boston Legal (2006), Rescue Me (2009), The Good Wife (2010–2016), Curb Your Enthusiasm (2011, 2017), Designated Survivor (2018), The Good Fight (2020), and Shrinking (2026).

In 1998, Fox disclosed his 1991 diagnosis of Parkinson's disease (PD). He became an advocate for finding a cure and founded The Michael J. Fox Foundation in 2000 to help fund research. For his advocacy of a cure for Parkinson's disease, he received the Jean Hersholt Humanitarian Award in 2022, the Presidential Medal of Freedom in 2025, and the Bob Hope Humanitarian Award and the Lasker-Bloomberg Public Service Award in 2026.

== Early life ==
Michael Andrew Fox was born on June 9, 1961, in Edmonton, Alberta. His mother, Phyllis Evelyn (née Piper), was a payroll clerk and actress, while his father, William Nelson "Bill" Fox, served as a regular soldier in the Royal Canadian Corps of Signals. The fifth of six children, Fox has three sisters and two brothers. Phyllis's father was an English emigrant, and her mother was an emigrant from Belfast, Northern Ireland. Bill's mother was born in Alberta to American parents, and his father was an English emigrant.

The Fox family lived in various cities and towns across Canada due to Bill's career. Bill served in the army for 25 years, retiring in 1971. The same year, the family moved to Burnaby, British Columbia. From the following year to 1985, Bill worked as a dispatcher for the Delta Police Department. Fox attended Burnaby Central Secondary School and has a theatre named for him at Burnaby South Secondary School. At the age of 16, he starred in the Canadian television series Leo and Me, produced by the Canadian Broadcasting Corporation. In 1979, Fox moved to Los Angeles, California, to further his acting career.

Fox was discovered by producer Ronald Shedlo and made his American debut in the television film Letters from Frank, credited under the name "Michael Fox". However, when he registered with the Screen Actors Guild, he discovered that Michael Fox, a veteran actor, was already registered under that name. Fox explained in his memoir Lucky Man:

The Screen Actors Guild prohibits any two members from working under the same stage name, and they already had a 'Michael Fox' on the books. My middle name is Andrew, but 'Andrew Fox' or 'Andy Fox' didn't cut it for me. 'Michael A. Fox' was even worse, the word fox having recently come into use as a synonym for attractive. (Presumptuous?) It also sounded uncomfortably Canadian – Michael Eh? Fox – but maybe I was just being oversensitive. And then I remembered one of my favorite character actors, Michael J. Pollard, the guileless accomplice in Bonnie and Clyde. I stuck in the J, which sometimes I tell people stands for either Jenuine or Jenius, and resubmitted my forms.

== Acting career ==
=== 1980–1984: Early roles and television ===
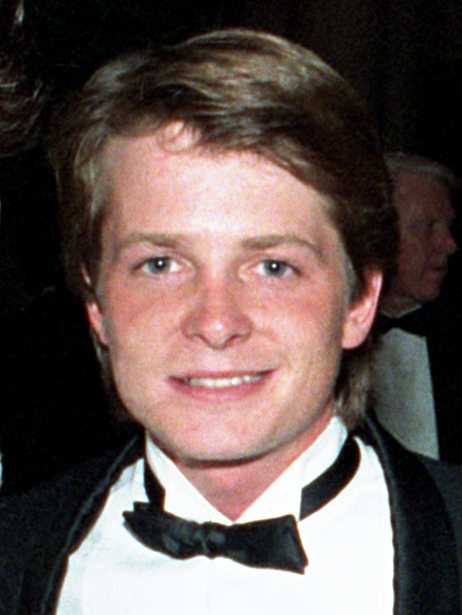
Fox in 1985

Fox's first feature film roles were Midnight Madness (1980) and Class of 1984 (1982), credited in both as Michael Fox. Shortly afterward, he began playing "Young Republican" Alex P. Keaton in the show Family Ties, which aired on NBC for seven seasons from 1982 to 1989. In an interview with Jimmy Fallon in April 2014, Fox stated he negotiated the role at a payphone at Pioneer Chicken. He received the role only after Matthew Broderick was unavailable. Family Ties had been sold to the television network using the pitch "Hip parents, square kids", with the parents originally intended to be the main characters. However, the positive reaction to Fox's performance led to his character becoming the focus of the show following the fourth episode.

Brandon Tartikoff, one of the show's producers, felt that Fox was too short in relation to the actors playing his parents, and tried to have him replaced. Tartikoff reportedly said, "This is not the kind of face you'll ever find on a lunchbox." After his later successes, Fox presented Tartikoff with a custom-made lunchbox with the inscription "To Brandon: This is for you to put your crow in. Love and Kisses, Michael J." Tartikoff kept the lunchbox in his office for the rest of his NBC career.

=== 1985–1990: Back to the Future and stardom ===
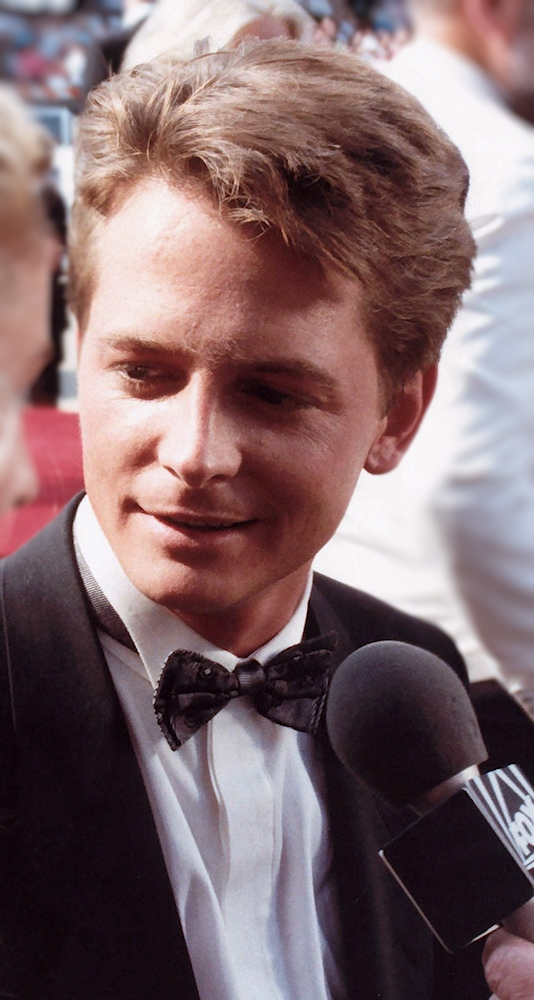
Fox at the 40th Primetime Emmy Awards in August 1988

In January 1985, Fox was cast to replace Eric Stoltz as Marty McFly, a teenager who is accidentally sent back in time from 1985 to 1955 in Back to the Future. Director Robert Zemeckis originally wanted Fox to play Marty, but Gary David Goldberg, the creator of Family Ties, on which Fox was working at the time, refused to allow Zemeckis even to approach Fox. Goldberg felt that, as Meredith Baxter was on maternity leave at the time, Fox's character Alex Keaton was needed to carry the show in her absence. Stoltz was cast and was already filming Back to the Future, but Zemeckis felt that Stoltz was not giving the right type of performance for the humour involved.

Zemeckis quickly replaced Stoltz with Fox, whose schedule was now more open with the return of Baxter. During filming, Fox rehearsed for Family Ties from 10 a.m. to 6 p.m.; he then rushed to the Back to the Future set, where he would rehearse and shoot until 2:30 a.m. This schedule lasted for two full months. Back to the Future was both a critical and commercial success. The film spent eight consecutive weekends as the number-one movie at the US box office in 1985, and it eventually earned a worldwide total of $381.11 million. Variety applauded the performances, opining that Fox and his co-star Christopher Lloyd imbued Marty and Doc Brown's friendship with a quality reminiscent of King Arthur and Merlin. Fox's performance in particular was praised, earning him a nomination for Best Actor in a Motion Picture – Musical or Comedy at the 43rd Golden Globe Awards. The film was followed by two successful sequels, Back to the Future Part II (1989) and Back to the Future Part III (1990), which were produced at the same time but released separately. While filming the scene where Buford "Mad Dog" Tannen tries to hang Marty in Part III, Fox was allowed to perform the stunt himself as long as he knew where to put his hand on the noose to keep himself from choking; however, on the third take, Fox accidentally placed his hand in the wrong spot, which resulted in him choking, passing out, and nearly dying until Zemeckis noticed him in peril and had him cut down.

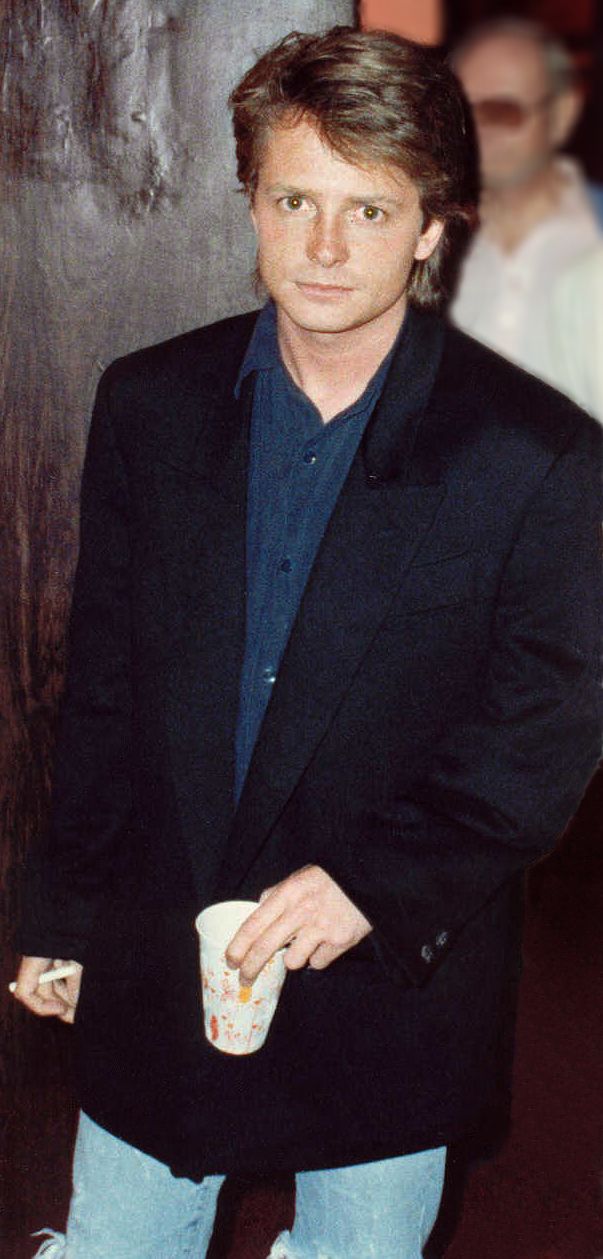
Fox at the 39th Primetime Emmy Awards in September 1987

As a result of working on Family Ties and his back-to-back hit performances in Back to the Future and Teen Wolf (1985), Fox became a teen idol. The VH1 television series The Greatest later named him among their "50 Greatest Teen Idols".

During and immediately after the Back to the Future trilogy, Fox starred in Teen Wolf (1985), Light of Day (1987), The Secret of My Success (1987), and Bright Lights, Big City (1988). In The Secret of My Success, Fox played a recent graduate from Kansas State University who moves to New York City, where he deals with the ups and downs of the business world. The film was successful at the box office, grossing $110 million worldwide. Roger Ebert in the Chicago Sun-Times wrote, "Fox provides a fairly desperate center for the film. It could not have been much fun for him to follow the movie's arbitrary shifts of mood, from sitcom to slapstick, from sex farce to boardroom brawls."

In Bright Lights, Big City, Fox played a fact-checker for a New York magazine who spends his nights partying with alcohol and drugs. The film received mixed reviews, with Hal Hinson in The Washington Post criticizing Fox by claiming that "he was the wrong actor for the job". Meanwhile, Roger Ebert praised the actor's performance: "Fox is very good in the central role (he has a long drunken monologue that is the best thing he has ever done in a movie)". During the shooting of Bright Lights, Big City, Fox co-starred again with Tracy Pollan, his on-screen girlfriend from Family Ties.

Fox won three Emmy Awards for Family Ties in 1986, 1987, and 1988. He won a Golden Globe Award in 1989, the year the show ended. When Fox left the television series Spin City in 2000, his final episodes made numerous allusions to Family Ties: Michael Gross (who played Alex's father Steven) portrays Mike Flaherty's (Fox's character's) therapist, and there is a reference to an off-screen character named "Mallory". Also, when Flaherty becomes an environmental lobbyist in Washington, D.C., he meets a conservative senator from Ohio named Alex P. Keaton, and in one episode Meredith Baxter played Mike's mother.

Fox then starred in Casualties of War (1989), a dark and violent war drama about the Vietnam War, alongside Sean Penn. Casualties of War was not a major box office hit, but Fox was praised for his performance. Don Willmott wrote: "Fox, only one year beyond his Family Ties sitcom silliness, rises to the challenges of acting as the film's moral voice and sharing scenes with the always intimidating Penn." While Family Ties was ending, his production company Snowback Productions set up a two-year production pact at Paramount Pictures to develop film and television projects.

=== 1991–2001: Further films and acclaim ===
In 1991, he starred in Doc Hollywood, a romantic comedy about a talented medical doctor who decides to become a plastic surgeon. While moving from Washington, D.C. to Los Angeles, he winds up as a doctor in a small southern town in South Carolina. Michael Caton-Jones, of Time Out, described Fox in the film as "at his frenetic best". The Hard Way was also released in 1991, with Fox playing an undercover actor learning from police officer James Woods. After being privately diagnosed with Parkinson's disease in 1991 and being cautioned he had "ten good working years left", Fox hastily signed a three-film contract, appearing in For Love or Money (1993), Life with Mikey (1993), and Greedy (1994). In the mid-1990s Fox played smaller supporting roles in The American President (1995) and Mars Attacks! (1996).

His last major film role was in The Frighteners (1996), directed by Peter Jackson. Fox's performance received critical praise, Kenneth Turan in the Los Angeles Times wrote, "The film's actors are equally pleasing. Both Fox, in his most successful starring role in some time, and [Trini] Alvarado, who looks rather like Andie MacDowell here, have no difficulty getting into the manic spirit of things."

In the 1990s and 2000s, Fox took on multiple voice acting roles. He voiced the American Bulldog Chance in Disney's live-action film Homeward Bound: The Incredible Journey and its sequel Homeward Bound II: Lost in San Francisco, the titular character in Stuart Little and its two sequels Stuart Little 2 and Stuart Little 3: Call of the Wild, and Milo James Thatch in Disney's animated film Atlantis: The Lost Empire.

=== 1996–2020: Later career and retirement ===
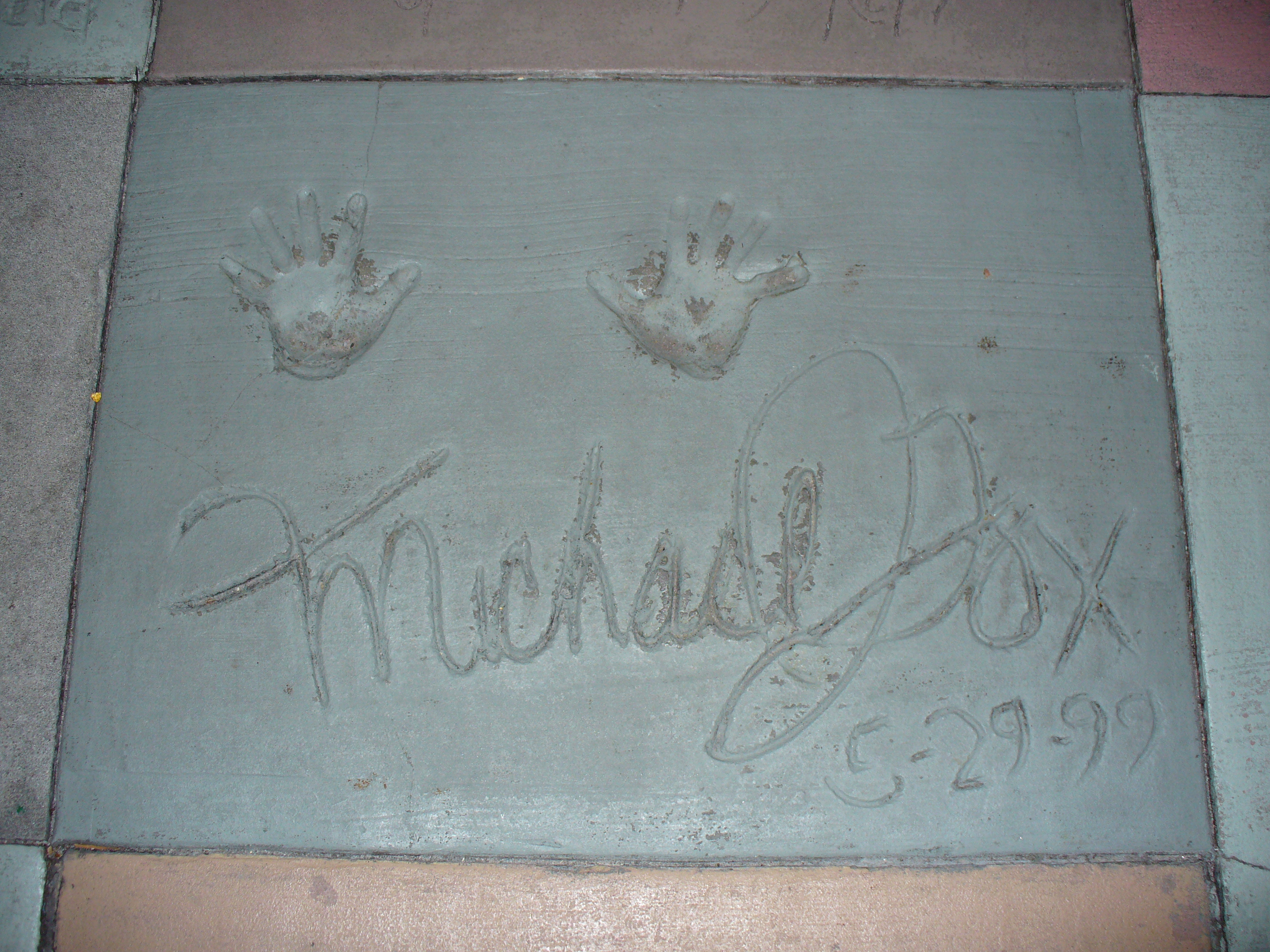
Hand prints of Fox in front of The Great Movie Ride at Disney's Hollywood Studios theme park

Spin City ran from 1996 to 2002 on American television network ABC. The show depicts a fictional New York City government, originally starring Fox as Deputy Mayor Mike Flaherty. Fox served as an executive producer of Spin City alongside co-creators Bill Lawrence and Gary David Goldberg. He won an Emmy Award for Spin City in 2000, three Golden Globe Awards in 1998, 1999, and 2000, and two Screen Actors Guild Awards in 1999 and 2000. During the third season, Fox told the cast and crew of the show that he had Parkinson's disease, and during the fourth season, he announced his retirement from the show. A character played by Charlie Sheen replaced his, and he made three more appearances during the final season. In 2002, his Lottery Hill Entertainment production company attempted to set up a pilot for ABC with DreamWorks Television and Touchstone Television company via first-look agreements, but it never went to series.

In 2004, Fox guest-starred in two episodes of the comedy-drama Scrubs – created by Spin City creator Bill Lawrence – as Dr. Kevin Casey, a surgeon with severe obsessive-compulsive disorder. In 2006, he appeared in four episodes of Boston Legal as a lung cancer patient. The producers brought him back in a recurring role for season three, beginning with the season premiere. Fox was nominated for an Emmy Award for best guest appearance.

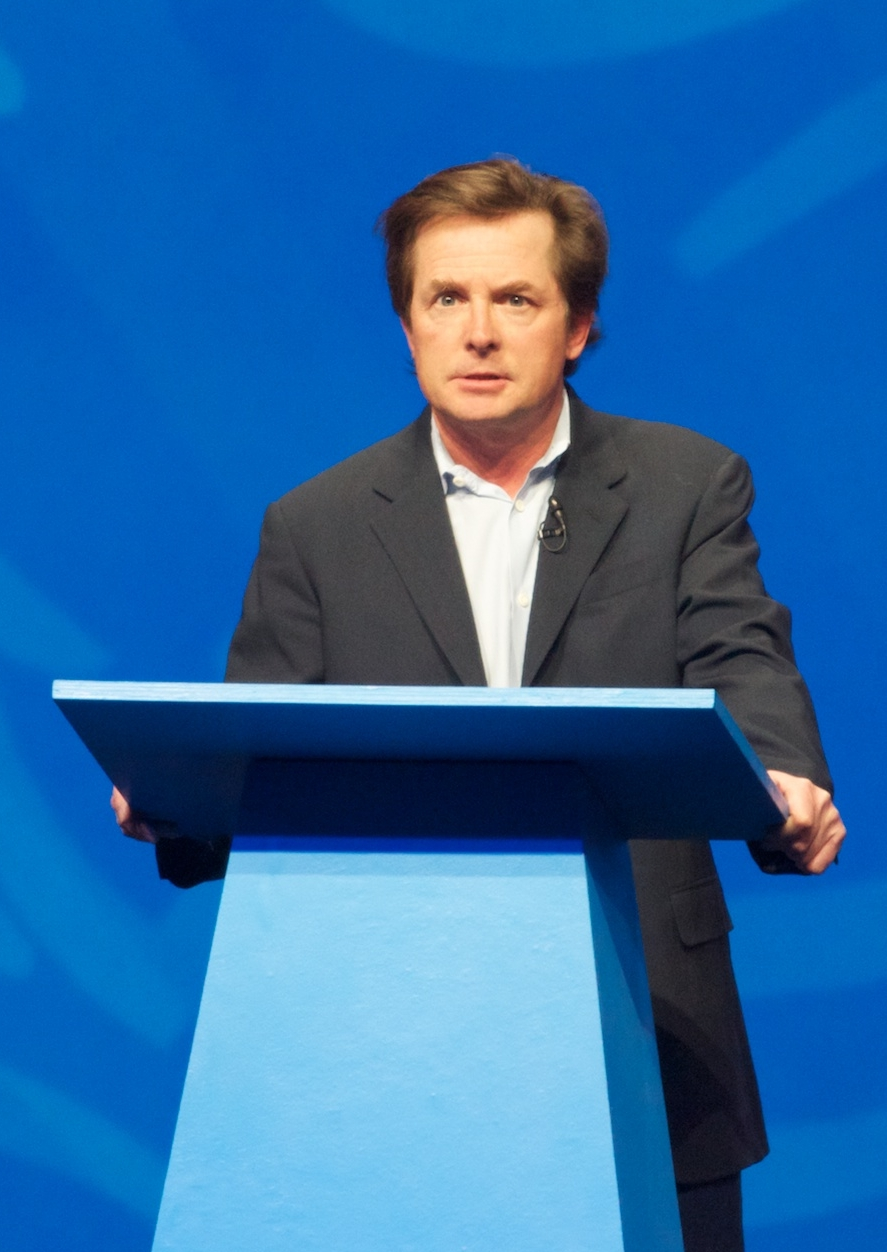
Fox speaking at Lotusphere 2012

In 2009, Fox appeared in five episodes of the television series Rescue Me which earned him an Emmy for Outstanding Guest Actor in a Drama Series. Starting in 2010, Fox played a recurring role in the American drama The Good Wife as crafty attorney Louis Canning and earned Emmy nominations for three consecutive years. In 2011, Fox portrayed himself in the eighth season of Larry David's Curb Your Enthusiasm, in which David's fictionalized self becomes Fox's neighbour and accuses him of using his Parkinson's disease as a manipulative tool. Fox returned in 2017 for a brief appearance, referencing his prior time on the show.

In August 2012, NBC announced that Fox would star in The Michael J. Fox Show, loosely based on his life. It was granted a 22-episode commitment from the network and premiered in September 2013, but was taken off the air after 15 episodes and later cancelled.

Fox has made several appearances in other media. At the 2010 Winter Olympics closing ceremony in Vancouver, British Columbia, Canada, he delivered comedy monologues, along with William Shatner and Catherine O'Hara, in the "I am Canadian" part of the show.

Despite sound-alike A.J. LoCascio voicing Marty McFly in the 2011 Back to the Future episodic adventure game, Fox lent his likeness to the in-game version of Marty alongside Christopher Lloyd. Fox made a special guest appearance in the final episode of the series as an elder version of Marty, as well as his great-grandfather Willie McFly.

Fox appeared in five episodes of the second season of the ABC political drama Designated Survivor, in the recurring role of Ethan West, investigating whether the president was fit to continue in the job.

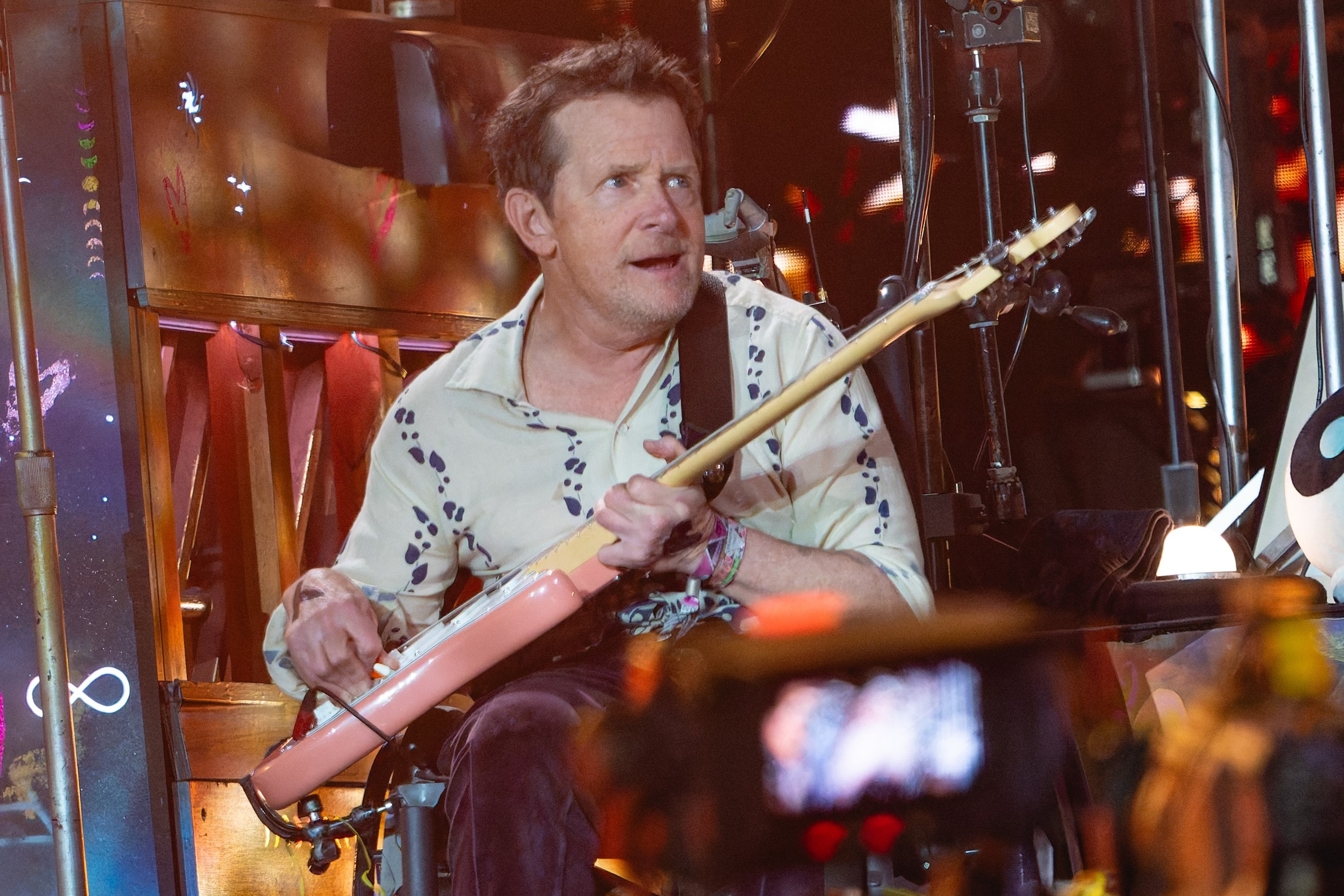
Fox playing the guitar with Coldplay at the Glastonbury Festival in 2024

In 2020, Fox retired from acting due to the increasing unreliability of his speech. Fox's memoir, No Time Like the Future: An Optimist Considers Mortality, was released that November. In the book, Fox explained that "not being able to speak reliably is a game-breaker for an actor" and that he was experiencing memory loss. Fox wrote, "There is a time for everything, and my time of putting in a 12-hour workday, and memorizing seven pages of dialogue, is best behind me...I enter a second retirement. That could change, because everything changes. But if this is the end of my acting career, so be it."

=== 2021–present: Still, and return to acting ===
In 2021, Fox appeared in one episode of the television series Expedition: Back to the Future, as well as in the animated film Back Home Again. On May 12, 2023, Still: A Michael J. Fox Movie, a documentary which follows his career and Parkinson's disease diagnosis, was released. The film was directed by Davis Guggenheim and made for Apple TV+. It was positively received, winning four of the seven awards it was nominated for at the 75th Primetime Emmy Awards. Stephanie Zacharek on behalf of Time wrote, "Still: A Michael J. Fox Movie reminds us that a person stricken with a disease doesn't become that disease... What's striking about Still is how celebratory it is. This isn't the story of a wonderful actor felled by an illness; it's the story of a wonderful actor," while Mark Kermode of The Guardian called it "An intimate, uplifting star portrait."

On June 29, 2024, he was featured on the Glastonbury Festival as a guest of British rock band Coldplay, playing the guitar with them on the songs "Humankind" and "Fix You". Lead singer and pianist Chris Martin mentioned during the show that "Back to the Future is the main reason we became a band".

On May 15, 2025, it was revealed that Fox had been cast in the third season of the comedy drama Shrinking, making a return to acting. In June 2025, Fox acted for the National Hockey League's Boston Bruins, playing himself in a video parodying Back to the Future to promote new uniforms for the team. Fox is a close friend of Bruins president Cam Neely, who also appeared in the video.

On October 14, 2025, his fifth book, Future Boy: Back to the Future and My Journey Through the Space-Time Continuum, co-written with Nelle Fortenberry, was published by Flatiron Books. The memoir covers his time on set while filming Back to the Future.

He had a voice cameo in the 2025 Walt Disney Animation Studios film Zootopia 2 as an incarcerated fox, whose name—"Michael J. the fox"—is a play on Fox's own name.

== Activism ==
While shooting the film Doc Hollywood in early 1991, Fox developed a sore shoulder and a twitch in his little finger; he was subsequently diagnosed with early-onset Parkinson's disease later that year at the age of 30, but did not make his condition known to the public until 1998. He became an activist and began The Michael J. Fox Foundation to increase research efforts for a cure.

Fox has written several memoirs about his experiences. His first book, Lucky Man, focused on how, after seven years of denial of the disease, he set up the Michael J. Fox Foundation, stopped drinking and became an advocate for people living with Parkinson's disease. In 2006, Fox starred in a campaign ad for then-State Auditor of Missouri Claire McCaskill in her successful 2006 Senate campaign against incumbent Jim Talent, expressing her support for embryonic stem cell research. In the ad, he visibly showed the effects of his Parkinson's disease:

As you might know, I care deeply about stem cell research. In Missouri, you can elect Claire McCaskill, who shares my hope for cures. Unfortunately, Senator Jim Talent opposes expanding stem cell research. Senator Talent even wanted to criminalize the science that gives us the chance for hope. They say all politics is local, but that's not always the case. What you do in Missouri matters to millions of Americans, Americans like me.

— Michael J. Fox, Campaign Advertisement for Claire McCaskill

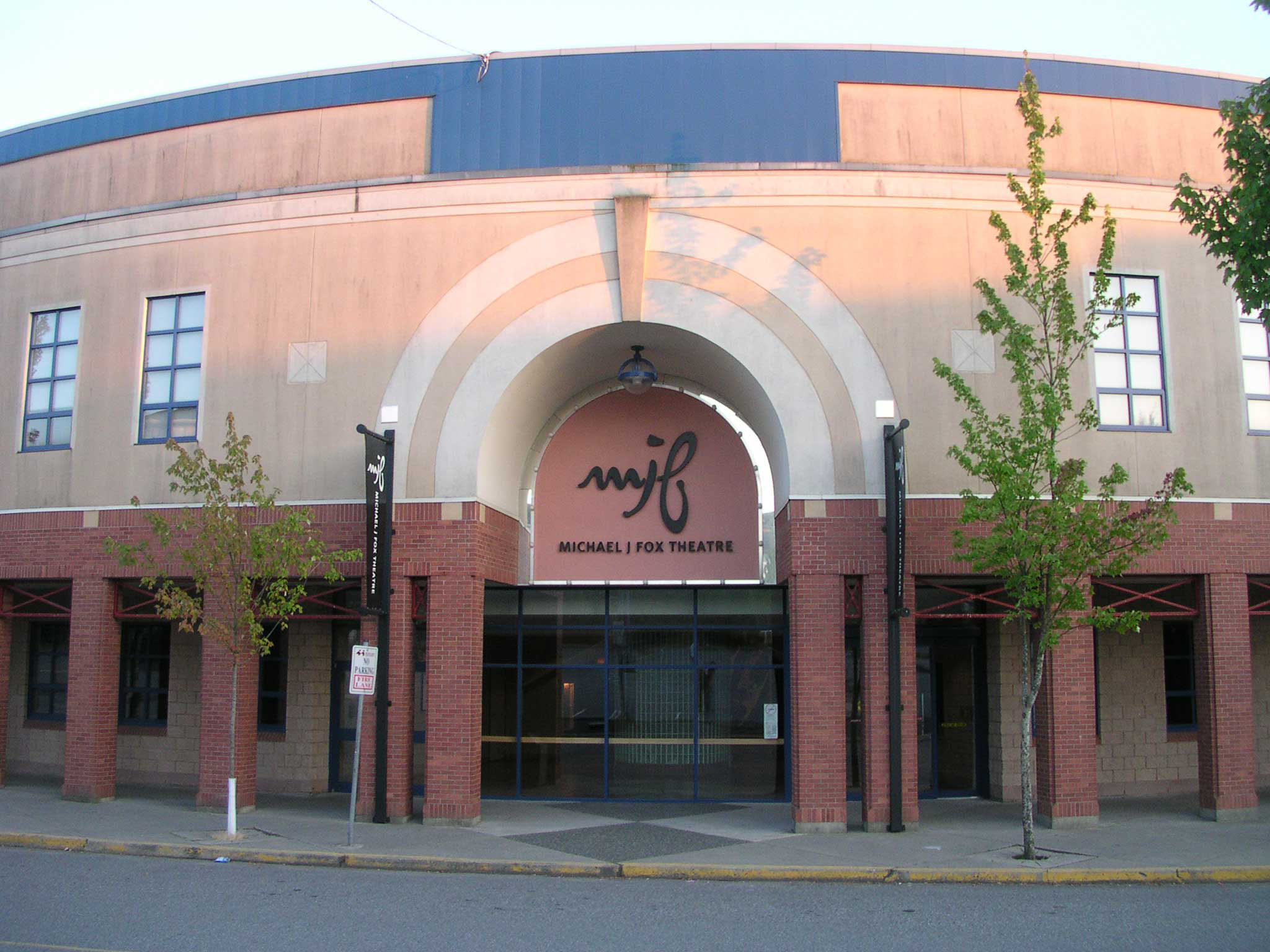
The Michael J. Fox Theatre at Burnaby South Secondary School

The New York Times called it "one of the most powerful and talked about political advertisements in years" and polls indicated that the commercial had a measurable impact on the way voters voted, in an election that McCaskill won. His second book, Always Looking Up: The Adventures of an Incurable Optimist, describes his life between 1999 and 2009, with much of the book centered on how Fox got into campaigning for stem cell research. On March 31, 2009, Fox appeared on The Oprah Winfrey Show with Mehmet Oz to discuss his condition as well as his book, his family and his primetime special, which aired May 7, 2009, (Michael J. Fox: Adventures of an Incurable Optimist).

His work led him to be named one of the 100 people "whose power, talent or moral example is transforming the world" in 2007 by Time magazine. On March 5, 2010, Fox received an honorary doctorate in medicine from Karolinska Institute for his contributions to research in Parkinson's disease. He received an honorary doctorate of laws from the University of British Columbia. His third book, A Funny Thing Happened on the Way to the Future: Twists and Turns and Lessons Learned, was released in 2010.

On May 31, 2012, he received an honorary degree of Doctor of Laws from the Justice Institute of British Columbia to recognize his accomplishments as a performer as well as his commitment to raising research funding and awareness for Parkinson's disease. Fox recalled performing in role-playing simulations as part of police recruit training exercises at the Institute early in his career.

In 2016, his organization created a raffle to raise awareness for Parkinson's disease and raised $6.75 million, with the help of Nike, Inc. via two auctions, one in Hong Kong and the other in London.

In 2020, his fourth book, No Time Like the Future: An Optimist Considers Mortality, was released.

At the 2022 Governors Awards, Fox was awarded the Jean Hersholt Humanitarian Award for his efforts in fighting Parkinson's, having raised over $1 billion for research. The award was presented by friend Woody Harrelson.

In a 2023 interview with Jane Pauley on CBS Sunday Morning, Fox said, "I'm not gonna lie. It's getting harder. Every day it's tougher." He said he has had spinal surgery for a benign tumour and has broken bones in several falls.

He was named in Time Magazine's 2024 list of influential people in health.

== Personal life ==
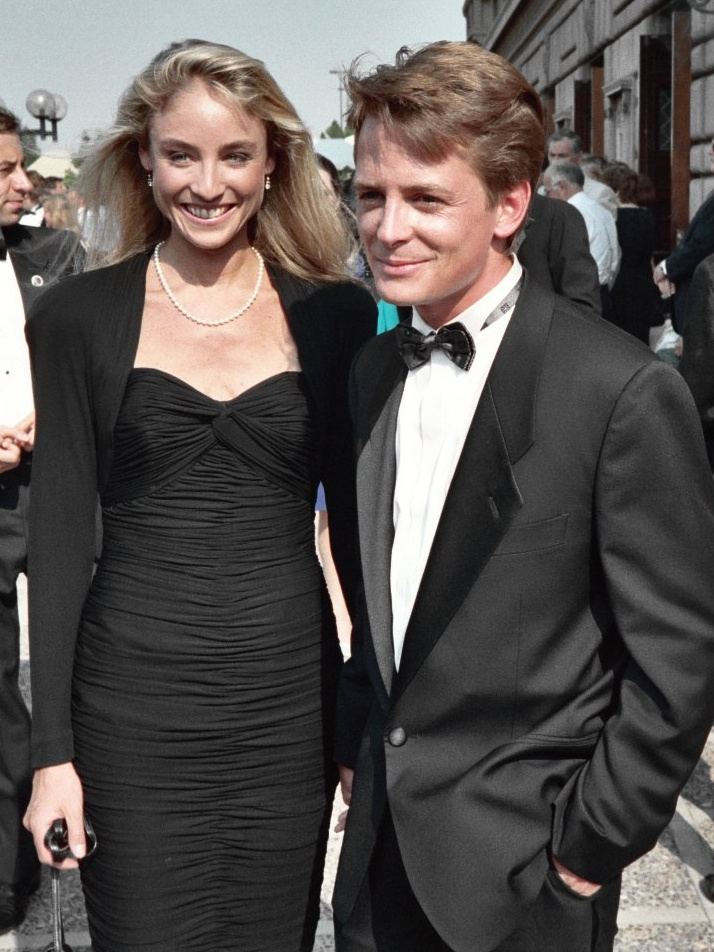
Fox with Tracy Pollan at the 40th Primetime Emmy Awards in August 1988 shortly after their marriage

=== Marriage and family ===
Fox met his wife, Tracy Pollan, when she played the role of his girlfriend, Ellen, on Family Ties. The couple married on July 16, 1988, at West Mountain Inn in Arlington, Vermont. They have four children: one son and three daughters. Shortly before the couple's marriage, Fox purchased a 121-acre (490,000 m^{2}) estate named Lottery Hill Farm in South Woodstock, Vermont, which he listed in 2012. In 1997, Fox purchased an apartment on Fifth Avenue in Upper East Side, Manhattan, New York City, where the family lived primarily until 2020. Also in 1997, Fox and Pollan built an estate on 80 acres (320,000 m^{2}) of farmland in Sharon, Connecticut, which he listed in 2016. In 2007, he purchased a 7,000-square-foot (650 m^{2}) house in Quogue, New York, where the family lived part-time and spent the early months of the COVID-19 pandemic. In 2021, Fox sold the house, and the family moved to Santa Barbara, California, where they spent several months before taking up residence in Malibu.

=== Citizenship and politics ===
Fox acquired US citizenship in 2000 but remains a Canadian citizen as well. He provided a light-hearted segment during the 2010 Winter Olympics' closing ceremony in Vancouver on February 28, 2010, when he expressed how proud he is to be Canadian. On June 4, 2010, the city of Burnaby granted him the Freedom of the City. Fox endorsed Pete Buttigieg prior to the 2020 United States presidential election.

=== Parkinson's disease ===
Fox started displaying symptoms of early-onset Parkinson's disease (PD) in early 1991 while shooting the film Doc Hollywood and was diagnosed shortly thereafter. Though his initial symptoms were only a twitching little finger and a sore shoulder, he was told that within a few years he would not be able to work. The causes of Parkinson's disease are not well understood, and may include genetic and environmental factors. Fox is one of at least four members of the cast and crew of Leo and Me who developed early-onset Parkinson's. According to Fox, this is not enough people to be defined as a cluster so it has not been well researched. In 2020, he told Hadley Freeman of The Guardian: "I can think of a thousand possible scenarios: I used to go fishing in a river near paper mills and eat the salmon I caught; I've been to a lot of farms; I smoked a lot of pot in high school when the government was poisoning the crops. But you can drive yourself crazy trying to figure it out."

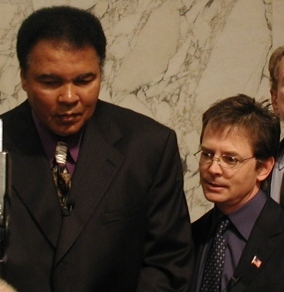
Fox and Muhammad Ali in 2002 testifying before a US Senate committee on providing government funding to combat Parkinson's

After his diagnosis, Fox began drinking heavily and grew depressed. In 1992, he eventually sought help and stopped drinking altogether. Fox went public with his Parkinson's disease in 1998 and has become a strong advocate for Parkinson's disease research. His foundation, The Michael J. Fox Foundation, was created to help advance every promising research path to curing Parkinson's disease. Since 2010, he has led a $100-million effort, which is the Foundation's landmark observational study, to discover the biological markers of Parkinson's disease with the Parkinson's Progression Markers Initiative (PPMI).

Fox manages the symptoms of his Parkinson's disease with the drug carbidopa/levodopa. He had a thalamotomy in 1998.

In Lucky Man, Fox wrote that he did not take his medication prior to his testimony before the Senate Appropriations Subcommittee in 1999.

I had made a deliberate choice to appear before the subcommittee without medication. It seemed to me that this occasion demanded that my testimony about the effects of the disease, and the urgency we as a community were feeling, be seen as well as heard. For people who had never observed me in this kind of shape, the transformation must have been startling.

In an interview with NPR in April 2002, Fox explained what he does when he becomes symptomatic:

Well, actually, I've been erring on the side of caution—I think 'erring' is actually the right word—in that I've been medicating perhaps too much, in the sense [that] ... the symptoms ... people see in some of these interviews that [I] have been on are actually dyskinesia, which is a reaction to the medication. Because if I were purely symptomatic with Parkinson's symptoms, a lot of times speaking is difficult. There's a kind of a cluttering of speech and it's very difficult to sit still, to sit in one place. You know, the symptoms are different, so I'd rather kind of suffer the symptoms of dyskinesia ... this kind of weaving and this kind of continuous thing is much preferable, actually, than pure Parkinson's symptoms. So that's what I generally do ... I haven't had any, you know, problems with pure Parkinson's symptoms in any of these interviews, because I'll tend to just make sure that I have enough Sinemet in my system and, in some cases, too much. But to me, it's preferable. It's not representative of what I'm like in my everyday life. I get a lot of people with Parkinson's coming up to me saying, 'You take too much medication.' I say, 'Well, you sit across from Larry King and see if you want to tempt it.'

— Interview, April 30, 2002, Fresh Air, NPR

== Filmography ==
=== Film ===
| Year | Title | Role | Notes | Ref(s). |
|---|---|---|---|---|
| 1980 | Midnight Madness | Scott Larson | | |
| 1982 | Class of 1984 | Arthur Summers | | |
| 1985 | Back to the Future | Marty McFly | | |
| 1985 | Teen Wolf | Scott Howard | | |
| 1987 | Light of Day | Joe Rasnick | | |
| 1987 | The Secret of My Success | Brantley Foster/Carlton Whitfield | | |
| 1988 | Bright Lights, Big City | Jamie Conway | | |
| 1989 | Casualties of War | PFC. Max Eriksson | | |
| 1989 | Back to the Future Part II | Marty McFly / Marty McFly Jr. / Marlene McFly | | |
| 1990 | Back to the Future Part III | Marty McFly / Seamus McFly | | |
| 1991 | The Hard Way | Nick "Nicky" Lang | | |
| 1991 | Doc Hollywood | Dr. Benjamin "Ben" Stone | | |
| 1993 | Homeward Bound: The Incredible Journey | Chance/Narrator | Voice | |
| 1993 | Life with Mikey | Michael "Mikey" Chapman | | |
| 1993 | For Love or Money | Doug Ireland | | |
| 1994 | Where the Rivers Flow North | Clayton Farnsworth | | |
| 1994 | Greedy | Daniel "Danny" McTeague Jr. | | |
| 1995 | Coldblooded | Tim Alexander | Also producer | |
| 1995 | Blue in the Face | Pete Maloney | | |
| 1995 | The American President | Lewis Rothschild | | |
| 1996 | Homeward Bound II: Lost in San Francisco | Chance | Voice | |
| 1996 | The Frighteners | Frank Bannister | | |
| 1996 | Mars Attacks! | Jason Stone | | |
| 1999 | Stuart Little | Stuart Little | Voice | |
| 2001 | Atlantis: The Lost Empire | Milo James Thatch | Voice | |
| 2002 | Interstate 60 | Mr Baker | Cameo | |
| 2002 | Stuart Little 2 | Stuart Little | Voice | |
| 2006 | Stuart Little 3: Call of the Wild | Stuart Little | Voice, direct to video | |
| 2013 | Drew: The Man Behind the Poster | Himself | Documentary | |
| 2014 | Annie | Himself | Cameo | |
| 2015 | Being Canadian | Himself | Documentary | |
| 2015 | Back in Time | Himself | Documentary | |
| 2015 | Mr. Calzaghe | Himself | Documentary | |
| 2016 | A.R.C.H.I.E. | A.R.C.H.I.E. | Voice | |
| 2018 | A.R.C.H.I.E. 2: Mission Impawsible | A.R.C.H.I.E. | Voice | |
| 2019 | See You Yesterday | Mr Lockhart | Cameo | |
| 2021 | Back Home Again | Michael J. Bird | Voice, short film | |
| 2023 | Still: A Michael J. Fox Movie | Himself | Documentary | |
| 2025 | Zootopia 2 | Michael J. The Fox | Voice cameo | |

=== Television ===
| Year | Title | Functioned as | | | Role | Notes | Ref(s). |
| Year | Title | Actor | Director | Executive Producer | Role | Notes | Ref(s). |
|---|---|---|---|---|---|---|---|
| 1978 | The Magic Lie | Yes | No | No | Nicky | Episode: "The Master" | |
| 1978 | Leo and Me | Yes | No | No | Jamie Romano | 12 episodes | |
| 1978 | Witch of Westminster Crossing | Yes | No | No | Harley | Television short film | |
| 1979 | Letters from Frank | Yes | No | No | Ricky | Television film | |
| 1979 | Lou Grant | Yes | No | No | Paul Stone | Episode: "Kids" | |
| 1980 | Family | Yes | No | No | Richard Topol | Episode: "Such a Fine Line" | |
| 1980 | Here's Boomer | Yes | No | No | Jackie | Episode: "Tell 'Em Boomer Sent You" | |
| 1980 | Trapper John, M.D. | Yes | No | No | Elliot Schweitzer | Episode: "Brain Child" | |
| 1980–1981 | Palmerstown, USA | Yes | No | No | Willy-Joe Hall | 11 episodes | |
| 1982 | Teachers Only | Yes | No | No | Jeff | Episode: "The Make Up Test" | |
| 1982–1989 | Family Ties | Yes | No | No | Alex P. Keaton | 176 episodes | |
| 1983 | The Love Boat | Yes | No | No | Jimmy | Episode: "He Ain't Heavy" | |
| 1983 | High School USA | Yes | No | No | Jay-Jay Manners | Television film | |
| 1983–1984 | The $25,000 Pyramid | Yes | No | No | Himself | 30 episodes | |
| 1984 | Night Court | Yes | No | No | Eddie Simms | Episode: "Santa Goes Downtown" | |
| 1984 | The Homemade Comedy Special | Yes | No | No | Host | Television special | |
| 1984 | Don't Ask Me, Ask God | Yes | No | No | Future Son | Television special | |
| 1985 | Family Ties Vacation | Yes | No | No | Alex P. Keaton | Television film | |
| 1985 | Poison Ivy | Yes | No | No | Dennis Baxter | Television film | |
| 1986 | David Letterman's 2nd Annual Holiday Film Festival | Yes | Yes | No | Himself | Short film; segment: "The Iceman Hummeth"; also writer | |
| 1987 | Dear America: Letters Home from Vietnam | Yes | No | No | Pfc. Raymond Griffiths | Voice, documentary | |
| 1987 | The Return of Bruno | Yes | No | No | Himself | Television documentary film | |
| 1987 | Muppet Babies | Yes | No | No | Alex P. Keaton | Voice, episode: "This Little Piggy Went to Hollywood" | |
| 1988 | Mickey's 60th Birthday | Yes | No | No | Alex P. Keaton | Television special | |
| 1990 | Sex, Buys & Advertising | Yes | No | No | Himself | Television special | |
| 1991 | Saturday Night Live | Yes | No | No | Host | Episode: "Michael J. Fox/The Black Crowes" | |
| 1991 | Tales from the Crypt | Yes | Yes | No | Prosecutor | Episode: "The Trap" | |
| 1992 | Brooklyn Bridge | No | Yes | No | n/a | Episode: "Rainy Day" | |
| 1992 | Shelley Duvall's Bedtime Stories | Yes | No | No | Narrator | Episode: "There's a Nightmare in My Closet" | |
| 1994 | Don't Drink the Water | Yes | No | No | Axel Magee | Television film | |
| 1996–2001 | Spin City | Yes | No | Yes | Mike Flaherty | 103 episodes | |
| 1997 | The Chris Rock Show | Yes | No | No | Himself | Episode: "Jesse Jackson/Rakim"; Uncredited | |
| 1999 | Anna Says | No | No | Yes | n/a | | |
| 2002 | Otherwise Engaged | No | No | Yes | n/a | Pilot episode | |
| 2002 | Clone High | Yes | No | No | Gandhi's Remaining Kidney | Voice, episode: "Escape to Beer Mountain: A Rope of Sand" | |
| 2003 | Hench at Home | No | No | Yes | n/a | Also writer | |
| 2004 | Scrubs | Yes | No | No | Dr. Kevin Casey | 2 episodes | |
| 2005 | Saving Milly | Yes | No | No | Himself | Television film; Uncredited | |
| 2006 | Boston Legal | Yes | No | No | Daniel Post | 6 episodes | |
| 2009 | Rescue Me | Yes | No | No | Dwight | 5 episodes | |
| 2009 | The Magic 7 | Yes | No | No | Marcel Maggot | Voice, television film | |
| 2010–2016 | The Good Wife | Yes | No | No | Louis Canning | 26 episodes | |
| 2011 | Phineas and Ferb | Yes | No | No | Michael / Werewolf | Voice, episode: "The Curse of Candace" | |
| 2011, 2017 | Curb Your Enthusiasm | Yes | No | No | Himself | 2 episodes | |
| 2013–2014 | The Michael J. Fox Show | Yes | No | Yes | Mike Henry | 22 episodes | |
| 2015 | Jimmy Kimmel Live! | Yes | No | No | Marty McFly | Skit celebrating Back to the Future | |
| 2016 | Nightcap | Yes | No | No | Himself | Episode: "The Cannon" | |
| 2018 | Designated Survivor | Yes | No | No | Ethan West | 5 episodes | |
| 2019 | Corner Gas Animated | Yes | No | No | Himself | Voice, episode: "Dream Waiver" | |
| 2020 | The Good Fight | Yes | No | No | Louis Canning | 2 episodes | |
| 2021 | Expedition: Back to the Future | Yes | No | No | Himself | Episode: "Great Josh!" | |
| 2026 | Shrinking | Yes | No | No | Gerry | 3 episodes | |

=== Video games ===
| Year | Title | Voice role | Notes |
|---|---|---|---|
| 2011 | Back to the Future: The Game | William McFly / Future Marty McFly | Episode: "Outatime" |
| 2015 | Lego Dimensions | Marty McFly | |

=== Web ===
| Year | Title | Role | Notes |
|---|---|---|---|
| 2020 | "The Origins of Holiday" (Lil Nas X song trailer) | Marty McFly | |

== Awards and honours ==
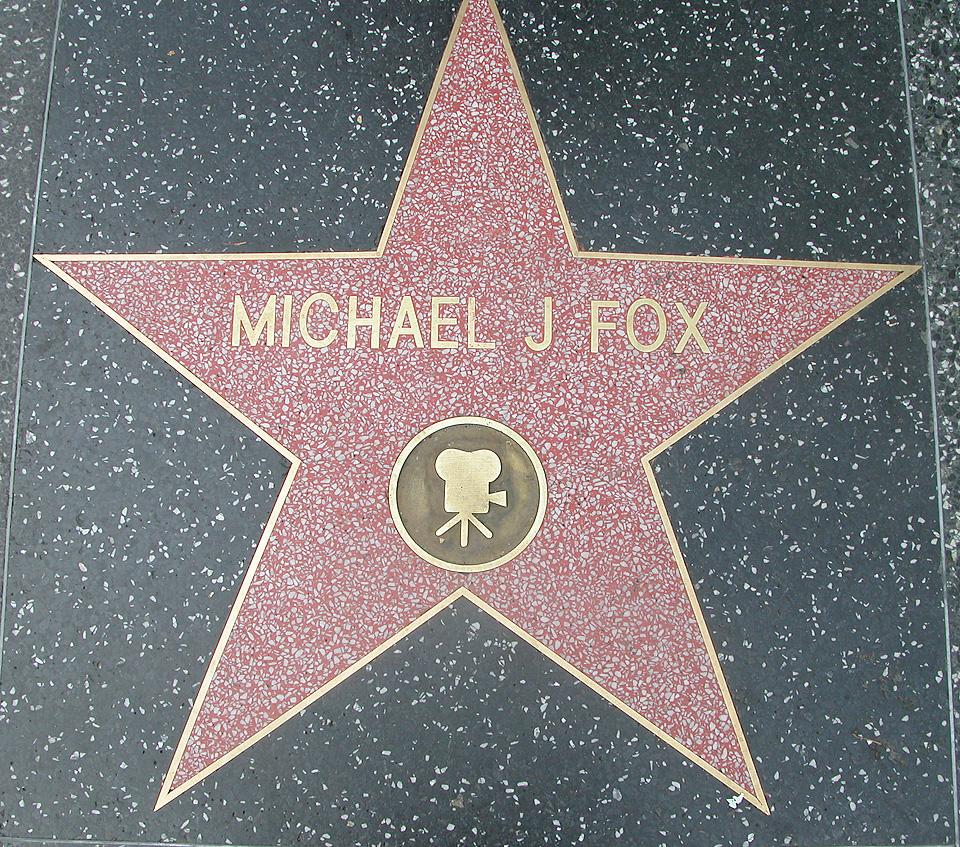
Fox's star on the Hollywood Walk of Fame for Motion Picture – 7021 Hollywood Blvd.

Over his career Fox won five Emmy Awards, four Golden Globe Awards, two Actor Awards, and a Grammy Award. He was appointed an Officer of the Order of Canada in 2010 and promoted to Companion in 2026, and was inducted into Canada's Walk of Fame in 2000 and the Hollywood Walk of Fame in 2002. For his advocacy of a cure for Parkinson's disease he received the Jean Hersholt Humanitarian Award from the Academy of Motion Picture Arts and Sciences in 2022 and the Bob Hope Humanitarian Award from the Academy of Television Arts & Sciences in 2026.

- 2000: Honoured by the Family Television Awards for Acting.
- 2000: Inducted into Canada's Walk of Fame, located in Toronto, Ontario, which acknowledges the achievements and accomplishments of successful Canadians.
- 2002: Received the 2209th Star on the Hollywood Walk of Fame in recognition of his contributions to the motion picture industry, presented to him by the Chamber of Commerce.
- 2005: Received the Golden Plate Award of the American Academy of Achievement.
- 2011: Honoured with the Golden Camera Award for Lifetime Achievement – International.
- 2010: Appointed Officer of the Order of Canada – The Officer O.C. recognizes national service or achievement.
- 2010: Received the National Association of Broadcasters Distinguished Service Award.
- 2010: Received an honorary doctorate from the Karolinska Institute.
- 2013: Honoured with the Golden Apple Award by the Casting Society of America.
- 2021: Doctor of Fine Arts, honoris causa, from Simon Fraser University.
- 2022: Received the Jean Hersholt Humanitarian Award from the 95th Academy Awards.
- 2025: Received the Presidential Medal of Freedom from President Joe Biden.
- 2026: Promoted to Companion of the Order of Canada.
- 2026: Honoured with the Lasker-Bloomberg Public Service Award for empowering patients' voices and accelerating research toward better therapies and a cure for Parkinson's disease.
- 2026: Received the Bob Hope Humanitarian Award from the 78th Primetime Emmy Awards.

== Books ==
- Fox, Michael J. (2002). Lucky Man: A Memoir. New York: Hyperion. ISBN 978-0-7868-6764-6.
- Fox, Michael J. (2009). Always Looking Up: The Adventures of an Incurable Optimist. New York: Hyperion. ISBN 978-1-4013-0338-9.
- Fox, Michael J. (2010). A Funny Thing Happened on the Way to the Future: Twists and Turns and Lessons Learned. New York: Hyperion. ISBN 978-1-4013-2386-8.
- Fox, Michael J. (2020). No Time Like the Future: An Optimist Considers Mortality. New York: Flatiron Books. ISBN 978-1-2502-6561-6.
- Fox, Michael J. (2025). Future Boy: Back to the Future and My Journey Through the Space-Time Continuum. New York: Flatiron Books. ISBN 978-1-2508-6678-3.
