= Pat Lowther =

Canadian poet (1935–1975)

- Born: Patricia Louise Tinmuth; July 29, 1935; Vancouver, British Columbia
- Died: September 24, 1975 (aged 40); Canada
- Occupation: Poet
- Spouse: Roy Lowther
- Children: 4
- Writing career
- Period: 1960s–1970s
- Notable works: This Difficult Flowering, Milk Stone, A Stone Diary

Patricia Louise Lowther (born Patricia Louise Tinmuth) (July 29, 1935 – September 24, 1975) was a Canadian poet. Born in Vancouver, British Columbia, she grew up in the neighboring city of North Vancouver.

In September 1975, Lowther was reported missing after failing to arrive for a scheduled poetry reading at Vancouver's Ironworkers Hall. Three weeks later, her body was found in Furry Creek near Squamish, British Columbia. Roy Lowther, her second husband, was convicted of her murder in June 1977. He died in Matsqui prison in Abbotsford, British Columbia, on July 14, 1985.

== Life ==
Lowther's first published poem appeared in The Vancouver Sun when she was ten years old. In 1968, she published her first collection, This Difficult Flowering, with Very Stone House, a small Canadian poetry press. In 1972, "The Age of the Bird", a long poem inspired by revolutionary politics in South America, was published as a broadside by Blackfish Press. Its companion poem, "Regard to Neruda", was written for Pablo Neruda, one of her political and literary inspirations.

Milk Stone, published in 1974 by Borealis Press, became Lowther's breakthrough into Canadian mainstream literature. A Stone Diary was submitted to Oxford University Press in 1975. Lowther was co-chair of the League of Canadian Poets, and the BC Arts Council. She was about to begin her first teaching term as a Creative Writing sessional at the University of British Columbia when she was murdered by her husband.

In September 1975, Lowther was reported missing after failing to arrive for a scheduled poetry reading at Vancouver's Ironworkers Hall. Three weeks later, her body was found in Furry Creek near Squamish, British Columbia. Roy Lowther, her second husband, whom she had married in 1963, was convicted of her murder in June 1977. He died in Matsqui prison in Abbotsford, British Columbia, on July 14, 1985.

Lowther's daughters are the poet Christine Lowther, Beth Lowther, and Kathy Lyons (d. 2015). Her son is Alan Domphousse.

== Legacy ==
Two years after Lowther's murder, Oxford University Press published A Stone Diary. In 1980, a collection of Lowther's early and unpublished poems, Final Instructions, was also published. Also that year, the League of Canadian Poets established the Pat Lowther Award, a prize awarded annually to a book of poetry by a Canadian woman.

A manuscript was discovered in 1996 and published under the title Time Capsule.

Lowther's life and death have served to inspire a number of works, including her daughter Christine Lowther's first poetry collection, New Power (1999), and the novels Swann: A Mystery (1987) by Carol Shields and Furry Creek by Keith Harrison (1999).

== See also ==
- List of solved missing person cases: 1950–1999

== Awards ==
- Canada Council grant

== Bibliography ==
- This Difficult Flowering, Very Stone House, Vancouver, 1968
- The Age of the Bird - 1972
- Milk Stone, Borealis Press, 1974
- A Stone Diary, Oxford University Press, 1977
- Dona Sturmanis; Frederick H. Candelaria, eds. (1980). Final Instructions. Orca Sound. ISBN 978-0-920616-04-8.
- Time Capsule. Polestar Book Publishers. 1997. ISBN 978-1-896095-25-7.

== Critical studies ==
- Gail McKay (1978). The Pat Lowther poem. Coach House Press. ISBN 978-0-88910-105-0.
- Margaret Atwood (2000). "Last Testaments: Pat Lowther and John Thompson". Second words: selected critical prose, 1960-1982. House of Anansi. ISBN 978-0-88784-654-0.
- Toby Brooks (2000). Pat Lowther's Continent: Her Life and Work. Gynergy Books. ISBN 978-0-921881-54-4.
- Christine Wiesenthal, ed. (2005). The Half-Lives of Pat Lowther. University of Toronto Press. ISBN 978-0-8020-3635-3.
- Christine Wiesenthal, ed. (2010.) The Collected Works of Pat Lowther. NeWest Press. ISBN 978-1-897126-61-5
