= Small Ceremonies =

1976 novel by Carol Shield

- First Canadian edition
- Author: Carol Shields
- Language: English
- Publisher: McGraw-Hill Ryerson
- Publication date: 1976
- Publication place: Canada
- ISBN: 978-0070823402

Small Ceremonies is a 1976 novel by American-Canadian writer Carol Shields. The novel centres on Judith Gill, a university academic who is writing a biography of Susanna Moodie, depicting a year in the life of her family.

The novel has sometimes been described as a roman à clef, as it was published around the same time as Shields' own real-life biography of Moodie and the protagonist's academic background closely resembled Shields's own.

The novel won the Canadian Authors Association's annual award for fiction in 1977, and was shortlisted for the Books in Canada First Novel Award.
