= Bob Hope Humanitarian Award =

American humanitarian award

The Bob Hope Humanitarian Award was established in 2002 by the Board of Governors of the Academy of Television Arts & Sciences in recognition of Bob Hope's trailblazing career. The award, one of the highest honors presented by the Board, recognizes the contributions accomplished by Hope, for more than half a century, to the growth and development of broadcasting in radio and television as a family medium, and as a platform for political and social commentary.

== Recipients ==
- 2002 – Oprah Winfrey
- 2003 – Bill Cosby
- 2004 – Danny Thomas (posthumous accepted by his daughter, Marlo Thomas, on his behalf)
- 2010 – George Clooney
- 2022 – Sean Penn
- 2025 – Ted Danson and Mary Steenburgen
- 2026 – Michael J. Fox
