= Winifred Merrill Warren =

American violinist (1898–1990)

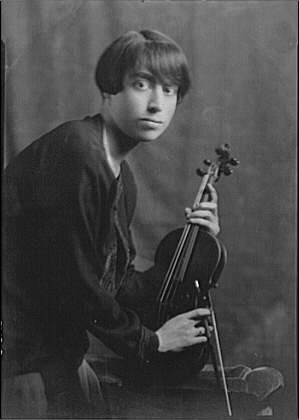
- Winifred Merrill, photographed in 1925 by Arnold Genthe
- Born: July 24, 1898; Atlanta, Georgia
- Died: March 11, 1990 (aged 91); Illinois
- Occupations: Violinist, college professor

Winifred Merrill Warren (July 24, 1898 – March 11, 1990) was an American violinist and music educator, a professor of music at the Indiana University School of Music from 1938 to 1961.

== Early life ==
Winifred Merrill was born in Atlanta, Georgia, the daughter of Barzille Winfred Merrill and Mary Ann Neely Merrill. Her father was a violinist, a student of Joseph Joachim and Bernhard Ziehn; he taught music in Iowa and was founder and dean of the music department at Indiana University. She attended the Institute of Musical Art in New York, with further studies in Paris in 1932. Her teachers and mentors included Édouard Dethier, Franz Kneisel, Percy Goetschius, and Nadia Boulanger.

== Career ==
Winifred Merrill gave her first professional recital in 1925, in Iowa. She was a guest soloist with the Minneapolis Symphony Orchestra. She began teaching music at Indiana University in 1927. She became an assistant professor in 1938, after her father's retirement from the school. She formed the Indiana University Trio with two of her colleagues, Finnish cellist Lennart von Zweygberg and German pianist Ernest Hoffzimmer. She taught two summers in Munich with the Indiana University Summer Music School program. She gave a solo recital at Carnegie Hall in 1944. "Miss Merrill is obviously a musician who knows what she wants to do, and her intent and accomplishment were closely allied," reported one reviewer in 1950.

She wrote The Arthur Stories (1987), a book of stories about her husband.

== Personal life ==
Winifred Merrill married Arthur Warren in 1961, the year she retired from Indiana University. She died in 1990, aged 91 years, in Illinois. She left her violin to the Indiana University Foundation, for the use of violin students there.
