= Carol Shields =

Canadian writer

- Born: Carol Ann Warner; June 2, 1935; Oak Park, Illinois, US
- Died: July 16, 2003 (aged 68); Victoria, British Columbia, Canada
- Education: Hanover College (BA); University of Ottawa (MA)
- Occupation: Author
- Spouse: Donald Hugh Shields (m. 1957)
- Children: 5
- Writing career
- Period: 1972–2002

Carol Ann Shields (née Warner; June 2, 1935 – July 16, 2003) was a Canadian novelist and short story writer. Her 1993 novel The Stone Diaries, which won the U.S. Pulitzer Prize for Fiction as well as the Governor General's Award in Canada.

== Early life and education ==
Shields was born Carol Ann Warner in Oak Park, Illinois.

She began studying at Hanover College in Indiana in 1953 and became a member of the Alpha Delta Pi sorority. Two years later, a United Nations Scholarship enabled her to spend a year studying English literature at the University of Exeter in England. She then returned to Hanover, graduating with honours in history and education in 1957.

She returned to university in 1969, studying Canadian literature part-time at the University of Ottawa. She completed her master's degree in 1975. Her research on the novels of Canadian writer Susanna Moodie became the basis for her book Susanna Moodie: Voice and Vision, published in 1976.

In 1955, while on a British Council-sponsored study week in Scotland, she met a Canadian engineering student, Donald Hugh Shields. The couple married in 1957 and moved to Canada, where they had a son and four daughters. Shields later became a Canadian citizen.

== Literary career ==
Her first novel, Small Ceremonies, was published in 1976, followed by The Box Garden in 1977.

Shields' third novel, Happenstance, was published in 1980; that year, she and her husband settled in Winnipeg, Manitoba, after he was hired to teach in the University of Manitoba's Faculty of Engineering. It was here that Shields wrote her better-known books.

She published the novel Swann in 1987, and The Republic of Love in 1992. The Stone Diaries (1993) won the 1995 Pulitzer Prize for Fiction and the 1993 Governor General's Award, the only book to have ever received both awards. It won the U.S. National Book Critics Circle Award in 1994, and was nominated in 1993 for the Booker Prize. The Stone Diaries was named one of the best books of the year by Publishers Weekly. It was also chosen as a "Notable Book" by The New York Times Book Review, which wrote "The Stone Diaries reminds us again why literature matters."

Shields was the author of several short story collections, including Various Miracles (1985), The Orange Fish (1989), and Dressing Up for the Carnival (2000).

Shields also studied the works of Jane Austen. She wrote the biography entitled Jane Austen, which won the $25,000 Charles Taylor Prize for literary non-fiction in April 2002, an award accepted by her daughter Meg on her behalf in Toronto, on April 22, 2002.

Her last novel, Unless, contains a passionate defence of female writers who write of 'domestic' subjects.

Carol Shields wrote plays including Departures and Arrivals which has been performed hundreds of times by both amateur and professional theaters. Other celebrated plays include Thirteen Hand (1993), Fashion, Power, Guilt, and the Charity of Families (co-authored with daughter Catherine Shields)(1995), and Unless (with daughter Sara Cassidy) (2005). Collections of poems by Shields were published in 1972 Others, 1974 Intersect, and 1992 Coming to Canada.

Two collections of essays written by women about what they were not told became best sellers in Canada. Dropped Threads (2001) and Dropped Threads 2 (2003) were edited by Shields and her friend and colleague Marjorie Anderson.

== Academic career ==
In 1973, Shields became an editorial assistant for the journal Canadian Slavonic Papers. She taught creative writing at the University of Ottawa in 1977 and at the University of British Columbia after moving to Vancouver in 1978.

Later, Shields taught in the University of Manitoba's English department, first as an assistant professor. She became an associate professor in 1992 and full professor in 1995. In 1996, she became chancellor of the University of Winnipeg.

Shields was named professor emerita in 2000 following her retirement from the University of Manitoba.

== Death and legacy ==
Shields died in 2003 of breast cancer at age 68 in Victoria.

Following her death, six of her short stories were adapted by Shaftesbury Films into the dramatic anthology series The Shields Stories. Her earlier short story collections were republished as Collected Stories of Carol Shields in 2005. Films based on Carol Shields's novels include Swann (1996) and The Republic of Love (2003). Her final novel, Unless, was adapted as a play in 2016 by Alan Gilsenan.

In 2020, the Carol Shields Prize for Fiction was announced as a new literary award to honor writing by Canadian and American women and non-binary authors.

== Awards and honours ==
=== Literary awards ===
- 1976: Canadian Authors' Association Award for Small Ceremonies.
- 1983: CBC Annual Literary Competition award for the radio play Women Waiting.
- 1985: National Magazine Award for the short story "Mrs Turner Cutting the Grass".
- 1988: Arthur Ellis Award for Best Novel for Swann: A Mystery.
- 1990: Marian Engel Award for her body of work.
- 1993: Governor General's Award for English-language fiction for The Stone Diaries.
- 1994: McNally Robinson Book of the Year Award and Canadian Booksellers Association Prize for The Stone Diaries.
- 1994: National Book Critics Circle Award for Fiction for The Stone Diaries.
- 1995: Pulitzer Prize for Fiction for The Stone Diaries.
- 1998: Orange Prize for Fiction for Larry's Party.
- 2002: Charles Taylor Prize for Literary Non-Fiction for Jane Austen.
- 2003: Canadian Booksellers Association Libris Author of the Year Award.
- 2003: Ethel Wilson Fiction Prize for Unless.

=== Literary award shortlists ===
- 1993: Booker Prize for The Stone Diaries.
- 1997: Giller Prize for Larry's Party.
- 2002: Booker Prize and Giller Prize for Unless.
- 2003: Orange Prize for Fiction for Unless.

=== Honours and fellowships ===
- 1998: Appointed an Officer of the Order of Canada.
- 1998: Elected a Fellow of the Royal Society of Canada.
- 1999: Awarded a Guggenheim Fellowship.
- 2000: Appointed a Chevalier of France's Ordre des Arts et des Lettres.
- 2001: Appointed to the Order of Manitoba.
- 2001: Named Winnipeg Citizen of the Year.
- 2002: Promoted to Companion of the Order of Canada.
- 2002: Awarded the Queen Elizabeth II Golden Jubilee Medal.
- 2021: Posthumously inducted into the Chicago Literary Hall of Fame.

== Works ==
=== Novels ===
- 1976: Small Ceremonies.
- 1977: The Box Garden; later published with Small Ceremonies as Duet.
- 1980: Happenstance.
- 1982: A Fairly Conventional Woman; later published with Happenstance under the title Happenstance.
- 1987: Swann: A Mystery; published in the United Kingdom as Mary Swann.
- 1991: A Celibate Season, with Blanche Howard.
- 1992: The Republic of Love.
- 1993: The Stone Diaries.
- 1997: Larry's Party.
- 2002: Unless.

=== Short story collections ===
- 1985: Various Miracles.
- 1989: The Orange Fish.
- 2000: Dressing Up for the Carnival.
- 2004: Collected Stories.

=== Poetry ===
- 1972: Others. Ottawa: Borealis Press.
- 1974: Intersect. Ottawa: Borealis Press.
- 1992: Coming to Canada. Ottawa: Carleton University Press.

=== Plays ===
- 1983: Women Waiting (radio play).
- 1990: Departures and Arrivals.
- 1993: Thirteen Hands.
- 1995: Fashion, Power, Guilt, and the Charity of Families, with Catherine Shields.
- 1998: Anniversary: A Comedy, with Dave Williamson.
- 2002: Thirteen Hands and Other Plays. Toronto: Vintage.
- 2005: Unless, adapted with Sara Cassidy from Shields's novel.

=== Non-fiction ===
- 1976: Susanna Moodie: Voice and Vision (literary criticism). Ottawa: Borealis Press.
- 2001: Jane Austen (biography). New York: Viking.

=== Edited anthologies ===
- 2001: Dropped Threads: What We Aren't Told, edited with Marjorie Anderson. Toronto: Vintage.
- 2003: Dropped Threads 2: More of What We Aren't Told, edited with Marjorie Anderson. Toronto: Vintage.

=== Graphic novel ===
- 2016: Susanna Moodie: Roughing It in the Bush, adapted by Willow Dawson from a screenplay by Shields and Patrick Crowe; illustrated by Selena Goulding.

=== Adaptations by others ===
- 1996: Swann (film).
- 2001: Larry's Party: The Musical, with book and lyrics by Richard Ouzounian and music by Marek Norman, based on Shields's novel.
- 2003: The Republic of Love (film).
