= 1979 Toronto International Film Festival =

Annual Canadian film festival

- Festival poster
- Location: Toronto, Ontario, Canada
- Hosted by: Toronto International Film Festival Group
- Festival date: September 6, 1979–September 15, 1979
- Language: English
- Website: tiff.net
- 1980 1978

The 4th Toronto International Film Festival (TIFF) took place in Toronto, Ontario, Canada between September 6 and September 15, 1979. Due to overcrowding in the prior year, the Gala presentations were moved from the 700-seat Towne Cinema to the 1,600-seat Elgin Theatre. The People's Choice Award was awarded to Best Boy by Ira Wohl, which later won Oscar for Best Documentary Feature.

== Awards ==
Award	Film	Director
People's Choice Award	Best Boy	Ira Wohl

== Programme ==
This year The American Nightmare retrospective on American horror films was organized by Canadian critic Robin Wood and Richard Lippe. Brian De Palma and George A. Romero attended the retrospective as guests. Also this year Industry programme trade forum was started by festival, which continued till 1991. The festival featured a special programme of films from Sweden, with Jörn Donner, the head of the Swedish Film Institute, and nine Swedish filmmakers attending.

=== Gala Presentations ===
- An Adventure for Two by Claude Lelouch
- ...And Justice for All. by Norman Jewison
- Black Jack by Ken Loach
- Fish Hawk by Donald Shebib
- The Heritage by Anders Refn
- Legend of the Mountain by King Hu
- Linus and the Mysterious Red Brick House by Vilgot Sjöman
- Magicians of the Silver Screen by Jiří Menzel
- The Magician of Lublin by Menahem Golan
- A Man, a Woman, and a Bank by Noel Black
- The Marriage of Maria Braun by Rainer Werner Fassbinder
- The Onion Field by Harold Becker
- Orchestra Rehearsal by Federico Fellini
- Quadrophenia by Franc Roddam
- Something Short of Paradise by David Helpern
- The Tempest by Derek Jarman
- Time After Time by Nicholas Meyer

=== Critics Choice ===
- 50/50 by Uwe Brandner
- Bastien, Bastienne by Michel Andrieu
- Drugstore Romance by Paul Vecchiali
- Germany in Autumn by Alf Brustellin, Hans Peter Cloos, Rainer Werner Fassbinder, Alexander Kluge, Beate Mainka-Jellinghaus, Maximiliane Mainka, Edgar Reitz, Katja Rupé, Volker Schlöndorff, Peter Schubert and Bernhard Sinkel
- Knife in the Head by Reinhard Hauff
- Northern Lights by John Hanson and Rob Nilsson
- To an Unknown God by Jaime Chávarri
- To Be Sixteen by Jean Pierre Lefebvre

=== New Directions ===
- America's Sweetheart: The Mary Pickford Story by John Edwards
- Arthur Miller on Home Ground by Harry Rasky
- Blue Winter by André Blanchard
- Radio On by Christopher Petit
- The Sailor's Return by Jack Gold
- Scum by Alan Clarke
- Summer's Children by Julius Kohanyi
- Title Shot by Les Rose

=== Documentaries ===
- Best Boy by Ira Wohl
- Chiefs by Richard Leacock
- Chronicle of a Summer by Jean Rouch
- The Drugstore by Joris Ivens
- The Football Incident by Joris Ivens
- The Handmaidens of God by Diane Létourneau
- Juvenile Court by Frederick Wiseman
- Juvenile Liaison by Nick Broomfield
- La La, Making It in L.A. by Frank Mouris and Caroline Mouris
- Salesman by Albert Maysles, David Maysles and Charlotte Zwerin
- The Snowshoers (Les Raquetteurs) by Michel Brault and Gilles Groulx
- Solzhenitsyn's Children Are Making a Lot of Noise in Paris by Michael Rubbo
- This Will Do for Today by Martin Lavut

=== Special Screenings ===
- Dinner for Adele by Oldřich Lipský
- Let's Talk About Love by Jean-Claude Lord
- Molière by Ariane Mnouchkine
- Stone Cold Dead by George Mendeluk
- Tierra y libertad by Maurice Bulbulian

=== Buried Treasures ===
- The Confessions of Amans by Gregory Nava
- Faster, Pussycat! Kill! Kill! by Russ Meyer
- The Friends of Eddie Coyle by Peter Yates
- The Green Wall by Armando Robles Godoy
- Night Moves by Arthur Penn
- Ruby by Dick Bartlett
- The Scenic Route by Mark Rappaport
- The Super Inframan by Hua Shan
- Who's That Knocking at My Door by Martin Scorsese

=== Swedish Cinema ===
- The Man on the Roof by Bo Widerberg
- Men Can't Be Raped by Jörn Donner
- Near and Far Away by Marianne Ahrne
- One and One by Erland Josephson, Sven Nykvist and Ingrid Thulin
- A Respectable Life by Stefan Jarl
- The Score by Christer Dahl
- Sven Klang's Combo by Stellan Olsson
- A Walk in the Sun by Hans Dahlberg
- The Walls of Freedom by Marianne Ahrne

=== German Cinema ===
- Bye-Bye Bavaria! by Herbert Achternbusch
- The Expulsion from Paradise by Niklaus Schilling
- The Main Actor by Reinhard Hauff
- Moritz, Dear Moritz by Hark Bohm
- On the Move by Adolf Winkelmann

=== Luce Guilbeault ===
A tribute program to Canadian actress and filmmaker Luce Guilbeault, featuring both films in which she performed and films she directed.

- Denyse Benoît, comedienne by Luce Guilbeault
- D'abord ménagères by Luce Guilbeault
- Passages by Nesya Shapiro Blue
- Réjeanne Padovani by Denys Arcand
- Some American Feminists by Luce Guilbeault

=== Marguerite Duras ===
Films directed by Marguerite Duras.

- Destroy, She Said
- India Song
- The Lorry
- La Musica
- Son nom de Venise dans Calcutta désert
