= Toronto International Film Festival People's Choice Award =

Canadian annual film award

The Toronto International Film Festival People's Choice Award is an annual film award, presented by the Toronto International Film Festival to the movie rated as the year's best film according to TIFF audience. Past sponsors of the award have included Cadillac and Grolsch.

The winners of this award have often later earned Academy Award nominations, to the point that the award is now considered to be effectively the "starting gun" of the Academy Award nominations race.

In 2009, the festival introduced separate People's Choice Awards for Documentaries and Midnight Madness. In 2015, it also introduced a People's Choice Award for its satellite Canada's Top Ten festival, which was discontinued after 2018 due to TIFF's decision to switch the Canada's Top Ten program from a dedicated festival to a series of week-long theatrical screenings.

The People's Choice awards can be won by any feature film in the entire festival program; apart from the distinct categories determining which award any given film is able to win, the program features no other distinctions between films that are or are not eligible for consideration. Despite this, the main People's Choice award has been most commonly, but not always, won by a Gala or Special Presentations film that had its world premiere at TIFF.

For the 2025 Toronto International Film Festival, TIFF announced plans to introduce a new International People's Choice Award for films from outside North America. While an international film can still be named winner of the main People's Choice Award, an international film that does so is removed from the international award standings to ensure that two different films are named. The awards otherwise maintain a distinction between international and North American films, such that an international film that was not the overall PCA winner would be named as a winner or runner-up for the international award rather than a runner-up for the main award.

== Process ==
At each film screening, attendees are invited to vote for the film as People's Choice after the show. Formerly conducted in the lobby of the theatre after the show, People's Choice voting is now conducted principally online, with voters' e-mail addresses cross-referenced against ticket registrations to ensure that the vote cannot be manipulated by people who have not actually seen the film at TIFF.

However, to ensure that the voting process does not bias the award toward films that screened in larger theatres and that a film's own cast and crew cannot stuff the ballot box, the overall number of votes received is also weighted against the size of the screening audience. For example, a film which screened in a smaller theatre, but had a highly passionate fan base, can have an advantage over a film that had a larger number of raw votes but a more mixed or uneven reception. Because each film is screened multiple times over the course of the entire festival, the process also enables the organizers to evaluate which films are generating more audience buzz, by virtue of a significant increase in attendance and/or People's Choice votes at the follow-up screenings.

Films that are in strong contention for the People's Choice Award will often, although not always, have extra screenings added to the program toward the end of the festival, although this does not necessarily guarantee that a film with added screenings will always make the top three, or that a film without added screenings is entirely out of the running.

After the award is announced, the festival offers several repeat screenings of the winner at the TIFF Lightbox on the final day of the festival.

== Winners and runners-up ==
The table below shows the People's Choice winners of past years in bold with highlighting. Prior to 2000, only the overall winner was named each year; in that year, the festival began announcing the first and second runners-up for the award as well. At the 2004 festival, no first or second runners-up were officially named for the People's Choice Award; however, festival director Piers Handling did provide the media with a list of numerous other films that had been in the running, including Crash, Gunner Palace, I, Claudia, Up and Down, 3-Iron, Ma Mère, The Holy Girl, Red Dust, Brides, Saving Face and Sideways. The festival named four runners-up rather than two in 2005, and only one runner-up in 2010, but has otherwise always named two runners-up for the award.

The table notes whether films have been winners or nominees for the Academy Award for Best Picture, Best Screenplay, Best Foreign Language Film or Best Documentary Feature.

Prior to the creation of the separate People's Choice Award for Documentaries, the main award was won by two documentary films, Best Boy in 1979 and Roger & Me in 1989.

On four occasions to date, the award has been won by a Canadian film. Two of those films, The Decline of the American Empire in 1986 and The Hanging Garden in 1997, were also named as the winners of the juried award for Best Canadian Film, although the 2007 winner Eastern Promises and the 2015 winner Room were not. All four films were also Best Picture nominees at the Genie Awards or the Canadian Screen Awards, which The Decline of the American Empire and Room won.

To date, Chloé Zhao is the only director ever to have won the top award twice, winning in 2020 for Nomadland and in 2025 for Hamnet.

Year	Film	Director(s)	Academy Award honours	Genie/CSA honours	Ref
1978	**Girlfriends**	**Claudia Weill**			
1979	**Best Boy**	**Ira Wohl**	Best Documentary Feature winner		
1980	**Bad Timing**	**Nicolas Roeg**			
1981	**Chariots of Fire**	**Hugh Hudson**	Best Picture winner Best Original Screenplay winner		
1982	**Tempest**	**Paul Mazursky**			
1983	**The Big Chill**	**Lawrence Kasdan**	Best Picture nominee Best Original Screenplay nominee		
1984	**Places in the Heart**	**Robert Benton**	Best Picture nominee Best Original Screenplay winner		
1985	**The Official Story (La historia oficial)**	**Luis Puenzo**	Best Foreign Language Film winner Best Original Screenplay nominee		
1986	**The Decline of the American Empire (Le déclin de l'empire américain)**	**Denys Arcand**	Best Foreign Language Film nominee	Best Picture winner	
1987	**The Princess Bride**	**Rob Reiner**			
1988	**Women on the Verge of a Nervous Breakdown (Mujeres al borde de un ataque de nervios)**	**Pedro Almodóvar**	Best Foreign Language Film nominee		
1989	**Roger & Me**	**Michael Moore**			
1990	**Cyrano de Bergerac**	**Jean-Paul Rappeneau**	Best Foreign Language Film nominee		
1991	**The Fisher King**	**Terry Gilliam**	Best Original Screenplay nominee		
1992	**Strictly Ballroom**	**Baz Luhrmann**			
1993	**The Snapper**	**Stephen Frears**			
1994	**Priest**	**Antonia Bird**			
1995	**Antonia**	**Marleen Gorris**	Best Foreign Language Film winner		
1996	**Shine**	**Scott Hicks**	Best Picture nominee Best Original Screenplay nominee		
1997	**The Hanging Garden**	**Thom Fitzgerald**		Best Picture nominee	
1998	**Life Is Beautiful (La vita è bella)**	**Roberto Benigni**	Best Picture nominee Best Foreign Language Film winner Best Original Screenplay nominee		
1999	**American Beauty**	**Sam Mendes**	Best Picture winner Best Original Screenplay winner		
2000	**Crouching Tiger, Hidden Dragon (卧虎藏龙)**	**Ang Lee**	Best Picture nominee Best Foreign Language Film winner Best Adapted Screenplay nominee		
2000	The Dish	Rob Sitch			
2000	Innocence	Paul Cox			
2000	Billy Elliot	Stephen Daldry	Best Original Screenplay nominee		
2001	**Amélie (Le fabuleux destin d'Amélie Poulain)**	**Jean-Pierre Jeunet**	Best Foreign Language Film nominee Best Original Screenplay nominee		
2001	Maya	Digvijay Singh			
2001	Monsoon Wedding	Mira Nair			
2002	**Whale Rider**	**Niki Caro**			
2002	Bowling for Columbine	Michael Moore	Best Documentary Feature winner		
2002	Bend It Like Beckham	Gurinder Chadha			
2003	**Zatōichi**	**Takeshi Kitano**			
2003	Go Further	Ron Mann		Best Documentary nominee	
2003	The Corporation	Mark Achbar and Jennifer Abbott		Best Documentary winner	
2004	**Hotel Rwanda**	**Terry George**	Best Original Screenplay nominee		
2005	**Tsotsi**	**Gavin Hood**	Best Foreign Language Film winner		
2005	Live and Become	Radu Mihaileanu			
2005	Dreamer	John Gatins			
2005	Brokeback Mountain	Ang Lee	Best Picture nominee Best Adapted Screenplay winner		
2005	Mother of Mine	Klaus Härö			
2006	**Bella**	**Alejandro Gómez Monteverde**			
2006	My Best Friend (Mon meilleur ami)	Patrice Leconte			
2006	Dixie Chicks: Shut Up and Sing	Barbara Kopple and Cecilia Peck			
2007	**Eastern Promises**	**David Cronenberg**		Best Picture nominee	
2007	Juno	Jason Reitman	Best Picture nominee Best Original Screenplay winner		
2007	Body of War	Ellen Spiro and Phil Donahue			
2008	**Slumdog Millionaire**	**Danny Boyle**	Best Picture winner Best Adapted Screenplay winner		
2008	More Than a Game	Kristopher Belman			
2008	The Stoning of Soraya M	Cyrus Nowrasteh			
2009	**Precious: Based on the Novel 'Push' by Sapphire**	**Lee Daniels**	Best Picture nominee Best Adapted Screenplay winner		
2009	Mao's Last Dancer	Bruce Beresford			
2009	Micmacs	Jean-Pierre Jeunet			
2010	**The King's Speech**	**Tom Hooper**	Best Picture winner Best Original Screenplay winner		
2010	The First Grader	Justin Chadwick			
2011	**Where Do We Go Now?** (وهلّأ لوين؟)	**Nadine Labaki**			
2011	Starbuck	Ken Scott			
2011	A Separation	Asghar Farhadi	Best Foreign Language Film winner Best Original Screenplay nominee		
2012	**Silver Linings Playbook**	**David O. Russell**	Best Picture nominee Best Adapted Screenplay nominee		
2012	Argo	Ben Affleck	Best Picture winner Best Adapted Screenplay winner		
2012	Zaytoun	Eran Riklis			
2013	**12 Years a Slave**	**Steve McQueen**	Best Picture winner Best Adapted Screenplay winner		
2013	Philomena	Stephen Frears	Best Picture nominee Best Adapted Screenplay nominee		
2013	Prisoners	Denis Villeneuve			
2014	**The Imitation Game**	**Morten Tyldum**	Best Picture nominee Best Adapted Screenplay winner		
2014	Learning to Drive	Isabel Coixet			
2014	St. Vincent	Theodore Melfi			
2015	**Room**	**Lenny Abrahamson**	Best Picture nominee Best Adapted Screenplay nominee	Best Picture Winner	
2015	Angry Indian Goddesses	Pan Nalin			
2015	Spotlight	Tom McCarthy	Best Picture winner Best Original Screenplay winner		
2016	**La La Land**	**Damien Chazelle**	Best Picture nominee Best Original Screenplay nominee		
2016	Lion	Garth Davis	Best Picture nominee Best Adapted Screenplay nominee		
2016	Queen of Katwe	Mira Nair			
2017	**Three Billboards Outside Ebbing, Missouri**	**Martin McDonagh**	Best Picture nominee Best Original Screenplay nominee		
2017	I, Tonya	Craig Gillespie			
2017	Call Me by Your Name	Luca Guadagnino	Best Picture nominee Best Adapted Screenplay winner		
2018	**Green Book**	**Peter Farrelly**	Best Picture winner Best Original Screenplay winner		
2018	If Beale Street Could Talk	Barry Jenkins	Best Adapted Screenplay nominee		
2018	Roma	Alfonso Cuarón	Best Picture nominee Best Foreign Language Film winner Best Original Screenplay nominee		
2019	**Jojo Rabbit**	**Taika Waititi**	Best Picture nominee Best Adapted Screenplay winner		
2019	Marriage Story	Noah Baumbach	Best Picture nominee Best Original Screenplay nominee		
2019	Parasite	Bong Joon-ho	Best Picture winner Best International Feature Film winner Best Original Screenplay winner		
2020	**Nomadland**	**Chloé Zhao**	Best Picture winner Best Adapted Screenplay nominee		
2020	One Night in Miami...	Regina King	Best Adapted Screenplay nominee		
2020	Beans	Tracey Deer		Best Picture winner	
2021	**Belfast**	**Kenneth Branagh**	Best Picture nominee Best Original Screenplay winner		
2021	Scarborough	Shasha Nakhai, Rich Williamson		Best Picture winner	
2021	The Power of the Dog	Jane Campion	Best Picture nominee Best Adapted Screenplay nominee		
2022	**The Fabelmans**	**Steven Spielberg**	Best Picture nominee Best Original Screenplay nominee		
2022	Women Talking	Sarah Polley	Best Picture nominee Best Adapted Screenplay winner		
2022	Glass Onion: A Knives Out Mystery	Rian Johnson	Best Adapted Screenplay nominee		
2023	**American Fiction**	**Cord Jefferson**	Best Picture nominee Best Adapted Screenplay winner		
2023	The Holdovers	Alexander Payne	Best Picture nominee Best Original Screenplay nominee		
2023	The Boy and the Heron	Hayao Miyazaki	Best Animated Feature winner		
2024	**The Life of Chuck**	**Mike Flanagan**			
2024	Emilia Pérez	Jacques Audiard	Best Picture nominee Best International Feature Film nominee Best Adapted Screenplay nominee		
2024	Anora	Sean Baker	Best Picture winner Best Original Screenplay winner		
2025	**Hamnet**	**Chloé Zhao**	Best Picture nominee Best Adapted Screenplay nominee		
2025	Frankenstein	Guillermo del Toro	Best Picture nominee Best Adapted Screenplay nominee		
2025	Wake Up Dead Man	Rian Johnson			
2026	**La bola negra**	**Javier Calvo** and **Javier Ambrossi**			
2026	I Play Rocky	Peter Farrelly			
2026	Being Heumann	Sian Heder			
