= Ira Wohl =

American documentary filmmaker

Ira Wohl is an American documentary filmmaker. He is most noted for his 1979 film Best Boy, which won the Academy Award for Best Documentary Feature at the 52nd Academy Awards.

Born and raised in New York City, Wohl attended Forest Hills High School. He had his first job in film working as an apprentice editor on Orson Welles's unfinished film Don Quixote in Madrid, Spain He then made a number of short films, worked on the television series Big Blue Marble, worked with John Lennon on a music video, then made Best Boy.

Best Boy premiered at the 1979 Toronto International Film Festival, where it won the festival's only prize-People's Choice Award before a separate People's Choice Award was instituted for the festival's documentary stream. He received a Guggenheim Fellowship in 1980.

Wohl later returned to school at the University of Southern California (USC)in the early 1990s, studying clinical social work He has been a psychotherapist for the students of the University of California, Los Angeles(UCLA) for more than twenty years.

In 1997, he released the sequel film Best Man: 'Best Boy' and All of Us Twenty Years Later. In 2006, he released another follow-up film, titled Best Sister.
