= Best Boy (1979 film) =

1979 film by Ira Wohl

- Directed by: Ira Wohl
- Written by: Ira Wohl
- Produced by: Ira Wohl
- Cinematography: Tom McDonough
- Distributed by: International Film Exchange
- Release date: 1979
- Running time: 110 minutes
- Country: United States

Best Boy is a 1979 American documentary made by Ira Wohl. The film received critical acclaim, and won many awards including the Academy Award for Best Documentary Feature.

The film won the People's Choice Award at the 4th Toronto International Film Festival.

== Summary ==
The film follows Philly Wohl, Ira's mentally handicapped cousin, who at that time was 52 years old and still living with his elderly parents. Ira forces his aunt and uncle to realize that they will not be around to care for Philly forever, and that they must start making preparations for when that time should come. Philly then begins to attend classes in New York City to learn how to take care of himself and become independent.

Philly's father, Max Wohl, dies during the course of the film. His mother, Pearl, died in 1980. Philly, himself, died in late April, 2020, at the age of 92. Zero Mostel died in 1977, and the film was dedicated to his memory.

== Release ==
Best Boy premiered at the 1979 Toronto International Film Festival, where it was one of two documentary films (alongside Michael Moore's Roger & Me ten years later) to win the festival's People's Choice Award before a separate People's Choice Award was instituted for the festival's documentary stream.

== Reception ==
Writing in New York, David Denby called Best Boy "a remarkably powerful film" with "an undercurrent of humor". In Film News, Jack Neher described Best Boy as "a beautifully detailed and very moving portrait of a family undergoing profound change". In Commonweal, Colin Westerbeck wrote "It's difficult to describe the documentary that Ira Wohl has made about his cousin Philly in terms that aren't cliches. Best Boy is a movie that's "heartwarming." It's that rare film which is able to remove the quotation marks from such terms and leave us, for once, unembarrassed to use them."

In addition to the Academy Award, Best Boy won the New York Film Critics Circle Award for Best Documentary.

== Aftermath ==
A sequel titled Best Man: 'Best Boy' and All of Us, 20 Years Later, was produced in 1997. Following the sequel, Wohl released Best Sister in 2006, which rounded off the trilogy by looking at the effect Philly's sister had on his current life.
