= Christer Boustedt =

Swedish actor and musician

Christer Boustedt (21 March 1939 – 4 September 1986) was a Swedish musician and actor.

Boustedt was born in Bromma. He was primarily a jazz musician who played the saxophone, and contributed music to many Swedish films.

He was considered to be one of Sweden's most renowned jazz musicians of his time, and teamed up with several of the most famous musicians in the genre in Sweden and internationally. As an alto saxophone player he was much influenced by Charlie Parker and worked in the bebop tradition. This was especially signified on one of his most noticed albums: Blues, Ballads and Bebop (1985). He also had an acting career, and participated in a number of films, among them Made in Sweden (1969), the award winning Sven Klangs Kvintett (Sven Klang's Combo, 1976) and Göta kanal eller Vem drog ur proppen? (1981). He died in Alfta, Ovanåker Municipality.

== Albums ==
- Plays Thelonious Mon (1983)
- Blues, Ballads and Bebop (1985)
- The Essence Of George Russell (1986)

== Selected filmography ==
- Made in Sweden (1969)
- Blushing Charlie (1970)
- Sven Klang's Combo (1976)
- Göta kanal eller Vem drog ur proppen? (1981)
- Annika (TV series, 1984)
- Lykkeland (1984)
