= Adolf Winkelmann (film director) =

German film director, producer and screenwriter

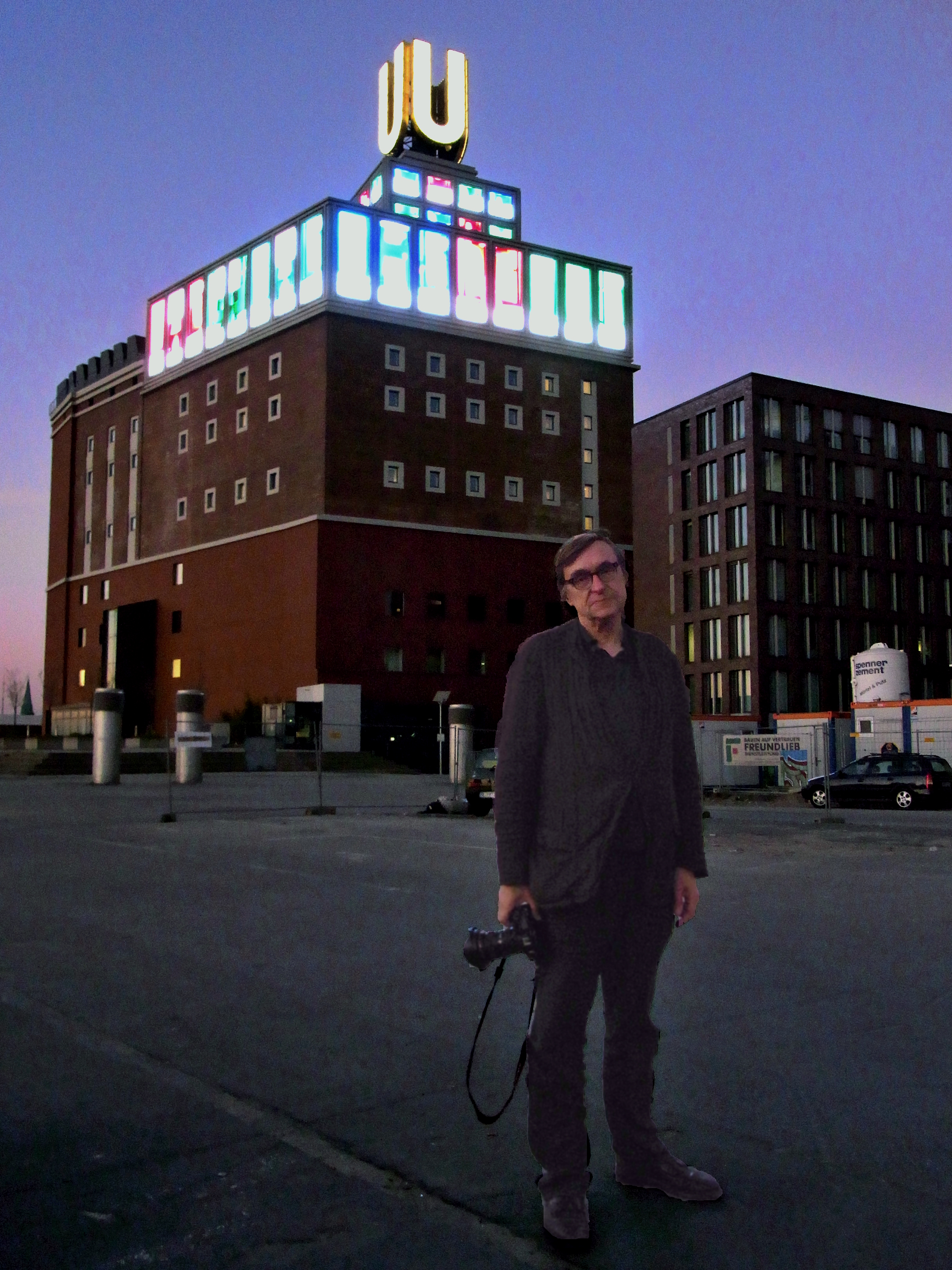
- Winkelmann on 10 October 2010 in front of his video installation at the "Dortmunder U"
- Born: Adolf Winkelmann; 10 April 1946 (age 80); Hallenberg, Germany
- Occupation: Film director
- Years active: 1967–present
- Awards: 1979 German Film Award (silver) for On the Move; 1981 German Film Award for Best Fiction Film for A Lot of Bills to Pay; 1993 German Film Award (gold) for North Curve; 1997 Adolf Grimme Award for The Last Courier; 1997 Baden-Baden TV Film Festival (teleplay) for The Last Courier; 2008 German Television Award for Contergan; 2008 Romy for Contergan; 2009 Gold World Medal of New York Festival for Contergan
- Website: Official website

Adolf Winkelmann (born 10 April 1946) is a German film director, film producer and screenwriter. He is also a professor of film design (concept and design) in the department of design at the Dortmund University of Applied Sciences and Arts.

== Filmography ==
Films directed by Adolf Winkelmann:

- 1967: Kassel 9.12.1967 11H54 (short)
- 1967: 31 Sprünge (short)
- 1967: Es spricht Ruth Schmidt (short)
- 1969: Heinrich Viel (documentary)
- 1978: On the Move (Die Abfahrer)
- 1981: A Lot of Bills to Pay (Jede Menge Kohle)
- 1984: Super
- 1987: Bang! You're Dead!
- 1989: Der Leibwächter (TV film)
- 1992: North Curve
- 1994: Dangerous Games (TV film, based on a novel by Julian Rathbone)
- 1996: The Last Courier (TV film)
- 1999: Waschen, schneiden, legen
- 2004: Engelchen flieg (TV film)
- 2007: Das Leuchten der Sterne (TV film)
- 2007: Contergan (TV film)
- 2010: Fliegende Bilder for the Dortmund U-Tower
- 2016: Young Light (based on a novel by Ralf Rothmann)
