= Museum Ostwall =

Museum in Dortmund, Germany

Coordinates: 51°30′47″N 7°28′20″E

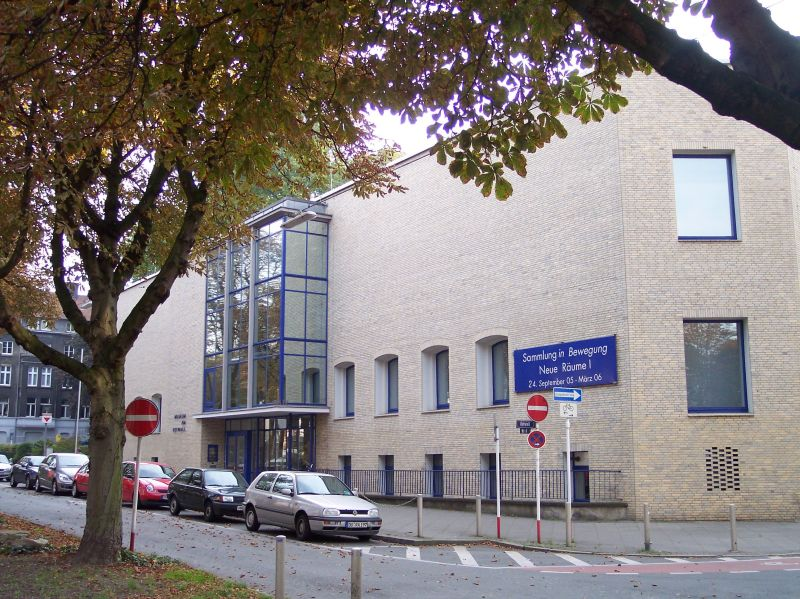
The old building

Museum Ostwall, Dortmund

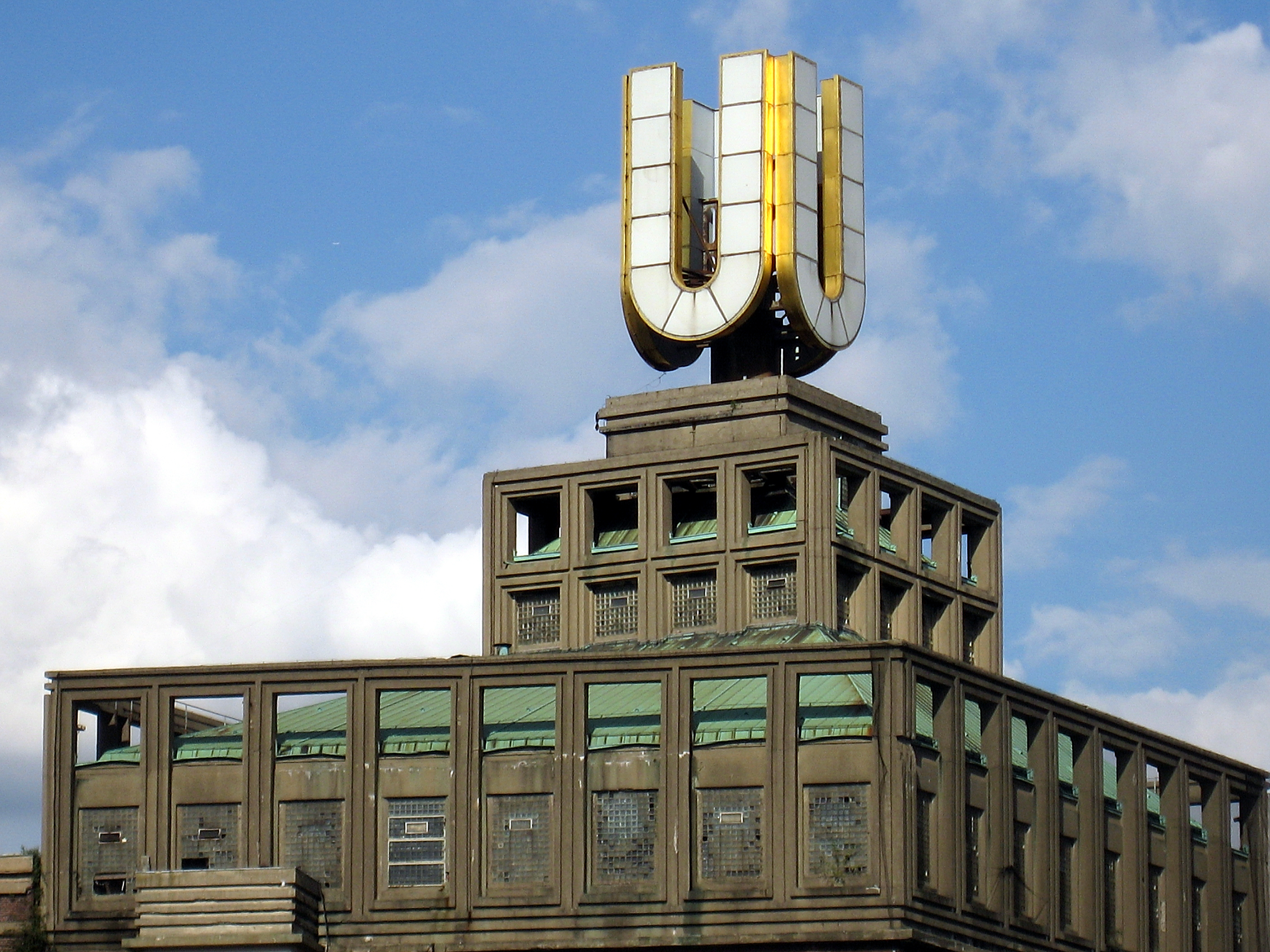
The Dortmund U-Tower, the museum's new home

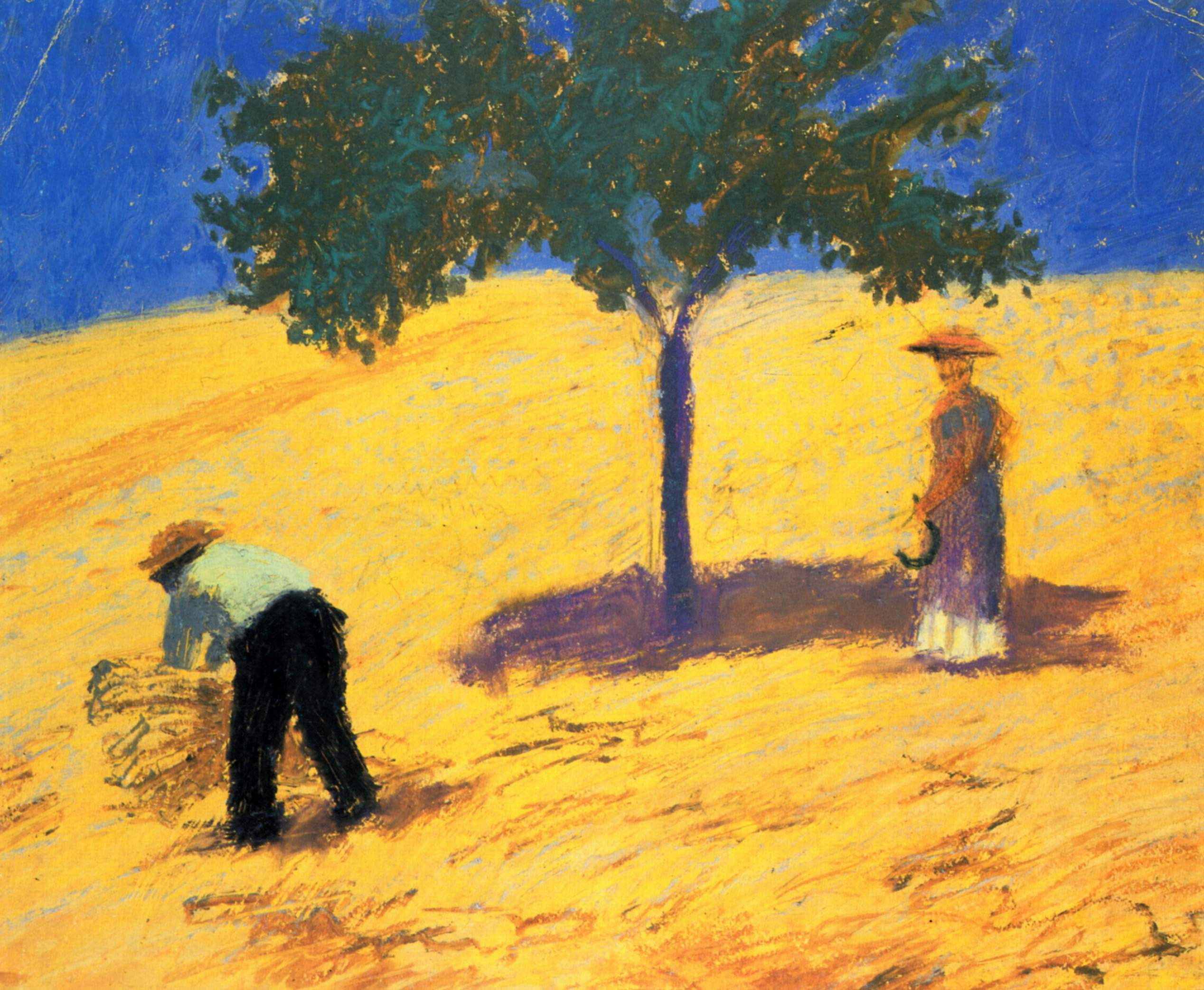
August Macke: Tree in Cornfield (1907)

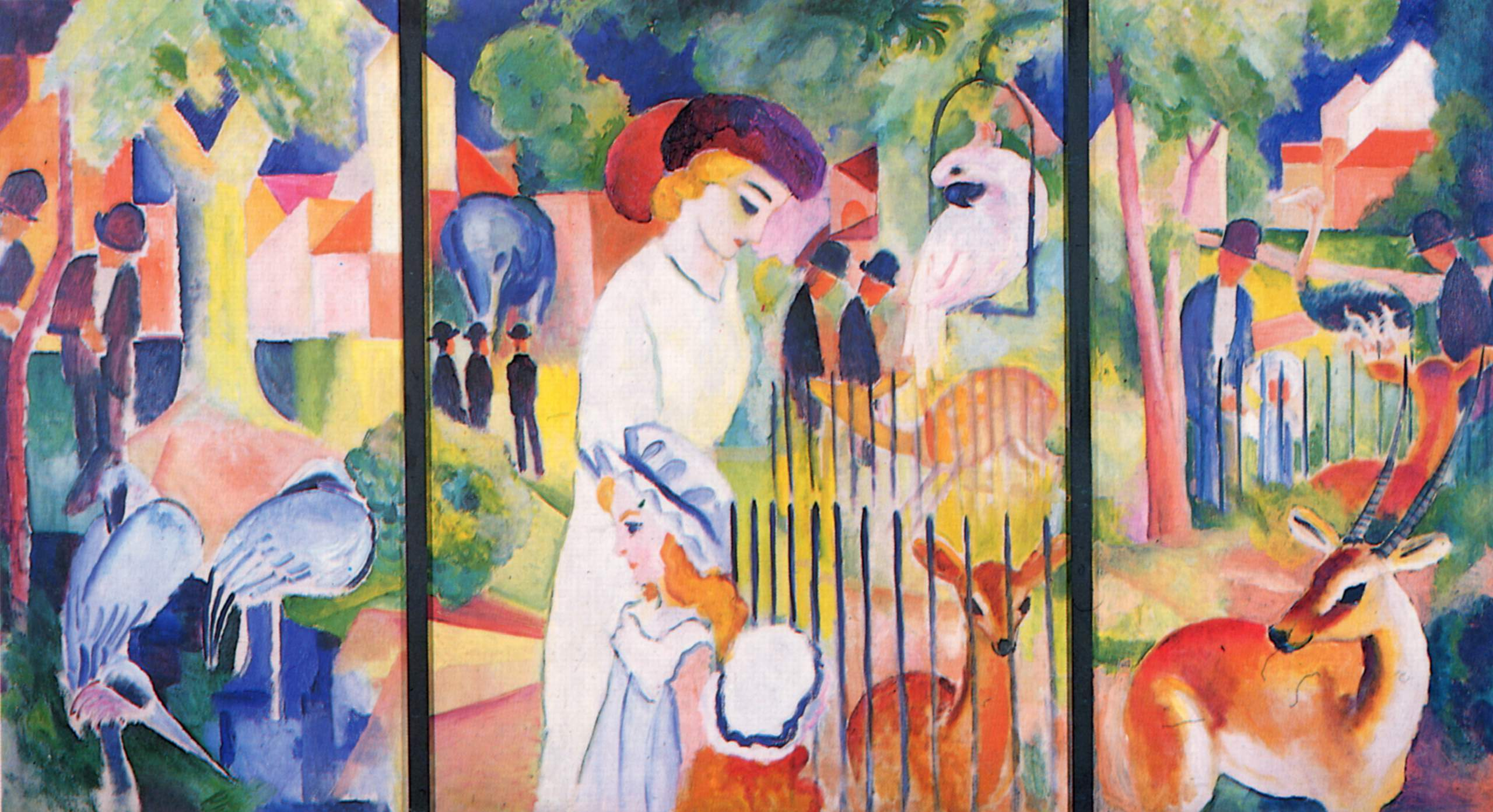
August Macke: Great Zoological Garden (triptych, 1913)

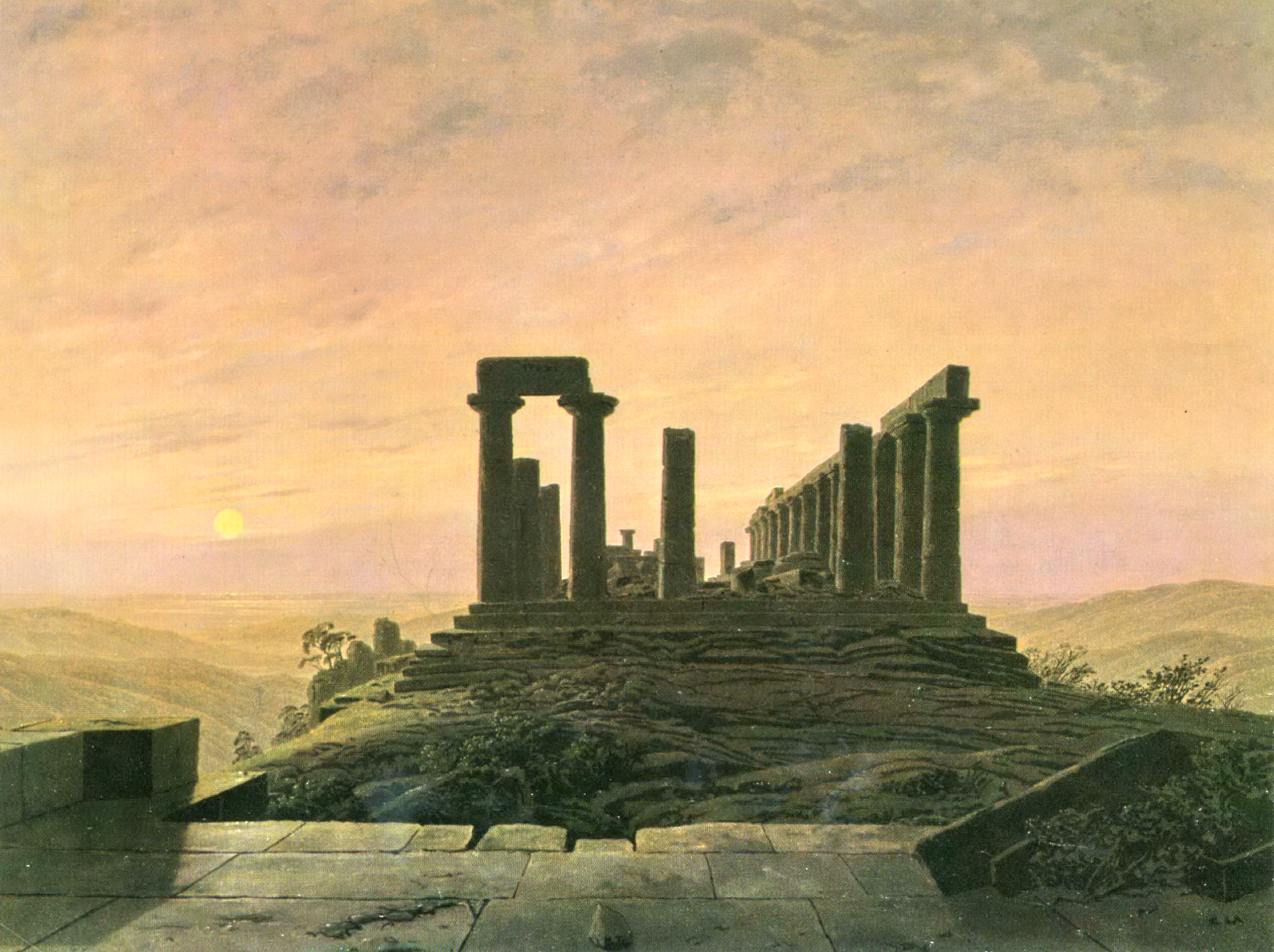
Caspar David Friedrich: The Temple of Juno in Agrigento (c.1828–1830)

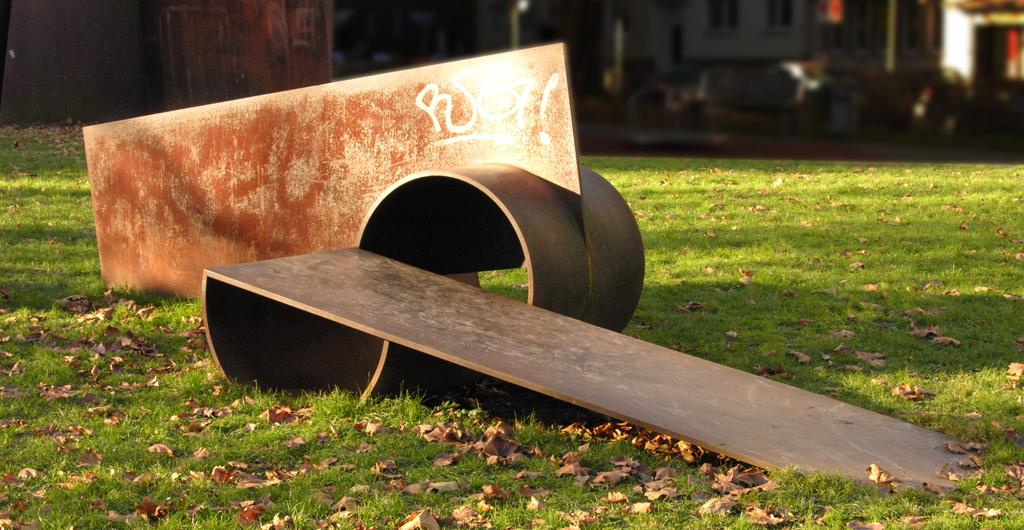
Steel sculpture by Heinz-Günter Prager in the old sculpture garden

The Museum Ostwall (known as Museum am Ostwall until 2010) is a museum of modern and contemporary art in Dortmund, Germany. It was founded in the late 1940s, and has been located in the Dortmund U-Tower since 2010. The collection includes paintings, sculptures, objects and photographs from the 20th century, plus over 2,500 graphics, spanning Expressionism through classic modern art to the present day.

== History ==
The museum's original location, from 1947 until 2009, was a building on the Ostwall (a road in central Dortmund following the old city walls), including a small sculpture garden. The previous building on the site had been the Museum für Kunst und Kulturgeschichte (MKK), a municipal art collection, from 1911 until its destruction in World War II; before 1911 it housed the old Westphalia Mining Authority.

A gradual rebuilding, using construction materials from the ruins of the MKK, began in the late 1940s. The first exhibition at the Museum am Ostwall was held in 1949 – making it one of Germany's first post-war museums of 20th-century art – and it continued to be expanded until 1956. The MKK, meanwhile, was provisionally rehomed in Cappenberg Castle until its return to Dortmund in 1983.

In June 2009 the original building closed its doors, and the museum began relocating into the Dortmund U-Tower, where it reopened under the new, shortened name Museum Ostwall in October 2010. The seven-storey tower, a former Dortmund Union brewery and warehouse, played a key role in the Ruhr Area's rebranding as "Culture Capital of Europe 2010" (RUHR.2010 – Kulturhauptstadt Europas). The museum reopened with the special exhibition "The Museum as Power Station" (Das Museum als Kraftwerk).

== Collection ==
The collection was initially compiled from works that the Nazis had classified as "degenerate art". The Gröppel Collection, containing around 200 paintings, sculptures and graphics, was acquired in 1957 and is now one of the keystones of the museum.

The collection includes works by Ernst Ludwig Kirchner, Otto Mueller, Emil Nolde and Karl Schmidt-Rottluff, who founded the movement Die Brücke in Dresden in 1905. The avant-garde Blaue Reiter group, started in 1912, is represented here by the works of Wassily Kandinsky, Franz Marc, August Macke and Alexej von Jawlensky. The collection of Jawlensky is the second-largest in Germany, after that of the Museum Wiesbaden.

The museum also owns 26 graphics by Pablo Picasso from the 1940s and '50s, plus others by Joan Miró, Marc Chagall and Salvador Dalí. The collection includes a single work each by Otto Dix, Lyonel Feininger, Alberto Giacometti, Paul Klee, Oskar Kokoschka and Oskar Schlemmer. Among the still lifes, the highlight is Christian Rohlfs.

In the early 1990s the museum acquired over 1,000 works from the collection of the artist Siegfried Cremer, by artists including Marcel Duchamp, Joseph Beuys, Nam June Paik, Wolf Vostell, Günther Uecker and Jean Tinguely, strengthening the museum's coverage of the Fluxus, ZERO and "informal art" movements.

== Activities ==
1962 saw the opening of a children's painting studio, one of the first such teaching projects in a museum. The "Youth Art Club" (Jugendkunstclub) gives youngsters the chance to visit exhibitions, meet artists, and produce their own works in the museum's studio. During the school holidays it also offers art workshops. Educational projects will continue in the new location.

The exhibition is changed twice a year, in order to present as many works as possible to the public.

The museum's old rooms provided a venue for touring concerts and matinees. The museum also publishes art books and catalogues, partly funded by the non-profit society "Friends of the Museum am Ostwall".
