= 13th Guldbagge Awards =

Annual Swedish film awards ceremony

- Date: 5 September 1977
- Site: Operakällaren, Stockholm, Sweden

Highlights
- Best Picture: The Man on the Roof

The 13th Guldbagge Awards ceremony, presented by the Swedish Film Institute, honored the best Swedish films of 1976 and 1977, and took place on 5 September 1977. The Man on the Roof directed by Bo Widerberg was presented with the award for Best Film.

== Awards ==
- Best Film: The Man on the Roof by Bo Widerberg
- Best Director: Marianne Ahrne for Near and Far Away
- Best Actor: Håkan Serner for The Man on the Roof and Bang!
- Best Actress: Birgitta Valberg for Summer Paradise
- Special Achievement: Sven Klang's Combo
