= D.O.A.: A Right of Passage =

- Directed by: Lech Kowalski
- Written by: Lech Kowalski, Chris Salewicz
- Produced by: Tom Forcade, Lech Kowalski, Mike...
- Starring: Sex Pistols; Generation X; The Rich Kids; Joe Strummer; Nancy Spungen
- Edited by: Val Kuklowsky
- Music by: Sex Pistols
- Distributed by: Tom Norman Films (US theatrical); Harmony Vision (US VHS)
- Release date: September 12, 1980 (TIFF)
- Running time: 95 min.
- Country: United States
- Language: English

D.O.A.: A Right of Passage is a 1980 rockumentary film directed by Lech Kowalski (his premiere film as a director) about the origin of punk rock. The rockumentary takes interview and concert footage of some of punk rock's earliest bands of the late 1970s scene. It features live performances by the Sex Pistols, The Dead Boys, Generation X (with Billy Idol), The Rich Kids, X-Ray Spex, and Sham 69, with additional music from The Clash, Iggy Pop, and Augustus Pablo.

The film was backed and presented by the magazine High Times. At the time, High Times was branching into music and film projects that aligned with punk’s anti-establishment ethos.

== Plot ==
The film centers around the Sex Pistols 1978 tour of the United States which ended with the group breaking up. The tour was the only one the group played in the U.S. during their original run. Film director Lech Kowalski followed them with handheld cameras through the clubs and bars of their seven-city Southern tour. Mixing this with footage of other contemporary bands, trends in the fashion capitals, and punks of all shapes and colors, Kowalski created a grainy, stained snapshot of a movement at its peak, showing how certain authority figures saw the movement as a threat.

It features interview footage (including the famous interview of Sid Vicious and Nancy Spungen in bed), and behind the scenes shots from the tour as well as interviews with audience members who had strong and widely varied reactions to the group.

The majority of the material surrounds the Pistols tour as well but it also included other performances by first wave Punk acts such as The Dead Boys and Generation X with Billy Idol.

This indie film was shot mostly in bars and clubs on 16mm film, and documented early years of punk from both in front of and behind the stage.

The film's poster is featured prominently in one scene of the 1981 film Neighbors. D.O.A. also featured in The Filth and the Fury, a 2000 rockumentary film about the Sex Pistols directed by Julien Temple, and in the 2002 television series Hollywood Rocks the Movies: The 1970s.

== Release ==
The film premiered at the 1980 Festival of Festivals, before having its commercial premiere on April 10, 1981 at the Waverly Theater in New York City.

The DVD was released in Japan in 2003. However it is released in Region 0.

In 2017, the film was released on Blu-ray as the inaugural release of the MVD Rewind Collection. On this edition, music has been rescored. The original Iggy Pop studio recordings of "Nightclubbing" and "Lust For Life" have been swapped out for live versions of the same songs. The film's end credits, which previously featured Augustus Pablo's "AP Special," now features a generic reggae instrumental.

== Cast (in alphabetical order) ==
- Stiv Bators as himself (The Dead Boys)
- Terry Chimes as himself (The Clash)
- The Clash as themselves
- Paul Cook as himself (Sex Pistols)
- The Dead Boys as themselves
- Generation X as themselves
- Jonathan Guinness as himself
- Topper Headon as himself (The Clash)
- Billy Idol as himself (Generation X)
- Tony James as himself (Generation X)
- Mick Jones as himself (The Clash)
- Steve Jones as himself (Sex Pistols)
- John Lydon as himself (Johnny Rotten)
- Glen Matlock as himself (The Rich Kids)
- Gene October as himself (Generation X)
- Augustus Pablo as himself
- Bernard Brooke Partridge as himself - Council Member
- Rich Kids as themselves
- Heidi Robinson as herself - Tour Manager
- Sex Pistols as themselves
- Sham 69 as themselves
- Paul Simonon as himself (The Clash)
- Nancy Spungen as herself
- Joe Strummer as himself (The Clash)
- Terry Sylvester as himself
- Terry and the Idiots as themselves
- Sid Vicious as himself
- Mary Whitehouse as herself - Anti-Smut Crusader
- X-Ray Spex as themselves

== Songs performed ==
The musical performances/tracks contained in the documentary are as follows:

1. "Nightclubbing" Written by Iggy Pop and David Bowie; performed by Iggy Pop
2. "Anarchy in the U.K." Written by Paul Cook, Steve Jones, Glen Matlock and John Lydon; performed by the Sex Pistols
3. "Oh Bondage Up Yours" Written by Poly Styrene; performed by X-Ray Spex
4. "God Save the Queen" Written by Paul Cook, Steve Jones, Glen Matlock and John Lydon; performed by the Sex Pistols
5. "Pretty Vacant" Written by Paul Cook, Steve Jones, Glen Matlock and John Lydon; performed by The Rich Kids
6. "Liar" Written by Paul Cook, Steve Jones, Glen Matlock and John Lydon; performed by the Sex Pistols
7. "Police and Thieves" Written by Lee "Scratch" Perry and Junior Murvin; performed by The Clash (CBS Records)
8. "Kiss Me Deadly" Written and performed by Generation X (Chrysalis Records)
9. "I Wanna Be Me" Written by Paul Cook, Steve Jones, Glen Matlock and John Lydon; performed by the Sex Pistols
10. "Lust for Life" Written by Iggy Pop and David Bowie; performed by Iggy Pop
11. "All This And More" Performed by The Dead Boys (Sire Records); recorded live by Joe Sutherland
12. "Pretty Vacant" Written by Paul Cook, Steve Jones, Glen Matlock and John Lydon; performed by the Sex Pistols
13. "No Fun" – Sex Pistols
14. "New York" Written by Paul Cook, Steve Jones, Glen Matlock and John Lydon; performed by the Sex Pistols
15. "Rip Off" Performed by Sham 69; recorded live at Roundhouse Studios
16. "Borstal Breakout" Performed by Sham 69; recorded live at Roundhouse Studios
17. "I Wanna Be a Dead Boy" performed by The Dead Boys
18. "Holidays in the Sun" – Sex Pistols
19. "Holidays in the Sun" Written by Paul Cook, Steve Jones, John Lydon and Sid Vicious; performed by The Sex Pistols
20. "E.M.I." Written by Paul Cook, Steve Jones, Glen Matlock and John Lydon; performed by the Sex Pistols
21. "Bodies" Written by Paul Cook, Steve Jones, John Lydon and Sid Vicious; performed by the Sex Pistols
22. "A. P. Special" Written and performed by Augustus Pablo
