= Something Short of Paradise =

1979 film by David Helpern

- theatrical release poster
- Directed by: David Helpern
- Written by: Fred Barron
- Produced by: Lester Burman; James C. Gutman
- Starring: Susan Sarandon; David Steinberg
- Cinematography: Walter Lassally
- Edited by: Frank Bracht
- Music by: Mark Snow
- Distributed by: American International Pictures
- Release dates: September 14, 1979 (Toronto); October 5, 1979 (US)
- Running time: 87 minutes
- Country: United States
- Language: English
- Budget: $1 million

Something Short of Paradise (also known as Perfect Love) is a 1979 American romantic comedy film directed by David Helpern from a screenplay by Fred Barron. It stars Susan Sarandon and David Steinberg.

== Plot ==
Madeleine Ross (Susan Sarandon) is a journalist, and her boyfriend, Harris Sloane (David Steinberg), is the owner of an art theatre. Their relationship is on-again/off-again, and when Madeleine meets the French star Jean-Fidel Mileau (Jean-Pierre Aumont) it provokes changes in the way she and Harris feel about each other.

== Cast ==
- Susan Sarandon as Madeline Ross
- David Steinberg as Harris Sloane
- Jean-Pierre Aumont as Jean-Fidel Mileau
- Marilyn Sokol as Ruthie Miller
- Joe Grifasi as Barney Collins
- Robert Hitt as Edgar Kent
- Terrence O'Hara as Donny Conrad

== Production ==
Director David Helpern, Jr., and producer James C. Gutman became acquainted as faculty members at The Film School in Cambridge, Massachusetts, and initially teamed up to produce and direct two documentaries: I Am a Stranger Here Myself (1974), about director Nicholas Ray, and the Academy Award-nominated Hollywood on Trial, about the blacklist era. For their feature film debut, Helpern presented an idea for a classic love story, inspired by 1930s romantic comedies, to screenwriter Fred Barron, who had been Helpern’s story collaborator on the film, Between the Lines. Although the project failed to attract a Hollywood studio, Helpern and Gutman hired veteran film producer, Lester Berman, who advised the duo to switch location shooting from Boston to New York City, in order to stay within the $1 million budget and the twenty-seven day filming schedule. Susan Sarandon and David Steinberg each agreed to a reduction of their usual salaries and five percent of the box-office gross. During post-production, the filmmakers sold worldwide distribution rights to American International Pictures. Something Short of Paradise was shot in New York City, and was advertised with the tagline "Love isn't blind... just a little nearsighted!"

== Release ==
The film premiered at the Toronto International Film Festival on September 14, 1979.

== Reception ==
John Corry of The New York Times stated, "Something Short of Paradise is about a romance so whimsical, so fey and so pointless that it almost doesn't exist", criticizing the lack of chemistry between the leads and the screenplay.

Gary Arnold of The Washington Post wrote "Neither off-putting nor distinctive, the characters barely exist as figments of Barron's undernourished imagination."

Roger Ebert and Gene Siskel also both gave the film thumbs down on their TV series, negatively comparing it to Annie Hall.
