= Jan Erik Lindqvist =

Swedish actor

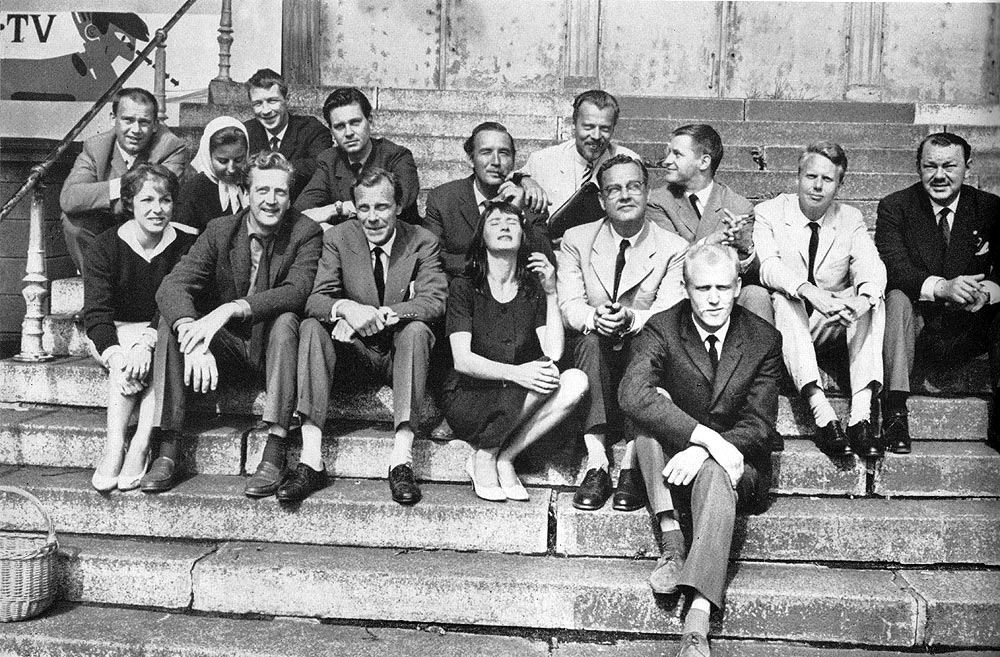
- Lindqvist (back row, fourth from the left) in 1961
- Born: 25 July 1920; Stockholm, Sweden
- Died: 23 October 1988 (aged 68)
- Occupation: Actor
- Years active: 1942–1988

Jan Erik Lindqvist (25 July 1920 – 23 October 1988) was a Swedish actor. He appeared in more than 70 films and television shows between 1942 and 1988.

== Selected filmography ==
- We House Slaves (1942)
- Realm of Man (1949)
- Dance in the Smoke (1954)
- The Red Horses (1954)
- A Lion in Town (1959)
- Siska (1962)
- Loving Couples (1964)
- Here's Your Life (1966)
- Face to Face (1976)
- Långt borta och nära (1976)
