= 1980 Toronto International Film Festival =

Annual Canadian film festival

- Festival poster
- Opening film: Loving Couples by Jack Smight
- Closing film: Divine Madness by Michael Ritchie
- Location: Toronto, Ontario, Canada
- Hosted by: Toronto International Film Festival Group
- Festival date: September 4, 1980–September 13, 1980
- Language: English
- Website: tiff.net
- 1981 1979

The 5th Toronto International Film Festival (TIFF) took place in Toronto, Ontario, Canada between September 4 and September 13, 1980. That year the festival hold a retrospective in honor of Jean-Luc Godard, who himself attended the retrospective which was organized by festival programmer Peter Harcourt. A large crowd gathered outside University theatre to catch a glimpse of Bette Midler at the premiere of her film Divine Madness.

== Awards ==
Award	Film	Director
People's Choice Award	Bad Timing	Nicolas Roeg

== Programme ==
=== Galas ===
- Bad Timing by Nicolas Roeg
- The Conductor by Andrzej Wajda
- Death Watch by Bertrand Tavernier
- Head On by Michael Grant
- Loving Couples by Jack Smight
- Loulou by Maurice Pialat
- Mr. Patman by John Guillermin
- Resurrection by Daniel Petrie
- Suzanne by Robin Spry

=== Special Screenings ===
- A Distant Cry from Spring by Yoji Yamada
- Le Fils puni by Philippe Collin
- My Sister the Negro by Dirk Jan Braat
- Oblomov by Nikita Mikhalkov
- Portrait of Teresa by Pastor Vega
- Royal Vacation by Gabriel Auer

=== Critic's Choice ===
- Afternoon of War by Karl Francis
- Anthracite by Édouard Niermans
- The Buck's Party by Steve Jodrell
- Dear Boys by Paul de Lussanet
- The Demise of Herman Durer by Leon de Winter
- Exterior Night by Jacques Bral
- Fernand by René Féret
- House of the Lute by Shing-Hon Lau
- In for Treatment by Erik van Zuylen and Marja Kok
- Instant Pictures by George Schouten
- Jaguar by Lino Brocka
- The Last Years of Childhood by Norbert Kückelmann
- Listen to the Lion by Henri Safran
- Order by Sohrab Shahid-Saless
- Palm Beach by Albie Thoms
- The Secret of Nikola Tesla by Krsto Papić
- Simone Barbes or Virtue by Marie-Claude Treilhou
- The Strange Case of Rachel K by Óscar Valdés
- The Willi Busch Report by Niklaus Schilling

=== New Music ===
- AC/DC: Let There Be Rock by Eric Dionysius and Eric Mistler
- Blue Suede Shoes by Curtis Clark
- Cha Cha by Herbert Curiel
- D.O.A.: A Rite of Passage by Lech Kowalski
- The Great Rock 'n' Roll Swindle by Julien Temple
- Reggae Sunsplash by Stefan Paul
- The Space Movie by Tony Palmer

=== Less Is More ===
- Billy in the Lowlands by Jan Egleson
- Clarence and Angel by Robert Gardner
- Gal Young Un by Victor Nuñez
- Good Riddance by Francis Mankiewicz
- The Handyman by Micheline Lanctôt
- Heartland by Richard Pearce
- Parallels by Mark Schoenberg
- Return of the Secaucus 7 by John Sayles
- Union City by Marcus Reichert
- The Whole Shootin' Match by Eagle Pennell

=== Buried Treasures ===
- All I Desire by Douglas Sirk
- Force of Evil by Abraham Polonsky
- The Killing of a Chinese Bookie by John Cassavetes
- Letter from an Unknown Woman by Max Ophüls
- Mouchette by Robert Bresson
- The Mouth Agape by Maurice Pialat

=== French Cinema ===
- Le Coup de sirocco by Alexandre Arcady
- Courage fuyons by Yves Robert
- L'Enfant roi by René Féret
- My Dearest by Marie-Christine Barrault
- The Rascals by Bernard Revon
- The Red Sweater by Michel Drach

=== Real to Reel ===
- As If It Were Yesterday by Myriam Abramowicz and Esther Hoffenberg
- Divine Madness by Michael Ritchie
- Garlic Is as Good as Ten Mothers by Les Blank
- Lightning Over Water by Wim Wenders and Nicholas Ray
- Memories of Duke by Gary Keys
- Poto and Cabengo by Jean-Pierre Gorin
- The Murder of Pedralbes by Gonzalo Herralde
- Prostitute by Tony Garnett
- Temps morts by Claude Godard
- The Trials of Alger Hiss by John Lowenthal

=== Kidstuff ===
- Take Me Up to the Ball Game by Ken Stephenson
