= Marianne Ahrne =

Swedish film director (born 1940)

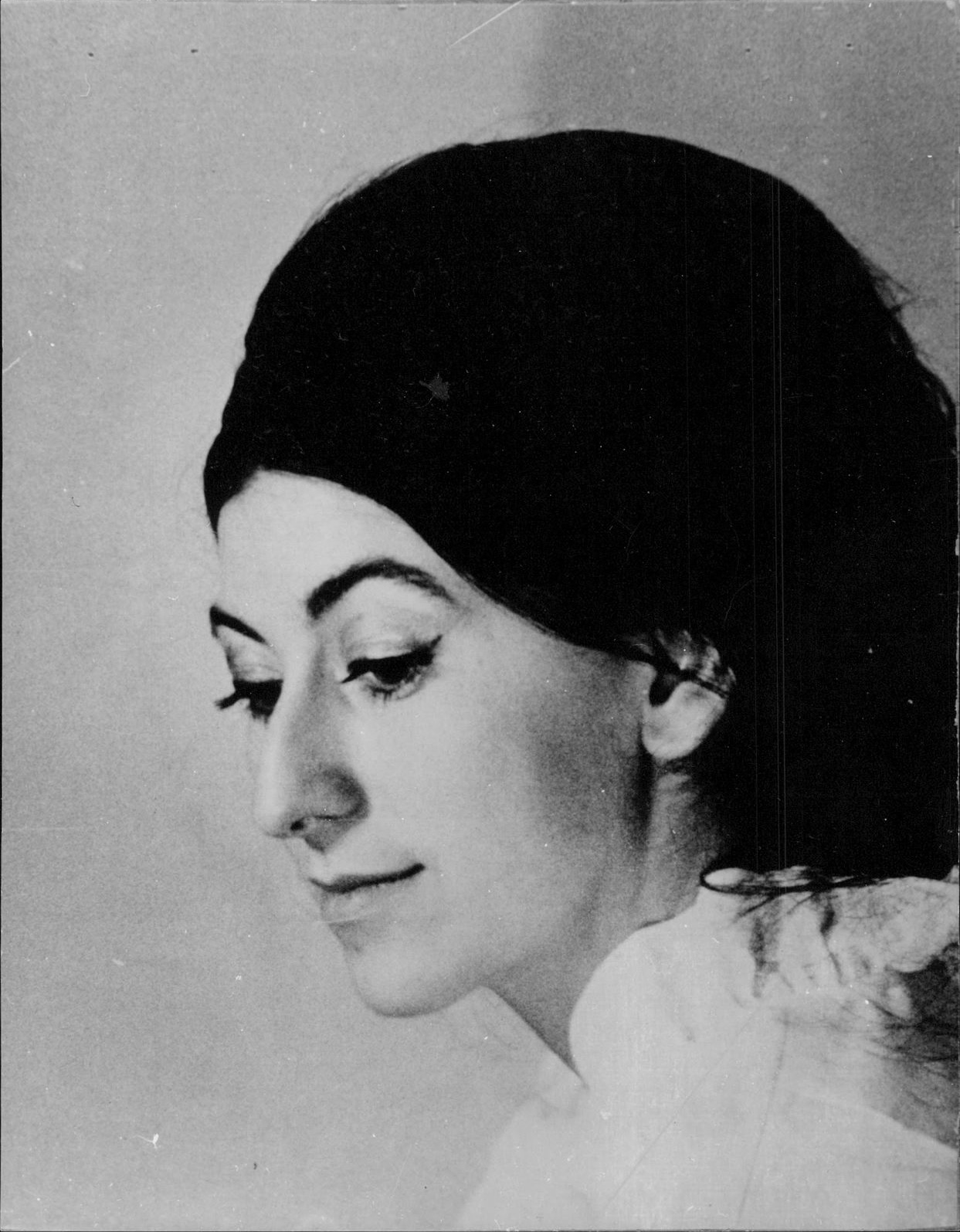
- Marianne Ahrne, c:a 1967.
- Born: Siv Marianne Ahrne; 25 May 1940 (age 85); Lund, Sweden
- Occupations: Film director; screenwriter
- Years active: 1970–present

Siv Marianne Ahrne (born 25 May 1940) is a Swedish film director and screenwriter. She has directed ten films between 1970 and 1997. Her 1976 film Långt borta och nära won the award for Best Director at the 13th Guldbagge Awards. Her 1978 film Frihetens murar was entered into the 11th Moscow International Film Festival. According to film historian Gwendolyn Audrey Foster, Ahrne was one of the first women to make documentary films in Sweden, and Foster noted that Ahrne's films have received little attention in the United States.

== Selected filmography ==
- Långt borta och nära (1976)
- Frihetens murar (1979)
- Flickan vid stenbänken (1989)
