= On the Move (film) =

1978 film by Adolf Winkelmann

- Die Abfahrer
- Directed by: Adolf Winkelmann
- Release date: 1978
- Country: West Germany
- Language: German

On the Move (German: Die Abfahrer) is a German film directed by Adolf Winkelmann. It was released in 1978.
