= Stellan Olsson =

Swedish film director (1936–2022)

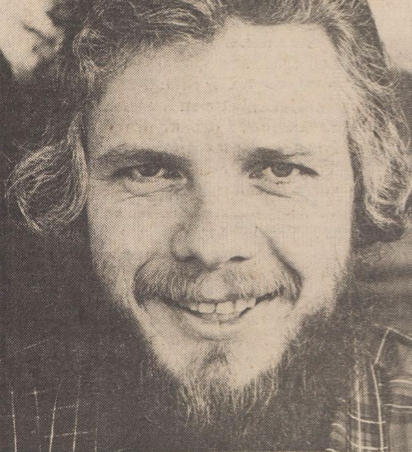
- Olsson in 1969
- Born: Paul Stellan Valter Olsson; 6 July 1936; Helsingborg, Sweden
- Died: 27 May 2022 (age 85); Helsingborg, Sweden
- Occupation: Film director

Stellan Olsson (6 July 1936 – 27 May 2022) was a Swedish film director. In 2012, his film Sven Klangs kvintett from 1976 was voted one of the 25 best Swedish films of all times.

== Death ==
Olsson died on 27 May 2022 at his home in Helsingborg, aged 85.

== Films ==
- 1966 – Irland
- 1969 – Oss emellan
- 1971 – Julia och nattpappan
- 1971 – Deadline
- 1974 – Pappa Pellerins dotter
- 1976 – Sven Klangs kvintett
- 1978 – Bevisbördan
- 1980 – Den enes död ...
- 1981 – Det finns inga smålänningar
- 1985 – Jane Horney
- 1991 – Den stora badardagen
- 1992 – Yasemin på flykt
- 1994 – Good Night Irene
- 1996 – Rose och drömmarna
