= Långt borta och nära =

1976 film

- Directed by: Marianne Ahrne
- Written by: Bertrand Hurault; Marianne Ahrne
- Produced by: Jörn Donner
- Starring: Lilga Kovanko
- Cinematography: Hans Welin
- Release date: 8 November 1976
- Running time: 98 minutes
- Country: Sweden
- Language: Swedish

Långt borta och nära (lit. 'Far away and near') is a 1976 Swedish drama film directed by Marianne Ahrne. Ahrne won the award for Best Director at the 13th Guldbagge Awards.

== Cast ==
- Lilga Kovanko as Mania
- Robert Farrant as Mutist
- Jan-Eric Lindquist as Stenius
- Helge Skoog as Jaeger
- Annicka Kronberg as Annicka
- Bodil Mårtensson as Bente
