= Dortmund U-Tower =

Former brewery building in Dortmund, Germany

U-Tower
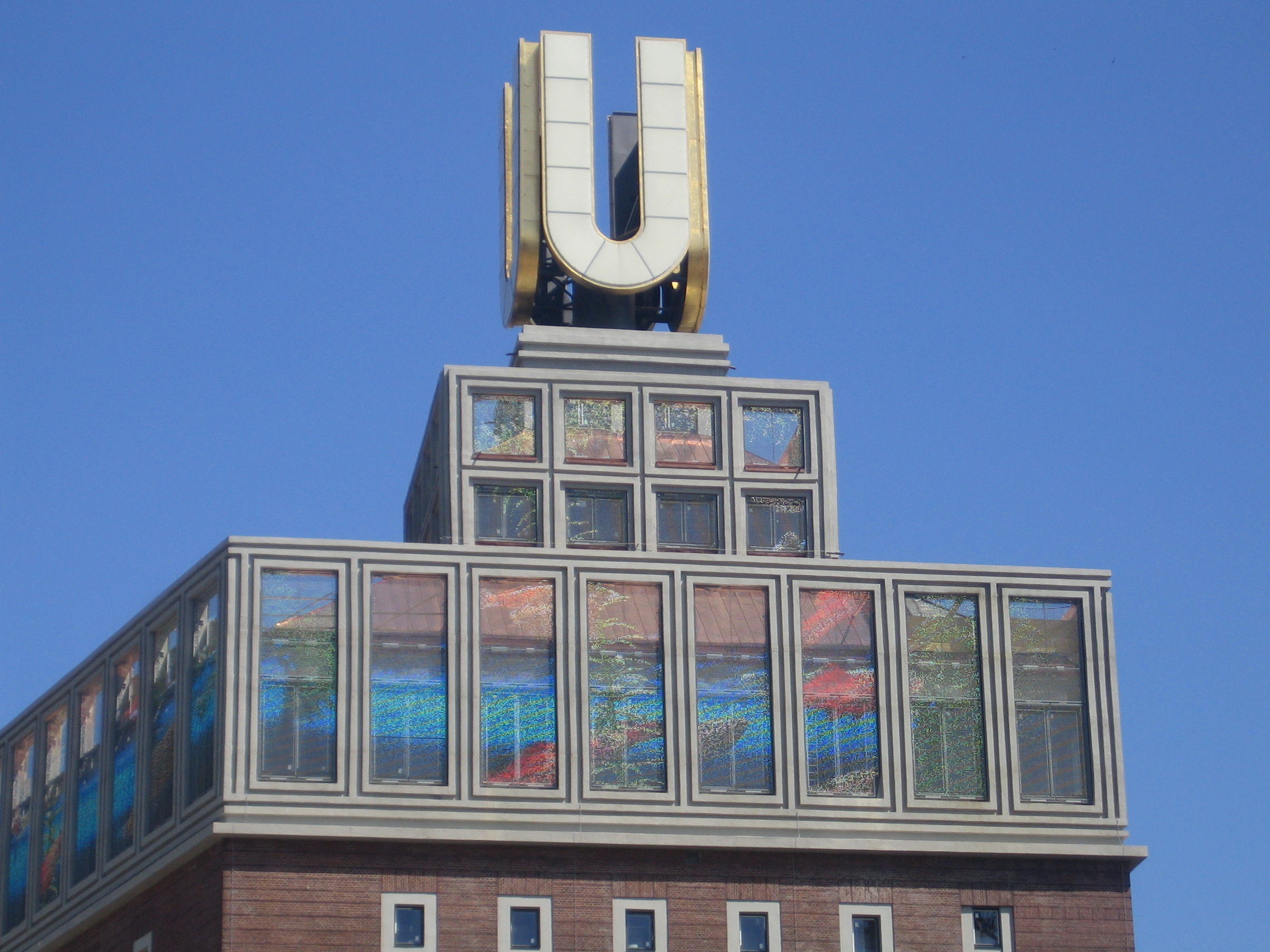
- Interactive map of the U-Tower area

General information
- Type: Event facility
- Location: Dortmund, North Rhine-Westphalia, Germany
- Coordinates: 51°30′54″N 7°27′13.03″E
- Construction started: 1926
- Completed: 1927
- Renovated: 2008, after closing in 2004, partly reopened in May 2010

Design and construction
- Architect: Emil Moog

Website
- www.dortmunder-u.de/en

The U-Tower or Dortmunder U is a former brewery building in the city of Dortmund, Germany. Since 2010 it has served as a centre for the arts and creativity, housing among other facilities the Museum Ostwall.

== History ==
It was the first high-rise built in Dortmund, between 1926 and 1927. The Union Brewery used this building for the fermentation and storage of their products.

In 1994 the brewery and all its surrounding buildings were closed and demolished; only the Dortmund U-Tower was spared due to having landmark status. In January 2008 the Dortmund U-Tower was decided to be redeveloped as a flagship project for the "Ruhr 2010 – Cultural Capital of Europe". Today it is considered one of Dortmund's central places, in which creative catering and event facilities are offered.

== Today ==
The Dortmunder U shows artworks from the 20th and 21st centuries, develops innovative concepts of cultural education in the digital age, initiates partnerships between art and science, and cooperates with different players in the context of creative industries. As a centre of international calibre in North Rhine-Westphalia it is a partner for regional as well as international projects and collaborates with other international institutions in the interdisciplinary field. The "U" embodies an innovative practice at the intersection of art, research, creativity, cultural education and economy.

It is a public place for research and study as well as for the experience and discourse about art, media and today's culture for all citizens and ages. The "U" is based on a cooperation of diverse users of the U-Tower building: the Museum Ostwall, the Hartware MedienKunstVerein, the Cultural Office of the City of Dortmund, the Dortmund University of Applied Sciences and Arts, the TU Dortmund University, the European Centre for Creative Economy (ecce) and the association U Cinema, operating the RWE Forum. Culinary offerings are provided on the U7 floor by the restaurant View.

The Dortmunder U opened within the framework of RUHR.2010 – European Capital of Culture.

== Photo gallery ==
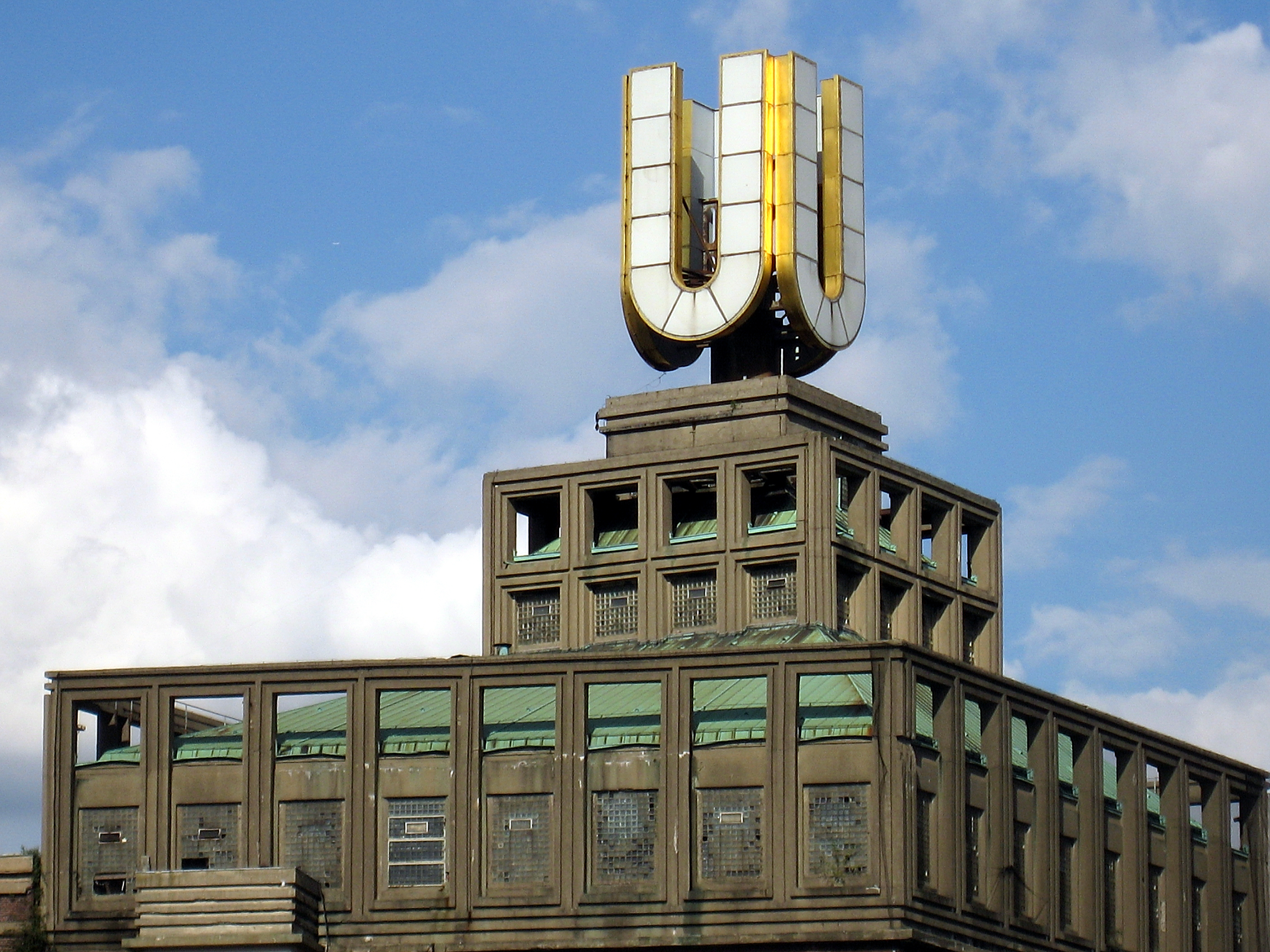
Dortmunder U-Tower with roof construction

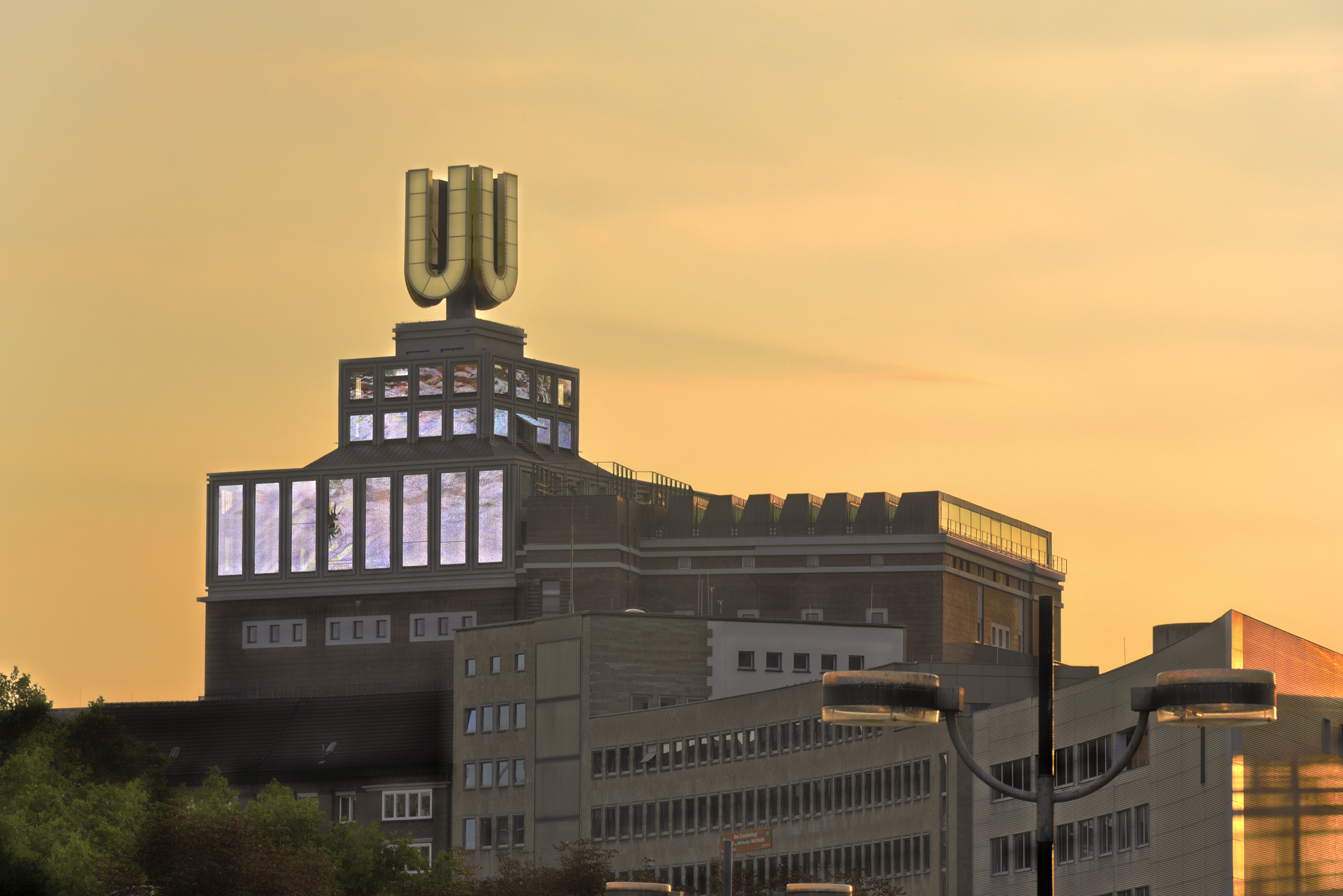
Dortmunder U-Tower at dawn

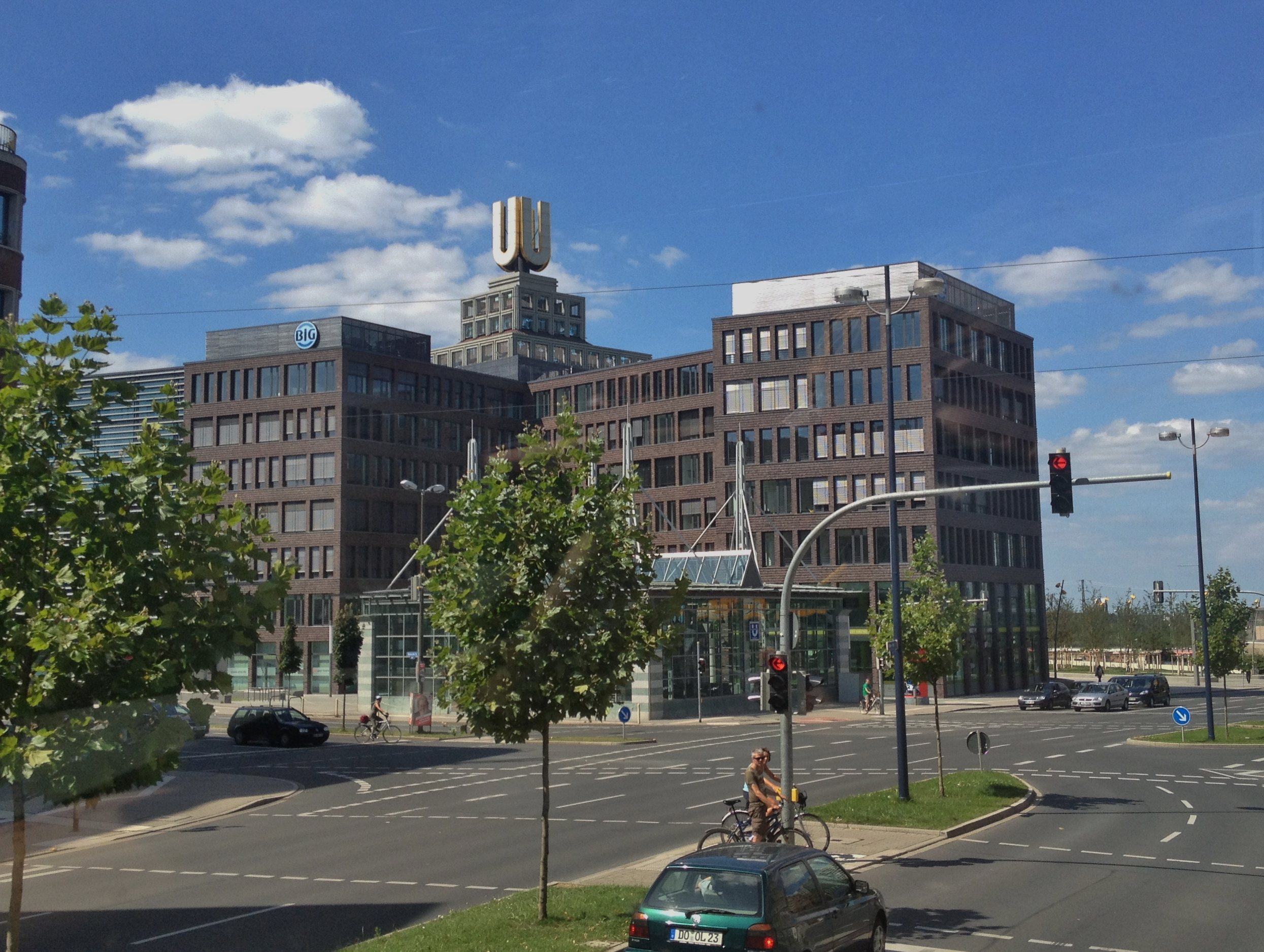
The formation of a new urban quarter
