= Sven Klang's Combo =

1976 film

- Directed by: Stellan Olsson
- Written by: Henric Holmberg; Ninne Olsson
- Produced by: Per Berglund
- Cinematography: Kent Person
- Release date: 22 September 1976
- Running time: 114 minutes
- Country: Sweden
- Language: Swedish
- Box office: 5.5 million Swedish krona

Sven Klang's Combo (Swedish: Sven Klangs kvintett) is a 1976 Swedish musical drama film directed by Stellan Olsson. The film was based on a 1974 play by Musikteatergruppen Oktober, and was shot in Ängelholm and Höganäs. At the 13th Guldbagge Awards it won the Special Achievement award. It was the biggest Swedish film of the year with a gross of 5.5 million Swedish krona. In 2012 it was voted one of the 25 best Swedish films of all time.

== Cast ==
- Henric Holmberg as Kennet Persson
- Eva Remaeus as Gunnel Andersson
- Jan Lindell as Rolf
- Anders Granström as Sven Klang
- Bo Gunnar Andersson as Fan
- Christer Boustedt as Lars-Göran Nilsson
- Ingvar Andersson as Man at Filling Station
- Reinhold Andersson as Gottfried Andersson
- Ole Blegel as Man
- Peter Blomberg as Waiter
- Birgit Eggers as Gunnel's Mother
