= Frihetens murar =

1978 film

- Directed by: Marianne Ahrne
- Written by: Renzo Casali; Marianne Ahrne
- Produced by: Jörn Donner
- Starring: Torgny Anderberg
- Cinematography: Hans Welin
- Release date: 26 December 1978
- Running time: 101 minutes
- Country: Sweden
- Language: Swedish

Frihetens murar (lit. 'The walls of freedom') is a 1978 Swedish drama film directed by Marianne Ahrne. It was entered into the 11th Moscow International Film Festival.

== Cast ==
- Torgny Anderberg as Head Waiter
- Britta Billsten as Spastic Woman
- Karin Biribakken as Singing girl on train
- Anders Börje as Singer at Hasselbacken
- Harry Carlson as Swedish-American
- Renzo Casali as Sergio
- Gösta Engström as Svenne
- Curt Ericson as Drunk
- Svante Grundberg as Waiter
- Olle Grönstedt as Train Conductor
- Vivian Gude as Elev
- Krister Henriksson as Svante
