= List of Canadian films of 1973 =

This is a list of Canadian films which were released in 1973:

Title	Director	Cast	Genre	Notes
Action: The October Crisis of 1970	Robin Spry		Documentary	
The Aviators of Hudson Strait	William Weintraub		Documentary	
Between Friends	Don Shebib	Michael Parks, Bonnie Bedelia, Chuck Shamata, Henry Beckman	Crime drama	
Blue Blood	Andrew Sinclair	Oliver Reed, Fiona Lewis, Meg Wynn Owen, Derek Jacobi	Drama	Canada-U.K. co-production
Cannibal Girls	Ivan Reitman	Eugene Levy, Andrea Martin, Ronald Ulrich	Horror, comedy	
Come on Children	Allan King		Documentary	
Coming Home	Bill Reid		Documentary	
The Conquest (La Conquête)	Jacques Gagné	Michelle Rossignol, Gilles Renaud	Romantic drama	
The Death of a Lumberjack (La Mort d'un bûcheron)	Gilles Carle	Carole Laure, Willie Lamothe, Daniel Pilon	Drama	
A Delicate Balance	Tony Richardson	Katharine Hepburn, Paul Scofield, Lee Remick, Kate Reid	Drama	UK-US-Canada coproduction
Enuff Is Enuff (J'ai mon voyage!)	Denis Héroux	Dominique Michel, Jean Lefebvre, Francis Blanche, Denise Proulx	Comedy	Canada-France co-production
The Family That Dwelt Apart	Yvon Mallette		NFB animated short	Academy Award nominee; Canadian Film Award – Animated Short
Goodbye Sousa	Tony Ianzelo		Documentary	
Grierson	Roger Blais		Documentary	
The Hard Part Begins	Paul Lynch	Donnelly Rhodes, Nancy Belle Fuller, Paul Bradley	Drama	
The Heavenly Bodies (Les Corps célestes)	Gilles Carle	Donald Pilon, Carole Laure, Micheline Lanctôt, Jacques Dufilho	Drama	
Hunger	Peter Foldès		NFB animated short	First computer-animated film.
Kamouraska	Claude Jutra	Geneviève Bujold, Richard Jordan, Philippe Léotard, Camille Bernard	Historical drama, romance based on the novel by Anne Hébert.	Canada-France co-production
Keep It in the Family	Larry Kent	John Gavin, Patricia Gage	Drama	
The Last Betrothal (Les Dernières fiançailles)	Jean Pierre Lefebvre	Marthe Nadeau, J.-Léo Gagnon	Drama	
Life Times Nine	Paul Shapiro, Melissa Franklin, Robi Blumenstein, Jordon Hale, Ricky Clark, Celia Merkur, Kimmie Jensen, Andy File, Marilyn Becker		Short	Produced by Pen Densham & John Watson; Academy Award nominee
The Neptune Factor	Daniel Petrie	Ben Gazzara, Yvette Mimieux, Walter Pidgeon	Underwater adventure	
The Netsilik Eskimo Today	Gilles Blais		Documentary	
O.K. ... Laliberté	Marcel Carrière	Jacques Godin, Luce Guilbeault, Jean Lapointe	Comedy-drama	
Oh, If Only My Monk Would Want (Ah! Si mon moine voulait...)	Claude Pierson	Jean-Marie Proslier, Gilles Latulippe, Marcel Sabourin, Alice Arno, Darry Cowl	Sex comedy	
Ordinary Tenderness (Tendresse ordinaire)	Jacques Leduc	Esther Auger, Jocelyn Bérubé	Drama	
Paperback Hero	Peter Pearson	Keir Dullea, Elizabeth Ashley, John Beck	Comedy drama	
Pigs Are Seldom Clean (On n'engraisse pas les cochons à l'eau claire)	Jean Pierre Lefebvre		Drama	
The Pyx	Harvey Hart	Karen Black, Christopher Plummer, Donald Pilon, Jean-Louis Roux	Thriller	
The Rainbow Boys	Gerald Potterton	Donald Pleasence, Kate Reid, Don Calfa	Comedy	
Reaction: A Portrait of a Society in Crisis	Robin Spry		Documentary	
Réjeanne Padovani	Denys Arcand	Roger Lebel, Céline Lomez	Crime drama	Canadian Film Award – Screenplay
Sing a Country Song	Jack McCallum	Tex Ritter, Red Steagall, Billy Joe Shaver, Blake Emmons, Duane Eddy, Sonny Curtis, Jerry Chesnut, Ben Peters	Documentary	
Slipstream	David Acomba	Luke Askew, Patti Oatman, Eli Rill	Drama, romance	
The Sloane Affair	Douglas Jackson	Michael Kane, John Bethune, Cec Linder, Ron Hartmann	Docudrama	
Taureau	Clément Perron	André Melançon, Michèle Magny, Monique Lepage, Marcel Sabourin	Drama	
There's Always a Way to Find a Way (Y'a toujours moyen de moyenner!)	Denis Héroux	Willie Lamothe, Jean-Guy Moreau, Yvan Ducharme, Dominique Michel	Comedy	
U-Turn	George Kaczender	David Selby, Maud Adams, Gay Rowan, William Osler	Drama	
Ultimatum	Jean Pierre Lefebvre	Jean-René Ouellet, Francine Morand, Lee J. Cobb, Franco Gasparri	Drama	
Unfinished Infonie (L'Infonie inachevée...)	Roger Frappier	L'Infonie	Documentary	
Weapons and Men (Des armes et les hommes)	André Melançon	André Cartier, Michel Forget, Marcel Sabourin	Docudrama	
You Are Warm, You Are Warm (Tu brûles... tu brûles...)	Jean-Guy Noël	Gabriel Arcand, Guy L'Écuyer, Pierre Curzi	Drama	

== See also ==
- 1973 in Canada
- 1973 in Canadian television
