= Straight to the Heart (1968 film) =

1968 Canadian drama film

- French: Jusqu'au cœur
- Directed by: Jean Pierre Lefebvre
- Written by: Jean Pierre Lefebvre
- Produced by: Clément Perron
- Starring: Robert Charlebois; Claudine Monfette
- Cinematography: Thomas Vámos
- Edited by: Marguerite Duparc
- Music by: Robert Charlebois
- Production company: National Film Board of Canada
- Release date: 1968
- Running time: 93 minutes
- Country: Canada
- Language: French

Straight to the Heart (French: Jusqu'au cœur) is a Canadian drama film, directed by Jean Pierre Lefebvre and released in 1968. The film stars Robert Charlebois as Garou, a committed pacifist who is detained by mysterious authorities who try to brainwash him into supporting and defending war, and Claudine Monfette as his girlfriend.

Following its Canadian theatrical premiere in 1968, the film was screened in the Director's Fortnight stream at the 1969 Cannes Film Festival.

== Critical analysis ==
Jay Scott of The Globe and Mail would later describe the film as "a confluence of Godard and the Antonioni of Blow Up", writing that "it is relentlessly experimental and gives the lie to the accusation that Lefebvre cannot pace his films rapidly". Peter Harcourt of the Canadian Film Institute wrote that "complex in its construction, Jusqu'au cœur seems simplistic in its conclusion. Though an interesting film, it can perhaps endure a cursory treatment. Its chief value may lie in the techniques discovered through the course of making this highly 'experimental' film — techniques that are more personally and more subtly employed in both La Chambre blanche and Ultimatum."

Film historian Thomas Waugh later analyzed the film as an early advance in LGBTQ representation in Canadian film. Although not addressing an LGBTQ-themed story, the film includes two brief scenes of same-sex couples (one each male and female) kissing, a practice which was then rare in cinema.
