= Le jour S... =

1984 film

- Directed by: Jean Pierre Lefebvre
- Written by: Jean Pierre Lefebvre; Barbara Easto
- Produced by: Yves Rivard
- Starring: Pierre Curzi
- Cinematography: Guy Dufaux
- Edited by: Barbara Easto
- Music by: Jean Pierre Lefebvre
- Release date: 19 October 1984
- Running time: 88 minutes
- Country: Canada
- Language: French

Le jour S... is a 1984 Canadian drama film directed by Jean Pierre Lefebvre. It was screened in the Un Certain Regard section at the 1984 Cannes Film Festival. Jean-Baptiste (Pierre Curzi), a restless Québécois in his late 30s, spends the day alone in Montreal while his current partner (Marie Tifo) is pursuing a career in Toronto. Every woman he encounters reminds him of her. He relives his past through actual encounters as well as his imaginative memory.

The film was a sequel to Lefebvre's 1968 film Patricia and Jean-Baptiste (Patricia et Jean-Baptiste).

The film was included in Jean Pierre Lefebvre: Vidéaste, a retrospective program of Lefebvre's films at the 2001 Toronto International Film Festival.

== Cast ==
- Pierre Curzi – Jean-Baptiste Beauregard
- Michel Daigle
- Violaine Estérez – The little girl
- Marcel Sabourin
- Marie Tifo – The women
