= The Old Country Where Rimbaud Died =

- French: Le Vieux pays où Rimbaud est mort
- Directed by: Jean Pierre Lefebvre
- Written by: Jean Pierre Lefebvre; Mireille Amiel
- Produced by: Marguerite Duparc; Hubert Niogret
- Starring: Marcel Sabourin; Anouk Ferjac; Myriam Boyer
- Cinematography: Guy Dufaux
- Edited by: Marguerite Duparc
- Music by: Claude Fondrède
- Distributed by: Cinak (Montreal); Filmobilic (Paris)
- Release dates: December 1977 (Paris); February 1978 (Montréal)
- Running time: 113 minutes
- Countries: Canada; France
- Language: French
- Budget: $352,000

The Old Country Where Rimbaud Died (French: Le Vieux pays où Rimbaud est mort) is a 1977 French-Canadian feature from Jean Pierre Lefebvre. The second film in his Abel Gagné trilogy, preceded by Don't Let It Kill You (Il ne faut pas mourir pour ça) in 1967 and followed by Now or Never (Aujourd'hui ou jamais) in 1998, the film follows Abel (Marcel Sabourin) on a journey to France to visit the land of his ancestors.

== Synopsis ==
Abel leaves Montreal for a visit to France, the country of his ancestors. In Paris he encounters several people, from a taxi-driver to a haute bourgeoisie family. He visits Jeanne (Myriam Boyer), a young widow who lives with her daughter (Viviane Lesser) and works in a garment factory. When Jeanne’s mother hangs herself they leave for Charleville, their hometown and Rimbaud's birthplace, where Abel meets Jeanne’s drunkard father (Roger Blin). Abel leaves for the Cote d’Azur where he meets Anne (Anouk Ferjac), a children’s court judge whose relationship with her husband (François Perrot) has deteriorated. They have an affair, during which Anne confesses her unhappiness. Abel returns to Quebec.

== Cast ==
- Marcel Sabourin: Abel
- Anouk Ferjac: Anne
- Myriam Boyer: Jeanne
- Roger Blin: Jeanne's father
- François Perrot: Anne's husband

== Production ==
A sequel, La Mort du père prodigue, was meant to be filmed in 1978, but was never made. Lefebvre instead made To Be Sixteen.

== Importance ==
It was later screened at the 1984 Festival of Festivals as part of Front & Centre, a special retrospective program of artistically and culturally significant films from throughout the history of Canadian cinema.

The 2001 Toronto International Film Festival presented a Lefebvre retrospective in conjunction with the publication of Jean Pierre Lefebvre, Vidéaste by Peter Harcourt. In the program notes for the film Harcourt wrote: "Conceived as a continuation of Lefebvre's Il ne faut mourir pour ça, Le Vieux pays où Rimbaud est mort tells the story of Abel, who travels to France on a personal quest. Enraptured by the cultural aesthetics of Rimbaud and Cézanne, Abel longs to discover the link, if any, between the 'glories' of France and his uncertain identity as a Québécois. On his journey to the locations where Arthur Rimbaud was born, lived and died, Abel encounters a variety of French people who represent in their different ways the various regions of their nation. These encounters put into context for Abel the place, or placelessness of his own identity".

Le Vieux pays où Rimbaud est mort remains a poetic commentary on how Canadians are perhaps still fighting the old colonial battles with European powers.

== Reception ==
This official Canada-France co-production, which was shown in competition at the 1977 Cannes Film Festival, is certainly one of the director’s accessible films, but it did less well in commercial distribution than it deserved. Made as the Parti Québécois came to power, it was unfashionably critical of Quebec's colonial relationship to France.

"Film skirts banality in its mixture of satirical and mainly black and white looks at France by this fairly simple and direct Quebecoise of French origin. But there is a certain charm and perceptiveness, in broad strokes, about the mixture of French generosity and lack of it". Variety

"By turns gay and sad, and for the most part languorously beautiful, its beauty remains as separate from its Quebecois hero as the Cézanne paintings on the museum walls. The France of his ancestors, the France he has come to find, exists only in the museums and in his imagination. And it is Lefebvre's genius that he has invented a visual language for describing this shadowy terrain between the public gallery and corridors of the mind". Take One

== Works cited ==
- Pallister, Janis (1995). The Cinema of Quebec: Masters in Their Own House. Associated University Presses. ISBN 0838635628.
