= My Friend Pierrette =

1969 Canadian film

- French: Mon amie Pierrette
- Directed by: Jean Pierre Lefebvre
- Written by: Jean-Pierre Lefebvre
- Produced by: Clément Perron
- Starring: Francine Mathieu; Yves Marchand; Raôul Duguay
- Cinematography: Jacques Leduc
- Edited by: Marguerite Duparc
- Production company: National Film Board of Canada
- Distributed by: Faroun Films
- Release date: July 20, 1969
- Running time: 69 minutes
- Country: Canada
- Language: French

My Friend Pierrette (French: Mon amie Pierrette) is a Canadian comedy-drama film, directed by Jean Pierre Lefebvre and released in 1969. The film stars Yves Marchand and Francine Mathieu as Yves and Pierrette, a young couple who are spending their first vacation together at a family cottage when they meet Raoul (Raôul Duguay), an artist who comes between them.

The film opened theatrically in Quebec in July 1969, and was later screened in the Directors Fortnight program at the 1970 Cannes Film Festival.

The film was included in Jean Pierre Lefebvre: Vidéaste, a retrospective program of Lefebvre's films at the 2001 Toronto International Film Festival.
