= Patricia and Jean-Baptiste =

1968 Canadian film

- French: Patricia et Jean-Baptiste
- Directed by: Jean Pierre Lefebvre
- Written by: Jean-Pierre Lefebvre
- Produced by: Marguerite Duparc
- Starring: Jean-Pierre Lefebvre; Patricia Kaden-Lacroix
- Cinematography: Michel Régnier
- Edited by: Marguerite Duparc
- Music by: Raôul Duguay; Andrée Paul; Les Tiqueclaques
- Production company: Films JP Lefebvre
- Release date: September 17, 1968
- Running time: 83 minutes
- Country: Canada
- Language: French

Patricia and Jean-Baptiste (French: Patricia et Jean-Baptiste) is a Canadian comedy-drama film, directed by Jean Pierre Lefebvre and released in 1968. The film stars Lefebvre as Jean-Baptiste, a factory worker who is directed by his employer to take Patricia (Patricia Kaden-Lacroix), a woman who has recently emigrated from France to take a job as secretary at the factory, on a tour of Montreal, during which he both develops a romantic interest in Patricia and transforms his own dismissive view of the city.

The film was partially inspired by, but not a literal retelling of, Lefebvre's own relationship with his wife, film producer and French immigrant Marguerite Duparc.

Lefebvre's 1984 film Le jour S... revisited the story of Jean-Baptiste, following his divorce and his initiation of a relationship with a new woman. Unlike Patricia and Jean-Baptiste, however, Lefebvre did not play the role of Jean-Baptiste himself in the sequel, instead casting actor Pierre Curzi.

In 1990, the film was chosen as one of the 1960s representatives in Montreal à travers trois décennies de cinéma québécois, a retrospective program of films depicting Montreal, alongside the films À tout prendre, The Cat in the Bag (Le chat dans le sac), The Merry World of Leopold Z (La vie heureuse de Léopold Z) and Between Salt and Sweet Water (Entre la mer et l'eau douce).
