= The Revolutionary (1965 film) =

1965 Canadian film

- French: Le Révolutionnaire
- Directed by: Jean Pierre Lefebvre
- Written by: Jean Pierre Lefebvre
- Produced by: Jean Pierre Lefebvre
- Starring: Louis St-Pierre; Louise Rasselet; Alain Chartrand; Robert Daudelin
- Cinematography: Michel Régnier
- Edited by: Marguerite Duparc; Francine Saia
- Music by: Lionel Renaud
- Distributed by: Faroun Films
- Release date: November 19, 1965
- Running time: 73 minutes
- Country: Canada
- Language: French

The Revolutionary (French: Le Révolutionnaire) is a Canadian satirical film, directed by Jean Pierre Lefebvre and released in 1965. The film stars Louis St-Pierre as a radical university student in Quebec who wants to launch a revolution to overthrow the Canadian government, only to have his efforts to recruit and train fellow revolutionaries in a rural compound derailed when he meets and falls for a young woman (Louise Rasselet) staying in another cabin nearby.

The film's cast also included Alain Chartrand, Robert Daudelin, Michel Gauthier, René Goulet, Pierre Hébert, Camil Houle, Richard Lacroix, André Leduc, Réal Leduc, Jacques Monette, Michel Patenaude, Jean-Pierre Payette, Christian Rasselet, Yves Robillard, Jean-Pierre Roy, Jean-Guy Simard, Jacques Soublière and André Théberge.

The film, Lefebvre's debut, was shot in Bedford, Quebec between December 27, 1964 and January 3, 1965, on a very limited budget and a tight schedule, with an aesthetic that favoured long shots, and established Lefebvre's longstanding practice of making films based around aesthetic or thematic limitations. When he was named a recipient of the Governor General's Performing Arts Award in 2013, Lefebvre credited the making of the film as having taught him many of the lessons that would inform his filmmaking style throughout his career; he had approached the project with preconceived ideas about what the film would be, but found that the shooting process changed it significantly. According to Lefebvre, "what I learned was that I could not reinvent reality but reality was reinventing me. To me, that was the base of everything."

The film was rejected by the Montreal International Film Festival in 1965, purportedly for technical reasons although Lefebvre alleged that it had been rejected on political grounds. It premiered commercially in Montreal in November 1965, and was screened at the 18th Berlin Film Festival in 1968 as part of Young Canadian Film, a lineup of films by emerging Canadian filmmakers. The film also saw significant distribution for student audiences on college and university campuses.
