= Don't Let It Kill You =

- French: Il ne faut pas mourir pour ça
- Directed by: Jean Pierre Lefebvre
- Written by: Jean Pierre Lefebvre; Marcel Sabourin
- Produced by: Jean Pierre Lefebvre
- Starring: Marcel Sabourin; Monique Champagne; Suzanne Grossman; Claudine Monfette; Fleur-Ange Laplante
- Cinematography: Jacques Leduc
- Edited by: Marguerite Duparc
- Music by: Andrée Paul
- Distributed by: Les Films J.P. Lefebvre
- Release dates: 1967 (Montreal, Festival du Cinéma Canadien, Festival International du Film)
- Running time: 75 minutes
- Country: Canada
- Language: French
- Budget: $35,000

Don't Let It Kill You (French: Il ne faut pas mourir pour ça) is a 1967 French-Canadian feature from Jean Pierre Lefebvre. It is the first film in his "Abel Trilogy", followed by The Old Country Where Rimbaud Died (Le Vieux pays où Rimbaud est mort) in 1977 and Now or Never (Aujourd'hui ou jamais) in 1998.

== Synopsis ==
The story concerns a day in the life of Abel Gagné (Marcel Sabourin). Self-absorbed to the point of existential withdrawal, the gentle and mildly eccentric Abel confers upon all events a kind of mystical grandeur and perplexity. The film opens with a slogan on a blackboard: "I want to change the course of things – but it is things which change me".

One day he makes breakfast, behaving in a somewhat odd manner as he prepares to go out. He visits his dying mother (Monique Champagne) in hospital and learns that his father (who had left them and is living in Brazil) has sent him $10,000. Later, by chance, he meets Mary (Suzanne Grossman), an old girlfriend he has not seen for five years. She is about to be married in Paris. He returns home to wait for Madeleine (Claudine Monfette), his current girlfriend, and the hospital calls to tell him his mother has died.

== Cast ==
- André Pagé
- Marcel Sabourin
- Denise Morelle
- Monique Champagne
- Claudine Monfette
- Suzanne Grossmann
- Katia Bellangé
- Gabbi Sylvain
- Lusarif Atamoglu

== Distribution ==
The film was screened at the 18th Berlin Film Festival in 1968 as part of Young Canadian Film, a lineup of films by emerging Canadian filmmakers.

It was later screened at the 1984 Festival of Festivals as part of Front & Centre, a special retrospective program of artistically and culturally significant films from throughout the history of Canadian cinema.
