= Denise Morelle =

Quebec actress

Denise Morelle (3 December 1926 in Montreal – 17 July 1984 in Montreal) was a Quebec actress whose 1984 murder was a significant media event in Quebec.

== Life and career ==
Morelle was born in Montreal on 3 December 1926, into a working-class family with seven children. She first appeared on television in 1955 on the television series Beau temps, mauvais temps. Among her most famous roles from her 30-year career was that of Dame Plume from the show La Ribouldingue.

== Death ==
On 17 July 1984, Morelle visited a ground-floor apartment on Sanguinet Street in Montreal that she was considering renting. The landlord was not there, but had told her earlier that she could go in anytime she wished because the apartment was not locked. That evening she failed to show up for a play in which she was performing, and police found her body in the apartment the next day: she had been strangled, beaten and raped. Her funeral was attended by over 1,000 friends, supporters, and colleagues, including Michel Tremblay and Jean Duceppe. A small park in the Le Plateau district of Montreal has since been named after her.

== Investigation ==
No apparent motive existed for her murder, and it was initially the subject of hysterical speculation in the press and amongst the public. It remained entirely unsolved until 8 August 2007, when investigators from the major crimes division of the Montreal police arrested 49-year-old Gaetan Bissonnette, who had been identified from a DNA sample he had provided for an unrelated reason. The TV network TVA claimed that a program it had aired on the case had led to the discovery. Bissonnette appeared before court on 9 August, accused of first-degree murder, but pleaded guilty to a reduced second-degree murder charge. On 30 November 2007, he was sentenced to life in prison with no chance of parole for 20 years.

== Filmography ==
- 1955 : Beau temps, mauvais temps (television series)
- 1963 : Ti-Jean caribou (TV series)
- 1967 : Don't Let It Kill You (Il ne faut pas mourir pour ça)
- 1968 : La Ribouldingue (TV series) : Dame Plume
- 1969 : Bidule de Tarmacadam (TV series) : Mame Bouline
- 1971 : Those Damned Savages (Les Maudits sauvages) : Marie
- 1972 : In the Name of the Son (Et du fils)
- 1972: Françoise Durocher, Waitress
- 1974 : Once Upon a Time in the East (Il était une fois dans l'est) : Belle Sœur
- 1975 : A Woman Inflamed (Tout feu, tout femme)
- 1975 : The Yellow Island (L'Île jaune)
- 1975 : Confidences of the Night (L'Amour blessé)
- 1977 : The Late Blossom (Le Soleil se lève en retard) : Colette
- 1980 : Frédéric (TV series) : Develine Gladu
