= My Eye =

1971 film

- French: Mon œil
- Directed by: Jean Pierre Lefebvre
- Written by: Jean Pierre Lefebvre
- Produced by: Jean Pierre Lefebvre
- Starring: Raôul Duguay
- Cinematography: Michel St-Jean; Michel Régnier; Jacques Leduc
- Edited by: Marguerite Duparc
- Production company: Les films JP Lefebvre
- Distributed by: Faroun Films
- Release date: January 29, 1971
- Running time: 87 minutes
- Country: Canada
- Language: French

My Eye (French: Mon œil) is a Canadian satirical film, written and directed by Jean Pierre Lefebvre and released in 1971. Satirizing the dominance of television, the film stars Raôul Duguay as a man who is watching television and imagining himself as a participant in eight different programs over the course of the evening.

The cast also includes Katia Bellangé, Janou Furtado, Andrée Paul, Huguette Roy, Céline Bernier, Pauline Fortier, André Leduc, Denys Arcand, Yvon Malette, Pierre Hébert, Don Arioli, Pierre Bernier, Gérard Paquin, Camil Houle, M. Messier, Ronald Perrault and Jacqueline Leduc.

Lefebvre shot the film in 1966, but for various production reasons it was not released until 1971. The film received limited commercial release in January 1971, but has not received widespread distribution since.
