= Marguerite Duparc =

Canadian film producer (1933–1982)

- Born: March 13, 1933; France
- Died: February 13, 1982 (aged 48); Montreal, Quebec, Canada
- Occupations: Film producer, film editor
- Years active: 1965–1982
- Spouse: Jean Pierre Lefebvre (1960s-1982, her death)

Marguerite Duparc (March 13, 1933 – February 13, 1982) was a Canadian film producer and editor, best known for her collaborations with her husband Jean Pierre Lefebvre.

== Biography ==
Born in France, Duparc emigrated to Canada in 1955, and worked in film distribution until marrying Lefebvre in the early 1960s. She was the editor of virtually all of Lefebvre's films from The Revolutionary (Le révolutionnaire) in 1965 through to Wild Flowers (Les fleurs sauvages) in 1982; through her studio Cinak, she was also producer of many but not all of the same films, as well as on films by Denys Arcand, Jean Chabot, André Blanchard, Michel Audy and Raôul Duguay. Her relationship with Lefebvre partially inspired his 1968 film Patricia and Jean-Baptiste (Patricia et Jean-Baptiste).

She was a Canadian Film Award nominee at the 25th Canadian Film Awards in 1973, as producer of Arcand's Réjeanne Padovani.

She had begun work on Histoires pour Blaise, an animated children's film which would have been her directorial debut, in the early 1980s, but the film was not completed by the time of her death of cancer in early 1982. The film was completed by Yves Rivard, and released in 1983. Her illness and death formed the basis for Lefebvre's 1983 documentary film To the Rhythm of My Heart (Au rythme de mon cœur).

== Filmography ==
=== Editor ===
- The Revolutionary (Le révolutionnaire) – 1965
- Don't Let It Kill You (Il ne faut pas mourir pour ça) – 1967
- Patricia and Jean-Baptiste (Patricia et Jean-Baptiste) – 1968
- My Friend Pierrette (Mon amie Pierrette) – 1969
- Straight to the Heart (Jusqu'au coeur) – 1969
- The House of Light (La chambre blanche) – 1969
- Q-Bec My Love (Un succès commercial, ou Q-bec My Love) – 1970
- Those Damned Savages (Les maudits sauvages) – 1971
- My Eye (Mon œil) – 1971
- My Childhood in Montreal (Mon enfance à Montréal) - 1971
- Dirty Money (La maudite galette) - 1972
- O or the Invisible Infant (Ô ou l'invisible enfant) - 1972
- Body and Soul (Corps et âme) - 1972
- Ultimatum – 1973
- Réjeanne Padovani - 1973
- The Last Betrothal (Les dernières fiançailles) – 1973
- Pigs Are Seldom Clean (On n'engraisse pas les cochons à l'eau claire) – 1973
- Alfred Pellan, peintre - 1974
- Confidences of the Night (L'amour blessé) – 1975
- The Yellow Island (L'Île jaune) - 1975
- The Man from the Movies (Le gars des vues) – 1976
- The Old Country Where Rimbaud Died (Le vieux pays où Rimbaud est mort) – 1977
- To Be Sixteen (Avoir 16 ans) – 1979
- Wild Flowers (Les fleurs sauvages) – 1982

=== Producer ===
- Don't Let It Kill You (Il ne faut pas mourir pour ça) – 1967
- Q-Bec My Love (Un succès commercial, ou Q-bec My Love) – 1970
- Dirty Money (La maudite galette) - 1972
- Body and Soul (Corps et âme) - 1972
- Réjeanne Padovani - 1973
- The Last Betrothal (Les dernières fiançailles) – 1973
- Pigs Are Seldom Clean (On n'engraisse pas les cochons à l'eau claire) – 1973
- Ultimatum – 1973
- Confidences of the Night (L'amour blessé) – 1975
- The Yellow Island (L'Île jaune) - 1975
- The Man from the Movies (Le gars des vues) – 1976
- The Old Country Where Rimbaud Died (Le vieux pays où Rimbaud est mort) – 1977
- To Be Sixteen (Avoir 16 ans) – 1979
- Blue Winter (L'Hiver bleu) - 1979
- Wild Flowers (Les fleurs sauvages) – 1982
