= Jean-Pierre Ronfard =

Jean-Pierre Ronfard (January 14, 1929 - September 23, 2003) was a French-born Canadian actor, playwright and theatre director from Quebec, most noted as the first director of the French-language program at the National Theatre School of Canada.

== Life and career ==
Born in Thivencelle, Nord, France, he was educated at the University of Lille. He moved to Montreal in 1960 to take the job with the National Theatre School. After the end of his job with the National Theatre School in 1964 he returned to France, but moved back to Montreal in 1970 to become artistic director of the Théâtre du Nouveau Monde, and would remain based in Montreal for the remainder of his life and career.

He also later founded the Nouveau Théâtre expérimental theatre company with Robert Gravel and Pol Pelletier.

As a playwright, his plays included Quichotte (1969), La Vie et mort du roi boiteux (1981), Le Mandragore (1982), Le Titanic (1985), Les objets parlent (1986), Mao Tsé Toung ou Soirée de musique au consulat (1987), and Autour de Phédre (1988). Theatre critic Marianne Ackerman once described Ronfard's work as "Imagine Monty Python tackling the complete works of William Shakespeare with an intimate knowledge of the mafiosi and Quebec cultures to lean on."

He acted primarily on stage, but also had occasional film and television roles, and directed productions of plays by writers such as Aeschylus, Alfred Jarry, Eugène Ionesco, Claude Gauvreau, Réjean Ducharme, Jean Barbeau, and Robert Claing.

He was married to writer Marie Cardinal. They had three children, including theatre director Alice Ronfard.

He died in 2003 during the stage run of his final play, Oedipe à Colone.

== Awards ==
He was a four-time nominee for the Governor General's Award for French-language drama, receiving nods at the 1981 Governor General's Awards for Vie et mort du Roi Boiteux, the 1986 Governor General's Awards for Le Titanic, the 1994 Governor General's Awards for Cinq études, and the 2003 Governor General's Awards for Écriture pour le théâtre, tome III.

In 1997, he was a recipient of the Governor General's Performing Arts Award for his career in theatre. In 1999, he was the recipient of the Prix Denise-Pelletier for outstanding contributions to the performing arts in Quebec.

In 2000 he received the National Theatre School's Gascon-Thomas Award.

== Filmography ==
- Comfort and Indifference (Le confort et l'indifférence) - 1982
- Odyssey of the Pacific (L'Empéreur du Pérou) - 1982
- Laura Laur - 1989
- L'Empire des lumières - 1991
- La Fenêtre - 1992
- Remue-ménage - 1996
- These Children by the Way (Ces enfants d'ailleurs) - 1997
- Un miroir sur la scène - Première partie: L'affirmation - 1997
- Now or Never (Aujourd'hui ou jamais) - 1998
- Encore dimanche - 2002
- Chaos and Desire (La Turbulence des fluides) - 2002
