= The Flower Between the Teeth =

Canadian drama television film

- French: La fleur aux dents
- Genre: Drama
- Based on: La fleur aux dents by Gilles Archambault
- Written by: Thomas Vámos; Pierre Turgeon
- Directed by: Thomas Vámos
- Starring: Claude Jutra; Anne Dandurand; Lise Lasalle
- Theme music composer: Pierre F. Brault
- Country of origin: Canada
- Original language: French

Production
- Producer: Marc Beaudet
- Cinematography: Jean-Pierre Lachapelle; Martin Leclerc; Armand Gagnon
- Editors: Werner Nold; France Dubé
- Running time: 86 minutes
- Production company: National Film Board of Canada

Original release
- Network: SRC
- Release: January 14, 1976

The Flower Between the Teeth (French: La fleur aux dents) is a Canadian drama television film, directed by Thomas Vámos and released in 1976. Adapted from the novel La fleur aux dents by Gilles Archambault, the film stars Claude Jutra as Georges Lamontagne, a radio broadcaster in his 40s who is increasingly out of touch with the changing social values of the 1970s: his daughter Marie-France (Anne Dandurand) is pregnant but has announced that she will not be marrying the baby's father, his wife Louise (Lise Lasalle) is no longer satisfied with life as a housewife and wants to be more independent, and the radio station where he works is moving away from its talk radio past, in which Georges thrived as a producer of philosophical documentaries on Quebec nationalism, toward a youth-oriented pop music format.

The cast also includes Guy L'Écuyer, Gaétan Labrèche, Ghislaine Paradis, Michelle Rossignol, Serge Thériault, Jacques Famery, Jacques L'Heureux, Jean Mathieu, Guy Nadon, Jean-Pierre Saulnier, Manuel Aranguiz, Pierre Maheu, Danielle Naud and Jean-Pierre Piché in supporting roles.

The film was broadcast by Télévision de Radio-Canada in January 1976.
