= The Fabulous Voyage of the Angel =

- French: Le fabuleux voyage de l'ange
- Directed by: Jean Pierre Lefebvre
- Written by: Jean Pierre Lefebvre; Normand Desjardins
- Produced by: François Dupuis
- Starring: Daniel Lavoie; Geneviève Grandbois; Marcel Sabourin
- Cinematography: Robert Vanherweghem
- Edited by: Barbara Easto
- Music by: Daniel Lavoie
- Production company: ACPAV
- Release date: 1991
- Running time: 102 minutes
- Country: Canada
- Language: French

The Fabulous Voyage of the Angel (French: Le fabuleux voyage de l'ange) is a Canadian fantasy comedy film, directed by Jean Pierre Lefebvre and released in 1991. The film stars Daniel Lavoie as Francis, a taxi driver and comic book artist who begins drawing a fantastical comic series about an intergalactic taxi driver in outer space, only to find that the stories he imagines for his comic strip start to materialize in real life. The film also stars Geneviève Grandbois as Francis's daughter Ève, and Marcel Sabourin as his brother Rival.

Lavoie, a prominent singer-songwriter prior to his acting role in the film, also composed the music. Lavoie and Lefebvre received a Genie Award nomination for Best Original Song at the 12th Genie Awards, for "Quand tu partiras".
