= Now or Never (1998 film) =

1998 film

- French: Aujourd'hui ou jamais
- Directed by: Jean Pierre Lefebvre
- Written by: Jean Pierre Lefebvre; Marcel Sabourin
- Produced by: Bernard Lalonde
- Starring: Marcel Sabourin; Claude Blanchard; Julie Ménard; Jean-Pierre Ronfard; Micheline Lanctôt
- Cinematography: Robert Vanherweghem
- Edited by: Barbara Easto; Jean Pierre Lefebvre
- Music by: Daniel Lavoie
- Production company: Les Productions Vent d'Est
- Release date: September 16, 1998 (TIFF)
- Running time: 106 minutes
- Country: Canada
- Language: French

Now or Never (French: Aujourd'hui ou jamais) is a Canadian drama film, directed by Jean Pierre Lefebvre and released in 1998. The third and final film in a trilogy with Don't Let It Kill You (Il ne faut pas mourir pour ça) in 1967 and The Old Country Where Rimbaud Died (Le Vieux pays où Rimbaud est mort) in 1977, the film updates the story of Abel Gagné (Marcel Sabourin) in his middle age.

In the film, Abel Gagné has been working for many years as the owner of a small aviation company, but has not personally flown a plane since the death of his friend in a plane crash 15 years earlier. On the day he decides to finally fly again, however, various complications crop up to interfere with his plan, including the return of his estranged father Napoléon (Claude Blanchard) whom he has not seen in 50 years. Lefebvre described the trilogy's themes as being about family relationships, with Don't Let It Kill You as addressing the mother, The Old Country Where Rimbaud Died as addressing ancestors, and Now or Never addressing the father. The film's cast also includes Julie Ménard as Monique, the daughter of Abel's dead friend; Jean-Pierre Ronfard as Abel's business partner; and Micheline Lanctôt as Arlette.

The film premiered in the Perspective Canada program at the 1998 Toronto International Film Festival.

The film received a Genie Award nomination for Best Original Song (Daniel Lavoie and Claude Gauthier for "Est-ce si loin Québec") at the 19th Genie Awards in 1999. The film received three nominations at the 1st Jutra Awards the same year, for Best Actor (Sabourin), Best Supporting Actor (Blanchard) and Best Supporting Actress (Lanctôt).

All three films in the trilogy were screened at the 2016 Festival du nouveau cinéma as a tribute program to Lefebvre.

== Cast ==
- Seann Gallagher
- Micheline Lanctôt as Arlette
- Sarah Mennell
- Julie Ménard as Mylene / Monique
- Jean-Pierre Ronfard as Antoine
- Marcel Sabourin as Abel Gagné
