= Wild Flowers (1982 film) =

1982 film

- French: Les fleurs sauvages
- Directed by: Jean Pierre Lefebvre
- Written by: Jean Pierre Lefebvre
- Produced by: Marguerite Duparc
- Starring: Marthe Nadeau
- Cinematography: Guy Dufaux
- Release date: 26 June 1982
- Running time: 152 minutes
- Country: Canada
- Language: French

Wild Flowers (French: Les Fleurs sauvages) is a 1982 Canadian drama film written and directed by Jean Pierre Lefebvre. The film won the FIPRESCI Prize at the 1982 Cannes Film Festival and was selected as the Canadian entry for the Best Foreign Language Film at the 55th Academy Awards, but was not accepted as a nominee.

== Cast ==
- Marthe Nadeau
- Michèle Magny
- Pierre Curzi
- Claudia Aubin
- Eric Beauséjour
- Georges Bélisle
- Sarah Mills
- Michel Viala
- Monique Thouin
- Raoul Duguay

== See also ==
- List of submissions to the 55th Academy Awards for Best Foreign Language Film
- List of Canadian submissions for the Academy Award for Best Foreign Language Film
