= The Revolving Doors =

- French: Les Portes tournantes
- Directed by: Francis Mankiewicz
- Written by: Francis Mankiewicz; Jacques Savoie
- Based on: Les Portes tournantes by Jacques Savoie
- Produced by: René Malo; Francyne Morin
- Starring: Monique Spaziani; Gabriel Arcand; Miou-Miou
- Cinematography: Thomas Vámos
- Edited by: André Corriveau
- Music by: François Dompierre
- Production company: ACPAV
- Distributed by: Seville Pictures
- Release date: 13 July 1988
- Running time: 101 minutes
- Countries: Canada; France
- Language: French

The Revolving Doors (French: Les Portes tournantes) is a 1988 Canadian-French French-language drama film directed by Francis Mankiewicz. The film was selected as the Canadian entry for the Best Foreign Language Film at the 61st Academy Awards, but was not accepted as a nominee.

== Synopsis ==
Céleste (Monique Spaziani), a jazz pianist, has reached the twilight of her years. Alone in her New York apartment, she looks back on her life and decides to record it all in a diary that she sends to her estranged son, Blaudelle (Gabriel Arcand). The arrival of the diary disrupts Blaudelle's life, although his son, Antoine (François Méthé), is intrigued, and it is through his eyes that Céleste's life is revealed.

== Cast ==
- Monique Spaziani - Céleste
- Gabriel Arcand - Madrigal Blaudelle
- Miou-Miou - Lauda
- François Méthé - Antoine
- Jacques Penot - Pierre Blaudelle
- Françoise Faucher - Simone Blaudelle
- Jean-Louis Roux - Monsieur Blaudelle
- Rémy Girard - Monsieur Litwin
- Rita Lafontaine - Madame Beaumont
- Hubert Loiselle - Monsieur Beaumont
- Papa John Creach - John Devil
- Charles Reiner - Gunther
- Marcel Sabourin - Homme du Train
- Charlotte Laurier - Bonne
- Martin Faucher - Enfant Beaumont

== Reception ==
=== Box office ===
The film was seen by less than 10,000 people in France.

=== Awards and nominations ===
- 1989
  - Genie Award for Best Achievement in Costume Design - François Barbeau - Won
  - Genie Award for Best Performance by an Actor in a Supporting Role - Rémy Girard - Won
  - Genie Award for Best Achievement in Art Direction/Production Design - Anne Pritchard - Nominated
  - Genie Award for Best Achievement in Cinematography - Thomas Vámos - Nominated
  - Genie Award for Best Achievement in Direction - Francis Mankiewicz - Nominated
  - Genie Award for Best Motion Picture - Francyne Morin, René Malo - Nominated
  - Genie Award for Best Music Score - François Dompierre - Nominated
  - Genie Award for Best Performance by an Actress in a Leading Role - Monique Spaziani - Nominated
  - Genie Award for Best Performance by an Actress in a Supporting Role - Miou-Miou - Nominated
  - Genie Award for Best Adapted Screenplay - Jacques Savoie, Francis Mankiewicz - Nominated
- 1988
  - Cannes Film Festival Prize of the Ecumenical Jury - Special Mention - Francis Mankiewicz - Won. Screened in the Un Certain Regard section.

== See also ==
- List of submissions to the 61st Academy Awards for Best Foreign Language Film
- List of Canadian submissions for the Academy Award for Best Foreign Language Film

== Works cited ==
- Marshall, Bill (2001). Quebec National Cinema. McGill–Queen's University Press. ISBN 0-7735-2103-8.
