= Blue Winter (film) =

- French: L'hiver bleu
- Directed by: André Blanchard
- Written by: André Blanchard; Jeanne-Mance Delisle
- Produced by: Marguerite Duparc
- Starring: Christiane Lévesque; Nicole Scant
- Cinematography: Alain Dupras
- Edited by: Ginette Leduc; Francis Van den Heuvel
- Music by: Abbitibbi
- Production company: Cinak
- Distributed by: Les Films du Crépuscule
- Release date: 1979
- Running time: 82 minutes
- Country: Canada
- Language: French

Blue Winter (French: L'hiver bleu) is a Canadian docufiction film, directed by André Blanchard and released in 1979. Using a cast of non-professional actors, the film centres on Christiane (Christiane Lévesque) and Nicole (Nicole Scant), two young adult sisters trying to establish themselves in the economically struggling city of Rouyn-Noranda, Quebec.

The film won the Prix de la critique québécoise in 1979.

It was later screened at the 1984 Festival of Festivals, as part of Front & Centre, a special retrospective program of artistically and culturally significant films from throughout the history of Canadian cinema.

== Plot ==
Two young women leave their small hometown in Abitibi-Témiscamingue. The younger one finds a job in a restaurant in Rouyn, hoping to quickly earn enough to travel to South America. The older one increasingly neglects the studies she had planned to pursue at Cégep and discovers the realities of working-class life and socialist ideals. One will leave, and the other will stay.

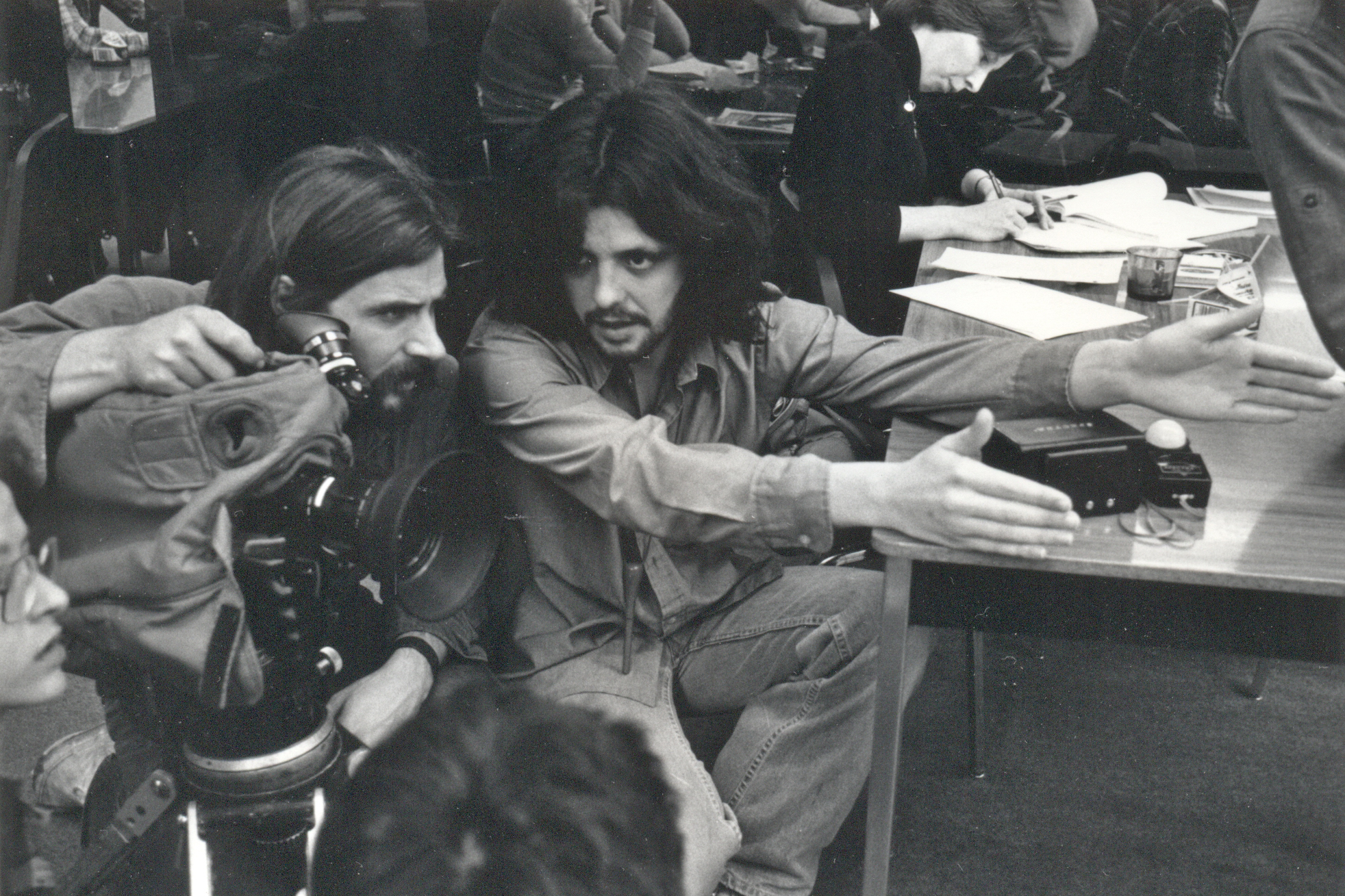
Alain Dupras and André Blanchard during filming

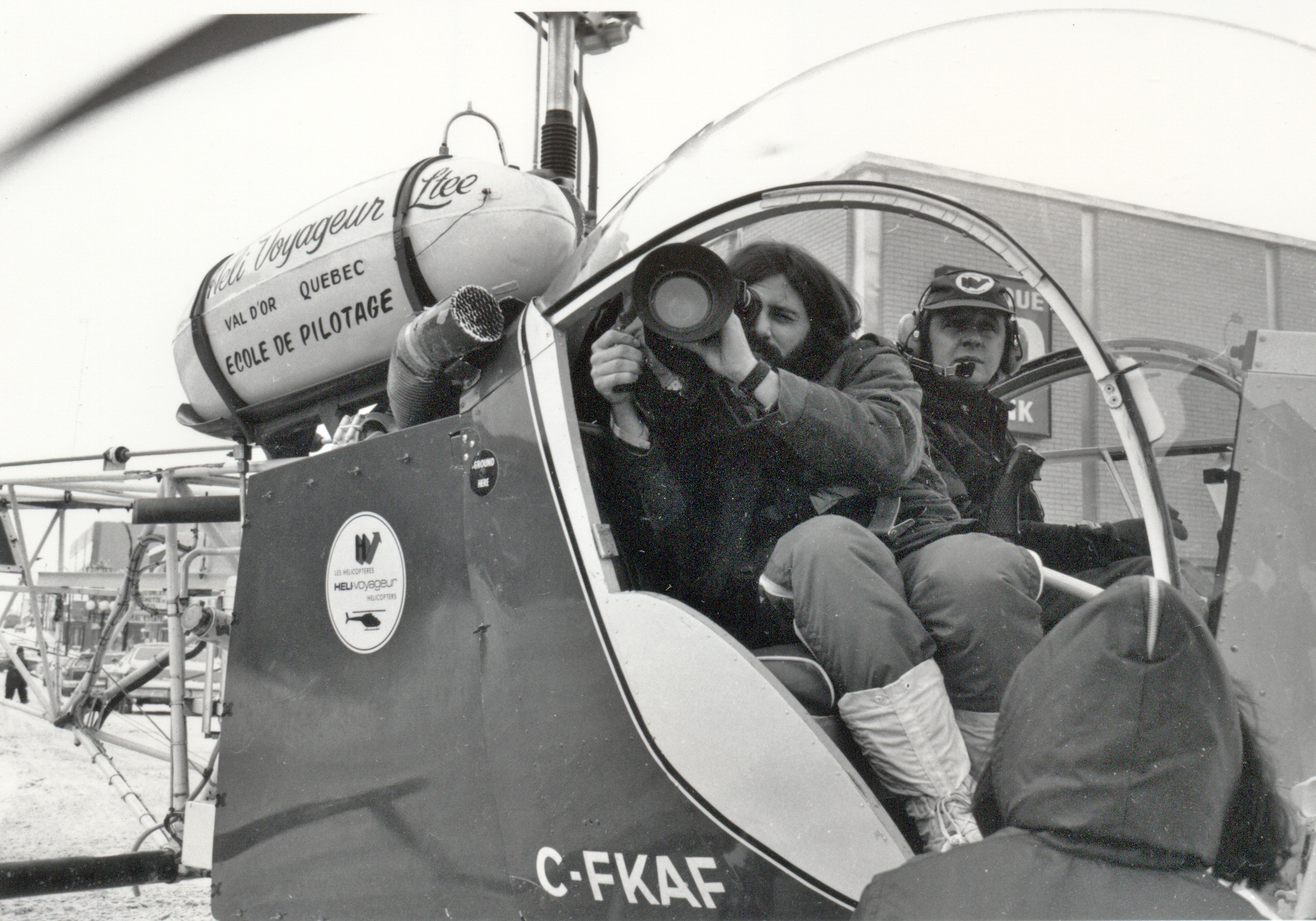
Filming with helicopter in Rouyn
