= Ultimatum (1973 film) =

1973 film

- Directed by: Jean Pierre Lefebvre
- Written by: Jean Pierre Lefebvre
- Produced by: Marguerite Duparc
- Starring: Jean-René Ouellet; Francine Morand
- Cinematography: Jacques Leduc
- Edited by: Marguerite Duparc
- Music by: Walter Boudreau
- Production company: Les films JP Lefebvre
- Distributed by: Disci
- Release date: November 16, 1973
- Running time: 127 minutes
- Country: Canada
- Language: French

Ultimatum is a Canadian drama film, written and directed by Jean Pierre Lefebvre and released in 1973. The film stars Jean-René Ouellet and Francine Morand as Arthur and Charlotte, a couple whose relationship is affected by the political climate around the October Crisis of 1970.

The cast also includes Lee J. Cobb and Franco Gasparri.

According to Lefebvre, the film "tries to personalise a political experience, to interiorise a vision of an event which was completely new for Quebec, a country, which had never known an army of occupation, etc. For me the only way to politicise people is to personalise political issues". The film's ultimate theme is that one is a member of their society regardless of whether they agree or disagree with the issues being confronted within it.

The film was released in November 1973, within weeks of his films Pigs Are Seldom Clean (On n'engraisse pas les cochons à l'eau claire) and The Last Betrothal (Les dernières fiançailles). Despite this it was the least-screened and least-reviewed of the three films; even upon its release, Michel Brûlé of Cinéma Québec reviewed the other two films together while virtually glossing over Ultimatum apart from a single mention. Following its premiere, the film received little further distribution except for occasional Lefebvre retrospective events.
