= Jean Pierre Lefebvre =

French Canadian filmmaker (born 1941)

- Born: 17 August 1941 (age 84); Montreal, Quebec, Canada
- Occupations: Film director Screenwriter
- Years active: 1965–present
- Spouse: Marguerite Duparc (1960s-1982, her death)

Jean Pierre Lefebvre (French: [ʒɑ̃ pjɛʁ ləfɛvʁ]; born 17 August 1941) is a Canadian filmmaker. He is widely admired as "the godfather of independent Canadian cinema," particularly among young, independent filmmakers.

== Biography ==
Jean Pierre Lefebvre studied literature at the University of Montréal and taught for two years at the Jesuit-run Loyola College in Montreal (now part of Concordia University). He began writing as a film critic, first for Quartier Latin, then for Séquences and Objectif. He directed his first film, a short drama, then three independent features. He joined the National Film Board of Canada and made two films, including the 1968 feature My Friend Pierrette (Mon amie Pierrette), co-starring Raôul Duguay and produced by Clément Perron. Lefebvre was then asked to head the NFB's French-language fiction studio. He began its Premières Oeuvres series, designed to make low-budget shorts and features. Four features and a number of shorts were produced within a year before the initiative was terminated, and Lefebvre left to form his own production company, Cinak, with his wife and editor, Marguerite Duparc. He writes and produces all his own films.

Lefebvre was one of the first Canadian filmmakers to receive international acclaim for his work; his film Don't Let It Kill You (Il ne faut pas mourir pour ça) (1967) was the first Canadian film to be invited to the Cannes Film Festival. He proved to be successful again at Cannes when he received the International Critics' Prize for Les fleurs sauvages (1982) and his film Le jour S... (1984) was screened in the Un Certain Regard section. His 1973 film The Last Betrothal (Les dernières fiançailles) won the prestigious Prix de l'Organisation catholique internationale du cinéma in 1974.

Il ne faut pas mourir pour ça (1967), Le Vieux pays où Rimbaud est mort (1977), and Aujourd'hui ou jamais (1997) make up his Abel Trilogy; three feature films starring the recurring character of Abel Gagné played by Marcel Sabourin.

In 1991, he was made an Officer of the Order of Canada "for his innovative and high-quality feature films". In 1995 he was awarded the Prix Albert-Tessier. In 2013, Lefebvre received a Governor General's Performing Arts Award.

== Filmography ==
=== Features ===
- The Revolutionary (Le révolutionnaire) – 1965
- Don't Let It Kill You (Il ne faut pas mourir pour ça) – 1967
- Patricia and Jean-Baptiste (Patricia et Jean-Baptiste) – 1968
- My Friend Pierrette (Mon amie Pierrette) – 1969
- Straight to the Heart (Jusqu'au coeur) – 1969
- The House of Light (La chambre blanche) – 1969
- Q-Bec My Love (Un succès commercial, ou Q-bec My Love) – 1970
- Those Damned Savages (Les maudits sauvages) – 1971
- My Eye (Mon œil) – 1971
- Ultimatum – 1973
- The Last Betrothal (Les dernières fiançailles) – 1973
- Pigs Are Seldom Clean (On n'engraisse pas les cochons à l'eau claire) – 1973
- Confidences of the Night (L'amour blessé) – 1975
- The Man from the Movies (Le gars des vues) – 1976
- The Old Country Where Rimbaud Died (Le vieux pays où Rimbaud est mort) – 1977
- To Be Sixteen (Avoir 16 ans) – 1979
- Wild Flowers (Les fleurs sauvages) – 1982
- Le jour S... – 1984
- The Box of Sun (La boite à soleil) – 1988
- The Fabulous Voyage of the Angel (Le fabuleux voyage de l'ange) – 1991
- Now or Never (Aujourd'hui ou jamais) – 1998
- La Route des cieux – 2010

=== Other work ===
- L'homoman (Short film, 1964)
- To the Rhythm of My Heart (Au rythme de mon coeur) (Documentary, 1983)
- Alfred Laliberté sculpteur (Documentary, 1987)
- Ensemble (Video, 1988)
- Sentiers secrets (Video, 1988)
- Laubach Literacy of Canada: The Changing Workplace (Documentary short, 1989)
- Atelier altitude (Short film, 1993)
- Il était une fois Sabrina et Manu (Short film, 1994)
- L'Âge des images (Series of 5 videos, 1994–1995)
- H comme hasard (Short film, 1999) (Part of the collective anthology project Un abécédaire)
- See You in Toronto (Short film, 2000)
- Le manuscript érotique (TV movie, 2002)
- Mon ami Michel (documentary, 2004)
