= Walter Boudreau =

Canadian musician

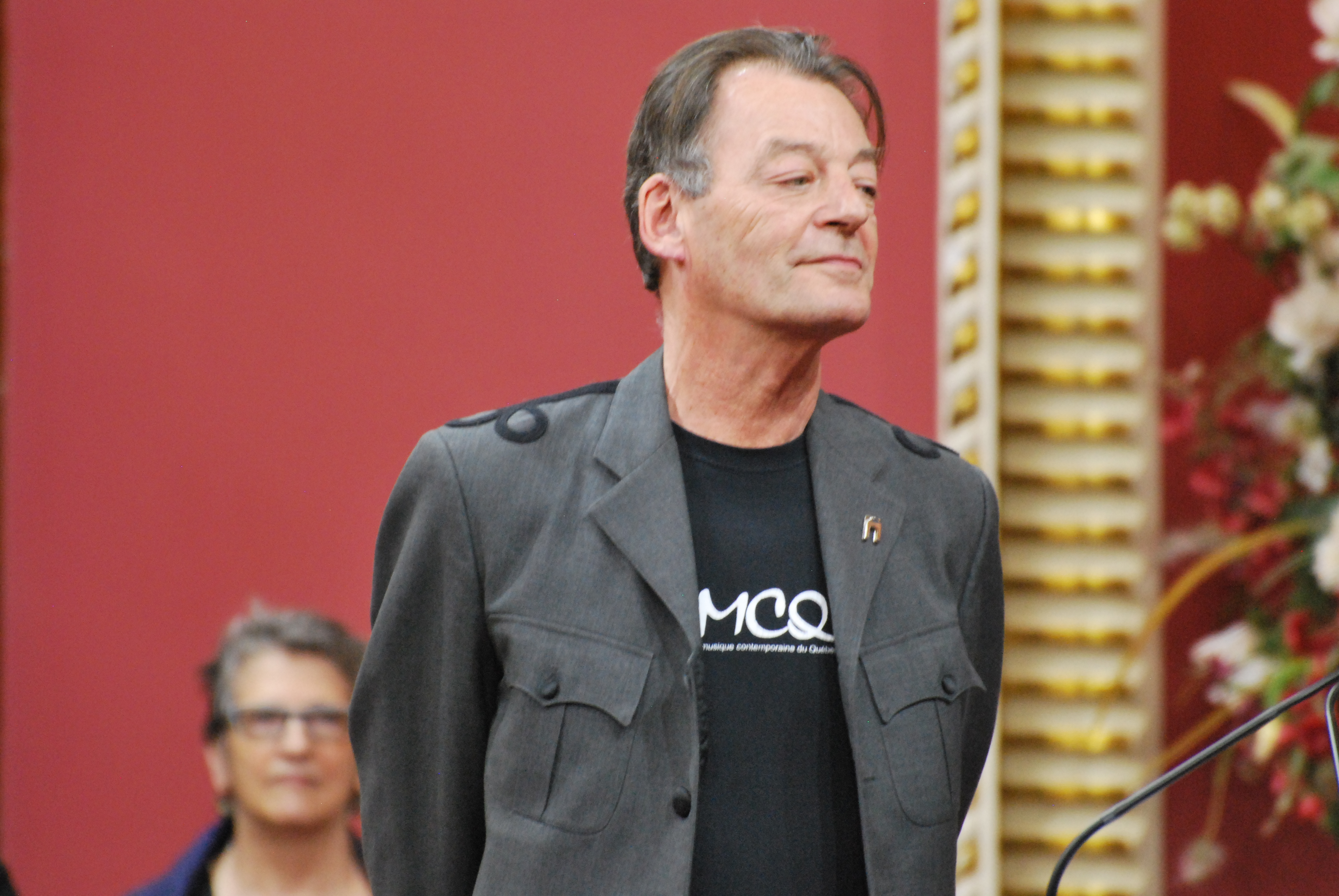
- Walter Boudreau at the award ceremony for the National Order of Quebec in June 2013.
- Born: 1947 (age 78–79)
- Occupations: Quebecois composer, saxophonist and conductor.

Walter Boudreau, CM CQ (born 1947 in Sorel) is a Canadian composer, saxophonist and conductor. In 1969, he founded the group L'Infonie with Raoul Duguay, which dissolved in 1973. Since 1988, he has been the artistic director of the Société de musique contemporaine du Québec in Montreal. He was a principal collaborator in the Symphonie du Millénaire which took place in Montréal in 2000. In May 2015 Boudreau received a Governor General's Performing Arts Award, Canada's highest honour in the performing arts.

== Teachers ==
- Serge Garant
- Mauricio Kagel
- György Ligeti
- Bruce Mather
- Karlheinz Stockhausen
- Gilles Tremblay
- Iannis Xenakis

== Films ==
- La Nuit de la poésie 27 mars 1970, 1971
- Ultimatum, 1973
- Unfinished Infonie (L'Infonie inachevée...), 1973
- Fanfares, 1988

== Awards ==
- 1982 - Prix Jules-Léger
- 1998 - Prix Opus : compositeur de l'année
- 2003 - Molson Prize
- 2004 - Prix Denise-Pelletier
- 2013 - Knight of the National Order of Quebec
- 2013 - Member of the Order of Canada
- 2015 - Governor General's Performing Arts Award
- Grants from the Canadian Arts Council
- National Young Composers Competition (Radio-Canada)

== See also ==
- Music of Canada
- List of Canadian composers
