= Prix Albert-Tessier =

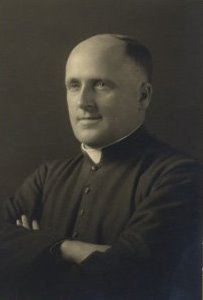
Albert Tessier, circa 1938

The Prix Albert-Tessier is an award by the Government of Quebec that is part of the Prix du Québec, given to individuals for an outstanding career in Quebec cinema. It is awarded to script-writing, acting, composing music, directing, producing and cinematographic techniques. It is named in honour of Albert Tessier.

== Winners ==
- 1980 – Arthur Lamothe
- 1981 – Pierre Lamy
- 1982 – Norman McLaren
- 1983 – Maurice Blackburn
- 1984 – Claude Jutra
- 1985 – Gilles Groulx
- 1986 – Michel Brault
- 1987 – Rock Demers
- 1988 – Anne Claire Poirier
- 1989 – Denys Arcand
- 1990 – Gilles Carle
- 1991 – Frédéric Back
- 1992 – Jean-Claude Labrecque
- 1993 – Francis Mankiewicz
- 1994 – Pierre Perrault
- 1995 – Jean Pierre Lefebvre
- 1996 – Jacques Giraldeau
- 1997 – Colin Low
- 1998 – Georges Dufaux
- 1999 – Roger Frappier
- 2000 – Micheline Lanctôt
- 2001 – René Jodoin
- 2002 – Robert Daudelin
- 2003 – André Forcier
- 2004 – Pierre Hébert
- 2005 – Fernand Dansereau
- 2006 – Léa Pool
- 2007 – Pierre Mignot
- 2008 – Jacques Leduc
- 2009 – Paule Baillargeon
- 2010 – Werner Nold
- 2011 – Marcel Carrière
- 2012 – André Melançon
- 2013 – Robert Morin
- 2014 – Manon Barbeau
- 2015 – Martin Duckworth
- 2016 – Alanis Obomsawin
- 2017 – Michèle Cournoyer
- 2018 – André Gladu
- 2019 – Pauline Vaillancourt
- 2020 – André Laliberté
- 2021 – Serge Giguère
- 2022 – Mireille Dansereau
- 2023 – Tahani Rached
- 2024 – Denis Côté
- 2025 – Helen Doyle
