= Q-Bec My Love =

1970 film by Jean Pierre Lefebvre

- French: Un succès commercial, ou Q-Bec My Love
- Directed by: Jean Pierre Lefebvre
- Written by: Jean Pierre Lefebvre
- Produced by: Marguerite Duparc
- Starring: Anne Lauriault; Denis Payne; Jean-Pierre Cartier; Larry Kent
- Cinematography: Thomas Vámos
- Edited by: Marguerite Duparc
- Music by: Andrée Paul
- Production company: Cinak
- Distributed by: Faroun Films
- Release date: 1970
- Running time: 76 minutes
- Country: Canada
- Language: French
- Budget: $25,000
- Box office: $140,000

Q-Bec My Love (French: Un succès commercial, ou Q-Bec My Love) is a Canadian film, directed by Jean Pierre Lefebvre and released in 1970. A satirical allegory for Quebec nationalism, the film is depicted in disconnected vignettes which portray the professional, sexual and romantic relationships of Q-Bec (Anne Lauriault) with her boss Peter Ottawa (Denis Payne), her husband Jean-Baptiste Bilingue (Jean-Pierre Cartier) and her lover Sam Washington (Larry Kent).

== Production ==
Q-Bec My Love was filmed from 8 November to 12 November 1969, with a budget of $25,000 (equivalent to $208,376 in 2025).

== Release ==
The film was released in Montreal on 12 March 1970, by Faroun Films and grossed $140,000 (equivalent to $1,132,414 in 2025) at the box office and $7,000 was given to Lefebvre.

== Awards ==
The film was historically most noted for setting off a crisis in the Canadian Film Awards, when Lefebvre threatened to withdraw the film from the competition if the Ontario Censor Board did not rescind its demand for the film's explicit sexuality to be edited. Several other filmmakers were also prepared to withdraw in solidarity, although provincial cabinet minister James Auld intervened to dissuade the board from insisting on the cuts. The film screening went ahead, but film directors from Quebec continued to perceive a systemic bias against them; in 1973, a number of Quebec filmmakers entirely boycotted the awards. This later protest resulted in the last-minute cancellation of the 1973 awards ceremony, with the winners announced only at a press conference, and the complete cancellation of the 1974 awards.

== Works cited ==
- Turner, D. John, ed. (1987). Canadian Feature Film Index: 1913-1985. Canadian Film Institute. ISBN 0660533642.
- Melnyk, George (2004). One Hundred Years of Canadian Cinema. University of Toronto Press. ISBN 080203568X.
