= To the Rhythm of My Heart =

1983 Canadian documentary film

- French: Au rythme de mon cœur
- Directed by: Jean Pierre Lefebvre
- Produced by: Jim Kelly
- Cinematography: Jean Pierre Lefebvre
- Edited by: Jean Pierre Lefebvre
- Production company: Cinak
- Distributed by: J.A. Lapointe Films
- Release date: September 11, 1983
- Running time: 80 minutes
- Country: Canada
- Language: French

To the Rhythm of My Heart (French: Au rythme de mon cœur) is a Canadian documentary film, directed by Jean Pierre Lefebvre and released in 1983. Made during his national tour of Canada for a 1981 retrospective of his films compiled by the Canadian Film Institute, the film is a video diary documenting both his philosophical and creative discussions on the co-operative movement in cinema as part of the tour and the concurrent illness and death of his wife, film editor and producer Marguerite Duparc.

The film's origins were in a short "video postcard" that Lefebvre had planned to record for film studies students at Ryerson University after hosting a workshop there in 1980. Much of the film was shot with an old Bolex camera that had to be frequently rewound, leading Lefebvre — long known for films that had a slow, languid pacing — to quip "Don't be worried, there are no long shots, so it's my fastest film."

The film premiered at the 1983 Toronto International Film Festival. Jay Scott of The Globe and Mail positively reviewed the film, writing that "The images he finds are wonderful: a long sequence, scored to a Moog he reports he purchased "from Radio Shack", of lights flickering on water; a black Labrador Retriever, suspicious in the white snow; a kitten, worrying a baby mouse to death; and a ferry with railings stark and rigid in formal frontality, like a Christopher Pratt print reconstituted for the silver screen. To The Rhythm of My Heart is experimental and non-linear - "the emotion is really in the form of the film," as Lefebvre puts it - but it is usually fascinating and never forbidding."

The film received a Genie Award nomination for Best Feature Length Documentary at the 6th Genie Awards in 1985.
