= Confidences of the Night =

1975 Canadian film

- French: L'Amour blessé
- Directed by: Jean Pierre Lefebvre
- Written by: Jean-Pierre Lefebvre
- Produced by: Marguerite Duparc
- Starring: Louise Cuerrier
- Cinematography: Jean-Charles Tremblay
- Edited by: Marguerite Duparc
- Production company: Cinak
- Distributed by: Disci
- Release date: October 21, 1975
- Running time: 78 minutes
- Country: Canada
- Language: French

Confidences of the Night (French: L'Amour blessé, lit. "Wounded Love") is a 1975 Canadian drama film written and directed by Jean Pierre Lefebvre. The film stars Louise Cuerrier as a lonely single woman who is spending her evening at home accompanied only by the voices of other people, such as a radio phone-in show and noise from the neighbours heard through the wall; the film's limited plot unfolds when she calls the radio show to talk about leaving her abusive ex-husband, only to then receive angry phone calls from him and his mother.

Cuerrier herself is the only cast member seen on screen in the film; the offscreen voices are provided by a cast including Gilles Proulx, Paule Baillargeon, Pierre Curzi, Frédérique Collin, Monique Mercure, Jean-Guy Moreau, Denise Morelle, Lise Demers and Guy Thauvette.

The film opened in theatres in October 1975. It was later screened out of competition at the 1976 Cannes Film Festival.

== Synopsis ==
Louise, a 26-year-old factory worker, returns home late, as she does every night, to her small Montreal apartment. Living in solitude since her husband left her, she escapes by listening to the radio, particularly a talk show where she projects her own situation onto other women in distress.

== Critical response ==
For Cinema Canada, Connie Tadros wrote that "Nothing happens. Not even the camera moves much. Lefebvre is content to hold the image and to let the woman walk in and out of the frame as if her lassitude has affected the whole crew. She does her nails, bathes and listens. She is alone and defeated. The tabloid papers and the sensational hot-lines keep her company and create the sensation of excitement, of something unusual."
