= The House of Light =

1969 Canadian film

- French: La Chambre blanche
- Directed by: Jean Pierre Lefebvre
- Written by: Jean-Pierre Lefebvre
- Produced by: Marguerite Duparc
- Starring: Marcel Sabourin; Michèle Magny
- Cinematography: Thomas Vámos
- Edited by: Marguerite Duparc
- Music by: Walter Boudreau
- Production company: Cinak
- Distributed by: Faroun Films
- Release date: July 31, 1969
- Running time: 78 minutes
- Country: Canada
- Language: French

The House of Light (French: La Chambre blanche, lit. "The White Room") is a Canadian drama film, directed by Jean Pierre Lefebvre and released in 1969. The film stars Marcel Sabourin and Michèle Magny as a husband and wife who are interacting entirely in their bedroom, engaging in conversations about their relationship while the scenery outside their bedroom window provides the only major visual change in setting.

The film premiered in July 1969. It was subsequently screened in the Directors' Fortnight program at the 1970 Cannes Film Festival.

The film was included in Jean Pierre Lefebvre: Vidéaste, a retrospective program of Lefebvre's films at the 2001 Toronto International Film Festival.
