= Marcel Sabourin =

Canadian actor and writer from Quebec (born 1935)

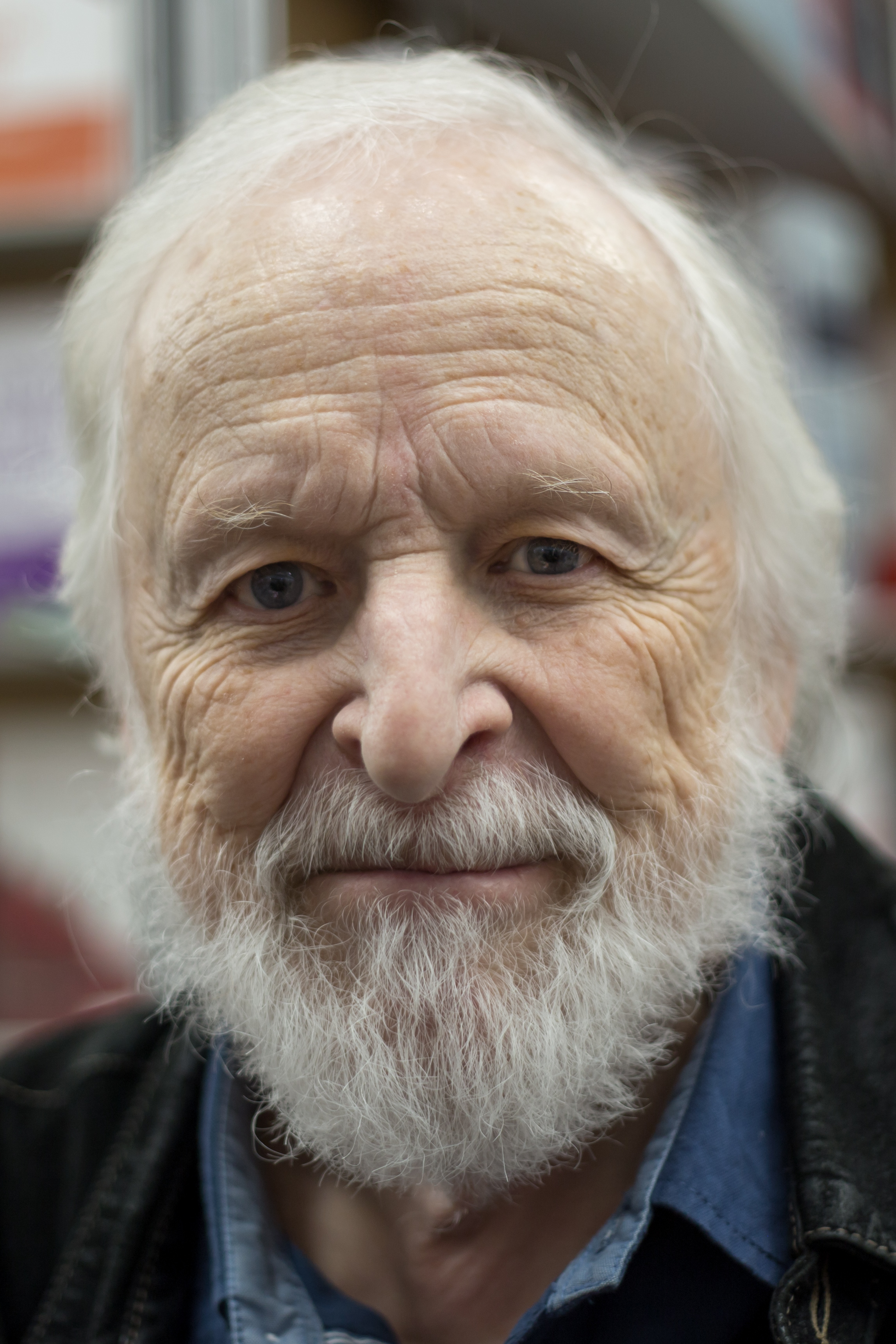
- Born: March 25, 1935 (age 91); Montreal, Quebec
- Occupations: actor, writer
- Years active: 1950s-present
- Notable work: J.A. Martin Photographer, Don't Let It Kill You, The Old Country Where Rimbaud Died

Marcel Sabourin, OC (born March 25, 1935) is a Canadian actor and writer from Quebec. He is most noted for his role as Abel Gagné, the central character in Jean Pierre Lefebvre's trilogy of Don't Let It Kill You (Il ne faut pas mourir pour ça), The Old Country Where Rimbaud Died (Le Vieux pays où Rimbaud est mort) and Now or Never (Aujourd'hui ou jamais), and his performance as Professor Mandibule in the children's television series Les Croquignoles and La ribouldingue.

== Career ==
Sabourin launched his career in the 1950s with La Roulotte, a children's theatre troupe launched by Paul Buissonneau which performed in Montreal's public parks. He studied at Collège Sainte-Marie de Montréal and the Théâtre du Nouveau Monde, and in Paris under Jacques Lecoq. One of the most prolific performers in the history of the Cinema of Quebec, he has had film, television and stage credits since 1956.

He won a Canadian Film Award for Best Actor in a Non-Feature at the 25th Canadian Film Awards in 1973 for Weapons and Men (Des armes et les hommes), and was a two-time Canadian Film Award and Genie Award nominee for Best Actor, receiving nods at the 28th Canadian Film Awards in 1977 for J.A. Martin Photographer (J.A. Martin photographe) and at the 4th Genie Awards in 1983 for Sweet Lies and Loving Oaths (Doux aveux). As a screenwriter, he was nominated for Best Adapted Screenplay at the 1st Genie Awards in 1980, as cowriter with Jean Beaudin of the film Cordélia.

At Quebec's Jutra Awards, he was a two-time Best Actor nominee for Now or Never at the 1st Jutra Awards in 1999, and for Another House (L'Autre maison) at the 16th Jutra Awards in 2014, and was the recipient of the Jutra-Hommage lifetime achievement award in 1999.

As a playwright he is most noted for Pleurer pour rire, which won the Floyd S. Chalmers Canadian Play Award in the youth theatre division in 1983, and was shortlisted for the Governor General's Award for French-language drama at the 1984 Governor General's Awards.

He has also taught at the National Theatre School of Canada.

== Personal life ==
He married his wife Françoise in the 1960s. They have had four children, including actor and screenwriter Gabriel Sabourin and cinematographer Jérôme Sabourin. Jérôme was the director of At the End of Nothing at All (Au boute du rien pantoute), a documentary film about his father which premiered in 2024.

== Filmography ==
=== Television ===
- 1963 - Ti-Jean caribou
- 1963 - Les Croquignoles as Mandibule
- 1968 - La Ribouldingue as Mandibule
- 1976 - Grand-Papa as Martin Roy
- 1976 - Du tac au tac as Bruno Félix
- 1978 - Duplessis as Joseph-Damase Bégin
- 1979 - Riel as Joseph-Noël Ritchot
- 1981 - Salut ! J.W. as Marc
- 1982 - La Bonne Aventure as Marcel Poliquin
- 1984 - Laurier as Joseph Lavergne
- 1985 - The Cuckoo Bird as Jake
- 1989 - He Shoots, He Scores as Marcel Allaire
- 1989 - Mount Royal as Gilbert Valeur
- 1990 - La Fille du Maquignon as Curé Dumouchel
- 1991 - Berlin Lady as Marquis D'Abrantes
- 1992 - Montréal ville ouverte
- 1992 - Coup de chance
- 1994 - Trial at Fortitude Bay as Judge Jean Lamberts
- 1994 - Les grands procès as Couronne
- 1994 - Million Dollar Babies as Père Nadeau
- 1996 - Omertà as Premier of Quebec
- 1998 - La Part des anges as Joachim Brodeur
- 1999 - Deux frères as Viateur Craig
- 2000 - Gypsies as Rosaire Baril
- 2000 - Le Monde de Charlotte as Alexandre Ducharme
- 2000 - Jackie Bouvier Kennedy Onassis as Charles de Gaulle
- 2000 - Willie as Père Tourangeau
- 2001 - Emma as Yves Dauphin
- 2005 - Trudeau II: Maverick in the Making as Maurice Duplessis
- 2009 - Les Parent as Bernard Rivard
- 2010 - Trauma as Mr. Lemieux
- 2012 - Les Sioui-Bacon as Mr. Robert
- 2012 - Toute la vérité as Judge Régimbald
- 2022 – La Faille as Pere Gabriel

=== Film ===
- 1965 - Mission of Fear (Astataïon, ou Le Festin des morts)
- 1967 - Don't Let It Kill You (Il ne faut pas mourir pour ça) as Abel Gagné
- 1969 - The House of Light (La Chambre blanche)
- 1970 - Two Women in Gold (Deux femmes en or) as Yvon-T. Turcot
- 1971 - Those Damned Savages (Les maudits sauvages) as Jean Talon
- 1971 - The Christmas Martian (Le Martien de Noël) as The Martian / The Visitor
- 1971 - We Are Far from the Sun (On est loin du soleil) as Robert Bessette
- 1972 - The Wise Guys (Les Smattes) as Le Curé
- 1972 - Dirty Money (La Maudite Galette) as Ernest
- 1972 - The Time of the Hunt (Le Temps d'une chasse) as Richard
- 1973 - Weapons and Men (Des armes et les hommes)
- 1973 - The Death of a Lumberjack (La Mort d'un bûcheron) as Ti-Noir L'Espérance
- 1973 - Taureau as Serge Beaudoin
- 1973 - Oh, If Only My Monk Would Want (Ah ! Si mon moine voulait...) as Le Religieux
- 1973 - The Last Betrothal (Les Dernières Fiançailles) as Doctor
- 1974 - Bingo as Leader of The Separatist Party
- 1975 - Mustang as Fred
- 1975 - Gina
- 1975 - Eliza's Horoscope as Perverted Doctor
- 1977 - Bernie and the Gang (Ti-Mine, Bernie pis la gang...) as Ti-Mine
- 1977 - J.A. Martin Photographer (J.A. Martin photographe) as Joseph-Albert Martin
- 1977 - The Old Country Where Rimbaud Died (Le Vieux Pays où Rimbaud est mort) as Abel Gagné
- 1980 - The Castle of Cards (Le Château de cartes) as Janvier Pastel
- 1980 - Cordélia as Sheriff Lapointe
- 1980 - The Handyman (L'Homme à tout faire) as Georges Poitras, Chauffeur
- 1982 - Sweet Lies and Loving Oaths (Doux aveux) as Clovis Lavallée
- 1984 - Le jour S...
- 1984 - Mario as Therapist
- 1986 - Equinox (Équinoxe)
- 1988 - The Revolving Doors (Les Portes tournantes) as Man On The Train
- 1989 - Lessons on Life (Trois pommes à côté du sommeil) as Bertrand
- 1989 - Sous les draps, les étoiles
- 1989 - Jesus of Montreal (Jésus de Montréal) as The Eccentric
- 1991 - The Fabulous Voyage of the Angel (Le Fabuleux Voyage de l'ange) as Rival
- 1991 - The Hitman as André Lacombe
- 1992 - Double or Nothing: The Rise and Fall of Robert Campeau as Robert Campeau
- 1994 - Meurtre en musique as Inspector Borel
- 1994 - La Fête des rois
- 1994 - The Wind from Wyoming (Le Vent du Wyoming) as Père Lachaise
- 1996 - The Ear of a Deaf Man (L'Oreille d'un sourd) as Léon Bellavance
- 1996 - The Old Man Who Wanted to Climb to Heaven (L'Homme perché) as Raymond Deschamps
- 1996 - Lilies as Bishop Jean Bilodeau
- 1998 - Julie and Me (Revoir Julie) as Monsieur Provencher
- 1998 - Now or Never (Aujourd'hui ou jamais) as Abel Gagné
- 1999 - Memories Unlocked (Souvenirs intimes) as Dr. Patenaude
- 2000 - See You in Toronto as Samuel de Champlain
- 2001 - Ne dis rien as Tuyau
- 2002 - The Sum of All Fears as Monsieur Monceau
- 2004 - White Skin (La Peau blanche) as Dr. Paul-Émile Gagnon
- 2005 - Idole instantanée as Séverin
- 2007 - My Aunt Aline (Ma tante Aline) as Claude Langevin
- 2012 - Mars & Avril (Mars et Avril) as Capucin
- 2013 - Another House (L'autre maison) as Henri Bernard
- 2013 - Amsterdam as Old Man at Dinner
- 2014 - Henri Henri as Martial Binot
- 2015 - Ego Trip as Daniel Valiquette
- 2016 - Night Song (Mobile Étoile) as Jean-Paul Dussault
- 2017 - The Center of the World (Le Centre du monde) as Grandfather
- 2020 - The Sticky Side of Baklava (La Face cachée du baklava) as Guy
- 2022 - Niagara as Léopold Lamothe
- 2023 - Testament
- 2023 - Victoire (La Cordonnière) as Jo Milo
- 2024 - At the End of Nothing at All (Au boute du rien pantoute) as himself
- 2024 - Beaupré the Giant (Géant Beaupré)
