= To Be Sixteen =

1979 film

- French: Avoir 16 ans
- Directed by: Jean Pierre Lefebvre
- Written by: Jean Pierre Lefebvre; Claude Paquette
- Produced by: Marguerite Duparc
- Starring: Yves Benoît; Aubert Pallascio; Gilles Renaud
- Cinematography: Guy Dufaux
- Edited by: Marguerite Duparc
- Music by: Gilles Bellemare; Alain Lamontagne; Paul Piché
- Production company: Cinak
- Release date: May 1979 (Cannes)
- Running time: 106 minutes
- Country: Canada
- Language: French

To Be Sixteen (French: Avoir 16 ans) is a Canadian drama film, directed by Jean Pierre Lefebvre and released in 1979. The film stars Yves Benoît as Louis, a 16-year-old high school student who is sent to a mental institution by his father (Aubert Pallascio) to punish him for his rebelliousness, and is under the care of a psychiatrist (Gilles Renaud).

The film's cast also includes Marthe Choquette, Michèle Magny, Éric Beauséjour, Frédérique Collin, Pierre Curzi, Lise L'Heureux and Jean Marchand.

The film premiered in the Directors Fortnight stream at the 1979 Cannes Film Festival, and was later screened in the Critics Choice program at the 1979 Festival of Festivals.
