= André Melançon =

Canadian actor, screenwriter and film director

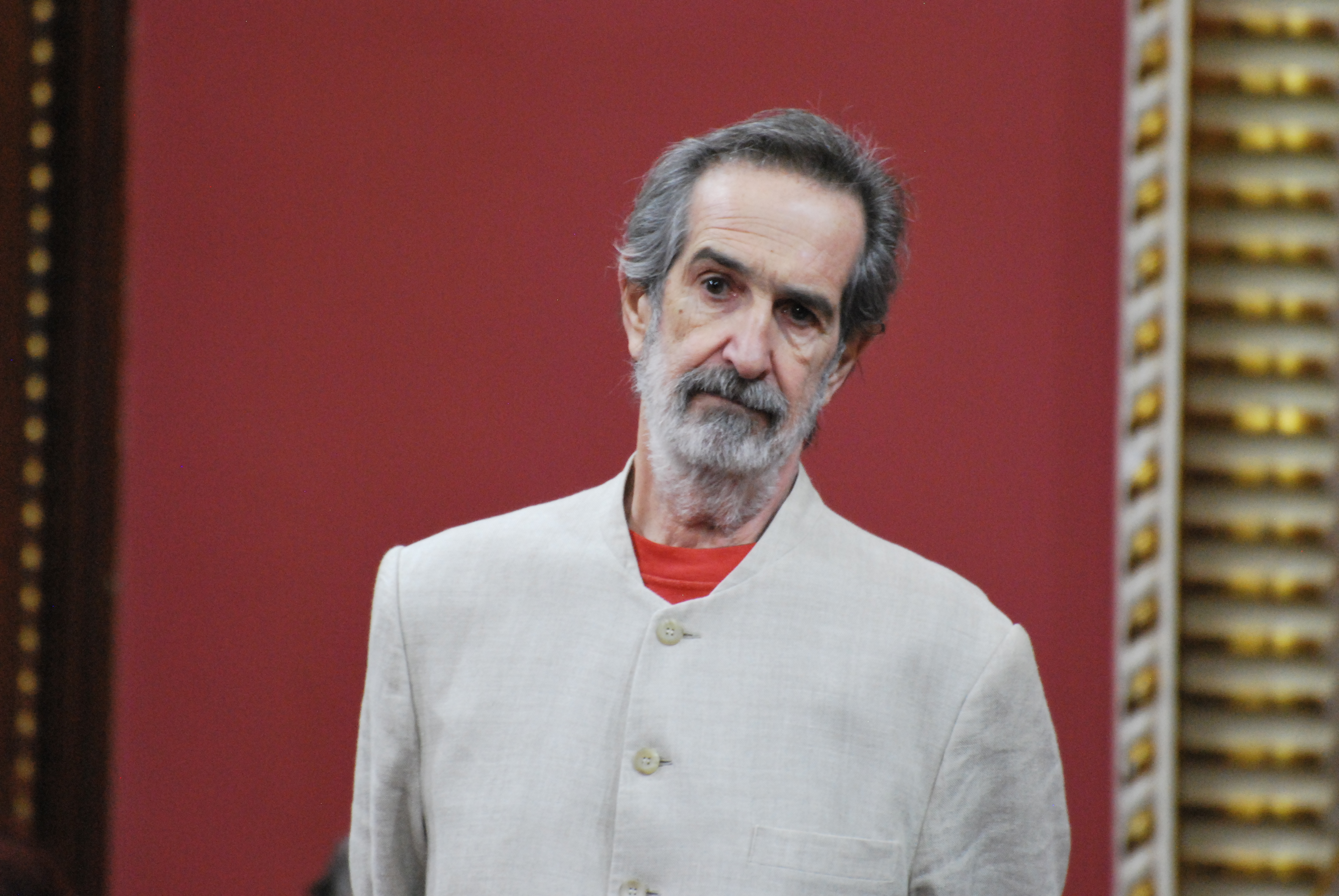
- Born: February 18, 1942; Rouyn-Noranda, Quebec, Canada
- Died: August 23, 2016 (aged 74); Montreal, Quebec, Canada
- Occupations: Actor, screenwriter, film director
- Known for: The Dog Who Stopped the War, Bach and Broccoli
- Spouse: Andrée Lachapelle

André Melançon (February 18, 1942 - August 23, 2016) was a Canadian actor, screenwriter and film director, best known for directing and writing several installments in the Tales for All series of children's films.

== Career ==
The versatile André Mélançon – director, writer and actor – set out to become a youth guidance counsellor before he veered into film. His background in psychology and education helped orient his filmmaking toward films about, with, and for children. His first film was on Quebec separatist Charles Gagnon, then at the request of producer Jean Dansereau he directed a trio of short films for children in the early 1970s that confirmed the direction of his career. He turned to acting and won a Canadian Film Award for his performance in Bound for Glory (Partis pour la gloire). In the 1980s he directed The Dog Who Stopped the War, which won the Golden Reel Award, and Bach et bottine, and wrote, with Jacques Bobet, Tadpole and the Whale also a Golden Reel Award winner.

In 2012 Mélançon received the Prix Albert-Tessier, given to him by the Quebec government for his esteemed career in Quebec cinema. In 2013 he was awarded the National Order of Quebec and in 2015 he received the Lifetime Achievement Jutra-Award.

== Filmography ==
=== Actor ===
Year	Title	Role	Notes
1973	Taureau	Taureau	
1973	Réjeanne Padovani	Lucien Bertrand	
1973	Les Allées de la terre		
1975	Bound for Glory (Partis pour la gloire)	Lieutenant Laroche	Winner, Canadian Film Award for Best Actor
1982	Sweet Lies and Loving Oaths (Doux aveux)	Reynald	
1982	The Emperor of Peru (La Traversée de la Pacific)	Pirate	
1984	The Dog Who Stopped the War (La Guerre des tuques)	Daniel Blanchette de Victoriaville	
1986	Intimate Power (Pouvoir intime)	Pursuer	
1987	The Great Land of Small (C'est pas parce qu'on est petit qu'on peut pas être grand)	Gardien	
1988	Unfaithful Mornings (Les Matins infidèles)	Angry motorist	
1988	The Mills of Power (Les Tisserands du pouvoir)		
1988	He Shoots, He Scores (Lance et compte)	Sylvain	Second season
1992	The Dark Side of the Heart (El Lado oscuro del corazón)	Erik	
1992	Coup de chance		TV
1993	Refugio en la ciudad		
1993	Because Why	Garbage Man #1	
1993	A Wall of Silence (Un Muro de silencio)		
1995	Le Billet de loterie (Une petite fille particulière)	Muche	TV
1996	Poverty and Other Delights (Joyeux Calvaire)	Armand	
2001	Druids (Vercingétorix : La légende du druide roi)	Vercingetorix	

=== Director ===
Year	Title
1973	Weapons and Men (Des armes et les hommes)
1974	Le Violon de Gaston
1974	« Les Oreilles » mène l'enquête
1974	Les Tacots
1978	Les Vrais Perdants
1978	The Backstreet Six (Comme les six doigts de la main)
1980	L'Espace d'un été
1984	La Route des étoiles
1984	The Dog Who Stopped the War (La Guerre des tuques)
1986	Bach and Broccoli (Bach et Bottine)
1987	Le Lys cassé
1989	Summer of the Colt (Fierro, l'été des secrets)
1990	The Blizzard (Rafales)
1991	Nénette
1996	Le Boulard
1997	Cher Olivier
2000	Albertine in Five Times (Albertine, en cinq temps)
2001	On Your Head (Le Ciel sur la tête)
2002	Asbestos
2004	Daniel and the Superdogs
2013	Les trains de la vie
