= Taureau (film) =

1973 film by Clément Perron

- Directed by: Clément Perron
- Written by: Clément Perron
- Produced by: Marc Beaudet
- Starring: André Melançon; Monique Lepage; Michèle Magny; Marcel Sabourin
- Cinematography: Georges Dufaux
- Edited by: Pierre Lemelin
- Music by: Jean Cousineau
- Production company: National Film Board of Canada
- Release date: February 1, 1973
- Running time: 98 minutes
- Country: Canada
- Language: French

Taureau is a Canadian drama film, directed by Clément Perron and released in 1973. The film centres on the Gilberts, a family in a small town in the Beauce region of Quebec who become a target of social ostracism when their intellectually slow but physically strong and handsome son Taureau (André Melançon) initiates a relationship with Denise (Michèle Magny), the town school teacher.

The film was Perron's first solo-directed narrative fiction feature, following a career principally making documentary films.

The cast also includes Monique Lepage, Béatrice Picard, Marcel Sabourin, Yvon Thiboutot, Amulette Garneau, Louise Portal, André Cartier, Yvan Canuel, Jacques Bilodeau, Marguerite Lemir, Denis Drouin, Anne Létourneau, Marthe Mercure, Edgar Fruitier, Bonfield Marcoux and Pat Gagnon.

== Critical response ==
Martin Knelman of The Globe and Mail wrote that "The film has intimations of a western morality play and a Deep South melodrama, but it's unmistakably Quebecois in style. You don't doubt the accuracy of what Perron is showing, and this is a film with many things going for it—intelligence, feeling, and lively performances, especially by Monique Lepage as Taureau's gypsy-like mother. And yet Taureau is not a film with which one gets quite fully involved. We're not drawn into it emotionally, we don't reach any psychological depths. The film is more openly bitter than Mon oncle Antoine, but less sly, less subtle and less complex. We see what Perron is getting at and we understand why, but we don't make any discoveries of our own, and we don't get inside anybody's head."

For Cinema Canada, Natalie Edwards wrote that the film was let down somewhat by Mélançon portraying Taureau as essentially a "castrated St. Bernard" rather than the avatar of raw, magnetic and dangerous sexuality that the villagers saw him as, but concluded that "Taureau is a good film, despite some awkward intercutting, protracted tensions that start to slip, and unnecessary or underdeveloped characters. It has life. It has feeling. And above all it is beautifully sensual in a pleasantly adolescent sense: lots of soft flesh, feathers, hair, breasts, taut nipples. In fact, the cruel excitement of sex permeates the film just as it does an adolescent's life."
