= Those Damned Savages =

1971 Canadian film

- French: Les maudits sauvages
- Directed by: Jean Pierre Lefebvre
- Written by: Jean Pierre Lefebvre
- Starring: Rachel Cailhier; Pierre Dufresne; Nicole Filion; Luc Granger
- Cinematography: Jean-Claude Labrecque
- Edited by: Marguerite Duparc
- Music by: Walter Boudreau
- Production company: Cinak
- Distributed by: Faroun Films
- Release date: May 1971 (Cannes)
- Running time: 116 minutes
- Country: Canada
- Language: French

Those Damned Savages (French: Les maudits sauvages) is a Canadian drama film, directed by Jean Pierre Lefebvre and released in 1971. A satirical critique of colonialism, the film explores its thesis that racist attitudes toward First Nations have not changed through a narrative that places various real historical figures from the 17th century in modern-day Montreal.

The film stars Rachel Cailhier as Tékacouita, a young Mohawk woman in New France who is taken to the city by coureur de bois Thomas Hébert (Pierre Dufresne) to work as a domestic servant, after being forcibly separated from her fiancé. In Montreal, Thomas forces Tékacouita to work as a go-go dancer in a nightclub, where she repeatedly deals with attempted sexual assault and other modern problems until her fiancé arrives to save her.

The film's cast also includes Nicole Filion as Jeanne Mance, Luc Granger as abbé Frelaté and Marcel Sabourin as Jean Talon.

The film premiered in the Directors' Fortnight program at the 1971 Cannes Film Festival.
