= Weapons and Men =

1973 Canadian film directed by André Melançon

- French: Des armes et des hommes
- Directed by: André Melançon
- Written by: André Melançon
- Produced by: Jean-Marc Garand
- Starring: Marcel Sabourin
- Cinematography: Georges Dufaux; Pierre Mignot
- Edited by: Josée Lecours
- Production company: National Film Board of Canada
- Release date: 1973
- Running time: 58 minutes
- Country: Canada
- Language: French

Weapons and Men (French: Des armes et les hommes) is a Canadian midlength docudrama film, directed by André Melançon and released in 1973. An examination of humanity's relationship with guns, the film blends dramatized scenes of gun crime and interviews with military personnel, police officers, criminals and gun collectors.

The cast includes André Cartier, Gilbert Dupuis, Michel Forget, J.-Léo Gagnon, Pierre Hébert, Suzanne Kay, Robert Leclerc, Yves Massicotte, Michel Ouimet, Sidney Pearson, Sylvie Perron and Marcel Sabourin.

The film won two Canadian Film Awards at the 25th Canadian Film Awards in 1973, for Best Actor, Non-Feature (Sabourin) and Best Non-Dramatic Script (Melançon).
