= Robert Daudelin =

Canadian film administrator and historian

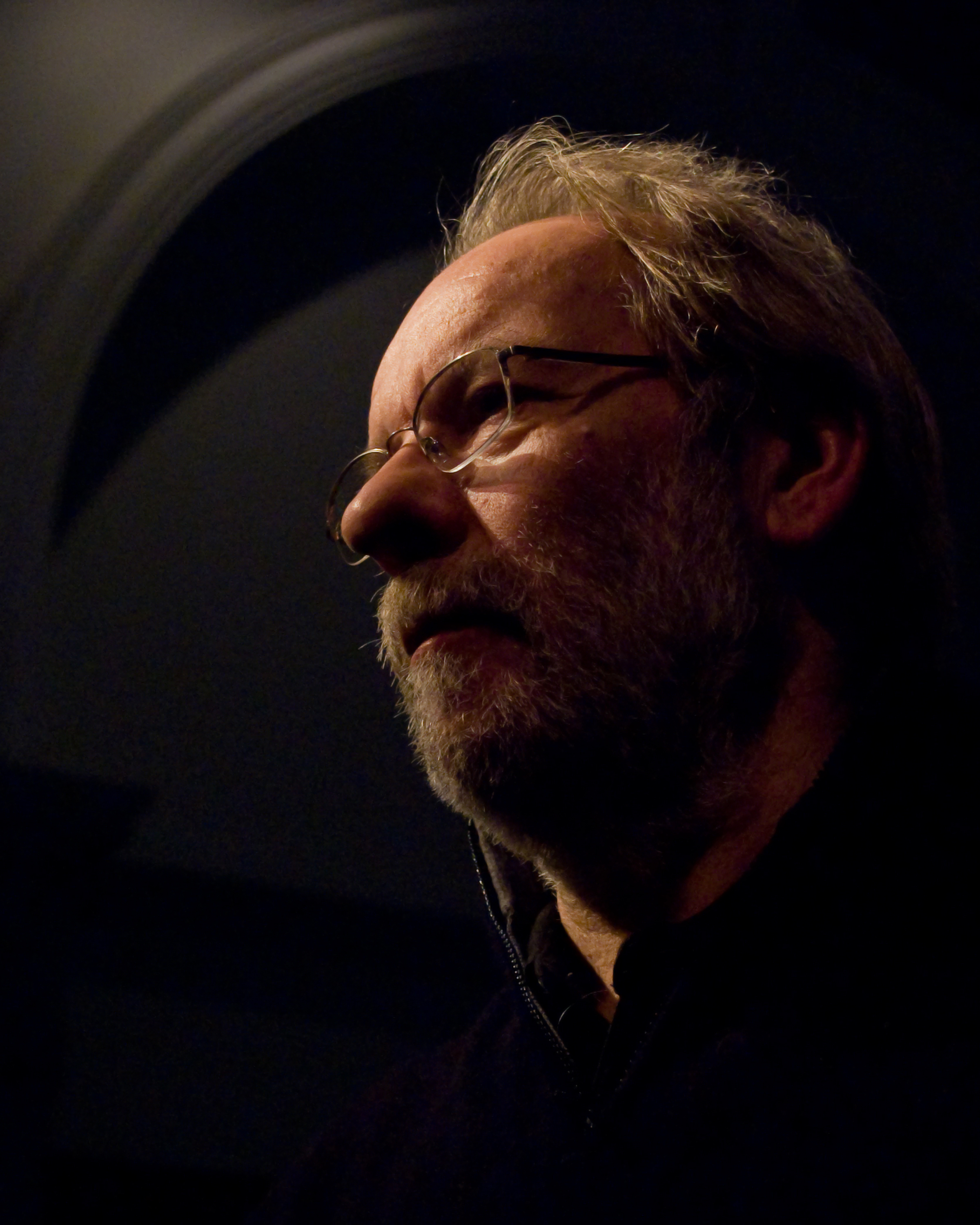
Robert Daudelin

Robert Daudelin (born May 31, 1939, in Bromont, Quebec) is a Canadian film administrator and historian, best known as the longtime director of the Cinémathèque québécoise.

He was a founder of the Quebec film magazine Objectif, a programmer for the Montreal International Film Festival, and the first director of the Conseil québécois pour la diffusion du cinéma, and has served on the board of the International Federation of Film Archives. In 1987, he made Konitz: Portrait of the Artist as a Saxophonist, a documentary film about jazz musician Lee Konitz, for the National Film Board.

He received Quebec's Prix Albert-Tessier for contributions to Quebec cinema in 2002, a Special Achievement Genie in 2003, and was named as a Member of the Order of Canada in 2004.
