= Michèle Magny =

Canadian actress, playwright and theatre director (1944–2026)

- Born: 1944
- Died: 17 October 2026 (aged 82)
- Occupations: Actress, playwright, theatre director

Michèle Magny (1944 – 17 October 2026) was a Canadian actress, playwright and theatre director from Montreal, Quebec. She was a Governor General's Award nominee for French-language drama at the 1995 Governor General's Awards, for her play Marina, le dernier rose aux joues.

== Life and career ==
A 1968 graduate of the National Theatre School of Canada, she began her career with roles in films such as Don't Let the Angels Fall and The House of Light (La Chambre blanche). Her other credits have included the films O or the Invisible Infant (Ô ou l'invisible enfant), Taureau, La Piastre, The Disappearance, The Machine Age (L'Âge de la machine), To Be Sixteen (Avoir 16 ans) and Wild Flowers (Les Fleurs sauvages), and the television series Mont-Joye, Maigrichon et Gras-Double and La Bonne Aventure.

More prominent as a stage actress, her performances included productions of the collective play La Nef des sorcières, Michel Tremblay's Bonjour, là, bonjour, Anne Legault's O'Neill, Denise Boucher's Les Fées ont soif, and a French translation of Tom Stoppard's The Real Thing. She has directed productions of Jacques Rampal's Célimène et le cardinal, Jovette Marchessault's Anaïs dans la queue de la comète, Sam Shepard's Fool for Love, Edward Albee's Who's Afraid of Virginia Woolf?, and Elliott Hayes's Homeward Bound.

Her second stage play, Un carré de ciel (2004), portrayed the life of writer Jacques Ferron. She also wrote two radio plays for Ici Radio-Canada Première, La plume et le scalpel and Histoire de gare et d'amour.

Magny died on 17 October 2026, at the age of 82.
