= L'Infonie =

- Origin: Montreal, Quebec, Canada
- Genres: Jazz fusion; avant-garde; free improvisation; chamber jazz
- Years active: 1967–1974
- Past members: Walter Boudreau; Raôul Duguay; Jacques Beaudoin; Jean Grimard; Jean Préfontaine; Michel Lefrançois; Pierre Daigneault; Ysengourd Knörh; Yves Charbonneau; Jack Rider

L'Infonie was an avant-garde Québécois chamber ensemble founded in Montreal in 1967, under the direction of classical composer Walter Boudreau and artist/poet Raôul Duguay. The name is derived from a pun for the French words for "symphony" and "the Inferno". They produced four albums between 1969 and 1974, after which the project ended. It was intended both as a commercial music group and a novel approach to collective improvisation. L'Infonie had as many as thirty full-time musicians during its artistic apex.

Duguay published the group's manifesto in 1970. They released a number of albums on the avant-garde side of Quebec's progressive rock and jazz-rock scenes, blending disparate genres like classical, jazz, rock and electronica, proving to be influential in Montreal's political counterculture in the early 1970s until its 1974 dissolution. Their albums have since become sought-out collector's items. The ensemble's third album, Vol. 333, was re-released on vinyl in 2016 by Montreal label Mucho Gusto.

== Unfinished Infonie ==
Unfinished Infonie (L'Infonie inachevée...), a 1973 documentary film by Roger Frappier about the ensemble, won the Canadian Film Award for Best Sound at the 25th Canadian Film Awards, before going into wider release in 1974.

A restored version of the film was screened as part of the 2022 Festival du nouveau cinéma's Estival program of summer repertory screenings, before going into commercial release in 2023.

== Discography ==
- 1969: Vol. 3
- 1971: Vol. 33: le Mantra
- 1972: Vol. 333
- 1974: Vol. 3333
