= The Last Betrothal =

1973 Canadian film

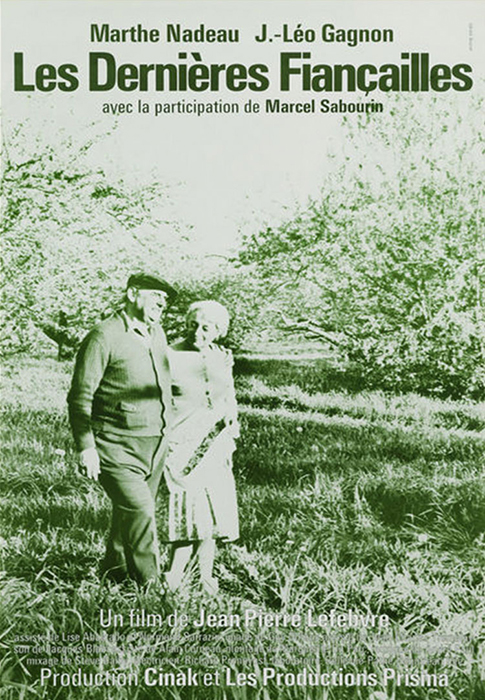
- French: Les dernières fiançailles
- Directed by: Jean Pierre Lefebvre
- Written by: Jean-Pierre Lefebvre
- Produced by: Marguerite Duparc; Bernard Lalonde
- Starring: J. Léo Gagnon; Marthe Nadeau; Marcel Sabourin
- Cinematography: Guy Dufaux
- Edited by: Marguerite Duparc
- Music by: Andrée Paul
- Production companies: Productions Prisma; Cinak
- Distributed by: Cinema Libre
- Release date: December 14, 1973
- Running time: 92 minutes
- Country: Canada
- Language: French

The Last Betrothal (French: Les dernières fiançailles) is a Canadian drama film, directed by Jean Pierre Lefebvre and released in 1973.

== Plot ==
The film stars J. Léo Gagnon and Marthe Nadeau as Armand and Rose Tremblay, an elderly couple who have been married for fifty years and are living their final days together as Armand is terminally ill; however, Rose has secretly vowed to die at the same time as Armand, so that she will never have to live without him.

== Cast ==
The cast also includes Marcel Sabourin as Armand's doctor.

== Release ==
The film opened theatrically in December 1973.

It was screened in the Directors Fortnight program at the 1974 Cannes Film Festival, and was the 1974 winner of the Prix de l'Organisation catholique internationale du cinéma for the best film on spiritual and religious themes. It was later screened at the 1984 Festival of Festivals as part of Front & Centre, a retrospective program of important films from throughout Canadian film history.
