= Pigs Are Seldom Clean =

1973 Canadian film

- French: On n'engraisse pas les cochons à l'eau claire
- Directed by: Jean Pierre Lefebvre
- Written by: Jean-Pierre Lefebvre
- Produced by: Marguerite Duparc; Claude Godbout
- Starring: Jean-René Ouellet; Louise Cuerrier; Maryse Pelletier
- Cinematography: Guy Dufaux
- Edited by: Marguerite Duparc
- Production companies: Les Productions Prisma; Cinak
- Distributed by: Disci
- Release date: November 15, 1973
- Running time: 112 minutes
- Country: Canada
- Language: French

Pigs Are Seldom Clean (French: On n'engraisse pas les cochons à l'eau claire, lit. "One Doesn't Fatten Pigs in Clean Water") is a Canadian drama film, directed by Jean Pierre Lefebvre and released in 1973. The film stars Jean-René Ouellet as Bob Tremblay, an undercover Royal Canadian Mounted Police officer in Hull, Quebec, whose fiancée Hélène is kidnapped and raped by the criminal gang he is infiltrating after his identity is discovered.

The film's cast also includes Marthe Nadeau, Maryse Pelletier, J.-Léo Gagnon, Jean-Pierre Saulnier, Louise Cuerrier and Denys Arcand.

Jay Scott of The Globe and Mail characterized the film as "Lefebvre's only melodrama, a film that could almost be a product of the new German Cinema."
