= Jacques Leduc =

Canadian film director and cinematographer

- Born: November 25, 1941 (age 84); Montreal, Quebec, Canada
- Occupations: Film director Cinematographer; Screenwriter
- Years active: 1965 - Present

Jacques Leduc (born November 25, 1941) is a Canadian film director and cinematographer.

== Biography ==
Leduc began his career in 1961 working as a film critic for the magazine Objectif. The following year, at the age of 21, he was hired as a camera assistant by the NFB. Over the course of the next few years he worked under such filmmakers as Denys Arcand, Gilles Carle, and Don Owen. In 1965 he began working as both Director and Cinematographer; his first film as director was a documentary short entitled Chantal en vrac. Leduc continued his work as Director with his first feature film in 1967 entitled Nomininque, depuis qu'il existe and his first feature documentary film in 1969 entitled Cap d'espoir. The documentary film was "about the muted violence that existed [in Quebec] and the monopoly over news held by Power Corp." and became one of the most famous cases of censorship at the NFB when it was banned by NFB commissioner Hugo McPherson.

Leduc continued working on critically acclaimed films throughout the 70s and 80s such as On est loin du soleil (1970), Tendresse ordinaire (1973), and Trois pommes à côté du sommeil (1988). In 1990 he left the NFB and became a freelance filmmaker. In 1992 he directed the film La vie fantôme; the film was named Best Canadian Film at the Montreal World Film Festival and earned a Genie Award for Best Screenplay nomination. Since then he has primarily worked with other Directors as their cinematographer and in 2008 was awarded the Prix Albert-Tessier.

== Selected filmography ==
=== Features ===
- We Are Far from the Sun (On est loin du soleil) - 1971
- Ordinary Tenderness (Tendresse ordinaire) - 1973
- The Last Glacier (Le dernier glacier) - 1984, co-directed with Roger Frappier
- Lessons on Life (Trois pommes à côté du sommeil) - 1989
- Phantom Life (La Vie fantôme) - 1992
- When I Will Be Gone (L'Âge de braise) - 1998

=== Other work ===
- Chantal en vrac - documentary short, 1966
- Nominingue... depuis qu'il existe - TV movie, 1967
- Cap d'espoir - documentary short, 1969
- Là ou ailleurs - documentary short co-directed with Pierre Bernier, 1969
- Ça marche - documentary short co-directed with Arnie Gelbart, 1969
- Je chante à cheval avec Willie Lamothe - documentary short co-directed with Lucien Ménard, 1971
- Alegria - documentary short, 1973
- Ultimatum - cinematographer, 1973
- Chronique de la vie quotidienne - 1977–1978, an anthology series of 8 films
- Albédo - documentary short co-directed with René Roy, 1982
- Les Attentes - TV movie, 1986
- Les Inquietudes de Diane - TV movie, 1986
- Notes sur l'arrière-saison - documentary short, 1986
- Le Temps des cigales - documentary short, 1987
- Charade chinoise - documentary, 1987
- Montreal Stories (Montréal vu par...) - segment "La Toile du temps" - 1991
- A Child on the Lake (L'Enfant sur le lac) - TV movie, 1992
