= Thomas Vámos =

Hungarian-Canadian cinematographer (born 1938)

- Born: September 21, 1938 (age 86); Budapest, Hungary
- Occupation: Cinematographer

Thomas Vámos (born September 21, 1938) is a Hungarian-Canadian cinematographer. He is most noted as a two-time Genie Award nominee for Best Cinematography, receiving nominations at the 10th Genie Awards in 1989 for The Revolving Doors (Les Portes tournantes) and at the 13th Genie Awards in 1992 for Being at Home with Claude.

Vámos was born in Budapest, Hungary. His other film credits have included This Is No Time for Romance (Ça n'est pas le temps des romans), Kid Sentiment, Q-Bec My Love, O.K. ... Laliberté, Mario, The Dame in Colour (La dame en couleurs), The Peanut Butter Solution, The Gate, Captive Hearts, A Hero's Life (La vie d'un héros), The Sleep Room, On Your Head (Le Ciel sur la tête) and Summer with the Ghosts.

He directed a number of films in the 1970s and 1980s, including the feature films Exile (L'Exil) and The Flower Between the Teeth (La fleur aux dents). In 1983 the short film The Plant (La plante), which Vámos codirected with Joyce Borenstein, won the Montreal Prize at the Montreal World Film Festival.
