= Raôul Duguay =

Canadian musician and politician (born 1939)

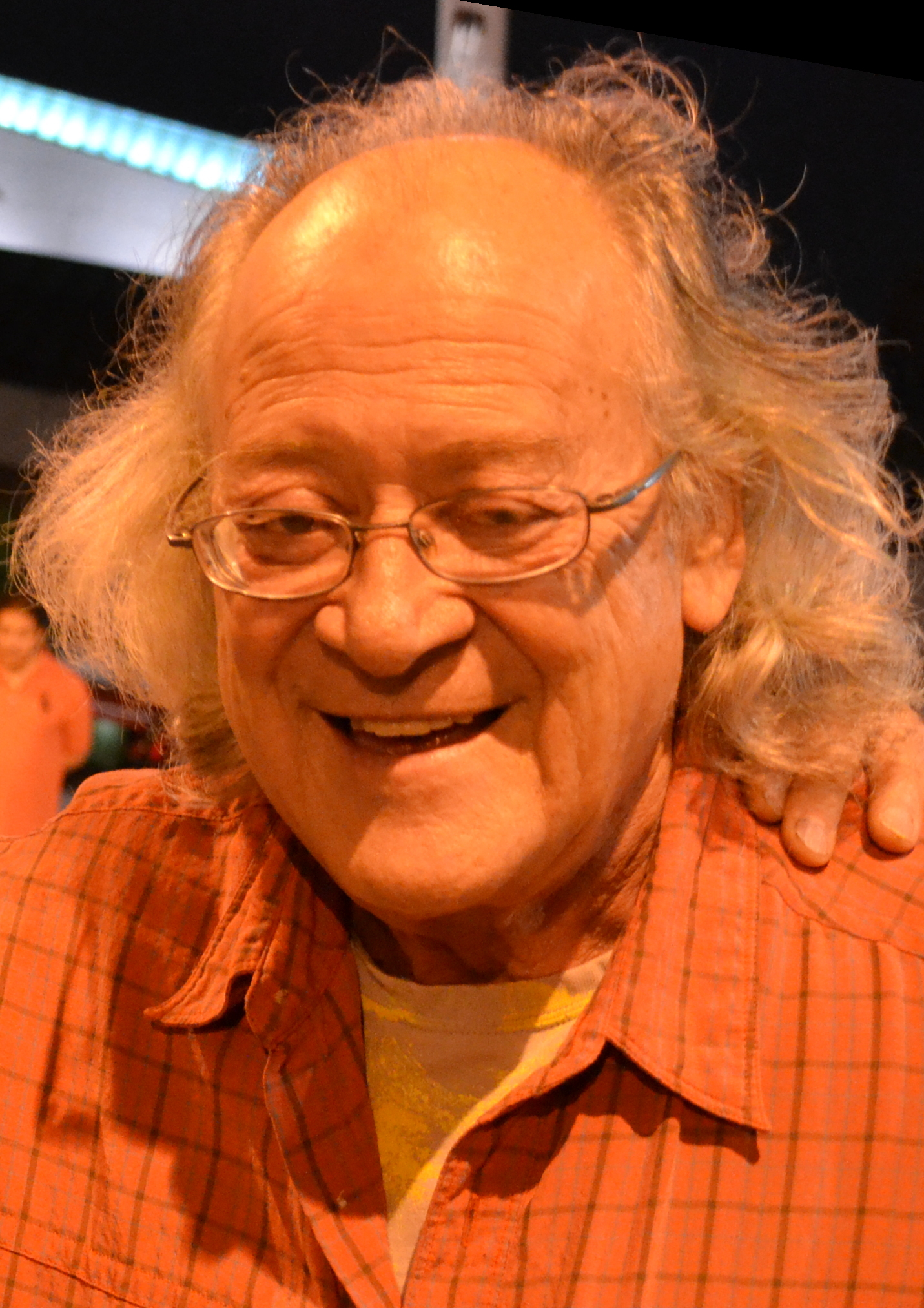

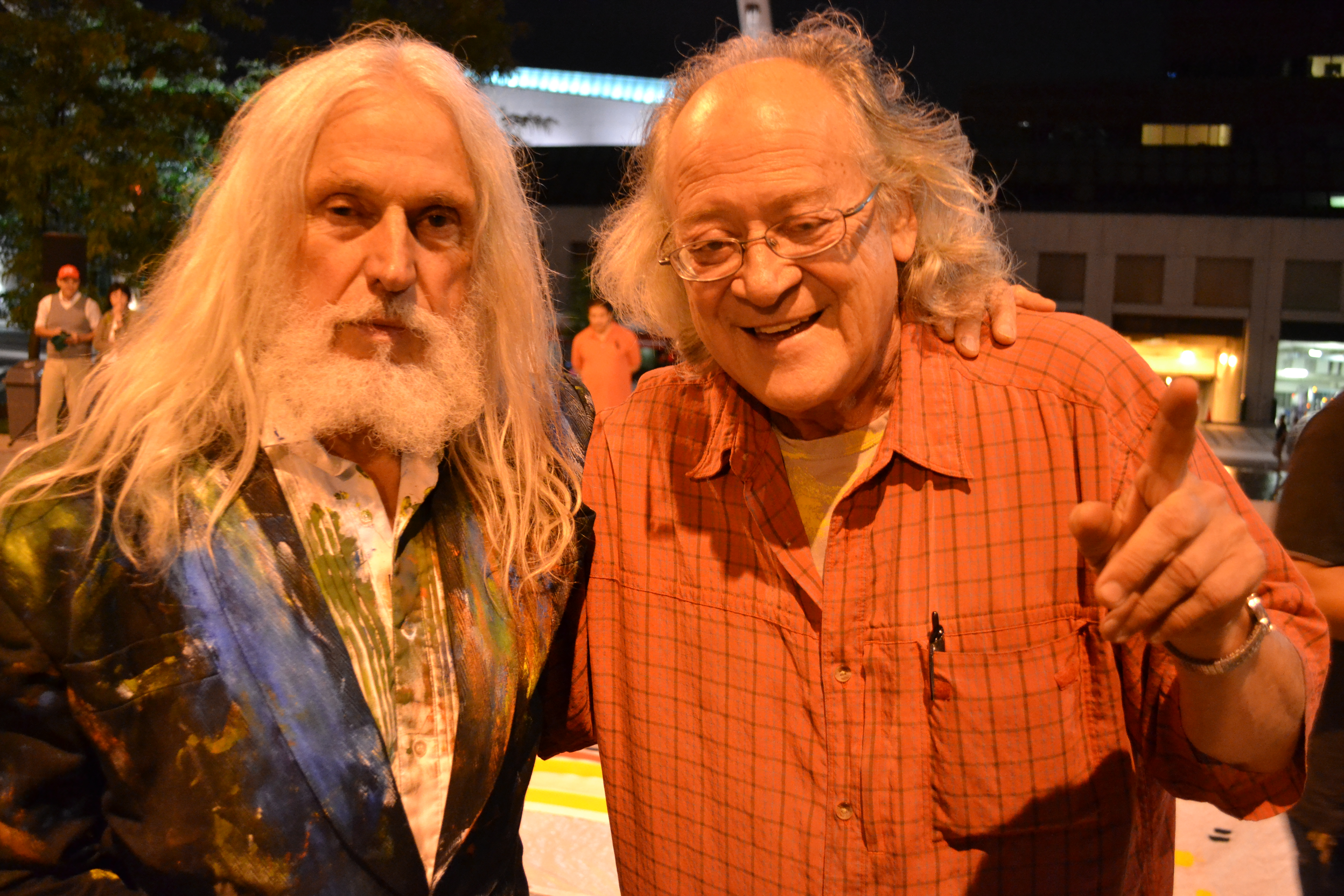
Public performance of Armand Vaillancourt at their show "On n'a pas de printemps à perdre". Quartier des Spectacles of Montreal, at the corner of Balmoral and Mayor streets. He is with Raôul Duguay.

Raôul Duguay (born February 13, 1939) is a Canadian artist, poet, musician, and political activist in the province of Quebec, Canada. He has been an active performer since 1966. Duguay is a longtime supporter of the Quebec sovereignty movement and has run for public office on at least two occasions.

== Artist ==
Duguay was born in Val-d'Or in the Abitibi-Témiscamingue region of Quebec, an event that he later chronicled on the semi-autobiographical track "La bittt à Tibi" on his first album. He began writing poetry in the 1950s, and his first two anthologies were published in 1966 and 1967.

He met Walter Boudreau in 1967, and the two artists formed L'Infonie shortly thereafter. This project was intended both as a music group and a new approach to collective improvisation; Duguay published its manifesto in 1970. The group released a number of albums on the avant-garde side of Quebec's progressive rock and jazz-rock scenes before dissolving in 1973. Boudreau and Duguay have re-united on occasion since then, including in 2007 for an Orgues et Couleurs festival.

Duguay released his first solo album in 1975, entitled Alllô tôulmônd; this album features "Tôuttt etô bôuttt," one of his best known tracks. The following year, he performed in front of 400,000 people at the province's Fête nationale, an annual Quebec nationalist cultural event. Duguay released several more solo albums in the seventies, eighties, and nineties; after a gap of eleven years, he returned with J'ai soif in 2010. His song "La bittt à Tibi" was inducted into the Canadian Songwriters Hall of Fame in 2008.

Duguay also provided the music for the film Wild Flowers (Les fleurs sauvages) (1982), for which he received a Genie nomination. In 1984, he took part in a musical collaboration with Parti Québécois legislator Gilles Baril. In 1996, he provided the text for a revised version of Terry Riley's In C.

Duguay has continued to publish works of poetry. His sixteenth volume, entre la lettre et l'esprit, was issued in 2001. He has also worked in the visual arts as a painter and sculptor.

== Politics ==
Duguay is a longtime supporter of the Quebec sovereignty movement. In his poem Trente Lettres (1995), he described Canada as a father who "never gave mother [Quebec] an orgasm." In 2010, he signed a public letter criticizing the organizers of Quebec City's Festival d'été for booking mostly anglophone acts to perform.

Duguay ran for the House of Commons of Canada in the 1972 federal election as a non-affiliated candidate in Longueuil, under the name "Raôul Wéziwézô Duguay." He finished well behind Liberal candidate Jacques Olivier. In the 1998 provincial election, he ran as a candidate of the governing Parti Québécois in Brome-Missisquoi. He finished second to Liberal incumbent Pierre Paradis.

== Discography ==
=== With L'Infonie ===
- 1969 : L'Infonie Vol. 3 - Kotaï, London Records
- 1971 : Vol. 33 : le Mantra - Kotaï, London Records
- 1972 : L’Infonie Vol. 333 - Kotaï, London Records
- 1974 : L'infonie Vol. 3333 - Kotaï, London Records

=== Solo ===
- Alllô Tôulmônd, 1975
- L'Envol, 1976
- M, 1977
- Vivant Avec Tôulllmônd, 1978
- Lettre à Tôulllmônd, 1980
- Le Chanteur de pomme, 1982
- Tout ce qui compte, 1983
- Douceur, 1985
- Monter en amour, 1993
- Caser, 1999
- J'ai soif, 2010

=== Compilations ===
- 1979 : Ôn S'm Ô Kébèk
- 1992 : Monter En Amour

=== Collaborations ===
- 1975 : Les Porches by Maneige - Vocals and trumpet on the title song
- 1986 : Paix Sans Frontière - Raôul gave one of his songs L'oiseau pour la paix
- 1989 : Nova - with Michel Robidoux
- 1992 : Atlantide / Golgot(h)a - With Michel-Georges Brégent and Walter Boudreau - Raôul on : Golgot(h)a with Walter Boudreau
- 1999 : La santé par le rire - by Jean Drouin
- 2000 : In C - by Terry Riley - With Michel-Georges Brégent and Walter Boudreau - Raôul vocals on the title song In C
- 2006 : Septentrion - by Anodajay - Raôul vocals on Le Beat À Ti-Bi

== Legacy ==
His name appears among the friendships of Arcimboldi in Woes of The True Policeman by Roberto Bolaño.

== Electoral record ==
1998 Quebec general election: Brome-Missisquoi
Party	Candidate	Votes	%	±%
Liberal	Pierre Paradis	18,127	57.17	−3.95
Parti Québécois	Raôul Duguay	9,789	30.87	+1.07
Action démocratique	Eric Larivière	3,599	11.35	+4.58
Natural Law	Jean-Charles Rouleau	194	0.61	−0.30
Total valid votes		31,709	100.00%	
Total rejected ballots		258	0.82%	
Turnout		31,967	80.56	-3.51
Eligible voters		39,680		
Source: Official Results, Le Directeur général des élections du Québec.

1972 Canadian federal election: Longueuil
Party	Candidate	Votes	%	±%
Liberal	Jacques Olivier	22,129	44.62	
Social Credit	Emile-A. Vadeboncoeur	12,091	24.38	
Progressive Conservative	Marcel Robidas	7,015	14.14	
New Democratic	Robert Mansour	4,548	9.17	
Independent	Jacques Gendron	2,020	4.07	
Non-Affiliated	Raôul Wéziwézô Duguay	1,625	3.28	
Marxist–Leninist	André Pesant	170	0.34	
Total valid votes		49,598	100.00	
Total rejected ballots		2,977		
Turnout		52,575	72.56	
Electors on the lists		72,458		
Source: Official Voting Results, Office of the Chief Electoral Officer (Canada), 1972.

== Bibliography ==
- Raôul Duguay et al., Raôul Duguay ou : le poète à la voix d'ô, Montréal, L'Aurore, 1979.
