= Compagnons de Saint-Laurent =

Canadian theatre company

Les Compagnons de Saint-Laurent was a Quebec theatre company that was founded in 1937 and dissolved in 1951. According to The Canadian Encyclopedia, it was the "most influential theatrical company in the history of Québec".

== History ==
The company was founded in August 1937 at Collège de Saint-Laurent in Saint-Laurent, Quebec, by Émile Legault, Roger Varin, and Léonide Lavinge. Productions were initially religious in nature. The troupe also produced a magazine entitled Les Cahiers des Compagnons. In 1947, Les Compagnons de Saint-Laurent were awarded the Trophée Bessborough at a festival in London, Ontario.

== Notable actors ==
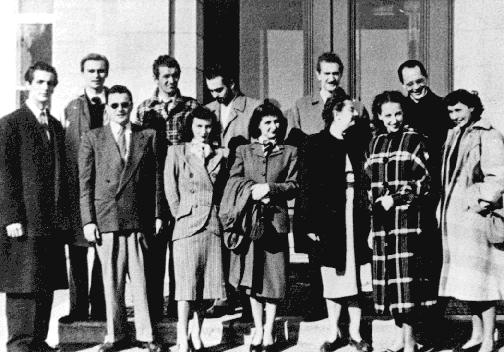
Actors in the troupe in 1944

- Pierre Dagenais
- Jean-Louis Roux
- Jean Gascon
- Georges Groulx
- Guy Provost
- Denise Pelletier
- Gilles Pelletier
- Hélène Loiselle
- Jean Coutu
- Guy Mauffette
- Félix Leclerc
- Lucille Cousineau
- Denise Vachon
- Thérèse Cadorette
- Jean Duceppe
- Lionel Villeneuve
- Jacques Létourneau
- Gabriel Gascon
- Charlotte Boisjoli
- Jean-Pierre Masson

== Legacy ==
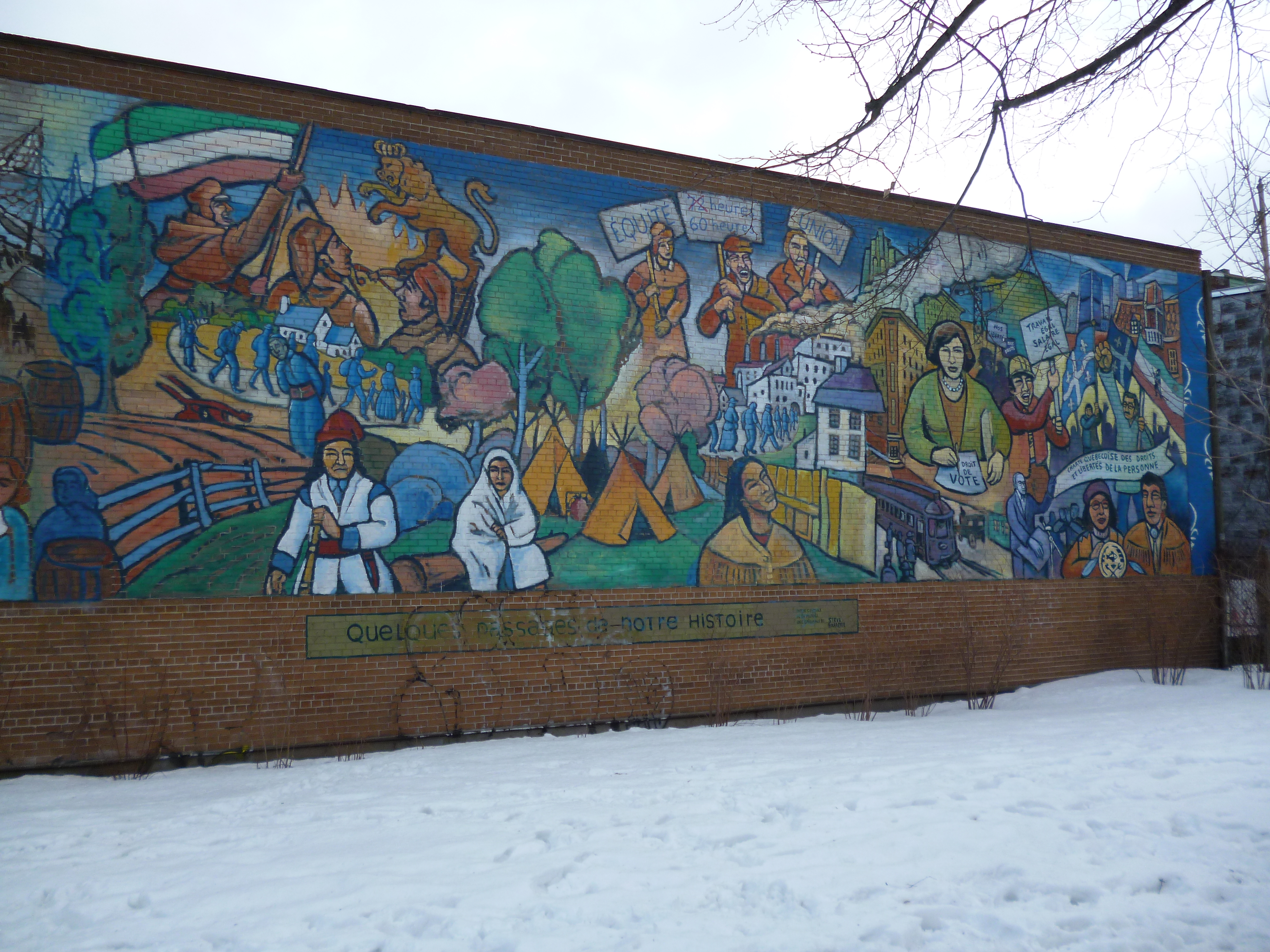
A wall at the Parc des Compagnons de Saint-Laurent

In 1996, a park was named after the theatre company. A former boarding school was demolished when the park was being established. It is located on 4375 Cartier Street. In 1997, Jean-Claude Labrecque directed the film L'Adventure des Compagnons de Saint-Laurent, a documentary about the history and impact of the company and the work of Émile Legault. The film was produced by the National Film Board of Canada and Verseau International.

== See also ==
- Théâtre du Rideau Vert
- Théâtre du Nouveau Monde

== Sources ==
- Jasmin-Bélisle, Hélène (1986). Le pere Émile Legault et ses compagnons de saint Laurent: une petite histoire. Leméac. ISBN 2-7609-5067-0.
