= Robert Prévost =

Robert Prevost (born 1955) is the birth name of Pope Leo XIV, head of the Catholic Church and sovereign of Vatican City State since 2025.

Robert Prevost or Prévost may also refer to:

- Robert Prévost (set designer) (1927–1982), Canadian set designer
- Robert Prévost (historian) (1918–2007), Canadian historian, writer and journalist from Quebec
- Robert Prévost (painter) (1893–1967), French painter
- Robert W. Prevost (born 1955), American philosopher
