= Robert Prévost (set designer) =

Canadian set designer (1927–1982)

- Born: March 21, 1927; Montreal, Quebec, Canada
- Died: July 5, 1982 (aged 55)
- Occupation: Set designer

Robert Prévost OC (March 21, 1927 – July 5, 1982) was a Canadian set designer.

Born in 1927 in the Rosemont district of Montreal, Prévost completed his classical studies at the Collège Sainte-Croix, on Sherbrooke Street in Montreal. At the beginning of his career, he became a member of the Compagnons de Saint-Laurent, a theatre troupe created and directed by Father Émile Legault. There, he met great figures of Montreal theatre, including Jean-Louis Roux, Jean Gascon, and Georges Groulx. He joined the Théâtre du Nouveau Monde in 1953 for which he created more than 75 sets: Tartuffe, Dom Juan, Le Maître de Santiago and especially Le Malade imaginaire which was acclaimed in America and Europe. He designed sets for Canada's major stage productions, including the Stratford Festival, Les Grands Ballets Canadiens and the Royal Winnipeg Ballet.

In 1972, he was made a Member of the Order of Canada and was promoted to Officer in 1978.
