= Denise Pelletier =

Canadian actress

Denise Pelletier OC
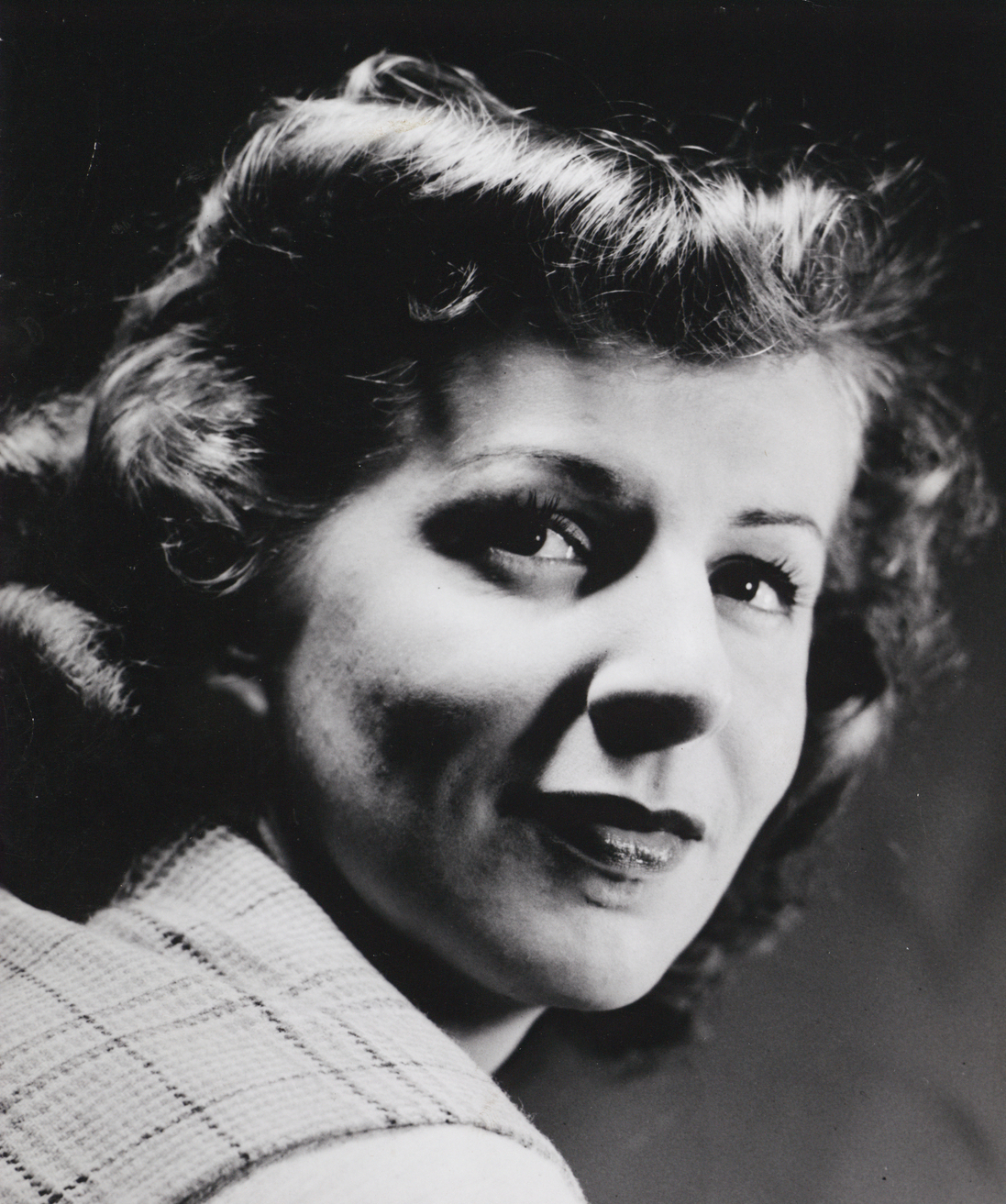
- The young Denise Pelletier, in 1946
- Born: May 22, 1923; Saint-Jovite, Quebec, Canada
- Died: May 24, 1976 (aged 53)
- Occupation: Actress
- Years active: 1943-1975

Denise Pelletier, OC (May 22, 1923 – May 24, 1976) was a Canadian actress.

== Early life ==
Pelletier was born in 1923 in Saint-Jovite, Quebec to Albert Pelletier, a literary critic, and Marie-Reine Vaugeois. She had a brother, Gilles Pelletier, who was also an actor. She attended Congrégation Notre-Dame. After leaving school, Pelletier noticed an advertisement for acting courses offered by the Montreal Repertory Theatre, enrolled and was quickly given a part. At the theatre she performed in various classical plays, and also performed in some radio soap operas.

== Film and television career ==
In 1943, Pelletier appeared in one of the first Québécois films, À la croisée des chemins. One of the few Canadian actors at the time performing in both English and French, she continued to wow audiences with titles such as the 1947 production of Les Parents terribles. In 1951 Pelletier met Jean Gascon at Théâtre du Nouveau Monde, who would go on to receive the Order of Canada. In 1952, television arrived in Canada and Pelletier jumped on the bandwagon, appearing in one of her most famous roles as Cécile in Les Plouffes.

Although she preferred the stage, Pelletier was crowned 'Miss Radio Television' in 1955 and starred opposite Jean Duceppe in De Neuf à Cinq in 1968. During the 1970s she also played in Mont-Joye and Michel Tremblay's Trois Petits Tours. In 1970, she was awarded the Order of Canada and performed in the Stratford Festival's show The Divine Sarah as her last performance in 1975.

Before the play could be performed in Montreal, Pelletier died during a heart operation on May 24, 1976, two days after her 53rd birthday.

== Legacy ==
To celebrate her legacy, the Quebec government created the Prix Denise-Pelletier.
