= Amulette Garneau =

Canadian actress

Amulette Garneau (August 11, 1928 – November 7, 2008) was a Canadian actress living in Quebec.

She was born Huguette Laurendeau in Montreal and was educated at the École des beaux-arts de Montréal, going on to study acting at the school of the Théâtre du Nouveau Monde and dramatic art with Uta Hagen in New York City. Garneau also studied with Georges Groulx.

Garneau performed with various theatre companies, including the Montreal Repertory Theatre and the Théâtre de Quat'Sous. She also became one of Michel Tremblay's favourite performers; she appeared in a number of his productions for the stage as well as the film Once Upon a Time in the East. She appeared in a number of television series, including 14, rue de Galais, La Pension Velder, La famille Plouffe and Grand-Papa. She performed with Olivier Guimond in the popular sitcom Cré Basile.

Garneau was nominated for a Genie Award for her role in the film Maria Chapdelaine. She also gave notable performances in Taureau, Night Zoo (Un zoo la nuit), Orders (Les Ordres), The Vultures (Les Vautours) and The Years of Dreams and Revolt (Les Années de rêves).

She was married twice: first to poet Sylvain Garneau in 1953 and then to Jacques Zouvi. Her son Alain Zouvi is an actor.

Her brother Marc Laurendeau is a journalist.

Garneau died in Montreal at the age of 80 from cancer.
