= Prix Denise-Pelletier =

- Awarded for: Excellence in the performing arts
- Country: Canada
- Presented by: Government of Quebec
- First award: 1977
- Most recent winner: Chloé Sainte-Marie
- Website: https://prixduquebec.gouv.qc.ca/prix/culturels/denise-pelletier/

The Prix Denise-Pelletier is an award by the Government of Quebec that is part of the Prix du Québec, given to individuals for an outstanding career in the performing arts. It is awarded to a creator, performer, stage-craftsman or person who has made a noteworthy contribution in the fields of song, music, classical singing, theatre and dance. It is named in honour of Denise Pelletier.

== Winners ==
- 1977: Félix Leclerc
- 1978: Bernard Lagacé
- 1979: Jean Duceppe
- 1980: Ludmilla Chiriaeff
- 1981: Jean Papineau-Couture
- 1982: Lionel Daunais
- 1983: Gilles Vigneault
- 1984: Fernand Nault
- 1985: Jean Gascon
- 1986: Colette Boky
- 1987: Jean-Louis Roux
- 1988: John Newmark
- 1989: Jeanne Renaud
- 1990: Joseph Rouleau
- 1991: Gilles Tremblay
- 1992: Vincent Warren
- 1993: Monique Mercure
- 1994: Martine Époque
- 1995: Walter Joachim
- 1996: François Morel
- 1997: Raymond Lévesque
- 1998: Gilles Pelletier
- 1999: Jean-Pierre Ronfard
- 2000: André Brassard
- 2001: Paul Buissonneau
- 2002: Édouard Lock
- 2003: Robert Lepage
- 2004: Walter Boudreau
- 2005: Clémence DesRochers
- 2006: Hélène Loiselle
- 2007: Paul Hébert
- 2008: Anik Bissonnette
- 2009: Roland Lepage
- 2010: Marie Chouinard
- 2011: Yannick Nézet-Séguin
- 2012: Leonard Cohen
- 2013: Monique Leyrac
- 2014: Denis Marleau
- 2015: Marie-Hélène Falcon
- 2016: Lorraine Vaillancourt
- 2017: Louise Lecavalier
- 2018: Diane Dufresne
- 2019: Angèle Dubeau
- 2020: Yvon Deschamps
- 2021: Michel Rivard
- 2022: Charles Richard-Hamelin
- 2023: Marie Tifo
- 2024: Rémy Girard
- 2025: Chloé Sainte-Marie
