= The Vultures (1975 film) =

- French: Les Vautours
- Directed by: Jean-Claude Labrecque
- Written by: Jean-Claude Labrecque; Jacques Jacob; Robert Gurik
- Produced by: Louise Ranger
- Starring: Gilbert Sicotte; Jean Duceppe; Monique Mercure
- Cinematography: Alain Dostie
- Edited by: Jean-Claude Labrecque
- Music by: Dominique Tremblay
- Distributed by: Ciné-Art
- Release date: March 3, 1975
- Running time: 91 minutes
- Country: Canada
- Language: French

The Vultures (French: Les Vautours) is a Canadian drama film, directed by Jean-Claude Labrecque and released in 1975. Set in 1959 at the end of the Maurice Duplessis era in Quebec politics, the film centres on Louis Pelletier (Gilbert Sicotte), a young man whose mother has just died, and who is coping with a trio of aunts who are much more interested in what they stand to inherit from their sister's estate than in supporting their nephew.

Labrecque released a sequel film, The Years of Dreams and Revolt (Les Années de rêves), in 1984.

== Cast ==
- Gilbert Sicotte as Louis Pelletier
- Jean Duceppe as Maurice Duplessis, Premier Ministre du Québec
- Monique Mercure as Tante Yvette Laflamme
- Carmen Tremblay as Tante Marie Roberge
- Amulette Garneau as Tante Adèle McKenzie
- Jean Mathieu as Oncle John McKenzie
- Denise Proulx as Sœur Ste-Germaine
- Paule Baillargeon as Sœur Ste-Gabrielle
- Roger Lebel as Armand Bouchard, député de Limoilou
- Anne-Marie Provencher as Claudette, la jeune voisine
- Rita Lafontaine as Madame Sansfaçon, une voisine
- Raymond Cloutier as Monsieur Sansfaçon, un voisin
- Nicole Leblanc as Une voisine
- Robert Gravel as Jeune séminariste, ancien ami de Louis
- Guy L'Écuyer as Joseph Bériault, le croque-mort
- Gabriel Arcand as Assistant du croque-mort
- Gilles Pelletier as Docteur Loiselle
- Philippe Robert as Le curé
- Georges Groulx as Le notaire
- Yolande Roy as Alda Pelletier, la mère de Louis
- Jacques Bilodeau as Rôle inconnu
