= Saskatchewan Indian Women's Association =

The Saskatchewan Indian Women's Association (SIWA) was a provincial organization representing the personal and political voices of treaty Indian women living on reserve in Saskatchewan.

Founded in 1971, it operated independently for over 35 years. SIWA was founded with the collective goal of reestablishing women's traditional roles and responsibilities in First Nations governance systems, as well as within their families and communities. SIWA developed grassroots programs aimed toward improving the living conditions for on-reserve First Nations families and children, as well as created a provincial-level presence in Indigenous women's political activism.

== History and presidents ==
SIWA was founded in 1971 after Flora Mike, a member of Beardy's and Okemasis’ First Nation, attended the National Indian Women's conference in Edmonton, Alberta. Returning home to Saskatchewan, Mike joined with other on-reserve status Indian women around common challenges they faced within their communities as well as on the provincial political level. The Saskatchewan Indian Women's Association was formed. Mike suggested that SIWA join forces with the highly recognized yet male-dominated Federation of Saskatchewan Indians (FSI; now called the Federation of Sovereign Indigenous Nations, FSIN). The pioneers of SIWA were divided over whether or not to join the FSI, as many mainstream male-dominated Indigenous political organizations had adopted patriarchal structures that failed to reflect the specific needs and concerns of Indigenous women, which inspired many Indigenous groups, including SIWA, to organize along gendered lines.

Irene Tootoosis was the first president of SIWA in 1971 followed by Isabelle McNab in 1972. Originally from the Muscowpetung First Nation, McNab married into the George Gordon First Nation in the Treaty 4 area of Touchwood Hills, Saskatchewan. McNab completed a teacher's aide course at the University of Saskatoon. Coming from a long line of leaders, McNab's father, Chief John Gambler, was an influential advocate for Saskatchewan treaty rights and leader of the Protective Association for Indians and their Treaties (PAIT) in the 1940s. McNab was also the granddaughter of "The Gambler", a well-known name involved with Treaty 4 negotiations in 1874.

SIWA experienced a two-year lapse in its operations and was revived in 1979 with Sadie Cote as its elected president. Cote was born to John Friday and Rosie Pratt on January 17, 1934, one of thirteen children. As a member of the Cote First Nation, she attended the Cote Day School until grade 10, the highest level of education offered at the school. Cote married Antoine "Tony" Cote on January 22, 1953, and together they had nine of their own children while fostering many others. Cote attended the University of Saskatoon where she earned a teaching certificate, teaching at the Cote School kindergarten for 12 years as well as earning a nursing certificate, working as a midwife, girls supervisor and seamstress in Northern Alberta. As the first child care worker in Cote, she developed the first child care program of its kind in any of the First Nations communities in Saskatchewan. To fund the child care program, Cote successfully negotiated and wrote a proposal to the federal government. She worked as an addictions counselor at the CAP center and in her later years was a community elder. Cote died at the Kamsack hospital on April 20, 2019.

== Women's life on reserve ==
Before European contact, First Nations communities in Saskatchewan were diverse, each having their own political and social structures in place. Many communities operated as matriarchal and matrilineal societies where First Nations women held egalitarian status, their roles and responsibilities recognized as vital and essential to the well-being of their people. Many First Nations women held positions of both social and political power within their communities.

European colonization imposed a patriarchal system of governance upon First Nations communities through Christian ideology and the implementation of Eurocentric law based on the goal of assimilating First Nations people into European society. The general attitude of the plains settler population towards First Nations peoples was one of racism and negative stereotypes. First Nations women experienced the intersectional oppressions of racism, sexism and colonialism in their everyday lives.

Beginning with the Indian Act of 1867, First Nation communities that signed treaties with the federal government, accepted reserve land or government payments, experienced increasing state control over their traditional political practices. Women were forbidden from treaty negotiations as colonial governments refused to negotiate with women. Women were disempowered when the male-dominated system of band politics replaced traditional clan systems, making it illegal for women to vote or participate in community decision making. By erasing all female representation in the band council system, the Indian Act created a system of political representation that failed to take women's knowledge or experience into account in any significant way.

Amendments to the Indian Act in 1880 represent a gendered form of colonialism. First Nations women lost their Indian status if they married a non-status Indian, as did their children. However, if a non-status woman married a status Indian man, not only did she become status Indian, her children would as well. This legislation was sexist in its disempowerment of status Indian women marrying outside of the band, and many First Nations women struggled against these laws that disenfranchised them from their traditional lives while simultaneously replacing them with white women.

The 1884 amendments to the Indian Act created the residential school system, awarding government and church officials the power to remove Indian children from their homes.

Amendments to the Indian Act in 1951 granted Indian women the right to vote in band elections but did not rectify their loss of status if marrying a non-status or non-treaty Indian. Beginning in the 1950s and peaking in the 1960s and 1970s, First Nations children were removed from their families by government social workers in a period referred to as the "Sixties Scoop". Many Indigenous people viewed the provincial and federal child welfare system as a replacement tactic for the gradual closure of residential schools, another attempt at assimilation of Indian peoples through the separation of First Nations children from their languages, cultures, families and communities.

The 1969 "White Paper" was an attempt made by the federal government to abolish the Indian Act and therefore Indian status, erasing all historical treaties made with the First Nations people. The federal government sought to give its control over Indigenous peoples to provincial governments. The White Paper caused a fury of protest amongst many First Nations people who saw this as a final attempt at assimilation, resulting in numerous court cases, increased academia amongst First nations peoples and a revived energy in First Nations activism. Many First Nations organizations operating at band- or community-level politics began focusing on strengthening their influence in provincial and national realms.

"Third World" living conditions existed on Saskatchewan reserves in the 1960s and 1970s. After being displaced from their lands and forced onto reserves into sub-standard housing, deteriorating reserve conditions were blamed on Indigenous women, with settler society using them as scapegoats to deflect responsibility from broken government promises and lack of government aid. "Uncivilized mothering practices" were blamed for high infant mortality and tuberculosis rates (caused by crowded living conditions) on reserve and used as justification for the removal of children from their homes. Deaths resulting from violence, poor education and poor employment outcomes were all significantly more prevalent on-reserve than in non-Indigenous society. Many communities did not have running water (less than 4%) nor indoor toilets (less than 2%).

== Vision ==
The first meeting of SIWA was held in Prince Albert, Saskatchewan, on September 1, 1971. The goals of the organization focused on four main points: "to help women organize; to prevent young people from drug and alcohol misuse; to stop juvenile delinquency on reserves; and to promote the importance of education to on-reserve families". In 1972, during McNab's first year as president, SIWA formalized its organizational structure and hired eight women from across Saskatchewan as fieldworkers. These women focused on family life within on-reserve homes, identifying issues and helping to improve living conditions. One major issue facing families was that of alcohol consumption. SIWA brought Alcoholics Anonymous into communities while actively challenging the government's proposal to legalize alcohol sales on reserve as this directly opposed First Nations peoples requests during treaty negotiations.

SIWA believed in the power of education in helping improve the lives of families on reserve. They provided information to First Nations families regarding general health, such as nutrition and birth control, as well as information on environmental health. SIWA offered counselling services and often supported women leaving violent relationships.

Recognizing the destructiveness of negative racial stereotypes prevalent in prairie society, SIWA made deliberate efforts in its messaging and organizing to reconstruct society's image of First Nations women and mothers as strong and capable. Racist preconceptions blamed the "idle and slovenly housewife" for all of the struggles facing on-reserve families, such as high infant mortality rates, poverty and disease, justifying the historic removal of Indian children from their homes and from their "unfit" mothers. To promote First Nations women as capable and committed mothers, SIWA created an annual mother of the year award that recognized and honoured First Nations women's dedication to child-rearing and homemaking.

== Relationships ==
In addition to its grassroots activism focused on families and on-reserve communities, SIWA also sought to restore gender-balance within treaty-based First Nations governance systems that had adopted patriarchal structures as a result of colonialism and the residential school system. SIWA recognized that to increase its political legitimacy it would need to establish a formal relationship with the male-dominated, well-established FSI. Within many First Nations communities, "sovereignty issues" are often separated from "community issues", the former articulated by formal (predominantly male) leadership organizations as issues surrounding land claims, constitutional, court and government battles, while the latter tend to be articulated by informal (predominantly female) leadership as a range of issues that include violence against women and their children, alcoholism, addictions, public health needs, and culturally-based community education. Formal leadership interests tend to not only be prioritized over those of informal leadership, but oftentimes "community issues" are framed as threatening to Indigenous sovereignty. SIWA demanded recognition from FSI of First Nations women's vital role as mothers and their abilities to act in formal leadership roles. In their initial negotiations with FSI, Isabelle McNab took a conciliatory approach, insisting that SIWA's political motivations were non-threatening to the FSI's goals and that their organization wished to work alongside men, not in opposition to them. Despite their efforts to establish this relationship, FSI did not grant SIWA the support they requested and SIWA's leaders found themselves in unequal and subordinate positions in relation to male-dominated FSI throughout the 1970s.

The national organization Indian Rights for Indian Women (IRIW), led by Mary Two-Axe Early, was leading a movement to amend the Indian Act in regards to the loss of Indian women's status and treaty rights when marrying a non-status Indian, as well as to return the status of women who had historically been stripped of their rights. McNab led SIWA in its stance against the actions of IRIW, stating that amendments to the Indian Act could not proceed without direct consultation with reserve women. SIWA argued that the focus of First Nations political action must be centered on historical treaties and the rights they affirm, not on the government-imposed Indian Act. SIWA insisted that any alterations to treaty agreements must proceed with full First Nations consultation.

== Resistance ==
The struggles of IRIW and other Indigenous women's battles for gender equality (such as in Corbiere v Canada, Sandra Lovelace and the United Nations) are well documented. But the everyday struggles of Indigenous women against gendered colonialism are not as well known and are often reduced to the classification of "women's issues" by formal Indigenous male leadership who frame these issues as being a threat to Indigenous sovereignty. Groups such as the National Indian Brotherhood (now the Assembly of First Nations) took a stance against the women in Corbiere v Canada, resulting in Mary Two-Axe Early and 60 other Indigenous women making their case against gender discrimination in the international arena, only to return home and find that they had been evicted from their homes by their band councils. Other Indigenous women who have fought against the loss of their status and homes resulted in threats from their band leaders and physical violence. Further, the Native Women's Association of Canada felt that they were not being well-represented by the Assembly of First Nations and sought an independent seat for status Indian women during the 1982 constitutional amendments, which they were not awarded. It is for these historical and contemporary reasons that many Indigenous women's organizations have lost faith in the ability of formal male political leadership to represent their agendas and therefore seek representation independently.

SIWA experienced a lapse in its operations from 1977 to 1979. In 1979, under the leadership of Sadie Cote, SIWA was revived. Cote continued to seek a supportive, formal relationship with FSI but the lack of progress resulted in a shift from SIWA's initial conciliatory approach to a tone that demanded change. In the article titled, "Women Wage War" published in "Saskatchewan Indian", Cote stated, "Where are the so-called heads of the households? The so-called elected leaders of the bands?" The women of SIWA mobilized against alcohol and political apathy, calling out the inaction of male First Nations leaders to take an active role in raising future generations.

In 1980, SIWA continued to resist the sale of alcohol on reserve, voicing their concerns about alcohol's destructive effects on their families and communities. Cote spoke as a mother, sharing personal experiences of women on reserve living under the Indian Act:

"We are the mothers who have to accept and not complain about the substandard housing units, poor heating systems, and no indoor plumbing or running water. We are the mothers who have to contend with the poor health services provided to Indians at the reserve level. We are the mothers that have to walk with a sick child a number of miles in order to see a doctor."

In 2000, The Saskatchewan First Nations’ Women's Commission (SFNWC) was formed and included the members of SIWA. In February 2004, the FSIN Convention Act was amended to include the SFNWC as the seventh Commission. In June 2004, the FSIN Women's Act was ratified, and is a "...Formal piece of legislation that validates the ongoing movement of Saskatchewan First Nations’ Women".

== Awards and accomplishments ==
In its goal of protecting reserve women from violent relationships, SIWA established three women's shelters for victims of domestic violence.

Cote was highly involved with the Cote Chiefs Hockey Club, establishing a group of women volunteers on the Cote First Nations reserve that worked together in securing funding for an on-reserve minor hockey league. The women's group also successfully lead the community in building an outdoor ice rink, as well as leading construction of the first artificial ice arena in any Saskatchewan First Nations community.

Cote would go on to become the first elected woman councilor in the Cote First Nation's history. In 2004, seven women served as Chiefs of First Nations in Saskatchewan with many other women serving as band councilors.

In October 2011, at the Women of the Dawn's annual First Nations Awards banquet, Cote received the Lifetime Achievement Award. At this time, she had served as a First Nations band councilor for 17 terms and was recognized for her development of the first child care program in Cote, the first of its kind in any Saskatchewan First Nations community. She was recognized for serving four years as president of SIWA and for her contributions and dedication towards solving the health and social issues facing women and children on reserve.
