= Chantal duPont =

Canadian artist (1942–2019)

- Born: 1942; Montreal
- Died: 25 February 2019 (aged 76–77); Montreal
- Education: Montreal School of Fine Arts, Concordia University
- Awards: 2005 Bell Canada Award in Video Art from Canada Council for the Arts

Chantal duPont (1942–2019) was a multidisciplinary Canadian artist based in Montreal. She worked in multimedia, photography, painting, sculpture, graphics and writing. For much of her career, she was an associate professor at the Université du Québec à Montréal. She is remembered in particular for her award-winning video art.

== Biography ==
Chantal duPont studied at the École des beaux-arts de Montréal from 1964 to 1966. She did her master's degree at Concordia University from 1967 to 1969.

Her creative work builds on aspects of identity and memory of the body. It has been presented at many video festivals at home and abroad, earning awards in Belgium, Colombia, France and Portugal.

She frequently attended Montreal's International Festival of Films on Art. In 2007, the year after she had received the Bell Canada Award, the festival presented a retrospective of her video art contributions. In addition to her own creative work, she trained and assisted many generations of artists. She is remembered in particular for her video Du front tout le tour de la tête which in 2001 won awards in Lisbon, Clermont-Ferrand and Quebec.

Side by side with Martine Époque and Andrée Beaulieu-Green she was one of the outstanding women who contributed to digital art in the province of Quebec. In connection with her Bell Canada Award, the assessment committee noted her "stunningly beautiful works", adding "With grace and elegance, she interweaves technical precision with performance to create potent meditations on identity and memory."

Chantal duPont died on 25 February 2019 in Montreal.

== Awards ==
- 2005: Bell Canada Award in Video Art

== Collections ==
- Cinémathèque Québécoise
- Musée des beaux-arts de Sherbrooke
- Musée national des beaux-arts du Québec
