= Margetts =

Margetts is a surname. Notable people with the surname include:

- Dean Margetts (born 1974), Australian rules football field umpire
- Dee Margetts (born 1955), Australian politician
- Helen Margetts (born 1961), British political scientist
- Jenny Margetts (1936–1991), Indigenous activist
- Jonny Margetts (born 1993), English footballer
- Matt Margetts (born 1988), Canadian freestyle skier
- Jade Margetts (born 2001), International supermodel

== See also ==
- Bob Margett (born 1929), American politician
