= Lorraine Pintal =

Canadian actor and director

Lorraine Pintal OC, (born September 24, 1951) is a Canadian actor, director, producer and playwright.

== Biography ==
The daughter of Jean Pintal and Anne-Marie Bélanger, she was born in Plessisville and studied at the Conservatoire Lassalle and the Conservatoire d'art dramatique de Montréal. She debuted with the Théâtre du Nouveau Monde in 1973 in Mistero Buffo. In the same year, she was a co-founder of the Théâtre de La Rallonge. Pintal directed a number of works for the Théâtre du Nouveau Monde as well as for the Compagnie Jean-Duceppe, the Théâtre de Quat'Sous and for the Théâtre Denise-Pelletier. She wrote and acted in the one woman performance Madame Louis 14.

Pintal has been artistic director for the Théâtre du Nouveau Monde since 1992.

As a stage director, she was recognized by the Association québécoise des critiques de théâtre (AQCT) for HA ha !... in 1990 and Hosanna in 1991. Les oranges sont vertes received a Masque Award in 1998 for best staging and best production. She received a Gascon-Thomas Award in 2001 from the National Theatre School of Canada.

Pintal also produced a number of television series: Le Grand Remous (1988–90) and Montréal P.Q. (1990-92), as well as television plays: Hosanna (1991), Tartuffe (1997) and Bilan (2002).

In 2002, she was named to the Order of Canada.

In 2014, she was an unsuccessful Parti Québécois candidate in the Quebec riding of Verdun, losing to Liberal Jacques Daoust.

In 2019, she was the recipient of a Lifetime Artistic Achievement Award as part of the Governor General's Performing Arts Awards. In 2021 she received the Prix Denise-Filiatrault for her body of work.

In 2025's Montreal municipal election, she ran for a council seat in the borough of Rosemont–La Petite Patrie, with the Ensemble party. She did not win her election.
