= Prix Ernest-Cormier =

The Prix Ernest-Cormier is an award by the Government of Quebec that is part of the Prix du Québec, given to individuals for an outstanding career in Quebec architecture. It was first awarded in 2014. It is named in honour of Ernest Cormier.

== Winners ==
- 2014 - Gilles Saucier and André Perrotte
- 2015 - not awarded
- 2016 - Daoust-Lestage, design firm founded by Renée Daoust et Réal Lestage
- 2017 - Éric Gauthier
- 2018 - Manon Asselin
- 2019 - Jean-Claude Poitras
- 2020 - Vincent Asselin, Malaka Ackaoui
- 2021 - Gérard Beaudet
- 2022 - Alain Fournier
- 2023 - Pierre Thibault
- 2024 - Serge Filion
- 2025 - Pierre Boyer-Mercier

== See also ==
- Architecture of Montreal
- Architecture of Canada
- Prix du Québec
