= La famille Plouffe =

Canadian television drama

La famille Plouffe is a Canadian television drama, more specifically a téléroman, about a Quebec City family that first aired in the French language on Société Radio-Canada in 1953. The show was created to fill a void in French-language television in Canada. Whereas the anglophone television branch of the Canadian Broadcasting Corporation could broadcast English-language shows from American stations, the francophone component of the CBC, Radio-Canada had to develop its own programs for its viewers from the earliest days of television in Canada. The show was one of the few that helped to launch the téléroman genre of programming in French Canada around the same time that the first telenovelas aired in Latin America.

The series was also broadcast live in English as The Plouffe Family on CBC Television the following year and ran on both networks until 1959. The series was revived in the 1980s as a miniseries.

The series was based on the novel Les Plouffe, by Roger Lemelin. It chronicled the daily life of a working-class family in the years after World War II. The family included the patriarch Théophile, a former provincial cycling champion who has settled into life as a plumber, and his wife, Joséphine, a naïve but kind-hearted mother, who dotes on her adult children: Napoléon, Ovide, Cécile, and Guillaume.

It was designated and preserved as a "masterwork" by the Audio-Visual Preservation Trust of Canada, a charitable non-profit organization dedicated to promoting the preservation of Canada’s audio-visual heritage.

== Cast ==
- Théophile Plouffe – Paul Guèvremont
- Joséphine Plouffe – Amanda Alarie
- Napoléon Plouffe – Émile Genest
- Ovide Plouffe – Jean-Louis Roux, Marcel Houben
- Guillaume Plouffe – Pierre Valcour
- Cécile Plouffe – Denise Pelletier
- Gédéon Plouffe – Doris Lussier
- Démérise Plouffe – Nana de Varennes
- Onésime Ménard – Rolland Bédard
- Rita Toulouse – Lise Roy, Jeannine Mignolet
- Blanche Toulouse – Lucie Poitras
- Jeanne Labrie – Thérèse Cadorette
- Stan Labrie – Jean Duceppe
- Père Alexandre – Guy Provost
- Martine Plouffe – Margot Campbell
- Aimé Plouffe – Jean Coutu
- Flora Plouffe – Ginette Letondal
- Agathe Plouffe – Clémence DesRochers
- Rosaire Joyeux – Camille Ducharme
- Jacqueline Sévigny – Amulette Garneau
- Alain Richard – Guy Godin
- Hélène Giguère – Françoise Graton
- Alphonse Tremblay – Ernest Guimond
