= Yvonne Hubert =

Belgian-born Canadian pianist and pedagogue

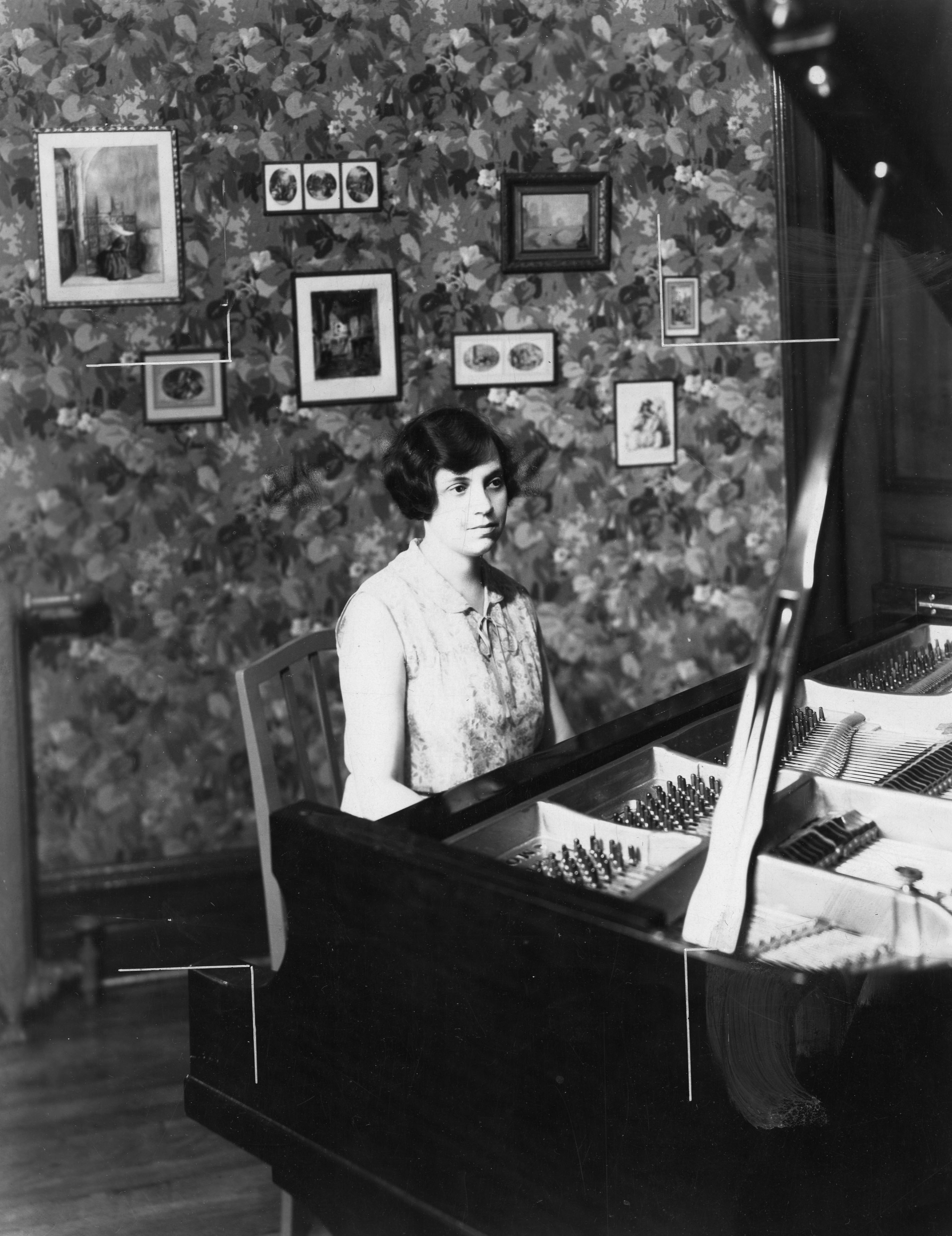
- Hubert, c. 1926
- Born: 28 May 1895; Mouscron, Belgium
- Died: 8 June 1988 (aged 93)
- Occupations: Pianist, teacher

Yvonne Hubert (28 May 1895 – 8 June 1988) was a Belgian-born Canadian pianist and pedagogue. Considered one of the most eminent professors of Canada, for her strong personality, inexhaustible energy and exceptional quality of her teaching, Yvonne Hubert deeply influenced her students by giving them a strong technical background, and so enriched musical life in Montreal and Canada.

== Biography ==
Hubert was born in Mouscron, Belgium in 1895. She began her musical studies at the Conservatory of Lille, where she won the first prize for piano in 1906. Her remarkable talent attracted the attention of Alfred Cortot, André Gedalge, Egon Petri, and Gabriel Fauré. She enrolled at the Paris Conservatoire in 1906, first studying piano with Marguerite Long and later in 1908, with Alfred Cortot. She also studied chamber music with Camille Chevillard and theory with Maurice Emmanuel. She won first prize for piano at the Paris Conservatoire in 1911.

Under the tutelage of Fauré, who entrusted her with the first performances of several of his works, she began a career as a soloist and chamber musician in France, Belgium, Canada and the United States, and also accompanied her brother, cellist Marcel Hubert.

In 1926, she moved to Montreal and in 1929 and founded the Alfred Cortot School of Piano, to promote the French tradition, and in particular the method of Cortot.

From 1945 to 1970 she taught at the Conservatoire de Musique de Montréal. She also taught at the École de musique Vincent d'Indy from 1952 to 1979.

Her students, many of whom have won national and international competitions, included: Henri Brassard, Philip Stanley Cohen (father of composer & conductor Warren Cohen), André Laplante, Michel Dussault, Marc Durand, Janina Fialkowska, Thomas Green, Lorraine Prieur, William Tritt, Louis Lortie, Marc-André Hamelin, Claude Labelle, Gérald Lévesque, Kenneth Gilbert, Suzanne Blondin, Suzanne Goyette, Serge Garant, Gilles Manny, Bernard Lagacé, and Ronald Turini.

An Yvonne Hubert archive is held at the Université de Montréal. Her brother was the cellist Marcel Hubert, whom she also accompanied in performance.

== Honours ==
- 1979 - Medal of the Canadian Music Council
- 1979 - Honorary Diploma of the Canadian Conference of the Arts
- 1981 - Honorary LLD from Concordia University, Montreal v
- 1987 - Price Calixa-Lavallée
- 1989 - The Place des Arts named its largest rehearsal room in her honour.
