= Denis Gougeon =

Canadian composer and music educator (born 1951)

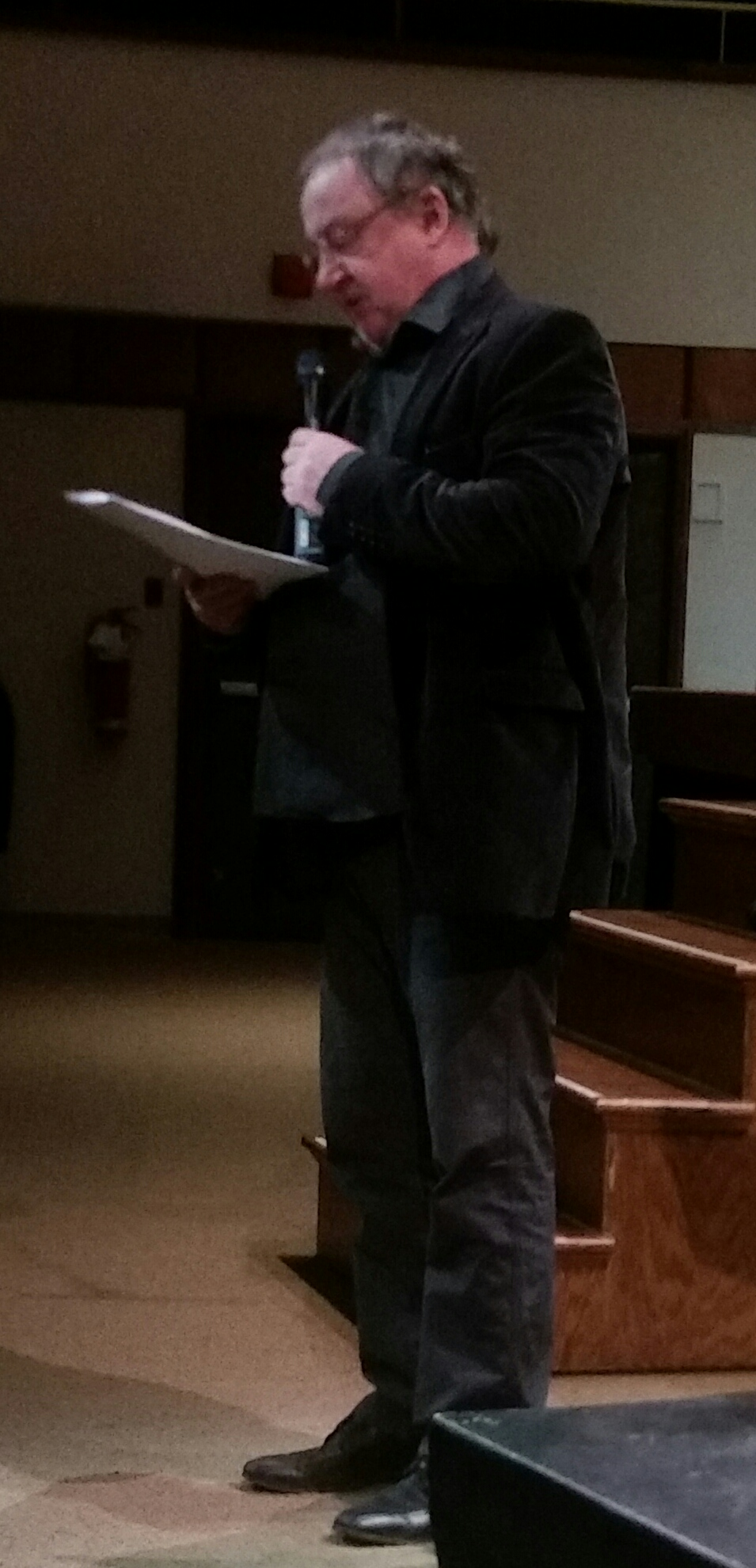
Denis Gougeon inside the Claude Champagne Hall photographed in Montréal, Québec, Canada.

Denis Gougeon (born November 16, 1951) is a Canadian composer and music educator. His more than 80 compositions encompass a wide variety of genres, including orchestral works, chamber music, opera, ballet, and pieces for solo instruments and voice. Notable ensembles to have included his compositions in their performance repertoire include the Bavarian State Ballet, the Canadian Opera Company, the I Musici de Montréal Chamber Orchestra, Le Nouvel Ensemble Moderne, New Music America, the Norwegian National Opera and Ballet, the Quebec Contemporary Music Society, and the Vancouver New Music Society.

== Early life and education ==
Born in Granby, Quebec, Gougeon began his career as a primarily self-taught composer. He later entered the Université de Montréal (UdeM) where he studied music composition with Serge Garant and André Prévost.

== Career ==
From 1984 to 1988 Gougeon taught music composition at McGill University. In 1989 he became the first composer-in-residence of the Montreal Symphony Orchestra, holding that post until 1992. In 2000 he won the Opus Prize for Composer of the Year from the Conseil québécois de la musique.

In 2001 Gougeon joined the music faculty at the Université de Montréal. Among his notable pupils is composer Analia Llugdar. He won the Society of Composers, Authors and Music Publishers of Canada's Jan V. Matejcek Concert Music Award for three consecutive years (2001, 2002, 2003).

In 2007 he won the Juno Award for Classical Composition of the Year for his Clere Vénus. In 2010 he composed an orchestral work, Phénix; that year Toy no 1 (Music Box) by Gougeon was awarded the first prize of a three-year-long composition competition organized by Radio France, the Shanghai Media Group and the International Spring Music Festival. The piece is written for traditional Chinese instruments and a symphonic orchestra.

In 2013 the Société Musique Contemporaine de Québec featured a number of Gougeon's works in its performances. His composition "Tutti" was commissioned by Toronto's Esprit Orchestra.

In October 2024, Les Prix du Quebec presented the Prix Denise-Filiatrault to Gougeon for his contribution to the performing arts.

In February 2025, Gougeon was named as a recipient of the Governor General's Performing Arts Award.

== Sources ==
- Denis Gougeon at The Canadian Encyclopedia
