= Prix Guy-Mauffette =

Radio and television award in Québec, Canada

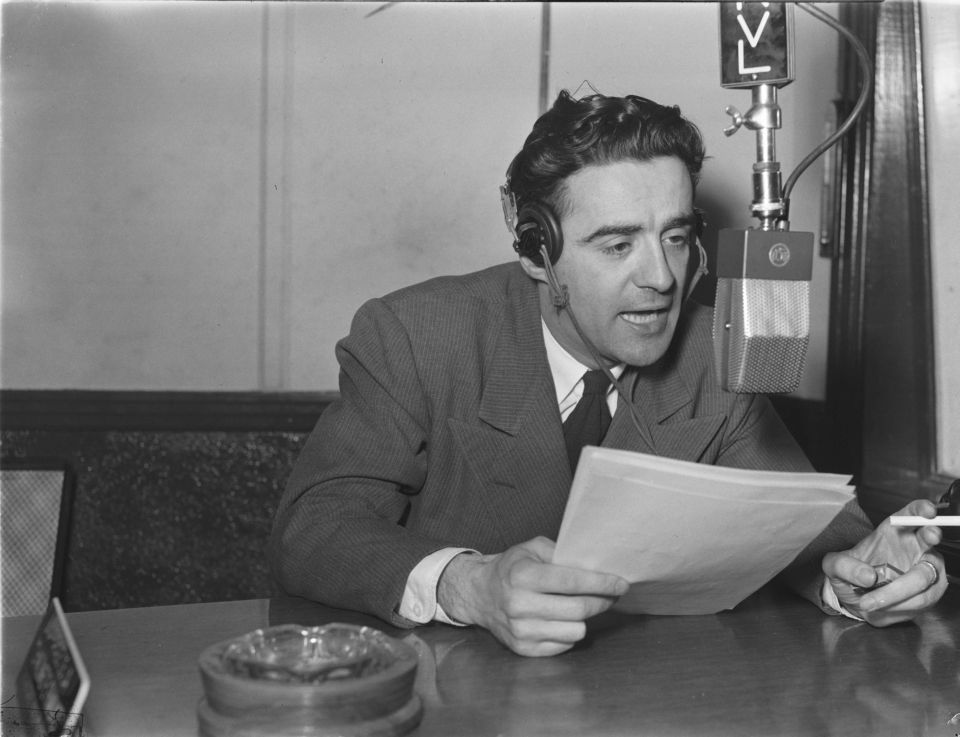
Guy Mauffette animating a radio show aired on CKVL in Montreal, 1948.

The Prix Guy-Mauffette is an award by the Government of Quebec that is part of the Prix du Québec, given to individuals for an outstanding career in the radio and television arts in Quebec. It was first awarded in 2011. It is named in honour of Guy Mauffette (1915–2005).

Guy Mauffette was a pioneer director and radio host in Quebec.

== Winners ==
- 2011 - Janette Bertrand
- 2012 - Jacques Languirand
- 2013 - Daniel Bertolino
- 2014 - Lise Payette
- 2015 - Jean Bissonnette
- 2016 - Bernard Derome
- 2017 - Jean-Claude Lord
- 2018 - Francine Grimaldi
- 2019 - Raymond Saint-Pierre
- 2020 - Mohamed Lotfi Laraki
- 2021 - Céline Galipeau
- 2022 - Alain Saulnier
- 2023 - Michel Delorme
- 2024 - François Cousineau
- 2025 - France Castel

== See also ==
- History of broadcasting in Canada
- Prix du Québec
- Estelle Mauffette
