= Jenny Margetts =

Canadian advocate for indigenous women and children (1936–1991)

- Born: Jane Maria Shirt; June 14, 1936; Saddle Lake Reserve, Alberta, Canada
- Died: October 18, 1991 (aged 55)

Jenny Margetts (born Jane Maria Shirt, 14 June 1936 – 18 October 1991) was a Canadian indigenous woman who advocated for women and children.

== Biography ==
Margetts was born to Felix and Louisa Doghead Shirt on the Saddle Lake Reserve in Alberta, Canada. Growing up in a family of ten, she attended Blue Quills Indian Residential School for nine years. Following graduation from Victoria Composite High School in Edmonton, Alberta. she decided to enter the Dominican Order. Jenny traveled with Bishop Lussier by train and arrived in Quebec City, Quebec on April 22, 1954. After six months as a postulant she became a novice and chose the name Louisa in honor of her mother. Sister Louisa spent the next two years in religious formation, learning French. Shortly after taking her First Vows returned to Saddle Lake to work in a newly established mission. She told of having a dream of a man crying, and her phoning home to Saddle Lake, and being told, "Come back. You do not belong there. We need you here." During this period, she decided the religious life was not for her, and left the Order in June 1957. She remembered taking a social justice course from a priest who told her that even one person who is concerned can make changes. Three years later she married, started a family, and became an activist for Indigenous women and children.

== Achievements ==
=== Women's rights activist ===
The Voice of Alberta Native Women's Society was founded in 1968 by Indigenous activists, including Jenny, to advocate on behalf of Status and Non-Status women. Women's organizations focused on many issues and it's been noted that urban women from Edmonton, Alberta, like Jenny, focused on political, social, and economic concerns while those from Calgary, Alberta, focused more on social and cultural activities for youth. Jenny left the organization in 1970 because she felt they weren't doing enough, saying, "It’s a Native women’s rights organization, but it’s not even trying to fulfill its mandate to work for Native women’s rights. You don’t even know what women’s rights are. You’ve got to learn. I am willing to learn and I’m getting out, but you haven’t heard the last of me."

With a small group of Alberta women, including Nellie Carlson and Kathleen Steinhauer, connected to her through their Saddle Lake families, Jenny forged links with Mary Two-Axe Earley at Kahnawake (Quebec) and other Indigenous women across Canada to create the Indian Rights for Indian Women (IRIW) association in 1971.. She remained the spokesperson for this organization as well as a leader of this movement throughout the rest of her life. From 1975 to 1982 she was president of this association, aimed at giving Indigenous women the right to equality in the Canadian constitution.

A 1951 amendment to Canada's Indian Act, known as section 12 (1) (b), stated that any Treaty woman who married a non-Treaty man would automatically give up her own legal Indian status; her children would also lose their Indian status. This meant the woman and her children would no longer be allowed to live or be buried on their reserve. In addition, the woman and her children would lose all access to benefits guaranteed by treaties. However, if a Treaty man married a non-Treaty woman, his rights and identity would remain intact; the wife and her children would gain full Treaty status. The work to repeal this part of the Indian Act caused hostility and deep divisions within the Indigenous community. There were protests both for and against the bill, particularly among male elders who feared an influx of formerly-evicted women, their non-Treaty husbands, and children back to the reserves. Jenny concurred, observing that "Sometimes Indians are their own worst enemies." (6) At the national level women were not always in agreement, including delegates who wanted to include Quebec's rights to self-determination. "IRIW President, Jenny Margetts, also spoke and stated (to huge applause) that while she wished ‘Marlene and her group success, I realize that we have to be specific about Native women’s rights and we should stick to women’s rights.’"

The IRIW association continued until 1985 when section 12 (1) (b) was finally repealed to adhere to the new Canadian Charter of Rights and Freedoms. In 1985, Jenny got back her Indian status that she had lost when she married Gordon Margetts. She was still co-president of the IRIW association when she died in 1991.

=== Educator ===
One day in the early 1970s, Margetts' mother called her and expressed concern that her grandchildren were not learning the Cree language and that the school system was not offering enough cultural teaching. She was supported by a school superintendent who offered to help Jenny in setting up a program. They wrote a proposal and submitted it to the Edmonton School Board. Jenny recounted, "With missionary zeal, we set out to outline all the reasons why Native kids needed their own kindergarten. Cree language would be taught, a cultural component would be added to the existing curricula, but most of all, there would be the opportunity for these little Native children to feel good about being Native, in their own Native setting." The Awasis Program was launched in March 1972 with a kindergarten, and six years later included children up to Grade 6. Awasis is the Cree word for child.

After establishing the first Indigenous elementary school program in Canada, Jenny helped create the Sacred Circle Project, a program to develop initiatives and provide support to all activities related to the education of or about Indigenous people. Elders, the Indigenous community, and the Edmonton Public School District staff formed the nucleus of the project, which focused on eight areas: curriculum development, summer activities, lead teachers, classroom aides, a resource centre, cross-cultural awareness services for teachers and the community, and a home-school liaison component. From its start in one urban setting, it soon expanded to other cities and included both public and Catholic schools. As a result of lobbying by concerned Indigenous people as well as school system personnel throughout Alberta, in the summer of 1980 the Department of Education ear-marked funding for such programs, resulting in large urban school systems developing programs on a much broader scale to meet the needs of Indigenous students. One review identified two major areas of concern with these programs: burnout resulting from Indigenous staff placed in schools that never had Indigenous people working in them before, and the limited cultural knowledge of Indigenous students raised in urban settings. These were issues Jenny understood well and used them in her presentations at conferences and before provincial and federal education task forces.

The Province of Alberta honored Jenny posthumously as one of the great Edmontonians of the century for "establishing the Awasis kindergarten, the first Canadian aboriginal kindergarten within a public school system, and for her work for post-secondary education access for aboriginals."

=== Foster parent ===
From her early years of involvement with the Voice of Alberta Native Women Society, foster care was a major issue. The Society received a grant to employ Indigenous women on a part-time basis to promote foster care and recruit foster homes, and to survey the number of Indigenous families who did not receive any financial assistance while providing care to children who were not their own. Jenny and Gordon became foster parents in April 1983 and took in three children (ages 16, 13, and 12). Three years later she described one foster son as very loving, still hyperactive, who had finally stopped nightly bed-wetting. She wrote that she dealt with him "in the Indian way and had him doctored in the sweat lodge by a medicine man. He shook like a leaf – I held him close to me and vowed I would raise him as my own." Finding Indigenous foster parents to care for Indigenous children was always a challenge and dealing with mothers of children in care was often difficult. One boy "tried calling a whole bunch of numbers to reach his mom. No one was home at the numbers he called. He finally broke down. I try to explain why he's in care. It is so difficult to say if they cared, they could call but you can't hurt the kid like that. I have to help them face reality. All this crying is emotionally draining." In addition to caring for foster children, the Margetts took education classes on stress management, foster parents’ role in court, and dealing with lying and stealing. They also became active in local and provincial groups.

== Personal life ==
In 1960, she married Gordon Margetts, owner of a mobile welding business. They had three children.

After completing a 2-year business program at McTavish Business College, one of her first jobs was as office manager for the newly formed Alberta Native Communications Society, whose mandate was to produce and provide communications of all media (print, radio, television, film) from an Indigenous perspective to the Indigenous peoples of Alberta. She was fired from the position after she challenged the men who ran the organization. She later said, "It was then and there that I decided to fight and grow...I discovered that Native women were just going nowhere. They weren't taken seriously." She later worked as a case worker for a social service organization, and for five years was self-employed in a family business.

Her volunteer work was as important to her as her paid work. She was instrumental in setting up and coordinating the Awasis Program under the Edmonton Public School Board and chaired the Sacred Circle Committee, was a board member of the Alberta Status of Women Action Committee, and a volunteer leader for the Girl Guides of Canada. She served on the Ad Hoc Committee on Cree Languages at the University of Alberta, the Ad Hoc Committee on Family Violence through the federal government, and a Task Force Member on Native Children with the Department of Indian Affairs and Northern Development. Moreover, she was a founder of Indian Rights for Indian Women and active at both provincial and national levels.

Jenny's lifelong interest in education led her to take courses in early childhood education, and in 1986 she enrolled at the University of Alberta. For an anthropology class she outlined her own Women’s Life Cycle, noting that at mid-life, aged 50, she was "solid in marriage, children grown, and clear thinking." She found university studies both exhilarating and frustrating, writing, "I took on five courses in the first term, which I quickly found out was too heavy a load for someone returning to class after 30 years away from school. To this day I vaguely remember how I managed to remain sane. All I remember about exams before Christmas is that I had diarrhea for days from sheer nervousness. Luckily, I have a son who is in his third year and helped me cope." In her journal she wrote out, five times, "I, Jenny Margetts, will remember everything I study in all my courses." After years of community activism, university classes seemed a formality. "At this time in my life, what I want most is getting a certificate to teach the Cree language. I entered the U of A in the Faculty of Education and find that isn't what I really want to do. Our Cree Nation is suffering from a lack of Cree speaking teachers and I am fortunate in the fact that I am fluent in Cree, French and English. I want to teach Cree! However, this university lacks the necessary courses to qualify me to teach, to get that piece of paper..."

=== Death ===
During her studies, Margetts was diagnosed with cancer, and after a three year battle with the disease died at home on October 18, 1991, at the age of 55. Her obituary stated she was "a woman who devoted her life to eliminating sex discrimination among Indian band membership and helping Indian children bridge the gap between cultures." Jenny is buried in Evergreen Memorial Gardens in Edmonton, Alberta.
