= Toponym'Elles =

Initiative to improve toponymic representation of women's contributions in Montreal

Toponym'Elles is a name bank established by the City of Montreal to recognize and highlight the historical contributions of women. Its primary purpose is to serve as a resource for increasing the presence of women in toponymy by assigning their names to public spaces such as parks, streets, and squares in Montreal.

== History ==
Toponym'Elles was launched on 2 March 2016, shortly before International Women's Day. The initial database contained 375 names, selected by linguist Gabriel Martin, a number chosen to coincide with Montreal’s 375th anniversary. At the time of its launch, only 6% of city locations were named after women. Montreal was the first city in Quebec to develop a database of this kind, while a similar proposal in Sherbrooke in 2018 did not advance.

The initial list featured prominent and lesser-known women from Quebec, women’s collectives, titles of major cultural works created by women, and names connected to Indigenous cultures. It also included notable figures from across Canada and internationally. A separate list of approximately 85 living women was kept confidential because preparing posthumous tributes for living individuals was considered socially sensitive.

Following its public launch, the database was opened to submissions from the general public, expanding to 453 names by 2019.

== Named places ==
Thérèse Cadorette was the first individual honored through Toponym'Elles, with a square named after her in 2016. Other early examples include Ethel-Stark, Jovette-Marchessault, and Julie-Hamelin parks; Grace-Hopper and Jacqueline-Sicotte streets; Place des Montréalaises; and Alice-Guy Square.

Palomino-Brind’Amour Park, also named from the database, was recognized as a preferred project by the Toponymy Commission in 2018. Additionally, the name of Mary Two-Axe Earley was chosen for a future metro station announced in September 2025, derived from the initial Toponym'Elles list.

== See also ==
- Commission de toponymie du Québec

== Bibliography ==
- Martin, Gabriel; Beaudoin, Sarah (2019). Femmes et toponymie : de l'occultation à la parité. Sherbrooke: Éditions du Fleurdelysé.
