= Commission de toponymie du Québec =

Public body responsible for the management of Quebec place names

The Commission de toponymie du Québec (French pronunciation: [kɔmisjɔ̃ də tɔpɔnimi dy kebɛk], Toponymy Commission of Québec) is the Government of Québec's public body responsible for cataloging, preserving, making official and publicizing Québec's place names and their origins according to the province's toponymy rules. It also provides recommendations to the government with regard to toponymic changes.

Its mandate covers the namings of:

- natural geographical features (lakes, rivers, mountains, etc.)
- constructed features (dams, embankments, bridges, etc.)
- administrative units (wildlife sanctuaries, administrative regions, parks, etc.)
- inhabited areas (villages, towns, Indian reserves, etc.)
- roadways (streets, roads, boulevards, etc.)

A child agency of the Office québécois de la langue française, it was created in 1977 through jurisdiction defined in the Charter of the French Language to replace the Commission of Geography, created in 1912.

== See also ==
- Toponymy
- Toponym'elles
- Office québécois de la langue française
- Toponymy of the Kerguelen Islands
