= Thérèse Cadorette =

Canadian actress

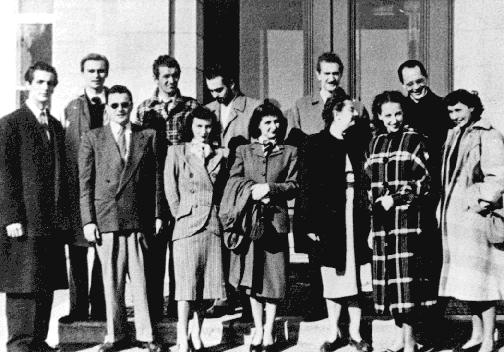
Thérèse Cadorette is pictured as the last person to the right in this photograph taken in 1944

Thérèse Cadorette (1925 – 2007) was a Québécois writer and actress. A square in Montreal, Quebec, was renamed to honour her in 2016, as part of the Toponym'elles initiative. Thérèse Cadorette began her career in theatre with the Compagnons de Saint-Laurent. She later pursued a career in television and was cast in roles for La famille Plouffe and Les Belles Histoires des pays d'en haut. On November 25, 2016, a local square was officially renamed Square Thérèse-Cadorette as part of Montreal's efforts to improve the representation of women in public spaces.
