= Prix Denise-Filiatrault =

Award

The Prix Denise-Filiatrault is an award by the Government of Quebec that is part of the Prix du Québec, given to individuals for an outstanding career in theatre arts. It was first awarded in 2021. It is named in honour of Quebec stage actress Denise Filiatrault.

== Winners ==
- 2021 - Lorraine Pintal
- 2022 - Madeleine Careau
- 2023 - Ginette Noiseux
- 2024 - Denis Gougeon
- 2025 - Francine Bernier
