= Théâtre du Rideau Vert =

Theatre in Montreal, Quebec, Canada

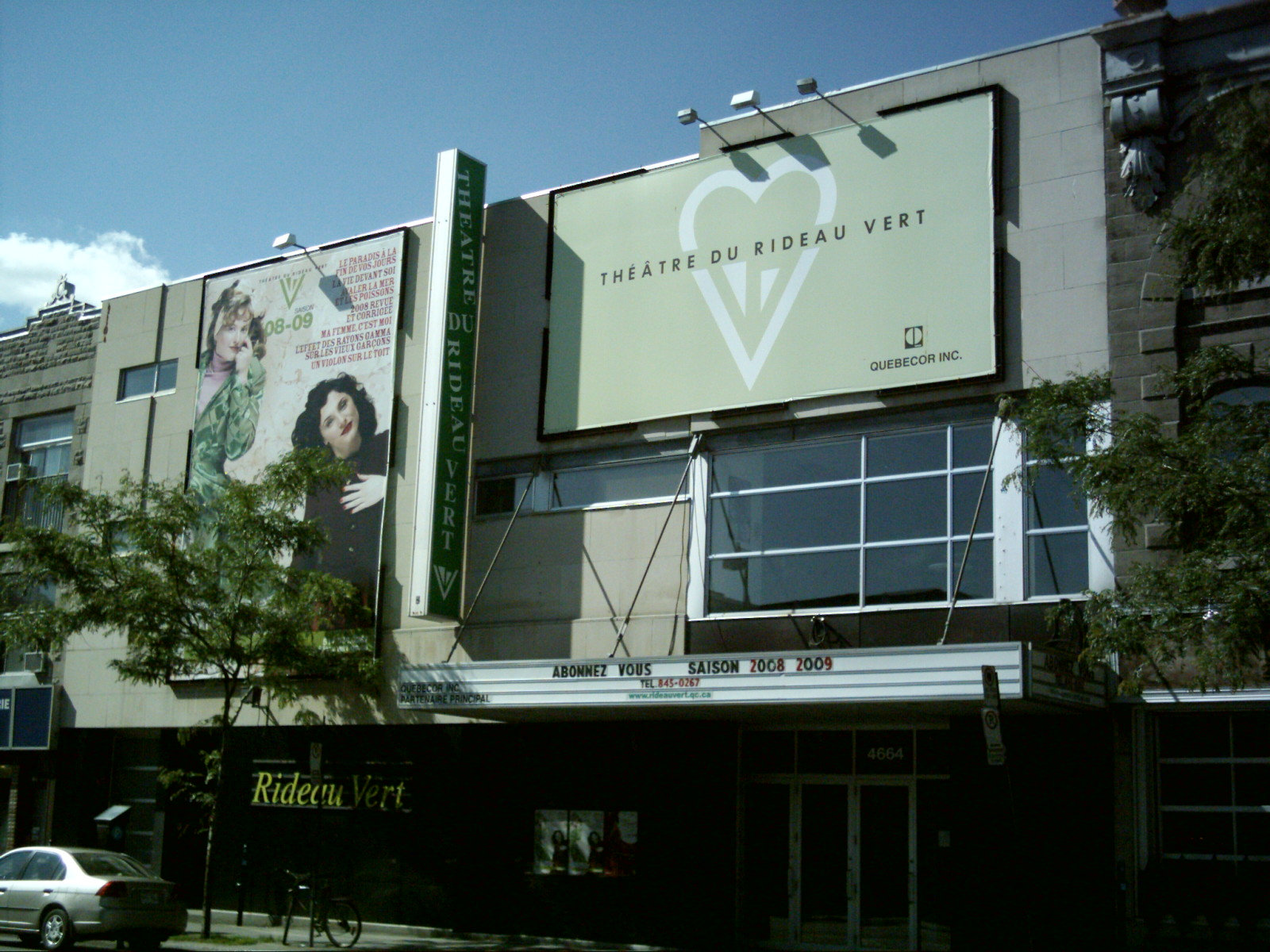
The Théâtre du Rideau Vert is located on Saint Denis Street.

The Théâtre du Rideau Vert is a theatre in Montreal, Quebec, Canada. It is located at 4664 Saint Denis Street in the borough of Le Plateau-Mont-Royal.

Founded in 1949 by Yvette Brind'Amour and Mercedes Palomino, the Théâtre du Rideau Vert was the first professional French-language theatre in Canada. It was also one of the first Quebec theatres to invest in the creation of local works by fostering the emergence of Felix Leclerc, Marie-Claire Blais, Gratien Gélinas, Michel Tremblay, Antonine Maillet, etc. It is also where Michel Tremblay created the Joual piece Les Belles-Soeurs in 1968.

After working in various venues (Compagnons de Saint-Laurent, Monument-National, Gesù, and l'Anjou), the Théâtre du Rideau Vert settled permanently in 1960 on Saint Denis Street in Montreal, in the old Stella Theatre. Since then, the theatre has been renovated twice. Its last renovation occurred in 1991 and focused on increasing capacity to 426 seats.

Denise Filiatrault is currently the artistic director. In January 2015, Filiatrault and the Théâtre du Rideau Vert were criticized by a coalition of Montreal arts groups for a year-end production in which a white actor portrayed the black hockey player P.K. Subban in blackface.

== See also ==
- Compagnons de Saint-Laurent
- Théâtre du Nouveau Monde
