= Martine Époque =

Canadian choreographer

Martine Époque (April 30, 1942 – January 18, 2018) was a French-born Canadian dance educator and choreographer living in Quebec.

She was born in Six-Fours-les-Plages and studied music and dance at the Conservatoire de Toulon, the Schola Cantorum de Paris and the Institut Jaques-Dalcroze in Geneva. She was recruited by the Université de Montréal to develop a dance course for the physical education program and came to Canada in 1967.

Époque founded the contemporary dance company Le Groupe Nouvelle Aire and served as its artistic director from 1968 to 1982. In 1999, she published a memoir Le Groupe Nouvelle Aire en Mémoires, 1968-1982. Choreographers and educators who grew out of that company included Édouard Lock, Louise Lecavalier, Ginette Laurin, Paul-André Fortier, Daniel Léveillé and Louise Bédard. She also started the company Danse Actuelle Martine Époque, which operated from 1981 to 1988.

She helped establish the dance program at the Université du Québec à Montréal and played an important role in the creation of the dance department in 1985 and the development of a master's program in dance in 1993. She helped establish the Agora de la danse, a creative space for contemporary dance in Montreal, and Passerelle 840, a laboratory ans showcase for experiments in choreography.

She received the Clifford E. Lee Award in 1983. In 1994, she was awarded the Prix Denise-Pelletier.

Her short film Coda: the Finale for The Rite of Spring, co-directed with Denis Poulin, was presented at the 2014 Toronto International Film Festival.
