= Robert W. Prevost =

American philosopher (born 1955)

Robert Prevost
- Born: Robert Ward Prevost; February 1955 (age 71)

Academic background
- Education: Baylor University; Trinity Evangelical Divinity School; University of Oxford; University of Texas
- Thesis: Theism as an Explanatory Hypothesis
- Doctoral advisor: Basil Mitchell; Richard Swinburne

Academic work
- Discipline: Philosophy
- School or tradition: Anglicanism
- Institutions: Wingate University
- Main interests: God in Christianity

Robert Ward Prevost (born February 1955) is an American philosopher. He has been an associate professor of philosophy at Wingate University in North Carolina since 1994. He wrote Probability and Theistic Explanation, a book which argues for Christian theism.

== Education and career ==
Robert Ward Prevost received a Bachelor of Arts in philosophy from Baylor University, a Master of Arts in philosophy of religion from Trinity Evangelical Divinity School, Doctor of Philosophy from the University of Oxford, and Juris Doctor from the University of Texas. He co-edited a collection of essays by Basil Mitchell, published as How to Play Theological Ping Pong in 1990. A version of his PhD thesis would later be published as a book as Probability and Theistic Explanation in 1992. He is currently an associate professor of philosophy at Wingate University, having served there since 1994.

== Probability and Theistic Explanation ==
Probability and Theistic Explanation, a part of the Oxford Theological Monographs, was written by Prevost and published in 1990. The book presents Prevost's argument for Christian theism using informal reasoning and explores Prevost's conception of God.

== Confusion with Pope Leo XIV ==
Robert W. Prevost has been frequently mistaken with Pope Leo XIV due to sharing a similar name with the pope's birth name (Robert Francis Prevost). This homonymy has caused some media outlets to mistakenly mix up the two, and online forums have misattributed quotes from the philosopher to the pope. El Cronista compared the situation of two men sharing the same name to Borges' short story The Other.
