= Robert Prévost (historian) =

Canadian historian (1918–2007)

- Born: 1918; Quebec, Canada
- Died: 2007 (aged 88–89); Beauport, Canada
- Occupations: Journalist, historian, writer

Robert Prévost (1918–2007) was a Canadian journalist, historian, and author from Quebec.

== Biography ==
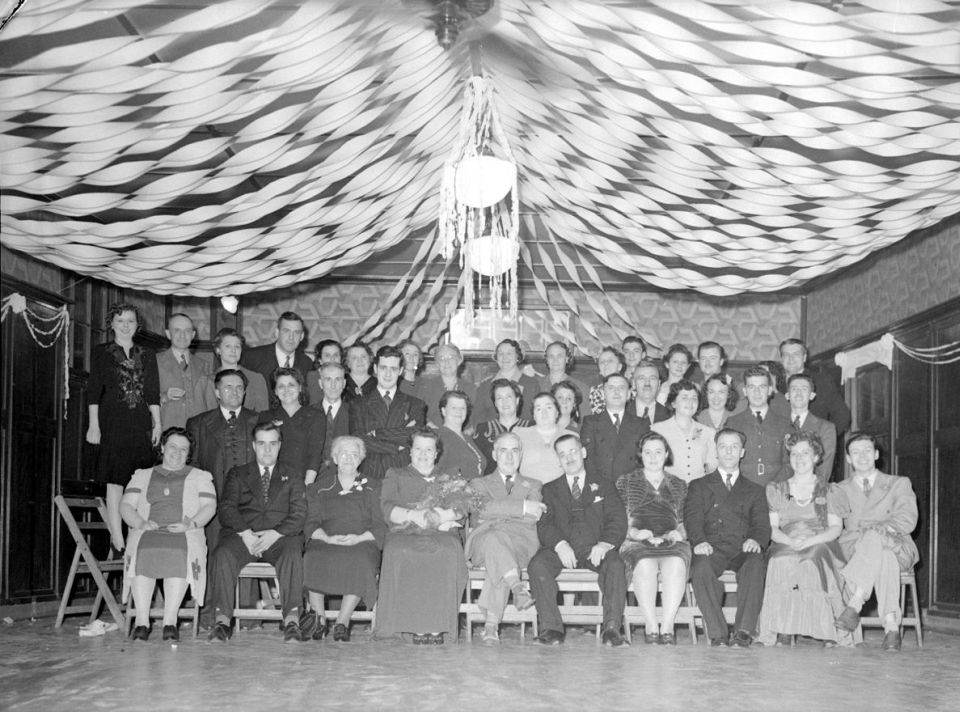
Employees of Le Petit Journal gathered around Robert Prévost, 19 September 1942

Robert Prévost had three careers, as a journalist, civil servant, and historian. His preferred activities over more than sixty years were historical research and, especially through writing, popularizing historical facts, notably to stimulate pride among Quebecers regarding their origins.

A journalist and columnist in Montreal for Le Petit Journal and La Presse for 17 years, then a civil servant for 32 years, particularly in France, Robert Prévost dedicated his life to promoting Quebec. As director of the Provincial Advertising Office, later renamed the Quebec Tourist Office, and subsequently Assistant Deputy Minister in the Ministry of Tourism, Hunting, and Fishing, he significantly contributed to the growth of Quebec tourism abroad. Notably, as the former Commissioner General for Quebec Tourism in Paris, he received the insignia of Chevalier des Arts et des Lettres for his contributions to deepening cultural and human relations between Quebec and France.

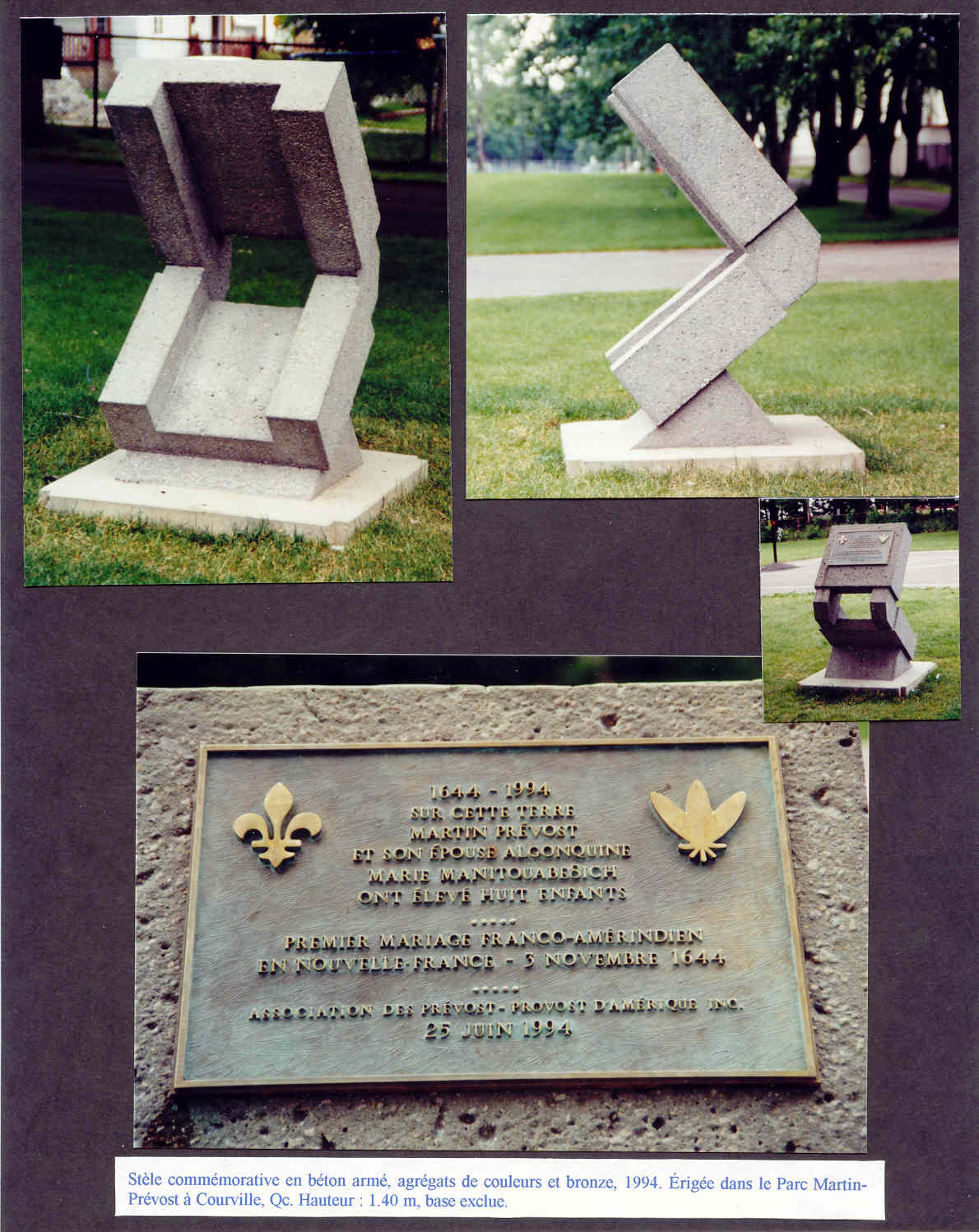
In Beauport, Beauport, Quebec, commemorative stele of the Association of the Prévost-Provost Families of America

Starting in 1990, he participated in founding the Association of Prévost-Provost Families of America, which worked towards erecting a commemorative stele honoring the pioneering couple of New France, Martin Prévost and his Indigenous wife, Marie Manitouabe8itch, an Algonquin educated by the Ursulines of Quebec. This stele, a cantilevered structure made of reinforced concrete and colored aggregates bearing a bronze plaque, was designed and executed by his son Alain, a sculptor. It was inaugurated in June 1994 on the land once inhabited by this couple, now known as Martin-Prévost Park, near Courville church (in the Chutes-Montmorency neighborhood).

The name Manitouabe8itch contains the numeral "8" instead of the letter "w" because at the time a Jesuit priest undertook to write an Algonquin-French dictionary, the letter "w" did not yet exist in the French language. The phoneme closest to it at the time was represented by the pronunciation of the number "8."

Following acts of vandalism, the stele was moved a few years later to a better-lit location near Larue Street.

In his second-to-last book, Mon tour de jardin ("My Tour of the Garden"), written in 2000–2001, he did not mention that the creator and craftsman of the stele was his own son.

A long-time resident of the Montreal region, Robert Prévost chose to spend his retirement, beginning at the age of 80 in 1998, in the vicinity of his paternal ancestor, Martin Prévost, in Beauport, where he died at the age of 89 in 2007.

He was the younger brother of Arthur Prévost (1910–2004), a journalist (1936–1969) and audacious improviser known for his appearances on the television show Les insolences d'une caméra.

== Robert Prévost Collection ==
Robert Prévost divided his archival legacy among several organizations tasked with preserving them and making them publicly accessible.

=== Canadian-French Genealogical Society, Montreal ===
The Robert-Prévost Collection (P18), preserved since its creation in May 1997 by the Société généalogique canadienne-française, contains a collection of photographic documents (among 0.06 meters of original documents) and especially slides (9739 slides of 35 mm) from the donor's travels, classified numerically and identified by themes listed in a summary inventory. They were taken in France, Quebec, and the United States between 1980 and 2000. A list of the slideshow conferences given by the author is included in the second part of the inventory.

=== Montreal Archives Centre, Montreal ===
The archival collection of journalist and civil servant Robert Prévost is preserved at the Montreal Archives Centre in the Bibliothèque et Archives nationales du Québec

This collection covers the period from 1748 to 1992 and includes 1.71 meters of textual and photographic documents as well as 109 sound recordings (16-inch discs). These archives reflect Robert Prévost's enduring interest in research and the popularization of French-American history. Additionally included is the series Sciences et aventures ("Science and Adventures," a magazine aimed at popularizing recent scientific and technological progress), several episodes of which were broadcast by radio station CKAC of Montreal. The Films 1958–1969 series of the collection notably illustrates half a century of representation of the county of Deux-Montagnes by Arthur Sauvé and his son Paul Sauvé; among others, photographs in the series Photographs 1940–1990 include Acadian-Quebec politician and genealogist Bona Arsenault.

== Works ==
- La France des Québécois, Éditions internationales Alain Stanké, Recherches en France, Montréal, 1980, 310 p., 428 illustrations ISBN 2-7604-0084-0
  - La France des Québécois – Pages perdues et retrouvées, Éditions internationales Alain Stanké, Recherches en France, Montréal, 1998, 263 p., 215 illustrations ISBN 2-7604-0617-2
- Il y a toujours une première fois, Éditions internationales Alain Stanké, Éphémérides, Montréal, 1984, 390 p., 557 illustrations ISBN 2-7604-0216-9
- Les Douglas de Montréal, extrait de la revue Le Bugey, Belley (Ain, France), 1984, 30 p., 3 illustrations
- Québécoises d'hier et d'aujourd'hui, Éditions internationales Alain Stanké, Biographies, Montréal, 1985, 239 p., 9 illustrations ISBN 2-7604-0261-4
  - Figures de proue – Évocation de 700 femmes dépareillées, Éditions internationales Alain Stanké, Monographie, Montréal, 2000, 477 p., 85 illustrations ISBN 2-7604-0765-9
- Bacchus sur nos bords, extrait de L'histoire de l'alcool au Québec, Éditions internationales Alain Stanké, pour La Société des alcools du Québec, Montréal, 1986, 58 p., 51 illustrations ISBN 2-7604-0287-8
- Petit dictionnaire des citations québécoises, Éditions libre expression, Mots historiques et phrases plaisantes, Montréal, 1988, 262 p., 44 illustrations ISBN 2-8911-1342-X, 978-2-89111-342-7
- Le Paris des Québécois, Éditions libre expression, collection Guide historico-touristique, Montréal, 1989, 187 p., 94 illustrations ISBN 2-8911-1372-1
- 1690 : une année dans la vie de la famille LeMoyne, Société historique, Pointe-au-Pic, 1990, 8 p., 7 illustrations
- La France de l'Ouest des Québécois, Éditions libre expression, collection Guide historico-touristique, Montréal, 1990, 220 p., 161 illustrations ISBN 2-8911-1423-X
- Les Montréal de France, Éditions libre expression, collection Guide historico-touristique, Montréal, 1991, 160 p., 126 illustrations ISBN 2-8911-1463-9
- Témoin de nos commencements, Martin Prévost, 1611–1691, Éditions Archonte, Biographie, Montréal, 1991, 184 p., 101 illustrations ISBN 2-9802-5290-5
- Montréal, la folle entreprise – chronique d'une ville, Éditions internationales Alain Stanké, Monographie, Montréal, 1991, 527 p., 153 illustrations ISBN 2-7604-0387-4
  - Montreal – A History (translation by: Elizabeth Mueller and Robert Chodos). McClelland & Stewart, Toronto, 1993, 416 p, 153 illustrations ISBN 0-7710-7034-9
- Cent ans de transport en commun motorisé, Publications Proteau, Essai, Montréal, 1993, 315 p., 110 illustrations ISBN 2-9215-5236-1
- Portraits de familles pionnières, Éditions libre expression, Généalogie, Montréal,
  - Tome 1, 1993, 300 p., 108 illustrations ISBN 2-8911-1567-8, 978-2-89111-567-4
  - Tome 2, 1994, 345 p., 111 illustrations ISBN 2-8911-1604-6
  - Tome 3, 1995, 368 p., 107 illustrations ISBN 2-8911-1635-6
  - Tome 4, 1996, 334 p., 106 illustrations ISBN 2-8911-1664-X, 978-2-89111-664-0
  - Tome 5, 1997, 295 p., 96 illustrations ISBN 2-8911-1713-1, 978-2-89111-713-5
- La France des Acadiens, Les éditions d'Acadie, Moncton, Guide historico-touristique, 1994, 265 p., 132 illustrations ISBN 2-7600-0260-8
- Trois siècles de tourisme au Québec, Les éditions du Septentrion, Qiébec, 2000, 366 p., ill. ISBN 2-8944-8151-9, 978-2-89448-151-6
- Mon tour de jardin, Les éditions du Septentrion, Autobiographie, Qiébec, 2002, 238 p., ill., index ISBN 978-2-89448-312-1
- Mémorial de Canadiens français aux USA, Les éditions du Septentrion, Qiébec, 2003, 300 p., ill. ISBN 978-2-89448-352-7

== Honors ==
- 1980: Grand Prix Littéraire du Tourisme, de l'Association française des journalistes et écrivains du tourisme
- 1992: Prix Percy-W.-Foy, de la Société historique de Montréal
- 1992: Chevalier des Arts et des lettres, de la République française, pour sa contribution majeure en tant qu'historien à l'approfondissement des relations entre le Québec et la France sur le plan culturel mais aussi humain
- 1996: Prix Archange-Godbout, décerné par la Société généalogique canadienne-française
- 2000: Sa photo grand format est apposée sur le Mur des célébrités, au Centre municipal Laval, à Beauport
