= Robert Prévost (painter) =

French painter (1893–1967)

- Born: July 2, 1893; Avallon, France
- Died: August 17, 1967 (aged 74); Avallon, France
- Employer(s): Le Rire, L'illustré de Zurich, Les lectures du Foyer de Lausanne
- Known for: Watercolor, illustration, chronicler
- Notable work: Catalogue de la collection de dessins: Avallon juin 1940, Avallon en 1900

Robert Prévost (2 July 1893 – 17 August 1967) was a French painter from Avallon.

He spent most of his life in Avallon, a town which he depicted in numerous watercolors. He is well-known in Avallon for his representations of the town and its surroundings. In addition to his watercolors, he authored a work about Avallon that remains a reference to this day: Avallon en 1900. This book was first published in 1958, and was reissued in 1978 with nine previously unpublished chapters.

== Biography ==
Paul Marie Robert Prévost was the son of Suzanne Marthe Bailly (1872–1961) and Henri François Prévost (1863–1934). His father was an architect and was a member of the Avallon Studies Society (Société d'études d'Avallon) from 1904 to 1919. His father was also a watercolorist, as was his aunt, Marie Prévost.

He was a member of the Avallon Studies Society, where his name first appeared in 1932. He wrote several articles for the Society up until the 1960s.

He contributed as an illustrator and columnist to the magazine Le Rire. He created illustrations for advertisements (the term "réclame," common at the time, would be more appropriate).

From 1925 to 1935, he resided in Paris at 13 rue Saint Ambroise, where he contributed to Swiss magazines such as L'Illustré from Zurich and Les Lectures du Foyer from Lausanne.

He exhibited his work at the Salon des Artistes Indépendants and the Salon of the Société Nationale des Beaux-Arts.

After this period, he returned to Avallon and lived with his mother at 30 rue Cousin le Pont. He remained unmarried throughout his life.

In June 1940, he produced a series of wash drawings depicting the exodus, the debacle, and the arrival of German forces in Avallon. Some of these drawings were exhibited with the permission of the Kommandantur on July 25, 1940, in a bookstore in Avallon. On November 28, 1940, President P.E. Flandin recommended their acquisition by the town of Avallon for the museum's collection. This acquisition was unanimously approved by the municipal council on May 28, 1941. A catalog featuring 25 paintings was published by the Avallon Museum (Catalogue de la collection de dessins : Avallon juin 1940). This catalog was reissued in 2015 and is considered an important historical document from this troubled period in the history of France.

In 1958, he published Avallon en 1900, of which he was both author and illustrator. Through 31 chapters, the book portrays the history of the town of Avallon and its residents around the year 1900. Through anecdotes illustrated with his drawings, it presents the town's notable figures and significant events from that time. In 1978, the book was reissued, with nine unpublished chapters written by Prévost before his death in 1967.

== Works ==
=== Books as author and illustrator ===
- La Cathédrale et les grands sanctuaires d'Anvers
- Saint Pierre de Genève
- Bruges
- Saint Lazarre d'Avallon
- Les châteaux de la Loire
- Avallon en 1900

=== Books as illustrator ===
- Tricentenaire de Vauban. Programme Paris - Le Morvan - Avallon - Mai Juillet 1933
- Guide de la Collégiale Saint-Lazare d'Avallon
- Deux heures dans le vieil Avallon - Son site, ses monuments, sa collégiale

=== Watercolors ===
The Museum of Avallon holds around one hundred watercolors by Robert Prévost, which are regularly exhibited.

The Avallon Costume Museum presents numerous works by Robert Prévost as well as those by his aunt, Marie Prévost.

The Château de Bazoches, the residence of Sébastien Le Prestre, Marquis of Vauban, displays two works by Robert Prévost, including a general view of "Marshal Vauban’s Château at Bazoches", reproduced in the program celebrating Vauban’s tercentenary..
