= Saint-Jean-Baptiste Church (Montreal) =

Building in Quebec, Canada

Coordinates: 45°31′17″N 73°34′47″W

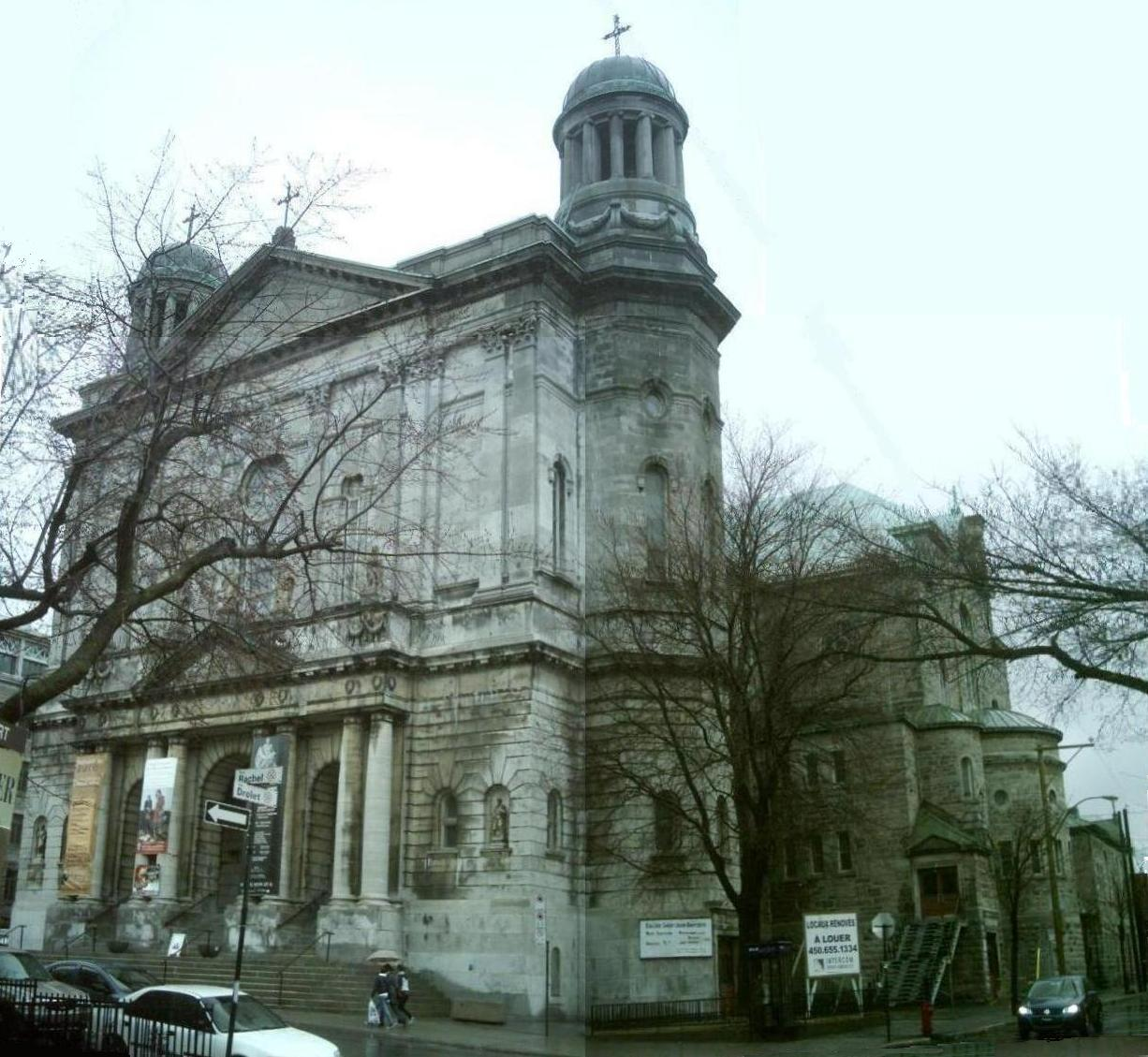
Saint-Jean-Baptiste Church

Saint-Jean-Baptiste Church (French: Église Saint-Jean-Baptiste de Montréal) is a Roman Catholic church built in 1872 in the borough of Le Plateau Mont-Royal in Montreal, Quebec, Canada.

Its address is 4237 Henri-Julien Avenue (corner Rachel Street). It can accommodate 2,800 people, and is the largest church in Montreal after the Notre-Dame Basilica and Saint Joseph's Oratory.

== History ==
In June 1872, the owners of the Village Saint-Jean-Baptiste yielded twenty plots of land on Rachel Street to the Archdiocese of Montreal. The first church was built in 1875 according to plans by Alphonse Raza.

In 1880, the citizens refused to contribute to a voluntary fund to pay for the construction of their church. Their refusal required the Village of Saint-Jean-Baptiste to pay for the church. As a result, the village experienced financial trouble and was quickly merged into the City of Montreal.

A major fire destroyed the church on January 29, 1898. Far from being discouraged, the parish then proposed a competition for the city's Catholic architects. Emile Vanier won the competition. The new church was inaugurated in 1903. It could accommodate up to 3,200 worshippers and featured a Casavant Frères organ.

On June 27, 1911, the church suffered another serious fire. The interior finishes, the roof and the dome disappeared in the flames, and the upper part of the exterior walls were also damaged.

Again, a competition for the reconstruction of the church was held. It was ultimately entrusted to architect Casimir Saint-Jean.

The church thus took its present form in 1912. The pediment is decorated with a carved motif and is surmounted by five statues representing Christ and the four evangelists. Two other statues of St. Pierre and St. Paul are installed in the side niches.

While the exterior of the church remains simple in appearance, the interior reflects that of Baroque revival architecture. The church is decorated with the original chandeliers, an ornamented pulpit, cabinet benches, confessionals, balustrades, and architectural ornamentation in cast plaster. Stained glass by Guido Nincheri was installed in 1932.

Saint-Jean-Baptiste Church was renovated in 1987 and was cited by the City of Montreal in 1989. Concerts are still given regularly.

== Organs ==
The Church of St. Jean-Baptiste de Montreal is one of the few churches in Canada equipped with two organs. It can, therefore, promote the presentation of works that require an imposing organ accompaniment. Restored in 1995 and 1996, the great organ of the gallery, Opus 615 of Casavant Frères, is one of the most prestigious instruments in North America.

The church also has a third organ, more modest, based in Saint-Louis Chapel, adjacent to the large church.
