= Bernard Lagacé =

Canadian organist and musicologist (1930–2025)

- Born: 21 November 1930; Saint-Hyacinthe, Quebec, Canada
- Died: 11 February 2025 (aged 94)
- Occupation(s): Organist, musicologist

Bernard Lagacé (21 November 1930 – 11 February 2025) was a Canadian organist, harpsichordist, and musicologist.

== Life and career ==
Bernard Lagacé was born in Saint-Hyacinthe, Quebec on 21 November 1930. He trained under Conrad Letendre at the Séminaire de Saint-Hyacinthe where he began working as an organist at the age of 14. In 1948 he served as temporary organist at the St-Jean-Baptiste Church in Montreal while Raymond Daveluy was traveling in Europe, and later began playing there regularly in 1950. Following this he studied piano with Yvonne Hubert and music theory with Gabriel Cusson. A grant from the Government of Quebec enabled him to go to Paris to study organ with André Marchal in 1954-1955. This was followed by mentorship from organist Anton Heiller and studies in harpsichord with Isolde Ahlgrimm and Eta Harich-Schneider in 1956 in Vienna. He also studied harpsichord with Ruggero Gerlin.

Lagacé joined the faculty of the Conservatoire de musique du Québec à Montréal upon his return to Canada in 1957. He left his position there in 1978 to join the music faculty of Concordia University where he taught for many years. He spent his summers teaching on the faculty of the Canadian Amateur Musicians/Musiciens Amateurs du Canada, and was a guest lecturer and instructor at several conservatories and organ schools in Europe. In 1960 he was a founding member of the Ars Organi; a group dedicated to presenting concerts of organ music. He was the longtime organist at Sanctuaire Marie-Reine-des-Coeurs in Montreal where he began his post in 1966.

His two series of recitals covering the works of Johann Sebastian Bach are considered to be landmark events in the history of music in Montreal.

Lagacé died on 11 February 2025, at the age of 94.

== Discography ==
- 11 Chorals op. 122 et Fugue en la bémol mineur (1978)
- Tabulatura Nova III (1980)
- Orgelbüchlein (1991)
- Chorals de Leipzig (1991)
- Musique allemande du 17e siècle (1991)
- Golberg Variations (1995)
- The Art of Fugue
