= Prix du Québec =

- Awarded for: cultural and scientific achievements
- Sponsored by: Government of Quebec
- Location: Quebec City
- Country: Canada
- First award: 1977
- Website: http://www.prixduquebec.gouv.qc.ca/

The Prix du Québec (French pronunciation: [pʁi dy kebɛk]) are awards given by the Government of Quebec to individuals for cultural and scientific achievements. Founded in 1977, the government annually awards ten awards in the cultural field and eight in the scientific field.

== Cultural awards ==
- Prix Albert-Tessier, for cinema
- Prix Athanase-David, for literature
- Prix Denise-Filiatrault, for theatre arts
- Prix Denise-Pelletier, for acting
- Prix Ernest-Cormier, for architecture and design
- Prix Georges-Émile-Lapalme, for the French language
- Prix Gérard-Morisset, for a career in archives, museology and popular culture
- Prix Guy-Mauffette, for radio and television arts
- Prix Paul-Émile-Borduas, for visual arts and applied arts
- Prix René-Lévesque, for journalism

== Scientific awards ==
- Prix Armand-Frappier, for scientific research and education
- Prix Hubert-Reeves
- Prix Léon-Gérin, for human and social sciences
- Prix Lionel-Boulet, for innovation leading to economic growth
- Prix Lise-Watier
- Prix Marie-Andrée-Bertrand, for innovation in social sciences leading to collective well-being
- Prix Marie-Victorin, for natural sciences
- Prix Wilder-Penfield, for biology, medicine and engineering

== See also ==
- National Order of Quebec
- List of Canadian awards
