= Jean-Duceppe Company =

Theatre company

- Compagnie Jean-Duceppe
- Formation: 1973
- Founder: Jean Duceppe
- Purpose: Theatre company
- Headquarters: Place des Arts, Montreal
- Artistic Director: David Laurin and Jean-Simon Traversy
- Website: https://duceppe.com/

The Jean-Duceppe Company (Compagnie Jean-Duceppe) is a Canadian theatre company based in Place des Arts, Montreal.

== History ==
The company was founded by actor Jean Duceppe in 1973. The company featured a large repertoire of artists from both French Canada and North America as a whole. The company was initially very successful, and introduced several Quebecois playwrights to a larger audience. Marcel Dubé was a favorite of Jean Duceppe, who ran over a dozen of his plays at the theatre company. Over time, the company increasingly featured local writers, and its 1997-1998 lineup was exclusively made up of local playwrights.

Jean Duceppe was the artistic director of the company until his death in 1990. Michel Dumont was artistic director from 1991 until 2018, when David Laurin and Jean-Simon Traversy became the company's artistic directors.
