= Indian Rights for Indian Women =

Grassroots activist collective in Canada

Indian Rights for Indian Women (IRIW) was a grassroots activist collective in Canada, formed in 1967, that advocated against the gender discrimination in the Indian Act. The group's primary goal was to eradicate Section 12, paragraph 1(b) of the Indian Act, which removed the Indian status of Indigenous women who married non-Indigenous men and prohibited them from passing status onto their children. Among others, the group was founded by Mary Two-Axe Earley, Kathleen Steinhauer and Nellie Carlson. IRIW used the voices of many Indigenous women who had lost their status across Canada to protest and stand up to the government. Due to their activism, Bill C-31, an amendment to the Indian Act, was implemented in 1985. Bill C-31 protected the status of Indian women and brought the Indian Act more in line with the increasing gender equality of the time.

== History ==
=== History of Legislation on Indian Women's Status ===
Although political and governance systems varied across different First Nations, many are matrilineal societies. In others, men were the leaders, and men and women had different roles in society but they were considered equals. With the Indian Act, women lost numerous rights. For example, they lost their equality, as the Indian Act is paternalistic. They lost many of their traditional rights and roles and they lost the right to own property.

Part of the way the Government of Canada legislated Indigenous populations was by assigning Indian status. When assigning status, the Government of Canada disregarded Indigenous systems that were already in place for determining identity and instead used a patrilineal system. This means status was passed down through men. Before total enfranchisement, Indigenous women who married non-Indigenous men did not lose their status. Instead, they kept their status but were labelled as “red ticket holders.” Having this distinction meant that these women were still legal Indians, but they lost all right associated with being Indian, such as having the power to advocate for their rights on the reserve. The concept of status being taken away was first seen in 1869, with the Gradual Enfranchisement Act. For an Indigenous woman to maintain status, she had to marry an Indigenous man. If a non-Indigenous woman married an Indigenous man, she would be designated with Indian status. If an Indigenous woman married a non-Indigenous man, she lost her Indian status, and so did her children. Another example of gender discrimination seen in the Indian Act can be seen with the “double mother” clause. If the child's grandmother on their dad's side, and if their mother only received status from marrying an Indian, they would lose their status at the age of 21. The loss of status led to an imbalance between those with power and those without, which divided itself along gender lines. Indigenous women subject to these gender discriminatory rules set out by the Indian Act had to relocate from the reserve, lost all their rights, and lost their band membership.

=== Background of Indian Rights for Indian Women ===
Women's rights movements started to become more relevant and popular in the 1960s and 1970s. Increased activism in Canada was partly in response to government actions, such as the Royal Commission on the Status of Women and the 1969 White Paper. Internationally, the Women's Liberation Movement began to gain ground in the 60s. There was a notable court case proceeding in Canada at this time as well, as Jeanette Corbière Lavell had brought an action against the Canadian government for discrimination under the Indian Act, after she had lost her status for marrying a non-Indigenous man. Around this time, Indian women in Canada took advantage of the trend of activism and started to collectivize in the fight for their rights.

Before the solidification of the group known as Indian Rights for Indian Women, there were regional political activist groups that preceded it. One of these was a group called Equal Rights for Indian Women, which was formed in 1967 by Mohawk activist Mary Two-Axe Earley in Quebec. Likewise, Nellie Carlson and Kathleen Steinhauer founded a group in Alberta for the particular purpose of combating the discriminatory Indian Act, calling themselves the Ad Hoc Committee on Indian Women's Rights in the early days. Another contributing group was Voice of Alberta Indian Women.

Formerly Nellie Makokis, Nellie Carlson married Elmer Carlson in 1947. The government revised the Indian Act in 1951, ruling that women who married non-Indian men, and their children, were no longer status Indians, and could not live on reserve. Similarly, when Mary Two-Axe Earley married an Irish-American electrical engineer in New York, she lost her Indian Status. Earley held a fellow Mohawk woman named Florence in her arms as she died, and believed her cause of death to have been the stress of losing her status and being ordered to sell her house and leave the reserve. Additionally, after her marriage to Gordon Margetts in 1960, Jenny Shirts Margetts lost her treaty rights and status to Saddle Lake Cree Nation. The effects of the Indian Act on these women would act as motivation for their founding of the Indian Rights for Indian Women group.

=== Founding ===
Prior Indian women's rights groups coalesced and resulted in the formation of Indian Rights for Indian Women in 1967. In the late 1960s, Kathleen Steinhauer wrote to several other women who she thought might be opposed to Section 12(I)(b) of the Indian Act. She contacted Jeannette Corbière Lavell, Jean Cuthand and Mary Small Face Marule to gauge their support. She describes a meeting resulting from these messages as follows:

Then one day Marie rang up and said: "Call your women together. I'm coming to Edmonton." So I called Nellie and Nellie phoned Jenny Margetts and Myrtle Calahasen. We met here, and sat around this table. Gordon Margetts, Jenny's husband, was here. Some guys came here to listen. Marie was very supportive. She got us started. "This is what you must do," she said. She wrote it all down for us, the legal resolutions, all of it. And we were off.

— Kathleen Steinhauer, describing an early meeting, pg. 60

A meeting of the Voice of Alberta Indian Women group was held in Saskatoon in March 1968. In attendance were all of the founders except for Nellie Carlson, who had pneumonia: Steinhauer, Earley, Lavell, Marule, Margetts, and Monica Turner, who went on to become the group's first Eastern president.

Earley and Margetts took on the roles of co-presidents immediately. The Alberta end of the organization, consisting primarily of Carlson, Margetts and Steinhauer, began to work with leading male Indigenous activists to foreground the issue of gender discrimination. Marie Small Face Marule, mentioned in the quote from Steinhauer above, was the executive director of the National Indian Brotherhood when Steinhauer wrote to her, and became an integral member of the group in the early days.

== Goals ==
The primary goal of Indian Rights for Indian Women was always to end Section 12 (I)(b) of the Indian Act, the section that mandated the loss of Indian status for women who married non-Indian men.

Subsidiary goals of the group included obtaining the rightful Indian Band assets that the government stripped from them through the Indian Act.

The group faced pressure from national women's groups, including the Native Women's Association of Canada, to expand their focus to other important issues, such as foster care. However, the group remained steadfastly focused on Section 12(I)(b) of the Indian Act.

== Challenges ==
Indian Rights for Indian Women often faced opposition. As Kathleen Steinhauer stated, "A lot of our difficulties were within our own communities, from our own people." Some felt as though changing the section on gender and marriage in the Indian Act would make the treaties invalid or even destroy them, and that the reserve lands would be taken away as a result of the group's advocacy. The group faced opposition from its very inception, and only survived due to the determination of its founders. A major source of opposition came from women who had married into band membership. According to the Steinhauer, at the time, these women felt threatened by the advocacy of the women who had married out of their band membership. Many well known Cree women were against them in the early days, including Agnes Bull and Helen Gladue.

Nellie Carlson cites opposition from the women's own families and close friends. Her own grandparents, and band councillors on her reserve, punished her for speaking out. The women often faced aggressive opposition, especially from Indigenous men, who referred to them as "squaw libbers". Kathleen Steinhauer cited opposition to the goals of Indian Rights for Indian Women from her own parents.

Another significant challenge the group faced was funding. Since IRIW was a collective made up of non-status Indigenous women, the government did not fund them like other Indian organizations. Much of their funding was regularly in jeopardy as a result of concerns that the finances were not being handled well. In the early days, the group didn't have much money for lobbying, conferences, or significant organizing. What the group did have came mainly from family allowance cheques from the government. Long-distance phone calls fell to Nellie Carlson, who received money from her husband to do so.

== Achievements ==
A large achievement of Indian Rights for Indian Women was that this was a national activist group that fought for rights for nearly 20 years. Important protests took place in the late 1970s and early 1980s. In 1977, Bill C-25 was passed in the House of Commons and sent to the Senate for review. This proposed bill had the intention of amending the Indian Act but made no reference to marital or gender discrimination. Due to the strong condemning of this bill to the committees reviewing it, IRIW gained support from those, especially women, in Parliament. Their protesting gained significant attention nationally and also from government members, such as Gordon Fairweather, the Human Rights Commissioner, who publicly voiced their support that the Indian Act needed to be amended.

Along with protesting, IRIW drafted a policy paper during a large conference in Alberta 1978. This paper discussed ways to define an Indian using a quarter blood-quantum, as this would be gender-neutral. It also proposed giving back status to the women who became enfranchised as well as all the Indian rights they lost.

An almost-success can be seen with Bill C-47, which was introduced by the Liberals and was intended as a non-discriminatory amendment to the Indian Act. This was the first attempt at a change to the Indian Act that would have taken gender discrimination into account. This is a success as the protesting and hard work of IRIW led to the acknowledgement of the discrimination Indigenous women faced, and a concrete step taken by the government in attempting to fix it. However, once the bill reached senate, it was voted against.

Despite this first loss with Bill C-47, in 1985, a major achievement was made as the government passed Bill C-31. This bill included an amendment to section 12(I)(b) of the Indian Act to eliminate gender discrimination. With this new legislation, women who lost their status, and their children, were allowed to re-obtain it, and from then on, women would not lose their status if they married a non-Indigenous man. Non-Indigenous women would also no longer gain status if they married an Indian man. Also, although the government was still in control of the legal status of Indians, Bill C-31 allowed band-membership to be controlled by the First Nations bands. Additionally, Bill C-31 outlined the different types of status, which are 6(1), in which both parents of the person are status Indians, and 6(2), in which only one parent has status.

== Outcomes ==
One of the main outcomes of IRIW's activism and advocacy, which is the creation of Bill C-31, led to more than 100 000 women and their children to either get their status back or be given status.

Although Indian Rights for Indian Women fought for rights for Indigenous women, and the group played a big role in the implementation of Bill C-31, another outcome is that gender discrimination in the Indian Act did not stop despite the group's efforts. With this legislation, a new concept was created, called the 'second generation cut-off,' which was supposed to be non-discriminatory based on gender. In this cut-off, if two consecutive generations of status Indians, no matter what gender, married a non-status Indian, the third generation, or the grandchild, would not have status. This still included gender discrimination as the children of a woman who regained status after Bill C-31 would have 6(2) status, meaning that they would not be able to pass on their status to their children. For men, their children would have 6(1) status, meaning that their grandchildren would also have either 6(1) status, or 6(2) status, as the men never lost their status before 1985, and their wives gained status even if they were not Indigenous.

Also, with bands being able to control their own membership, IRIW feared that although there was less legal gender discrimination, that women would be discriminated against within their own bands, as the bands would be able to decide who has band membership and rights.
