= Jean Duceppe =

Canadian actor

Jean Duceppe CQ
- Born: Jean Hotte-Duceppe; 25 October 1923; Montreal, Quebec, Canada
- Died: 7 December 1990 (aged 67); Montreal, Quebec, Canada
- Occupation: Actor
- Political party: New Democratic Party
- Spouse: Hélène Rowley Hotte
- Children: Gilles Duceppe; Louise Duceppe; Monique Duceppe; et al.

Jean Hotte-Duceppe (Note: French pronunciation: [ʒɑ̃ ɔt dysɛp].) CQ (25 October 1923 – 7 December 1990) was a Canadian stage and television actor from Montreal, Quebec.

== Early life and education ==
Born on 25 October 1923 to a family of local shopkeepers in working-class Montreal, Jean Duceppe came to the theatre with no formal training and was completely self-taught.

== Career ==
Duceppe began performing at the Arcade, seven days a week. Between 1941 and 1947, he performed in 34 different plays. He appeared in over 160 productions on radio, on television, and in films.

He hosted radio shows and collaborated on numerous radio and TV series, including the first one broadcast on 3 August 1952, on SRC, Le Seigneur de Brinqueville. From 1953 to 1959, he started in La famille Plouffe.

Some of his greatest successes included his portrayals of Willy Loman in La Mort d'un commis-voyageur (Death of a Salesman) and Premier Maurice Duplessis in Charbonneau et le chef (Charbonneau and the Chief).

In 1973, he founded the Compagnie de théâtre Jean Duceppe (Jean-Duceppe Company).

== Views ==
Duceppe supported the "yes" option in the first Quebec sovereignty referendum in 1980. One of his sons is Canadian politician Gilles Duceppe, a supporter of the independence of Quebec from Canada and a former leader of the Bloc Québécois.

== Recognition ==
Duceppe received numerous awards and honours throughout his career.

In 1957, he was named Performer of the Year.

In 1968, he received the Prix Victor-Morin from the Société Saint-Jean-Baptiste.

In 1971, he won an Etrog from the Canadian Film Awards for Best Performance By Lead Actor for his role in the film Mon oncle Antoine.

In 1978, for his outstanding contribution to theatre, he was awarded the Molson Prize from the Canada Council.

In 1979, he won the Prix Marc-Lescarbot as well as the Prix Denise-Pelletier, awarded by the Minister of Cultural Affairs of the Government of Quebec.

In 1985, he was made a Knight of the National Order of Quebec.

In 1987, he became an inductee of the Academy of Great Montrealers in the Cultural category.

In 2016, he was made a Commander of the Order of Montreal.

== Death ==
He died at the age of 67 on 7 December 1990.

== Notes ==
Awards
Preceded by Paul Bradley	Canadian Film Award for Best Actor; 1971	Succeeded by Gordon Pinsent
Preceded by Doug McGrath	Canadian Film Award for Best Actor; 1971	Succeeded by Gordon Pinsent
Preceded by Bernard Lagacé	Prix Denise-Pelletier; 1979	Succeeded by Ludmilla Chiriaeff
