= Mary Two-Axe Earley =

Canadian Mohawk and Oneida women's rights activist

Mary Two-Axe Earley OQ
- Two-Axe Earley, c. 1970s
- Born: Mary Two-Axe; October 4, 1911; Kahnawake, Quebec, Canada
- Died: August 21, 1996 (aged 84)
- Resting place: Kahnawake
- Occupation: Women's rights activist
- Years active: 1967–1996
- Known for: Successfully leading the fight against legal gender discrimination in the Indian Act
- Spouse: Edward Earley (m. 1938; died 1969)
- Children: 2
- Honours: Governor General's Persons Case Award (1979); National Aboriginal Achievement Award (1996)

Mary Two-Axe Earley (Note: Alternatively spelled in some sources as "Early".) OQ (born Mary Two-Axe; October 4, 1911 – August 21, 1996) was a Canadian Mohawk and Oneida women's rights activist from the reserve of Kahnawake in Quebec. After losing her legal Indian status due to marrying a non-status man, Two-Axe Earley advocated for changes to the Indian Act, which had promoted gender discrimination and stripped First Nations women of the right to participate in the political and cultural life of their home reserves.

In 1967, Two-Axe Earley helped establish the Equal Rights for Indian Women organization and led the submission of a brief to the Royal Commission on the Status of Women. In 1974, she co-founded the Québec Native Women's Association, and the following year she received national and international attention at the International Women's Year conference in Mexico when she publicly fought back against her band council's attempts to formally evict her from Kahnawake.

On June 28, 1985, the Canadian Parliament passed Bill C-31 to amend the Indian Act, eliminating the Act's original gender discrimination and creating a new process of reinstatement for affected First Nations women to have their Indian status restored. Two-Axe Earley became the first woman to have her status restored, and thousands of other First Nations women and their descendants were granted the same opportunity to regain their lost legal and cultural identity under Canadian law. The NFB released the film on her fight for equality, Mary Two-Axe Earley: I Am Indian Again, in 2021.

== Early life ==
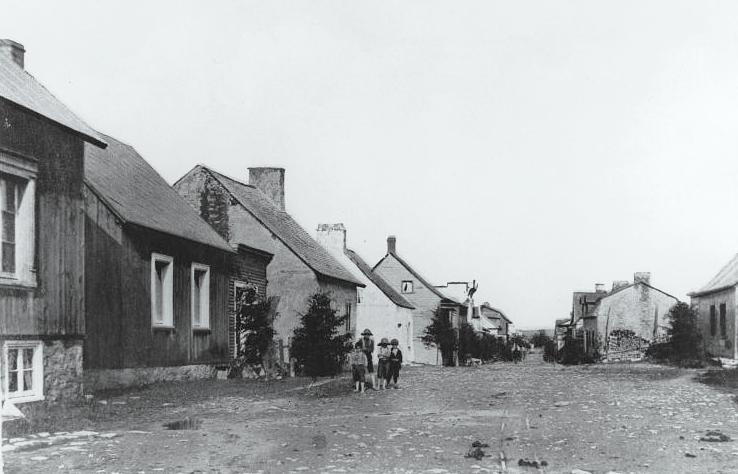
The Kahnawake reserve in 1910

Mary Two-Axe was born on October 4, 1911, on the Mohawk reserve of Kahnawake (then known as Caughnawaga). Her father, Dominic Onenhariio Two-Axe, was a Mohawk, while her mother, Juliet Smith, was an Oneida nurse and teacher. When Mary Two-Axe was 10 years old, her mother died of Spanish influenza while treating young flu patients in North Dakota, and Two-Axe spent the rest of her childhood with her grandparents at Kahnawake.

When Two-Axe was 18, she moved to Brooklyn, New York in search of work. She married an Irish-American electrical engineer named Edward Earley in 1938, and they had two children: Edward and Rosemary. The family visited Kahnawake every summer.

== Activism ==
=== Background ===
Because Mary Two-Axe Earley had married a "non-status" man – a man who had no legal Indian status under Canadian law – she was consequently stripped of her own Indian status. The Indian Act, drawn from Victorian-era European notions around gender and power, treated First Nations men and women unequally: although a man could marry a non-status woman and still retain his own legal Indian status under the Act, the same was not true for a woman who married a non-status man. When Two-Axe Earley had married Edward Earley, she had lost her Indian status and rights: she was prohibited from owning land on the Kahnawake reserve, participating in reserve elections, or even being buried in the reserve cemeteries – and she could not pass these rights down to her children, either.

During the early years of her marriage, Two-Axe Earley did not have strong feelings about the loss of her status, as she was living a happy life with her husband and children. Over time, however, she saw the emotional impacts of the discriminatory law on her female friends. In 1966, one friend – a fellow Mohawk – died of a heart attack in Two-Axe Earley's arms. The woman had been forced to move out of Kahnawake, her home taken away because of the Indian Act, and Two-Axe Earley was convinced that the intense stress of these losses had contributed to her friend's death.

=== Fight for change ===
Deeply impacted by the loss of her friend, Two-Axe Earley began campaigning across Canada to call attention to the issue. In 1967, she founded the provincial Equal Rights for Indian Women Association (later Indian Rights for Indian Women), which grew to become a national organization. After contacting Senator Thérèse Casgrain – a known advocate for women's rights – Two-Axe Earley was encouraged to submit a brief to the Royal Commission on the Status of Women. Despite pressure from members of the Kahnawake reserve who wanted her to stop campaigning, she led a group of 30 Mohawk women to speak before the Commission, and the Commission subsequently made a formal recommendation that the Indian Act be amended so that all First Nations people "should enjoy the same rights and privileges in matters of marriage and property as other Canadians," regardless of gender.

Two-Axe Earley was faced with heavy opposition from male First Nations leaders during her work. Some suggested that changing the Indian Act to restore lost status and rights to women and their children – allowing them to return to their original communities – would put too much financial strain on First Nations reserves. Some also expressed fears that permitting First Nations women to marry non-Indigenous men without penalty could result in the gradual erosion of Indigenous culture and autonomy in Canada.

In 1969, Two-Axe Earley's husband died, and she decided to move back to her old community in Quebec. Although Two-Axe Earley had inherited a house on the Kahnawake reserve from her grandmother, she was told that she was no longer welcome to live there. She found a way around the rules by gifting the house to her daughter, who had regained Indian status after marrying a Mohawk man from the reserve. Only permitted to live there through this loophole, Two-Axe Earley described herself as "a guest in my own house".

Two-Axe Earley co-founded the Québec Native Women's Association in 1974. The following year, alongside 60 other women originally from the Kahnawake reserve, she attended the International Women's Year Conference in Mexico as a member of the Canadian delegation. While at the conference, she learned that the band council had taken advantage of her absence from Kahnawake to use the Indian Act to formally evict her. Two-Axe Earley used her platform at the conference to publicize her situation, subsequently receiving national and international attention, and the eviction notice served by Kahnawake was subsequently withdrawn. In 1976, she was elected to the newly-formed Board of Directors for the Canadian Research Institute for the Advancement of Women.

At a first ministers conference in 1982, Two-Axe Earley sought a formal timeslot to speak about her cause but was denied permission. When he heard, Quebec Premier René Lévesque provided his support by offering her his seat instead. The Canadian Charter of Rights and Freedoms was signed into law later that year, and the cause of Indigenous gender equality subsequently gained additional momentum.

On June 28, 1985, the Canadian Parliament passed Bill C-31 to amend the Indian Act. The Bill removed the legal gender discrimination that had impacted Indigenous women in their choice of husband, and allowed women who had been stripped of their Indian status to regain it through a process of reinstatement. Two-Axe Earley was the first woman to have her status reinstated by Indian Affairs Minister David Crombie.

=== Aftermath ===
The changed legislation made it possible for 16,000 other First Nations women and 46,000 descendants to regain their lost Indian status. Among these people, nearly 2,000 women became eligible to return to Kahnawake, an influx that prompted new community discussion – at times divisive – around membership eligibility and use of resources.

Some reserves simply continued refusing to allow women to return, despite their restored legal status. In 1993, several First Nations groups brought their opposition to court, arguing that the Federal government did not have the right to influence who was eligible for band membership. In December of that year, despite health problems, 82-year-old Two-Axe Earley provided her personal testimony to the court case as a witness for the Native Council of Canada, describing the negative impact of the old Indian Act on First Nations Women. The court decided that Bill C-31 would stand.

== Awards and honours ==
In 1979, for her contributions to women's rights and gender equality, Two-Axe Earley received the Governor General's Persons Case Award. In 1981, she was awarded an Honorary Doctorate of Law from York University. In 1985, she was inducted into the Order of Quebec as an Officer.

Two-Axe Earley was a joint recipient of the 1990 Robert S. Litvack Award from McGill University in recognition of her contributions to "the defense of the rule of law and the protection of the individual against arbitrary power." Her co-recipients that year were fellow First Nations activists Jeanette Lavell and Sandra Lovelace. In 1996, Two-Axe Earley received a National Aboriginal Achievement Award for her work towards the passing of Bill C-31.

On June 28, 2021, a Google Doodle was featured celebrating her on the thirty-sixth anniversary of the Indian Act's amendment.

On September 9, 2025, the Société de transport de Montréal and the Mayor of Montreal, Valérie Plante, announced that one of the new stations on the Blue Line extension of the Montreal Metro would bear her name. The name of Mary Two-Axe Earley had first been added in 2016 to Montreal's Toponym'Elles database by linguist Gabriel Martin, who compiled a list of 375 women to include in the city's toponymy, and was later selected by a toponymy committee in 2019 for a future Metro station.

In 2025, Two-Axe Earley was designated a National Historic Person under Canada's Historic Sites and Monuments Act.

== Death ==
Two-Axe Earley continued living at Kahnawake for the rest of her life. On August 21, 1996, she died from respiratory failure, aged 84. She was buried in the Catholic cemetery of the Kahnawake reserve – a personal wish made possible by the legal changes she had enabled.
