= Théâtre du Nouveau Monde =

Canadian theatre company and venue

Coordinates: 45°30′31.5″N 73°33′52″W

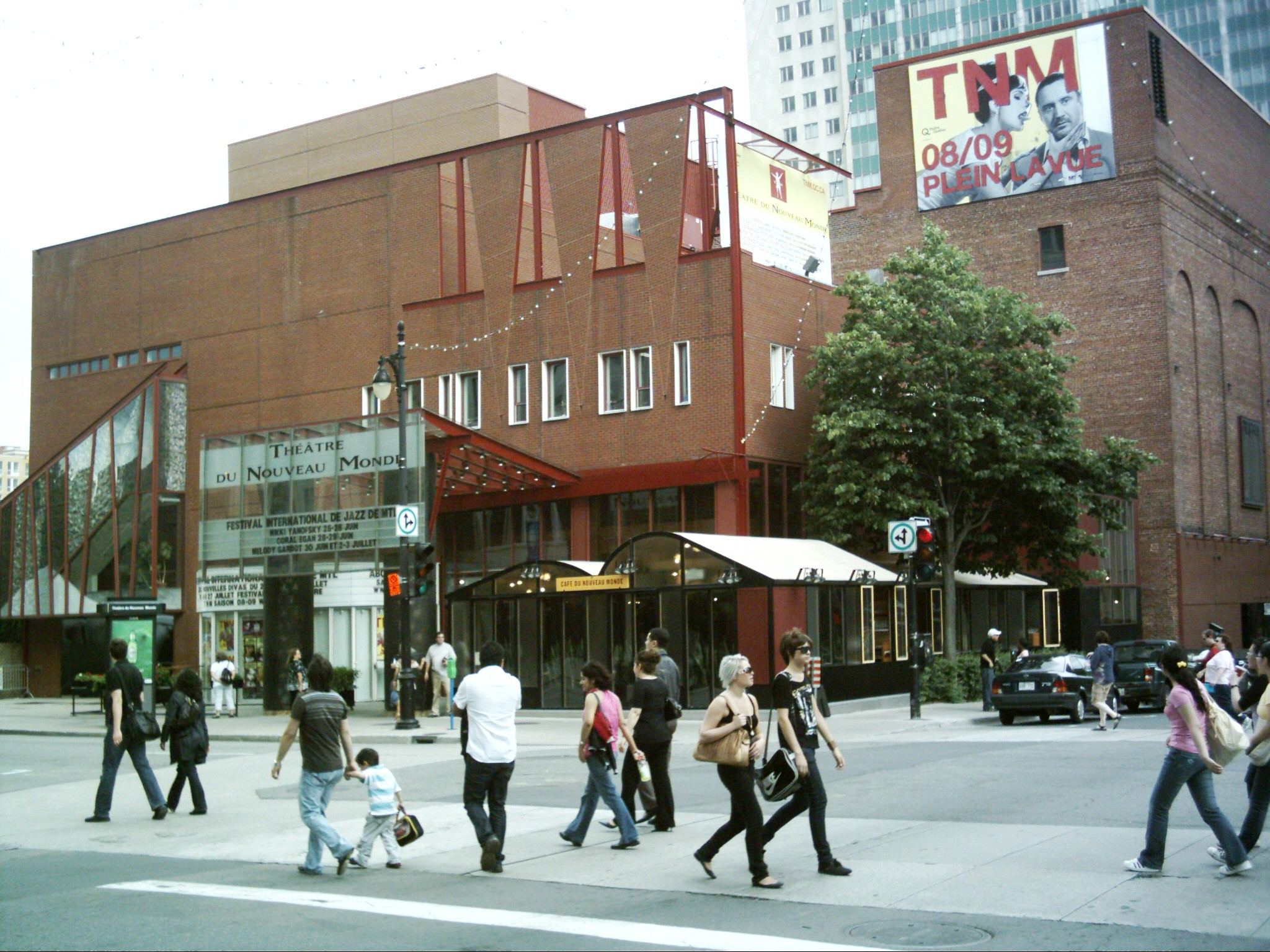
The Théâtre du Nouveau Monde on 84 rue Sainte-Catherine Ouest in Montréal.

The Théâtre du Nouveau Monde (French pronunciation: [teɑtʁ dy nuvo mɔ̃d]; TNM) is a theatre company and venue located on rue Sainte-Catherine in Montreal, Quebec. Founded in 1951, it launched with the classic play L'Avare by Molière.

Initially located at the Gesù (1951–1958), it subsequently moved to the Orpheum, then after 1966 it transferred to the salle Port-Royal at Place des Arts and remained there until 1972.

In 1972, the TNM bought the building where the Gayety Theatre and later the Théâtre de la Comédie-Canadienne once performed. The building was renovated in 1997 by Montreal architect Dan Hanganu.

== Founders ==
- Jean-Louis Roux
- Jean Gascon
- Guy Hoffmann
- Georges Groulx
- Robert Gadouas
- Éloi de Grandmont

== Directors ==
- Jean Gascon (1951–1966)
- Jean-Louis Roux (1966–1982)
- André Pagé (1981)
- Olivier Reichenbach (1982–1992)
- Lorraine Pintal (1992-)

== See also ==
- Théâtre du Rideau Vert
- Compagnons de Saint-Laurent
