= Jean Gascon =

Canadian opera director, actor, and administrator

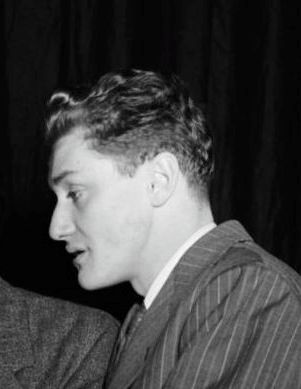
- Radio Carabin, 1945
- Born: December 21, 1920; Montreal, Quebec
- Died: April 13, 1988 (aged 67); Stratford, Ontario
- Resting place: Notre Dame des Neiges Cemetery

Jean Gascon CC (December 21, 1920 – April 13, 1988) was a Canadian opera director, actor, and administrator.

== Career ==
Originally bent on a career in medicine, Gascon abandoned it for the stage after considerable work with amateur groups in Montreal. A scholarship in 1946 from the Government of France enabled him to study dramatic art in Paris. He studied with Ludmilla Pitoëff.

After returning to Canada in 1951, he co-founded Montreal's Theatre du Nouveau Monde and became its first Artistic Director. During this time, he also started a long association with the newly established Stratford Festival in 1956, playing the Constable of France in Henry V and directing three farces by Moliere. He returned to Stratford to direct Le malade imaginaire in 1958 and Othello in 1959.

Between 1960 and 1963, he was founding Administrative Director of the National Theatre School of Canada and was awarded the Canadian Drama Award, the Prix Victor Dore.

In 1963 he returned to Stratford to direct The Comedy of Errors, and then Le Bourgeois gentilhomme and The Marriage of Figaro the following season. He was awarded the Molson Prize in 1967. Then between 1968 and 1974, he was artistic director of Stratford Festival of Canada. In 1977 he became theatre director of the National Arts Centre in Ottawa.

Gascon's career in the Canadian theatre as a bilingual actor and director achieved an impressive reputation. He gained honorary degrees from McGill and Bishop's Universities. He was also awarded the Order of Canada (in 1975), the Prix du Québec and the Royal Bank Award.

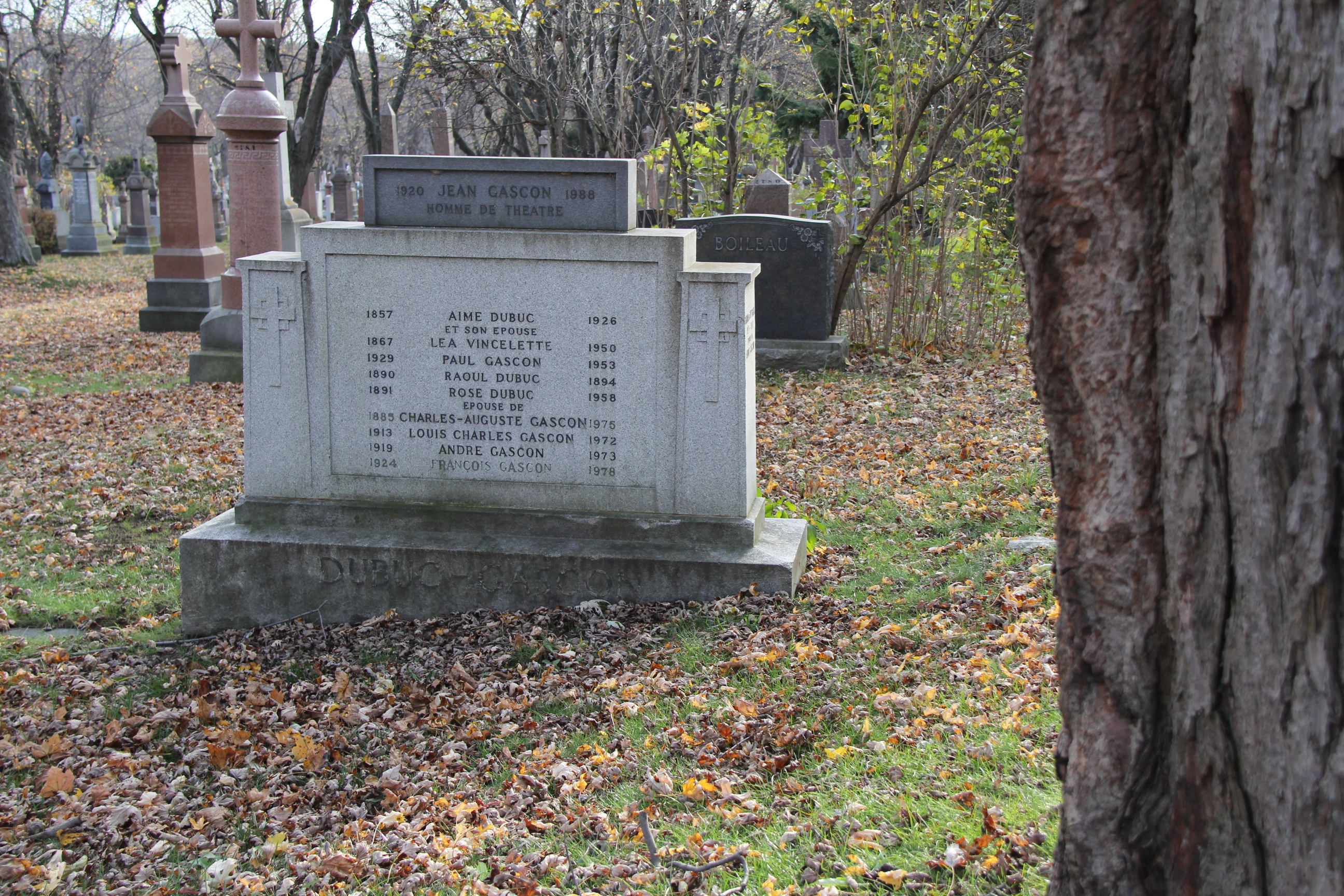
Gascon's tombstone in the Notre Dame des Neiges Cemetery.

As an actor in both English and French languages, his credits include such noteworthy portrayals as Richard in Richard II, and the Captain in Dance of Death.

He was the French/Indian Batise in the 1970 movie A Man Called Horse and was in a film in 1988 called À corps perdu (Straight for the Heart).

== Personal life ==
He was the brother of actor Gabriel Gascon and filmmaker Gilles Gascon.

Gascon died of a heart attack in 1988 in Stratford, Ontario and was entombed at the Notre Dame des Neiges Cemetery in Montreal.

== Filmography ==
Year	Title	Role	Notes
1970	A Man Called Horse	Batise	
1976	The Absence (L'Absence)	Paul	
1980	Cordélia	Juge Wurtele	
1980	The Lucky Star	The Priest	
1988	Straight for the Heart (À corps perdu)		(final film role)

== Honours ==
- In 1967, he was made an Officer of the Order of Canada and was promoted to Companion in 1975.
- In 1985, he was awarded the Quebec government's Prix Denise-Pelletier.
