= Jean-Louis Roux =

Canadian politician, entertainer and playwright

The Honourable Jean-Louis Roux CC CQ

26th Lieutenant Governor of Quebec
- In office August 8, 1996 – January 30, 1997
- Monarch: Elizabeth II
- Governor General: Roméo LeBlanc
- Premier: Lucien Bouchard
- Preceded by: Martial Asselin
- Succeeded by: Lise Thibault

Senator for Mille Isles, Quebec
- In office August 31, 1994 – August 8, 1996
- Appointed by: Jean Chrétien
- Preceded by: Solange Chaput-Rolland
- Succeeded by: Léonce Mercier

Personal details
- Born: May 18, 1923 Montreal, Quebec
- Died: November 28, 2013 (aged 90) Montreal, Quebec
- Spouse: Monique Oligny (m. 1950)
- Education: Université de Montréal
- Profession: Playwright, entertainer, politician

Jean-Louis Roux CC CQ (May 18, 1923 – November 28, 2013) was a Canadian politician, entertainer and playwright who was briefly the 26th Lieutenant Governor of Quebec.

== Biography ==
Born in Montreal, Quebec, Roux originally studied medicine at the Université de Montréal, but gave it up to pursue acting. After travelling and performing in New York City and Paris he returned to Montreal and helped create the Théâtre du Nouveau Monde and became a frequent actor in and director of its productions for several years. He also turned to writing and wrote successful plays, radio dramas, and television shows.

Roux's greatest fame comes from his role on La famille Plouffe, a very successful Quebec situation comedy. He served as President of the Canadian Conference of the Arts from 1968 to 1970.

In 1971, Roux was made an Officer of the Order of Canada and was promoted to Companion in 1987. In 1989, he was made a Knight of the National Order of Quebec. Roux received a Governor General's Performing Arts Award for his lifetime contributions to Canadian theatre in 2004.

== Public life and L’Affaire Jean-Louis Roux ==
A staunch federalist, Jean-Louis Roux was appointed to the Senate by his longtime friend Canadian Prime Minister Jean Chrétien in 1994. During the 1995 Quebec referendum campaign, Roux was arguably the best-known personality in the area of art and culture to campaign for "No." His public statement that Quebec intellectuals should not remain passively on the sidelines, unlike intellectuals during the rise of Nazism in Germany, provoked an uproar.

The following year, Chrétien appointed him as the new lieutenant governor of Quebec, a move that was seen as provocative by many since it was customary to appoint for that ceremonial function uncontroversial figures who had not been politically active for a long time, ever. He resigned abruptly, only two months into his five-year mandate shortly after the publication of a cover story, L'Affaire Jean-Louis Roux, in the magazine L'Actualité on 1 November 1996. Adding to what former federal cabinet minister Gérard Pelletier had already disclosed to L'Actualité journalist Luc Chartrand regarding Roux, his longtime friend, having drawn a swastika on the sleeve of this lab coat during his World War II medical school days, Roux revealed during his pre-publication interview with Chartrand that he had taken part and even been once in the front line of anti-conscription protests in 1942 during which the windows of stores with Jewish-sounding names and the anglophone newspaper The Montreal Gazette had been smashed. Also, he held pro-Mussolini, pro-Franco and pro-Pétain sympathies during those years. (Note: Wondering why Roux had come up with embarrassing details about his medical student past at the very beginning of the interview without being asked, Chartrand speculated that by making these revelations himself, he was hoping to nip in the bud any potential revelations by others with the aim of damaging his reputation. It was a course of action that Chartrand thought might have been decided during a private soirée given a few days earlier in honour of the new lieutenant-governor by old friends, including Gérard Pelletier and former Prime Minister Pierre-Elliot Trudeau. (Chartrand, p. 20))

There were soon increasing calls coming from all quarters for him to resign as lieutenant governor, which occurred on 5 November. Chrétien angrily accused "the separatists" of having engineered the whole thing to discredit a man of honour, but Roux himself did not support that accusation, and it was generally agreed that Pelletier's swastika leak during the L’Actualité interview that was at the origin of the scandal.

Roux tearfully told a news conference the day after his resignation that "the carefree attitude of youth may be an explanation, but it can't in any way serve as an excuse and especially not as a justification; I committed a mistake by yielding to the anti-Semitic feelings that poisoned our minds at the time."

== Chair of the Canada Council ==
On May 31, 1997, Roux returned to public life when the federal government appointed him to be chair of the Canada Council.

Roux died in Montreal on November 28, 2013.

== Filmography ==
- La famille Plouffe (1953)
- Adventures in Rainbow Country (1969)
- The Pyx (1973)
- Duplessis (1978)
- Two Solitudes (1978)
- Riel (1979)
- Chocolate Eclair (Éclair au chocolat) (1979)
- Cordélia (1980)
- The Hotel New Hampshire (1984)
- The Revolving Doors (Les portes tournantes) (1988)
- Salut Victor (1989)
- My Friend Max (Mon amie Max) (1994)
- Black List (Liste noire) (1995)
- The Third Miracle (1999)
- The Courage to Love (2000)
- Battle of the Brave (Nouvelle-France) (2004)
- C.R.A.Z.Y. (2005)

== Coat of arms ==
Coat of arms of Jean-Louis Roux
Notes The arms of Jean-Louis Roux consist of: Crest A secretary bird (Sagittarius serpentarius) proper holding in its dexter claw an open book Argent bound Gules, standing on a rock set with grass proper. Escutcheon Gules in chief the masks of comedy and tragedy, in base a neutral mask Argent. Supporters Two grey wolves howling. Compartment A grassy compartment set with snow-capped mountains and pine trees proper. Motto Aider Autrui (To Help Others)

== See also ==
- List of lieutenant governors of Quebec
- Timeline of Quebec history
