= Georges Groulx =

Canadian actor

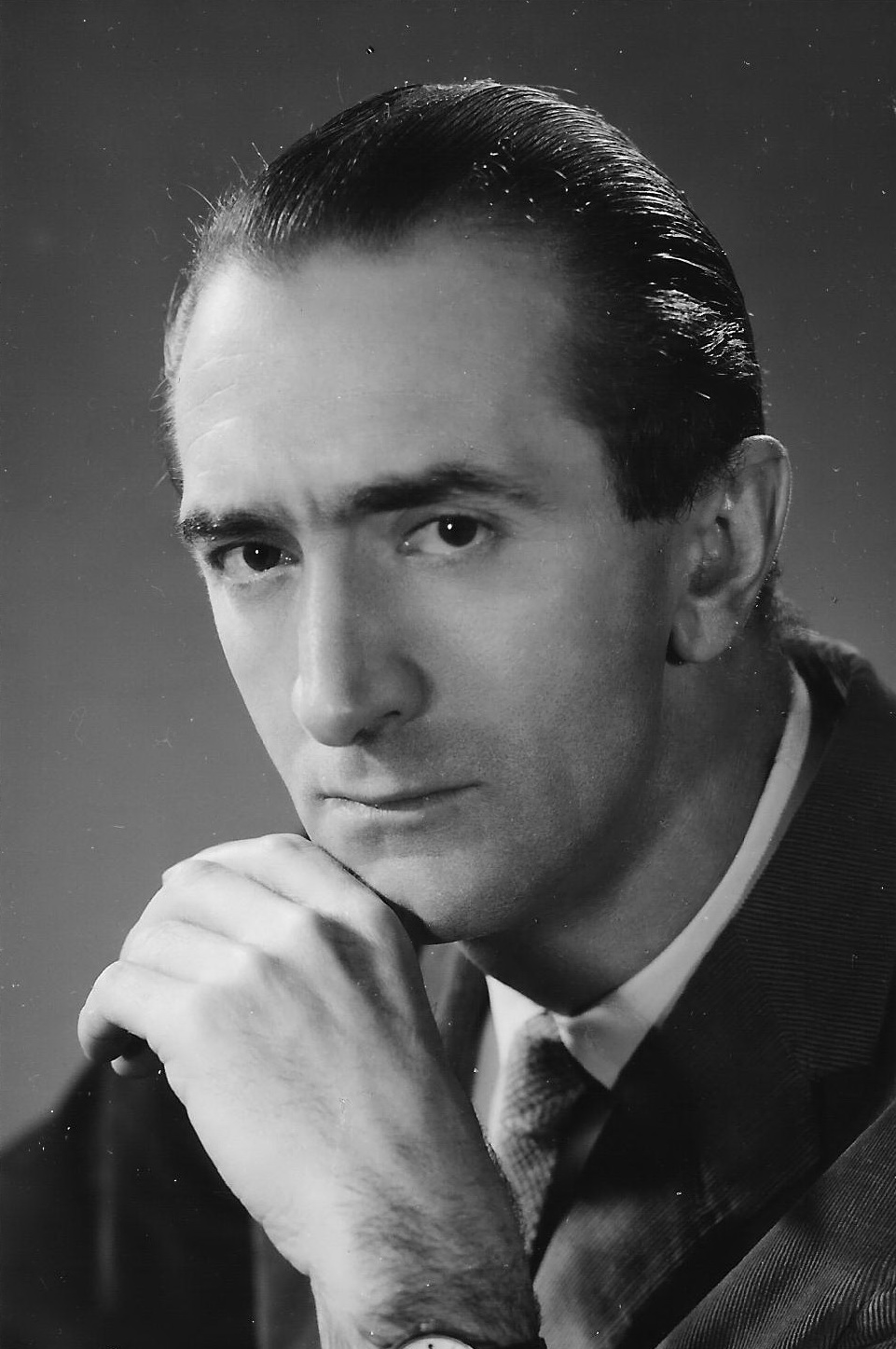
- Georges Groulx in 1947
- Born: June 26, 1922; Montreal, Quebec, Canada
- Died: February 9, 1997 (aged 74); Montreal, Quebec, Canada
- Occupation: Actor
- Years active: 1940–1982

Georges Groulx (June 26, 1922 – February 9, 1997) was a Canadian actor.

== Biography ==
Groulx was born in Montreal, Quebec, Canada. He performed his classical studies at the college Cégep de Saint-Laurent, where he soon showed a strong interest in theater. He was noticed by Father Émile Legault, a theatrical animator who had founded in 1937 the pioneering company Compagnons de Saint-Laurent. In 1939, at the invitation of Father Legault and his sister Marguerite (first actress to join the cast), Groulx joined the company. Initially assigned to various tasks, such as scenic painter, he soon participated in religious plays that belonged to the company's repertory, such as La Mort à cheval (1941) by Henri Ghéon. In 1941, having finished his classical studies, he studied one year at the École du meuble de Montréal and 1942 at the Université de Montréal, where he graduated in 1943.

He died on February 9, 1997, in Montreal.

== Partial filmography ==
- 14, rue de Galais - 1954
- Opération-mystère - 1957
- Le Courrier du roy - 1958
- Les Enquêtes Jobidon - 1962
- Le Temps des lilas - 1962
- Les Martin - 1968
- Two Women in Gold (Deux femmes en or) - 1970
- Au retour des oies blanches - 1971
- Duplessis - 1977
