= List of Canadian films of 1982 =

This is a list of Canadian films which were released in 1982:

Title	Director	Cast	Genre	Notes
After the Axe	Sturla Gunnarsson	James Douglas	National Film Board docudrama	Academy Award nominee
Amazones d'Hier, Lesbiennes d'Aujourd'hui			Documentary	
Baker Country U.S.A.	William Fruet	Henry Silva, Nicholas Campbell	Drama	Made with U.S. financing
Beyond Forty (La Quarantaine)	Anne Claire Poirier	Monique Mercure, Jacques Godin	National Film Board drama	
Big Meat Eater	Chris Windsor	Clarence Miller, George Dawson	Science fiction comedy, cult film	
Brushstrokes	Sylvie Fefer		Animated short	
By Design	Claude Jutra	Sara Botsford, Patty Duke Astin, Saul Rubinek, Clare Coulter	Drama	
Class of 1984	Mark L. Lester	Perry King, Timothy Van Patten, Michael J. Fox	Action	
Comfort and Indifference (Le Confort et l'indifférence)	Denys Arcand		Documentary	
Cries from the Deep	Jacques Gagné		Documentary	
A Day in a Taxi (Une journée en taxi)	Robert Ménard	Jean Yanne, Gilles Renaud, Monique Mercure	Drama	
Deadly Companion (Double Negative)	George Bloomfield	Anthony Perkins	Mystery	
Deadly Eyes	Robert Clouse	Sam Bloom, Scatman Crothers, Sara Botsford, Cec Linder, Lisa Langlois, Lesleh Donaldson	Horror	
Footsteps	Scott Barrie		Short drama	
Gala	Michael McKennirey, John N. Smith		Documentary	
The Great Chess Movie	Gilles Carle, Camille Coudrai		National Film Board documentary	
The Grey Fox	Phillip Borsos	Richard Farnsworth, Jackie Burroughs, Ken Pogue, Wayne Robson, Timothy Webber, Gary Reineke	Western	AV Preservation Trust Masterwork
Hard Feelings	Daryl Duke	Carl Marotte, Charlaine Woodard	Drama	
Harry Tracy, Desperado	William Graham	Bruce Dern, Helen Shaver, Michael Gwynne, Gordon Lightfoot	Western	
The Hawk	Martin Kahan	Ronnie Hawkins	Documentary	
Highpoint	Peter Carter	Christopher Plummer, Beverly D'Angelo, Kate Reid, Maury Chaykin, Saul Rubinek, Peter Donat	Drama	Stuntman Dar Robinson does the free fall from the top of the CN Tower at the end of the movie.
Humongous	Paul Lynch	Janet Julian, David Wallace	Horror	
If You Could See What I Hear	Eric Till	Marc Singer, R.H. Thomson, Shari Belafonte-Harper, Douglas Campbell	Bio-drama	Based on the biography of Tom Sullivan, a blind American singer/ songwriter and athlete; Genie Award - Supporting Actor (Thomson)
If You Love This Planet	Terri Nash	Helen Caldicott	National Film Board documentary	Oscar winner; labeled subversive by U.S. gov.
The Incubus	John Hough	John Cassavetes, John Ireland, Kerrie Keane, Helen Hughes	Horror	
Killing 'em Softly	Max Fischer	Irene Cara, Nicholas Campbell, Clark Johnson	Drama	
Larose, Pierrot and Luce (Larose, Pierrot et la Luce)	Claude Gagnon	Richard Niquette, Luc Matte, Louise Portal	Comedy-drama	
Latitude 55°	John Juliani	August Schellenberg, Andrée Pelletier	Drama	
Liona Boyd: First Lady of the Guitar	Alan Simmonds	Liona Boyd, Chet Atkins, Lenny Breau, Eli Kassner, Liberace	Documentary	Made for TV
Luc or His Share of Things (Luc ou la part des choses)	Michel Audy	Pierre Normandin, Éric Boulay, Alain Thiffault	Drama	
Melanie	Rex Bromfield	Burton Cummings, Glynnis O'Connor	Drama	Genie Awards – Foreign Actress (O’Connor), Adapted Screenplay, Song
Murder by Phone	Michael Anderson	Richard Chamberlain, John Houseman, Sara Botsford, Barry Morse	Drama	Made with U.S. financing
Odyssey in the Pacific (The Emperor of Peru)	Fernando Arrabal	Mickey Rooney, Anick, Johnathan Starr, Monique Mercure	Surreal children's film	Canada-France co-production; screenplay by Fernando Arrabal and Roger Lemelin
Paradise	Stuart Gillard	Willie Ames, Phoebe Cates, Tuvia Tavi	Drama	
Poetry in Motion	Ron Mann	Including Allen Ginsberg, Charles Bukowski and Tom Waits	Documentary	
A Portrait of Giselle	Muriel Balash		Documentary	
Red Eyes (Les Yeux rouges)	Yves Simoneau	Marie Tifo, Jean-Marie Lemieux, Pierre Curzi	Crime drama	
Scandale	George Mihalka	Sophie Lorain, Gilbert Comptois, Nanette Workman	Comedy	
Scissere	Peter Mettler	Greg Krantz	Experimental feature	
The Shimmering Beast (La bête lumineuse)	Pierre Perrault		National Film Board documentary	Screened at the 1983 Cannes Film Festival
Shocktrauma	Eric Till		Drama	
Split Image	Ted Kotcheff	Michael O'Keefe, Karen Allen, Peter Fonda	Drama	PolyGram
Spring Fever	Joseph Scanlan	Carling Bassett, Susan Anton, Frank Converse, Jessica Walter, Stephen Young	Drama	Made with U.S. financing
Sweet Lies and Loving Oaths (Doux aveux)	Fernand Dansereau	Hélène Loiselle, Marcel Sabourin, Genevieve Brassard	Drama	
Ted Baryluk's Grocery	John Paskievich, Michael Mirus		Documentary	
Track Two (Enough Is Enough)	Harry Sutherland		Documentary	
Visiting Hours	Jean-Claude Lord	Michael Ironside, Lee Grant, Linda Purl, William Shatner, Lenore Zann	Thriller	Distributed in the U.S. by 20th Century Fox, this low-budget movie was a box office success and launched Michael Ironside’s career Stateside.
Wild Flowers (Les Fleurs sauvages)	Jean Pierre Lefebvre	Marthe Nadeau, Michèle Magny, Pierre Curzi	Drama	Cannes – International Critics Prize

== See also ==
- 1982 in Canada
- 1982 in Canadian television
