= Gascon-Thomas Award =

Award presented by the National Theatre School of Canada

- Description: Canadian theatre award given to two artists, one English-speaking and one French-speaking
- Country: Canada
- Presented by: National Theatre School of Canada

The Gascon-Thomas Award is a Canadian theatre award created in 1990. It is awarded by the National Theatre School of Canada to two artists, one English-speaking and one French-speaking, and is named after two of the school's founders, Jean Gascon and Powys Thomas. The award was designed by Montreal artist Annie Michaud.

== Award winners ==
Year	English	French
1990	Joy Coghill	Gratien Gélinas
1991	Herbert Whittaker	Mercedes Palomino
1992	Martha Henry	Michelle Rossignol
1993	Neil Munro	Marcel Sabourin
1994	Mallory Gilbert	Jean-Claude Germain
1995	Mavor Moore	Louisette Dussault
1996	Diana Leblanc	Jean-Louis Millette
1997	R.H. Thomson	Paul Hébert
1998	John Murrell	Marie-Hélène Falcon
1999	Christopher Newton	Michel Tremblay
2000	Kenneth Welsh	Jean-Pierre Ronfard
2001	Ann-Marie MacDonald	Lorraine Pintal
2002	George F. Walker	André Brassard
2003	Tomson Highway	Robert Lepage
2004	Christopher Plummer	Jean-Louis Roux
2005	Jackie Maxwell	Janine Sutto
2006	Gordon Pinsent	Herménégilde Chiasson
2007	August Schellenberg	Brigitte Haentjens
2008	Sharon Pollock	Monique Mercure
2009	Sandra Oh	Paul Buissonneau
2010	Judith Thompson	Wajdi Mouawad
2011	Allan Hawco	Claude Poissant
2012	Peter Hinton	Dominic Champagne
2013	Colm Feore	Suzanne Lebeau
2014	David Latham	Michel Marc Bouchard
2015	Hannah Moscovitch	Olivier Choinière
2016	Djanet Sears	Monique Miller
2018	David Fox	Martin Faucher
2019	Weyni Mengesha	Gilles Renaud
2021	Yvette Nolan	Mellissa Larivière
2023	Heather Redfern	Guy Simard
2025	Ahdri Zhina Mandiela	Brigitte Poupart
