= Rita Lafontaine =

Canadian actress

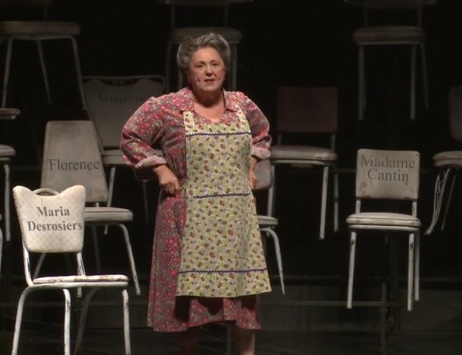
Rita Lafontaine

Rita Lafontaine OC OQ (8 June 1939 – 4 April 2016) was a Canadian theatre, film, and television actor. Born in Trois-Rivières, Quebec. She has been described as the muse of playwright Michel Tremblay and director André Brassard. Her career spanned over fifty years and left an "indelible mark on Québec theatre, film and television". She is a four-time recipient of the Gémeaux Award; three times for Best Lead Actress and once for Best Supporting Actress. She was named an Officer of the Order of Canada in 2005 and an Officer of the National Order of Quebec in 2011.

== Early life ==
Lafontaine was born on 8 June 1939 in Trois-Rivières, Quebec.

== Career ==
In the 1960s, Lafontaine joined the Mouvement Contemporain and worked closely with playwright Michel Tremblay and director André Brassard. In 1966, the trio produced Cinq, an early version of En pièces détachées at Le Patriote-en-Haut in Montreal. Their first professionally produced show was Les Belles-sœurs which premiered at the Théâtre du Rideau Vert in 1968. It remains the group's most popular and translated work. Gaëtan Charlebois from the Canadian Theatre Encyclopedia noted that the play "changed much of what was believed to be Quebec culture; language, the form of theatre, which plays should be done at which theatres, the displacing of the Old Guard."

Later that year, Lafontaine performed in L'École des bouffons, directed by Brassard and written by Michel de Ghelderode, at the Centre du Théâtre d'Aujourd'hui. Other notable shows include Double Jeu by Françoise Loranger at Théâtre de la Comédie-Canadienne in 1969, and Le Pays du dragon by Tennessee Williams at the Théâtre de Quat'Sous in 1972.

She was a very down-to-earth ordinary person who truly inhabited a role with great authenticity. She could make you cry and laugh, and she didn’t seem to be trying. She made the line between actor and character disappear. That is a rare gift.

— Pat Donnelly, theatre critic, Montreal Gazette

In 1991, she won the Prix Guy-L'Écuyer for L'homme de rêve.

In 2010, Lafontaine assisted in establishing a certificate program in theatrical interpretation at l'Université du Québec à Trois-Rivières.

== Personal life and death ==
Lafontaine married Jacques Dufour and together they had a daughter, Elsa Lessonini, who died of cancer in 2013. Lafontaine died on 4 April 2016 from complications while undergoing surgery for an intestinal condition.

== Filmography ==
- 1970 : Situation du théâtre au Québec
- 1972 : Françoise Durocher, Waitress (short film) : l'une des Françoise Durocher
- 1973 : Kamouraska : une servante
- 1973 : O.K. ... Laliberté
- 1974 : Le Grand Voyage
- 1974 : Once Upon a Time in the East (Il était une fois dans l'est) : Manon
- 1975 : The Mob (La Gammick) : l'épouse du directeur
- 1975 : The Vultures (Les vautours) : Madame Sansfaçon, une voisine
- 1976 - 1979 : Grand-Papa (TV series) : Martine
- 1976 : Let's Talk About Love (Parlez-nous d'amour) : la grande admiratrice de Jeannot
- 1977 : Bernie and the Gang (Ti-mine, Bernie pis la gang...) : Linda
- 1977 : The Late Blossom (Le Soleil se lève en retard) : Gisèle Lapointe
- 1978 : The Machine Age (L'Âge de la machine) (short film)
- 1982 - 1985 : Les Moineau et les Pinson (TV series) : Marie-Madeleine Moineau
- 1985 : Manon (TV series) : Juliette Labelle
- 1988 : The Revolving Doors (Les Portes tournantes) : Madame Beaumont
- 1990 - 1993 : Cormoran (TV series) : Zénone Veilleux
- 1992 : Phantom Life (La Vie fantôme) : Claire
- 1992 : La Montagne du Hollandais (TV series ) : Léonie Grandmont
- 1994 : Soho
- 1994 : My Friend Max (Mon amie Max) : Madame Brabant
- 1996 - 2001 : Le Retour (TV series) : Rose Landry
- 1996 : The Ideal Man (L'Homme idéal) : la mère de Lucie
- 1998 : Streetheart (Le Cœur au poing) : Rita
- 2000 : Le Monde de Charlotte (TV series) : Reine Langevin
- 2001 : Les Parfaits (TV series) : Étiennette Labelle
- 2001 : Les Boys 3 : la mère de Ti-Guy
- 2002 : Les Super Mamies (TV series) : Monique Durand
- 2003 : Seducing Doctor Lewis (La Grande Séduction) : Hélène Lesage
- 2003 - 2016 : L'Auberge du chien noir (TV series) : Nicole Provencher
- 2004 - 2006 : Un monde à part (TV series) : Reine Langevin
- 2009 : Noémie : Le Secret : Madame Lumbago
- 2010 : A Life Begins (Une vie qui commence) : la grand-mère

== Honours and awards ==
- 1990 : Gémeaux Award for Best Supporting Actress – Drama (Michel et François, Avec un grand A), Academy of Canadian Cinema and Television (ACCT)
- 1992 : Guy-L’Écuyer Award (L’Homme de rêve), Rendez-vous du cinéma québécois
- 1992 : Gémeaux Award for Best Lead Actress – Drama (L’Homme de rêve), ACCT
- 1995 : Nominated for the Dora Mavor Moore Award for Outstanding Performance by a Female in a Principal Role – Play (Large Theatre)
- 1999 : Gémeaux Award for Best Lead Actress ‒ Television Drama (Le Retour), ACCT
- 2000 : Gémeaux Award for Best Lead Actress ‒ Television Drama (Le Retour), ACCT
- 2005 : Officer of the Order of Canada
- 2007 : Prix hommage, Gala des Femmes du cinéma, de la télévision et des nouveaux médias
- 2009 : Tribute, Théâtre Espace GO
- 2009 : Honorary doctorate, Université du Québec à Trois-Rivières
- 2011 : Officer of the National Order of Quebec
