= Frédérique Collin =

Canadian actress, screenwriter and film director

Frédérique Collin (born 1944 in Montreal, Quebec) is a Canadian actress, screenwriter and film director. She is most noted for her performance in Marie in the City (Marie s'en va-t'en ville), for which she received a Genie Award nomination for Best Actress at the 9th Genie Awards.

Her other acting credits have included the films Françoise Durocher, Waitress, Réjeanne Padovani, Once Upon a Time in the East (Il était une fois dans l'est), Gina, The Absence (L'Absence), Lucien Brouillard, To Be Sixteen (Avoir 16 ans), Lessons on Life (Trois pommes à côté du sommeil) and Au fil de l'eau, and the television series Témoignages and Fortier. Her stage roles included productions of Anne Legault's Conte d'hiver 70 and Michel Tremblay's High Mass for a Full Moon of Summer (Messe solonnelle pour une pleine lune d'été).

She was also co-director and co-writer with Paule Baillargeon of the 1980 film La cuisine rouge.

She dropped out of acting after 2003, reemerging in the early 2010s as a mental health and art therapy advocate after going public about her battles with alcoholism, drug addiction and compulsive gambling.

== List of roles ==
=== Cinema ===
- 1971 : Question de vie : Estelle
- 1972 : Françoise Durocher, Waitress - Françoise Durocher
- 1972 : The Time of the Hunt (Le Temps d'une chasse) : The young servant
- 1973 : The Conquest (La Conquête) : Rita
- 1973 : Réjeanne Padovani : Hélène Caron
- 1973 : Les Allées de la terre : Zette
- 1973 : Noël et Juliette : rôle inconnu
- 1974 : Once Upon a Time in the East : Lise Paquette
- 1975 : Gina : Dolorès
- 1975 : The Yellow Island (L'Île jaune) : Suzanne
- 1975 : Confidences of the Night (L'Amour blessé)
- 1976 : The Absence (L'Absence) : Louise
- 1983 : Lucien Brouillard
- 1985 : Celui qui voit les heures : Mireille
- 1986 : Sonia : unnamed role
- 1987 : Marie in the City (Marie s'en va-t-en ville)
- 1988 : Lamento pour un homme de lettres : The wife of Laberge
- 1989 : Lessons on Life (Trois pommes à côté du sommeil) : Thérèse
- 2002 : Au fil de l'eau : Fabienne
- 2003 : Evil Words (Sur le seuil) : Madame Hénault

=== Television ===
- 1971 : Fanfreluche (TV series) : Lucas (one episode)
- 1977 : Du tac au tac (TV series) : Hélène
- 1980 : Jeune Délinquant (miniseries) : Lawyer
- 1997 : Les Orphelins de Duplessis (miniseries) : Sœur Clothilde
- 2001 : Fortier (TV series) : Jeannine Doyle (two episodes)
- 2002 : Asbestos : Madame Duquette

=== As director ===
- 1980 : La Cuisine rouge

=== As writer ===
- 1980 : La Cuisine rouge

=== Theatre ===
- 1971 : Les Belles-Sœurs by Michel Tremblay, directed by André Brassard - role of Lise Paquette, friend of Linda Lauzon
- 1973 : Les Belles-Sœurs by Michel Tremblay, directed by André Brassard - role of Lise Paquette, friend of Linda Lauzon
- 1974 : Les Belles-Sœurs by Michel Tremblay, directed by André Brassard - role of Marie-Ange Brouillette, neighbour of Germaine Lauzon
