= Michèle Lalonde =

Canadian poet and writer (1937–2021)

- Born: July 28, 1937; Montreal, Quebec, Canada
- Died: July 22, 2021 (aged 83); Montreal, Quebec, Canada
- Occupations: Dramatist; Essayist; Playwright; Poet
- Years active: 1957–2021
- Notable work: Speak White
- Spouse: Yves-Jules Duchastel de Montrouge
- Children: 3

Michèle Lalonde (July 28, 1937 – July 22, 2021) was a Canadian dramatist, essayist, playwright and poet for print and radio. She began her career as a writer and publisher while studying for a Bachelor of Arts degree at the Université de Montréal. Throughout her career, Lalonde worked at the editorial boards of the magazine Situations, the journal Liberte and Maintenant. She authored historical plays and collections of poems and won the 1980 Prix Duvernay from the Saint-Jean-Baptiste Society. Lalonde was professor of the history of civilizations at the National Theatre School of Canada, served as president of both the Fédération internationale des écrivains de langue française and the Quebec Writers' Union, and was a member of the Order of Francophones of America. Her works from 1957 to 1977 are stored in the Montreal collection of the Bibliothèque et Archives nationales du Québec.

== Early life and education ==
On July 28, 1937, Lalonde was born in Montreal, Quebec, Canada, to Hector Lalonde and Clairette Senecal. She graduated from the Université de Montréal with a Bachelor of Arts degree in philosophy in 1959. In 1960, Lalonde conducted research at Harvard University, then at the University of Baltimore from 1963 to 1964 and at the University of London between 1963 and 1964. She also worked on an uncompleted doctorate at the Université de Montréal in 1965.

== Career ==
Lalonde began her career as a writer and publisher while studying at university. In March 1957, she authored the historical play Ankrania ou celui qui crie that was produced at Montreal's Le Proscenium at the Festival d'Art Dramatique de l'Ouest du Quebec. Also that same year, Lalonde helped to organize annual gatherings of Canadian writers referred to as "recontres" now known as Rencontre Quebecoise Internationale des Ecrivains. Her first book of poetry, Songe de la fiancée détruite published in 1958, focuses on solitude and people's inability to communicate. The following year, Lalonde authored another collection of poetry, Geôles. In the same year, she joined the editorial board of the magazine Situations as cultural and literary reviewer. From 1963 to 1964, Lalonde served as a member of the board of the journal Liberte, writing articles and news stories. At the journal, she got more immersed in the Canadian literary scene composed of authors and intellectuals.

In 1967, Lalonde authored the poem collection Terre des hommes. Poeme pour deux recitants. The poem was performed at Expo 67's inauguration ceremonies with André Prévost providing backup music. She wrote the poem, Speak White, hurriedly for the actress Michelle Rossignol to read in May 1968 at the height of the 1960s Quiet Revolution in Quebec, became her most famous work and denounces "the inferior cultural, social and economic conditions of French Canadians, while calling for the solidarity of oppressed peoples against all forms of colonialism and imperialism." Lalonde recited Speak White in essays, lectures, manifestos and statements concerning politics, intellectual and authors' rules, and Quebec women's status. In 1973 and 1974, she was part of the editorial team of Maintenant, writing a series of essays about Quebec nationalism and the debate on linguistics.

She wrote the screenplay for the 1973 drama film The Conquest (La Conquête), directed by Jacques Gagné.

She experimented with the 1977 historical play known as Dernier recours de Baptiste à Catherine that was first produced at Montreal's Theatre d'Aujourd'hui. Lalonde compiled her best works between 1965 and 1975 into the collection Défense et illustration de la langue québécoise and Portee disparue in 1979. The following year, she won the Prix Duvernay from the Saint-Jean-Baptiste Society for her work, and worked on the film concerning La Nuit de poesie, where she read Speak White. In 1981, she co-wrote Cause commune: manifeste pour une internationale des petites cultures with Denis Moniere and Petit testament: Outremont on her own. Lalonde was made president of the International Federation of French-language writers three years later. In 1989, she wrote with Jean Dozois and Jean Poupart Construction sociale de la dangerosite: pratique criminologique et systeme penal for the Conseil quebecois de la recherche sociale of the Government of Quebec.

Lalonde served as professor of the history of civilizations at the National Theatre School of Canada from 1976 to 1980. Between 1982 and 1986, she served as the Fédération internationale des écrivains de langue française's president. Lalonde was president of the Quebec Writers' Union from November 1984 to November 1986. She received the Prix du poète from the Francophone Poetry Market in 2004. Lalonde has been a member of the Order of Francophones of America since 1985. Manuscripts of some of her works are kept in the Montreal collection of the Bibliothèque et Archives nationales du Québec, and her works were broadcast on Radio-Canada.

She died on July 22, 2021, in Montreal.

== Personal life ==
Lalonde was married to neurologist Yves-Jules Duchastel de Montrouge. They had three children.

== Analysis ==
According to Ian Lockerbie in Lalonde's entry in The New Oxford Companion to Literature in French, she was "prominent among the many Quebec writers in the 1960s who committed themselves publicly to the nationalist cause through public performances, poster poems, marches, and manifestos." Mary Jean Green noted the poet described her works as "very intimist poems ... where I speak in a personal voice." But, in the mid-1960s, Lalonde's works had become "‘committed’: no longer addressed to a limited readership, they sought a wider audience and adherence to the socio-political concerns of the people. In addition, the borders between poetry and the essay began to disappear for her, ‘commitment’ becoming the major concern in her work." She had, according to Green, "become conscious of her role in the struggle for Quebec's autonomy" and that "a significant shift occurred in her poetic voice."
