= Marthe Blackburn =

Canadian screenwriter

Marthe Blackburn, née Morisset (1916 – 1991) was a Canadian screenwriter from Quebec. A television writer for Radio-Canada and later a film writer for the National Film Board of Canada, she was most noted for her collaborations with director Anne Claire Poirier. Blackburn and Poirier were Genie Award nominees for Best Original Screenplay at the 1st Genie Awards in 1980 for A Scream from Silence (Mourir à tue-tête).

She was the author of "Le retour de l’âge", a short theatrical piece which was part of the collaborative feminist theatre work La nef des sorcières alongside pieces by Luce Guilbeault, France Théoret, Odette Gagnon, Marie-Claire Blais, Pol Pelletier and Nicole Brossard. She was one of the co-directors of the documentary film À qui appartient ce gage?, and had a small acting role in the 1980 film Cordélia.

She was married to composer Maurice Blackburn, with whom she collaborated on the libretto for his opera Une mesure de silence, and was the mother of science fiction writer Esther Rochon.

== Filmography ==
- Les filles du Roy (1974)
- Before the Time Comes (Le temps de l'avant) (1975)
- Shakti (1976)
- Dernier envol (1977)
- A Scream from Silence (Mourir à tue-tête) (1979)
- Azzel (1979)
- Dominga (1979)
- Beyond Forty (La Quarantaine) (1982)
- Firewords, Part 1: Louky Bersianik (1986)
- Firewords, Part 2: Jovette Marchessault (1986)
- Firewords, Part 3: Nicole Brossard (1986)
- Ah! Vous dirai-je, maman (1987)
- Salut Victor (1989)
- Dessine-moi une chanson (1991)
