= Before the Time Comes =

- French: Le Temps de l'avant
- Directed by: Anne Claire Poirier
- Written by: Marthe Blackburn; Louise Carré; Anne Claire Poirier
- Produced by: Anne Claire Poirier
- Starring: Luce Guilbeault; Pierre Gobeil; Paule Baillargeon
- Cinematography: Michel Brault; Suzanne Gabori
- Edited by: Jacques Gagné; Christian Marcotte
- Music by: Maurice Blackburn
- Production company: National Film Board of Canada
- Release date: April 17, 1975
- Running time: 93 minutes
- Country: Canada
- Language: French

Before the Time Comes (French: Le Temps de l'avant) is a Canadian drama film, directed by Anne Claire Poirier and released in 1975. The film stars Luce Guilbeault as Hélène, a housewife and mother who is raising her three children largely on her own without much help from her itinerant sailor husband Gabriel (Pierre Gobeil); when she becomes pregnant for a fourth time, she struggles both with her conscience and the opinions of her husband and her sister Monique (Paule Baillargeon) as she considers whether or not to have an abortion.

It was the first Canadian film ever to address the subject of abortion.

The film opened in Quebec theatres in 1975, and was subsequently screened in the International Critics' Week program at the 1976 Cannes Film Festival.
