= Montreal Blues =

1972 film by Pascal Gélinas

- Directed by: Pascal Gélinas
- Written by: Pascal Gélinas; Raymond Cloutier; Claude Laroche
- Produced by: Jean Dansereau
- Starring: Paule Baillargeon; Jocelyn Bérubé; Raymond Cloutier; Suzanne Garceau; Claude Laroche; Guy Thauvette
- Cinematography: Allen Smith
- Edited by: Pascal Gélinas
- Music by: Louis Baillargeon
- Production company: Les Ateliers du cinéma québécois
- Distributed by: France Film
- Release date: September 14, 1972 (Cinémathèque québécoise)
- Running time: 100 minutes
- Country: Canada
- Language: French

Montreal Blues is a Canadian improvisational drama film, directed by Pascal Gélinas and released in 1972. Created in collaboration with the Grand Cirque ordinaire, a Montreal theatre troupe active in the late 1960s and early 1970s, the film centres on a group of young people living in a housing commune, who decide to open a health food restaurant together.

The core roles were portrayed by troupe members Paule Baillargeon, Jocelyn Bérubé, Raymond Cloutier, Suzanne Garceau, Claude Laroche and Guy Thauvette, with Ginette Anfousse, Francine Lapan, Gilbert Sicotte, Josée Yvon and Mylène Demongeot in supporting roles.

It was the troupe's second film following 1971's The Great Ordinary Movie (Le Grand Film ordinaire).

The film was submitted to the 24th Canadian Film Awards in 1972.

== Synopsis ==
Young marginalized people living in a commune decide to open an organic restaurant.
