= Edward O. Phillips =

Canadian novelist (1931–2020)

- Born: Edward Openshaw Phillips; November 26, 1931; Montreal, Quebec, Canada
- Died: May 30, 2020 (aged 88); Canada
- Occupation: Novelist
- Writing career
- Period: 1980s–2020s
- Notable works: Sunday's Child, Buried on Sunday

Edward Openshaw Phillips (November 26, 1931 – May 30, 2020) was a Canadian novelist who wrote both mystery novels and mainstream literary fiction. He was best known for his mystery novel series featuring gay detective Geoffrey Chadwick.

== Biography ==
Phillips lived most of his life in Westmount, Quebec. He graduated from Bishop's College School and earned a law degree from the Université de Montréal in 1956, but decided against legal practice. He subsequently graduated from Harvard University with a master's degree in teaching, and later earned a second master's degree in English literature from Boston University. After teaching school for seven years, first in the public English school system and then at Selwyn House School, he pursued a long-time interest in painting. His work was exhibited in five one-man and numerous group shows.

His first novel, Sunday's Child, was published in 1981, and was shortlisted for the Books in Canada First Novel Award. Phillips won the Arthur Ellis Award for Best Novel in 1987 for his novel Buried on Sunday, and was shortlisted for the Stephen Leacock Memorial Medal for Humour in 1989 for his novel Hope Springs Eternal. His short story "Matthew and Chauncy" was adapted by Anne Claire Poirier into the 1989 film Salut Victor.

He was out as gay. His partner, Kenneth Woodman, predeceased him in 2018.

Phillips died in May 2020, from heart failure and complications of COVID-19 during the COVID-19 pandemic in Canada.

== Works ==
- Sunday's Child
- Where There's a Will
- A Voyage on Sunday
- No Early Birds
- The Mice Will Play
- Buried on Sunday
- Sunday Best
- Working on Sunday
- Hope Springs Eternal
- The Landlady's Niece
- A Month of Sundays
- The Queen's Court
