= Esther Rochon =

Canadian science fiction writer (born 1948)

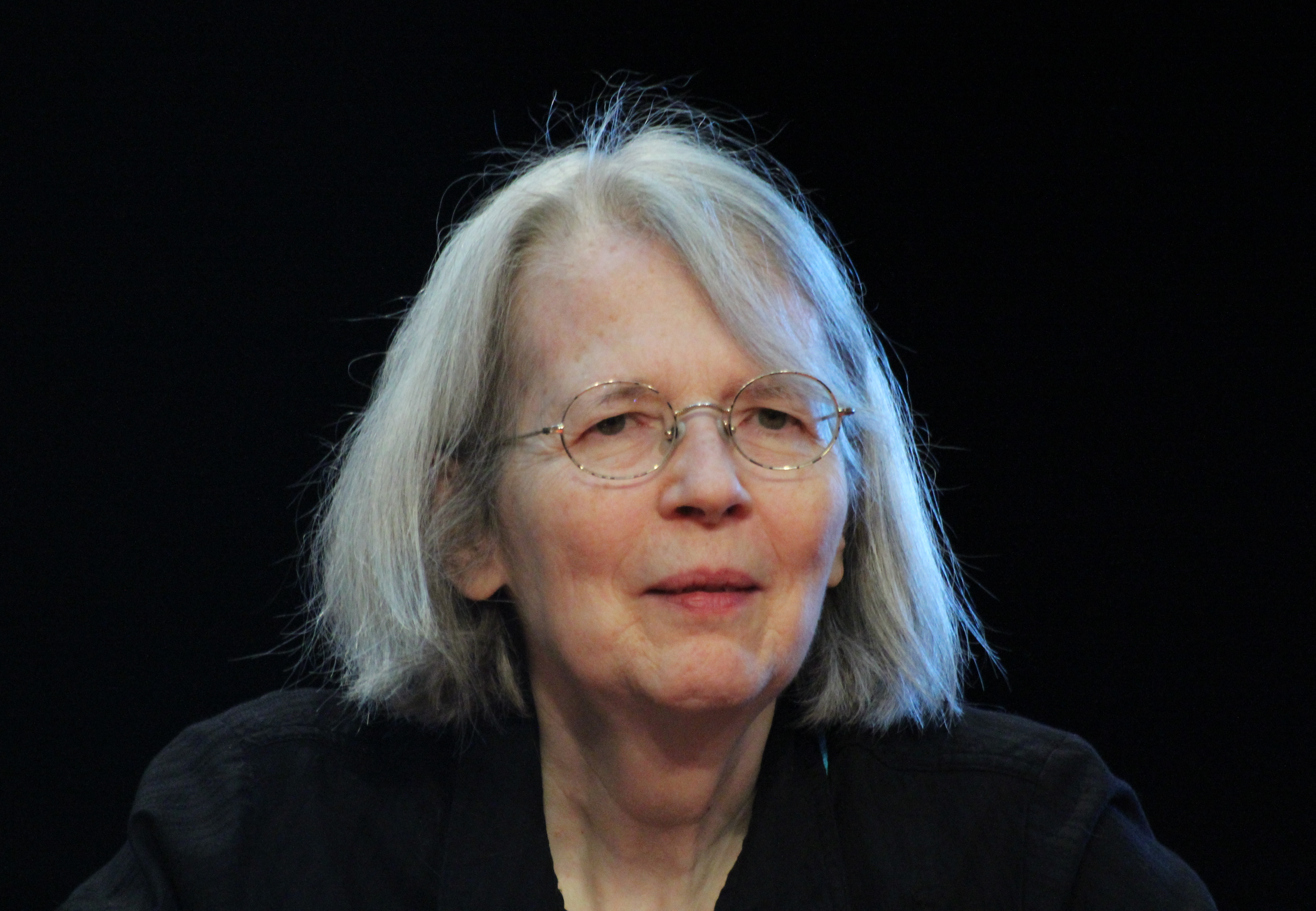
Esther Rochon in 2014

Esther Rochon (née Blackburn, born 27 June 1948) is a Canadian science fiction writer.

Born in Quebec City, Quebec, the daughter of screenwriter Marthe Blackburn and composer Maurice Blackburn. At the age of 16, she won the Governor General First Prize for a short story in the Young Author's contest of Radio Canada, where she tied with Michel Tremblay. Rochon studied Mathematics at the Université de Montréal.

She has won the Quebec Science Fiction Fantasy Grand Prix four times.

== Selected bibliography ==
- En hommage aux araignées — 1974
- L'épuisement du soleil — 1985
- Coquillage — 1987 (translated as The Shell, 1990)
- L'espace du diamant — 1991
