= La Conquete =

La Conquête (meaning The Conquest in French) may refer to:

- The Conquest (1973), a Canadian film
- The Conquest (2011), a French film
- Conquest of New France (1758–1760), a British military campaign
