= Louisette Dussault =

Canadian actress and writer (1940–2023)

Louisette Dussault (12 June 1940 – 14 March 2023) was a Canadian actress and writer from Quebec.

== Life and career ==
Louisette Dussault was born in Thetford Mines and studied at the National Theatre School of Canada. With Jean-Claude Germain, she founded Les Enfants de Chénier and took part in their show Grand Spectacle d'adieu. She performed in works by André Brassard and Michel Tremblay, including the film Françoise Durocher, Waitress, first readings of Les Belles-Soeurs, Demain matin, Montréal m'attend and Tremblay's translations of Lysistrata and Dario Fo's Mistero Buffo. She appeared in the important feminist works La Nef des sorcières and Les Fées ont soif, as well as in her own monologue Moman. This last work was translated into English as Mommy and was included in the collection Anthology of Quebec Women's Plays in English Translation Vol I (1966–1986) (2006). Dussault wrote and performed in the play Pandora ou Mon p'tit papa. She appeared in the title role in the award-winning play Le voyage magnifique d'Emily Carr.

Dussault also performed on television and in film. From 1964 to 1971, she performed in the title role of the children's television series la souris verte. She also appeared in the television series Marilyn, Les héritiers Duval, Rumeurs, Les étoiles filantes and Destinées.

Dussault was awarded the Prix Victor-Morin in 1995.

Dussault died on 14 March 2023, at the age of 82.
