= The Absence (1976 film) =

- French: L'Absence
- Directed by: Brigitte Sauriol
- Written by: Brigitte Sauriol
- Produced by: Bernard Lalonde; Guy-Jude Côté
- Starring: Frédérique Collin; Jean Gascon
- Cinematography: Daniel Fournier
- Edited by: Louise Andrée Michaud
- Production company: ACPAV
- Release date: 1976
- Running time: 93 minutes
- Country: Canada
- Language: French

The Absence (French: L'Absence) is a Canadian drama film, directed by Brigitte Sauriol and released in 1976. The film stars Frédérique Collin as Louise, a successful photographer whose estranged father Paul (Jean Gascon) returns after an absence of 20 years, as he is suffering from a terminal illness and needs her help.

The film's cast also includes Jocelyn Bérubé, Louisette Dussault, Guy Thauvette and Monique Mercure.

The film was screened at the inaugural 1976 Festival of Festivals.
