= Deaf to the City =

- French: Le sourd dans la ville
- Directed by: Mireille Dansereau
- Written by: Mireille Dansereau; Michèle Mailhot; Jean-Joseph Tremblay
- Based on: Le sourd dans la ville by Marie-Claire Blais
- Produced by: Louise Carré; Suzanne Laverdière; Claire Stevens
- Starring: Angèle Coutu; Béatrice Picard; Guillaume Lemay-Thivierge
- Cinematography: Michel Caron
- Edited by: Louise Côté
- Music by: Ginette Bellavance
- Release date: October 30, 1987
- Language: French

Deaf to the City (French: Le sourd dans la ville) is a 1987 Canadian drama film, written and directed by Mireille Dansereau and based on the novel with the same name by Marie-Claire Blais. The film stars Angèle Coutu as Florence, a woman who moves into a seedy hotel in downtown Montreal after her husband leaves her, befriending the hotel's owner Gloria (Béatrice Picard) and her deaf son Mike (Guillaume Lemay-Thivierge).

The film was entered into the main competition at the 44th edition of the Venice Film Festival.

In his 2003 book A Century of Canadian Cinema, Gerald Pratley referred to it as "a bleak story to read, and an even bleaker film to watch".

== Cast ==
- Angèle Coutu as Florence
- Béatrice Picard as Gloria
- Guillaume Lemay-Thivierge as Mike
- Sophie Léger
- Han Masson
- Pierre Thériault
