= Cordélia (film) =

- Directed by: Jean Beaudin
- Written by: Jean Beaudin; Marcel Sabourin
- Based on: La lampe dans la fenêtre by Pauline Cadieux
- Produced by: Roger Frappier; Jacques Gagné; Jean-Marc Garand
- Starring: Louise Portal
- Cinematography: Pierre Mignot
- Edited by: Jean Beaudin
- Music by: Maurice Blackburn
- Production company: National Film Board
- Release date: February 7, 1980 (Canada)
- Running time: 116 minutes
- Country: Canada
- Language: French
- Budget: $450,000 (estimated)

Cordélia is a 1980 Canadian French language film directed and written by Jean Beaudin. It is an adaptation of the novel La lampe dans la fenêtre by Pauline Cadieux, itself based on the real-life 1890s murder trial of Cordélia Viau and Samuel Parslow.

== Plot ==
Set in a Quebec village in the 1890s, the film centres on Cordélia Viau (Louise Portal), a young married woman who is a seamstress and the local church organ player. She is a free spirit enjoying life. Her much older husband can't find a job locally and travels to California to find work. Cordelia loves to entertain and has soirées with music and dancing. She is often seen with Samuel Parslow, a handyman, friend of her husband which attracts criticism from the conservative society around them. One evening after a drunken soiree of dance and music, Cordelia refuses the advances of a lawyer friend who leaves angry. Later with the prospect of work close by, the husband returns to the village and life goes back to normal. One morning the husband is discovered dead, victim of a savage and brutal attack. Gossip in the village puts the blame for the murder on Cordelia and Samuel, accused also of being lovers. A summary investigation, a false confession and the determination of the judge to punish the woman for her morals even without proof of her involvement in the murder sees the woman and the handyman convicted. An appeal is lodged and a re-trial is ordered. Despite the plea by Cordelia's solicitor to have the second trial moved to a less biased town and in front of a less biased judge, the second trial remains, after the lobbying of the previously jilted lawyer and the judge himself, in the same town and with the same judge. The second trial is just a formality. Both Cordelia and Samuel are found guilty again and sentenced to hang. Their execution is played out in front of a large crowd of men.

== Cast ==
- Louise Portal as Cordelia Viau
- Gaston Lepage as Samuel Parslow
- Raymond Cloutier as Me Jos Fortier
- Gilbert Sicotte as Me Jean-Dominique Leduc
- James Blendick as Bourreau Radcliff
- Pierre Gobeil as Isidore Poirier
- Marcel Sabourin as Sheriff Lapointe
- Rolland Bédard as Tournecle Groulx
- Claude Gauthier as Cure Pineau
- Jean-Pierre Masson as Hotelier Lacombe
- Lionel Villeneuve as M. Bouvrette
- Olivette Thibault as Mme Bouvrette
- Jean Duceppe as Juge Ouimet
- Jean Gascon as Juge Wurtele
- Gratien Gélinas as Juge Bosse
- Doris Lussier as Juge Blanchet
- Gilles Vigneault as Juge Hall
- Michelle Rossignol as Mme Neveu
- Henry Ramer as Det. McCasill

== Critical response ==
Mark Leslie of Cinema Canada favourably reviewed the film, writing that "Like Beaudin's last feature, J.A. Martin photographe, Cordelia is also a sumptuous period piece of pastel colours, soft, expressive lighting and glimpses of a visually beautiful past. But occasionally the prettiness of these images creates a discord in the film, not unlike that resulting from the unexplained plot details already discussed. The beautiful light in the jail makes Cordelia's imprisonment appear unnecessarily romantic."

The film was one of two, alongside Jean-Claude Labrecque's The Coffin Affair (L'Affaire Coffin), which was criticized by justice Jules Deschênes of the Quebec Superior Court for having purportedly erred in points of law. According to Deschênes, there was no evidence that the real Cordélia Viau had not committed the murder, and thus the film's thesis that she was wrongfully convicted was slanderous to the judicial system.

== Awards ==
The film received seven Genie Award nominations at the 1st Genie Awards in 1980.

Award	Date of ceremony	Category	Recipient(s)	Result	Ref(s)
Genie Awards	March 20, 1980	Best Picture	Jean-Marc Garand, Roger Frappier, Jacques Gagné	Nominated	
Genie Awards	March 20, 1980	Best Actress	Louise Portal	Nominated	
Genie Awards	March 20, 1980	Best Adapted Screenplay	Jean Beaudin, Marcel Sabourin	Nominated	
Genie Awards	March 20, 1980	Best Cinematography	Pierre Mignot	Nominated	
Genie Awards	March 20, 1980	Best Art Direction or Production Design	Denis Boucher, Vianney Gauthier	Nominated	
Genie Awards	March 20, 1980	Best Costume Design	Louise Jobin	Won	
Genie Awards	March 20, 1980	Best Editing	Jean Beaudin	Nominated	
