= Once Upon a Time in the East (1974 film) =

1974 film

- French: Il était une fois dans l'est
- Directed by: André Brassard
- Written by: André Brassard; Michel Tremblay
- Produced by: Pierre Lamy
- Starring: Denise Filiatrault
- Cinematography: Paul Van der Linden
- Edited by: André Corriveau
- Production companies: Canadian Film Development; Les Productions Carle-Lemy
- Release date: 27 February 1974
- Running time: 101 minutes
- Country: Canada
- Language: French
- Budget: $300,000
- Box office: $1 million (Canada)

Once Upon a Time in the East (French: Il était une fois dans l'est) is a 1974 Canadian drama film directed by André Brassard. The film stars Denise Filiatrault, Michelle Rossignol, Frédérique Collin, Amulette Garneau, Béatrice Picard and Rita Lafontaine. It was entered into the 1974 Cannes Film Festival.

== Synopsis ==
The film is based on several plays by Michel Tremblay, weaving characters from the plays Les Belles-sœurs, Hosanna, La duchesse de Langeais and À toi, pour toujours, ta Marie-Lou into an original ensemble cast story.

Some of the characters include: Helene who quits her waitress job and goes back to the club; Pierrette has been dumped by her boyfriend and turns to the bottle to drown her sorrows; Lise ends up having an abortion, rather than bringing a baby into a world she can't stand; Carmen sings in the drag club; and Hosanna, who is the recipient of her "sisters" fury, because they want to get even with her for all the things she has done to them, so after discovering what she is wearing to the big bash, everybody copies her outfit.

== Cast ==
- Denise Filiatrault as Hélène
- Michelle Rossignol as Pierrette
- Frédérique Collin as Lise Paquette
- Sophie Clément as Carmen
- André Montmorency as Sandra
- Amulette Garneau as Bec de lièvre
- Denis Drouin as Maurice
- Jean Archambault as Hosanna
- Gilles Renaud as Cuirette
- Claude Gai as la Duchesse de Langeais
- Manda Parent as Germaine Lauzon
- Béatrice Picard as Robertine
- Rita Lafontaine as Manon
- Mireille Rochon as Linda Lauzon
- Johnny Pothitos as le P'tit
- Jean-Pierre Bergeron as the cleaner

== Reception ==
Film critic Martin Knelman was not impressed with the movie, saying the film "is a nervy, nasty exercise which works too hard at being a knockout; the result is an exasperating, eclectic mess of a picture; surely one of the most astonishing failures ever produced in Canada." Likewise, critic Lowell Cohn didn't care for the film either, stating that "there is an amateurism which pervades all parts of the movie; the photography is grainy, sometimes unclear, and the acting, such as there is, seems largely improvised and unsure of itself." The Chicago Tribune called the film a "transvestite turkey; a drag in more ways than one."

Author Monica Sullivan wrote "the ending is a downer, as it drains the humor and energy out of the 100 minutes that went before it; perhaps Brassard didn't know how to wrap up this rich slice of life." Canadian film critic Gerald Pratley commented the film has "a good deal of truth, a knowing insight into hearts and minds, and some rousing performances make the sensational aspects of the activity depicted very real and touched with tragedy."

The Bay Area Reporter observed that "it's a very interesting if somewhat depressing film; we meet various interesting characters yet never really learn too much about them." American film critic Vincent Canby wrote the film "has more busy moments than affecting ones; the characters all seem to be related to one another or, at least, to know one another, but there is very little sense of community in the movie; it's like a Broadway tribute of some sort, composed entirely of big moments from other shows."

Film critic Thomas Quinn Curtiss said it is a "film of unusual quality; female impersonators perform and temperaments clash bitterly; the actors give gripping, intense performances; this is a promising film debut for Brassard." Canadian film critic Thomas Waugh opined that "this story and the other plots woven in and around the universe of the drag queens, waitresses, lesbians, housewives, and drunks of the 'East' – dissolve in rejection, bitterness and rage."

== See also ==
- André Brassard filmography
- Cinema of Canada
- List of Canadian films of 1974
- List of LGBTQ-related films of 1974
