= Salut Victor =

- Directed by: Anne Claire Poirier
- Written by: Anne Claire Poirier; Marthe Blackburn
- Based on: "Matthew and Chauncy" by Edward O. Phillips
- Starring: Jean-Louis Roux; Jacques Godin; Julie Vincent
- Release date: September 24, 1989
- Running time: 89 minutes
- Country: Canada
- Language: French

Salut Victor is a Canadian film, released in 1989. Based on Edward O. Phillips's short story "Matthew and Chauncy", the film was directed by Anne Claire Poirier and written by Poirier and Marthe Blackburn.

The film stars Jean-Louis Roux as Philippe and Jacques Godin as Victor, two older men living in a retirement home who fall in love; prior to moving into the home, Victor was openly gay while Philippe was in the closet about his own repressed homosexuality.

The film was produced for the National Film Board.

== Cast ==
- Jean Besré
- Muriel Dutil
- Jacques Godin as Victor Laprade
- Juliette Huot
- Marthe Nadeau
- Huguette Oligny
- Jean-Louis Roux as Philippe Lanctot
- Julie Vincent

== See also ==
- List of LGBT films directed by women
