= Roger Frappier =

Canadian producer, director, editor, actor and screenwriter

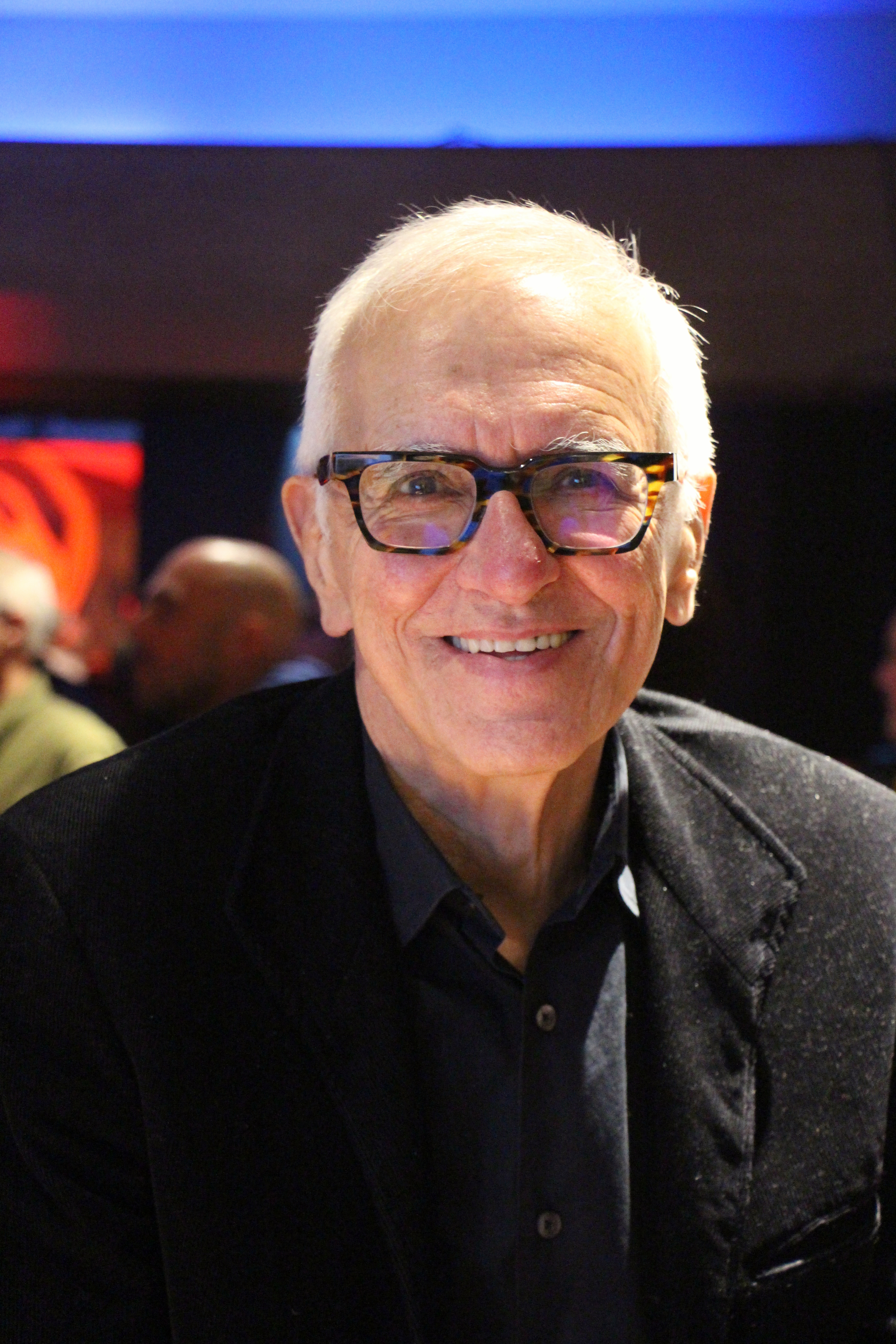
Image of Roger Frappier

Roger Frappier (born April 14, 1945) is a Canadian producer, director, editor, actor, and screenwriter.

== Biography ==
Roger Frappier worked in all areas of the film business, from film critic to television commercial director to director/ producer of the experimental feature documentary Le Gand film ordinaire, until he found his true vocation as a hands-on producer. While at the National Film Board of Canada in the early 1980s, he assembled a group of writer/directors who collaborated on developing edgy, urban dramas. The script for Le Déclin de l’empire américain emerged from the process that Frappier had set in motion. With that film's phenomenal success, Frappier rose to the ranks of the top producers of feature films in Quebec. He left the NFB in 1986 and founded Max Films with Pierre Gendron, producing Un Zoo la nuit in 1987, the winner of 13 Genie Awards, still a record. His many other films include Pouvoir intime, Anne Trister, Jésus de Montréal, Ding et Dong, le film and Cosmos. Members of the Cosmos collective went on to make two of the most celebrated works in recent Québécois cinema, Un 32 août sur terre and Maelström, underscoring Frappier's eye for fresh talent. His 2003 production, the affable Seducing Doctor Lewis, became one of the highest-grossing films at the domestic box office in Canadian film history.

== Filmography ==
=== As producer ===
- 1971: The Great Ordinary Movie (Le Grand film ordinaire)
- 1974: We're Right to Rebel (On a raison de se révolter)
- 1977: Le Manitoba ne répond plus
- 1978: A Day in Forillon (Une journée à Forillon)
- 1978: Soils of Canada
- 1978: Kouchibouguac
- 1978: The Battle of the Châteauguay (La Bataille de la Châteauguay)
- 1978: Santa Gertrudis, la première question sur le bonheur
- 1978: A Day in Point Pelee
- 1979: La Fiction nucléaire
- 1979: La Loi de la ville
- 1980: Le Deal mexicain
- 1980: De la tourbe et du restant
- 1980: Cordélia
- 1981: Voyage de nuit
- 1982: Comfort and Indifference (Le Confort et l'indifférence)
- 1985: Une guerre dans mon jardin
- 1985: Cochez oui, cochez non
- 1985: Cinéma, cinéma
- 1985: Haiti, Québec
- 1986: Sonia
- 1986: Anne Trister
- 1986: Intimate Power (Pouvoir intime)
- 1986: The Decline of the American Empire (Le Déclin de l'empire américain)
- 1987: Night Zoo (Un zoo la nuit)
- 1989: Jesus of Montreal (Jésus de Montréal)
- 1990: Un autre homme
- 1990: Moody Beach
- 1990: Ding et Dong : le film
- 1992: Phantom Life (La Vie fantôme)
- 1992: Lapse of Memory
- 1992: The Dark Side of the Heart (Le Côté obscur du cœur)
- 1993: Love and Human Remains
- 1995: Water Child (L'Enfant d'eau)
- 1996: Cosmos
- 1996: Not Me! (Sous-sol)
- 1998: The Countess of Baton Rouge (La Comtesse de Bâton Rouge)
- 1998: 2 Seconds (2 secondes)
- 1998: August 32nd on Earth (Un 32 août sur terre)
- 1999: Matroni and Me (Matroni et moi)
- 2000: Mack Sennett: King of Comedy (Mack Sennett, roi du comique)
- 2000: Life After Love (La Vie après l'amour)
- 2000: Maelström
- 2001: Tar Angel (L'Ange de goudron)
- 2002: Chaos and Desire (La Turbulence des fluides)
- 2002: Le Plateau (TV series)
- 2003: How My Mother Gave Birth to Me During Menopause (Comment ma mère accoucha de moi durant sa ménopause)
- 2003: Père et fils
- 2003: Seducing Doctor Lewis (La Grande Séduction)
- 2005: Tango, un giro extraño
- 2005: Life with My Father (La Vie avec mon père)
- 2005: Saint Martyrs of the Damned (Saints-Martyrs-des-Damnés)
- 2006: The Secret Life of Happy People (La Vie secrète des gens heureux)
- 2008: Through the Mist (Dédé, à travers les brumes)
- 2010: Crying Out (À l'origine d'un cri)
- 2012: Liverpool
- 2013: The Grand Seduction
- 2013: Another House (L'autre maison)
- 2020: Chaakapesh
- 2021: The Power of the Dog
- 2023: Tell Me Why These Things Are So Beautiful (Dis-moi pourquoi ces choses sont si belles)
- 2024: Ababooned (Ababouiné)

=== As director ===
- 1971: The Great Ordinary Movie (Le Grand film ordinaire)
- 1973: Unfinished Infonie (L'Infonie inachevée...)
- 1977: Saturday: The Womb of Night (Samedi - Le Ventre de la nuit)
- 1977: Monday: Happiness Is (Lundi - Une chaumière, un cœur)
- 1981: Voyage de nuit
- 1984: The Last Glacier (Le Dernier glacier)
- 2000: Die Fremde
- 2020: Chaakapesh

=== As editor ===
- 1970: The Storm (El Assifa)
- 1971: Pizzagone
- 1971: It Is Necessary to Be Among the Peoples of the World to Know Them (Faut aller parmi l'monde pour le savoir)
- 1974: Unfinished Infonie (L'Infonie inachevée...)

=== As actor ===
- 1973: Réjeanne Padovani : Un militant
- 2003: Father and Sons (Père et fils) : Pharmacien

=== As scriptwriter ===
- 1984: The Last Glacier (Le Dernier glacier)

== Awards and nominations ==
=== Awards ===
- 1987 : Genie Award for Best Motion Picture and Golden Reel Award with René Malo, The Decline of the American Empire
- 1988 : Genie Award for Best Motion Picture with Pierre Gendron, Un Zoo la nuit
- 1990 : Genie Award for Best Motion Picture and Golden Reel Award with Pierre Gendron, Jésus de Montréal
- 1991 : Genie Award Golden Reel Award, Ding et Dong : le film
- 2001 : Genie Award for Best Motion Picture with Luc Vandal, Maelström
- 2022 : Golden Globe Award for Best Motion Picture - Drama, The Power of the Dog

=== Nominations ===
- 1982 : Genie Award for Best Theatrical Short with Carole Mondello, Voyage de nuit
- 1987 : Academy Award for Best Foreign-Language Film with René Malo, The Decline of the American Empire
- 1990 : Academy Award for Best Foreign-Language Film with Pierre Gendron, Jésus de Montréal
- 1991 : BAFTA for Best Film Not in English with Pierre Gendron, Jésus de Montréal
- 1999 : Jutra Award for Best Film, 2 secondes
- 1999 : Jutra Award for Best Film, Un 32 août sur terre
- 2002 : Jutra Award for Best Film with Luc Vandal, L'Ange de goudron
- 2004 : Genie Award for Best Motion Picture with Pierre Grendon, Seducing Doctor Lewis
- 2007 : Jutra Award for Best Film with Luc Vandal
- 2007 : Genie Award for Best Motion Picture, La vie secrète des gens heureux
- 2009 : Jutra Award for Best Film with Luc Vandal, Borderline
- 2014 : Genie Award for Best Film with Barbara Doran, The Grand Seduction
- 2022 : Academy Award for Best Picture with Jane Campion, Tanya Seghatchian, Emile Sherman, and Iain Canning, The Power of the Dog
