= Sonia (1986 film) =

1986 film

- Directed by: Paule Baillargeon
- Written by: Paule Baillargeon; Laura Harrington
- Produced by: Roger Frappier; Michel Gauthier; Suzanne Dussault
- Starring: Kim Yaroshevskaya; Paule Baillargeon
- Cinematography: André-Luc Dupont; Roger Martin
- Edited by: Yves Dion
- Music by: Yves Laferrière
- Production company: National Film Board of Canada
- Release date: June 15, 1986
- Running time: 54 minutes
- Country: Canada
- Language: French

Sonia is a Canadian drama film, written and directed by Paule Baillargeon and released in 1986. The film stars Kim Yaroshevskaya as Sonia, a successful artist and academic whose independence is being eroded by the onset of Alzheimer's disease, and Baillargeon as her daughter Roxanne.

The cast also includes Lothaire Bluteau, Paul Buissonneau, Michael Rudder, Raymond Cloutier, Marc Messier, Blanche Baillargeon, Frédérique Collin, Suzanne Gaulin, Louise St-Pierre and Guy Thauvette. Filmmaker Claude Jutra had also been cast in a small part as the doctor who diagnosed Sonia's condition, but his performance had to be left out of the finished film as his own battle with Alzheimer's interfered with his ability to remember his lines.

The film premiered on June 15, 1986, at the International Festival of Women's Film and Video in Montreal, Quebec. Its subsequent screenings included the 1987 Rendez-vous du cinéma québécois, where it was the winner of the Prix André-Leroux for best mid-length film.
