= 1982 in Canadian television =

This is a list of Canadian television related events from 1982.

== Events ==
Date	Event
January 11	In a move to boost ratings CBC Television moves The National to 10:00pm and launches a newsmagazine called The Journal that followed The National at 10:30 pm.
March 27	3rd Genie Awards.
April 14	Juno Awards of 1982.

=== Debuts ===
Show	Station	Premiere Date
Lorne Greene's New Wilderness	CTV	January 11
The Journal	CBC Television	January 11
Today's Special	TVOntario	September 1
The Edison Twins	CBC Television	Unknown
Maamuitaau	CBC North	Unknown

=== Ending this year ===
Show	Station	Cancelled
The Great Detective	CBC Television	March 4
This Land	CBC Television	August 31
Canada: The Great Experiment	TVOntario	Unknown

== Births ==
- May 16 - Melissa Altro, actress and voice actress (Arthur)
- June 19 - Michael Yarmush, the original voice actor for Arthur from Seasons 1–5 on Arthur
- July 8 - Ariel Helwani, sports journalist
- August 20 – Meghan Ory, actress
- October 29 - Chelan Simmons, actress and former model

== Television shows ==
=== 1950s ===
- Country Canada (1954–2007)
- The Friendly Giant (1958–1985)
- Hockey Night in Canada (1952–present)
- The National (1954–present)
- Front Page Challenge (1957–1995)
- Wayne and Shuster Show (1958–1989)

=== 1960s ===
- CTV National News (1961–present)
- Land and Sea (1964–present)
- Man Alive (1967–2000)
- Mr. Dressup (1967–1996)
- The Nature of Things (1960–present, scientific documentary series)
- Question Period (1967–present, news program)
- Reach for the Top (1961–1985)
- Take 30 (1962–1983)
- The Tommy Hunter Show (1965–1992)
- University of the Air (1966–1983)
- W-FIVE (1966–present, newsmagazine program)

=== 1970s ===
- The Beachcombers (1972–1990)
- Canada AM (1972–present, news program)
- Celebrity Cooks (1975–1984)
- City Lights (1973–1989)
- Definition (1974–1989)
- the fifth estate (1975–present, newsmagazine program)
- Headline Hunters (1972–1983)
- Let's Go (1976–1984)
- The Littlest Hobo (1979–1985)
- Live It Up! (1978–1990)
- The Mad Dash (1978–1985)
- Marketplace (1972–present, newsmagazine program)
- Polka Dot Door (1971-1993)
- Read All About It! (1979–1983)
- Second City Television (1976–1984)
- Smith & Smith (1979–1985)
- You Can't Do That on Television (1979–1990)
- V.I.P. (1973–1983)
- 100 Huntley Street (1977–present, religious program)

=== 1980s ===
- The Alan Thicke Show (1980–1983)
- Bizarre (1980–1985)
- The Frantics (1981–1984)
- Hangin' In (1981–1987)
- Home Fires (1980–1983)
- Seeing Things (1981–1987)
- Switchback (1981–1990)
- Thrill of a Lifetime (1981–1987)

== TV movies ==
- Becoming Laura
- Blind Faith
- By Reason of Insanity
- The Hawk
- High Card
- An Honourable Member

== Television stations ==
=== Debuts ===
Date	Market	Station	Channel	Affiliation	Notes/References
Unknown	Saguenay, Quebec	CIVV-TV	8	Télé-Québec	
Unknown	Sherbrooke, Quebec	CIVS-TV	14	Télé-Québec	

== See also ==
- 1982 in Canada
- List of Canadian films of 1982
