= The Fat Woman Next Door Is Pregnant =

1978 novel by Canadian author Michel Tremblay

First edition (publ. Leméac Inc)

The Fat Woman Next Door is Pregnant (originally published in French as La grosse femme d'à côté est enceinte, and translated into English by Sheila Fischman in 1981) is a 1978 novel by Canadian author Michel Tremblay. The story takes place over the course of a single day, May 2, 1942, in the Plateau Mont-Royal neighbourhood of Montreal, which at the time was predominantly French-speaking. It focuses on several working-class families as well as two prostitutes. It is known across the francophonie as one of the great Canadian pieces of French language literature, utilizing the unique Canadian dialect of French to express the issues of the early and mid-twentieth century in Québec and abroad.

The work has strong feminist themes which tie into a pattern in Tremblay's work of focusing on the struggle of the every day woman.
