= Lessons on Life =

1989 Canadian film directed by Jacques Leduc

- French: Trois pommes à côté du sommeil
- Directed by: Jacques Leduc
- Written by: Jacques Leduc; Michel Langlois
- Produced by: Suzanne Dussault; Pierre Latour; René Malo
- Starring: Normand Chouinard; Paule Baillargeon
- Cinematography: Pierre Letarte
- Edited by: Pierre Bernier
- Music by: René Lussier; Jean Derome
- Production company: Malofilm Productions
- Release date: August 24, 1989 (MWFF)
- Running time: 98 minutes
- Country: Canada
- Language: French

Lessons on Life (French: Trois pommes à côté du sommeil) is a Canadian drama film, directed by Jacques Leduc and released in 1989. The film stars Normand Chouinard as an unnamed magazine journalist who is reflecting on his life, and the important influence of three women on it, on the occasion of his 40th birthday.

The cast also includes Paule Baillargeon, Paule Marier, Hubert Reeves, Marcel Sabourin, Guy Nadon, Marie-Josée Gauthier, Frédérique Collin and France Castel.

The film won the Prix Luc-Perreault from the Association québécoise des critiques de cinéma at the Rendez-vous du cinéma québécois in 1990.
