= 24th Canadian Film Awards =

Canadian film awards ceremony

- Date: October 3, 1972
- Location: Cinesphere, Toronto, Ontario
- Hosted by: Jacques Fauteux

Highlights
- Most awards: La vraie nature de Bernadette (The True Nature of Bernadette)
- Best Picture: Wedding in White

The 24th Canadian Film Awards were held on October 3, 1972 to honour achievements in Canadian film.

The CFAs had the full support of French-speaking filmmakers, with Quebec producers agreeing to join the CFA committee and share responsibility for the future direction of the organization, which had opened an office in Montreal.

A total of 147 films were submitted and a pre-selection committee chose 62 of them for final consideration. Due to the number of categories, the ceremony was split into two events: non-feature, sponsored, and educational film awards were presented at a luncheon, while all other awards were presented at a gala banquet. The ceremonies were fully bilingual and awards were divided equally between francophone and anglophone producers. The ceremony was hosted by broadcaster Jacques Fauteux.

== Winners ==
=== Films ===
- Film of the Year: Not awarded
- Feature Film: Wedding in White — Dermet Productions, John Vidette producer, William Fruet director
- Documentary: Selling Out — Unit Productions, Tadeusz Jaworski director and producer
- Theatrical Short: This Is a Photograph — National Film Board of Canada, Tom Daly producer, Albert Kish director
- Animated: Dans la vie... — National Film Board of Canada, René Jodoin producer, Pierre Veilleux director
- TV Drama: Françoise Durocher, Waitress — National Film Board of Canada, Pierre Duceppe and Jean-Marc Garand producers, André Brassard director
- TV Information: Je chante à cheval avec Willie Lamothe — National Film Board of Canada - Paul Larose producer, Jacques Leduc and Lucien Ménard directors
- Nature and Wildlife: Solitudes - Dan Gibson's Nature Family — Dan Gibson Productions, Dan Gibson producer and director
- Travel and Recreation: Images de la Gaspésie — Office du film du Québec, Jacques Parent producer, Jean-Claude Labrecque director, and

Les Jeux D'été du Quebec MCMLXXI — Office du film du Québec, Jean Robitaille and Pierre Desmarchais directors

- Public Relations: In Flight — Foster Advertising, Peter Gerretsen director
- Sales Promotion: A Powerful Ally — Hydro Quebec, Nicholas Bornemisza director
- Training and Instruction: Child Behaviour Equals You — Crawley Films, F.R. Crawley producer, Peter Cock director

=== Feature film craft awards ===
- Performance by a Lead Actor: Gordon Pinsent - The Rowdyman — (Crawley Films)
- Performance by a Lead Actress: Micheline Lanctôt - La vraie nature de Bernadette (The True Nature of Bernadette) (CFDC, Carle-Lamy Ltée.)
- Supporting Actor: Donald Pilon - La vraie nature de Bernadette (The True Nature of Bernadette)
- Supporting Actress: Doris Petrie - Wedding in White (Dermet Productions)
- Art Direction: Karen Bromley - Wedding in White
- Cinematography: Michel Brault - Le Temps d'une chasse (The Time of the Hunt) (NFB)
- Direction: Gilles Carle - La vraie nature de Bernadette (The True Nature of Bernadette)
- Film Editing: Danielle Gagné - La Vie rêvée (Dream Life) (ACPAV)
- Sound Editing: Honor Griffith and John Kelly - Journey (Quest Film Productions)
- Music Score: Pierre F. Brault - La vraie nature de Bernadette (The True Nature of Bernadette)
- Original Screenplay: Gilles Carle - La vraie nature de Bernadette (The True Nature of Bernadette)
- Overall Sound: Claude Hazanavicius (re-recording) - Le Temps d'une chasse (The Time of the Hunt) (NFB, and

Paul Coombe and Ian Jacobson (re-recording) - Face-Off (Agincourt International)

=== Non-feature craft awards ===
- Performance by a Lead Actor: Sean Sullivan - Springhill (CBC)
- Performance by a Lead Actress: Patricia Collins - The Golden Handshake (CBC)
- Art Direction: Harold Maxfield - Springhill (CBC)
- Cinematography: Georges Dufaux - À cris perdus (Cries from Within) (NFB)
- Direction: André Brassard - Françoise Durocher, Waitress (NFB)
- Film Editing: James N. Williams - Prologue to Power
- Sound Editing: Les Halman - Wet Earth and Warm People (NFB)
- Music Score: Larry Crosley - Journey to Power (Crawley Films)
- Screenplay: Michel Tremblay - Françoise Durocher, Waitress (NFB)
- Non-Dramatic Script: Chester Ronning - A Journey Forward: Chester Ronning in China
- Sound Recording: Claude Delorme - Wet Earth and Warm People
- Sound Re-Recording: Michel Descombes - This Is a Photograph (NFB)

=== Special awards ===
- Francis Mankiewicz - Le Temps d'une chasse (The Time of the Hunt)
- Office du film du Québec - Un petit canard pas comme les autres
- Wendy Michener Award: Mireille Dansereau - "for outstanding artistic achievement in La Vie rêvée (Dream Life)
- Grierson Award: Colin Low - "for outstanding contributions to Canadian cinema".
