= Conquest (1998 film) =

- Directed by: Piers Haggard
- Written by: Rob Forsyth
- Produced by: Christina Jennings; Stephen Onda
- Starring: Lothaire Bluteau; Tara Fitzgerald; Monique Mercure; David Fox; Eugene Lipinski
- Cinematography: Gerald Packer
- Edited by: Ralph Brunjes
- Music by: Ron Sures
- Production companies: Greenpoint Films; Heartland Motion Pictures; Shaftesbury Films
- Distributed by: Oasis International
- Release date: August 1998
- Running time: 94 minutes
- Countries: Canada; United Kingdom
- Language: English

Conquest is a 1998 British-Canadian romantic comedy film set in the dying prairie town of Conquest, Saskatchewan, where the remaining residents are in their 70s and depressed. Thirty-two-year-old Pincer Bedier (Lothaire Bluteau), the French-Canadian manager of the only bank branch in the town, dreams of reviving the town and its only cash crop, the edible pea pods of the Caragana bush. Daisy MacDonald (Tara Fitzgerald), a young, beautiful and mysterious English or Australian woman, happens into town in her bright red Alfa Romeo sports car. When it stalls, she finds herself stranded indefinitely until the needed parts can be shipped in. Her presence invigorates the town and its inhabitants and romance develops between her and the young banker, while the older inhabitants catch his vision of the future.

Conquest was shown at the 1998 Montreal World Film Festival. In 1999 Monique Mercure won the Genie Award for Best Performance by an Actress in a Supporting Role, that of Grace Gallagher. Conquest has been shown on the Showtime network in the United States.

== Cast ==
- Lothaire Bluteau as Pincer Bedier
- Tara Fitzgerald as Daisy MacDonald
- Monique Mercure as Grace Gallagher
- David Fox as Carl Gallagher
- Eugene Lipinski as Glenn Boychuk
- Daniel MacDonald as Erwin Boychuk
- Quyen Hua as My Lang
- John Bourgeois as Morley
- Susan Williamson as Margaret
- Chrisse Bornstein as Dorothy
- Jean Freeman as Betty
