= Trente tableaux =

- Directed by: Paule Baillargeon
- Release date: 2011
- Running time: 81 minutes

Trente tableaux (lit. Thirty paintings/pictures) is a 2011 Canadian autobiographical feature documentary film by director Paule Baillargeon, made during her two-year film residency with the National Film Board of Canada. It is an anthology film composed of 30 short portraits—or tableau vivant—of her 66 years of life to date, reflecting her experiences as a woman in Quebec's changing society.

== Content ==
The film explores Baillargeon's feminist and sovereigntist views, her struggles with her depression, her childhood, the great landscapes of her native Abitibi-Témiscamingue, her daughter Blanche and her close relationship with her dog, Watam. She revisits pivotal moments in her life, including her experiences while directing her controversial 1979 film, La cuisine rouge, in which her actresses, inspired by the film's feminist message, insisted on improvising the end of the film.

== Release ==
The film had its world premiere in October 2011 in Montreal, at the Festival du nouveau cinéma.
