= Angèle Coutu =

Canadian actress

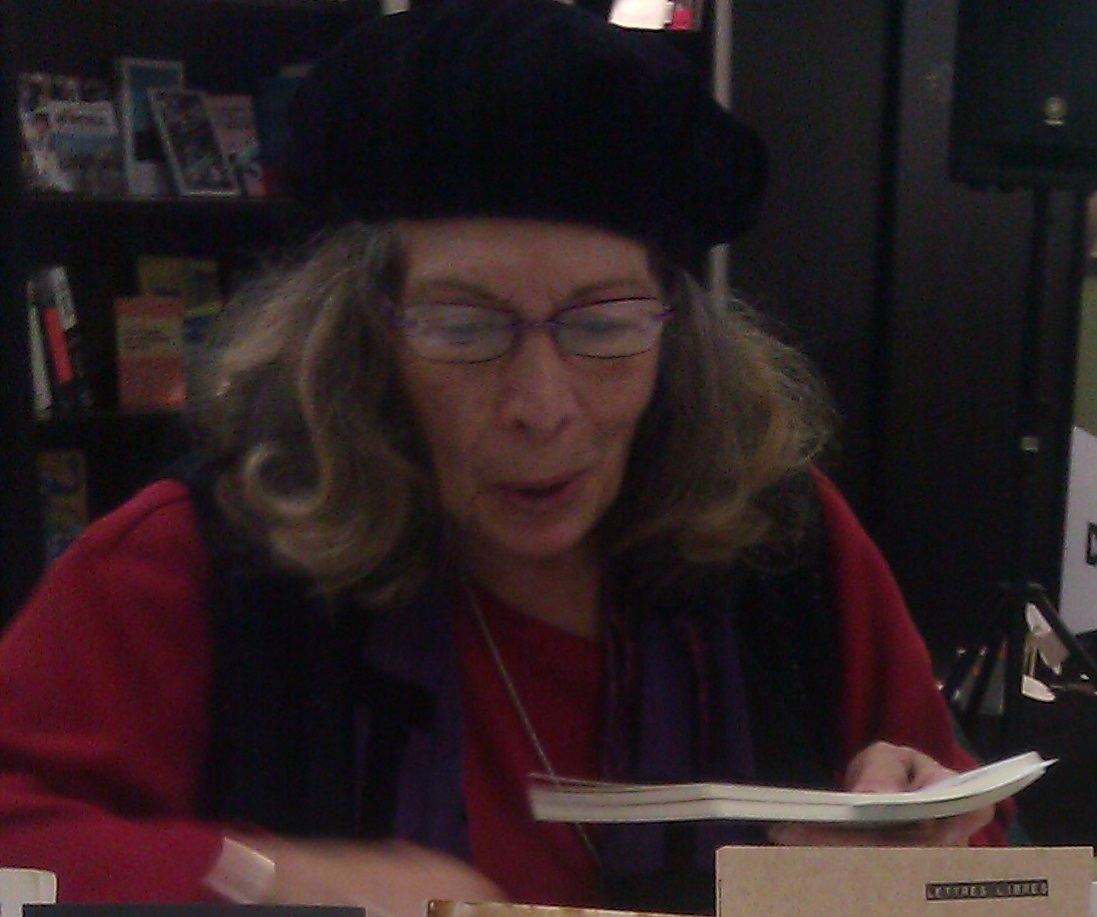
- Born: February 6, 1946 (age 80); Montreal, Quebec
- Occupation: actress
- Years active: 1970s-present
- Notable work: Two's a Crowd, Borderline

Angèle Coutu (born February 6, 1946) is a Canadian actress from Quebec. She is most noted for her performance in the film Borderline, for which she won the Jutra Award for Best Supporting Actress at the 11th Jutra Awards in 2009, and her long-running television role in the series Two's a Crowd (Jamais deux sans toi).

The daughter of actor Jean Coutu, she graduated from the Conservatoire d'art dramatique de Montréal in 1966.

Her other credits have included the films Sex in the Snow (Après-ski), The Conquest (La Conquête), Françoise Durocher, Waitress, O.K. ... Laliberté, In the Shadow of the Wind (Les Fous de Bassan), Deaf to the City (Le Sourd dans la ville), You're Beautiful, Jeanne (T'es belle, Jeanne), In the Belly of the Dragon (Dans le ventre du dragon), The Party, Family History (Histoire de famille), The Legacy (La Donation), Wetlands (Marécages), A Place to Live (Pour vivre ici), Saint-Narcisse and The Sticky Side of Baklava (La Face cachée du baklava).
