= Paule Baillargeon =

Canadian actress and film director

- Born: July 19, 1945 (age 80); Rouyn-Noranda, Quebec
- Occupations: Film director Actress; Screenwriter
- Years active: 1970 - Present

Paule Baillargeon (born July 19, 1945) is a Canadian actress and film director. She won the Genie Award for Best Supporting Actress for her role in the film I've Heard the Mermaids Singing, and was a nominee for Best Director for The Sex of the Stars (Le Sexe des étoiles). Her film roles have included August 32nd on Earth (Un 32 août sur terre), Jesus of Montreal (Jésus de Montréal), A Woman in Transit (La Femme de l'hôtel), Réjeanne Padovani and Days of Darkness (L'Âge des ténèbres).

Baillargeon received a classical education at the Ursuline Convent in Quebec City and at the École Sophie-Barat in Montreal. She left the National Theatre School of Canada in 1969 without graduating and, along with Raymond Cloutier and others, founded the experimental theatre group Le Grand Cirque Ordinaire. For several years she participated in writing and performing in its collective creations, which had a marked effect on the theatre of Quebec during the late 1960s and early 1970s. The Great Ordinary Movie (Le Grand film ordinaire), released in 1971, is a documentary based on its first performance piece. Although the collective disbanded after its second film, Montreal Blues, Baillargeon’s key 1980 film co-directed with Frédérique Collin, La Cuisine rouge, adapted Le Grand Cirque’s Brechtian style to a fractured narrative about sexual stereotyping.

In 2002, she directed an NFB documentary about her friend, Claude Jutra. In 2009, Baillargeon was appointed as a filmmaker in residence by the National Film Board of Canada (NFB). In 2011, the NFB released her autobiographical work Trente tableaux, an anthology film composed of 30 filmic portraits of her 66 years of life to date, including her experiences as a woman in Quebec's changing society.

She has received Quebec's two highest film honours: the Prix Albert-Tessier in 2009 and the 2012 Jutra Award for lifetime achievement.

== Filmography ==
=== As director ===
- Anastasie, oh! ma chérie - short film, 1977
- La cuisine rouge - co-directed with Frédérique Collin, 1980
- Sonia - short film, 1986
- Solo - TV movie, 1991
- Le complexe d'Édith - short film, 1991
- The Sex of the Stars (Le sexe des étoiles) - 1993
- Une famille comme les autres - TV documentary series, 1999-2000
- Claude Jutra, portrait sur film - documentary, 2002
- Jean-Pierre Perreault: Giant Steps (Le petit Jean-Pierre, le grand Perreault) - documentary short, 2004
- Un cri au bonheur - anthology film, co-directed with various, 2007, aka Et il y avait la poésie
- Trente tableaux - feature documentary, 2011

=== As actress ===
- The Great Ordinary Movie (Le Grand film ordinaire) - 1971
- Montreal Blues - 1972
- Réjeanne Padovani - 1973
- Before the Time Comes (Le Temps de l'avant) - 1975
- Confidences of the Night (L'Amour blessé) - 1975
- Gina - 1975
- The Vultures (Les Vautours) - 1975
- East End Hustle - 1976
- The Late Blossom (Le soleil se lève en retard) - 1977
- Panic (Panique) - 1977
- A Woman in Transit (La Femme de l'hôtel) - 1984
- The Dame in Colour (La Dame en couleurs) - 1985
- I've Heard the Mermaids Singing - 1987
- Jesus of Montreal (Jésus de Montréal) - 1989
- Lessons on Life (Trois pommes à côté du sommeil) - 1989
- Four Stiffs and a Trombone (L'assassin jouait du trombone) - 1991
- Love Me (Love-moi) - 1991
- Les Héritiers Duval - 1995-96
- August 32nd on Earth (Un 32 août sur terre) - 1998
- Ma voisine danse le ska - 2003
- A Family Secret (Le Secret de ma mère) - 2006
- Days of Darkness (L'Âge des ténèbres) - 2007
- Mourning for Anna (Trois temps après la mort d'Anna) - 2010

== See also ==
- List of female film and television directors
- List of LGBT-related films directed by women
