= This Is No Time for Romance =

1967 film

- French: Ça n'est pas le temps des romans
- Directed by: Fernand Dansereau
- Written by: Fernand Dansereau
- Starring: Monique Mercure; Marc Favreau
- Cinematography: Thomas Vámos
- Music by: Georges Dor
- Production company: National Film Board of Canada
- Release date: 1967
- Running time: 28 minutes
- Country: Canada
- Language: French

This Is No Time for Romance (French: Ça n'est pas le temps des romans) is a Canadian short drama film, directed by Fernand Dansereau and released in 1967. An exploration of the changing role of women in the early years of feminism, the film stars Monique Mercure as Madeleine, a housewife who is beginning to resent being defined by her relationship to her husband Gervais (Marc Favreau) and their children, and daydreams about possible alternative life paths she could have taken.

The film won the Canadian Film Award for Best Film Under 30 Minutes at the 20th Canadian Film Awards in 1968.
