= Françoise Durocher, Waitress =

1972 Canadian film directed by André Brassard

- Genre: Drama
- Written by: Michel Tremblay
- Directed by: André Brassard
- Country of origin: Canada
- Original language: French

Production
- Producers: Pierre Duceppe; Jean-Marc Garand
- Cinematography: Thomas Vámos
- Editor: André Brassard
- Running time: 30 minutes
- Production company: National Film Board of Canada

Original release
- Network: Radio-Canada
- Release: October 1972

Françoise Durocher, Waitress is a 1972 Canadian dramatic television film, directed by André Brassard. The film presents a portrait of Françoise Durocher, a waitress at a diner in Quebec, as portrayed by 24 different actresses and one male actor in drag over the course of seven monologues.

The performers playing Durocher over the course of the film include Odette Gagnon, Rita Lafontaine, Christine Olivier, Louisette Dussault, Sophie Clément, Luce Guilbeault, Michelle Rossignol, Frédérique Collin, Carmen Tremblay, Hélène Loiselle, Amulette Garneau, Monique Mercure, Mirielle Lachance, Sylvie Heppel, Denise Proulx, Denise Morelle, Ève Gagnier, Anne-Marie Ducharme, Katerine Mousseau, Véronique Le Flaguais, Angèle Coutu, Denise de Jaguère, Suzelle Collette, Huguette Gervais and Normand Morin.

The film won three Canadian Film Awards at the 24th Canadian Film Awards, for Best TV Drama, Best Direction in a Non-Feature (Brassard) and Best Screenplay in a Non-Feature (Michel Tremblay).
