= The Time of the Hunt =

1972 drama film

- French: Le Temps d'une chasse
- Directed by: Francis Mankiewicz
- Written by: Francis Mankiewicz
- Produced by: Pierre Gauvreau
- Starring: Guy L'Écuyer; Marcel Sabourin; Pierre Dufresne; Olivier L'Écuyer
- Cinematography: Michel Brault
- Edited by: Werner Nold
- Music by: Pierre F. Brault
- Production company: National Film Board of Canada
- Release date: August 30, 1972 (Venice)
- Running time: 97 minutes
- Country: Canada
- Language: French

The Time of the Hunt (French: Le Temps d'une chasse) is a Canadian drama film, directed by Francis Mankiewicz and released in 1972. An examination of masculinity, the film centres on Willy (Guy L'Écuyer), Richard (Marcel Sabourin) and Lionel (Pierre Dufresne), three friends on a weekend hunting trip who are instructing Richard's son Michel (Olivier L'Écuyer) in the rituals and practices of what they believe it means to be a man.

The film's cast also includes Frédérique Collin, Luce Guilbeault, Amulette Garneau and Monique Mercure.

The film won three Canadian Film Awards at the 24th Canadian Film Awards ceremony, for Best Cinematography (Michel Brault), Best Sound (Claude Hazanavicius) and a special achievement award for Mankiewicz.

It was later screened at the 1984 Festival of Festivals as part of Front & Centre, a special retrospective program of artistically and culturally significant films from throughout the history of Canadian cinema.
