= Dans la vie... =

- Directed by: Pierre Veilleux
- Written by: Pierre Veilleux
- Produced by: René Jodoin
- Animation by: Pierre Veilleux
- Production company: National Film Board of Canada
- Release date: 1972
- Running time: 5 minutes
- Country: Canada

Dans la vie... is a Canadian animated short film, directed by Pierre Veilleux and released in 1972. The film portrays a surreal world in which objects come to life.

It won the Canadian Film Award for Best Animated Short at the 24th Canadian Film Awards.
