= Béatrice Picard =

Canadian actress (1929–2025)

Béatrice Picard CM OQ
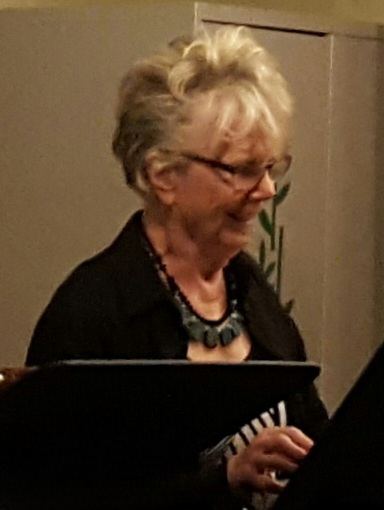
- Picard in 2017
- Born: July 3, 1929; Montreal, Quebec, Canada
- Died: December 9, 2025 (aged 96)
- Occupation: Actress

Marie Thérèse Béatrice Picard CM OQ (July 3, 1929 – December 9, 2025) was a Canadian actress whose career spanned over six decades. She became known for her role as Angelina Desmarais in one of the first French Canadian "télé-roman" series called Le survenant in the early days of French-speaking television. She then went on to a prolific career in televised comedies such as Cré Basil and Symphorien. She also played in numerous theatre productions, summer plays, and films. She is well known as the Quebec French voice of Marge Simpson in The Simpsons.

Picard received the title of "Miss Radio, Télévision et Cinéma Monde" in 1958. She was a nominee in the 2008 Genie Awards for Best Lead Actress in My Aunt Aline (Ma tante Aline) in which she plays the title character.

She was appointed a Member of the Order of Canada (CM) in 1988, in recognition of her "significant contribution to theatre in Quebec." In 2012, she was made an Officer of the National Order of Quebec (OQ). She was also awarded the Queen Elizabeth II Golden Jubilee Medal and Queen Elizabeth II Diamond Jubilee Medal in 2002 and 2012 respectively.

Picard died in her sleep on December 9, 2025, at the age of 96.

== Filmography ==
| Year | Title | Role | Notes |
|---|---|---|---|
| 1959 | Les 90 jours | Laurette Gagnon | |
| 1973 | Taureau | Mme Larivee | |
| 1974 | Once Upon a Time in the East | Robertine | |
| 1987 | Deaf to the City | Florence | |
| 2002 | The Negro | Cedulie | |
| 2004 | Le golem de Montréal | La grand-mère | |
| 2007 | My Aunt Aline | Aline St-Louis | |
| 2007 | The Simpsons Movie | Marge Simpson | Voice; French-Canadian dub |
| 2017 | Marguerite | Marguerite | Short film |
| 2017 | Coco | Mamá Coco | Voice; French-Canadian dub |
| 2023 | Frontiers | Helena Messier | |
