= Speak white =

Expression with racial undertones used to command French speakers to speak English

The expression speak white is used to order someone to speak English. With racial undertones, this imperative phraseme was claimed to have been mainly used during the 20th century against French-speaking Canadians. The insult was adopted in Quebec nationalist literature and notably served as the title of a famous poem written by Michèle Lalonde in 1968.

== Historical usage of the expression ==
The first reported use of the expression speak white is claimed to date back to October 12, 1889. During debates in the House of Commons of Canada, anglophone MPs would have shouted "Speak White!" at francophone MP Henri Bourassa. However, according to Canadian anglophone journalist William Johnson, Bourassa had not been elected at that time, and records of a controversial speech he made on the subject of the Boer War, where he was shouted at by MPs show that he was speaking English and no one used that phrase against him. Quebec francophone linguist Gabriel Martin concurs with this interpretation. According to him, the expression speak white is attested in Canada starting in the 1920s and its usage intensified during the 1944 conscription crisis:

During the Second World War, debates over mandatory military service deepened the divide between the country's two major linguistic communities. While anglophones were largely in favor of conscription, francophones generally opposed it. In this context the expression speak white became increasingly common in military circles, often hurled at those contemptuously referred to as zombies or frogs. In 1942, Quebec minister René Chaloult repeatedly denounced the presence of signs bearing the words Speak White in certain areas under Canadian naval control.

According to the linguist, testimonies from francophone Canadians reporting being told to speak white stretch into the 1980s, although the expression has become marginal in the 21st century.

On March 7, 2007, conservative journalist Larry Zolf wrote an article entitled "Speak White" published on the CBC News website, claiming that in his childhood in Winnipeg, Canadians would often shout "Speak white!" at his mother when she spoke to him in Yiddish. In the same article, Zolf criticized then Liberal Party candidate Stéphane Dion—who is francophone—by addressing the same "speak white" insult to Dion.

== Artistic and political use of speak white ==
From the 1950s to the 1970s, nationalist intellectuals in Quebec often drew on the vocabulary of négritude to describe the oppression experienced by francophones in the province. Pierre Vallières’s essay Nègres blancs d’Amérique famously compared the linguistic and socio-economic discrimination faced by French-speaking Quebecers to the racism endured by Black Americans and the colonial domination imposed on subjugated peoples of colonial empires. Some Quebec nationalists aligned themselves with a broader anti-imperialist movement, of which négritude was one expression, and denounced the oppression of one people by another through language and culture.

The expression speak white was common in Quebec literature in the period. For instance, it appears in the work of Yves Thériault in 1954 to denounce the dominance of English over Yiddish, and in Gaston Miron’s work in 1965 to highlight anglophone contempt toward francophones.

=== Speak White by Michèle Lalonde ===
The expression inspired Quebec poet Michèle Lalonde to write the committed poem Speak White in October 1968. It was first published in the magazine Socialisme in December 1968 and publicly read during the Nuit de la poésie in Montreal on March 27, 1970, which greatly contributed to its notoriety. Written as a collective monologue, the poem denounces linguistic, cultural, and economic domination between anglophones and francophones in Quebec. The phrase speak white, used as the title and repeated throughout the poem, symbolizes the linguistic, economic and intellectual marginalization of francophones. The poem was published as a poster-poem in 1974 by Éditions de l’Hexagone and has been translated, adapted into film, and recorded. It also inspired reinterpretations, including Marco Micone’s 1989 poem Speak What, which sparked controversy. Speak White is often cited as a representative work of Quebec’s linguistic and political history.

=== Contemporary views ===
In the 21st century, the legitimacy of the artistic and political use of speak white is a controversial topic. Anthropologist Emilie Nicolas, who studied Lalonde’s poem, argues that using the "vocabulary of négritude to speak about francophones in Canada" constitutes a "false equivalence" that trivializes slavery and racism, thus negating its historical usage to qualify francophones. Journalist Pierre Dubuc finds Nicolas’s position "astonishing" and "totally ahistorical," noting that "in the early 1960s, the socio-economic conditions of Quebec workers resembled those of Black Americans." Linguist Gabriel Martin emphasizes that Michèle Lalonde sought to "highlight the fusion of linguistic contempt and racism underlying the expression [speak white]."
