= Guy Thauvette =

Canadian actor

- Born: March 19, 1944 (age 81); Pointe-des-Cascades, Quebec
- Occupation: Actor
- Years active: 1960s-present
- Notable work: A Sunday in Kigali, Infiltration

Guy Thauvette (born March 19, 1944) is a Canadian actor from Pointe-des-Cascades, Quebec. He is most noted for his performance in the film Infiltration (Le problème d'infiltration), for which he was a Prix Iris nominee for Best Supporting Actor at the 20th Quebec Cinema Awards in 2018, as well as his performance as Gen. Roméo Dallaire in the film A Sunday in Kigali (Une dimanche à Kigali).

== Filmography ==
Year	Title	Role	Notes
1967	The Big Rock (Le Grand Rock)		
1971	The Great Ordinary Movie (Le Grand film ordinaire)		
1972	Montreal Blues		
1975	Confidences of the Night (L'Amour blessé)		
1976	The Absence (L'Absence)	François	
1977	The Machine Age (L'Âge de la machine)		
1980	The Handyman (L'Homme à tout faire)	Card player	
1980	The Red Kitchen (La cuisine rouge)	Thibault Frenette	
1983	Lucien Brouillard		
1983	Maria Chapdelaine	Esdras	
1985	Pale Face (Visage pâle)	Richard	
1986	Anne Trister	Thomas	
1986	Sonia		
1987	And Then You Die		
1987	Brother André (Le Frère André)	Dr. Parizeau	
1987	In the Shadow of the Wind (Les Fous de Bassan)	Patrick Atkins	
1988	The Rainbow Warrior Conspiracy	Manignet	
1989	Sous les draps, les étoiles		
1990	Blizzard (Rafales)		
1990	Cargo	Marcel	
1992	La Fenêtre	Louis	
1993	Thirty Two Short Films About Glenn Gould	Trucker #2	
2002	Waterfront Dreams (Au fil de l'eau)	Simon	
2002	Catch Me If You Can	Warden Garren	
2004	L'Espérance	Valentin Deuxmontagnes	
2004	Looking for Alexander (Mémoires affectives)	Joseph	
2006	A Sunday in Kigali (Un dimanche à Kigali)	Roméo Dallaire	
2006	A Family Secret (Le Secret de ma mère)	Jos	
2008	A No-Hit No-Run Summer (Un été sans point ni coup sûr)	M. Audet	
2008	Mesrine: Killer Instinct (L'instinct de mort)	Le directeur de l'USC	
2008	The Deserter (Le Déserteur)	Pierre Lacasse	
2012	L'Affaire Dumont	Judge Michel Proulx	
2013	Vic and Flo Saw a Bear (Vic+Flo ont vu un ours)	Yvon Champagne	
2014	The Outlaw League (La gang des hors-la-loi)	Jérémie	
2015	Endorphine	Mr. Porter	
2017	Barefoot at Dawn (Pieds nus dans l'aube)	Oncle Richard	
2017	Infiltration (Le problème d'infiltration)	Turcotte	
2019	Cash Nexus	Emmanuel	
2019	I'll End Up in Jail (Je finirai en prison)	Ti-B Gaboury	
2020	Mafia Inc.	Judge	
2020	The Vinland Club (Le Club Vinland)	Frère Rosea	
2021	Norbourg		
2023	The Nature of Love (Simple comme Sylvain)		
2023	Red Rooms (Les chambres rouges)		
