= The Conquest (1973 film) =

1973 Canadian film

- French: La Conquête
- Directed by: Jacques Gagné
- Written by: Michèle Lalonde
- Produced by: Jacques Gagné
- Starring: Michelle Rossignol; Gilles Renaud
- Cinematography: Jean-Claude Labrecque
- Edited by: Jacques Gagné
- Music by: Michel Hinton
- Production company: Les Productions Carle-Lamy
- Distributed by: France Film
- Release date: February 16, 1973
- Running time: 97 minutes
- Country: Canada
- Language: French

The Conquest (French: La Conquête) is a Canadian romantic drama film, written and directed by Jacques Gagné and released in 1973. The film stars Michelle Rossignol and Gilles Renaud as Françoise and Laurent, a sociologist and an art professor in Quebec City who meet and fall in love despite the fact that both are married to other people.

The cast also includes Raymond Bouchard, Jean Brousseau, Jocelyn Bérubé, Raymond Cloutier, Frédérique Collin, Angèle Coutu, Michel Daigle, Rémy Girard, Nicole Leblanc, Lubomir Mykytiuk, François Tassé and Marie Tifo in supporting roles.

The film's screenplay was written by Michèle Lalonde.

The film was entered into competition at the 24th Canadian Film Awards in 1972, before going into commercial release in 1973.
