= A Scream from Silence =

1979 film

- Film poster
- French: Mourir à tue-tête
- Directed by: Anne Claire Poirier
- Written by: Anne Claire Poirier; Marthe Blackburn
- Produced by: Jacques Gagné; Anne Claire Poirier
- Starring: Julie Vincent
- Cinematography: Michel Brault
- Edited by: André Corriveau
- Music by: Maurice Blackburn
- Distributed by: National Film Board of Canada
- Release date: 18 May 1979
- Running time: 96 minutes
- Country: Canada
- Language: French
- Budget: $362,861

A Scream from Silence (French: Mourir à tue-tête) is a 1979 Canadian drama film directed by Anne Claire Poirier and starring Julie Vincent. It competed in the Un Certain Regard section at the 1979 Cannes Film Festival. The film was selected as the Canadian entry for the Best Foreign Language Film at the 52nd Academy Awards, but was not accepted as a nominee.

It was later screened at the 1984 Festival of Festivals as part of Front & Centre, a special retrospective program of artistically and culturally significant films from throughout the history of Canadian cinema.

== Plot ==
A young nurse named Suzanne is kidnapped, assaulted, and brutally raped in the back of a truck by a misogynist stranger. The nurse's rape and the aftermath are part of a film which a director and her editor are working on. From time to time, they pause the film to discuss their intentions and reactions to the film they are making. Mixed in with the story is documentary footage of the stories of other women who have been raped around the world.

== Cast ==
- Julie Vincent as Suzanne
- Germain Houde as Le violeur
- Paul Savoie as Philippe
- Monique Miller as La réalisatrice
- Micheline Lanctôt as La monteuse
- Luce Guilbeault as Une cliente
- Christiane Raymond as La disciple
- Louise Portal as La comédienne
- Muriel Dutil as L'epouse (as Murielle Dutil)
- Julie Morand as La secrétaire
- Pierre Gobeil as Le policier
- Jean-Pierre Masson as Voice
- Michèle Mercure as La soeur de Philippe
- Léo Munger as Une violée
- André Pagé as Le gynécologue

== Production ==
The film had a budget of $362,861 (equivalent to $1,425,137 in 2023).

== Release ==
The film was shown by the Canadian Broadcasting Corporation on 10 April 1980.

== See also ==
- List of submissions to the 52nd Academy Awards for Best Foreign Language Film
- List of Canadian submissions for the Academy Award for Best Foreign Language Film

== Works cited ==
- Evans, Gary (1991). In the National Interest: A Chronicle of the National Film Board of Canada from 1949 to 1989. University of Toronto Press. ISBN 0802027849.
