= The Late Blossom =

1977 film

- French: Le soleil se lève en retard
- Directed by: André Brassard
- Written by: Michel Tremblay; André Brassard
- Produced by: Pierre Lamy
- Starring: Rita Lafontaine
- Cinematography: Alain Dostie
- Edited by: André Corriveau
- Release date: 17 February 1977
- Running time: 112 minutes
- Country: Canada
- Language: French

The Late Blossom (French: Le soleil se lève en retard) is a 1977 Canadian drama film directed by André Brassard and written by his long-time collaborator, playwright Michel Tremblay. It was entered into the 10th Moscow International Film Festival.

== Plot ==
30-year-old Quebec City native Gisèle (Rita Lafontaine) lives a quiet life as a secretary without happiness with her parents and siblings. One day, tired of being teased by her office mates, she decides to consult a marriage agency to find her soul mate.

== Cast ==
- Rita Lafontaine as Gisèle Lapointe
- Denise Filiatrault as Marguerite Lapointe-Beaulieu
- Huguette Oligny as Marie Lapointe
- Claude Gai as Jacques Lapointe
- Jean Mathieu as Joseph Lapointe
- Danièle Panneton as Danielle Lapointe
- François Tassé as Claude Beaulieu
- Edgar Fruitier as Le patron de l'agence
- Sylvie Heppel as La femme du patron de l'agence
- Andrée St-Laurent as La secrétaire de l'agence
- Paule Baillargeon as Ginette
- Josée Labossière as Mariette
- Gilles Renaud as Yvon Thériault
