= Marie-Hélène Falcon =

Marie-Hélène Falcon OQ (born 1942) is a former artistic director for theatre and dance in Quebec.

She was born in Montreal and studied philosophy and theatre at the Université du Québec à Montréal. She was artistic director for the Festival du théâtre étudiant du Québec and co-director for the Association québécoise du jeune théâtre. Falcon was co-founder of the Festival de théâtre des Amériques which later evolved into the Festival TransAmériques and served as its director and artistic director until her departure in June 2014. She also founded Théâtres du monde in 1996 and Nouvelles Scènes in 1997.

Falcon has been frequently invited to participate in international festivals and conferences on contemporary theatre. She has been a member of various award juries and advisory committees in Canada, the United States and Latin America. She received the Gascon-Thomas Award from the National Theatre School of Canada in 1998. She was named a Chevalier in the French Ordre des Arts et des Lettres and became an Officer in the National Order of Quebec in 2003.
