= List of programs broadcast by Prise 2 =

This is a list of television programs currently and formerly broadcast by the Canadian television channel Prise 2.

== Current programming ==
This is a list of programs currently being broadcast as of October 14, 2011:

=== Canadian shows ===
- Les Brillant
- Fort Boyard
- Les grands procès
- Les Lions De Anjou
- The Littlest Hobo (Le Vagabond)
- Samedi de rire
- Soirée Canadienne
- Surprise sur Prise

=== Foreign ===
- Adam-12 (Auto-patrouille)
- Bewitched (Ma sorcière bien-aimée)
- Columbo
- The Flintstones (Les Pierrafeu)
- The Flying Nun (La Soeur Volante)
- Little House on the Prairie (Le petite maison dans la prairie)
- Mission: Impossible (Mission: impossible)
- Three's Company (Vivre à Trois)

== Past ==
=== Canadian shows ===
- Blanche
- Chambres en ville
- Chop Suey
- Le Clan Beaulieu
- Entre chien et loup
- Fais-moi un dessin
- Les Filles de Caleb
- L'or du temps
- Les Moineau et les Pinson
- Peau de banane
- Scoop
- Symphorien

=== Foreign ===
- Adam-12 (Auto-patrouille)
- The A-Team (Agence tous Risques)
- Airwolf (Supercopter)
- Beauty and the Beast (la Belle et la Bête)
- The Benny Hill Show
- Beverly Hills, 90210
- Bonanza
- Charlie's Angels (Drôle de dames)
- Dallas
- Dynasty (Dynastie)
- East of Eden (À l'Est d'Eden)
- Fantasy Island (L'Île Fantaisie)
- The Fugitive (Le Fugitif)
- The Golden Girls (Carré de dames)
- I Dream of Jeannie (Jinny)
- The Incredible Hulk (L'Incroyable Hulk)
- Knight Rider (K 2000)
- Kojak (Chez Kojak)
- Land of the Giants (Au Pays Des Géant)
- Lost in Space (Perdus dans l'Espace)
- The Love Boat (La Croisière s'amuse)
- Lucky Luke
- The Rockford Files (Rockford Enquête)
- Roots (Racines)
- The Saint (Le Saint)
- The Six Million Dollar Man (L'Homme de six millions)
- Star Trek (La Patrouille du Cosmos)
- SWAT ( Section 4)
- The Time Tunnel (Au Coeur du Temps)
- V (V: Les Visiteurs)
- Voyage to the Bottom of the Sea (Voyage au Fond de la Mer)
- Who's the Boss? (Madame est servie)
- Wonder Woman

Animated

- Casper
- Mr. Magoo (Quoi de neuf, Mr. Magoo?)
- Teenage Mutant Ninja Turtles (Les tortues ninja)
- Yogi Bear (Yogi et ses amis)
