= Jacques Fauteux =

Jacques Fauteux (January 29, 1933 – June 30, 2009) was a Canadian radio and television announcer and presenter, best known for his work with Télévision de Radio-Canada. Over the course of his career, he was seen on programs such as Appelez-moi Lise, Point de mire, Le Téléjournal and Tous pour un.

After leaving Radio-Canada in 1986, he hosted the short run talk shows Un bon programme (1988) and Fauteux prise 2 (1992) for TVA.

He also had occasional small acting roles, most notably in the film Bach and Broccoli (Bach et bottine) and the television series René Lévesque and Chartrand et Simonne.

After his death in 2009, he was entombed at the Notre Dame des Neiges Cemetery in Montreal.
