= Luc or His Share of Things =

- French: Luc ou la part des choses
- Directed by: Michel Audy
- Written by: Michel Audy
- Produced by: Alain Lallier; Laurent Simard
- Starring: Pierre Normandin; Éric Boulay; Alain Thiffault
- Cinematography: Michel Audy
- Edited by: Michel Audy
- Music by: Sylvain Pothier; Alain Proulx
- Production companies: Collège de Trois-Rivières; Quebec Ministry of Education
- Distributed by: Multimédia
- Release date: August 27, 1982 (FFM)
- Running time: 91 minutes
- Country: Canada
- Language: French

Luc or His Share of Things (French: Luc ou la part des choses) is a Canadian drama film, directed by Michel Audy and released in 1982. The film stars Pierre Normandin as Luc, a young man in Trois-Rivières, Quebec, who is coming to terms with being gay; the negative reactions from his family and the wider community drive him to attempt suicide, until he is saved by the compassion and support of his friends François (Éric Boulay) and Louis (Alain Thiffault).

The film was originally created as an educational film on LGBT-related issues in counselling for use in social work and psychology programs, and funded by the Quebec Ministry of Education, but was deemed dramatically strong enough to be screened at the 1982 Montreal World Film Festival. However, the film had no other known commercial distribution apart from its educational use.

A chapter analyzing Audy's work in the 2014 book Cinephemera: Archives, Ephemeral Cinema, and New Screen Histories in Canada stated that the film deserved to be rescued from obscurity and exhibited again in light of contemporary discourse around anti-LGBTQ bullying.
