= Beyond Forty =

- La Quarantaine
- Directed by: Anne Claire Poirier
- Written by: Anne Claire Poirier; Marthe Blackburn
- Starring: Monique Mercure; Aubert Pallascio; Luce Guilbeault; Jacques Godin
- Cinematography: Michel Brault
- Edited by: André Corriveau
- Music by: Joël Bienvenue
- Production company: National Film Board of Canada
- Release date: 1982
- Running time: 105 minutes
- Country: Canada
- Language: French

Beyond Forty (French: La Quarantaine) is a Canadian drama film, directed by Anne Claire Poirier and released in 1982. The film centres on a group of childhood friends reuniting as adults in their 40s, and has been compared by critics to the 1983 film The Big Chill.

The film's cast includes Monique Mercure, Louise Rémy, Pierre Thériault, Aubert Pallascio, Luce Guilbeault, Michelle Rossignol, Patricia Nolin and Jacques Godin.

The film received three Genie Award nominations at the 4th Genie Awards in 1983: Best Actress (Mercure), Best Supporting Actress (Nolin) and Best Costume Design (Huguette Gagné).
