= Clair Stevens =

Scottish media producer

Clair Stevens is currently a producer at digital media company Twig World. Previously Clair Stevens was a reporter and producer for STV News in the West and East sub-regions on weekdays. She also worked on the current affairs programme Scotland Tonight and film review show Moviejuice.
