= Cries from the Deep =

- French: Les pièges de la mer
- Directed by: Jacques Gagné
- Screenplay by: Theodore Strauss
- Story by: Jacques-Yves Cousteau
- Produced by: Jacques Bobet
- Starring: Georges Wilson; Jacques-Yves Cousteau
- Narrated by: Georges Wilson
- Cinematography: Guy Dufaux; Colin Mounier
- Music by: François Cousineau
- Release date: July 9, 1982 (Canada)
- Running time: 96 minutes
- Countries: Canada; West Germany; France
- Language: English
- Budget: $600,000 CAD (estimated)

Cries from the Deep (French: Les pièges de la mer) is a 1981 documentary directed by Jacques Gagné about Jacques Cousteau's exploration of the Grand Banks of Newfoundland.

Filmed in the Gulf of St. Lawrence, Québec, Canada, Halifax, Nova Scotia, Canada, St. Lawrence River, Québec and Ontario, Canada, and the St. Lawrence Seaway, Québec and Ontario, Canada. *Trigger warning* Unfortunately, it does show scenes of seals being slaughtered.
