= Les Belles-sœurs =

1965 play by Michel Tremblay

- Original language: Quebec French
- Written by: Michel Tremblay
- Characters: Marie-Ange Brouillette Rose Ouimet Des-Neiges Verrette Yvette Longpré Gabrielle Jodoin Lise Paquette Lisette de Courval Thérèse Dubuc Olivine Dubuc Angéline Sauvé Rhéauna Bibeau Ginette Ménard Pierrette Guérin

Premiere
- Date: August 28, 1968
- Place: Théâtre du Rideau Vert; Montreal

Les Belles-sœurs (French pronunciation: [le bɛl sœʁ]; "The Sisters-in-Law") is a two-act play written by Michel Tremblay in 1965. It was Tremblay's first professionally produced work and remains his most popular and most translated work. The play has had a profound effect on Quebec language, culture and theatre.

Set in Montreal in the 1960s, the plot involves a woman who, having won an enormous quantity of trading stamps in a sweepstakes, throws a "stamping party", with her female relatives and some neighbourhood women invited. As the women paste the stamps into booklets, they bicker, banter, critique, and argue about their problems, circumstances, and everything wrong with the world.

Les Belles-sœurs premiered at Théâtre du Rideau Vert on August 28, 1968. It was directed by André Brassard and starred Denise Proulx, Odette Gagnon, Denise Filiatrault, Rita Lafontaine, Luce Guilbeault, Germaine Giroux and Nicole Leblanc among others, with set design by Réal Ouellette and costumes by François Barbeau. The English version, translated by John Van Burek and Bill Glassco, had its first run at the St. Lawrence Centre in Toronto on April 3, 1973, and starred Candy Kane, Elva Mai Hoover, Monique Mercure, among others. The production was also directed and designed by André Brassard.

The Canadian Theatre Encyclopedia describes the importance of the play in the following way:

The impact of this work is still being argued in Quebec today, but suffice it to say that it changed much of what was believed to be Quebec culture; language, the form of theatre, which plays should be done at which theatres, the displacing of the Old Guard... It set off a storm of controversy, firstly because of the language (a particularly raucous — some say vulgar — joual), and then because it dared to portray working class women doing working class things...

In 1980, Martin Bowman and Bill Findlay translated the play into contemporary Scots as The Guid Sisters. Michael Boyd produced this adaptation for Glasgow's Tron Theatre in 1989 and it went on to play in Toronto in 1990 and the Centaur Theatre in Montreal in 1992. It was revived by the National Theatre of Scotland and the Royal Lyceum Theatre, Edinburgh, in 2012.

In 2018 it played at the Abbey Theatre, Dublin, under the title The Unmanageable Sisters.

A production of Les Belles-Soeurs was performed at the Stratford Festival in Stratford, Ontario during its 2023 season.

Sisters and Neighbors! (Nos Belles-sœurs), a film adaptation directed by René Richard Cyr, premiered in theatres in July 2024.

== Translations ==
English: Glassco, Bill & John Van Burek, trans., Les Belles-Sœurs (English version) (Vancouver: Talonbooks, 1974, 1992) performance at St. Lawrence Centre, Toronto, 3 April 1973.

German: Plocher, Hanspeter, trans., Schwesterherzchen (Tübingen: Niemeyer, 1987) performance at Romanistentheater der Universität Augsburg, 1987.

Scots: Bowman, Martin & Bill Findlay, trans., The Guid Sisters and Other Plays (London: Nick Hern Books, 1991, ISBN 9781854591180. Of the three works in this edition, only one is rendered in the Scots language.

Polish: Kwaterko, Józef, trans., Siostrzyczki (Revue / Dialog 8, 1990) performance Kraków television, Oct. 1993.

Italian: Lemoine, Jean-René & Francesca Moccagatta, trans., Le Cognate, in Il teatro del Québec (Milan: Éditions Ubulibri, 1994) performance at Teatro di Rifredi, Florence, 15 Feb. 1994.

Yiddish: Anctil, Pierre & Goldie Morgentaler, trans., Di Shvegerins (Montreal: Saidye Bronfman Centre, 1992) and performed there June, 1992, as well as in Tel Aviv and Brooklyn.

The play has been translated into about thirty other languages.
