= The Great Ordinary Movie =

1971 film by Roger Frappier

The Great Ordinary Movie, or Joan of Arc is Alive and Well and Living in Quebec
- French: Le Grand film ordinaire, ou Jeanne d'Arc n'est pas morte, se porte bien, et vit au Québec
- Directed by: Roger Frappier
- Produced by: Roger Frappier
- Starring: Paule Baillargeon; Jocelyn Bérubé; Raymond Cloutier; Suzanne Garceau; Claude Laroche; Guy Thauvette
- Cinematography: Jérôme Dal Santo; Pierre Mignot; François Roux
- Edited by: Pierre Lacombe
- Distributed by: Faroun Films
- Release date: February 4, 1971
- Running time: 78 minutes
- Country: Canada
- Language: French

The Great Ordinary Movie, or Joan of Arc is Alive and Well and Living in Quebec (French: Le Grand film ordinaire, ou Jeanne d'Arc n'est pas morte, se porte bien, et vit au Québec) is a Canadian improvisational docudrama film, directed by Roger Frappier and released in 1971. Created in collaboration with the Grand Cirque ordinaire, a Montreal theatre troupe active in the late 1960s and early 1970s, the film blends documentary scenes about contemporaneous life in Quebec with a filmed staging of the troupe's theatrical play T'es pas tannée Jeanne d'Arc, about Joan of Arc living in Quebec.

The film had originally been envisioned as a straight documentary about the troupe, before evolving into its mixed docudrama form.

The film premiered in February 1971 at Montreal's Verdi Cinema. It was later considered to be one of the first and most important progenitors of the independent film movement in Quebec in the 1970s.
