= Monique Mercure =

Canadian actress (1930–2020)

Monique Mercure CC GOQ
- Born: Marie Lise Monique Émond; 14 November 1930; Montreal, Quebec, Canada
- Died: 16 May 2020 (aged 89); Montreal, Quebec, Canada
- Education: Cégep de Saint-Laurent
- Occupation: Actress
- Years active: 1947–2020
- Spouse: Pierre Mercure (m. 1949; div. 1958)
- Children: 3

Marie Lise Monique Émond CC GOQ (14 November 1930 – 16 May 2020), better known as Monique Mercure ([mɔ.nik mɛʁ.kyʁ]), was a Canadian stage and screen actress. She was one of the country's great actors of the classical and modern repertory. In 1977, Mercure won a Cannes Film Festival Award and a Canadian Film Award for her performance in the drama film J.A. Martin Photographer.

== Early life and education ==
Mercure was born Marie Lise Monique Émond in Montreal, Quebec, the daughter of Eugene and Yvonne (née Williams) Emond. Her parents enrolled her as a young child in diction, tap dancing, musical theory and cello classes. She married composer Pierre Mercure in 1949. The couple had three children; their daughter Michèle also worked as an actress, most notably in the films Kid Sentiment and A Scream from Silence (Mourir à tue-tête).

Mercure studied music and dance before studying theatre at St. Lawrence College, Ontario. In 1960 she held her first major role in replacing an actress in The Threepenny Opera.

== Awards ==
At the 1977 Cannes Film Festival Mercure won the award for Best Actress for the film J.A. Martin Photographer. She won the Canadian Film Award for Best Actress at the 28th Canadian Film Awards for the same film that same year.

In 1978, she received a Canadian Film Award nomination for Best Supporting Actress at the 29th Canadian Film Awards for The Third Walker.

Mercure was made an Officer of the Order of Canada in 1977. She was subsequently promoted to Companion seventeen years later in 1994.

At the 4th Genie Awards in 1983, Mercure was a Best Actress nominee for Beyond Forty (La Quarantaine). She won a Genie Award for Best Supporting Actress in 1992 for her role as Fadela in Naked Lunch. In 1999, she won another Best Supporting Actress Genie for her role as Grace Gallagher in Conquest.

Mercure received the Governor General's Performing Arts Award for Lifetime Artistic Achievement, the Prix Denise Pelletier, and the Prix Gascon Roux du Théâtre du Nouveau Monde. The University of Toronto conferred an honorary doctorate on her in 1998. In 2006, she was made a Fellow of the Royal Society of Canada.

== Death ==
Mercure died on 16 May 2020, at a palliative-care centre in Outremont, Montreal. She was 89, and had been suffering from throat cancer. News of her death was first announced by her daughter Michèle, who was at her bedside. Messages of condolence were conveyed by Canadian prime minister Justin Trudeau, Quebec premier François Legault, and Montreal mayor Valérie Plante. Trudeau praised Mercure for how she "helped promote Quebec cinema beyond our borders", adding that "her legacy will live on through her work".

== Filmography ==
=== Film ===
Year	Title	Role	Notes
1963	À tout prendre	Barbara	
1965	Mission of Fear (Astataïon, ou Le festin des morts)	Indian woman	
1966	This Is No Time for Romance (Ça n'est pas le temps des romans)	Madeleine	
1967	Waiting for Caroline	Yvette	
1969	Don't Let the Angels Fall	Mrs. Pelletier	
1970	Two Women in Gold (Deux femmes en or)	Fernande Turcot	
1970	Love in a Four Letter World	Louise	
1971	Finalement...		
1971	Mon oncle Antoine	Alexandrine	
1972	The Time of the Hunt (Le Temps d'une chasse)	Richard's wife	
1972	Françoise Durocher, Waitress		
1974	Once Upon a Time in the East (Il était une fois dans l'est)		
1975	The Vultures (Les Vautours)	Yvette Laflamme	
1975	For Better or For Worse (Pour le meilleur et pour le pire)	Loulou	
1976	Let's Talk About Love (Parlez-nous d'amour)	Madame Jeannot	
1976	The Absence (L'Absence)	Estelle	
1977	J.A. Martin Photographer (J.A. Martin photographe)	Rose-Aimée Martin	
1977	The Third Walker	Marie Blanchard	
1978	The Song of Roland (Le Chanson de Roland)	Marie	
1978	Christmas Lace		
1979	Quintet	Redstone's Mate	
1979	Stone Cold Dead	Dr. Bouvier	
1980	Contrecoeur	Blanche Lavallée	
1980	La cuisine rouge	The mother	
1981	De jour en jour	Odette	
1982	Odyssey of the Pacific	Aunt Elsa	
1982	Beyond Forty (La Quarantaine)	Grosse Louise	
1982	A Day in a Taxi (Une journée en taxi)	Passenger	
1984	The Years of Dreams and Revolt (Les années de rêves)	Yvette Laflamme	
1986	Qui a tiré sur nos histoires d'amour	Madeline	
1989	In the Belly of the Dragon (Dans le ventre du dragon)	Mireille	
1991	Montreal Stories (Montréal vu par...)	Dame Moufette	Segment "La Toile du temps"
1991	Naked Lunch	Fadela	
1992	La fenêtre	Mother	
1994	La fête des rois		
1998	Conquest	Grace Gallagher	
1998	The Red Violin	Madame Leroux	
1999	When Justice Fails	Pauline Wesson	
1999	Set Me Free (Emporte-moi)	Hanna's grandmother	
2004	Geraldine's Fortune	Olive Larose	
2004	Battle of the Brave (Nouvelle-France)	Hortense	
2005	Saint Martyrs of the Damned (Saints-Martyrs-des-Damnés)	Malvina 1	
2007	Twilight (La Brunante)	Madeleine	
2009	The Master Key (Grande Ourse, la clé des possibles)	Centenarian	
2011	Récits d'hyperinflation	Comtesse de Mompiédout	
2011	The Girl in the White Coat	Mrs. Valinsky	
2011	Human Beasts (Bêtes humaines)	Monique Messier	
2015	Marche avec moi	Old lady in the garden	
2017	It's the Heart That Dies Last (C'est le cœur qui meurt en dernier)	Pierrette	

=== Television ===
Year	Title	Role	Notes
1985	Tramp at the Door	Madeleine Fournier	
