= Jacques Gagné =

Canadian film director

Jacques Gagné (October 30, 1936 - November 6, 1994) was a Canadian film director, producer and editor from Montreal, Quebec. He was most noted for his work on the film My Friend Max (Mon amie Max), for which he received a Genie Award nomination for Best Editing at the 15th Genie Awards in 1994.

He began his career as an editor in the 1960s, working on films and television series, before directing the narrative feature film The Conquest (La Conquête). The film was entered into competition at the 24th Canadian Film Awards in 1972, before going into commercial release in 1973.

In 1973 he was one of the Quebec filmmakers who boycotted the 25th Canadian Film Awards, leading to the cancellation of the ceremony.

He did not release any further narrative feature films, but continued to work as an editor, and directed short films, television episodes and the documentary film Cries from the Deep (Les pièges de la mer). He was also a producer of the feature films A Scream from Silence (Mourir à tue-tête) and Cordélia, the latter of which was a Genie Award nominee for Best Picture at the 1st Genie Awards in 1980.
