= Michelle Rossignol =

Canadian actress (1940–2020)

- Born: 4 February 1940; Montreal, Quebec, Canada
- Died: 18 May 2020 (aged 80)
- Occupation: Actress
- Years active: 1956–2010

Michelle Rossignol, OC CQ (4 February 1940 – 18 May 2020) was a Canadian film actress. She appeared in fifteen films between 1956 and 2010. She was made an Officer of the Order of Canada in 1991 and a Knight of the National Order of Quebec in 2001.

== Filmography ==
- Walls of Memory (Mémoire en fête) - 1964, narrator
- Dust from Underground (Poussière sur la ville) - 1968
- Françoise Durocher, Waitress - 1972
- The Conquest (La Conquête) - 1973
- Once Upon a Time in the East (Il était une fois dans l'est) - 1974
- Let's Talk About Love (Parlez-nous d'amour) - 1976
- The Flower Between the Teeth (La fleur aux dents) - 1976
- Cordélia - 1980
- Suzanne - 1980
- Beyond Forty (La Quarantaine) - 1982
- You (Toi) - 2007
- Twice a Woman (Deux fois une femme) - 2010
