= Maurice Blackburn (composer) =

Canadian composer, conductor and luthier (1914–1988)

Joseph Albert Maurice Blackburn (22 May 1914 – 29 March 1988) was a Canadian composer, conductor, sound editor for film, and builder of string instruments. He is known for his soundtracks for animated film.

== Personal life ==
Blackburn was born in Quebec City, Quebec. He was a graduate of the Université Laval and the New England Conservatory in Boston. He won the George Allan Prize in 1940.

He was married to screenwriter Marthe Blackburn, and was the father of science fiction writer Esther Rochon.

== Career ==
From 1942 to 1978, Blackburn worked as a film composer for the National Film Board of Canada, where he was a frequent collaborator of Norman McLaren. Together they developed techniques for etching sound and image directly on film. Blackburn composed the music for McLaren's animation film Blinkity Blank (1954) which won twelve prizes, including the Short Film Palme d'Or at the Cannes Film Festival. In 1969 he created an animated film of his own, Ciné-Crimé.

He composed the opera Une mesure de silence, whose libretto was written by his wife Marthe.

In 1983 he was awarded the Albert-Tessier Prize by the Quebec government.

== Discography ==
=== Compilations ===
- Filmusique-Filmopéra with Yves Daoust (Analekta, AN 7005/06, 1996) (2CD)
