= Anne Claire Poirier =

Canadian film producer (1932–2026)

Anne Claire Poirier OC
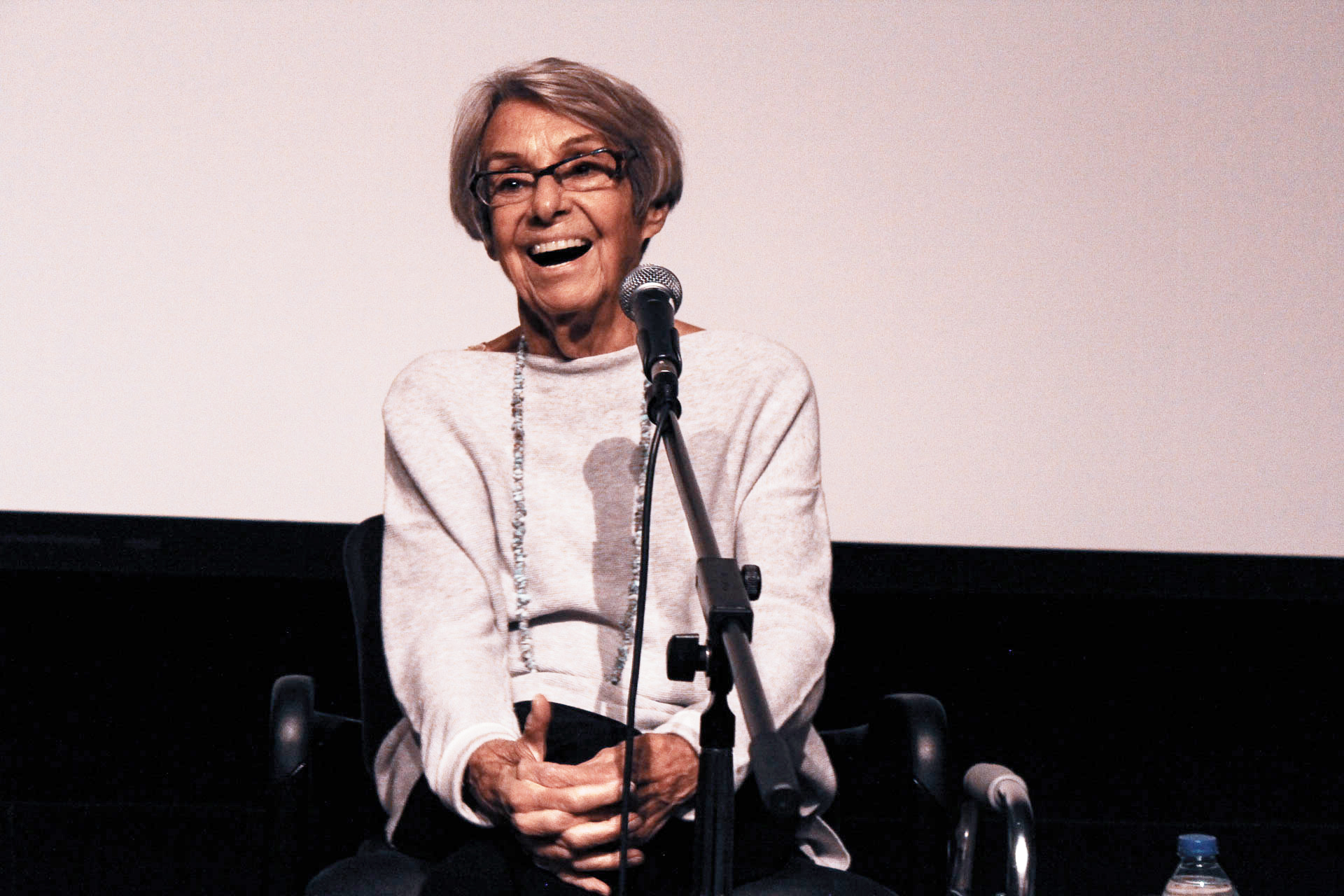
- Poirier in 2019
- Born: 6 June 1932; Saint-Hyacinthe, Quebec, Canada
- Died: 28 September 2026 (aged 94); Outremont, Quebec, Canada
- Occupations: Film producer Film director Screenwriter
- Years active: 1963–1996

Anne Claire Poirier OC (6 June 1932 – 28 September 2026) was a Canadian film producer, director and screenwriter.

== Life and career ==
Poirier was born in Saint-Hyacinthe, Quebec, on 6 June 1932. She was the only female filmmaker on the National Film Board of Canada in the 1960s and 1970s. Her first film, the black and white surrealist fictional documentary De mère en fille (1968), critiques social codes of motherhood and investigates the psychological experience of pregnancy. The film had a significant influence on the nascent feminist movement in Canada. De mère en fille is the first feature film ever directed by a French-Canadian woman. Poirier's film Mourir à tue-tête competed in the Un Certain Regard section at the 1979 Cannes Film Festival. Mourir à tue-tête, which deals with the subject of rape, remains Poirier's best known film. Her 1974 film Les Filles du Roi explores a history of masculinity in Quebec. In 1996, she directed the feature-length documentary Tu as crié Let Me Go to understand the events that led to the murder of her daughter.

Poirier died at her home in Outremont on 28 September 2026, at the age of 94.

== Awards and honours ==
In 1988, she was awarded the Prix Albert-Tessier. Tu as crié Let Me Go received numerous awards including the Genie Award for Best Feature Length Documentary. In 2001, Poirier received a Governor General's Performing Arts Award for Lifetime Artistic Achievement in film. She was appointed an Officer of the Order of Canada in 2003.

== Filmography ==
=== Fiction ===
- La fin des étés – 1964, short
- Le savoir-faire s'impose – 1971, short
- Before the Time Comes (Le temps de l'avant) – 1975
- A Scream from Silence (Mourir à tue-tête) – 1979
- Beyond Forty (La Quarantaine) – 1982
- Salut Victor – 1988

=== Documentaries ===
- Stampede (Short, 1962)
- Nomade de l'Ouest (Short, 1962)
- 30 Minutes, Mr. Plummer (Short, 1963)
- Les ludions (Short, 1965)
- De mère en fille (1968)
- Les filles du Roy (1974)
- Il y a longtemps que je t'aime (1989)
- Tu as crié Let Me Go (1996)

== See also ==
- List of female film and television directors
- List of LGBT-related films directed by women
