= André Brassard =

Canadian stage director, filmmaker and actor (1946–2022)

- Born: 28 August 1946; Montreal, Quebec, Canada
- Died: 11 October 2022 (aged 76); Montreal, Quebec, Canada
- Occupations: Film director screenwriter actor
- Years active: 1972–2022

André Brassard (28 August 1946 – 11 October 2022) was a Canadian stage director, filmmaker and actor, best known for staging the vast majority of Michel Tremblay's plays.

== Career ==
He was the director of the French section of the National Arts Center from 1982 to 1989 and the National Theatre School from 1992 to 2000.

Brassard's 1974 film Once Upon a Time in the East was entered into the 1974 Cannes Film Festival. His 1977 film Le soleil se lève en retard was entered into the 10th Moscow International Film Festival. Brassard received a Governor General's Performing Arts Award for his lifetime contributions to Canadian theatre in 2002.

Brassard was openly gay. He died on 11 October 2022, at the age of 76.

== Filmography ==
- Françoise Durocher, Waitress - short film, 1972
- Once Upon a Time in the East (Il était une fois dans l'est) - 1974
- The Late Blossom (Le soleil se lève en retard) - 1977
- Frédéric - TV series, 1980
- Cap Tourmente - 1993
- 2 Seconds (2 secondes) - 1998
