= Michel Tremblay =

Canadian writer (born 1942)

Michel Tremblay GOQ
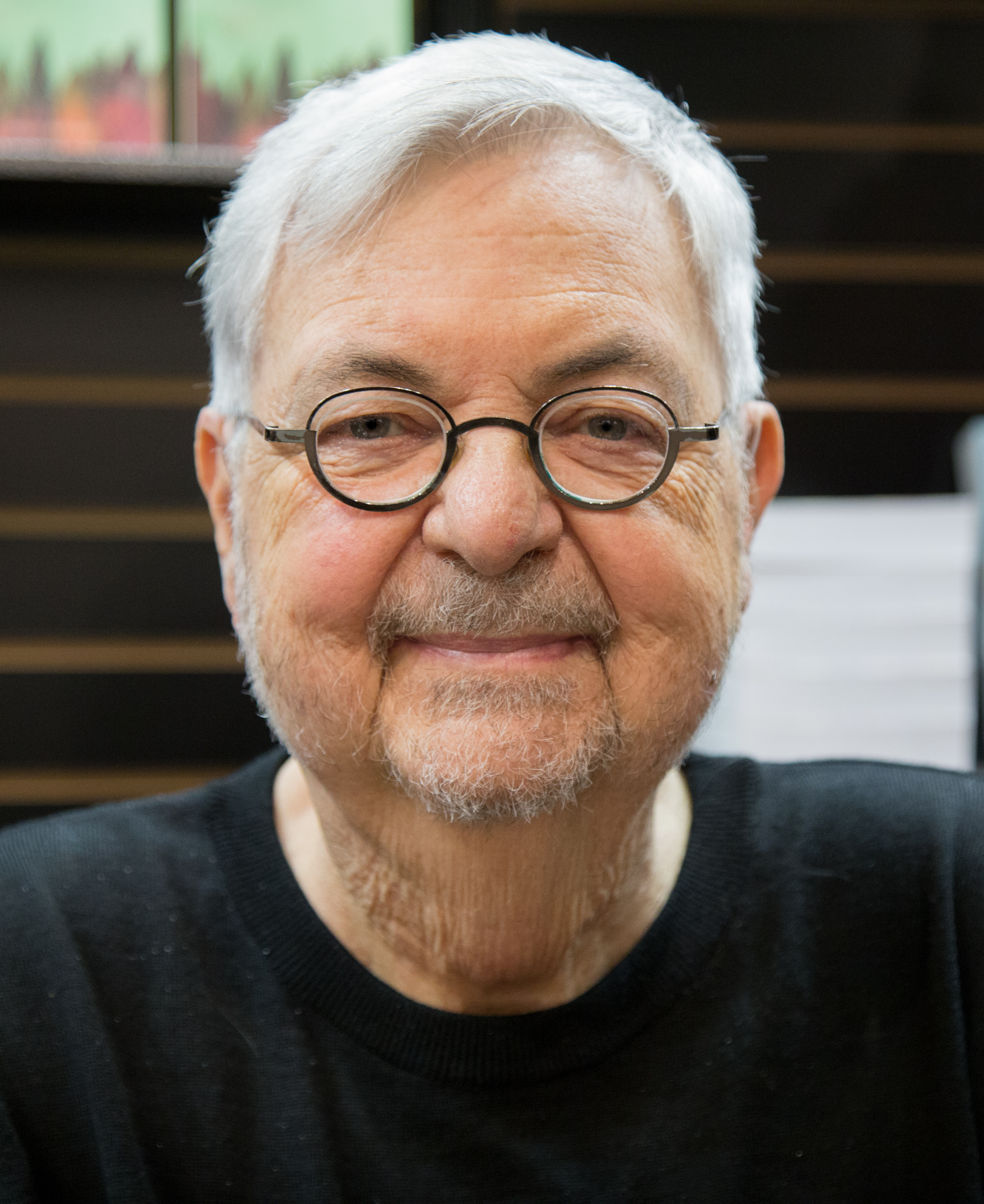
- Tremblay at the Salon du livre de Montréal, 2017
- Born: June 25, 1942 (age 84); Montreal, Quebec, Canada
- Occupations: Writer, novelist, playwright
- Writing career
- Language: French
- Notable works: Les Belles-sœurs (1968); À toi, pour toujours, ta Marie-Lou (1970); La grosse femme d'à côté est enceinte (1978); Albertine, en cinq temps (1984); Le Vrai Monde ? (1987); Encore une fois, si vous permettez (1998)

Michel Tremblay (French pronunciation: [miʃɛl tʁɑ̃blɛ]; born June 25, 1942) is a Canadian writer, novelist and playwright.

Tremblay was born in Montreal, Quebec, where he grew up in the French-speaking neighbourhood of Plateau Mont-Royal; at the time of his birth, a neighbourhood with a working-class character and joual dialect, something that would heavily influence his work. Tremblay's first professionally produced play, Les Belles-Sœurs, was written in 1965 and premiered at the Théâtre du Rideau Vert on August 28, 1968. It transformed the old guard of Canadian theatre and introduced joual to the mainstream. It stirred up controversy by portraying the lives of working-class women and attacking the strait-laced, deeply religious society of mid-20th century Quebec.

== Career and impact ==
Tremblay's early plays, including Hosanna and La Duchesse de Langeais, challenged the boundaries of French Canadian society. Until the Quiet Revolution of the early 1960s, Tremblay saw Quebec as a poor, working-class province dominated by an English-speaking elite and the Roman Catholic Church. Tremblay's work was part of a vanguard of liberal, nationalist thought that helped create an essentially modern society. His most famous plays are usually centred on gay characters. The first Canadian play about and starring a drag queen was his play Hosanna, which was first performed at Théâtre de Quat'Sous in Montreal in 1973.

The women in his plays are usually strong but possessed with demons they must vanquish. It is said he sees Quebec as a matriarchal society. He is considered one of the best playwrights for women. In the late 1980s, Les Belles-sœurs ("The Sisters-in-Law") was produced in Scotland in Scots, as The Guid-Sisters ("guid-sister" being Scots for "sister-in-law"). His work has been translated into many languages, including Yiddish, and including such works as Sainte-Carmen de la Main, Ç'ta ton tour, Laura Cadieux, and Forever Yours, Marilou (À toi pour toujours, ta Marie-Lou).

He has been openly gay throughout his public life, and he has written many novels (The Duchess and the Commoner, La nuit des princes charmants, Le Cœur découvert, Le Cœur éclaté) and plays (Hosanna, La duchesse de Langeais, Fragments de mensonges inutiles) centred on gay characters. In a 1987 interview with Shelagh Rogers for CBC Radio's The Arts Tonight, he remarked that he has always avoided behaviours he has considered masculine; for example, he does not smoke and he noted that he was 45 years old and did not know how to drive a car. "I think I am a rare breed," he said, "A homosexual who doesn't like men." He claims one of his biggest regrets in life was not telling his mother that he was gay before she died.

His latest play to receive wide acclaim is For the Pleasure of Seeing Her Again, a comedic and nostalgic play, centred on the memories of his mother. He later published the Plateau Mont-Royal Chronicles, a cycle of six novels including The Fat Woman Next Door is Pregnant (La grosse femme d'à côté est enceinte, 1978) and The Duchess and the Commoner (La duchesse et le roturier, 1982). The second novel of this series, Therese and Pierrette and the Little Hanging Angel (Thérèse et Pierrette à l'école des Saints-Anges, 1980), was one of the novels chosen for inclusion in the French version of Canada Reads, Le combat des livres, broadcast on Radio-Canada in 2005, where it was championed by union activist Monique Simard.

Tremblay also worked on a television series entitled Le Cœur découvert (The Heart Laid Bare), about the lives of a gay couple in Quebec, for the French-language TV network Radio-Canada. In 2005 he completed another novel cycle, the Cahiers (Le Cahier noir (translated as The Black Notebook), Le Cahier rouge, Le Cahier bleu), dealing with the changes that occurred in 1960s Montreal during the Quiet Revolution. In 2009 The Fat Woman Next Door was a finalist in CBC's prestigious Canada Reads competition.

== Political views ==
For many years, Tremblay has believed that the only reasonable solution for Quebec is to separate from Canada. Once the Parti Québécois was elected in Quebec, he softened his views on allowing his plays to be produced in English there. He made it clear, however, that that did not mean that he agreed with bilingualism, calling it "stupid" and stating that he thought it ridiculous to expect a housewife in Vancouver to be fluent in both English and French.

Despite his often outspoken views in public, Tremblay's treatment of politics in his plays is subtle. Speaking of politics and the theatre in an CBC interview in 1978, Tremblay said:

"I know what I want in the theatre. I want a real political theatre, but I know that political theatre is dull. I write fables."

In April 2006, he declared that he did not support the arguments put forward for the separation of Quebec. But he clarified his thoughts some time later by saying he was still a supporter of Quebec sovereignty, though critical of the actual state of the debate, which in his opinion was too much focused on economic issues. In response to this, the columnist Marc Cassivi of La Presse wrote that "there was only one closet a Quebec artist could never exit and that was the federalist one."

== Awards and honours ==
Tremblay has received numerous awards in recognition of his work. These include the Prix Victor-Morin (1974), the Prix France-Québec (1984), the Chalmers Award (1986) and the Molson Prize (1994).

He received the Lieutenant-Governor's award for Ontario in 1976 and 1977. Tremblay was named the "Montréalais le plus remarquable des deux dernières décennies dans le domaine du théâtre" (the most remarkable Montrealer of the past two decades in theatre) (1978). In 1991 he was appointed Officier de l'Ordre de France, and in the same year, Chevalier de l'Ordre National du Québec. He is also a recipient of the Chevalier de l'Ordre des Arts et des Lettres de France (1994).

In 1999, Tremblay received a Governor General's Performing Arts Award, Canada's highest honour in the performing arts. This produced controversy when several well-known Quebec nationalists suggested that he should refuse the award. While he did not do this, he did admit, for the first time, that he had refused the Order of Canada in 1990.

In 2000, Encore une fois, si vous le permettez (For The Pleasure of Seeing Her Again) won a Chalmers Award and a Dora Mavor Moore Award.

In 2003 he was awarded an honorary degree for his contributions to theatre and playwrighting by Queen Margaret University in a ceremony at the Edinburgh Festival Theatre in Scotland.

In 2024, a plaza-playground in the Plateau-Mont-Royal was named Place de l'Ange-Cornu in honour of Tremblay's book Un ange cornu avec des ailes de tôle.

== Works ==
=== Novels and short story collections ===
Note: Most titles also available in English translations

- Contes pour buveurs attardés (1966) (Tales for Belated Drinkers)
- La Cité dans l'œuf (1969) (The City in the Egg)
- C't'à ton tour, Laura Cadieux (1973) (It's Your Turn, Laura Cadieux)
- Le Cœur découvert (1986) (The Heart Laid Bare)
- Les Vues animées (1990) (The Animated Views)
- Douze coups de théâtre: récits (1992) (Twelve Strokes of Drama: Stories)
- Le Cœur éclaté (1993) (The Heart Broken)
- Un ange cornu avec des ailes de tôle (1994)
- La nuit des princes charmants (1995) (Some Night My Prince Will Come)
- Le Fantôme de Don Carlos (1996) (The Phantom of Don Carlos)
- Quarante-quatre minutes, quarante-quatre secondes (1997) (Forty-Four Minutes, Forty-Four Seconds)
- Hôtel Bristol New York, N.Y (1999) (Bristol Hotel New York, NY)
- L'Homme qui entendait siffler une bouilloire (2001) (The Man who heard a Whistling Kettle)
- Bonbons assortis (2002) (Assorted Candies)
- Le Trou dans le mur (2006) (The Hole in the Wall)
- La Traversée du continent (2007) (Crossing the Continent)
- La Traversée de la ville (2008) (Crossing the City)
- La Traversée des sentiments (2009) (Crossing Feelings)
- Le passage obligé (2010)
- La grande mêlée (2011)
- Au hazard la chance (2012)
- Les clefs du Paradise (2013)
- Chroniques du Plateau Mont-Royal, series of six novels:

La grosse femme d'à côté est enceinte (1978) (The Fat Woman Next Door is Pregnant)
Thérèse et Pierrette à l'école des Saints-Anges (1980) (Therese and Pierrette and the Little Hanging Angel)
La Duchesse et le roturier (1982) (The Duchess and the Commoner)
Des nouvelles d'Édouard (1984) (News from Édouard)
Le Premier Quartier de la lune (1989) (The First Quarter of the Moon)
Un objet de beauté (1997) (A Thing of Beauty)

- The Notebook Trilogy:

Le Cahier noir (2003) (The Black Notebook)
Le Cahier rouge (2004) (The Red Notebook)
Le Cahier bleu (Tremblay)|Le Cahier bleu (2005) (The Blue Notebook)

- La Shéhérazade des pauvres (2022)

=== Plays ===
Note: Most titles also available in English translations

- Le Train, 1964. ("The Train")
- Les Belles-Sœurs, 1968. (available in English as "The Sisters In-Law" and in Scots as The Guid-Sisters)
- En pièces détachées, 1970. (available in English as "In Parts")
- Trois petits tourts, 1971. ("Three Pies")
- À toi, pour toujours, ta Marie-Lou (1971) (Forever Yours, Marilou)
- Demain matin, Montréal m'attend, 1972. ("Tomorrow Morning, Montreal Waits for Me")
- Hosanna et La Duchesse de Langeais, 1973. (available in English as Hosanna and La Duchesse de Langeais)
- Bonjour, là, bonjour, 1974. (available in English as Hello There, Hello)
- Les Héros de mon enfance, 1976. ("The Heroes of my Childhood")
- Sainte Carmen de la Main et Surprise ! Surprise !, 1976 (Under the name Sainte-Carmen of the Main, this play received its first U.S. run at New York City's Cubiculo Theatre in 1986)
- Damnée Manon, sacrée Sandra, 1977. ("Manon Damned, Sacred Sandra," available in English as Damnée Manon, sacrée Sandra)
- L'Impromptu d'Outremont, 1980. (The Impromptu of Outremont)
- Les Anciennes Odeurs, 1981. ("The Ancient Odours")
- Albertine en cinq temps, 1984 (Albertine in Five Times)
- Le Gars de Québec: d'après le Revizor de Gogol, 1985. ("The Boys of Quebec from the Government Inspector by Gogol")
- Le Vrai Monde?, 1987. (The Real World?)
- Nelligan, 1990. ("Nelligan")
- La Maison suspendue, 1990. (The House Adjourned, available in English as La Maison suspendue)
- Marcel poursuivi par les chiens, 1992. (Marcel Pursued by the Hounds)
- En circuit fermé, 1994. ("Closed Circuit")
- Messe solennelle pour une pleine lune d'été, 1996. ("Solemn Mass for a Full Moon Summer")
- Encore une fois si vous permettez, 1998 (For The Pleasure of Seeing Her Again)
- L'État des lieux, 2002. ("The Current Situation")
- Impératif présent, 2003. ("Present")
- Bonbons assortis au théâtre, 2006 (Assorted Candy for the Theatre)
- Le Paradis à la fin de vos jours, 2008 ("Paradise at the end of your days")
- Fragments de mensonges inutiles, 2009 ("Pieces of useless lies")
- L'Oratorio de Noël, 2012

=== Film scripts ===
- Françoise Durocher, Waitress - 1972
- Once Upon a Time in the East (Il était une fois dans l'est) - 1974
- Let's Talk About Love (Parlez-nous d'amour) - 1976
- The Late Blossom (Le Soleil se lève en retard) - 1977
- The Heart Exposed (Le Cœur découvert) - 1987
- It's Your Turn, Laura Cadieux (C't'à ton tour, Laura Cadieux) - 1998

== Works about Tremblay ==
- Tremblay, Michel. (2003). Birth of a Bookworm. Translated by Sheila Fischman. Talonbooks: Vancouver, BC. ISBN 978-0-88922-476-6.
- Tremblay, Michel. (1998). Bambi and Me. Translated by Sheila Fischman. Talonbooks: Vancouver, BC. ISBN 978-0-88922-380-6.
- Renate Usmiani, Michel Tremblay. Douglas and McIntyre, 1982, ISBN 0-295-95863-4
- Gilbert David and Pierre Lavoie, editors, "Le Monde de Michel Tremblay". Cahiers de Théâtre JEU/Éditions Lansman, 1993.
- Craig Walker, "Michel Tremblay: Existential Mythopoeia," The Buried Astrolabe: Canadian Dramatic Imagination and Western Tradition. McGill-Queen's UP, 2001, ISBN 0-7735-2074-0 (hardcover), ISBN 0-7735-2075-9 (paperback)
