= Gilles Brown =

Canadian singer-songwriter (1943–2016)

- Born: February 6, 1943; Montreal, Quebec, Canada
- Died: February 6, 2016 (aged 73); Montreal, Quebec, Canada
- Occupations: Singer-songwriter, Producer

Gilles Brown (6 February 1943 – 6 February 2016) was a Canadian singer-songwriter and producer from Quebec.

== Biography ==
Gilles Brown was born in Montreal, Quebec, Canada on 6 February 1943.

He was trained in journalism and communications.

He formed the Valentins with Pierre Laurendeau in 1962. The Valentins became somewhat popular thanks to the song "Parce que". He also had his debut as a radio announcer in 1962.

He went solo in 1964 and had his first hit with "Monsieur la basse", a French adaptation of "Mr. Bass Man" by Johnny Cymbal. He also became successful through "Ce soir", "C’est toi que j’aime", "Mon ange", "Le chef de la bande" and "Agent secret". He participated in the tour Musicorama in 1966.

Gilles Brown was one of Quebec's first yé-yé performers. He had a stable level of popularity during multiple years, but never became a great star.

He was a prolific songwriter, writing for Les Sultans and Stéphane, and making francophone adaptations of hundreds of anglophone songs for the producers Denis Pantis, Tony Roman, Guy Cloutier and Yves Martin.

He wrote the biggest hits of multiple performers in 1963–1973, including César et les Romains ("Toi et moi"), Fernand Gignac ("Ne pleure pas"), the Gendarmes ("Ne me quitte pas"), Michèle Richard ("Les boîtes à gogo") and Anne Renée ("Un amour d'adolescent"). During this same period, he also wrote for Robert Demontigny, Jenny Rock, Claire Lepage, Michel Louvain, Les Lutins, Les Milady's, Les Baronets, Les Hou-Lops, Steve Fiset, Margot Lefebvre, Tony Massarelli, Ginette Reno, Claude Stében, Johnny Farago, Patrick Zabé, Liette Lomez, Céline Lomez, François Bégin, France Castel, Jean Nichol, Dany Aubé, Nada, Donald Lautrec, Jacques Boulanger, Jacques Salvail, Jean Malo, Nicole Martin, Anne Renée, Simon and Raynald Papillon.

Between 1971 and 1973, he recorded songs in a duo with Yves Martin, some of which like "Il ne faut pas pleurer" were very successful. In the early 1980s, he returned to songwriting and wrote the texts and music of three of Claude Valade's albums. He produced the latter under the label Création. He was part of the board of directors of the SPACQ.

Brown died of cancer on 6 February 2016 in Montreal. He had spent the last years of his life managing the art galleries Clarence-Gagnon in Montreal and in Baie-Saint-Paul, which he owned since the 1980s.

== Discography ==
Singles
Year	Title
1962	Apprendre à twister/Lucie
1962	Lise/Je peux t’aimer
1963	Parce que/Reviens Diane
1963	Hélène/Un gars sans une fille
1963?	Quand on est amoureux/Footsee
1964	Monsieur la basse/On se trouvera
1964	Ensemble/On n’est plus en vacances
1964	Ce soir/Quand celle qu’on aime sourit
1964	C’est la bamba/C’est toi que j’aime
1965	Mon ange/Ce danger, c’est moi
1965	Le chef de la bande/Toujours des beaux jours
1965	Silhouettes/Vive la liberté
1966	Les cloches sonnent/Adieu, bonne chance
1966	Agent secret/On est jeune qu’une fois
1967	Son nom est Lison/Elle a pleuré
1967	Cette fille/Il est devenu quelqu’un
1967	C’est pour vous que je chante/Moi j’aime les filles
1967	Parce que/Tu n’es plus une petite fille
1968	Le karaté/Ne t’en va pas
1969	Le grand imposteur/J’ai rêvé d’un ange
1969	C’est l’été qui revient/La rose et l’amour
1969	Ce soir/Cette fille/C’est pour vous que je chante/Agent secret
1971	Un souvenir/On est ben tannés
1971	Il ne faut pas pleurer/Non monsieur
1972	Il faut se dire adieu/Je t’invite à l’amour
1972	Alors pourquoi ne pas dire que tu m’aimes/La route est longue
1972	Ce soir/Pour tous les âges
1973	Pardonne-moi/Tant que l’on s’aimera
1973	Viens, viens/Prends mon coeur
1973	Ciao, ciao Maria/Je ne pourrai plus oublier
1974	Parce que/Diane
1978	Ce soir/C’est pour vous que je chante
1978	C’est toi que j’aime/Mon ange
1984	Les enfants/Si

Albums
Year	Title
1963	Les Valentins
1964	Voici Gilles Brown
1965	C’est toi que j’aime
1967	Agent secret
1968	15 disques d’or
1969	Gilles Brown: 15 succès
1969	Ce soir
1972	Yves Martin et Gilles Brown
1973	Il faut se dire adieu
1974	Yves Martin et Gilles Brown: disque d’or
1974	21 disques d’or
2000	C'est pour vous que je chante
