= Jacques Desrosiers =

Canadian actor and singer (1938–1996)

- Jacques Desrosiers on his 1964 album Comédie Twistée
- Born: July 8, 1938; Montreal, Quebec, Canada
- Died: June 11, 1996 (aged 57); Montreal, Quebec, Canada
- Occupations: Actor, singer
- Years active: 1956–1995
- Known for: Patof

Jacques Desrosiers (July 8, 1938 – June 11, 1996) was a Québécois Canadian singer and actor, best known for his role as the clown Patof in the Canadian television series Patofville. He was born in Montreal, Quebec.

== Early life ==
Jacques Desrosiers was the seventh child from a family of 15. He was the son of Pierre Desrosiers, a burlesque actor and pianist Lucienne Fleury. Jacques had two brothers who were singers, André Fontaine and Édouard Desrosiers.

Following his parent's footsteps, Jacuqeus took drama lessons with Sita Riddez but never completed them. As he performed with an amateur theatre troupe, he was approached by Nicolas Doclin, a worker from CBC/Radio-Canada which helped Jacques set foot in television. During this time, he also joined Paul Buissonneau's Théâtre de la Roulotte as supporting roles.

== Television ==
Jacques was involved in many projects including the musical Zéro de conduite (1963–64), where he met Dominique Michel, Denise Filiatrault, and Donald Lautrec. He was also in another musical alongside Clémence Desrochers, Le vol du flamant rose in 1964.

In 1972, he was asked to play the role of a clown for The Captain's Circus. While initially refusing, he finally made a single appearance that helped increased Patof's popularity and made him a main star in Télé-Métropole shows.

== Cinema & theatre ==
Jacques Desrosiers appeared in several Canadian films, such as C'est pas la faute à Jacques Cartier (1967), Après ski (1970), Le Party (1990) directed by Pierre Falardeau and La Florida (1993) directed by George Mihalka.

Additionally, he performed in comedy theatre productions under the management of Gilles Latulippe.

== Personal life ==
Jacques was a homosexual but never disclosed the fact during his life due to his role in children entertainment and societal taboo at the time.

Jacques Desrosiers died on June 11, 1996, at the age of 57, due to bone and lung cancer following a brief illness.

== Filmography ==
=== Cinema and TV series ===
- 1957 Domino (TV series)
- 1958 Cirque Boto (TV series)
- 1963 Ça va éclater (end-of-year special with Dominique Michel, Denise Filiatrault and Donald Lautrec)
- 1966 YUL 871
- 1967 Moi et l'autre (TV series)
- 1967 It Isn't Jacques Cartier's Fault (C'est pas la faute à Jacques Cartier)
- 1968 Le Paradis terrestre (TV series)
- 1968 Les trois cloches (TV series)
- 1969-1970 Entre nous (TV series)
- 1969-1970 Vaudeville (TV series)
- 1970 Bon appétit (TV series)
- 1971 Sex in the Snow (Après-ski)
- 1971 Finalement...
- 1972 Café Terrasse (TV series)
- 1972-1973 Le cirque du Capitaine (TV series)
- 1972 Les Indrogables
- 1972 The Rebels (Quelques arpents de neige)
- 1972-1973 Madame est servie (TV series)
- 1973-1976 Patofville (TV series)
- 1974 There's Nothing Wrong with Being Good to Yourself (C'est jeune et ça sait tout)
- 1975-1976 Patof raconte (TV series)
- 1976-1977 Patof voyage (TV series)
- 1976 Chère Isabelle (TV series)
- 1977-1978 Monsieur Tranquille (TV series)
- 1979 Chez Denise (TV series)
- 1990 Avec un grand A (TV series), episode called "Michel et François"
- 1990 The Party (Le Party)
- 1993 La Florida
- 1995 Scoop IV (TV series)

=== DVD ===
- 2007 Le Party (Maple pictures)
- 2007 C'est pas la faute à Jacques-Cartier (Carte Blanche collection, ONF)
- 2008 Après-Ski (Equinoxe Films)
- 2008 La Florida (Alliance)
- 2011 Bonjour Patof (Musicor Produits Spéciaux)

== Discography ==
=== Albums ===
Year	Album	Label	Qc Chart	Notes
1959	Et voici : Jacques Desrosiers	Fleur de lys	—	
1960	Jacques Desrosiers au « Casa Loma »	Apex	—	Live, reissued in 1966 under the name Monsieur citron (Lero)
1964	Comédie twistée	Trans-Canada	Top 50	Reissued in 1966 (Franco-Élite)
1968	Jacques Desrosiers chante la poule	Trans-Canada	—	Reissued in 1968 under the name Sur la terrasse (Nouveau Montagnard)
1968	Jacques Desrosiers	Soleil	—	
1972	Patof en Russie	Campus	N°5	Patof Album
1972	Patof chez les esquimaux	Campus	—	Patof Album
1972	Patof chez les coupeurs de têtes	Campus	—	Patof Album
1972	Patof dans la baleine	Campus	Top 50	Patof Album
1972	Patof chez les petits hommes verts	Campus	Top 50	Patof Album
1972	Patof chez les cowboys	Campus	Top 50	Patof Album
1973	Patof chante 10 chansons pour tous les enfants du monde	Campus	Top 50	Patof Album
1973	Patofville – Patof chante pour toi	Campus	Top 50	Patof Album
1974	Bienvenue dans ma bottine	Campus	Top 50	Patof Album
1975	Patof Rock	Campus	—	Patof Album
1975	Noël Noël Noël avec Patof	Campus	—	Patof Album
1976	Gare... à Patof	Campus	—	Patof Album
1976	Super Patof	Campus	—	Patof Album
1977	Eugène – Les chansons d'Eugène	T.M./P.A.X.	—	Eugène Album

=== Singles ===
Year	Single	Label	Qc Chart	Notes
1958	Dans nos campagnes – La veuve	Apex	— —	
1958	Je n'suis pas beau – Ça m'gêne	Sandryon	— —	
1958	Le peddler – La java à Lumina	Fleur de lys	— N°22	
1959	Hortense, t'es pas sexée – Ou trop vite ou pas assez	Fleur de lys	— —	
1959	Et voici Jacques Desrosiers – Je promet	Fleur de lys	— —	
1959	Alfonso – Y paraît que	Fleur de lys	— —	
1960	La lune et les terriens – La java des mal mariés	Variétés	— —	With Les Bouts d'choux (acc. by Fernando Saint-Georges Ensemble)
1961	Tu t'laisses aller – Fais-moi hi	Apex	— —	
1963	La machine à laver – Bossa nova Madeleine	Franco	N°30 —	
1965	Je prends l'œuf – L'état du Québec	Succès du jour	— N°16	
1965	Splish Splash – C'est toi mon cibole	Télédisc	Top 50 —	
1965	Y'a des bébittes – Je suis soldat	Télédisc	N°30 —	
1966	Un homme malade – Les cigarettes	Télédisc	— —	
1966	L'état du Québec '66 – Les élucubrations de Jacques	Télédisc	— —	
1967	Le téléfon – Message du président	Casino	N°35 —	
1967	Mao et Moa – Monsieur Z	Casino	— —	
1967	Guantanamera – L'homme mécanique	Élysée	— —	
1967	Mon cerf-volant – Instrumental	Élysée	— —	From the movie "C'est pas la faute à Jacques Cartier"
1968	Comme d'habitude – La poule	Canusa	— —	
1969	La samba de la lune – Dis que tu m'aimes	Canusa	— —	
1970	Pollution de l'air – Le beau temps	R&B	— —	
1971	Une job pour Noël – C'est pu pareil	Spectrum	— —	With Gilbert Chénier
1972	Patof Blou (children version) – Patof Blou (political version)	Campus	N°1 —	Patof Single
1972	Patof le roi des clowns – Ballade pour un clown (Dis Patof?)	Campus	N°2 —	Patof Single
1973	The King of Clowns – Dear Patof	Polydor	— —	Patof Single
1973	Oh! Les enfants – On m'applaudit	Campus	N°14 —	Patof Single
1973	Patofville – L'éléphant Tic-Tac	Campus	N°15 —	Patof Single
1973	L'éléphant Tic-Tac (mono version) – L'éléphant Tic-Tac (mono version)	Campus	— —	Patof Single, "D.J. Special" version
1973	Bonjour les enfants – La plus belle poupée du monde	Campus	N°15 —	Patof Single
1974	Bienvenue dans ma bottine – Goodbye, au revoir, dasvidanie!	Campus	N°31 —	Patof Single
1975	Gros minou – Bonjour Patof	Campus	— —	Patof Single
1975	Y'a rien là – Y'a rien là (instrumental)	Campus	— —	
1976	Patof Blou – Patofville – Bonjour Patof – Gros minou	Campus	— — — —	Patof Single, Previously released material, Promo
1976	Faut pas me chercher (Patof and Monsieur Tranquille) – Mon ami Pierrot	Jades	— —	Patof Single, with Roger Giguère
1980	T'es pas sérieux – On fait le tour de la terre	Girafe	— —	Nestor & Patof Single, with Claude Blanchard

=== Compilations ===
Year	Album	Label	Qc Chart	Notes
1974	Patof le roi des clowns	Pantin	Top 50	Patof Album
1975	22 grands succès de Patof	Trans-World	—	Patof Album

=== Collaborations and performances as guest star ===
Year	Album	Collaborator	Notes
1963	Les trois cloches	Lucien Stéphano and P.A. Thibault	Soleil
1964	Le vol rose du Flamant	Various artists	Le vol rose du flamant (with the group) – Récitatif des arrivants (with the group) – Le gigueur de ville (with the group) – Au prix du gros – Last call (with Jean-Pierre Masson). (Others songs by various artists) (RCA Victor)
1967	Initiation au karaté	Roger Lesourd	Soleil
1975	C'est le départ/They're off!	Donald Pinard and Gilles Gendron	Horse racing game, 4 LP Box Set, special collaboration of Jacques Desrosiers (Arthur Sugarman)
1976	Patofville – Patof et ses amis	Various artists	TeeVee, Compilation
1977	20 grands succès de Patof, Fafouin, Itof	Roger Giguère	Télé-Métropole Inc., Compilation
1980	Nestor et Patof – Pour tous	Claude Blanchard	Girafe
2006	Nestor – Les grands succès	Claude Blanchard	Featuring the B-side of the album Nestor et Patof – Pour tous (Disques Mérite, Compilation)

=== Complete discography ===
- Jacques Desrosiers French Discography
- Patof French Discography
- Monsieur Tranquille French Discography

== Theatre ==
- 195? Altitude 3200, by Julien Luchaire.
- 1958 Les oiseaux de lune, by Marcel Aymé (Comédie Canadienne)
- 1963-1964 Zéro de conduite (musical review with Dominique Michel, Denise Filiatrault and Donald Lautrec)
- 1964 Le vol rose du Flamant, a musical by Clémence DesRochers and Pierre F. Brault
- 1989 La muselière, by Yvon Brochu (Théâtre Sainte-Adèle)
- 1995 Femme demandée (Théâtre des Variétés)

== Bibliography ==
- Jacques Desrosiers, Millionnaire (autobiography), Boucherville, Les Éditions de Mortagne, 1981.

== Awards and recognition ==
- 1972 Golden record (100,000 sales) for the single Patof Blou
- 1973 Golden record (100,000 sales) for the single Patof le roi des clowns
- 1997 A street in Quebec (Blainville) was named in his honor
