= Michel Pagliaro =

Canadian rock singer

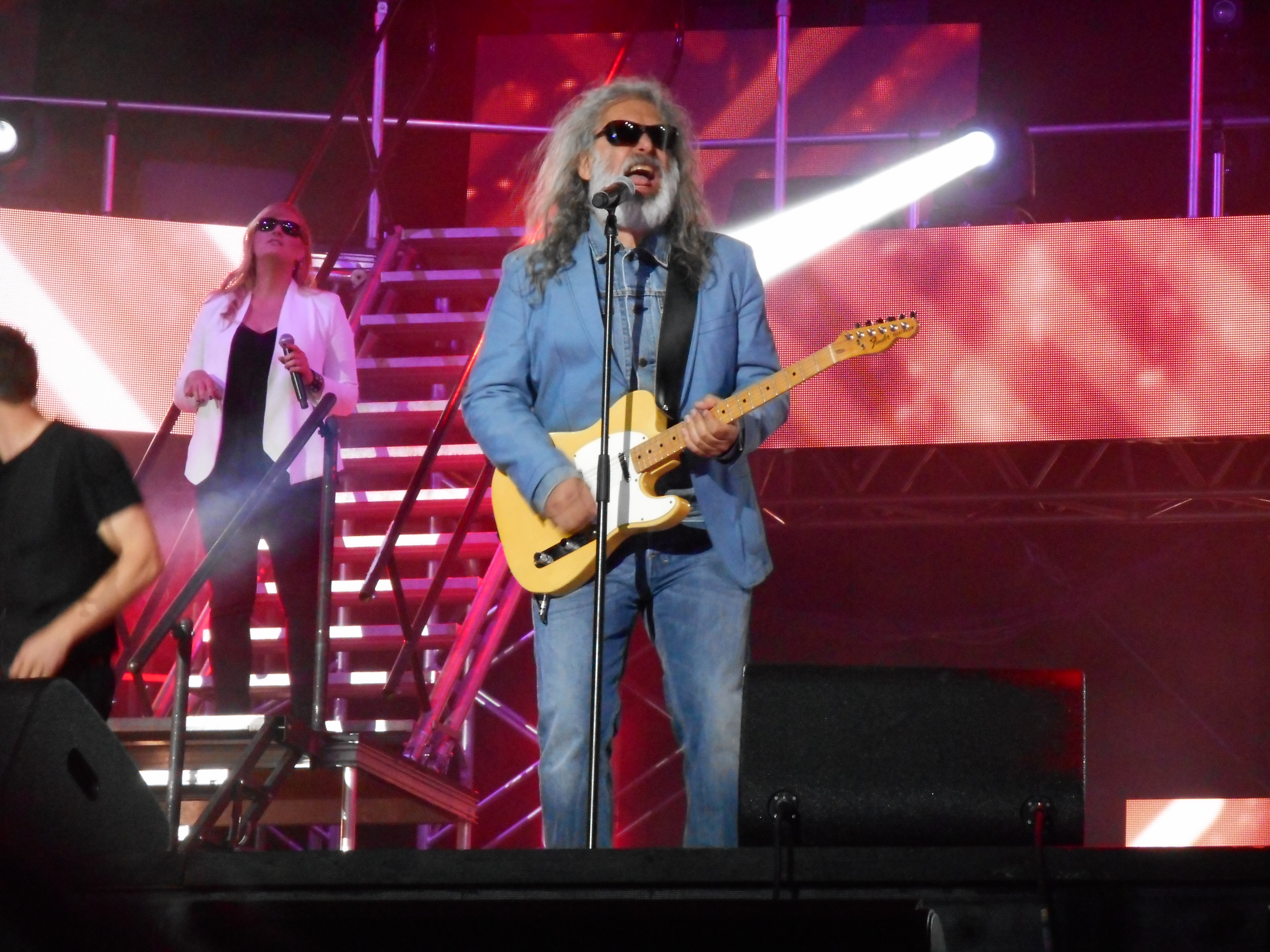
- Pagliaro in 2016

Background information
- Born: 9 November 1948 (age 78); Montreal, Quebec, Canada
- Occupations: Singer, songwriter and guitarist
- Years active: 1966–present
- Labels: DCP International; Spectrum; Much; RCA; Columbia (also Pye in the UK and US, and Columbia in US; French-language recordings bear the CBS brand)
- Website: pagliaro.ca

Michel Armand Guy Pagliaro (born 9 November 1948) is a Canadian rock singer, songwriter and guitarist from Montreal, Quebec. Although he writes and records predominantly in French, Pagliaro has reached international success mainly with material released in English. He was nominated for a 1975 Juno Award as male vocalist of the year.

== Career ==
Pagliaro was born and raised in Montreal. He began performing in 1962, at the age of 13. In 1965, he began making his first records. Pagliaro's first nationally English-charted hit was his 1970 single "Give Us One More Chance". Other significant hits in English include "Lovin' You Ain't Easy" (1971) which reached Number 31 on the UK Singles Chart in February 1972, "Rainshowers" (1972), "Some Sing Some Dance" (1972), and "What The Hell I Got" (1975). Pagliaro was the first Canadian artist to score top 40 hits on both the anglophone and francophone pop charts in Canada.

Michel Pagliaro also produced the first album of his son Roman's group Les Fous de la Reine, which won both Musiqualité and Diapason music contests in 2014. That album's first two singles, La Guillotine and La face cachée de la neige, got a positive reception and were played regularly on commercial radio stations, including CKOI-FM. He continues to perform in concert.

== Awards ==
At the Juno Awards of 1975, Pagliaro was nominated for the Male Vocalist of the Year award. Pagliaro received the Governor General's Performing Arts Award for Lifetime Artistic Achievement, Canada's highest honour in the performing arts, in 2008. His song "J'entends frapper", a major hit in Quebec, was inducted into the Canadian Songwriters Hall of Fame in 2010.

In 2002, Pagliaro was the recipient of the National Achievement Award at the annual Francophone SOCAN Awards held in Montreal.

In 2023, Pagliaro was inducted into Canada's Walk of Fame.

In 2025, Pagliaro was inducted into the Canadian Songwriters Hall of Fame.

== Discography ==
=== Studio albums ===
Pagliaro sometimes made different albums with the same title. All releases listed here are originals, not reissues.

Year	Album	RPM ranking	Label	Notes
1968	Michel Pagliaro	—	DSP International	
1970	Pagliaro	—	Spectrum	
1970	Première époque	—	Spectrum	Album featuring for the first time some singles recorded between 1966 and 1970.
1971	Pagliaro a.k.a. Rainshowers	49	Much	Reissued in 1976 on Amber Label
1972	PAG	86	RCA Victor	
1974	Rockers	—	RCA Victor	
1974	Pagliaro a.k.a. Ça va brasser	—	RCA Victor	
1975	Pagliaro I	—	Columbia	
1975	Pagliaro	—	CBS	
1976	Aujourd'hui	—	CBS	
1977	Time Race	—	Columbia	
1978	Rock'n roll	—	Martin	
1980	The Rockers	—	RCA	European release
1981	Bamboo	—	Trans-Canada	
1988	Sous peine d'amour	—	Alert Music	Reissued in 1990, The track "It's love" has been replaced by "Les bombes" and "Rock somebody" by "Dangereux"; Audiogram.

=== Live albums ===
Year	Album	RPM ranking	Label	Notes
1973	Pagliaro Live	53	RCA Victor	
2005	Live à Québec	—	Earth Born Entertainment	

=== Singles ===
Year	Single	RPM ranking	Label	Notes
1966	On est heureux – J'ai cru à mon rêve	—	RCA Victor	With Les Tallmud
1966	Personne ne sait – Pour vous	—	Miracle	With Les Chanceliers
1966	Tu peux t'en aller – Non ce n'est pas fini	—	Trans-Canada	With Les Chanceliers
1967	Le p'tit Poppy – La génération d'aujourd'hui	—	Citation	With Les Chanceliers
1967	Toi jeune fille – Seul trop longtemps	—	Citation	With Les Chanceliers
1967	Oogum boogum – La fille dont je rêve	—	Citation	With Les Chanceliers
1967	Noel blanc – L'enfant au tambour	—	Citation	Side A by Les Chanceliers, Side B by César Et Les Romains
1967	À Paris la nuit – Attends tu verras	—	Citation	With Les Chanceliers
1968	Boule de suie – Herménégylde Godefroy	—	Citation	With Les Chanceliers
1968	Les vacances (with Renée Martel) – Tous les arbres sont en fleurs (by Renée Martel)	—	Citation	
1968	Comme d'habitude – Sunny	—	DSP	
1968	Spooky – Jojo le clown	—	DSP	
1968	Ton nom imprimé sur mon cœur – Dum dum dum	—	DSP	
1968	Hey Jude – Ils dépensent tout	—	DSP	With François d'Assise
1968	Saint Nicolas – Le petit enfant saint	—	DSP	
1968	Que le monde est beau	—	DSP	Promo disc recorded on one face
1969	Comme d'habitude – Sunny – À Paris la nuit (with Les Chanceliers) – Un enfant (with Les Chanceliers)	—	DSP Super 4	Compilation
1969	Spooky (with François d'Assise) – Jojo le clown (with François d’Assise) – Les vacances (with Renée Martel) – Tous les arbres sont en fleur (with Renée Martel)	—	DSP Super 4	Compilation
1969	Avec la tête, avec le cœur – Que le monde est beau	—	Spectrum	
1969	À t'aimer – Marguerite	—	Spectrum	
1969	C'est l'été – Vous	—	Spectrum	With Renée Martel
1969	Pour toi, pour toi – Mama river	—	Spectrum	
1970	Na na hey hey goodbye – Delta lady	—	Spectrum	With Nanette Workman
1970	L'amour est là – Toute la nuit	—	Spectrum	
1970	J'ai marché pour une nation – Oui c'est bien facile	—	Spectrum	
1970	Walking across the nation – Miami roads	—	Hippopotamus	
1970	Give us one more chance – Good feelings all over	58	Much	
1970	We're dancing 'til it blows over – I wanna turn you on	—	Much	
1971	M’lady – Dans le même ton	—	AMI Records	
1971	Lovin' you ain't easy – She moves light	15	Much	
1972	Mon cœur – Pagliaro	—	AMI Records	
1972	Rainshowers – It ain't the way	35	Much	
1972	Revolution – Illusion	—	Much	
1972	Some sing, some dance – Magic moments	47	Much	
1972	Safari – Ayala red	—	Much	With the group Mighty
1972	J'entends frapper – Chez moi	63	RCA Victor	
1973	Fou de toi – Prisonnier d'enfer	—	RCA Victor	
1973	Run along, baby – You gotta make it	61	Much	
1973	Sure, maybe – Northern star	—	Much	
1973	Miss Ann – Notre côté B	—	Much	With les Rockers
1974	Faut tout donner – Histoire d'amour	—	RCA Victor	
1974	Killing time – It's all over now	—	RCA Victor	
1974	Toute la nuit – Plus fort	—	Quinze cent trente quatre	
1974	Bébé tu m'fais flipper quand tu joues mon gazou – Illusion	—	RCA Victor	
1975	Ti-bidon – Fièvre des tropiques	—	RCA Victor	
1975	Ça va brasser – Comment	—	RCA Victor	
1975	Comme d'habitude – Avec la tête, avec le cœur	—	Millionnaires	Reissue, previously released material
1975	Pour toi, pour toi – À t'aimer	—	Millionnaires	Reissue, previously released material
1975	J'entends frapper – Fou de toi	—	Millionnaires	Reissue, previously released material
1975	Ti-Bidon – Mon cœur	—	Millionnaires	Reissue, previously released material
1975	J'ai marché pour une nation – Ton nom imprimé dans mon cœur	—	Millionnaires	Reissue, previously released material
1975	M'lady – L'amour est là	—	Millionnaires	Reissue, previously released material
1975	What the hell I got – Get down	50	Columbia	
1975	Dans la peau – El chicano	—	CBS	
1975	J'entends frapper – Dans la peau	—	CBS	European release
1975	I don't believe it's you – Walking the dog	—	Columbia	
1976	Louise – Nobody	—	Columbia	
1976	Louise – Château d'Espagne	—	CBS	
1976	Émeute dans la prison – Si tu voulais	—	CBS	
1976	Louise – Si tu voulais	—	CBS	European release
1976	Last night – Last night	—	CBS	
1976	Last night – Cross your heart	—	Columbia	
1977	Aujourd'hui – Harpo	—	CBS	
1977	Dock of the bay – Dock of the bay	—	CBS	
1977	Dock of the bay – Laser gypsy	70	CBS	
1977	Gloire à nous – C'est ma fête	—	CBS	
1977	Time race – Time race	—	CBS	
1977	Time race – Tied on	—	CBS	
1977	Le temps presse – Time race	—	CBS	
1977	Le temps presse – Rock'n roll	—	CBS	European release
1977	Happy together – Say you will	—	Columbia	
1978	Spider woman – The stripper	—	Plastic Poison	
1978	T'es pas tout seul à soir – L'ennui cherche l'amour	—	Disques Martin	
1978	C'est comme ça que ça roule dans l'nord – Le p'tit train	—	Disques Martin	
1982	Travailler – Soleil pour des lunes	—	Trans-Canada	
1982	Bamboo – Romantique	—	Trans-Canada	
1982	Quand on fait l'amour – Cinéma	—	Trans-Canada	
1982	Cadillac – Palisades boogie	—	Trans-Canada	
1982	Romantique – Cadillac	—	RCA	European release
1983	Body mind soul – Poison in the heart	—	Big Beat	European release
1983	Rock Billy rock – Travailler	—	Big Beat	European release
1987	Les bombes – Dangereux	—	Aquarius	
1988	L'espion – Insomnie	—	Alert	
1988	Coup de cœur – It's love	—	Alert	
1988	Héros – Juke box	—	Alert	
1990	Sous peine d'amour – Instrumental	—	Audiogram	
1990	Une vie à vivre – Instrumental	—	Audiogram	

=== Compilations ===
Year	Album	Label	Notes
1970	Rock 'n roll	Citation	
1971	Michel Pagliaro	Trans-World	
1972	M'Lady	Trans-World	
1973	21 disques d'or	Les Archives du Disque Québécois	
1975	17 grands succès	Production Multi-Pop	
1981	PAG	Big Beat	European release
1982	ROCK avec PAG	K-Tel	
1987	Avant	Aquarius	
1995	Hit Parade	Audiogram	2 CD
1997	Goodbye Rain	Disques @	
2000	Pag	Mediarock	
2011	Pag collection – Tonnes de flashs	Musicor	13-CD boxset
2015	Greatest Hits	MediaRock	10 songs in English

=== Collaborations and performances as guest star ===
- 1966 Les Chanceliers (Citation); Reissued partially in 1969 Le P'tit Poppy (Tradition)
- 1968 Reels Psychadeliques, vol. 1 (with Ouba) (Revolution)
- 1968 Reels Psychadeliques, vol. 2 (with Ouba) (Revolution)
- 1971 Pagliaro & Martel (with Renée Martel) (Trans-World, Compilation)
- 1972 Michel Pagliaro et les Chanceliers (Tradition, Compilation)
- 1975 Patof – Patof Rock. Michel Pagliaro : electric guitars (uncredited) (Campus)
- 1993 Au nom de l'amour. Héros (new recording); Au nom de l'amour (with the group). (other songs by various artists) (Au Nom de l'Amour)
- 1994 Jacques Higelin – Aux héros de la voltige. Michel Pagliaro : electric guitars on the whole album; arrangements on Le Berceau De la Vie; music on Électrocardiogramme Plat, Hot Chaud and Aux Héros De La Voltige (EMI)
- 2001 Freak Out Total (with Ouba) (Gear Fab, Compilation)
- 2005 Jacques Higelin – Entre 2 gares (Compilation). Michel Pagliaro : guitars (EMI)

== See also ==
- Music of Canada
- Music of Quebec
- Canadian rock
- List of Canadian musicians

Preceded by The Guess Who	Grey Cup Halftime Show; 2001 with Sass Jordan	Succeeded by Shania Twain
