= Daniel Pilon =

Canadian actor (1940–2018)

- Born: November 13, 1940; Montreal, Quebec, Canada
- Died: June 26, 2018 (aged 77); Montreal, Quebec, Canada
- Occupation: Actor
- Years active: 1968–2018

Daniel Pilon (November 13, 1940 – June 26, 2018) was a Canadian actor, known for his role for the television series Dallas as Renaldo "Naldo" Marchetta. In addition to Dallas, he appeared in daytime television soap opera series such as Ryan's Hope, Guiding Light and Days of Our Lives.

== Personal life ==
Pilon was born in Montreal, Quebec. He was the brother of actor Donald Pilon.

After his house was destroyed by the 1994 Northridge earthquake in January 1994, he declared his first bankruptcy in April 1994. That same year, he divorced his wife.

Pilon died in Montreal after a long illness on June 26, 2018, according to his talent agency. He was 77 years old.

== Career ==
Pilon made his movie debut in Le Viol d'une jeune fille douce, directed by Canadian director Gilles Carle.

Pilon was considered for the role of James Bond twice, in 1968 and in 1984.

== Filmography ==
Year	Title	Role	Notes
1968	The Rape of a Sweet Young Girl (Le Viol d'une jeune fille douce)	Raphaël	
1968	Play Dirty	Capt. Allwood	
1969	The Milky Way (La Voie lactée)	François	
1970	Red	Red	
1971	Sex in the Snow (Après-ski)	Phillip	
1971	Malpertuis	Mathias Crook	
1972	Satan's Sabbath (Le Diable est parmi nous)	Paul Drouin	
1972	The Wise Guys (Les Smattes)	Réjean Cardinal	
1972	The Rebels (Quelques arpents de neige)	Simon de Bellefeuille	
1972	Les Indrogables		Short
1973	The Death of a Lumberjack (La Mort d'un bûcheron)	François Paradis	
1974	By the Blood of Others (Par le sang des autres)		
1975	Brannigan	John Gorman	
1977	Starship Invasions	Anaxi	
1979	Plague	Bill Fuller	
1979	The Albertans	Hans Keller	2 episodes
1980	Hot Dogs (Les Chiens chauds)	Frank	
1982	Massarati and the Brain	Mas Massarati	TV movie
1983	The Hamptons	Nick Atwater	1 episode
1983	Missing Pieces	Jorge Martinez	TV movie
1983	Masquerade		1 episode
1984	Love Scenes	Rick	
1984–1985	Dallas	Renaldo "Naldo" Marchetta	9 episodes
1983–1987, 1988	Ryan's Hope	Max Dubujak	
1987	Hitting Home	Max Middleton	TV movie
1988	Malarek	Max Middleton	
1989	Guiding Light	Alan Spaulding #2	27 episodes
1989	Piège infernal	Me Gérard	TV mini-series
1992	Scanners III: The Takeover	Michael	
1992	North of Chiang Mai	Roger	
1992	Casino	Phillip LeMaster	TV movie
1992	Days of Our Lives	Gavin Newirth	27 episodes
1994	The Maharaja's Daughter	Hamilton	3 episodes
1995	No Greater Love	Bert Winfield	TV movie
1995	Vents contraires	Lieutenant Forrester	TV movie
1997	Whiskers	Mr. Mobley	TV movie
1997	Habitat	Strickland	
1997	Suspicious Minds	Richard Whitmore	
1997	The Assignment	Admiral Crawford	
1998	The Sleep Room	James Belding	
1998	Going to Kansas City	Jack Bruckner	
1998	The Ultimate Weapon	McBride	
1998	Musketeers Forever	Julius Bonaparte	
1999	In Her Defense	Robert St. Laurent	
1999	36 Hours to Die	Vaughn	TV movie
1999	Fish Out of Water	Venzal	
1999	Bonanno: A Godfather's Story		TV movie
1999	The Collectors	Det Hackman	TV movie
2000	Island of the Dead	Mayor	TV movie
2000	The List	Mason Powell	
2000	Left Behind	Jonathan Stonegal	
2001	Blind Terror	Clyde Fanning	TV movie
2001	Largo Winch	Charles Adam Arden	1 episode
2001	Bliss	Jack	1 episode
2001–2002	Vampire High	Vakaal	4 episodes
2002	Lathe of Heaven	President Murtle	TV movie
2003	Deception		
2003	Michel Vaillant	Président Rallye Canada	
2004	The Reagans	Donn Moomaw	TV movie
2006	Lance et compte: La revanche	Premier Ministre Marcel Gaudreault	5 episodes
2007	Shoot 'Em Up	Senator Rutledge	
2008	Story of Jen	Melvin	
2009	Wild Roses	John Cameron	3 episodes
2009	Looking for Anne	Jeff	
2010	Krach	Harry Hunt	
2011	L'invité	Antoine	Short, (final film role)
