= Sex in the Snow =

- French: Après-ski
- Directed by: Roger Cardinal
- Written by: Pierre Brousseau
- Produced by: Harry Cohen; Jean Zaloum
- Starring: Daniel Pilon; Céline Lomez
- Cinematography: Roger Racine
- Edited by: Robert Poirier
- Music by: Yves Martin; Jean Zaloum
- Production company: Productions Après ski
- Distributed by: International Film Distributors
- Release date: March 31, 1971
- Running time: 105 minutes
- Country: Canada
- Language: French

Sex in the Snow (French: Après-ski), also known as Sex on Skis, Snowballin' or Winter Games, is a Canadian sex comedy film, directed by Roger Cardinal and released in 1971. Cardinal's full-length directorial debut, the film stars Daniel Pilon as Philippe, a skiing instructor who spends more time romancing and bedding the beautiful women who visit his ski resort than he does actually teaching the sport.

The cast also includes Céline Lomez, Mariette Lévesque, Robert Arcand, Robert Demontigny, Jacques Desrosiers, Pierre Labelle, René Angélil, Janine Sutto, Angèle Coutu, Raymond Lévesque, Pierre Ménard and Charlene Calender.

The film was part of a spate of softcore sexploitation films that came out of Quebec in the late 1960s and early 1970s, alongside films such as Valérie, Here and Now (L'Initiation) and The Apple, the Stem and the Seeds (La pomme, la queue et les pépins).

The film premiered in Quebec in 1971, in a 105-minute version. It was later released to anglophone markets in various shorter, heavily edited versions that highlighted the sex scenes more than the narrative, resulting in it being received much more poorly in English-speaking markets; the American version even inserted some much more hardcore sex scenes not acted by the film's real cast.

At the time of its release, its $800,000 budget made it the most expensive Canadian film ever made, surpassing 1947's Whispering City, although its record was surpassed within two years by Kamouraska.
