= Les Jérolas =

Canadian band

- Years active: 1955-1974
- Past members: Jérôme Lemay; Jean Lapointe

Les Jérolas was a Québécois musical duo active from 1955 to 1974.

== History ==
Les Jérolas formed in 1955. The duo's name comes from the contraction of its two members' names : JÉRÔme Lemay and Jean LApointe. They initially sang in cabarets as fantaisistes and made impressions of politicians and singers. They hired Charlemagne Landry as manager, and in 1956, they obtained a recording deal with RCA Victor. In the same year, they starred in the television show Music-Hall.

They had their first great success on disc with their recordings of two songs by The Coasters in 1959, "Yakety Yak" and "Charlie Brown". Jérôme Lemay also wrote some songs for Les Jérolas, including "Un tiens vaut mieux que deux tu l’auras" and "Signe ton chèque et Méo Penché". Marcel Amont in France covered these songs, and they were translated in English.

In the early 1960s, the Jérolas were the most popular fantaisistes in Quebec and drew great crowds in Quebec's great cabarets. In 1962 they starred in the show En scène les Jérolas hosted by Monique Leyrac. In the same year, they hired the pianist and orchestra conductor Roland Bourque, who worked with them for the rest of their career. In 1963, they were invited to perform on The Ed Sullivan Show.

In 1964, Lapointe had a car accident that immobilized him for months. They were the subject of a documentary by Gilles Carle, Place aux Jérolas. They were in the 1966 movie YUL 871. They won a prize at the Festival du disque in 1966 for Les Jérolas à la Comédie-Canadienne and went at the Olympia on the same year. Les Jérolas continued performing in Quebec's great venues, like the Place des Arts. They returned to the Olympia in 1971. The duo hosted the television quiz Tout l'monde joue... avec les Jérolas in summer 1972 and then performed at the Place des Arts for the last time in 1973.

Jean Lapointe ended Les Jérolas on 1974. Both performers had solo careers afterward.

In 1999, their song "Méo Penché" was named a classic of SOCAN.

In 2011 the group reformed for the show Le grand retour des Jérolas. However, the show ended when Jérôme Lemay had a heart attack at the Place des Arts on the day of the show's premiere.

== Discography ==
Singles
Year	Title
1956	Le mambo du Canada/Lola
1956	Rythme et fantaisie/L’amour et moi
1956	La clé du rock/Y’a pas que
1957	Le chemin du paradis/Toujours plus vite
1957	Chantons la bière et l’amour/Lisette
1958	Souvenirs d’amour/Le rythme de l’amour
1959	Yakety Yak/De toi je veux
1959	Charlie Brown/La danse du printemps
1959	Jones s’est montré/Les trois cloches
1959	Un sourire pour Noël/La veillée chez l’père Jos
1960	Le village de Sainte-Bernadette/Dis-moi qui tu fréquentes
1960	Un tiens vaut mieux que deux tu l’auras/La chanson du hockey
1961	Matilda/Ferme tes jolis yeux
1961	Le carnaval de Montréal/Rigolo
1961	Méo Penché/N’as-tu jamais
1962	Tout l’monde twist/Écoute bien
1962	Cola Café/Une fille de Montréal
1962	Maria Christina/Jack Monoloy
1963	Je t’aime/Au pays des Incas
1963	Ce soir tu reviens/Grand-père
1963	Carnaval d’hiver international/International Winter Carnaval
1964	Ne dors pas/Un peu de sucre
1964	J’prends plus un coup/Pour faire un duo
1965	Yayaje n’suis pas tout à moi/Conchelita
1966	Les mouches au plafond/Sylvie, oh Sylvie
1966	Montréal/Trouvez-moi quelque chose de plus joli que ça
1967	Le malchanceux/Popeye
1967	Alors messieurs/Le mouton noir
196?	Bombardier Ski-Doo
1970	Non mais c’est pas beau ça/Les éléphants
1970	Chérie, chérie, chérie/C’que ça m’énerve
1971	Viens voir le baseball/Rusty
1971	Beautiful Downtown Sorel/Borriquito
1972	Lefty Ding-Ding Lapointe/Demain mon fils
1973	J’aime pas l’ail, j’aime pas l’eau, j’aime l’impôt/Reste avec moi
1974	Méo Penché/Yakety Yak

Albums
Year	Title
1959	Les Jérolas
1961	Les Jérolas sont là
1962	Les Jérolas au Théâtre national
1962	Toujours plus vite
1964	Les Jérolas à La Porte Saint-Jean
1966	Les Jérolas à la Comédie-Canadienne
1966	Succès souvenirs: Les Jérolas
1966	Montréal: un portrait musical
1966	Les Jérolas à l’Olympia
1967	Es-tu content
1968	Le tribunal des vedettes
1971	Quinze ans déjà
1972	Les grands succès des Jérolas
1973	Ça va barder
1978	Les Jérolas
