= Captive (1998 film) =

- DVD cover.
- Directed by: Roger Cardinal
- Written by: Rodney Gibbons; Richard Stanford
- Produced by: Stephen Maynard; Holly Simpson
- Starring: Erika Eleniak; Michael Ironside; Catherine Colvey
- Cinematography: Bruno Philip
- Edited by: Michael Doherty
- Music by: David Findley
- Distributed by: Planet Media
- Release date: 1998
- Running time: 92 minutes
- Country: Canada
- Language: English

Captive is a 1998 Canadian crime-drama thriller film directed by Roger Cardinal, starring Erika Eleniak and Michael Ironside. It is distributed by Planet Media.

== Plot ==
After a suicide attempt, Samantha Hoffman finds herself trapped in an insane asylum.

== Cast ==
- Erika Eleniak as Samantha Hoffman
- Michael Ironside as Detective Briscoe
- Catherine Colvey as Doctor Kossim
- Adrienne Ironside as Lissy McHale
- Jack Langedijk as Sal Hoffman
- Don Jordan as Police officer
- Michel Perron as Jarvik
- Larry Day as Bailey
- Jane Wheeler as Female administrator
- Gouchy Boy as Orderly
- Steve Adams as Security guard
- Alain Goulem as Nurse Lasky
- Patrick Kerton as Orderly
