= Roger Cardinal (director) =

Canadian film director

Roger Cardinal (1940 - 2017) was a Canadian film director from Quebec. He was most noted for the 1988 film Malarek, for which he was a Genie Award nominee for Best Director at the 10th Genie Awards in 1989.

His other credits included the films The Storm, Sex in the Snow (Après-ski), The Apparition (L'Apparition), Captive, Dead Silent, Risque and Brilliant, and episodes of the television series Urban Angel, Au nom du père et du fils and René Lévesque.
