= Monsieur Tranquille =

Character in the Canadian children's television series Patof voyage

- Patof raconte Patof voyage Monsieur Tranquille; Le monde de Monsieur Tranquille character
- Monsieur Tranquille
- First appearance: September 1976
- Created by: Éric Mérinat, Daniel Tremblay (design), Mérinat Marionettes
- Portrayed by: Roger Giguère
- Voiced by: Roger Giguère
- Alias: Lesley Tranquille
- Nickname: Tranquille
- Spouse: Farnande

Monsieur Tranquille is a character in the Canadian children's television series Patof voyage. He is well known for the 1977 disco hit Ma'm Thibault. He was portrayed by actor-comedian Roger Giguère.

== Children's TV shows ==
Mr. Tranquille is first mentioned in the television series Patof raconte (CFTM-TV, 1975). Played by the soundman Roger Giguère, he is an invisible character who interacts with the clown Patof through sound and music effects. It is only in the series Patof voyage (CFTM-TV, 1976) that Roger Giguère embodies him as a puppet.

Lesley Tranquille (a play on words meaning "leave him alone") quickly captures the hearts of children. In January 1977, a single titled Madame Thibault becomes a number one hit in Quebec. A disco version of the song, mostly instrumental except for the phrase "Ma'm Thibault," is created and becomes a club hit. The single is even released in France and Australia, where it gains immense popularity. The song is credited to "Tranquille" to differentiate it from the TV character and is also included on a K-tel double-LP compilation called Disco Fever (1978).

In September 1977, Mr. Tranquille received his own television series called Monsieur Tranquille (CFTM-TV, 1977). To enhance the character's popularity, two LPs, several coloring books and posters, as well as a series of eight comic books illustrated by Henri Desclez, were published.

The following season, a new series titled Le monde de Monsieur Tranquille (CFTM-TV, 1978) was created with a more educational focus. However, the series was canceled midway through the season, largely due to competition with the highly popular Bobino on rival Ici Radio-Canada Télé, which aired in the same timeslot.

Despite having a short career, Mr. Tranquille captured the imagination of a generation of Québécois. Songs such Faut pas me chercher (a duet with Patof, 1976), Madame Thibault (1977), Ça va pas dans l'soulier? (1977), Les monstres (1977), Farnande (1977) and Pepperoni are among his greatest hits.

== Filmography ==
=== Television series ===
- 1975-1976 Patof raconte
- 1976-1977 Patof voyage
- 1977-1978 Monsieur Tranquille
- 1978 Le monde de Monsieur Tranquille

=== DVD ===
- 2011 Bonjour Patof (Musicor Produits Spéciaux)

== Discography ==
=== Albums ===
Year	Album	Label	Qc chart	Notes
1977	Monsieur Tranquille – Faut pas m'chercher	Les disques P.A.X.	N°3	
1977	Monsieur Tranquille – Superstar	Les disques P.A.X.	—	
1977	Eugène – Les chansons d'Eugène	T.M./P.A.X.	—	Eugène Album (performed by Jacques Desrosiers)

=== Singles ===
Year	Single	Label	Qc chart	Notes
1976	Faut pas me chercher (Monsieur Tranquille and Patof) – Mon ami Pierrot	Campus	— —	Patof Single
1977	Madame Thibault – Faut pas m'chercher	Les Disques P.A.X. inc.	N°1 —	
1977	Madame Thibault (version disco) – Madame Thibault (version disco)	Les Disques P.A.X. inc.	— —	12 in. single; Time : 6:47; Tempo : 112 BPM; Mixed by Mike Delaney at Studio Six Montréal
1977	Pepperoni – La chanson des martiens	Les Disques P.A.X. inc.	N°21 —	
1978	Le monde de M. Tranquille – Il a réponse à tout	TMPX	— —	

==== European release ====
Year	Single	Label	Chart	Notes
1977	Ma'm Thibault (version disco) – Ma'm Thibault (vocal)	Vogue	— —	Short disco version (±3 min.)
1977	Ma'm Thibault (version disco) – Dracula Disco (Gerry Bribosia)	Vogue	— —	12 in. single, promo, "Ma'm Thibault" disco version of 6:47 min.

==== Australian release ====
Year	Single	Label	Chart	Notes
1977	Ma'm Thibault (Tranquille) – Dracula Disco (Gerry Bribosia)	Miracle	— —	12 in. single, "Ma'm Thibault" disco version of 6:47 min.

=== Compilations ===
Year	Album	Label	Chart	Notes
1979	Les super grands succès de Mr Tranquille + ses trois nouvelles productions	Totem	—	

=== Collaborations and performances as guest star ===
Year	Album	Collaborator	Notes
1976	Super Patof	Patof	Contains "Faut pas me chercher" by Patof with Monsieur Tranquille (Campus, PA 49312)

=== Charts ===
==== Reconstituted chart ====
===== Songs =====
Title / Date / Best rank / Weeks on chart

- 1977 Madame Thibault / 1977-01-29 / #1 / 19 weeks on chart
- 1978 Pepperoni / 1978-02-18 / #21 / 3 weeks on chart

===== Albums =====
Title / Date / Best rank / Weeks on Top 30

- 1977 Monsieur Tranquille – Faut pas m'chercher / 1977-03-05 / #3 / 12 weeks in Top 30

== Bibliography ==
=== Comics ===
- 1977 Monsieur Tranquille – N° 1 (illustrated by Henri Desclez; text by Claude Leclerc), Éditions Héritage
- 1977 Monsieur Tranquille – N° 2 (illustrated by Henri Desclez; text by Claude Leclerc), Éditions Héritage
- 1977 Monsieur Tranquille – N° 3 : Super-diva (illustrated by Henri Desclez; text by Claude Leclerc), Éditions Héritage
- 1977 Monsieur Tranquille – N° 4 : Un numéro super explosif! (avec Junior Tranquille et Minibus) (illustrated by Henri Desclez; text by Claude Leclerc), Éditions Héritage
- 1977 Monsieur Tranquille – N° 5 : Un numéro spatial (avec Junior Tranquille et Minibus) (illustrated by Henri Desclez; text by Claude Leclerc), Éditions Héritage
- 1977 Monsieur Tranquille – N° 6 : Un numéro fumeux!... (11 pages de jeux et d'activités) (illustrated by Henri Desclez; text by Claude Leclerc), Éditions Héritage
- 1978 Monsieur Tranquille – N° 7 (illustrated by Henri Desclez; text by Claude Leclerc), Éditions Héritage
- 1978 Monsieur Tranquille – N° 8 (illustrated by Henri Desclez; text by Claude Leclerc), Éditions Héritage

== Awards and Recognitions ==
- 1977 Golden record for the single Madame Thibault

== See also ==
- List of disco artists (L-R)
