= Gilles Gascon =

Canadian cinematographer and film maker

Gilles Gascon was a Canadian cinematographer and documentary filmmaker. He was most noted for his work on Jacques Giraldeau's 1966 documentary film Element 3 (Élément 3), for which he won the Canadian Film Award for Best Colour Cinematography at the 19th Canadian Film Awards in 1967.

His other cinematography credits included the films In the Labyrinth, It Isn't Jacques Cartier's Fault (C'est pas la faute à Jacques Cartier) and YUL 871.

As a documentarian he directed the films Québec en silence (1969), If at First (1969), Peut-être Maurice Richard (1971), C'est pas chinois (1974), Mercredi - Petits souliers, petit pain (1977) and Firearms and Safety (1979).

He was the brother of actors Jean Gascon and Gabriel Gascon.
