= Plague (1979 film) =

- American film poster
- Directed by: Ed Hunt
- Written by: Ed Hunt; Barry Pearson
- Produced by: Ed Hunt; Barry Pearson
- Starring: Daniel Pilon; Kate Reid; Celine Lomez; Michael J. Reynolds
- Music by: Eric N. Robertson
- Release date: July 11, 1979
- Countries: Canada; United States
- Budget: $CAD 525,000 (estimated)

Plague is a 1979 Canadian-American science fiction film about a genetic engineering accident, a fertilizing bacterium that escapes from a laboratory in Canada. The film is also known internationally as Induced Syndrome (UK), M-3: The Gemini Strain or Mutation (USA).

== Plot ==
When a group of scientist work to develop a bacterium to increase food yields is delayed by bureaucratic processes, Dr. Celia Graham (Brenda Donahue) ignores protocols and develops a bacteria called M3.

The new bacteria is accidentally released and causes sickness in children and death in others around the world. The disease is highly contagious, and the epidemic increases geometrically. Dr. Graham is killed by the virus, while an infected but unaffected woman spreads the disease in the manner of Typhoid Mary.

Scientists Dr. Bill Fuller (Daniel Pilon) and Dr. Jessica Morgan (Kate Reid) work tirelessly to develop an antidote to stop the contagion.

== Cast ==
- Daniel Pilon as Dr. Bill Fuller
- Kate Reid as Dr. Jessica Morgan
- Celine Lomez as Margo Simar the Carrier
- Michael J. Reynolds as Dr. Dave McKay
- John Kerr as Escaping guard
- Brenda Donahue as Dr. Celia Graham

== Release ==
The film was released theatrically in the United States by Group 1 International Distribution Organization Ltd. in January 1979.

The film was released on DVD in the United Kingdom from Prism Leisure Corporation as part of a 4-film collection (with Bram Stoker's Legend of the Mummy 2, Howling IV: The Original Nightmare and Night of the Living Dead) on October 7, 2002. It was also release individually from Prism Leisure, and by Digital Entertainment Ltd in 2008. As of 2018, the film has still not been officially released on DVD in the United States.

== Reception ==
Creature Feature gave the movie two out of five stars. TV Guide found that the focus on the scientists in charge of finding the cure to be a plus, that overall the movie was laughable. Moira also gave the movie two stars, finding it dull and offering nothing original in the plague movie genre. It also found the production values to be shabby and its portrayal of a biolab's operating procedures to be lacking.

== Awards ==
Nominated for best picture at the 1979 Catalonian International Film Festival and winner of the best screenplay at the same festival.
