= Gina (film) =

- Directed by: Denys Arcand
- Written by: Jacques Poulin; Alain Dostie
- Produced by: Luc Lamy; Pierre Lamy
- Starring: Celine Lomez; Claude Blanchard; Serge Thériault; Gabriel Arcand
- Cinematography: Alain Dostie
- Edited by: Denys Arcand
- Music by: Benny Barbara; Michel Pagliaro
- Release date: January 23, 1975
- Running time: 95 minutes
- Country: Canada
- Language: French

Gina is a Canadian drama film from Quebec, directed by Denys Arcand and released in 1975. The film stars Celine Lomez as Gina, a stripper who, after being raped in a motel room, hires two criminal thugs to exact her revenge on the rapists.

== Synopsis ==
Three parallel story lines draw an exploited hotel stripper (Lomez) who is sent to work a small Quebec town, a drunken gang of hell-raising snowmobilers, and a film crew attempting to shoot a political documentary about exploited textile workers (echoing Denys Arcand's own NFB-banned documentary On est au coton), together into a mixture of action, violence against women, and film as a political tool.
