= YUL 871 =

1966 Canadian film

- Directed by: Jacques Godbout
- Written by: Jacques Godbout
- Produced by: André Belleau
- Starring: Charles Denner
- Cinematography: Georges Dufaux; Gilles Gascon
- Edited by: Victor Jobin
- Music by: François Dompierre; Stéphane Venne
- Production company: National Film Board of Canada
- Release date: July 12, 1966 (Karlovy Vary)
- Running time: 70 minutes
- Country: Canada
- Language: French
- Budget: $196,869

YUL 871 is a Canadian drama film, directed by Jacques Godbout and released in 1966. The film stars Charles Denner as an unnamed Romanian Jewish engineer who is in Montreal on a business trip, although it centres primarily on his personal experiences during the trip, including his search for information about his parents who disappeared in Romania during World War II, and his brief love affair with a younger woman.

The film's cast also includes Andrée Lachapelle, Paul Buissonneau, Francine Landry, Jean Duceppe, Jacques Desrosiers, Louise Marleau and Claude Préfontaine. Musical comedy duo Les Jérolas, consisting of Jérôme Lemay and Jean Lapointe, also appear in the film performing songs.

The film's title refers to the engineer's flight to Montreal; YUL is the IATA code for what was then known as Montreal-Dorval International Airport. Godbout stated the film's positioning of the engineer as Jewish was to set up a parallel between the Jewish people's history of displacement and victimization and the status of the Québécois people.

The film premiered on July 12, 1966 at the Karlovy Vary Film Festival, before its theatrical release in Quebec theatres in August. An English dub of the film was also later released. The French version was subsequently broadcast by Télévision de Radio-Canada in 1969, and the English version was broadcast by the fledgling Global Television Network in 1974.

== Works cited ==
- Evans, Gary (1991). In the National Interest: A Chronicle of the National Film Board of Canada from 1949 to 1989. University of Toronto Press. ISBN 0802027849.
