= Michael J. Reynolds =

Canadian actor (1939–2018)

- Born: August 15, 1939; Toronto, Ontario, Canada
- Died: March 28, 2018 (aged 78); Somerset, England
- Other name: Michael Reynolds
- Occupation: Actor
- Years active: 1971–2013
- Spouse: Katherine

Michael John Reynolds (15 August 1939 – 22 March 2018) was a Canadian actor with roles in more than forty films and eighty television films and series.

== Career ==
Reynolds was born in Toronto, Ontario.

As a screen actor, Reynolds was active in theatrical films and television shows since the early 1970s.

Film

Some of Reynolds feature films include, Plague (1979), Police Academy (1984), Gorillas in the Mist (1988), Fly Away Home (1996), United 93 (2006), and Charlie Countryman (2013).

Television

On television, Reynolds had a starring role on the family-oriented adventure series Search and Rescue: The Alpha Team as Dr. Bob Donell for two seasons (1977–1978).

He had guest appearances on The Twilight Zone (1989), Counterstrike (1993), Earth: Final Conflict (1998), and Lexx (2002), among others.

Reynolds appeared in numerous television films and miniseries, including The War Between the Tates (1977), The Last Best Year (1990), Net Worth (1995), and World War II Behind Closed Doors: Stalin, the Nazis and the West (2008).

== Personal life and death ==
Reynolds retired from acting and moved to England only a few years before his death. Reynolds died of cancer in Somerset, England on March 28, 2018 at the age of 78, survived by his wife Katherine.

== Filmography ==
=== Film ===
Michael J. Reynolds film credits include the following.

- The Reincarnate (1971) – David Payne
- The Neptune Factor (1973) – Dr. Hal Hamilton
- Age of Innocence (Ragtime Summer) (1977) – Helmut
- Why Shoot the Teacher? (1977) – Bert Field
- Plague (1979) – Dr. Dave McKay
- Fish Hawk (1979) – Mr. Gideon
- Bear Island (1979) – Heyter
- Wild Horse Hank (1979) – Rankin
- The Kidnapping of the President (1980) – MacKenzie
- Visiting Hours (1982) – Porter Halstrom
- Running Brave (1983) – Roger Douglas, Insurance Executive
- Police Academy (1984) – Office Executive
- Street Smart (1987) – Art Sheffield
- Too Outrageous! (1987)
- Blue Monkey (1987) – Albert Hooper
- Rolling Vengeance (1987) – Lt. Sly Sullivan
- Deep Sea Conspiracy (1987) – Dr. Cambridge
- Gorillas in the Mist (1988) – Howard Dowd
- Iron Eagle II (1988) – Secretary
- Millennium (1989) – Jerry Bannister
- Clearcut (1991) – Hunter
- Tafelspitz (1994) – Mr. Nicholson
- Blown Away (1994) – Wedding Band #1
- Fly Away Home (1996) – General Hadfield
- Extreme Measures (1996) – Judge
- That Old Feeling (1997) – Senator Marks
- All I Wanna Do (1998) – Mr. Armstrong
- Down (The Shaft) (2001) – President
- The 51st State (Formula 51) (2001) – Mr. Escobar
- Out for a Kill (2003, video) – Dean
- Blessed (2004) – Dr. Lehman
- Where the Truth Lies (2005) – John Hillman
- United 93 (2006) – Patrick Joseph Driscoll
- Dark Corners (2006) – Dr. Richardson
- The Walker (2007) – Ethan Withal
- Freakdog (Red Mist) (2008) – Dr. Stegman
- The Descent Part 2 (2009) – Ed Oswald
- Leap Year (2010) – Jerome
- Charlie Countryman (2013) – Doctor

=== Television ===
Michael J. Reynolds television credits
Year	Title	Role	Notes	Ref.
1972	The Discoverers	Dr. Frederick Banting	TV movie	
1974	The National Dream: Building the Impossible Railway	Andrew Onderdonk	TV miniseries	
1974	Police Surgeon	Barney Ames	1 episode	
1977	Flight to Holocaust	Elevator Rescue Worker	TV movie	
1977	The War Between the Tates	Chuck	TV movie	
1977	The Fighting Men	Maj. Burns	TV movie	
1977–1978	Search and Rescue: The Alpha Team	Dr. Bob Donell	26 episodes	
1980	F.D.R.: The Last Year	Unknown	TV movie	
1981	Escape from Iran: The Canadian Caper	Unknown	TV movie	
1983	Between Friends	Kevin Sullivan	TV movie	
1983	A Case of Libel	James Baldwin	TV movie	
1983	The Littlest Hobo	Philip	1 episode	
1984	Empire	Chip Chisholm	1 episode	
1984	A Matter of Sex	Bruce Jennings	TV movie	
1984	Heartsounds	Dr. Roberts	TV movie	
1984	Charlie Grant's War	Blair	TV movie	
1985	Kane & Abel	John Preston	TV miniseries	
1986	Spearfield's Daughter	Court Chairman	TV miniseries	
1986	Doing Life	Parole Board Member	TV movie	
1986	Unnatural Causes	The Major	TV movie	
1986	The Truth About Alex	Major Stevens	TV movie	
1987	Walking on Air	Mr. McDowell	TV movie	
1987	Seeing Things	Phillips	1 episode	
1987	Captain Power and the Soldiers of the Future	Briggs	1 episode	
1987	Sadie and Son	Commander	TV movie	
1987	Echoes in the Darkness	O'Brien (uncredited)	TV miniseries	
1988	T. and T.	Judge Weaver	1 episode	
1988	War and Remembrance	Unknown	TV miniseries	
1988	Alfred Hitchcock Presents	Potter	1 episode	
1988	Street Legal	Judge Boone	1 episode	
1988	No Blame	Sam	TV movie	
1988	Betrayal of Silence	Barrington	TV movie	
1989	The Twilight Zone	Commander Delhart	Episode: "The Cold Equations"	
1989	Day One	Kenneth Bainbridge	TV movie	
1989	Sorry, Wrong Number	Henry	TV movie	
1989	Rin Tin Tin: K-9 Cop	Unknown	1 episode	
1990	The Last Best Year	Wisnovsky	TV movie	
1992	Teamster Boss: The Jackie Presser Story	Brock	TV movie	
1992	Deadly Matrimony	Judge Zagel	TV movie	
1993	Top Cops	Unknown	1 episode	
1993	Counterstrike	Governor Jim Donnely	Episode: "Clear Cut"	
1993	Trial & Error	Governor Nelson	TV movie	
1993	Matrix	Ned Hopper	1 episode	
1994	The Lifeforce Experiment	Jack Aspect	TV movie. AKA Dead Men Talk	
1994	Due South	Senior Official	1 episode	
1994	Kung Fu: The Legend Continues	Unknown	1 episode	
1995	Almost Golden: The Jessica Savitch Story	Ken Green	TV movie	
1995	Net Worth	Clarence Campbell	TV movie	
1996	Lives of Girls & Women	Baptist Preacher	TV movie	
1996	Her Desperate Choice	Jim's Father	TV movie	
1996	The Morrison Murders: Based on a True Story	Judge	TV movie	
1996	What Kind of Mother Are You?	Brian Coulter	TV movie	
1996	Traders	Unknown	1 episode	
1997	La Femme Nikita	General	1 episode	
1997	Let Me Call You Sweetheart	Judge	TV movie	
1997	PSI Factor: Chronicles of the Paranormal	Edward Baines	1 episode	
1997	Ms. Scrooge	Ghost of Christmas Past	TV movie	
1998	The Fixer	Dr. Scharber	TV movie	
1998	Earth: Final Conflict	President Thompson	1 episode	
1998	My Own Country	Young Man's Father	TV movie	
1998	My Father's Shadow: The Sam Sheppard Story	Judge Suster	TV movie	
1999	Hard Time: The David Milgaard Story	Bob Caldwell	TV movie	
1999	Cruel Justice	Andrew Callihan	TV movie	
1999	In the Company of Spies	Navy Admiral	TV movie	
1999	A Secret Affair	Charles Stewart	TV movie	
2000	My Hero	Doc	1 episode	
2000	Perfect World	Michael Hudson	1 episode	
2002	Lexx	Colonel Donald K. Gore	1 episode	
2003	Days That Shook the World	General J. T. Farrel	1 episode	
2008	World War II Behind Closed Doors: Stalin, the Nazis and the West	Gen. George C. Marshall	TV documentary. 3 episodes	
2009	Moonshot	Gene Aldrin	TV movie	
2012	The Other Wife	Mine Foreman	TV miniseries	
2013	The Curse of Edgar	Joe Kennedy	TV movie	
2013	De prooi	Arthur Martinez	TV miniseries	
