= René Angélil =

Canadian musical producer, talent manager, and singer (1942–2016)

René Angélil CM OQ
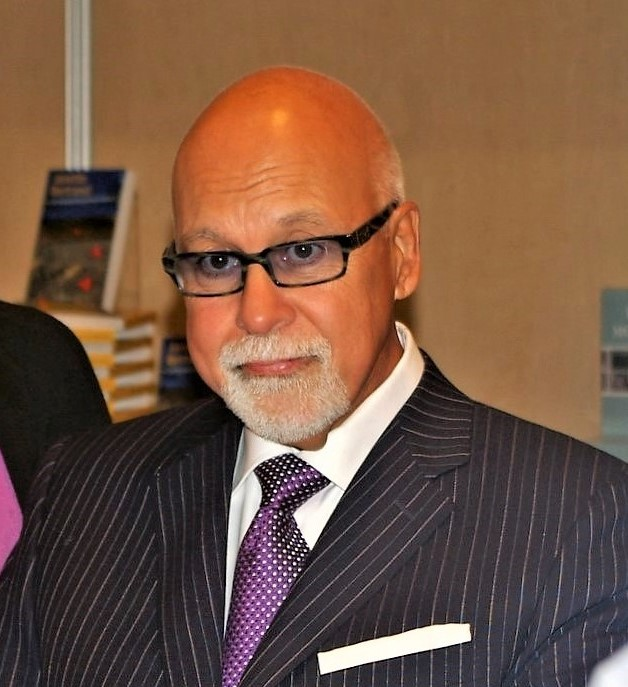
- Angélil in 2009
- Born: 16 January 1942; Montreal, Quebec, Canada
- Died: 14 January 2016 (aged 73); Las Vegas, Nevada, U.S.
- Resting place: Notre Dame des Neiges Cemetery, Montréal
- Occupations: Talent manager; record producer; singer; songwriter; businessman
- Years active: 1961–2016
- Spouses: Denyse Duquette (m. 1966; div. 1972) Anne Renée (m. 1973; div. 1985) Celine Dion (m. 1994)
- Children: 6

René Angélil CM OQ (French pronunciation: [ʁəne ɑ̃ʒelil]; 16 January 1942 – 14 January 2016) was a Canadian musical producer, talent manager, and singer. He was the husband and longtime manager of singer Celine Dion.

== Early life ==
Angélil was born in Montreal, Quebec, to a father of Syrian descent and a mother of Lebanese origin. His father, Joseph Angélil, was born in Montreal to parents from Damascus, Syria, and his mother, Alice Sara, was born in Montreal to Lebanese parents. He was the older of two children and had one brother. Both of his parents were members of the Melkite Greek Catholic Church. Angélil studied at Collège Saint-Viateur (high school) in Outremont and at Collège André-Grasset (post-secondary) in Montreal.

== Career ==
Angélil began his career in 1961 as a pop singer in Montreal. He formed the pop rock group Les Baronets with childhood friends Pierre Labelle and Jean Beaulne. The group enjoyed several hits during the 1960s, mainly French-language adaptations of popular songs from the United Kingdom and the United States, including "C'est fou, mais c'est tout" in 1964, a translation of The Beatles' "Hold Me Tight". After the group disbanded in 1972, Angélil and his close friend Guy Cloutier began managing artists.

Together, they managed the careers of several successful Québec entertainers, including René Simard and Ginette Reno, along with many other pop artists of the era. The partnership ended in 1981, with both men continuing as solo managers. That same year, shortly after being dismissed as Reno's manager and considering leaving the music industry to study law, Angélil heard Celine Dion's demo tape while being considered as a potential producer for her album. He soon became her agent. He continued to manage her career until June 2014, when he stepped down due to cancer.

In 2012, Angélil became one of several co-owners of Montreal's iconic Schwartz's Deli.

He also appeared occasionally in film and television, including a supporting role in Sex in the Snow (Après-ski) and a leading role in The Apparition (L'Apparition).

Angélil also negotiated Dion's long-running residency at the Colosseum at Caesars Palace in Las Vegas. According to Georges-Hébert Germain's biography Le maître du jeu, he persuaded AEG owner Philip Anschutz to back a permanent show and structured the deal so that Angélil and AEG covered the production costs in exchange for a larger share of the profits.

== Personal life ==
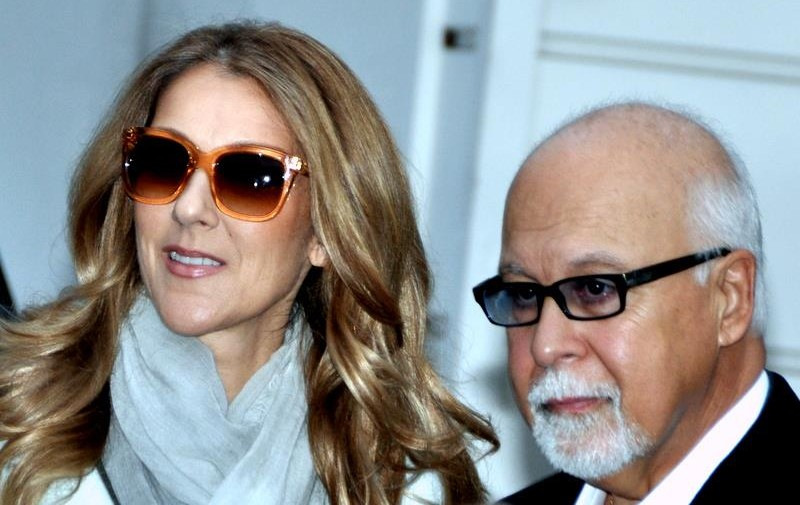
Céline Dion and Angélil in 2012

In 1966, Angélil married his first wife, Denyse Duquette. Their son was born in 1968, and the couple divorced in 1972. He married singer Anne Renée in 1974; they had two children before divorcing in 1986. Their daughter married singer Marc Dupré in 2000.

Angélil was sent a tape of then 12‑year‑old singer Céline Dion and invited her to audition in Quebec. He began managing her career soon after, taking Dion and her mother on tour in Canada, Japan, and Europe. He mortgaged his home to finance her first album in 1981.

Angélil and Dion began a personal relationship in 1988 when she was twenty years old. Their first date took place the night Dion won the Eurovision Song Contest on 30 April 1988. Her mother initially opposed the relationship due to their 26‑year age difference and Angélil's previous marriages, but eventually accepted it as most of the family was supportive. The couple married on 17 December 1994. Their lavish ceremony at Montreal's Notre‑Dame Basilica was broadcast live on Canadian television.

After Angélil was diagnosed with throat cancer in 1999, and before beginning radiation treatment, the couple turned to in vitro fertilisation. Their efforts received extensive media attention. Their son, René‑Charles Angélil, was born on 25 January 2001. Dion suffered a miscarriage in 2009, then gave birth to twin boys on 23 October 2010. The twins were named Eddy, after Eddy Marnay, who produced Dion's first five albums, and Nelson, after former South African president Nelson Mandela.

Angélil and Dion were devoted fans of the Montreal Canadiens NHL team and close friends of former Quebec Nordiques / Colorado Avalanche president and general manager Pierre Lacroix.

Montreal Jubilation Choir founder Trevor Payne said that "backstage, out of the eye of the general public, they were the kindest, most down‑to‑earth superstars that I've ever known in my entire career."

=== Defamation suit ===
In 2001, Angélil and Dion filed a $5 million defamation lawsuit against the Quebec tabloid Allô Vedettes, which alleged that the couple paid $5,001 to rent the swimming pool at Caesars Palace in Las Vegas so that Dion could sunbathe topless and Angélil could swim nude. The couple denied the claim.

== Gambling ==
Angélil was an avid poker player, qualifying for the 2005 World Series of Poker Tournament of Champions and finishing in the money at the 2007 Mirage Poker Showdown on the World Poker Tour, a series of high‑stakes tournaments. He was also rumoured to be a committed gambler away from the poker table. Reports claimed he wagered as much as $1 million a week at Caesars Palace and maintained a line of credit for the same amount at the Bellagio. In 2007, casino executive and former Las Vegas mayor Jan Jones stated that Angélil gambled $1 million a week, but later retracted the comment. Caesars Palace subsequently released a statement detailing Angélil's gambling wins and losses with his permission.

== Later life, illness and death ==
Angélil suffered a heart attack in 1991 at age 49. In 1999, he was diagnosed with throat cancer and made a full recovery after treatment. He appeared in the video for Simple Plan's song "Save You" as a cancer survivor. In 2009, Angélil reportedly underwent a planned heart‑related medical procedure to address arterial blockage.

Angélil had surgery in December 2013 for a recurrence of throat cancer. In June 2014, he stepped down as Dion's manager to focus on his health, though he remained involved in business decisions related to her career. In September 2015, Dion announced that Angélil's cancer had progressed and that he had only "months to live". At the national funeral, his eldest son with Dion, René-Charles, delivered the eulogy before about 700 mourners; the service was broadcast live in Quebec and streamed internationally.

Angélil died on 14 January 2016 of throat cancer, aged 73. He died two days before his 74th birthday.

On 3 February 2016, a public "Celebration of Life" tribute was held at the Colosseum at Caesars Palace, attended by Dion, her family, Angélil's children from previous marriages and his brother. When Dion returned to the Colosseum stage after his death, the show opened with a video tribute to Angélil, which was repeated before her performances over the following weeks.

He received a national funeral at Montreal's Notre‑Dame Basilica on 22 January, and was buried at the Notre Dame des Neiges Cemetery.

Following Angélil's death, Dion became the sole owner and president of her management and production companies, including CDA Productions and Les Productions Feeling.

== Legacy and honours ==
- 1987 and 1988: Félix Award for Manager of the Year.
- June 2009: appointed a Chevalier of the National Order of Quebec.
- July 2013: appointed a Member of the Order of Canada.
- 22 January 2016: flags were flown at half-mast on Quebec and Montreal government buildings in his memory, and an official national funeral was held at Notre‑Dame Basilica.
- 15 February 2016: honoured during the annual Grammy Award 'In Memoriam' tribute.
- 14 May 2021: asteroid 241364 Reneangelil, discovered by amateur astronomer Michel Ory in 2008, was named by the Working Group for Small Bodies Nomenclature in his honour.

== Representation in other media ==
- In July 2008, Angélil was named the fictional principal for the reality television show Star Académie during its fourth season in 2009. He reprised the role in the show's two subsequent runs in 2009 and 2012.
- Angélil was portrayed by actor Enrico Colantoni in the 2008 television biopic Céline.
- In the 2021 film Aline, directed by and starring Valérie Lemercier and loosely inspired by Dion's life, the character based on Angélil was portrayed by Sylvain Marcel, an actor from Dion's hometown of Charlemagne.
