= It Isn't Jacques Cartier's Fault =

- French: C'est pas la faute à Jacques Cartier
- Directed by: Clément Perron; Georges Dufaux
- Screenplay by: Clément Perron; Georges Dufaux
- Starring: Jacques Desrosiers; Paul Buissonneau; Paul Hébert
- Cinematography: Gilles Gascon
- Edited by: Georges Dufaux; Claude Godbout; Clément Perron
- Production company: National Film Board of Canada
- Release date: 1968
- Country: Canada

It Isn't Jacques Cartier's Fault (French: C'est pas la faute à Jacques Cartier) is a Canadian comedy film, directed by Clément Perron and Georges Dufaux and released in 1968. The film centres on a family of American tourists in Montreal, who are being accompanied around the city by a tour guide who is romantically interested in the family's oldest daughter.

The film's cast includes Jacques Desrosiers, Michèle Chicoine, Mary Gay, Michael Devine, Paul Buissonneau, Lisette Gervais and Paul Hébert.

It was an entrant for Best Feature Film at the Canadian Film Awards, but lost to The Ernie Game.
