= Yvan Dufresne =

Canadian manager and producer

- Born: 1930; Montreal, Quebec, Canada
- Died: November 13, 2016 (aged 85–86); Montreal, Quebec, Canada
- Occupations: Manager, Producer

Yvan Dufresne (1930 – 13 November 2016) was a Canadian manager and producer from Quebec.

== Biography ==
Yvan Dufresne was born in 1930 in Montreal, Quebec, Canada, son to the tenor singer Georges Dufresne.

Dufresne studied double bass at the Conservatoire de musique de Montréal then singing with Bernard Diamant. He sang lieder on the radio shows Radio-Bigoudis and Au bord de la rivière, and in some television shows.

Dufresne became a representative for the label Musimart. He was drawn to popular music through the preliminaries of the first Concours de la chanson canadienne, in 1956. He then became artistic director for the Canadian production of the label Apex in 1958, lasting until 1962. Tasked with finding Canadian talents, he recruited Michel Louvain in 1957, and within a few months made him a great star. In 1961, he launched the career of Donald Lautrec, of whom he would be the manager during the 1960s.

In 1964, Dufresne founded his own recording company, Jupiter, which would eventually produce for artists such as Donald Lautrec, Jacques Michel, Marc Gélinas, Pierre Létourneau, Steve Fiset and others. He was manager to Jacques Michel, Dominique Michel, Denise Filiatrault and Pauline Julien. He was Jupiter's president from 1963 to 1970.

From 1970 to 1979 or from 1972 to 1976, Dufresne was director of the French branch of the label London. With Télémédia he created the company Discotel in 1975, of which he was director general from 1979 to 1983. He was elected president of the ADISQ in 1981, lasting until 1982. From 1983 to 1987, he was director of the Éditions Beau Rivage et Bleu Rivage.

After two of his friends died from AIDS in 1994, Dufresne founded the Fonds de recherche pour l’étude sur le Sida Québec (FRESQ).

Yvan Dufresne notably produced Ginette Reno, Pierre Lalonde, Les Hou-Lops, Tony Roman and Chantal Renaud. He used television to promote artists that he produced. He encouraged them to adapt American pop songs and use new music genres popular in the United States.

Dufresne was inducted in the Canadian Songwriters Hall of Fame in 2011. On the same year, he won the Héritage CMPA Award from the Association des éditeurs de musique du Canada. He received a Félix homage on 27 October 2016.

He died on 13 November 2016 in Montreal.
