= Georges Dufaux =

Canadian film director and cinematographer

- Born: March 17, 1927; Lille, France
- Died: November 8, 2008 (aged 81); Saint-Maurice, Switzerland
- Occupations: Cinematographer; Film director Film editor
- Years active: 1956–2002

Georges Dufaux (French pronunciation: [ʒɔʁʒ dyfo]; March 17, 1927 in Lille, France – November 8, 2008 in Switzerland) was a Canadian documentary film director and cinematographer.

== Biography ==
After graduating in 1953 from the École nationale de photographie et de cinématographie on the rue de Vaugirard, in Paris, Dufaux worked at a film laboratory in Brazil for three years. He came to Canada in 1956 and joined the NFB as an assistant cameraman, first working on the series Candid Eye. Dufaux eventually progressed to cinematographer and was responsible for the photography of many important Canadian films such as Les Brûlés (1959), Astataïon ou Le festin des morts (1965), YUL 871 (1966), Isabel (1968), Fortune and Men's Eyes (1971), Taureau (1973), Les beaux souvenirs (1981), and An Imaginary Tale (Une histoire inventée) (1990). He was also the cinematographer on several of Léa Pool's films.

Dufaux also worked as director on several short films throughout the 1960s and tried his hand unsuccessfully at a fiction feature film in 1967 with Clément Perron, C'est pas la faute à Jacques Cartier. He returned to documentary films and in the 1970s directed a number of important feature-length documentaries that approached social issues by exploring their impact on the people affected. Dufaux served as Director of the French Program at the NFB from 1986 to 1989 and in 1998 was awarded the Prix Albert-Tessier. He died in Switzerland on November 8, 2008.

== Major works as director ==
-L'homme multiplié (1969) (English: Multiple Man) A short, silent film about humanity on a global level produced originally in 70 mm with stereophonic sound. People of all places, origins, cultures, secular and religious, are here united and seen side by side. The film's title appears in seven languages.

-À votre santé (1974) (English: For Your Health) A film about the harsh reality of Canadian emergency rooms. Hospitals, dangerously understaffed, face a veritable invasion of patients. Inadequate technical resources make the task more difficult still.

-Au bout de mon âge (1975) (English: At the End of My Days) The film follows the slow and painful itinerary of an aged couple with diminishing capacities, both physical and mental, who are facing a complexity of problems by no means unique: they are not well enough to go into residence but are not ill enough to go into a nursing home.

-Les jardins d'hiver (1976) (English: Winter Gardens) Filmed in a nursing home funded by the government, the film documents the lives of the elderly who are placed there. Options to ensure senior citizens a more active lifestyle are discussed and reflected upon.

-Gui Daò - Sur la voie (1980) (English: Gui Daò - On the Way) A trilogy of films about contemporary Chinese society. Life on a passenger train, daily life in a busy train station, and railway employees unloading freight trains is interspersed which the intimate personal stories of a railway worker and her commitment to work and family life, a retiring train worker and his daughter who will reluctantly replace him, and an optimistic newly-wed couple contrasted with the tested marriage of a middle-aged couple.

-10 jours...48 heures (1986) (English: 10 Days...48 Hours) The film follows several trawlers after a six-month strike as they head out to the Grand Banks. The danger and tedium of life on a modern fishing boat is vividly captured as well as the processing plants and the families of the fisherman back on shore.

== Filmography ==
Short film

- Bientôt Noël (Co-Directed with Stanley Jackson, Wolf Koenig and Terence Macartney-Filgate, 1959)
- I Was a Ninety-pound Weakling (Co-Directed with Wolf Koenig, 1960)
- Les Dieux (Co-Directed with Jacques Godbout, 1961)
- 36,000 brasses (1962)
- L'école des peintres (Co-Directed with Jacques Godbout, 1962)
- Pour quelques arpents de neige (Co-Directed with Jacques Godbout, 1962)
- Rencontres à Mitzic (Co-Directed with Marcel Carrière, 1963)
- À propos d'une plage (1964)
- Caroline (Fiction Co-Directed with Clément Perron, 1964) (Re-Released as part of the 1964 anthology film Trois Femmes)
- Les départs necessaries (1965)
- Précision (1966)
- Cinéma et réalité (Co-Directed with Clément Perron, 1967)
- L'homme multiplié (Co-Directed with Claude Godbout, 1969)
- Deux ans et plus (Fiction Co-Directed with Gilles Thérien, 1970)
- À cris perdus (Co-Directed with Marc Beaudet, 1972)
- Nelli Kim (Co-Directed with Pierre Bernier, 1978)
- Les enfants des normes (Series of 8 shorts, 1979)
- Gui Daò - Sur la voie (Series of 3 shorts, 1980)
- Rue Ste-Catherine Est... to West (1992)
- Voyage illusoire (1997)
- De l'art et la manière chez Denys Arcand (2000)

Feature film

- It Isn't Jacques Cartier's Fault (C'est pas la faute à Jacques Cartier) (Co-Directed with Clément Perron, 1967)
- À votre santé (1974)
- Au bout de mon âge (1975)
- Les jardins d'hiver (1976)
- Games of the XXI Olympiad (Jeux de la XXIe olympiade) (Co-Directed with Jean Beaudin, Marcel Carrière and Jean-Claude Labrecque, 1977)
- Les enfants des normes - Post-Scriptum (1983)
- 10 jours... 48 heures (1986)
