= The Ivory Ape =

- Official release poster
- Genre: Action; Adventure; Drama; Romance
- Written by: Arthur Rankin Jr.; William Overgard
- Directed by: Tsugunobu Kotani
- Starring: Jack Palance; Steven Keats; Cindy Pickett; Celine Lomez
- Theme music composer: Bernard Hoffer; Maury Laws
- Country of origin: United States; Japan
- Original language: English

Production
- Executive producers: Arthur Rankin Jr.; Jules Bass
- Producer: Arthur Rankin Jr.
- Production location: Bermuda
- Cinematography: Yuzo Inagaki
- Editor: Wendy Wank
- Running time: 100 minutes (theatrical version); 96 minutes (TV version)
- Production companies: Tsuburaya Productions; Rankin/Bass Productions

Original release
- Network: ABC
- Release: April 18, 1980

The Ivory Ape is a 1980 Japanese-American action film co-produced by Rankin/Bass and Tsuburaya Productions. It was filmed in Bermuda, with a Japanese effects crew, and at Tsuburaya Studios in Tokyo.

It was first broadcast on ABC on April 18, 1980, and later released theatrically in Japan (the theatrical version running four additional minutes).

== Synopsis ==
Set in Bermuda, this movie focuses on a hunt for a rare albino gorilla, recently captured in Africa by ruthless big-game hunter Marc Kazarian (Jack Palance). Dedicated government agent Baxter Mapes (Steven Keats) and his ex-girlfriend, Lil Tyler (Cindy Pickett), conduct a humanitarian search for the ape, which has escaped from the greedy Kazarian. But hero and heroine are fighting against time as the villain has convinced the locals that the ape is a killer, and must be brought in dead or alive.

== Cast ==
- Jack Palance - Marc Kazarian
- Steven Keats - Baxter Mapes
- Cindy Pickett - Lil Tyler
- Celine Lomez - Valerie 'Val' Lamont
- Lou David - Roomie Pope
- Derek Patridge
- Earle Hyman
- Lou David
- Tricia Sembera
- William Horrigan
- David Man
