= The Apparition (1972 film) =

- French: L'Apparition
- Directed by: Roger Cardinal
- Written by: René Angélil; Pierre Labelle; Camil Adam
- Produced by: Roger Vallée
- Starring: René Angélil; Jean Coutu; Céline Lomez
- Cinematography: René Verzier
- Edited by: Pascale Laverrière
- Music by: Denis Forcier; Pierre Laurendeau; Pierre Noles
- Production companies: Briston Creative; Les Films Roger Vallée
- Distributed by: Les Films Mutuels
- Release date: March 17, 1972
- Running time: 119 minutes
- Country: Canada
- Language: French

The Apparition (French: L'Apparition) is a Canadian comedy film, directed by Roger Cardinal and released in 1972. A satire of the role of religion in Quebec society, the film centres on the media circus that engulfs a small Quebec town after a young girl claims to have had a vision of the Virgin Mary.

The film stars René Angélil as television reporter Jacques Cartier, alongside René Caron, Jean Coutu, Johnny Farago, Janine Fluet, Bertrand Gagnon, Jean Guilda, Guy L'Écuyer, Pierre Labelle, Céline Lomez, Katerine Mousseau and Claire Pimparé.

== Plot ==
The film focuses on the media circus that engulfs a small Quebec town after a young girl claims to have had a vision of the Virgin Mary.
