= Les Sultans =

Les Sultans was a French Canadian music band greatly affected by the British Invasion of sixties (The Beatles and the Rolling Stones), American folk-rock tradition and French yé-yé pop of the sixties. It was formed in Saint-Hyacinthe, Quebec in 1964 in and was a greatly successful band until its disbanding in 1968.

== Career ==
The origins of the band go back to 1962 when guitarist Claude Reid, a young musician greatly affected by British sounds established as an adolescent les Dots, an instrumental combo with Marcel Richard and shortly later André Dion and Gilles Henry and drummer Michel Dufault. In 1963, a vocalist Bruce Huard joined the formation giving it a great boost.

With increasing success, the band adopted more British sounds and changed its name to Les Sultans and in 1964 was signed to Fontaine record label as a new Quebec band to ride the Beatlemania bandwagon. Les Sultans original formation was vocalist Bruce Huard, guitar player Claude Reid and drummer Michel Dufault all from Les Dots days, in addition to Denis Forcier on guitars and Ghislain Dufault on bass.

Early 1964, the band became known for "Toujours devant moi" a remake of Beatles' "I Saw Her Standing There" and "Oh Lady" already made popular by Chats Sauvages and Spanish covers for "Cielito Lindo" and "La Bamba". In autumn 1964, les Sultans were chosen to succeed Les Hou-Lops, another Maskoutain group from the late 1950s, in the popular youth programme Bonsoir Copains on CHLT-TV in Sherbrooke. Managed by Jean-Guy Labelle and later Gerry Plamondon and lyricist Gilles Brown, Les Sultans became popular with songs like "Vivre sa vie" and "On est trop jeune" which made the group the youth generation spokesmen for Quebecers. The ballad "Va-t-en", composed by the group with its acoustic guitar and harmonies and elaborate vocals became a huge success. The follow-ups were French language covers of The Zombies hits in "Je t’aime bien" and "Dis-lui", with increasing charismatic popularity of Bruce Huard.

The band moved to a bigger label Télédisc, with Denis Pantis producing "Tu es impossible", a French version of Them's "I Can Only Give You Everything". Then came the band's biggest hit with a cover of Michel Polnareff's "La poupée qui fait non" considered the definitive song for Les Sultans. Other hits included "C'est promis", "Pardonne-moi", "Tout le monde me dit qu'elle est belle" and "Angélique". Their 1966 self-titled album Les Sultans broke all records of sale in Quebec, as they were chosen the Best Group of the Year during Festival du disque particularly with the launch of "L'amour s'en va", composed by band members Bruce Huard and Denis Forcier and the follow-up "Pour qui pourquoi".

In 1967, the repertoire of Les Sultans diversified with success of "À toi que je pense" and a series of English language songs composed by the duo Huard and Forcier like "To Say You're Sorry", "Bring Her Back" and "Looking Through You" to try to expand the fame of the band in the rest of Canada and internationally but with lesser success. These were included in a 1967 album Express. The band made a last tour in 1967 and early 1968 and a final album on Maison D.S.P. titled En personne - Les Sultans à Starovan - Leur spectacle d'adieu and a final single "En fermant la porte".

== After break-up ==
After break-up, singer Bruce Huard continued for a while as a pop singer before quitting music altogether. Other members were known to continue music careers. Guitarist Claude Reid studied under Alexandre Lagoya and became a music teacher and established a shop for repairing guitars. Denis Forcier joined the Aristos and Le Coeur d'une génération, and then as a solo artist and eventually composer of radio and television ads.

With the re-issues of the early 1990s, newly remastered versions along with one unreleased gem (Ça n'peut plus durer comme ça) see the light of day.

== Members ==
- Bruce Huard - vocals
- Ghislain Dufault - bass
- Denis Forcier - guitar
- Claude Reid - guitar, harmonica
- Michel Dufault - drums

Other members

- Pierre Bélanger - drums (1966–68) - replacing drummer Michel Dufault
- Roger Beaudet - guitar (summer 1965)

== Discography ==
Studio albums

- 1966: Les Sultans
- 1967: Express

Live albums

- 1968 En personne - Les Sultans à Starovan - Leur spectacle d'adieu

Compilations

- 1968: 15 Disques d'or
- 1991 Les sultans vol.1 (disques Mérite CD 22-902)
- 1992 Les Sultans vol 2 (disques Mérite CD 22-921)
- 2001: Les Sultans, volumes 1 and 2
- 2010: Top 30, Bruce et les Sultans
