= Claude Blanchard =

Canadian actor and singer (1932–2006)

Claude Blanchard (19 May 1932 – 20 August 2006) was a Québécois pop singer and actor.

== Biography ==
From his adolescence, Blanchard was interested in radio and theater. At age 14, he performed in variety shows with his sister Claudette.

In 1947, Blanchard began a dance duo called the Lucky Boys with Marcel Miron. They started their career at the Théâtre National. The duo quickly joined the burlesque tours of Jean Grimaldi's troupe. Blanchard remained part of Grimaldi's troupe for several years.

During a tour with Grimaldi's troupe, Blanchard met Armande Cyr, the former wife of comedian Réal Béland (Ti-Gus) and mother of future singer Pier Béland. Cyr was performing as a singer and actress, and the two fell in love. They decided to leave the troupe to perform together as the duo "Claude et Armande."

Blanchard later teamed up in the world of burlesque and Montreal cabarets with actors Paul Desmarteaux, Juliette Petrie, Olivier Guimond, Paul Thériault (who was his first straight man), and especially Léo Rivest, who was his stage partner for 25 years.

During the 1960s, Blanchard became a regular guest on the comedy television shows of Télé-Métropole: Alors raconte and Les Trois Cloches. At the end of the decade, on the same station, he co-hosted Madame est servie with Réal Giguère.

Ed Sullivan invited Blanchard to participate in his variety show, which was recorded on location at Man and His World as part of Expo 67.

In the early 1970s, Blanchard became the owner of the cabaret La Cravate Blanche in St-Sulpice, in the eastern suburbs of Montreal.

A prolific performer, Blanchard also hosted his own variety show from 1970 to 1974 on Télé-Métropole, where he created the character Nestor, l'enfant terrible. In the summer of 1980, Nestor returned to the stage and to records alongside Patof for several shows at Belmont Park.

Blanchard appeared in numerous television series (téléromans) throughout his career, including En haut de la pente douce (SRC, 1959–1961), La Montagne du Hollandais (TVA, 1992–1994), Montréal ville ouverte (SRC, 1991), Montréal P.Q. (SRC, 1991–1995), Omertà (SRC, 1996–1999), and Virginie (SRC, 1996–2005).

Blanchard had the background to play mafiosi (notably in the series Omertà), as he never hid his deep friendship with the Cotroni family. He was a childhood friend of Frank CotroniClaude Blanchard. Une vie d'artiste, p. 86 and also knew Vic Cotroni, with whom he co-managed the Montreal cabaret Casino Français in the mid-1950s.

The Cotronis are more than friends, they are my brothers

— he often repeated., "We were raised in the same environment," the actor recalled.

Blanchard was also involved in the controversy surrounding the participation of Jean-Pierre Ferland and Ginette Reno at the wedding of a member of the Hells Angels in August 2000. He served as an intermediary between a relative of the wedding party and Reno to convince her to sing at the ceremony.

During the 1980 Quebec referendum, on a project for sovereignty-association between Quebec and the rest of Canada, Blanchard was part of a minority of Quebec artists who joined the "Committee of Quebecers for the NO".

== Partial filmography ==
- Gina (1975) as Bob Sauvageau
- Mustang (1975)
- Fantastica (1980) as Hector
- Jesus of Montreal (1989) as policeman
- Rafales (1990) as Armand Pouliot
- Montreal Stories (1991) as Quesnel ("Toile du temps, La" segment)
- Nénette (1991)
- Omerta (1996-1999) as Roger Perreault
- Virginie (1996-2006) as Pierre Boivin
- Now or Never (Aujourd'hui ou jamais) (1998) as Napoleon
