= Fish Out of Water (2009 film) =

- Directed by: Ky Dickens
- Produced by: Ky Dickens; Katy Haggis; Kristen Kaza; Fawzia Mirza
- Music by: Kaki King
- Distributed by: First Run Features
- Release date: 18 July 2009 (Outfest)
- Running time: 60 minutes
- Country: United States
- Language: English
- Budget: $45,000

Fish Out of Water is a 2009 documentary film by director Ky Dickens. The film showcases the seven Bible verses that are most often used to condemn homosexuality and same-sex marriage. Dickens spoke with ministers on both sides of the debate surrounding homosexuality and the Bible for the film.

== Awards and recognition ==
- Centerpiece documentary - Reeling Lesbian and Gay International Film Festival for 2009
- Audience Choice runner-up - Wichita's Tall Grass Film Festival
- Jury Prize for Best Documentary - Show Me Social Justice Film Festival
- Best Festival Release with a Lesbian Character runner up - AfterEllen Visibility Awards
