= Patof =

Fictional Canadian television character

- Le cirque du Capitaine; Patofville; Patof raconte Patof voyage character
- Patof, the King of Clowns
- First appearance: January 1972
- Portrayed by: Jacques Desrosiers
- Alias: Gregor Patof
- Gender: Male
- Occupation: Clown
- Nationality: Russian

Patof is a character in the highly successful Canadian children's television series Patofville. He was portrayed by actor-comedian Jacques Desrosiers.

== Television, performances, and comics ==
In January 1972, the clown Patof made his appearance in the series Le Cirque du Capitaine on the French-language Quebec television station CFTM-TV Channel 10. He hosted three different series: Patofville, Patof raconte, and Patof voyage.

Patof told jokes and stories characterized by puns and often ended his numbers by exclaiming "On m'applaudit!!!" (applaud me!!!)

He had a successful recording career during the 1970s. Songs like "Patof Blou" (1972), "Patof le roi des clowns" (1972), "Patofville" (1973), "L'éléphant Tic-Tac" (1973), "La plus belle poupée du monde" (1973), "Bienvenue dans ma bottine" (1974), "Gros minou" (1975), and "Bonjour Patof" (1975) are among his greatest hits.

Patof participated in the Shriner Circus in 1973 and 1974, at the Montreal Forum.

He also recorded an English single called "The King of Clowns".

Some of Patof's adventures were released as recordings and comic strips, including Patof en Russie, Patof chez les esquimaux, Patof chez les coupeurs de têtes, Patof dans la baleine, Patof chez les petits hommes verts, Patof chez les cowboys, Patof raconte, Patof découvre un ovni, Patof en Chine, and Patof chez les dinosaures.

== Character background ==
The character's full name is Gregor Patof. According to his background story, he was born in Bobruisk, Belarus. Patof's father was a clown, and he and his wife both worked for a circus in Moscow. Patof lost his father at the age of six, and his mother died a few years later, reportedly from laughter after seeing a bearded woman.

As an orphan, Patof found employment at a circus. However, everything in that environment reminded him of his parents, so he made the decision to leave. Instead of choosing a drastically different climate, he moved to Montreal in Canada, a city as cold as Moscow.

Patof had the good fortune of meeting "Capitaine Bonhomme", who was always ready to help. Capitaine Bonhomme found him clowning work on television, where Patof quickly gained popularity among children. He also made numerous personal and unpaid appearances at hospitals and orphanages, winning the hearts of many.

In addition to being a clown, Patof is also the mayor of Patofville, an enchanting city filled with surprises for both young and old. He resides there with his friends Boulik, Polpon, and Itof.

== Characters ==
=== Patof ===
Gregor Patof is a Russian clown and the central character of Patofville, where he also serves as the mayor. He initially appears in the television series Le cirque du capitaine. His costume includes red pants and a tweed fitted coat with a collar and matching cuffs. He is known for wearing oversized red shoes called "tatanes". Within Patofville, he resides in a large yellow boot. Additionally, Gregor Patof holds the role of director in the Patof Circus.

=== Polpon ===
Mister Polpon is the police and fire brigade chief of Patofville. He is not only the best friend but also the confidant of Patof. Mr. Polpon resides in a spacious teapot that serves as both his residence and a prison, when necessary.

=== Itof ===
General Itof is a Russian spy with the mission of returning Patof to Moscow. He is not only an inventor, imitator, and practical joker, but also a skilled master of disguise. General Itof is often seen wearing a traditional Cossack costume and sports a remarkably versatile moustache that transforms as it pleases. Within Patofville, he resides in a spacious pumpkin.

=== Boulik ===
Boulik (full name: Boulik Scavanovitch) is Patof's loyal dog. He belongs to the renowned Toutousavanski breed and possesses the extraordinary ability to speak. Boulik becomes uncontrollable with excitement whenever he spots a cat.

=== Supporting characters ===
- Patof Circus members. Patof Circus consists of various talented individuals, among them Madam Sauratout, the fortune teller; the acrobatic troupe known as "Les Fabuleux Risquetout"; the towering giant Pandemur; the incredibly flexible man Sétir; the two dwarves, Fromage and Chocolat; the skilled animal tamer Mister Desfauves; the mahouts and elephant trainers "Pachy et Derme"; and the ringmaster Turira.
- Patof Circus animals. At Patof Circus also resides an array of animals, including the performing horses Macaron and Macaroni, the gorilla Bananof, and the elephant Tic-Tac.
- Gros'Tof, nicknamed "Masked Belly", is mentioned in the tale "Patof in Russia".
- Jim la varloppe is a character from the television series Chez le prof. Pierre. He accompanies Patof on stage during his early shows in 1972.
- Amikwan. In Patofville, the great chief Amikwan is always delighted to share his fantastic tales and Native American legends with children.
- Fafouin is a handyman and professional bungler. He works at the Patofville train station and seems to be Patof's scapegoat.
- Madeleine is an expert in design and DIY.
- Midas is Patof's mischievous talking duck; the two worked together at the Captain's Circus.
- Monsieur Qui is a scientist who seems a bit lost in the village of Patofville.
- Monsieur Tranquille, whose first name is Lesley, appears for the first time in the television series Patof Voyage. He is married to Farnande, a bingo champion, and has many children,
- Uncle Tom
- Tut-Tut

== Patof Blou ==
In September 2023, Vital Productions received financial support from SODEC for the development of the feature film Patof Blou. Screenwriters Sandrine Béchade and Julie Hétu were tasked with bringing Patof to life, following the success of the documentary film Mon oncle Patof. Filming is scheduled to begin in 2026.

== Filmography ==
=== Television series ===
- Le cirque du Capitaine (1972–1973)
- Patofville (1973–1976)
- Patof raconte (1975–1976)
- Patof voyage (1976–1977)

=== DVDs ===
- Bonjour Patof (2011)

== Discography ==
=== Albums ===
Year	Album	Label	Qc Chart	Notes
1972	Patof en Russie	Campus	N°5	
1972	Patof chez les esquimaux	Campus	—	
1972	Patof chez les coupeurs de têtes	Campus	—	
1972	Patof dans la baleine	Campus	Top 50	
1972	Patof chez les petits hommes verts	Campus	Top 50	
1972	Patof chez les cowboys	Campus	Top 50	
1973	Patof chante 10 chansons pour tous les enfants du monde	Campus	Top 50	
1973	Patofville – Patof chante pour toi	Campus	Top 50	
1974	Bienvenue dans ma bottine	Campus	Top 50	
1974	Itof et la ville souterraine	Campus	—	Itof album
1974	Polpon – Opération bonbon	Campus	—	Polpon album
1974	Amikwan – Koi koi ayaho	Campus	Top 50	Amikwan album
1974	L'histoire de Boulik	Campus	—	Boulik album
1975	Bricolons avec Madeleine	Campus	—	Madeleine album
1975	Patof Rock	Campus	—	
1975	Itof – Dans ma citrouille	Campus	—	Itof album
1975	Gilbert Chénier – Polpon	Campus	—	Polpon album
1975	Noël Noël Noël avec Patof	Campus	—	
1976	Gare... à Patof	Campus	—	
1976	Tut-Tut / Fafouin	Campus	—	Tut-Tut & Fafouin album
1976	Super Patof	Campus	—	
1980	Nestor et Patof – Pour tous	Girafe	Top 50	with Nestor

=== Singles ===
Year	Single	Label	Qc Chart	Notes
1972	"Patof Blou" (children's version) "Patof Blou" (political version)	Campus	N°1 —	
1972	"Patof le roi des clowns" "Ballade pour un clown (Dis Patof?)"	Campus	N°2 —	
1973	"The King of Clowns" "Dear Patof"	Polydor	— —	
1973	"Oh! Les enfants" "On m'applaudit"	Campus	N°14 —	
1973	"Patofville" "L'éléphant Tic-Tac"	Campus	N°15 —	
1973	"Bonjour les enfants" "La plus belle poupée du monde"	Campus	N°15 —	
1974	"Bienvenue dans ma bottine" "Goodbye, au revoir, dasvidanie!"	Campus	N°31 —	
1974	"Le roi des espions" "Je suis bon malgré tout"	Campus	— —	Itof single
1974	"Policier bonbon" "Prudence"	Campus	— —	Polpon single
1974	"Une vie de chien" "Je n'aime pas les chats"	Campus	— —	Boulik single
1975	"Gros minou" "Bonjour Patof"	Campus	— —	
1976	"Faut pas me chercher (Patof & Monsieur Tranquille)" "Mon ami Pierrot"	Jades	— —	
1980	"T'es pas sérieux" "On fait le tour de la terre"	Girafe	— —	with Nestor

=== Compilations ===
Year	Album	Label	Qc Chart	Notes
1974	Patof le roi des clowns	Pantin	Top 50	
1975	22 grands succès de Patof	Trans-World	—	
1976	Patofville – Patof et ses amis	TeeVee	—	
1977	20 grands succès de Patof, Fafouin, Itof	Télé-Métropole Inc.	—	

=== Collaborations and performances as guest star ===
Year	Album	Collaborator	Notes
2006	Nestor – Les grands succès	Claude Blanchard	Featuring the B-side of the album Nestor et Patof – Pour tous (Disques Mérite, compilation)

=== Charts ===
==== Meritas hit parade chart ====
On the Meritas chart, which was the most reliable chart list in Quebec in the early 1970s, Patof Blou reached number 1 for two weeks on 16 September 1972, and Patof le roi des clowns reached number 7 on 30 December 1972. Jacques Desrosiers received two Gold records for these two singles.

==== Reconstituted chart ====
===== Songs =====
Title / Date / Best rank / Weeks on chart

- 1972 "Patof Blou" / 1972-07-01 / #1 / 16 weeks on chart
- 1972 "Patof le roi des clowns" / 1972-10-21 / #2 / 22 weeks on chart
- 1973 "Oh! Les enfants" / 1973-04-07 / #14 / 5 weeks on chart
- 1973 "Patofville" / 1973-09-01 / #15 / 19 weeks on chart
- 1974 "Bonjour les enfants" / 1974-01-12 / #15 / 11 weeks on chart
- 1974 "Bienvenue dans ma bottine" / 1974-11-16 / #31 / 1 week on chart

===== Albums =====
Title / Date / Best rank / Weeks on Top 30

- 1972 Patof en Russie / 1972-09-23 / #5 / 7 weeks in Top 30
- 1972 Patof dans la baleine / 1972-12
- 1972 Patof chez les petits hommes verts / 1972-12
- 1972 Patof chez les cowboys / 1972-12
- 1973 Patof chante 10 chansons pour tous les enfants du monde / 1973-05
- 1974 Patofville – Patof chante pour toi / 1974-03
- 1974 Bienvenue dans ma bottine / 1974-12
- 1975 Patof le roi des clowns / 1975-04
- 1975 Amikwan – Koi koi ayaho / 1975-04
- 1980 Nestor et Patof – Pour tous / 1980-05

== Bibliography ==
- 1972 Patof raconte, Éditions de l'Homme
- 1972 Patofun, Éditions de l'Homme
- 1972 Cuisinons avec Patof, Éditions de l'Homme
- 1973 Patof découvre un ovni, Éditions Mirabel
- 1974 Patof en Chine, Éditions Mirabel
- 1976 Patof chez les dinosaures, Éditions Mirabel
- 2009 Une journée à Patofville, Éditions Les Intouchables (Non-canon)
- 2009 Patof à la rescousse de la forêt, Éditions Les Intouchables (Non-canon)
- 2009 Patof et le monstre du lac, Éditions Les Intouchables (Non-canon)
