= Celine Lomez =

Canadian actress and singer (born 1953)

Céline Lomez
- Born: Céline Léger; 11 May 1953 (age 72); Montreal, Quebec, Canada
- Occupation: Actress
- Spouse(s): Clarence Broeker, Jr. (m. 2000)

Céline Lomez (born 11 May 1953) is a Canadian actress and singer.

Lomez started her show business career singing French-Canadian pop songs with her sister Liette, and the two gained popularity after their performance at the Festival du Disque in Quebec in 1968. Liette went on to join a trio called Toulouse. Lomez, however, was soon offered a role in the Denis Héroux film Here and Now (L'Initiation, 1970). She was only 15 years old at the time.

She has also released two albums. One of her main hit songs was "L'amour dans les rangs de coton" (1974), a Louisiana zydeco-style ballad.

She went on to play Christopher Plummer's ill-fated girlfriend in the thriller The Silent Partner in 1978. She was originally set to star as Brooke Parsons in the 1983 horror film Curtains, but was replaced by actress Linda Thorson.

In 2004, Lomez published her autobiography, Pour quatorze dollars elles sont à vous?.

== Filmography ==
- Here and Now (L'Initiation) - 1970
- Loving and Laughing - 1971
- Sex in the Snow (Après-ski) - 1971
- The Apparition (L'Apparition) - 1972
- Réjeanne Padovani - 1973
- Don't Push It (Pousse mais pousse égal) - 1975
- Gina - 1975
- Stateline Motel - 1975
- The Far Shore - 1976
- The Silent Partner - 1978
- Plague - 1979
- The Spirit of Adventure: Night Flight (TV) - 1980
- The Ivory Ape (TV) - 1980
- It Can't Be Winter, We Haven't Had Summer Yet (Ça peut pas être l'hiver, on n'a même pas eu d'été) - 1980
- Spearfield's Daughter - 1986
- The Kiss - 1988
- Charlotte et Léa (TV) - 1995
- Sorry Charlie - 1996
- The Revenge of the Woman in Black (La vengeance de la femme en noir) - 1997
