= Anne Renée =

Canadian pop singer (born 1950)

- Born: Manon Kirouac; August 24, 1950 (age 75); Laval, Quebec, Canada
- Occupation: Singer
- Years active: 1964–1980
- Spouse: René Angélil (m. 1973; div. 1985)
- Children: 2

Anne Renée (born Manon Kirouac; August 24, 1950) is a Canadian pop singer who rose to fame in Quebec in the 1970s.

== Biography ==
Anne Renée was born in Laval, Quebec. In 1964, she released her debut song under her real name, Manon Kirouac. She had some success on discs and pursued her career in music until 1968, when she decided to complete her education. Later she started using her pop song name Anne Renee. Her friend, singer Johnny Farago, introduced her to producer Guy Cloutier, who took her under his wing. She became one of the most popular female singers in Quebec with hits like "Un amour d'adolescent" (a translation of a Paul Anka song) and "On trouve l'amour" (by the composer François Bernard of SOCAN). It was around this time that she fell in love with Cloutier's partner, René Angélil, whom she married in 1973, and with whom she had two children. Her musical career ended in 1979. She worked for two years as host and singer on the show Les Tannants, with Pierre Marcotte. She permanently left the art scene after that. In 1986, she divorced Angélil and moved to California.

== Discography ==
=== 45 rpm records ===
==== Under the name Manon Kirouac ====
- 1965 – Ding dong / Ta vallée lointaine
- 1966 – C'est le temps de l'école / Il y avait la lune
- 1966 – Je veux chanter / Danser le sloopy
- 1967 – L'école à gogo / Si vous connaissez quelque chose de pire qu'un vampire
- 1967 – Les filles / Mon cœur n'est pas à vendre
- 1968 – Le mariage / La première valse
- 1969 – Je suis ton amie / Une fille et un garçon (avec Gilles Rousseau)

==== Under the name Anne Renée ====
- 1970 – Le jonc d'amitié / Pas de mariage
- 1971 – Un jour, l'amour viendra / Toute petite
- 1971 – Qu'il est pénible d'aimer / Instrumental
- 1971 – Dis-moi, maman / Puisqu'il faut se quitter
- 1972 – Un amour d'adolescent / Toi et moi
- 1972 – Vacances d'été / L'été sur la plage (with Johnny Farago)
- 1972 – L'été est là / Copacabana (with Johnny Farago, Patrick Zabé, René Simard and Gilles Girard)
- 1972 – On trouve l'amour / Pancho (by SOCAN composer François Bernard)
- 1972 – Pour la première fois, Noël sera gris /Noël blanc
- 1973 – Symphonie d'amour / Pedro Gomez (by SOCAN composer François Bernard)
- 1973 – Symphonie d'amour / Instrumental
- 1973 – Quand j'étais une enfant / Tu ne sais pas ce qu'est l'amour
- 1973 – Ça nous fait pleurer / Aujourd'hui
- 1974 – Il est là, mon enfant / Sur le bord de ma tasse de café
- 1974 – Je veux savoir / Aujourd'hui
- 1974 – Une nuit dans tes bras / Aujourd'hui
- 1975 – Le docteur m'a dit / Toute petite
- 1975 – Un jeu d'fou / Sur le bord de ma tasse de café
- 1976 – Embrasse-le / Instrumental
- 1976 – Hasta Manana / Aujourd'hui
- 1977 – Une dose de rock'n roll / Aujourd'hui c'est ta fête
- 1977 – Tu remplis ma vie / Une dose de rock'n roll
- 1978 – Je ne sais pas / Instrumental

=== 33 rpm records on CD ===
- 1972 – Cadeau de Noël
- 1972 – Un amour d'adolescent
- 1973 – Quand j'étais une enfant
- 1980 – Anne Renée
- 2000 – Anne Renée: Un amour d'adolescent (compilation)
