= Steve Fiset =

Canadian singer-songwriter and actor

- Born: December 15, 1946 (age 79); Quebec City, Quebec, Canada
- Died: November 7, 2015 (aged 68); Montreal, Quebec, Canada
- Occupations: Singer-songwriter, Composer, Actor
- Notable work: "Les chemins d'été"

Steve Fiset (15 December 1946 – 7 November 2015) was a Québécois singer-songwriter, composer and actor.

== Biography ==
Steve Fiset was born in Quebec City, Quebec, Canada on 15 December 1946.

In 1965, Fiset founded the duo Jean et Steve with Jean Lévesque, which sang French and American folk songs and some of their own compositions while playing the guitar. They relocated to Montreal in 1966 and performed as the opening act at the Patriote for one year and a half. In early 1967, they won a trophy for the best band having performed in the Patriote during the year.

They recorded their first disc under Yvan Dufresne. Their song "C'est ainsi que va l'amour" won an award at the 1968 Festival du disque. On the same year, their song La banda was successful and they performed as the opening act for Èva's show at the Place des Arts.

In late 1968, Jean Lévesque left Québec to study theater in Paris, and Fiset went solo. He recorded some singles, of which "Chewy Chewey" was quite successful. He played in the soap opera Les Berger with the role of Jean-Claude from 1970 to 1973. His singing career reached its pinnacle in summer 1970 with the very successful song "Les chemins d'été" written by Luc Plamondon and André Gagnon. He collaborated with Plamondon on other songs such as "Les laurentides", "Le fou de tes nuits" and "Quand l'hiver" (Note: The latter of which was also made with Gagnon). He acted in the 1970 film Red.

In 1971, Fiset was named "male revelation of the year" at the Gala des artistes and participated in the tour Musicorama. He composed the soundtrack and had the main role in the movie Fleur bleue by Larry Kent. In autumn 1972, he hosted the variety show Studio libre. He published his last album in 1976, and in the same year participated in the music revue Tout chaud of François Guy, notably with Marjolène Morin. Fiset composed some songs for other artists, including Chantal Renaud. He retired from public life in 1979.

In 1993 Fiset had a stroke. He died at the Hôpital Maisonneuve-Rosemont in Montreal on 7 November 2015 from cardiac arrest.

== Discography ==
Singles
| Year | Title |
|---|---|
| 1967 | C’est ainsi que va l’amour / Loin |
| 1967 | Je joue la comédie / Ménaïk |
| 1968 | La banda / Chattanooga Choo Choo |
| 1968 | Sans jamais me retourner / Pablo |
| 1968 | C’est la fumée / Alice Long |
| 1969 | Chewy Chewy / Pourquoi faut-il se dire adieu |
| 1969 | Mes petits lapins / Tous les bateaux, tous les oiseaux |
| 1970 | Tout simplement / Rappelle-toi Seigneur |
| 1970 | Fleurs sauvages / Arizona |
| 1970 | Les chemins d’été / Le feu d’amour |
| 1970 | Le fou de tes nuits / Quand l’hiver est là |
| 1971 | Les Laurentides / Dans ma ville y’a deux villes |
| 1971 | Je suis ton ami / L’amour prend vie |
| 1972 | Je ne pense qu’à ça / Je revis |
| 1972 | Le temps de vivre / Ma chérie |
| 1973 | Énerve-toi pas / Tout comme un oiseau |
| 1973 | Pepsi Forever / La chasse aux alligators |
| 1974 | Blanc-Sablon / Les géraniums |
| 1974 | Allons danser, p’tit bébé / La mer des tranquillités |
| 1974 | Le télégramme / Bye Bye Love |
| 1975? | Reggae / Imagine le feeling |
| 1976 | Lili / Faut qu’ça paye |
| 1977 | Les femmes, les femmes / Comédie |
| 1978 | Les chemins d’été / Les Laurentides |
| 1979 | Tant qu’on est des amants / Le tour des bars |
| 1982 | Le graffiti / Pis toupie |

Albums
| Year | Title |
|---|---|
| 1970 | Steve Fiset |
| 1971 | Steve Fiset |
| 1972 | Steve Fiset |
| 1972 | Steve Fiset |
| 1973 | Dans ma ville |
| 1976 | Ange ou démon |

== Filmography ==
Actor
| Year | Title |
|---|---|
| 1970 | Red |
| 1971 | Fleur bleue |
