= Donald Lautrec =

Canadian actor and singer

- Born: Donald Bourgeois; July 13, 1940 (age 86); Jonquière, Quebec, Canada
- Occupations: Singer and actor
- Years active: 1957-2009

Donald Lautrec (born Donald Bourgeois, July 13, 1940, in Jonquière, Quebec) is a Canadian (Quebec) singer and actor.

== Career ==
With a friend in 1957, Lautrec created the acrobatic duo, Don and Lee, which performed on trampolines throughout Canada and the United States. He then mixed in the entertainment world by working as a lighting technician, a master of ceremonies in several Montreal cabarets and, for a short time, as a bodyguard to Québécois singer Michel Louvain. He then met impresario Yvan Dufresne, who had discovered Louvain, and asked him to help launch his own singing career. Dufresne accepted and, in 1961, booked Lautrec in the Hotel Central Saint-Martin in Laval, Quebec. That year Dufresne also arranged for Lautrec to record his first 45 rpm, Personne au monde (No One in the World).

In the following years, Lautrec became one of Quebec's top pop music stars. In 1964, he popularized the ska, a dance inspired by Jamaican ska with the songs C'est le Ska (That's Ska) and Manon, viens danser le ska (Manon, Come and Dance the Ska). In 1965 and 1966, he grew his success with Tu dis des bêtises (You're Talking Nonsense), Action and Loins dans ma campagne (Deep in My Countryside) which he sang in the movie Pas de vacances pour les idoles (No Holiday for Idols). In 1966 he travelled to France where he participated in television and radio, and received the Newcomer of the Year Award at the Gala des Artistes.

In 1967 Lautrec was selected to sing Expo 67's theme song Un jour, un jour (an English version was also recorded as Hey Friend, Say Friend), composed by Stéphane Venne. That summer his French interpretation of the Procol Harum song, A Whiter Shade of Pale—titled Le jour du dernier jour (The Day of the Final Day) -- reached hit status. In the fall, the Canadian Broadcasting Corporation (CBC) sent him to represent Canada at the Sopot International Song Festival in Sopot, Poland, where he won third prize for his rendition of La Manic, and at the International Festival of Popular Song in Rio de Janeiro, Brazil. In 1968, he toured France with internationally renowned Greek singer Nana Mouskouri.

In 1969, Lautrec definitively abandoned the yé-yé style with the release of songs like Eloise, Hallelujah (The Flowers of the Sun) and Hosanna, a French-language interpretation of Neil Diamond's Holly Holy. In 1969 and 1971, this success led to the CBC variety show Donald Lautrec Chaud (Donald Lautrec SHOW).

In 1972, Lautrec became one of the first recording artists to collaborate with Québécois lyricist Luc Plamondon. Their partnership led to recording the album Fluffy whose track list consists exclusively of Québécois compositions, including Plamondon's Le mur derrière la grange (The Wall Behind the Barn), which became a hit in Quebec. Singer-songwriter Claude Dubois also contributed to the album. Despite this success, sales of the LP were somewhat disappointing.

Lautrec's success diminished over the following several years and he seemed to gradually withdraw from the entertainment world - his original fan base did not like his new rock style, and rock fans preferred Québécois performers Robert Charlebois or the band Offenbach. But in 1980 he returned to the stage by participating in the retro show, Les 3 L (The 3 L's), with Michel Louvain and Peter Lalonde. In 1981, he released the album Lautrec and hosted Lautrec '81, one of Quebec's first television programs to feature video clips. He returned later with similar programming with Lautrec '82, Lautrec '83 and Lautrec '85.

In 1985, Donald Lautrec became the owner of the production company Riviera, which produces Quebec quiz shows such as Charivari, Action et Reaction and Double Jeopardy. He withdrew from the entertainment scene for about twenty years and unexpectedly returned in November 2009 with a new album of songs, Lautrec A Jamais, which was well received.

== Discography ==
- 2009 Lautrec A Jamais (Musicor)
- 2006 R & B (Compilation Discs Worth)
- 2006 The Hit (Compilation Discs Worth)
- 2006 Fluffy (reissue, Records Merit)
- 1985 Canada-Africa Foundation, Collective for Ethiopia: The Eyes Of Hunger (Kébec-Disc)
- 1981 Lautrec (Modulation)
- 1974 21 Hits (Disc Archive Québécois)
- 1972 Fluffy (Trans-World)
- 1971 Donald Lautrec 1960-1970 (Compilation Discs Neptune)
- 1971 Focus on Donald Lautrec (Trans-World)
- 1970 Lautrec 70 at the Canadian Comedy (Jupiter Records)
- 1969 Donald Lautrec, His Hot Successes (Ses succès chauds) (Jupiter Records)
- 1969 Donald Lautrec (Jupiter Records)
- 1968 Lautrec / Donald (Jupiter Records)
- 1966 Un jour, un jour, and Hey Friend, Say Friend, official Song for Expo '67
- 1966 Donald Lautrec (Jupiter Records)
- 1966 Donald (Jupiter Records)
- 1965 Discovery '65 (Jupiter Records)
- 1964 This Is Ska and Other Rhythms For Dancing (Apex)
- 1964 The Rhythm of Youth Today (Apex)
- 1963 Donald Lautrec (Apex)

== Filmography ==
- 1969: Je T'aimerai Toujours (Double Agent, TV Film)
- 1969: The Devil Loves Jewelry (Las Joyas Del Diablo)
- 1970: Two Women in Gold: Mr. Milk
- 1970: Damn ! (TV series)
- 1971: The Master Cats: Rosary Beausoleil
- 1974: The Apple, the Stem and the Seeds: Martial
- 1975: Gina: Pierre Saint-Louis
- 1983: Maria Chapdelaine: Lorenzo Surprenant
- 1989 to 1992: La roue chanceuse, Québec's version of Wheel of Fortune. (game show): animator

== Sources ==
- Encyclopedia of Popular Music in Quebec, Quebec Institute of Research on Culture, 1992.
- Quebecinfomusic.com (Website).
