= The Apple, the Stem and the Seeds =

1974 film by Claude Fournier

- French: La pomme, la queue et les pépins
- Directed by: Claude Fournier
- Written by: Claude Fournier; Marie-José Raymond
- Produced by: Marie-José Raymond
- Starring: Donald Lautrec; Han Masson
- Cinematography: Claude Fournier
- Edited by: Claude Fournier
- Production companies: Cinépix; Les Productions Mutuelles; Rose Films
- Distributed by: Les Films Mutuels
- Release date: September 20, 1974
- Running time: 88 minutes
- Country: Canada
- Language: French
- Budget: $150,000

The Apple, the Stem and the Seeds (French: La pomme, la queue et les pépins) is a Canadian sex comedy film, directed by Claude Fournier and released in 1974. The film stars Donald Lautrec as Martial Roy, a former playboy who suddenly finds himself dealing with erectile dysfunction after falling in love with and marrying Louise Letarte (Han Masson), leading them both on a journey of trying out various cures and solutions.

The cast also includes Roméo Pérusse, Janine Sutto, Réal Béland, Thérèse Morange, Jean Lapointe, Danielle Ouimet, Louise Turcot and Denis Drouin.
