= Robert Demontigny =

Canadian musician (1936–2024)

- Born: March 17, 1936; Verdun, Quebec, Canada
- Died: January 27, 2024 (aged 87); Saint-Lambert, Quebec, Canada
- Occupations: Singer, Actor, Producer, Television host

Robert Demontigny (17 March 1936 – 27 January 2024) was a Canadian singer, actor, producer and television host from Quebec.

== Biography ==
Joseph Arthur Roméo Patrick Robert Demontigny was born on 17 March 1936 in Verdun, Quebec, Canada to Roméo Demontigny, a postman. He was baptized on 21 March of the same year.

Robert Demontigny won first prize at the competition show Ma première chance, thus hosting the show Rolande reçoit with Rolande Désormeaux for a few weeks. In 1962, he toured the cabarets of Quebec. He became popular thanks to the song "Eso Beso". Other hits followed: "Danke schoen", "Rien n'est impossible" and "Un baiser de toi", all French adaptations of English songs.

In summer 1963 and summer 1964, he hosted the show Copain-Copain with Dominique Michel and in summer 1965 replaced Pierre Lalonde as host of Jeunesse d'aujourd'hui. In 1965, he founded the label Télédisc with Denis Pantis. He participated to the revue Zéro de conduite presented at the Place des Arts and in Hangar 54, a musical by Paul de Margerie shown on television in 1967. He hosted the variety show Let's Go in 1967-1968.

Thanks to his success in English Canada, he won a trophy at the Gala des artistes in 1968. He also published the songs "Vin d'été" and "Les bicyclettes de Belsize" around this time, which were successful on disc.

In 1972, he founded the label Maisonneuve and became producer for André Fontaine, Guy Aubin and Jacques Boulanger. On this label, he recorded the song "Si tu m'attends, évidemment", one of his greatest success.

He ceased releasing records in 1977 and ended his career in 1982.

He died on 27 January 2024 at Saint-Lambert. He was known for his sweet and romantic voice.

== Discography ==
Singles
Year	Title
1961	Si tu veux / Et moi aussi
1962	Et moi aussi / Je perds la tête
1962	Eso beso / Jacqueline
1963	Danke schoen / Les vacances sont finies
1963	Rien n’est impossible / Pour toi
1964	Prends tes clés / Tu dis oui
1964	Eso beso / Mon ange gardien
1965	Un baiser de toi / Dans tes bras
1965	Aujourd’hui c’est congé / Un je ne sais quoi
1965	Je ne serais plus rien / Do ré mi
1965	Les joies de l’été / Par une nuit d’été
1966	Danse, danse avec moi / Pense un peu à moi
1966	Es-tu sincère / En ce temps-là
1966	Le secret du bonheur / La bamba
1966	Guantanamera / Où êtes-vous
1967	Perfidia / Embrasse-moi
1967	Vin d’été / Chanson sur une note
1967	Avez-vous déjà rêvé / Un autographe S.V.P.
1967	Jackson / Ferme tes yeux
1967	Oublions ce monde / Dis-moi pourquoi
1967	La bamba / Pense un peu à moi
1968	Amor / Ce soir, je veux t’aimer
1968	Ce soir, je veux t’aimer / Comment te dire
1968	Les bicyclettes de Belsize / Des nuits blanches sans toi
1969	J’aime que tu m’aimes / La fille que j’aimais
1969	Oh Marie, reviens-moi / Night Is Wight
1970	Prends la vie comme elle vient / Ma chérie d’amour
1970	You Find Out Tomorrow / Love Is A Special Way Of Feeling
1970	Tout est beau et merveilleux / Notre amour vivra toujours
1971	L’heure du départ / Au creux de tes bras
1972	Bonjour l’aurore
1972	Si tu m’attends, évidemment / Bonjour l’aurore
1972	Le petit train bleu / J’ai vu maman embrasser le Père Noël
1973	Claire / Lise
1973	On part avec toi / Pour de l’or
1974	Dis-moi donc comme t’as un beau casque / Instrumental
1974	L’homme en blanc
1974	L’amour est différent / Instrumental
1974	La première fois / Instrumental
1974	La première fois / L’amour est différent
1975	Je suis un mari fidèle / Instrumental
1975	Chantez-moi cette chanson / L’amour est différent
1977	Moins que rien / Instrumental
1977	Une question de temps / Bonjour
1978	Eso beso / Pense un peu à moi
1978	Un baiser de toi / Comment te dire
1978	Si tu m’attends, évidemment / Vin d’été
1978	Je suis un mari fidèle / Claire
1978	On part avec toi / Bonjour l’aurore

Albums
Year	Title
1962	Concours Chansons sur mesure 1962
1963	Robert Demontigny
1963	Un p’tit bout de femme
1964	Un baiser de toi
1965	Noël chez...
1965	15 succès
1967	Par une nuit d’été
1968	Robert Demontigny latin
1968	15 disques d’or
1970	L’histoire de Robert Demontigny
1973	Si tu m'attends évidemment
1973	Noël avec les Demontigny
1974	Toute ma carrière

== Filmography ==
Actor
Year	Title
1971	Après-ski
1971	Pile ou face
