= César et les Romains =

- Years active: 1965–1968
- Members: Jacques Moisan (drummer) (1965–1968, 2015–); Donald Seward (organist) (1965–1968, 2015–); Ric Lozier (guitarist) (2015–); Rémi Perron (bassist) (2015–); Guy Lamarche (vocalist) (2015–)
- Past members: Maurice Bélanger (bass guitarist) (1965–1966); Daniel Lachance (guitarist) (1965–1968); Dino L'Espérance (singer) (1965–1968); Pierre Sidor (1966–1968)

César et les Romains was a Québécois yé-yé band active from 1965 to 1968. It reformed in 2015 and is still active.

== History ==
The group started making dance music in hotels under the name Les Questions. In spring 1965, the band changed its name to César et les Romains, with its members now wearing togas, skirts and sandals like Roman centurions. They were managed by Dominique Mandanice.

César et les Romains had their first public appearance at the Café de l'Est, then published the successful songs "Splish splash" and "Toi et moi". They performed at cabarets; mostly anglophone songs, often in a rhythm'n blues style. They also performed classics of the French and international repertoire.

The group was known across Quebec, appearing on television, touring in the province and participating in the 1966 tour Musicorama. It was named the "most spectacular band" at the Gala des artistes in 1966. In 1966, Maurice Bélanger was replaced by Pierre Sidor.

The group members abandoned their Roman clothing in spring 1967, burning them in front of journalists. They turned to more serious material. They attempted to have a breakthrough in the United States, participating in the Expo 67 promotional show at Central Park, New York and in early 1968 performing at hotels in Puerto Rico, Florida and the Bahamas.

The group had its last successes with "Money", "Dalila" and "Je veux vivre", and then dissolved in late 1968.

Dino L'Espérance continued with his band César et compagnie for a short period, while the rest of the band continued for a few months under the name 4 Romains.

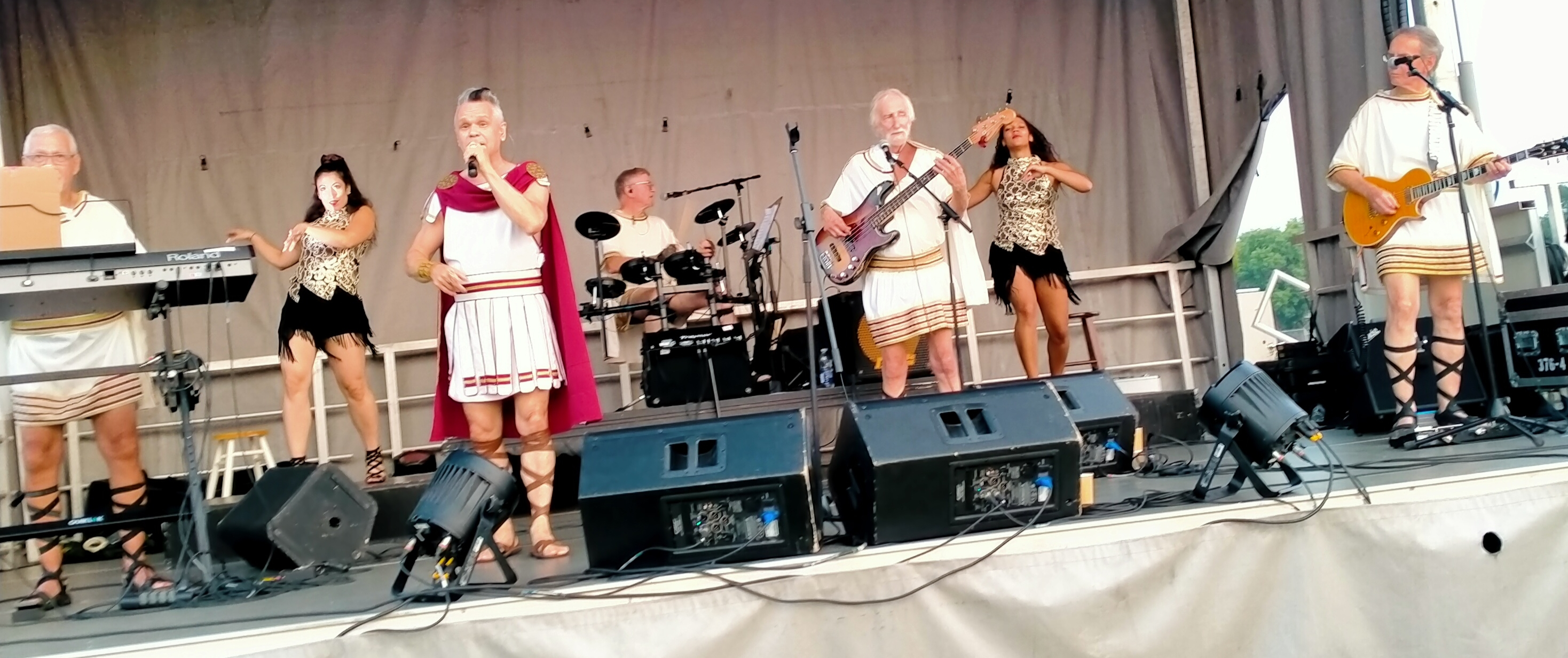

The members reunited in 1976 for Le retour des groupes. They group made a comeback in 2015, composed of Donald Seward (keyboardist) and Jacques Moisan (drums), joined by Ric Lozier (guitarist, formerly in Les Checkmates), Rémi Perron (bassist, from the band Abbittibbi) and Guy Lamarche (vocalist). They performed their songs at the Festival Rétro de Joly and other venues in 2015. They wore their costume. They are still active as of 2024.

== Discography ==
Singles
Year	Title
1965	Qui est-elle/J’ai oublié de prier
1965	Laisse-moi partir/Je crois rêver mais c’est vrai
1965	Splish Splash/Alors c’était lui
1965	Toi et moi/Pour toi
1965	Je sais
1966	C’est la fin/Tu dis non
1966	Trop seul sans toi/M’en aller
1966	Trop seul sans toi/Que faut-il faire pour oublier
1966	J’ai tant d’amour/Fini entre nous
1967	J’ai oublié de prier/Tout ce qu’elle voulait
1967	Par amour, par pitié/Toi, toi, toi
1967	Le jour du dernier jour/Laisse-moi partir
1967	L’enfant au tambour/Noël blanc
1968	Money/Dans ton miroir
1968	Dalila/Ooh la la
1968	Il est jaloux/Je veux vivre
1969	Fini entre nous/J’ai tant d’amour/Par amour, par pitié/Toi, toi, toi
1969	J’ai oublié de prier/Ce qu’elle voulait/C’est la fin/Tu dis non
1969	Le jour du dernier jour/Laisse-moi partir/Que faut-il faire pour oublier/Je t’aime trop
1969	Dalila/Money/Ooh la la/Dans ton miroir
1969	Je veux vivre/Splish Splash/Toi et moi/Je sais
1969	Marche comme un homme/Mon meilleur copain
1969	Tu n’as plus besoin de moi/Le bout de la rue
1969	Quinze enfants/Sur ma moto
1970	Je veux rentrer chez moi/Méfiez-vous des femmes
1971	Mammy Blue/Money
1972	Je n’ai pas vu l’Espagne/Il est jaloux
1972?	Comme ça s’rabon/Trois nuits
197?	Seul/La légende de Johnny
1974	Toi et moi/Alors c’était lui
1974	Dalila/Mammy Blue
1974	Splish Splash/Pour toi
1974	C’est la fin/Je sais
1974	Laisse-moi partir/Tout ce qu’elle voulait
1974	Toi, toi, toi/Le jour du dernier jour
1976	Je ne suis plus rien sans toi/It's Only Make-Believe
1976	Au fil du temps/
1982	La chanson du pina colada/Instrumental
1983	Une fois dans la vie suffit/Si tu m’aimais

Albums
Year	Title
1965	César et les Romains
1966	César et les Romains: XII x V
1966	César et les Romains chantent pour les jeunes
1967	Le jour du dernier jour
1968	Dalila
1968	Le disque d’or, volume 1
1968	César et les Romains: 1964–1968
1969	César et les Romains
1969	Splish Splash
1969	Donald Seward joue les Beatles
1970	Donald Seward à l'orgue
1971	César et les Romains
1974	21 disques d’or
1978	Rock & Roll
1991	César et les Romains, volume I
1992	César et les Romains
