= Culture of Quebec =

Culture of Canada's Quebec province

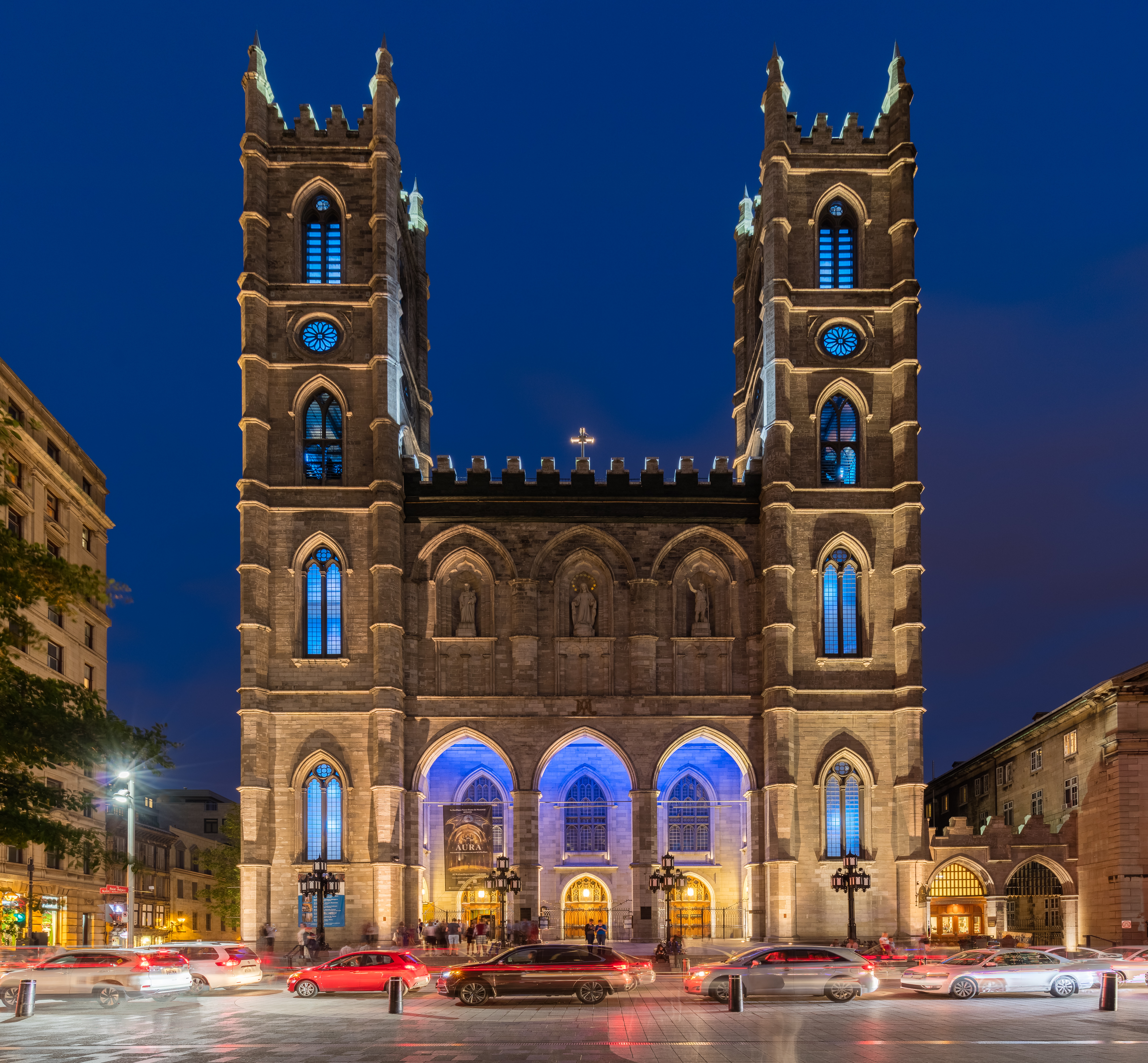
Notre-Dame Basilica, Montreal

The culture of Quebec emerged over the last few hundred years, resulting predominantly from the shared history of the French-speaking North American majority in Quebec. Québécois culture, as a whole, constitutes all distinctive traits – spiritual, material, intellectual and affective – that characterize Québécois society. This term encompasses the arts, literature, institutions and traditions created by Québécois, as well as the collective beliefs, values and lifestyle of Québécois. It is a culture of the Western World.

Quebec is the only region in North America with a French-speaking majority, as well as one of only two provinces in Canada where French is a constitutionally recognized official language. As of 2006, 79% of all Quebecers list French as their mother tongue; since French is the official language in the province, up to 95% of all residents speak French. The 2001 census showed the population to be 90.3 percent Christian (in contrast to 77 percent for the whole country) with 83.4 percent Catholic (including 83.2 percent Roman Catholic).

History made Quebec a place where people can experience North America, but from the point of view of a linguistic minority surrounded by a larger English-speaking culture. This enclaved status has pushed many in Quebec to favour cultural protectionism, which can be seen in efforts such as the adoption of laws like of the Charter of the French Language and the creation of government institutions like the Office québécois de la langue française. The Encyclopædia Britannica describes contemporary Quebec political culture as a post-1960s phenomenon resulting from the Quiet Revolution, an essentially homogeneous socially liberal counter-culture phenomenon supported and financed by both of Quebec's major political parties, who differ essentially not in a right-vs-left continuum but a federalist-vs-sovereignty/separatist continuum. The Quiet Revolution also turned Quebec from the most religious province into the most secular.

Quebec has been strongly influenced by Early modern France as it was part of New France. Interactions with France today can also be impactful. The province has been strongly influenced by British culture as a result of the Conquest of New France and subsequent centuries spent as part of the British Empire and under the British monarchy. Quebec has received a Celtic influence because of past immigrants from Ireland and Scotland. English-speaking Canadians (called "Anglais" or "Anglo") of other provinces, especially of nearby provinces like Ontario, as well as those inside Quebec, continue to influence Québécois today. Quebec is strongly influenced by American culture because of geographical and affective proximity. For historical and linguistic reasons, Quebec has cultural links with other North American French-speaking communities, particularly with the Acadians and Franco-Ontarian communities in Eastern Ontario and Northern Ontario. Quebec also has links—though weaker ones—to francophone communities in Western Canada, the Cajun French revival movements in Louisiana, Haiti and the French Antilles. Influences from First Nations are reflected in Québécois activities including snowshoeing and maple syrup production.

== Heritage ==
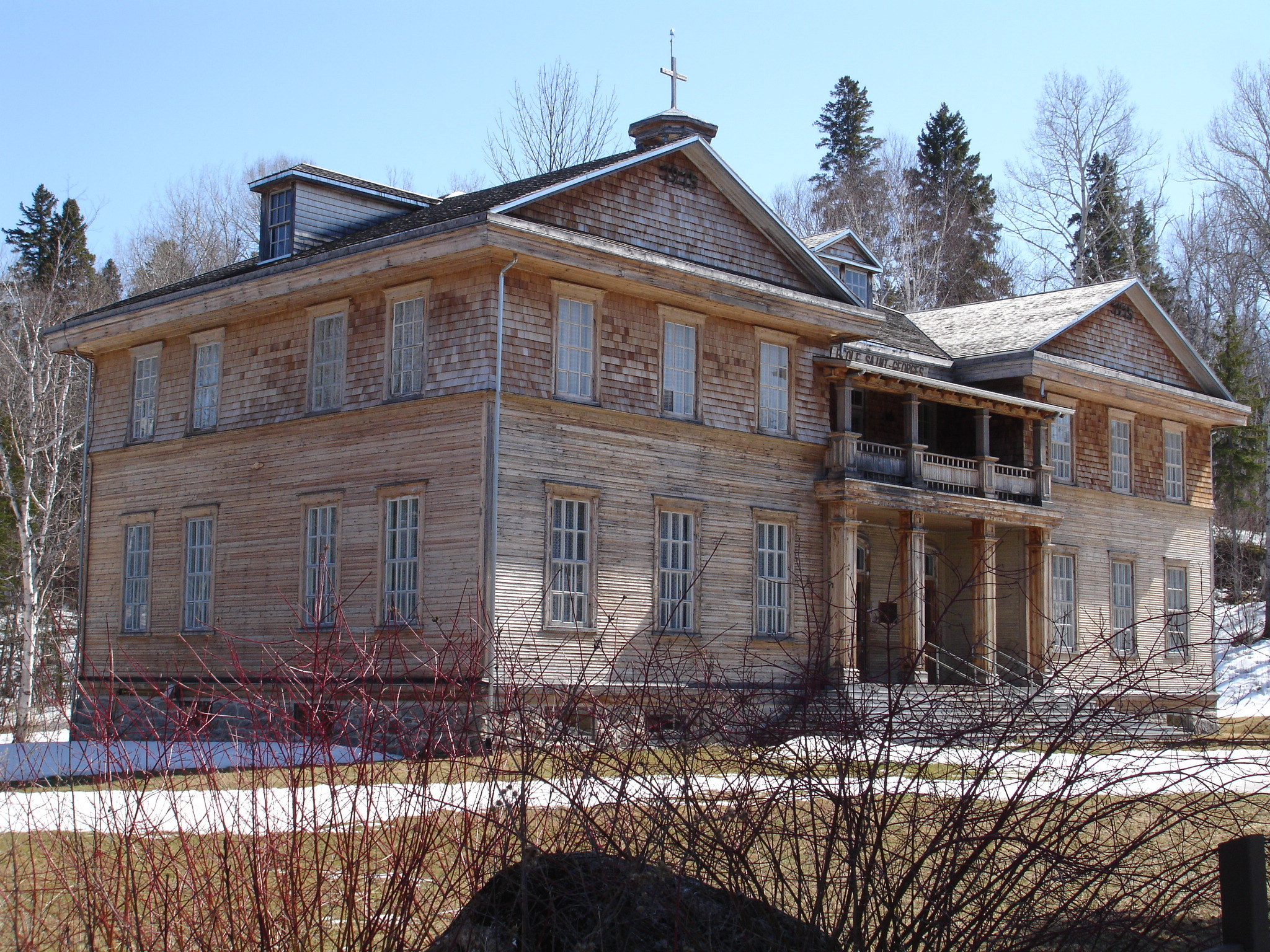
The school and the convent of the Congregation of Our Lady of Good Council, the ghost town of Val-Jalbert, Saguenay-Lac-Saint-Jean

The Cultural Heritage Fund is a program of the Quebec government for the conservation and development of Quebec's heritage, together with various laws. Several organizations ensure that same mission, both in the social and cultural traditions in the countryside and heritage buildings, including the Commission des biens culturels du Québec, the Quebec Heritage Foundation, the Conservation Centre of Quebec, the Centre for development of living heritage, the Quebec Council of living heritage, the Quebec Association of heritage interpretation, etc.

Several sites, houses and historical works reflect the cultural heritage of Quebec, such as the Village Québécois d'Antan, the historical village of Val-Jalbert, the Fort Chambly, the national home of the Patriots, the Chicoutimi pulp mill (Pulperie de Chicoutimi), the Lachine Canal and the Victoria Bridge. Strongly influenced by the presence of the Catholic Church, the development of the religious history of Quebec is provided by organizations like the Council of the religious heritage of Quebec. Since 2007, the government promotes, with the various players in the field, the conclusion of agreements on the use of property belonging to episcopal factories and corporations to establish "partnerships in financing the restoration and renovation of religious buildings."

As of December 2011, there are 190 National Historic Sites of Canada in Quebec. These sites were designated as being of national historic significance.

Various museums tell the cultural history of Quebec, like the Museum of Civilization, the Museum of French America, the McCord Museum or the Montreal Museum of Archaeology and History in Pointe-à-Callière, displaying artifacts, paintings and other remains from the past of Quebec. Many literary works reproduce the daily lives of the past, following the social and cultural traditions of Quebec television series reproducing the old days such as the trilogy of Pierre Gauvreau (Le Temps d'une paix, Cormoran and Le Volcan tranquille), La Famille Plouffe, Les Belles Histoires des Pays-d'en-Haut, La Petite Patrie, Entre chien et loup, Les Filles de Caleb, Blanche, Au nom du père et du fils, Marguerite Volant, Nos Étés or Musée Éden, among others.

== Folklore ==
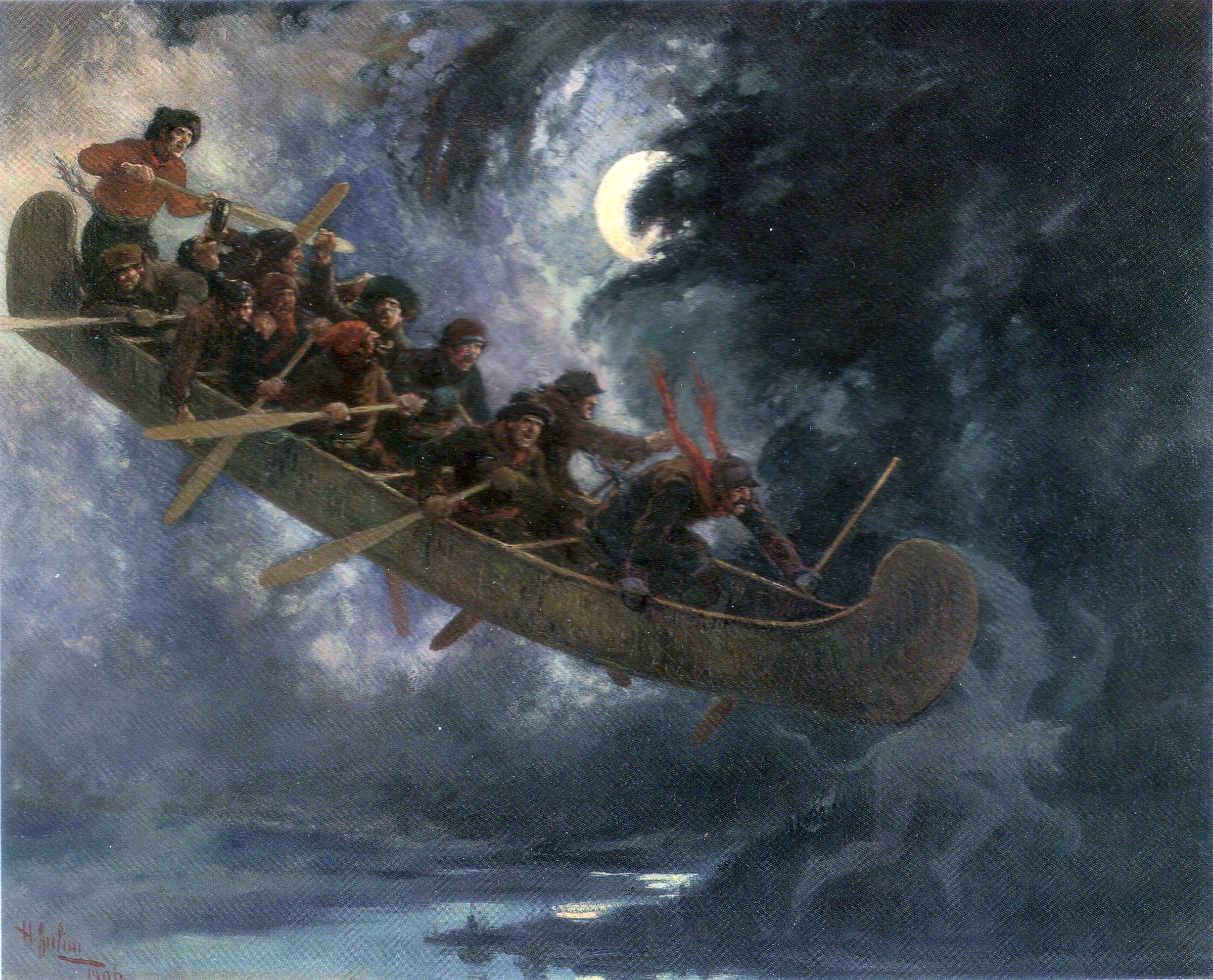
La chasse-galerie (1906) by Henri Julien, showing a scene from a popular Quebec folk legend.

In terms of folklore, Quebec's French-speaking populace has the second largest body of folktales in Canada (the first being Native people); most prominent within Quebec folklore are old parables and tales. Other forms of folklore include superstitions associated with objects, events, and dreams. The Association Quebecoise des Loisirs Folkloriques is an organization committed to preserving and disseminating Quebec's folklore heritage. It produces a number of publications and recordings, as well as sponsoring other activities.

When the early settlers arrived from France in the 17th century, they brought with them popular tales from their homeland. Adapted to fit the traditions of rural Quebec by transforming the European hero into Ti-Jean, a generic rural habitant, they eventually spawned many other tales. Many were passed on through generations by what French speaking Québécois refer to as Les Raconteurs, or storytellers. Almost all of the stories native to Quebec were influenced by Christian dogma and superstitions. The Devil, for instance, appears often as either a person, an animal or monster, or indirectly through Demonic acts.

Various tales and stories are told through oral tradition, such as, among many more, the legends of the Bogeyman, the Chasse-galerie, the Black Horse of Trois-Pistoles, the Complainte de Cadieux, the Corriveau, the dancing devil of Saint-Ambroise, the Giant Beaupré, the monsters of the lakes Pohénégamook and Memphremagog, of Quebec Bridge (called the Devil's Bridge), the Rocher Percé and of Rose Latulipe, for example.

== Creative arts ==
=== Cinema ===
The Cinémathèque québécoise has a mandate to promote the film and television heritage of Quebec. The National Film Board of Canada (NFB), a federal Crown corporation, provides for the same mission in Canada. The Association of Film and Television in Quebec (APFTQ) promotes independent production in film and television. Several movie theatres across Quebec ensure the dissemination of Quebec cinema. With its cinematic installations, such as the Cité du cinéma and Mel's studios, the city of Montreal is home to the filming of various productions.

The first public movie projection in North America occurred in Montreal on June 27, 1896. Frenchman Louis Minier presented a film on a Cinematograph in a Café-Theatre on Saint Lawrence Boulevard. However, it was not until the 1960s when the National Film Board of Canada was established that a genuine Quebec cinema industry would emerge. The 1970s were a "watershed" moment for Quebec films, when sophisticated themes and techniques were used by filmmakers such as Claude Jutra. Jutra's Mon Oncle Antoine (1971) has been assessed by some film critics as "one of Canada's greatest films".

Denys Arcand found success in the 1980s with The Decline of the American Empire (1986) and Jesus of Montreal (1989). In 2004, an Arcand film, The Barbarian Invasions, won the Academy Award for Best Foreign Language Film. Jean-Claude Lauzon's films, such as Night Zoo (Un zoo la nuit) (1987) and Léolo (1992), gained traction with audiences and critics alike.

C.R.A.Z.Y. (2005) by Jean-Marc Vallée was successful at home and abroad. Xavier Dolan attracted audience and critical attention with I Killed My Mother (2009) and subsequent films. Quebec films have gained recognition through multiple nominations for the Academy Award for Best Foreign Language Film in recent years; Incendies (2010) by Denis Villeneuve, Monsieur Lazhar (2011) by Philippe Falardeau, and War Witch (2012) by Kim Nguyen.

Important contributions to world cinema include Cinéma vérité and artistic animation.

=== Circus arts ===
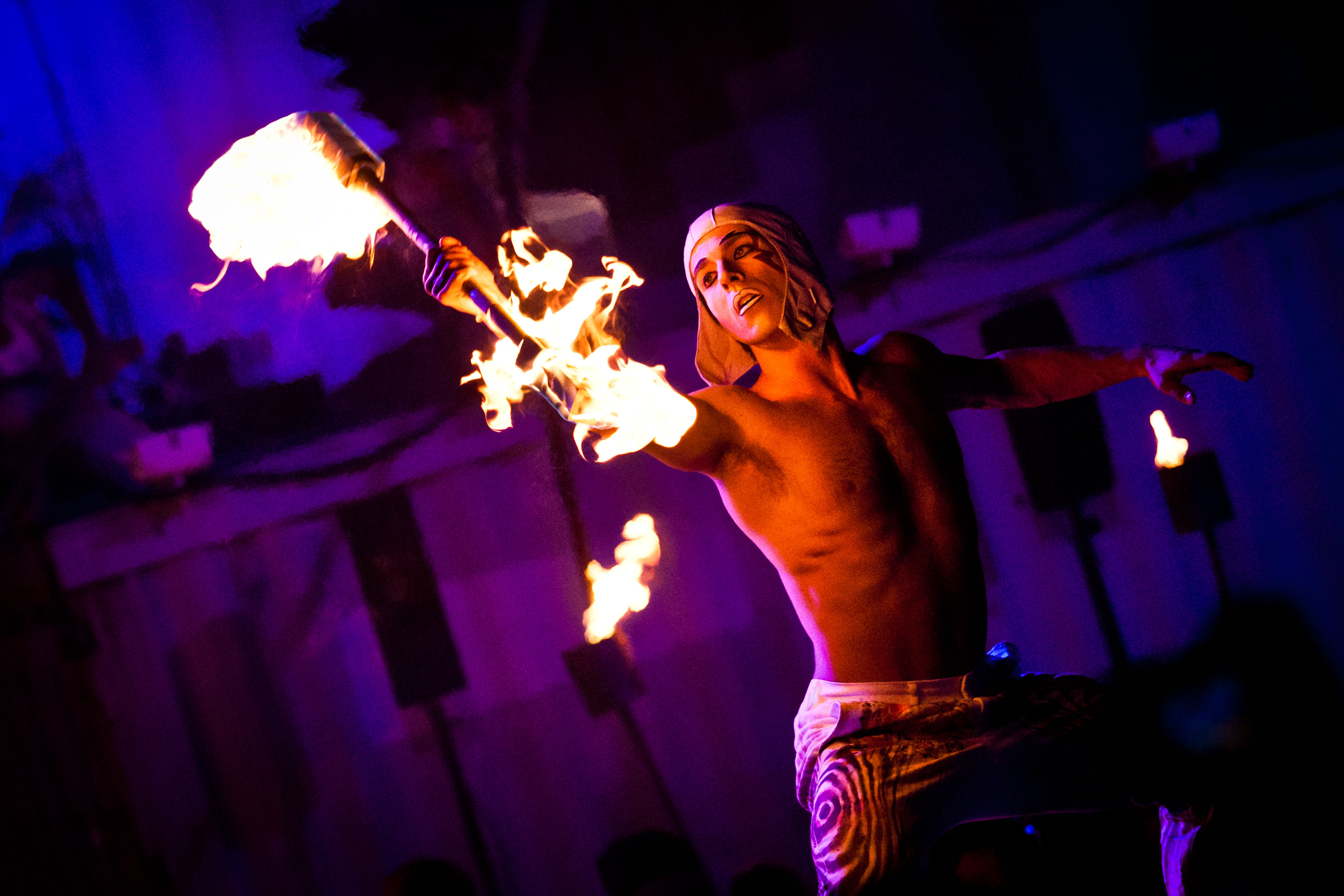
An outdoor performance by Cirque du Soleil in Quebec City.

Quebec has carved a niche for itself in the field of circus arts, where it emphasizes the European tradition of circus.

Several circus troupes were created in recent decades, most notably the Cirque du Soleil. Its productions include Varekai, Dralion, Alegría, Corteo, KOOZA, Quidam, Kà, Zumanity, Love, Mystère and O (which is performed on a water platform).

It is one of the world's few circuses without animal performers. Other internationally successful troupes include Cirque Éloize and Cirque ÉOS. Presented outdoors under a tent or in venues similar to the Montreal Casino, the circuses attract large crowds both in Quebec and abroad. In the manner of touring companies of the Renaissance, the clowns, street performers, minstrels, or troubadours travel from city to city to play their comedies. Although they may appear randomly from time to time during the year, they are always visible in the cultural events such as the Winterlude in Gatineau, the Quebec Winter Carnival, the Gatineau Hot Air Balloon Festival, the Quebec City Summer Festival, the Just for Laughs Festival in Montreal and the Festival of New France in Quebec. The National Circus School and the École de cirque de Québec were created to train future Contemporary circus artists. For its part, Tohu, la Cité des Arts du Cirque was founded in 2004 to disseminate the circus arts.

Cavalia, a Shawinigan-based horse show, has, since 2003, gained massive popularity in Montreal and Los Angeles. It features both acrobatic and equestrian arts. All of the horses are male, most of which are stallions.

=== Comic strips ===
Comic books in Quebec traditionally follow the European tradition of comics, combining both graphic design and literature. Though most are aimed at children, they are generally considered more dignified entertainment and there are many notable exceptions of graphic novels and comic books aimed at an older reading audience, such as the ones published by the Montreal-based Drawn & Quarterly, Les 400 coups, and La Pastèque.

=== Dance ===
Traditional music is imbued with many dances, such as the jig, the quadrille, the reel and line dancing. Classical dance in Quebec took root after World War II. Les Ballets Quebec (1948–51) was a short-lived ballet corps founded by Gérald Crevier. Les Grands Ballets Canadiens was founded in 1959, and gained an international reputation.

Le Groupe de la Place Royale (1966) was the first modern dance company in Quebec, eventually moving to Ottawa in 1977. Le Groupe Nouvelle Aire (1968–1982) was the second modern dance company, also established in Montreal. During the 1980s, modern dance groups La La La Human Steps and O Vertigo became internally known. Choreographer Margie Gillis has established a successful career across Canada and internationally.

=== Comedy ===
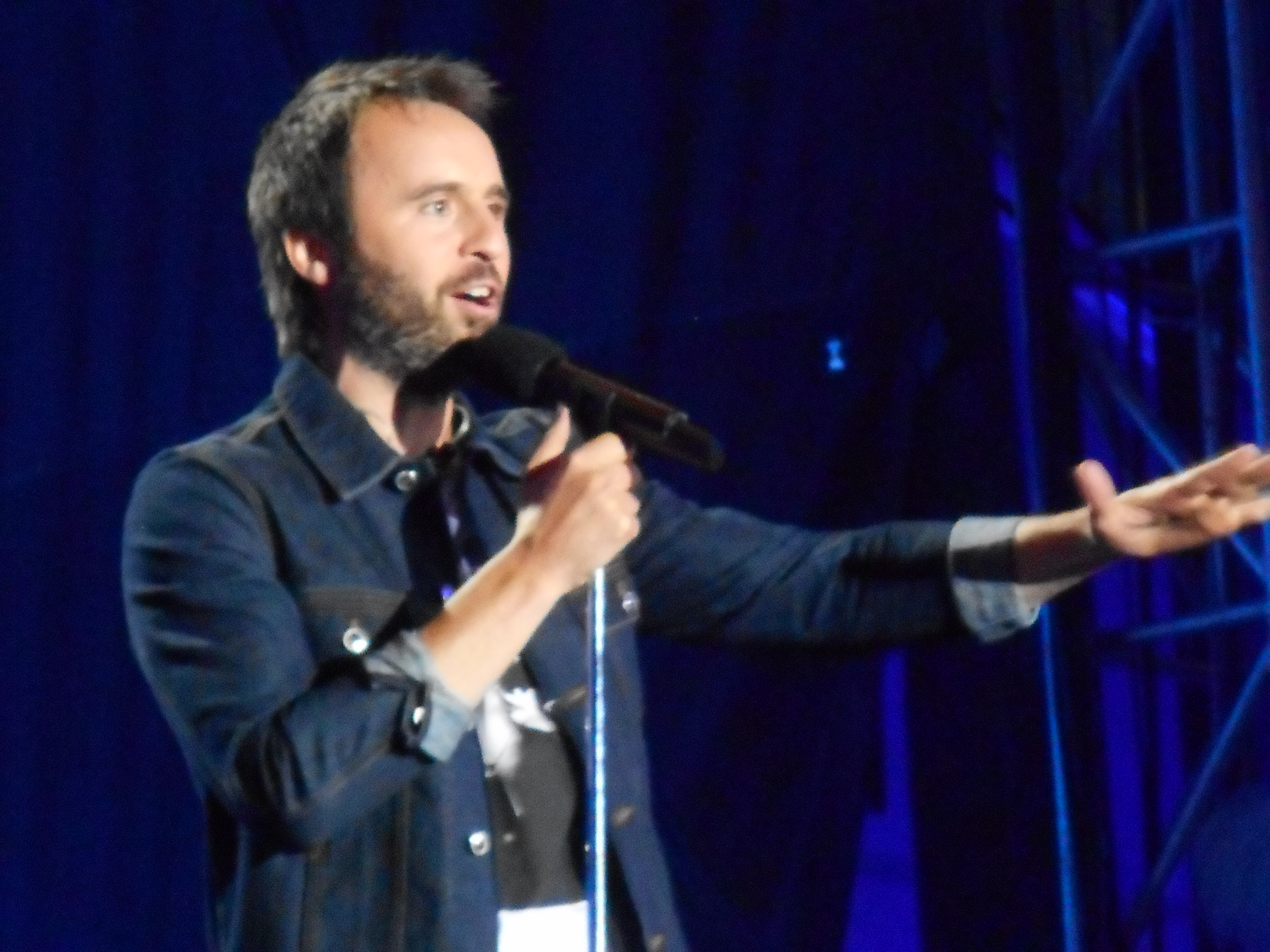
Louis-José Houde, a Québécois comedian and actor, performing during Quebec's Fête Nationale.

Comedy is a vast cultural sector. Quebec has created and is home to several different comedy festivals, including the Just for Laughs festival in Montreal, as well as the Grand Rire festivals of Quebec, Gatineau and Sherbrooke. The Association des professionnels de l'industrie de l'humour (APIH) is the main organization for the promotion and development of the cultural sector of humour in Quebec and the National School of Humour, created in 1988, trains future comedians in Quebec. The Ligue nationale d'improvisation (LNI), created in 1977, promotes a number of comedians by combining humour with improvisation theater. The Gala les Olivier, in honour of the former humorist Olivier Guimond, rewards the personalities of Quebec comedy. The National School of humour (École nationale de l'humour) was created in 1988 to form the next generations of Quebec comedians.

Many popular Québécois comedy shows exist, such as Cré Basile, Le zoo du Capitaine Bonhomme, Lundi des Ha! Ha !, Démons du midi, La petite vie, Les Bougon, Le sketch show, etc. There are also many comedy and cartoon shows for children, such as La boîte à surprise, Bobino, Le pirate Maboule, Fanfreluche, La Ribouldingue, Les 100 Tours de Centour, Patofville, Passe-Partout, Robin et Stella, Iniminimagimo, Vazimolo, Télé-Pirate, Bibi et Geneviève, Watatatow, Caillou, Cornemuse, Macaroni tout garni, Toc toc toc, Ramdam, Tactik, etc.

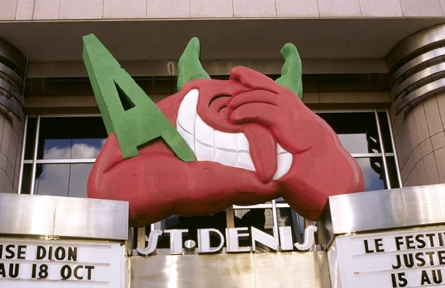
Mascot of the annual Festival Juste pour rire de Montréal / Just for Laughs Festival in Montreal.

Several prominent Quebec artists and humorous groups are known nationally and internationally, such as Rose Ouellette (known as La Poune), Juliette Petrie, Stéphane Rousseau, François Pérusse, Gilles Latulippe, Yvon Deschamps, Marc Favreau (famous for his character of Sol, a hobo clown), Michael Noël (and the character of Capitaine Bonhomme), Jacques Desrosiers (performer of the famous clown Patof), Serge Thériault and Claude Meunier (as Ding et (and) Dong), Les Grandes Gueules, Lise Dion, Jean-Michel Anctil, Martin Matte, Garihanna Jean-Louis and Louis-José Houde, to name only a few. Some humorous programs are or were also popular such as Cré Basile, Le Zoo du Capitaine Bonhomme, Lundi des Ha! Ha! (Monday, Ha! Ha!), Démons du midi (Midday Devils), La Petite Vie, Les Bougon, and The sketch show (Quebec version). A famous show called Bye-Bye, broadcast each year on December 31, was a funny way to review the year just completed and laugh about any news (political or not) that happened that year.

Le Poisson D'Avril (April Fools) is an old French tradition involving sticking fish (usually paper ones) on people's back without their knowledge. It dates back to 1564, and is still to this day a tradition in Quebec. Now, in most other parts of the world, people play pranks on each other instead of the fish custom.

Prior to the modern Quebec sovereignty movement, many citizens of Quebec decided to express their dissatisfaction with federal elections by forming the Rhinoceros Party of Canada. The party fielded humorous candidates in many ridings with a satirical platform. They added colour to many otherwise drab elections for more than two decades. Children also have their comedy and animated cartoons such as The Surprise Box, Bobino, Le Pirate Maboule, Fanfreluche, the Ribouldingue, Les 100 tours de Centour, Patofville, Passe-Partout, Robin et Stella, Iniminimagimo, Vazimolo, Tele-Pirate, Bibi et Geneviève, Watatatow, Caillou, Cornemuse, Macaroni tout garni, Toc toc toc, Ramdam, Tactik and many more.

=== Literature ===
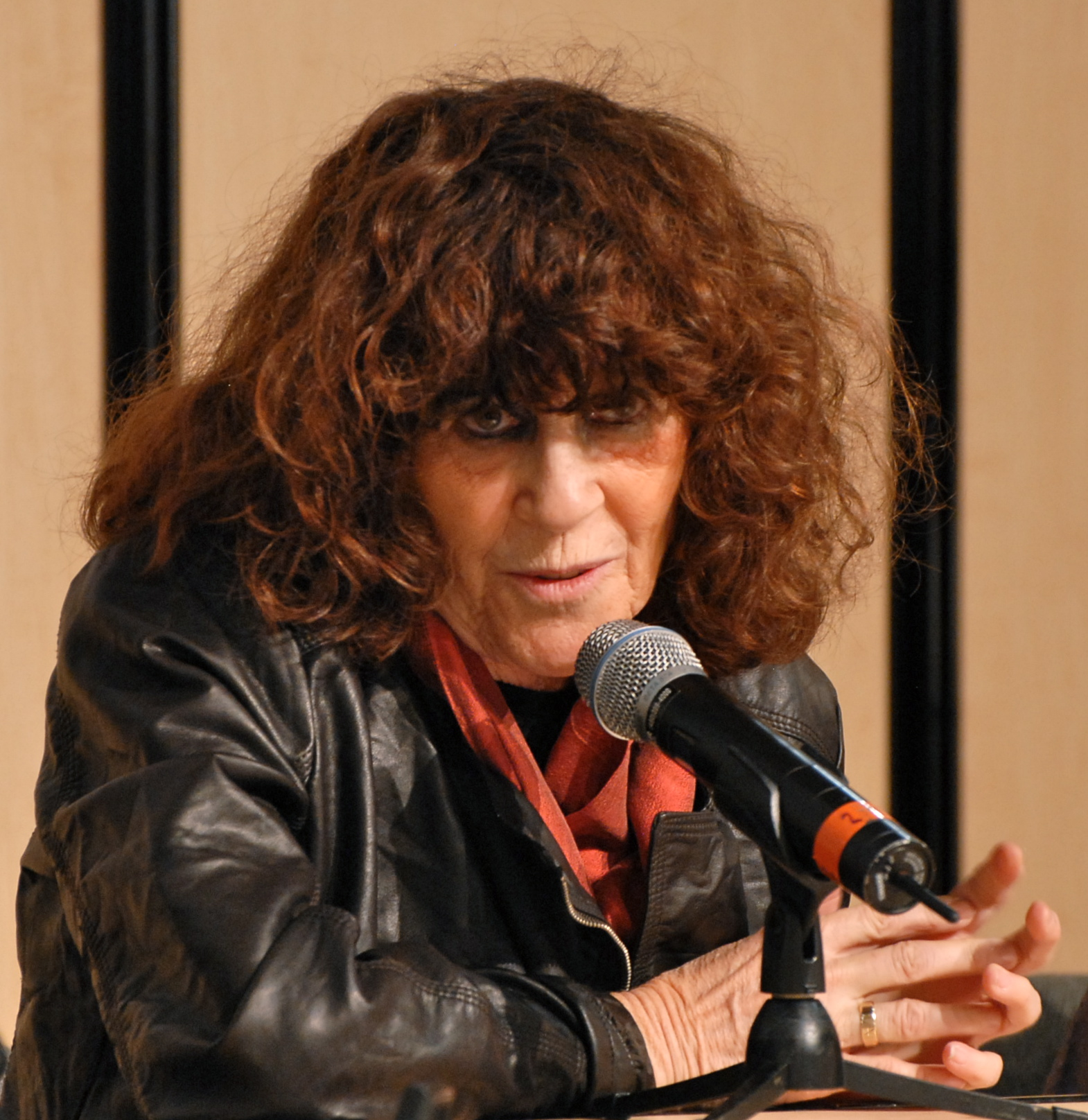
Marie-Claire Blais, one of Quebec's most well-known writers.

==== Early literature ====
The first literary output from Quebec occurred under the regime of New France, with the many poems written by the early inhabitants, as well as histories. It was, however, during the 19th century that Quebec novels were first published. The first Quebecois novel was written by Philippe Aubert de Gaspé in 1837, titled Le chercheur de trésor or L'influence d'un livre.

The period 1895 to 1930 saw a rapid growth in French literature in Quebec, and writers were heavily influenced by poetry and novels from Paris. Prominent Quebec writers of this period include Émile Nelligan, Victor Barbeau, Paul Morin, Guy Delahaye, René Dugas, René Chopin, Charles Ignace Adélard Gill, Jean-Aubert Loranger, Arthur de Bussières, Albert Lozeau, Robert Choquette, Albert Dreux, Gonzalve Desaulniers, Lionel Léveillé, Robert de Roquebrune, and Léo d'Yril.

==== Roman du terroir (1900–1960) ====
After 1900, Quebecois writers explored regional and ethnic identity in what has become called the roman du terroir (English: novel of the homestead, or from the land) movement. Writers who can be placed within the terroir framework include Camille Roy, Adjutor Rivard, Frère Marie-Victorin, Louis Hémon, Lionel Groulx, Alfred Desrochers, Albert Laberge, Blanche Lamontagne-Beauregard, Henriette Dessaulles, Germaine Guèvremont, Damase Potvin, Albert Ferland, Adélard Dugré, Pamphile Lemay, Ulric Gingras, Alphonse Désilets, Nérée Beauchemin and Rodolphe Girard.

The roman du terroir style of novel continued its popularity during the era sometimes called "La grande noirceur" (the great darkness), during the premiership of Maurice Duplessis, a time of extreme social and political conservatism in the province. Other types of novels developed during the 1940s and 1950s, such as the roman de moeurs urbaines (novel of urban mores), as exemplified by the writing of Gabrielle Roy, Ringuet, and Roger Lemelin. Another development in the novel was the roman psychologique (psychological novel), showing the inner turmoil of a character who cannot live "within the colonized society that values religion, family, and a mythic past". In the meantime, English-language writers from Quebec became prominent in Canada. Writers of this period include Claude-Henri Grignon, Félix-Antoine Savard, Ringuet, Anne Hébert, Saint-Denys Garneau, Alain Grandbois, Rina Lasnier, Clément Marchand, Roger Lemelin, Gabrielle Roy, Yves Thériault, Félix Leclerc, Isabelle Legris, Claire Martin, Francis Reginald Scott, Jean-Charles Harvey, A.M. Klein, Irving Layton, Léo-Paul Desrosiers, André Langevin, Gérard Bessette, Gratien Gélinas, Marcel Dubé, Paul-Émile Borduas, Robert Élie, Robert Charbonneau, André Giroux, Claude Gauvreau, Rex Desmarchais, Gilles Hénault, and Jean Le Moyne. Among the well-known literary works produced in Quebec at this time were two cultural and political manifestos, Prisme d'yeux (1948) and Refus global (1948), early indications of the beginning of the Quiet Revolution in Quebec.

==== Quiet Revolution (1960–1970) ====
The Quiet Revolution began in earnest during the 1960s. The expression of Quebecois identity, or even nationalist sentiment, shaped much of Quebecois literature in the period 1960 to 1970. The Cold War, the feminist movement, the influence of the United States' "counterculture", the concerns of the baby boom generation, and other cultural developments sweeping the Western world during the era also permeated the works of Quebec writers. Writers of the Quiet Revolution era include Gaston Miron, Réjean Ducharme, Hubert Aquin, Marie-Claire Blais, Jacques Ferron, Jacques Poulin, Roch Carrier, Georges Dor, Jacques Godbout, Michel Tremblay, Jacques Renaud, Victor-Lévy Beaulieu, André Major, Jacques Brault, Paul-Marie Lapointe, Gatien Lapointe, Paul Chamberland, Fernand Ouellette, Roland Giguère, Alphonse Piché, Jean-Guy Pilon, Françoise Loranger, Jean-Claude Germain, Jean Barbeau, Michel Garneau, Fernand Dumont, Pierre Vadeboncœur, Pierre Vallières, Jean Bouthillette. Also writing during this era were Mavis Gallant, Denis Vanier, Michèle Lalonde, Lucien Francoeur, Patrick Straram, Gérald Godin, Michel Beaulieu, Nicole Brossard, Pierre Morency, Marcel Bélanger, Hélène Brodeur, Claude Jasmin, Gilles Archambault, Gilbert La Rocque, Jean-Pierre Ronfard, Normand Chaurette, Leonard Cohen, Jean Éthier-Blais, Yves Beauchemin, and André Loiselet.

==== Post-modernism and today ====
After 1970, themes and techniques of post-modernism began to influence much of Quebec's literature. Writers prominent from 1970 onward include Mordecai Richler, Nicole Brossard, Louky Bersianik, France Théoret, Madeleine Gagnon, Denise Boucher, François Charron, Claude Beausoleil, Yolande Villemaire, Marie Uguay, Roger Desroches, Gaétan Brulotte, Jean-Yves Collette, Daniel Gagnon, Michel Khalo, François Ricard, Marie José Thériault, André Belleau, and Claudine Bertrand. Popular French-language contemporary writers of the late 20th and early 21st century include Louis Caron, Suzanne Jacob, Yves Beauchemin, and Gilles Archambault.

English-language writers of Quebec include David Homel, Neil Bissoondath and Yann Martel. An association, the Quebec Writers' Federation, promotes English-language literature of Quebec and gives out an annual prize to Quebec writers. English-language literature from Quebec is sometimes classified under English-Canadian literature.

Literature has been produced in other minority languages in Quebec, such as Hebrew, Yiddish (including an active Yiddish theatre scene in Montreal during the early to mid-20th century), and indigenous aboriginal languages.

=== Music ===
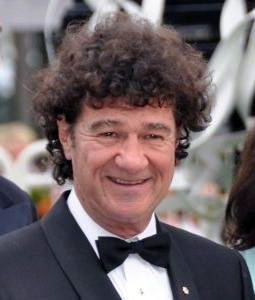
Singer-songwriter Robert Charlebois is well known for using Quebec French in his music.

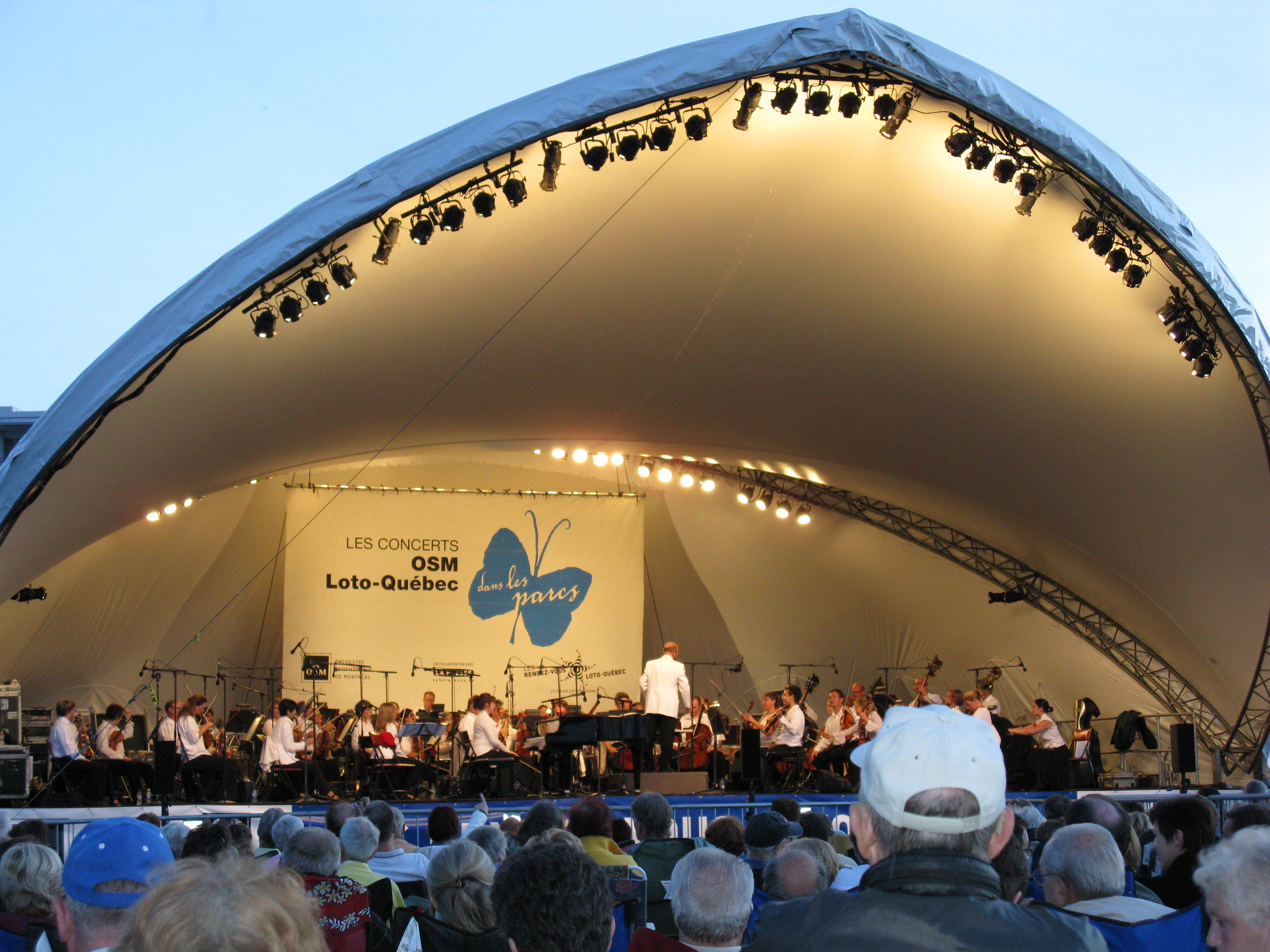
An outdoor performance by the Montreal Symphony Orchestra.

The traditional folk music of Quebec has two main influences: the traditional songs of France, and the influence of Celtic music, with reels and songs that show a definite affinity with the traditional music of Canada's Maritime Provinces, Ireland, Scotland, and Brittany. Various instruments are more popular in Quebec's culture: harmonica (music-of-mouth or lip-destruction), fiddle, spoons, jaw harp and accordion. The podorythmie is a characteristic of traditional Quebec music and means giving the rhythm with the feet. This traditional music is becoming increasingly more popular, with the success of groups such as La Bottine Souriante.

From Quebec's musical repertoire, the song À la claire fontaine was the anthem of the New France, Patriots and French Canadian, then replaced by O Canada. Currently, the song Gens du pays is by far preferred by many Quebecers to be the national anthem of Quebec.

Quebec has also produced world-class classical music over the years, such as the Montreal Symphony Orchestra (MSO), founded in 1934. Under the direction of Swiss conductor Charles Dutoit from 1977 to 2002, the MSO gained a truly international reputation. Montreal is also home to the Orchestre Métropolitain, the Orchestre de la Francophonie, the early music ensemble Arion, the all-female ensemble La Pietà, created by violinist Angèle Dubeau, to name but a few; Quebec City is home to the Violons du Roy under the direction of Bernard Labadie and the Orchestre symphonique de Québec under the direction of Yoav Talmi. Quebec has a number of classical music festivals, such as the Festival de Lanaudière, Festival Orford chamber music festival held at the Orford Art Centre, and where the ensemble the Orford String Quartet was first formed.

Classical music aficionados can attend performances in a number of concert halls. Salle Wilfrid Pelletier at the Place des Arts cultural centre in the heart of Montreal is home to the MSO. Montreal's McGill University also houses three concert halls: Pollack Hall, Tanna Schulich Hall and Redpath Hall. The Université de Montréal has its Salle Claude Champagne, named after Quebec composer Claude Champagne. The Grand Théâtre de Québec in Quebec City is home to the Orchestre symphonique du Québec. A regional centre, Rimouski, is home to the Orchestre symphonique de l'Estuaire and has a large concert hall, the Desjardins-Telus theatre.

Jazz also has a long tradition in Quebec. Montreal's annual Montreal International Jazz Festival draws a number of visitors each summer. Many Quebecers have made a name for themselves in the jazz world, such as Oscar Peterson, Oliver Jones, Karen Young, Lorraine Desmarais, Vic Vogel, Michel Donato, and Alain Caron.

A number of performers enjoy considerable success at home, both in terms of record sales and listenership, while remaining relatively unknown outside Quebec. In a number of cases, French-speaking Quebec singers are able to export their talent to France and Belgium. Belgian singer Lara Fabian followed the reverse path, moving to Quebec to seek a breakthrough in North America. Artists like Céline Dion and the pop-punk group Simple Plan have achieved considerable success in English-speaking countries by expanding their audience base. Celine Dion, for instance, has sold over 50 million albums in the United States alone.

Montreal also has a flourishing English-language music scene. Some of the well-known English-language musical acts from Quebec include Leonard Cohen, April Wine, The Box, Men Without Hats, Corey Hart, sisters Kate and Anna McGarrigle, Rufus Wainwright, Martha Wainwright, and Arcade Fire.

Quebec is also well known for their French-language country music. Though English-language country is found in Quebec as well, French is the primary version. French-language singers include Renée Martel, Gildor Roy, Patrick Norman, Willie Lamothe, Steph Carse, and Georges Hamel.

The Quebec scene is renowned in metal circles for its production of some of the world's finest technical and progressive death metal bands such as Voivod, Gorguts, Quo Vadis, Neuraxis and Martyr as well as Augury and Unexpect. The Quebec metal scene also produced other fine bands such as Kataklysm (northern hyperblast), Despised Icon (deathcore) and Cryptopsy (death metal).

Various musical events are held throughout Quebec, such as the Festival d'été de Québec, the Emerging Music Festival of Rouyn-Noranda, Festival en chanson de Petite-Vallée, the Montreal International Jazz Festival, the Granby International Song Festival, the International Festival of Rhythms of the World in Saguenay, the Festival Western de Saint-Tite, the Montreal FrancoFolies festival, the Mondial des Cultures of Drummondville, the White Nights of Anse de Roche, Woodstock en Beauce, etc. Other festivals join music to fireworks, such as Grand Feux Loto-Québec at the Montmorency Falls, Quebec City, the International Loto-Québec Firework at amusement park La Ronde, Montreal, or the Grands Feux du Casino in the park of Lac-Leamy in Gatineau.

=== Theatre ===
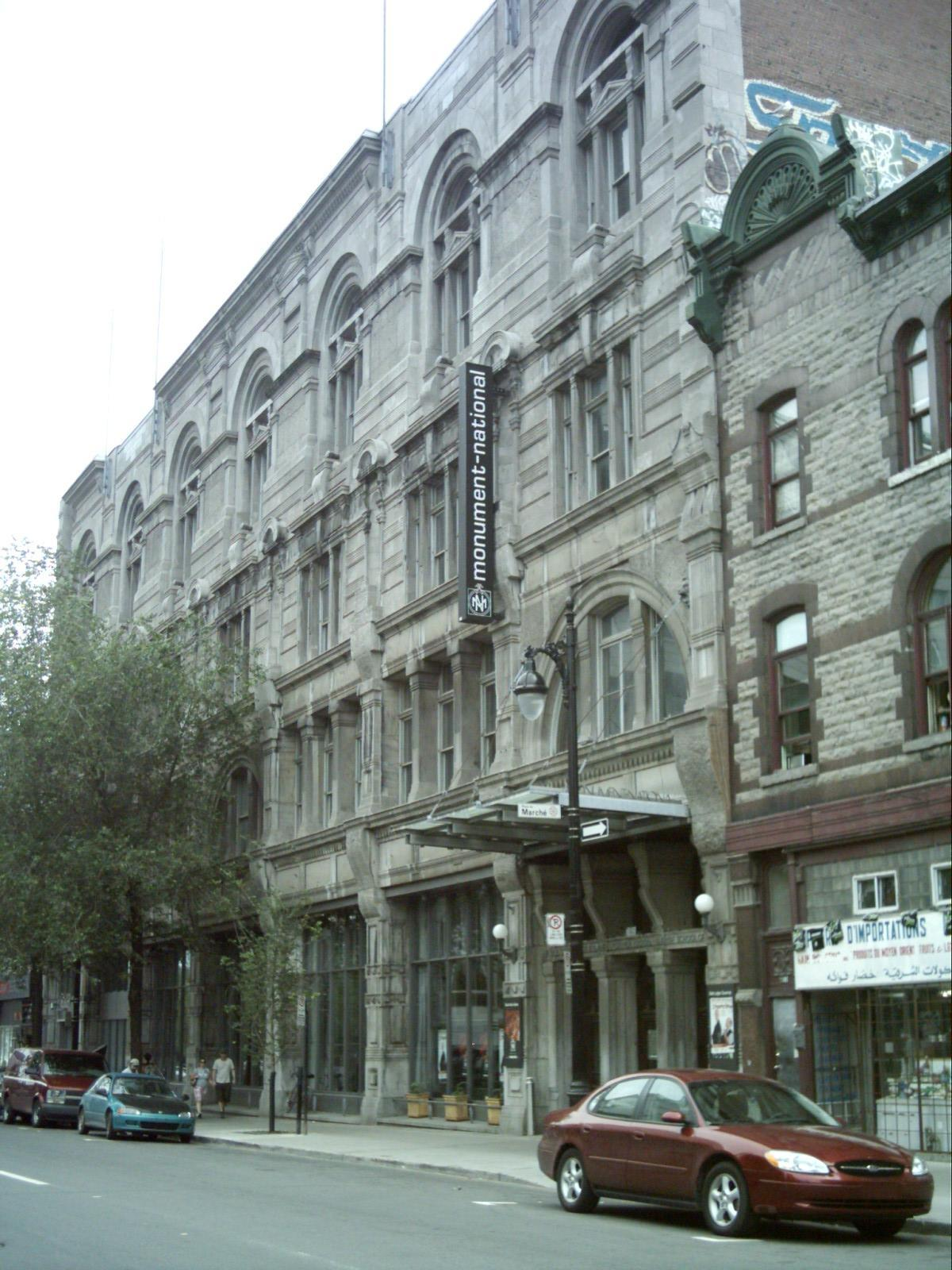
The historic Monument-National theatre in Montreal.

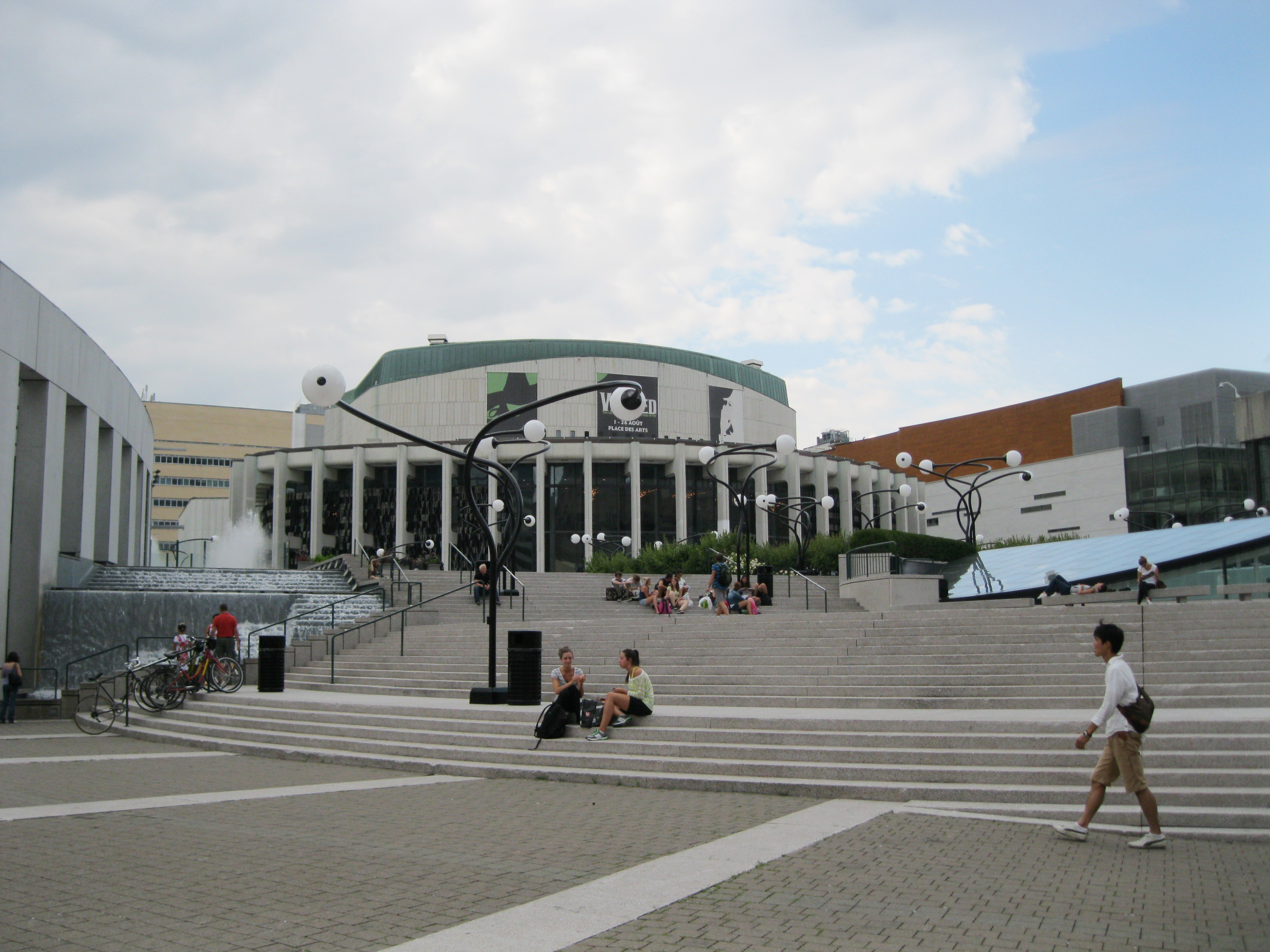
The Place des Arts performing arts complex in downtown Montreal.

Quebec theatre was largely based on plays originating in France, Great Britain, or the United States before the mid-20th century, when plays written by Quebec dramatists gained popularity. Gratien Gélinas gained fame in Quebec and made an important contribution to Québécois identity with his character Fridolin, a Montreal boy who speaks in local slang (Joual) and has humorous views about everyday life.

Since the 1960s, many playwrights have embraced themes of modernism and post-modernism. This became known as the "new Quebec theatre", featuring works by playwrights such as Michel Tremblay, Jean-Claude Germain, and Jean Barbeau. Michel Tremblay, perhaps the most well known outside Quebec, brought themes such as Quebec identity, working class values, gay relationships, and urban life to the stage. Robert Lepage is prominent as a playwright, actor and director. Wajdi Mouawad is known for the critically praised play Scorched, which was filmed as Incendies.

Several landmark theatres are active in Montreal and Quebec City. The Théâtre du Nouveau Monde was established in Montreal in 1951 as a classical theatre company, staging works by Molière among others. During the Quiet Revolution, it began staging plays of a more contemporary and experimental nature as well. It lies within the precinct of the Quartier des Spectacles entertainment district, which encompasses more than 30 live performance halls. Other prominent theatres in the district include Théâtre Jean-Duceppe, Théâtre Saint-Denis, Montreal Arts Interculturels, and Théâtre Telus. There are also the Théâtre d'Aujourd'hui, Théâtre de Quat'Sous, Théâtre du Rideau Vert, Théâtre Espace Go, Monument-National, and Théâtre Maisonneuve among others. The Monument-National theatre is owned by the National Theatre School of Canada located in Montreal. The Maison Théâtre, founded in 1982, is an association of 27 theatre companies that has a mission to develop and promote theatre for children and youth. On its part, Quebec City is home to Capitole de Québec and Grand Théâtre de Québec.

Centaur Theatre is Montreal's largest English-language theatre.

The summer theatre is a true symbol of Quebec literature. Presented in the summer, it offers a variety of amusements, usually musicals or humorous dramas, sometimes outdoors, in rural and semi-rural regions of Quebec, in venues such as the theatre of la Dame de Cœur (the Lady of Heart) in Upton, Montérégie, the Grands Chênes (Great Oaks) Theatre in Kingsey Falls, Centre-du-Québec and the theatre of la Marjolaine in Eastmain, Estrie. The Quebec Theatre Academy and the Quebec Association of Playwrights (AQAD) are the main organizations for the promotion of literature and theatre in Quebec. The Quebec literary awards, including the Medal of the Académie des lettres du Québec, and the Soirée des Masques reward the important personalities of the year.

=== Visual arts ===
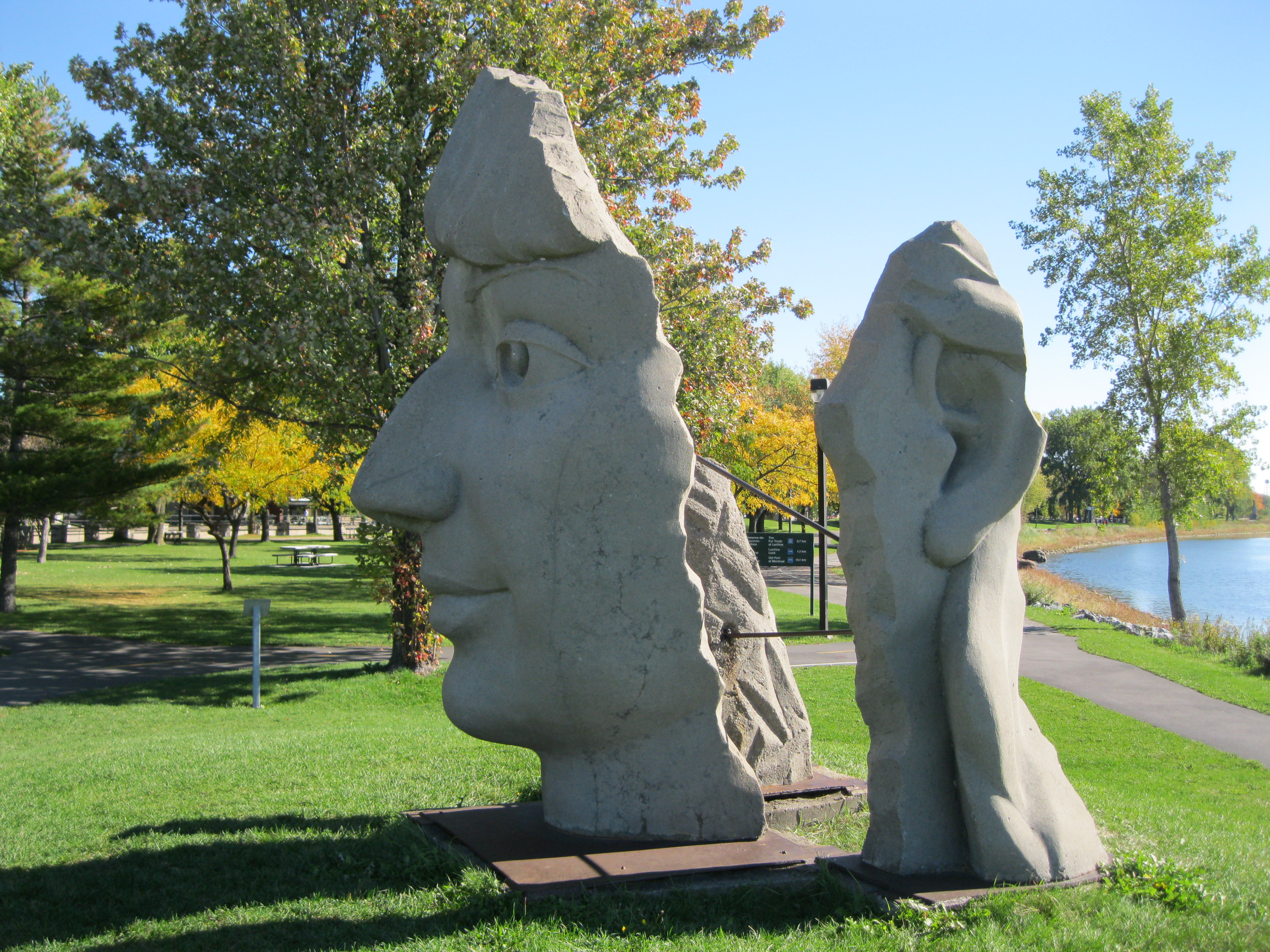
Monica by Jules Lasalle, Montreal.

For many years a mostly rural society, Quebec has a tradition of craft art, including the making of stained glass windows, as exemplified in the art of Marcelle Ferron.

The group known as Les Automatistes, and its best known artist, Jean-Paul Riopelle, is perhaps Quebec's best known contribution to the world of fine art.

During the 19th and early 20th century, Quebec art was dominated by landscape painting, although some artists, including James Wilson Morrice, Ozias Leduc, and Alfred Laliberté, showed a receptiveness to European trends such as symbolism and the style of Matisse.

Modern Quebec art developed during and after World War II. Alfred Pellan and Paul-Émile Borduas were leaders of the modern art movement in Quebec. Non-figurative works became notable among the creations of Quebec artists. Two broad trends during the post-War years have been identified: abstract expressionism (Marcelle Ferron, Marcel Barbeau, Pierre Gauvreau, and Jean-Paul Riopelle) and geometric abstraction (Jean-Paul Jérôme, Fernand Toupin, Louis Belzile, and Rodolphe de Repetigny). Jean Dallaire and Jean Paul Lemieux became prominent figurative painters during this period.

The most well-known painters of the 1960s include Guido Molinari, Claude Tousignant, and Yves Gaucher. During the 1960s, art "happenings" took place in Montreal, as in other artistic centres worldwide. Public art also became more visible in Montreal.

Montreal was the first city in Canada to participate in the Nuit Blanche (White Night) art festival, which is now an annual event. During this festival, art galleries and performance spaces open their doors to the public for evening exhibits.

In the 1990s, Charles Carson was "discovered" by Guy Robert, founder of the Musée d'Art Contemporain de Montréal. Struck by "the freshness and vivacity of the palette, the dynamism and diversity of the compositions, the rhythm that animates each segment of his paintings" (ROBERT, Guy. "Carson", Mont-Royal: Iconia, 1993, 55 pp.), he sees Carson as one of the main painters known in Quebec, and he coined the word "carsonism" to name his art.

== Architecture ==
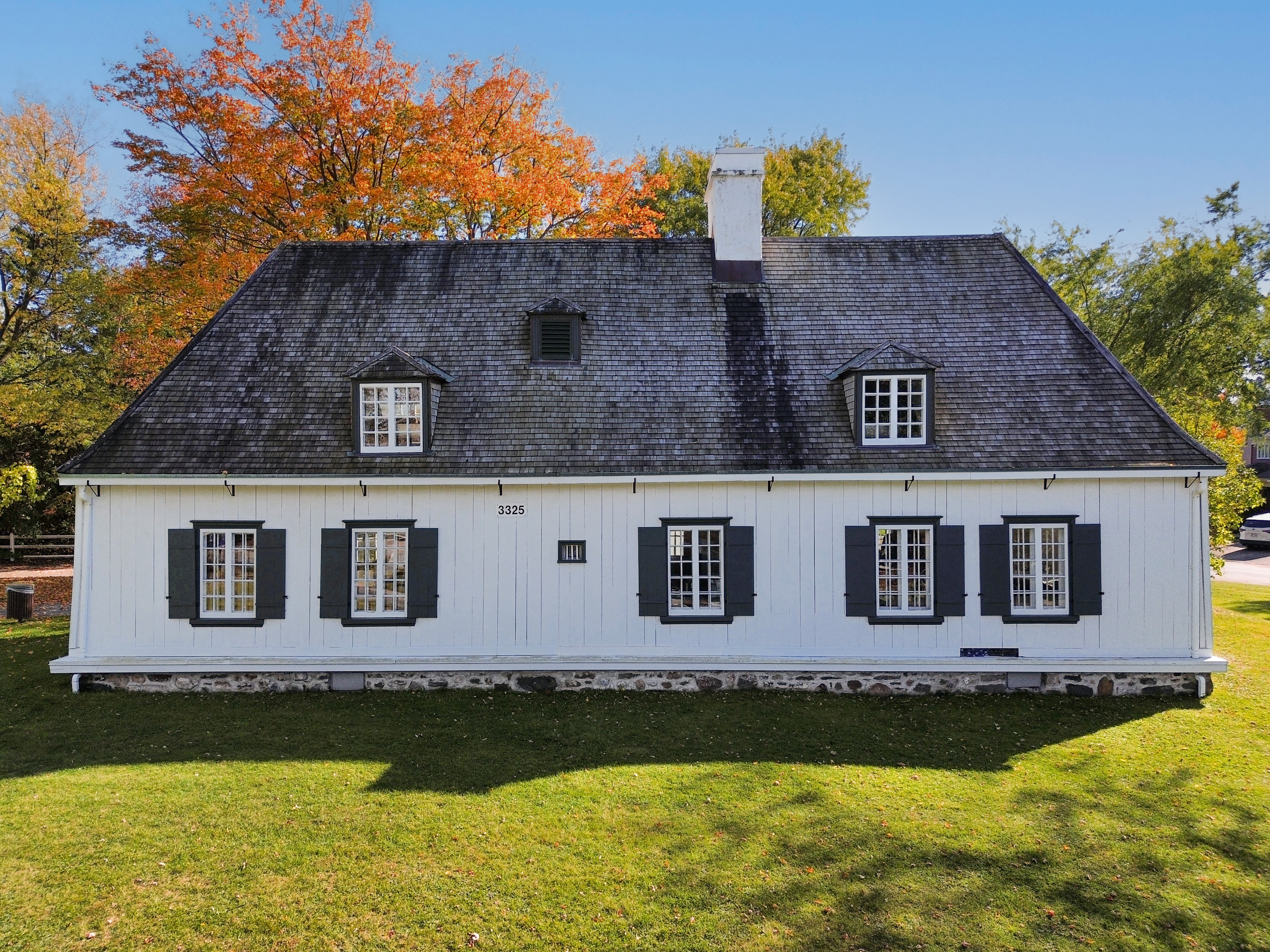
Maison Routhier in Sainte-Foy. This kind of Canadien-style house remains a symbol of Canadien nationalism.

Québécois architecture is characterized by its unique Canadien-style buildings as well as the juxtaposition of a variety of styles reflective of Quebec's history. When walking in any city or town, one can come across buildings with styles congruent to Classical, Neo-Gothic, Roman, Neo-Renaissance, Greek Revival, Neo-Classical, Québécois Neo-Classical, Victorian, Second Empire, Modern, Post-modern or Skyscrapers.

Canadien-style houses and barns were developed by the first settlers of New France who settled along the banks of the Saint Lawrence River. These buildings are rectangular one-storey structures with an extremely tall and steep roof, sometimes almost twice as tall as the house below. It is thought that this roof design may have been developed to prevent the accumulation of snow. They were usually built out of wood, but the surviving ones are almost all built out of stone.

Canadien-style churches also developed. Each new village would build its own church, often being inspired by the churches of Québec and Montreal in the process. These churches long served as landmarks while traversing rural Quebec and were built in the center of the town. Quebec is often said to possess the most beautiful churches in North America.

== Lifestyle ==
=== Family life ===
During the 1950s and 1960s, Quebec maintained record fertility rates, with the Roman Catholic church using their priests (established in all parishes and small towns) to guide and direct people's attitudes and morals. In the post–Quiet Revolution era, this attitude completely changed. In 2001, the fertility rate in Quebec was 1.474 per thousand.

In Quebec, many, if not all, married women retain their maiden names when they marry, as was the case in the Middle Ages. This is mandated in the Civil Code of Quebec. This followed the 1970s strong feminist movement and the Quiet Revolution. Since June 24, 2002, Quebec has had a civil union system available to both opposite-sex and same-sex couples. On March 19, 2004, Quebec became the third province in Canada to legally perform a same-sex marriage, following a court challenge brought by Michael Hendricks and René Leboeuf. The province is known as one of the most tolerant and gay friendly places in North America.

=== Food ===
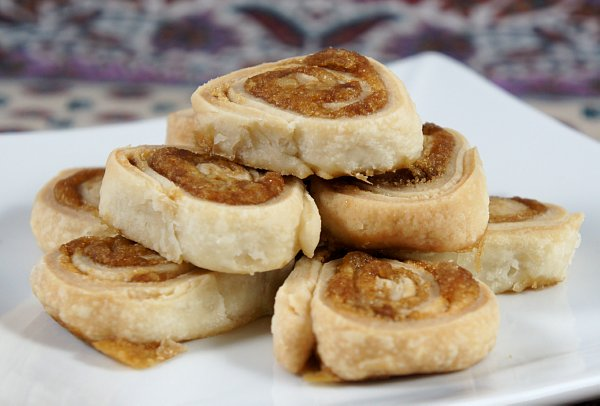
Pet de soeur, a traditional Quebec pastry.

As in European countries like Italy or France, where cooking is considered one of the fine arts, fine dining is appreciated by those of Quebec society who can afford it. Some small communities even advertise inns where the chef has an international reputation. This may be partly explained by a strong immigration in the 1960s and 1970s from Italy, Belgium, Switzerland and France. Many of those immigrants were waiters, cooks and chefs. Foods from Quebec include most of the foods from Canada, The Americas, Northern Africa, Asia, Europe and then some other scattered foods.

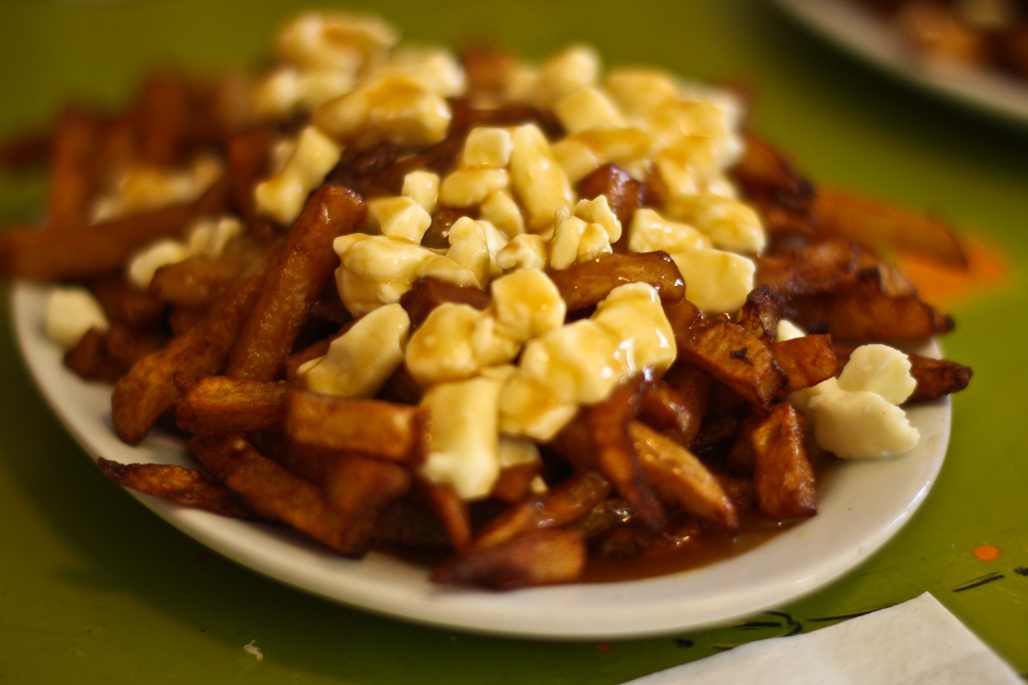
A classic poutine from La Banquise in Montreal

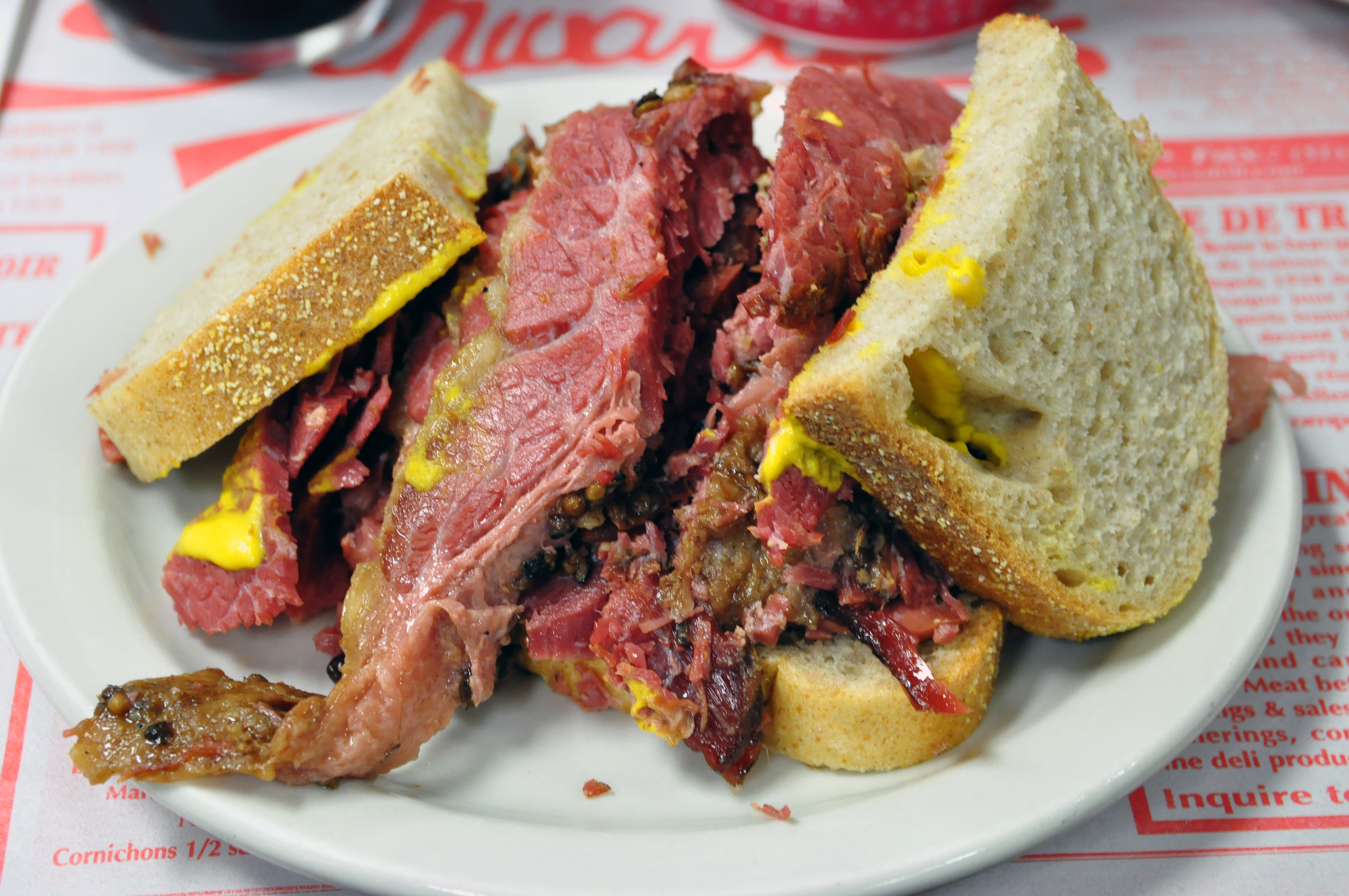
Montreal-style smoked meat from Schwartz's in Montreal

The traditional Quebecois cuisine descends from 16th century French cuisine, the fur trade and a history of hunting. French settlers populating North America were interested in a new cuisine to confront the climate and the needs arising from the work of colonization. It has many similarities with Acadian cuisine. Quebec's cuisine has also been influenced by learning from First Nation, by English cuisine and by American cuisine. Quebec is most famous for its Tourtière, Pâté Chinois, Poutine, St. Catherine's taffy among others. "Le temps des sucres" is a period during springtime when many Quebecers go to the sugar shack (cabane à sucre) for a traditional meal. Traditional dishes are also the star of Le temps des fêtes (holiday season, a period which covers the winter holidays.

Quebec is the biggest maple syrup producer on the planet. About 72% of the maple syrup sold on the international market (and 90% of the maple syrup sold in Canada) originates from Quebec. The province has a long history of developing and perfecting the craft of producing maple syrup, and creating new maple-derived products.

Quebec has produced beer since the beginning of colonization especially with the emergence of spruce beer. Quebec also produces a great number of high-quality wines including ice wine and ice cider. Because of the climate and available resources, it is only since the 1980s that these drinks can be produced in industrial quantities. Today there are nearly a hundred breweries and companies, including Unibroue, Molson Coors, Labatt and many others.

Quebec has produced cheese for centuries. Most of the first cheeses were soft cheeses, but after the Conquest of New France, hard cheese began to be created as well. The first cheese-making school in North America was established in Saint-Denis-de-Kamouraska in 1893. It was at this moment that the monks of La Trappe of Oka began to produce the famous Oka cheese. Today there are over 700 different cheeses in Quebec.

=== Work ===
The province at the beginning of the 20th century was known for its low-paid blue-collar workers employed in textiles, paper plants and shops. Quebec also has a long tradition in forestry. In the first part of the 20th century, many lumber camps in Maine, Vermont and New Hampshire were staffed by French-Canadian workers.

Despite a nationwide decline in union membership in Canada since 1981, Quebec has sustained one of the highest rates of union membership in the country. Quebec is the only jurisdiction in North America where a Walmart has ever successfully unionized, although the store closed shortly thereafter.

=== Fashion ===
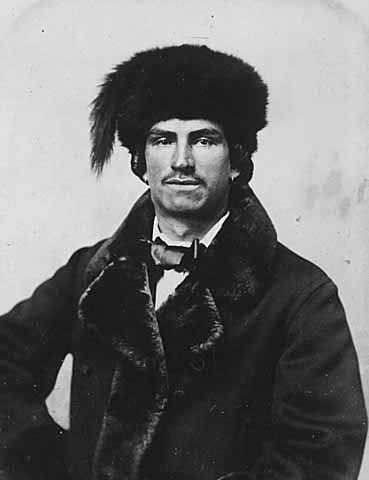
A Voyageur wearing a fur hat and a capote coat

During the 17th century, the nobles and the bourgeois followed the fashions of France. They were always one year late to the fashion of Paris because it took one year for the King's ship to arrive. The habitants, including the lords and serfs of the seigneuries, adapted their clothes to the customs of Native Americans: women wore shorter skirts and shawls, and men wore mitasses (a type of leggings originating with First Nations), moccasins and woolen toques. Many poorer women often arranged their hair on Sunday in a more sophisticated fashion, despite administrators of the colony stating that this style was reserved for the bourgeois and nobles. Some women wore clothes deemed indecent, with breasts almost visible.

The Coureur des bois and Voyageurs wore similar clothing. During the colder months, they would wear a large coat made of deer, moose, or caribou skin with a large belt around the middle, called a Ceinture fléchée, made of leather or colorful wool. Voyageurs had the option of wearing clothes supplied by their employer, so a Voyageur who worked for the Hudson's Bay Company might have chosen to wear a capote coat with the traditional HBC stripes on them. Though, those who decided to make their own capot could style it to their whims. On their heads, they either wore a fur hat or a toque (a close-fitting knitted cap). Red toques appear frequently in artwork, but other colours like grey and blue were worn too.

Today, Québécois clothes follow the styles of mass-produced fashion. Québécois haute fashion is pioneered today with stylists, such as Marie Saint-Pierre, Marie-Claude Guay, Philippe Dubuc, Leo Chevalier, etc. Works are sold in boutiques and shops like La Maison Simons, Ogilvy's, Holt Renfrew, Les Ailes de la Mode, etc. Designers who do business in Quebec are mainly concentrated in Les Cours Mont-Royal. La Grande Braderie exhibits the works of Québécois fashion designers. The gala de la Griffe d'or rewards the best of those creators.

=== Leisure and hobbies ===
==== Vacation ====
Starting probably in the late 1940s and reaching its peak in the 1970s, some Quebec residents have vacationed or spent the whole winter months in southeast Florida, mainly in the Hallandale Beach and Fort Lauderdale regions. Initially a trend that only the wealthy could afford, this destination is now considered by many as outdated and unstylish. It did, however, spur the coining of the term "Floribécois", a Quebec snowbird. The increasing real estate taxes might explain why Quebecers increasingly tend to visit the North Miami area instead of residing there for part of the year. Many snowbirds owned a trailer or a house, but were renting the land where their property was located. New locations and resort areas such as Mexico, Cuba, the Dominican Republic and Caribbean islands are now favoured by many Quebecers to spend their traditional sunny one or two-week vacations.

A lot of Quebec tourists go to The Wildwoods or Cape May along the Jersey Shore in the summer; in 2010 it was estimated 13 percent of the tourists to the area came from Quebec and brought in around $650 million. Several hotels in The Wildwoods and Cape May are named to attract Canadian tourists. Cape May County began targeting Quebec tourists around 1970 and once operated a tourism office in downtown Montreal.

==== Video games ====
Video games are popular in Quebec, as they are in the rest of Canada and the United States. The majority of video games come from either the United States, Canada, or Japan. Only some games have been translated into French, but the government of Quebec and the Entertainment Software Association of Canada made a deal in 2007 that will require all games sold in Quebec to be translated into French by 2009, as long as they are available in another part of the world in French as well. In some cases the game includes optional French text and/or subtitles, while in other cases the game is fully translated in French complete with dubbed voice acting (as is the case with games by Montreal-based Ubisoft), which may be recorded either locally or in Europe.

== Sports ==
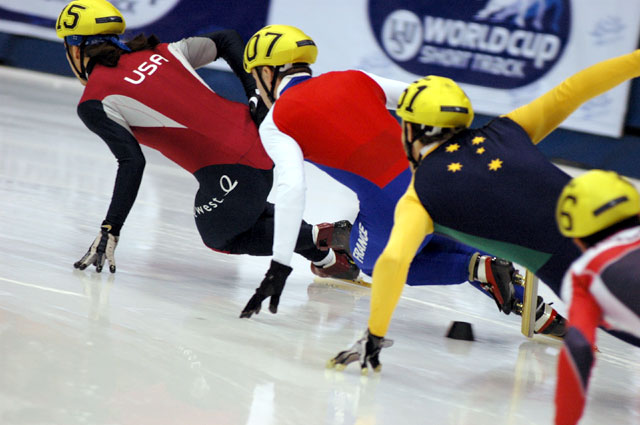
500 metres short track speed skating heat at the 2004 World Cup in Saguenay.

Sports in Quebec constitutes an essential dimension of Quebec culture. The practice of sports and outdoor activities in Quebec was influenced largely by its geography and climate.

Ice hockey is by far the sport of choice in Quebec. The rules of the game were set up by students at McGill University in 1875. There are many junior ice hockey teams, and one would be hard-pressed to find even the smallest community without a rink available for organized play. Institutions include the NHL's Montreal Canadiens, the NHL's former Quebec Nordiques, the Quebec Major Junior Hockey League, and the governing body Hockey Québec.

Association football, known in North America as soccer, Canadian football, baseball, basketball, rugby union and volleyball are the most practised and watched sports during the summer season in Quebec.

Cross-country skiing is very easily accessible due to the abundance of snow and an unending supply of open fields. With the Laurentian Mountains close at hand, some of the best downhill skiing in Canada east of the Rockies is to be found in Quebec as well.

The snowmobile (or "skidoo"), invented in Quebec by Joseph-Armand Bombardier, is a popular hobby, though its reputation has been marred by several deaths each year. Through the 1990s, the Mont Tremblant and Mont Sainte-Anne ski resorts became popular destinations internationally.

Another popular pastime is ice fishing. Rivers freeze over quickly come wintertime and as soon as the ice is solid enough to walk upon, one can find dozens of tiny homemade shacks (ice houses) dotting the frozen surface.

Quebec is home to many professional sports teams and events, the majority of which call Montreal home.

Québec athletes have performed well at the Winter Olympics over recent years. They won 12 of Canada's 29 medals at the most recent Winter Olympics in Pyeongchang (2018); they won 12 of the 27 Canadian medals in Sochi (2014); and 9 of the 26 Canadian medals in Vancouver (2010).

=== Existing teams ===
- Montreal Canadiens (National Hockey League)
- Montreal Alouettes (Canadian Football League)
- CF Montréal (Major League Soccer)
- Québec Capitales (Canadian-American Association of Professional Baseball)
- Quebec Remparts (Quebec Major Junior Hockey League)
- Sherbrooke Phoenix (Quebec Major Junior Hockey League)

=== Defunct teams ===
- Montreal Expos (Major League Baseball)
- Quebec Nordiques (National Hockey League)
- Montreal Express (National Lacrosse League)
- Équipe Cycliste Cascades (cycling)

=== Events ===
- Canadian Grand Prix (Formula One racing)
- NASCAR Canadian Tire Series
- Grand Prix de Trois-Rivières (Atlantic Championship)

=== Athletes ===
Noted Quebec athletes include:

- Baseball (Éric Gagné, Russell Martin, Dick Lines)
- Basketball (Bill Wennington, Samuel Dalembert, Joel Anthony)
- Cycling (Geneviève Jeanson, Lyne Bessette)
- Diving (Alexandre Despatie, Sylvie Bernier, Annie Pelletier)
- Figure skating: (Joannie Rochette, Isabelle Brasseur, David Pelletier, Josée Chouinard, Valérie Marcoux)
- Hockey (Maurice Richard, Guy Lafleur, Mario Lemieux, Mike Bossy, Jean Béliveau, Patrick Roy, Martin Brodeur, Vincent Lecavalier, Doug Harvey, Roberto Luongo, Joe Malone, Jean-Gabriel Pageau)
- Judo (Nicolas Gill)
- Lethwei (Dave Leduc)
- Mixed martial arts (Georges St-Pierre, David Loiseau)
- Short-track speed skating (Marc Gagnon, Nathalie Lambert, Éric Bédard)
- Long-track speed skating (Gaétan Boucher)
- Racing (Gilles Villeneuve, Jacques Villeneuve, Alex Tagliani, Patrick Carpentier)
- Football (Laurent Duvernay-Tardif, Paul Lambert, Éric Lapointe, Terry Evanshen, Ian Beckles),
- Soccer (Samuel Piette, Sandro Grande, Adam Braz, Patrick Leduc), Nick DeSantis), Mauro Biello)
- Moguls (Alexandre Bilodeau)

== Media ==
Quebec is dominated by French-language media, although there are a small number of English-language media centred in Montreal. Quebecers also have access to Canadian English-language media, as well as media from the United States, France, and elsewhere. Québecor Média is a significant corporate presence in Quebec media; the company also controls the large Sun Media chain across Canada.

The major newspapers in Quebec include the broadsheets La Presse (Montreal), Le Devoir (Montreal) and Le Soleil (Quebec City), the tabloids Le Journal de Montréal (Montreal) and Le Journal de Québec (Quebec City), and the English-language broadsheet The Gazette (Montreal). Other smaller centres have their own newspapers, and there are also several free papers including "alternative weeklies" and daily micro-presses available in cafes and the Montreal Metro.

A number of television networks and stations broadcast in Quebec. Two public broadcasters broadcast over the air in French: Radio-Canada, operated by the federal government, and Télé-Québec, operated by the provincial government. Two private (commercial) broadcasters broadcast over the air in French: TVA (which generally has the highest ratings of all French-language broadcasters) and Noovo. These Quebec television networks produce a considerable amount of their content locally, including the popular téléromans.

The three main Canadian English networks also broadcast over the air in Quebec: public broadcaster CBC and private broadcasters CTV and Global. These networks provide some local content, primarily news and public affairs programming. Montreal's CJNT, owned by Rogers Sports & Media, is an affiliate of the English language Citytv network, while CFHD provides multicultural programming.

A number of networks are only available to cable and satellite subscribers. Subscribers can watch a wide range of specialized French-language TV channels. Amongst these offerings is TV5, the international French-language network. Most major Canadian English-language cable and satellite networks are also available.

Most American television networks are available in Quebec, although in some locations farther from the Canada–United States border they are not available over the air, but only on cable. The PBS affiliates from the neighbouring states, WETK in Burlington, Vermont, and WCFE in Plattsburgh, New York, sometimes run Quebec-specific material.

== Cultural institutions ==
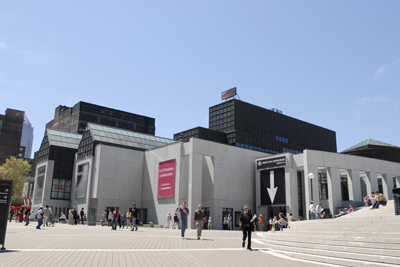
Museum of Contemporary Art in Montreal.

Many cultural institutions were set up in Quebec in the wake of the Quiet Revolution.

Among the key institutions are:

- the Archives nationales du Québec (Quebec National Archives) created in 1920, and the Bibliothèque nationale du Québec (Quebec National Library) created in 1967, now combined into the Bibliothèque et Archives nationales du Québec
- the Conservatoire de musique et d'art dramatique du Québec, a network of nine Academies created in 1942
- the provincial public broadcaster Télé-Québec created in 1968
- the Conseil des arts et des lettres du Québec (Quebec Council of Arts and Letters) created in 1992.
- the interdisciplinary progressive music and fine arts institution Lambda School of Music and Fine Arts founded in 2008

Quebec's rich heritage of culture and history can be explored through a network of museums, which include the Musée d'art contemporain de Montréal, the Musée de la civilisation and the Musée national des beaux-arts du Québec.

Many of Quebec's artists have been educated in universities' arts faculties and specialized art schools. Notable schools include the Conservatoire de musique et d'art dramatique du Québec, the École nationale de théâtre du Canada and the École nationale de cirque.

== Prizes and awards ==
Quebec rewards its singers, musicians, authors, actors, directors, dancers, etc. regularly. Among the awards are:

- Athanase David Awards (Literature)
- Félix Awards (Music)
- Gémeaux Awards (Television and film)
- Jutra Awards (Cinema)
- Masques Awards (Theatre)
- Olivier Guimond Awards (Humour)
- Opus Awards (Concert music)
- Prix du Québec (Several cultural fields)

== Holidays and traditions ==
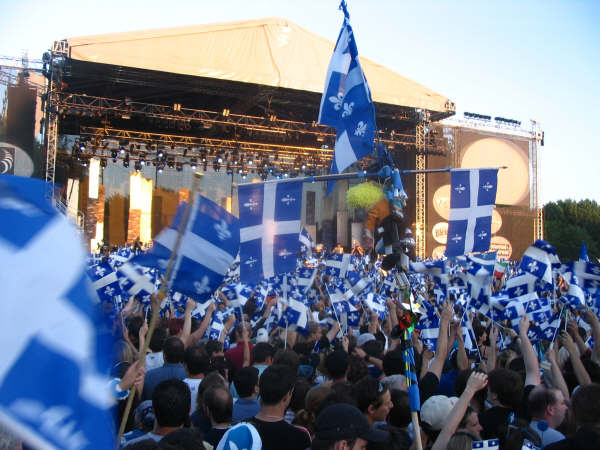
St-Jean-Baptiste Day celebrations at Maisonneuve park in Montréal.

Quebec is home to a number of unique holidays and traditions not found anywhere else. St-Jean-Baptiste Day is one of Quebec's biggest holidays. In 1977, the Quebec Parliament declared June 24, the day of La Saint-Jean-Baptiste, to be Quebec's National Holiday. La Saint-Jean-Baptiste, or La St-Jean, honours French Canada's patron saint, John the Baptist. On this day, the song "Gens du pays", by Gilles Vigneault, is often heard. This song is commonly regarded as Quebec's unofficial anthem. Festivities occur on June 23 and 24 all over Quebec. In big cities like Quebec City or Montreal, shows are organized in main public spaces (such as on the Plains of Abraham in Quebec City, or in Maisonneuve Park in Montreal) where several of the most popular Québécois artists sing until late at night. Festivities include parades, bonfires, fireworks, drinking, feasts, musical concerts, flag waving, contests and patriotic speeches.

National Patriots' Day, a statutory holiday in Quebec, is also a unique public holiday, which honours the patriotes who fought the British in the Patriots' War with displays of the patriote flag, marches, music, public speeches, ceremonies and banquets. Le Vieux de '37 ("The Old Man of '37") is an illustration by Henri Julien that depicts a patriot of this rebellion. Le Vieux de '37 is one of the best known symbols of the rebellion and is sometimes added at the centre of Patriote flags.

Moving Day is a tradition where leases terminate on July 1. This creates a social phenomenon where everyone seems to be moving out at the same time. The Construction Holiday was born out of legislation which synchronized a two-week holiday in July for the entire construction industry. Other traditions include: the Temps des sucres (a time in March when people go to sugar shacks), Québécois snowbirds (people who migrate to Florida every winter), and the Noël des campeurs (campgrounds celebrating Christmas in July).

Quebecois can also have different ways of celebrating certain holidays. A good example is the Réveillon, a giant feast and party which takes place during Christmas Eve and New Year's Eve and goes on until midnight. Traditional dishes like tourtière or cipâte are offered, and rigaudon, spoon and/or violin may be played. La nuit de Jean Jabranche ("Jean Jabranche Night") is an annual holiday celebrated five days before Christmas on the evening of December 19. The night celebrates Jean Jabranche, an 18th-century folk hero who was believed to leave chocolates for children to prepare for the arrival of Père Noël five days later. The night is celebrated by leaving out branches of pine trees or sprigs of holly along with a mug of mulled wine. In turn, Jean Jabranche supposedly leaves chocolates for the children the next morning. April Fools' Day is called Poisson d'Avril ("April's Fish") because while pulling pranks is still important, there is another major tradition: sticking fish-shaped paper cutouts to people's backs without them noticing. During Halloween, the sentence used instead of "trick-or-treat!" varies depending on the region.

== National symbols ==
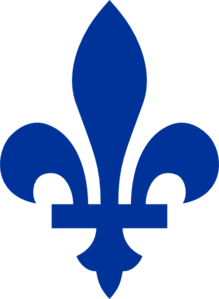
Quebec's fleur-de-lis are most often blue or white.

In 1939, the government of Quebec unilaterally ratified its coat of arms to reflect Quebec's political history: French rule (gold lily on blue background), followed by British rule (lion on red background), followed by Canadian rule (maple leaves), and with Quebec's motto below "Je me souviens". Je me souviens ("I remember") was first carved under the coat of arms of Quebec's Parliament Building in 1883. Je me souviens is an official part of the coat of arms and has been the official licence plate motto since 1978, replacing the previous one: La belle province ("the beautiful province"). The expression La belle province is still used as a nickname for the province. The fleur-de-lis, one of Quebec's most common symbols, is an ancient symbol of the French monarchy and was first shown in Quebec on the shores of Gaspésie in 1534 when Jacques Cartier arrived in Quebec for the first time. Saint-Jean-Baptiste, the patron saint of Canadiens, is honoured every 24 June during Saint-Jean-Baptiste Day. Finally, the Great Seal of Quebec is used to authenticate documents issued by the government of Quebec.

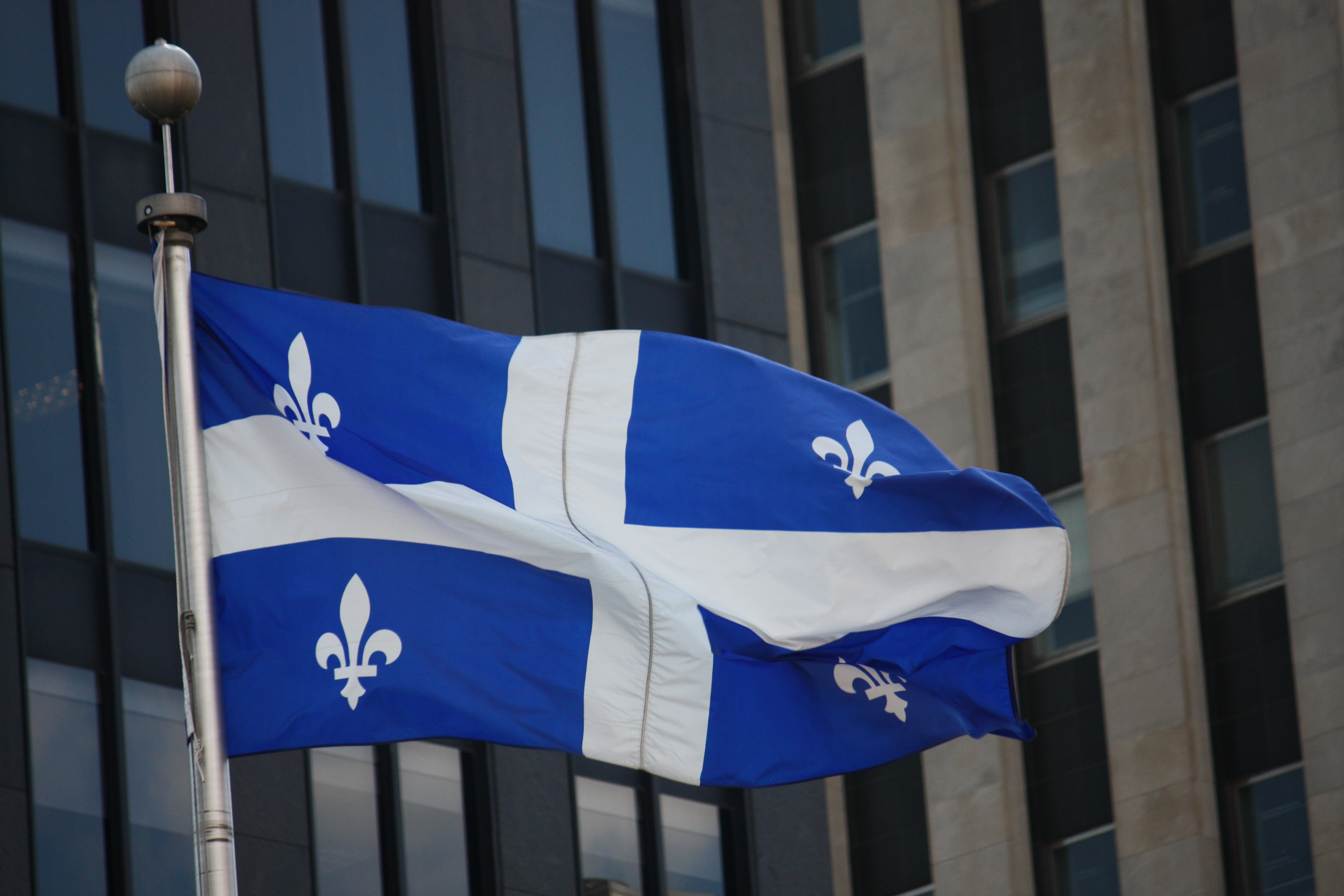
The Fleurdelisé flying at Place d'Armes in Montreal

When Samuel de Champlain founded Québec City in 1608, his ship hoisted the French merchant flag, which consisted of a white cross on a blue background. Later on, at the Battle of Carillon, in 1758, the Flag of Carillon was flown. This flag inspired the first members of the Saint-Jean-Baptiste Society to create the Carillon Sacré-Coeur flag, which consisted of a white cross on an azur background with white fleur-de-lis in each corner and a Sacred Heart surrounded by maple leaves in the centre. The Carillon Sacré-Coeur and French merchant flag went on to be the major inspirations for Québécois when creating Quebec's current flag in 1903, called the Fleurdelisé. The Fleurdelisé replaced the Union Jack on Quebec's Parliament Building on January 21, 1948, and it has flown there ever since.

Three new official symbols were adopted in the late 1900s:

- Iris versicolor, the floral emblem of Quebec since 1999. It was chosen because it blooms around the time of Quebec's Fête nationale.
- The snowy owl, the avian emblem of Quebec since 1987. It was selected by the Québécois government to symbolize Quebec's winters and northern climate.
- The yellow birch, the tree emblem of Quebec since 1993. It was picked to emphasize the importance Québécois give to the forests. The tree is admired for its diverse uses, its commercial value and its autumn colours.

In 1998, the Montreal Insectarium sponsored a poll to choose an official insect for Quebec. The white admiral butterfly (Limenitis arthemis) won with 32% of the 230 660 votes. However, the white admiral was never accepted by the Government of Quebec as an official symbol.

== Quebec's diaspora ==
The earliest immigrants to the Canadian prairies were French Canadians from Quebec. Most Franco-Albertans, Fransaskois and Franco-Manitobans are descended from these emigrants from Quebec.

From the mid-1800s to the Great Depression, Quebec experienced the Grande Hémorragie ("Great Hemorrhaging"), a massive emigration of 900,000 people from Quebec to New England. French Canadians often established themselves in Little Canadas in many industrial New England centers like Lowell, Lawrence and New Bedford (Massachusetts); Woonsocket (Rhode Island); Manchester and Nashua (New Hampshire); Biddeford, Brunswick and Lewiston (Maine), and parts of Connecticut, among others. Of the 900,000 Québécois who emigrated, about half returned. Most of the descendants of those who stayed are now assimilated to the general American population, though a few Franco-Americans remain, speaking New England French.

Some tried to slow the Grande Hémorragie by redirecting people north, which resulted in the founding of many regions in Quebec (ex. Saguenay-Lac-St-Jean, Val-d'Or, etc.) but also in Northeastern Ontario. The northeastern Franco-Ontarians of today, which are primarily concentrated in Timmins, Hearst, Moosonee and Sault Sainte Marie, among others, are the descendants of emigrants from Quebec who worked in the mines of the area.

In recent times, Québécois snowbirds often migrate to southern Florida during the winter, resulting in the emergence of temporary "Québécois regions" there. Three Desjardins branches exist in Florida to assist Québécois snowbirds.

== Regional cultures ==
Quebec's 17 administrative regions each have their own quirks. Inside of these administrative regions, there can often be other regions with their own character (ex. Magdalen Islands in Gaspésie–Îles-de-la-Madeleine, Nunavik in Nord-du-Québec, etc.) as well as cities with their own personality (ex. Québec, Montréal, etc.).

=== Beauce ===
A region of small towns and farmland south of Quebec City, its people have a strong regional identity connected with the area's long history. Some of the earliest settlements of New France were in this region.

=== Côte-Nord ===
The large Côte-Nord region borders the northern stretch of the Saint Lawrence River. Its small-sized municipalities mainly concern themselves with the exploitation of natural resources via forestry, mining, hydroelectricity and fishing. The region is home to the famous "eye of Quebec", the massive submerged crater of Manicouagan Reservoir.

=== Eastern Townships (Estrie) ===
This southeast region is located along the Canada–United States border (Vermont, New Hampshire, and Maine). It was influenced during the 19th century by American loyalists who settled there. Its main city is Sherbrooke and the region is also well known for its skiing centres (Orford, Sutton, Owl's Head, all part of the Appalachian mountains).

=== Gaspé ===
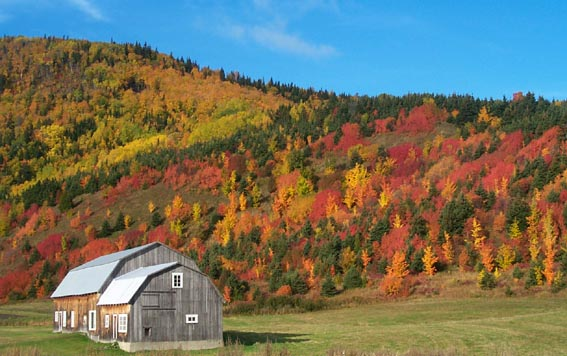
Autumn in Gaspé.

The Gaspé Peninsula (Gaspésie in French) borders on the Maritimes and shares its maritime culture. Acadians are a majority in many towns close to New Brunswick such as Bonaventure, and some Québécois Gaspesians living in those towns have an accent very close to that of their Acadian neighbours.

The culture of the Gaspé is very much based on the sea. Tourist attractions include the shrimp industry and salmon pass of Matane, regional food, coastal scenery, the Percé Rock, and the Chic-Choc section of the Appalachian Mountains.

=== Montreal ===
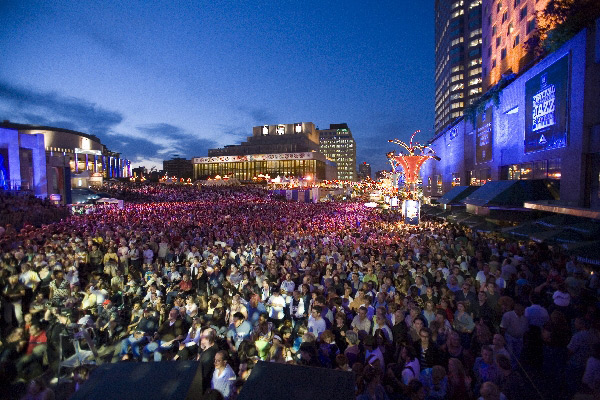
The Montreal International Jazz Festival audience fills the street, 2008.

Montréal, Quebec's largest city, is the second largest French-speaking city in the Western World after Paris. The city is known for its culture, festivals, cuisine, and shopping. Montreal also has a large English-speaking and allophone population. Most immigrants to Quebec settle in Montreal, and many come from French-speaking nations.

=== Outaouais ===
A local accent is characteristic of the people of Outaouais in western Quebec. The region includes some predominantly English-speaking villages such as Wakefield (which is part of the La Pêche municipality), but it is generally French-speaking. The city of Gatineau lies across the Ottawa River from the city of Ottawa, and many people in the area are employed with the federal government.

=== Quebec City ===
Quebec City, the provincial capital (albeit dubbed La capitale nationale, national capital, in French), is best known as the first permanent settlement and the only fortified city in North America north of Mexico. The old city, partially encircled within the centuries-old walls, is often said to have a European flair.

=== Saguenay–Lac-St-Jean ===
A region known for its blueberries, its tourtière which is a kind of a stew inside crust, its soupe aux gourganes and other specialties, Saguenay–Lac-Saint-Jean is also the birthplace of many of Quebec's public figures such as former Quebec premier Lucien Bouchard, singer Mario Pelchat and Olympic athlete Marc Gagnon. The accent of this region is one of the most distinctive ones found in Quebec. The region hosts many festivals during summertime and receives many tourists.

This area is sometimes considered the heartland of the Quebec sovereigntist movement.

== See also ==
- Culture of Canada
- Durham Report
- List of festivals in Quebec
- List of provincial and territorial nicknames in Canada
