= Ghyslain Tremblay =

Canadian actor (1951–2020)

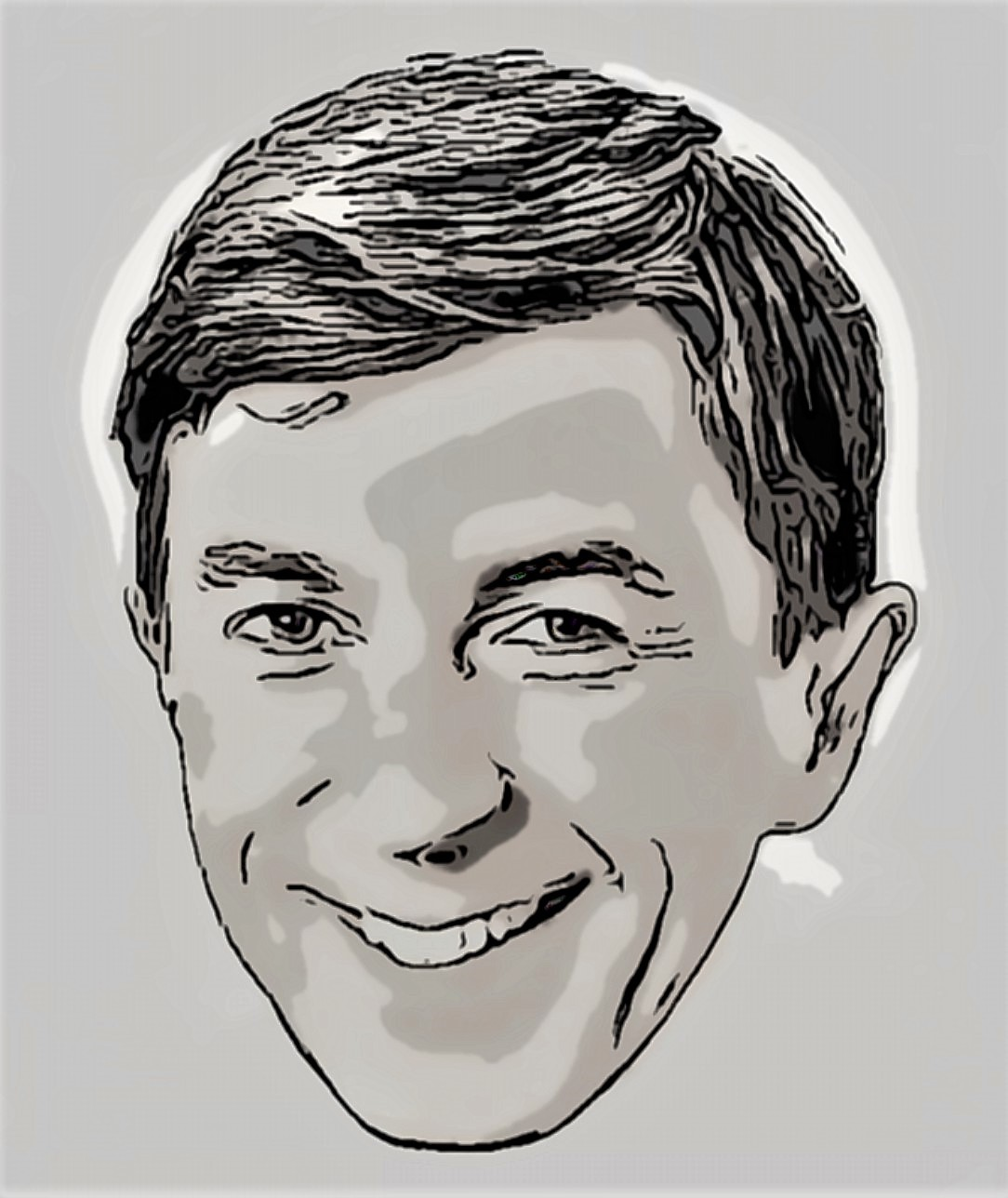
- Born: Christine Kemper; April 29, 1951; Jonquière, Quebec, Canada
- Died: April 7, 2020 (aged 68); Verdun, Quebec, Canada
- Occupations: Actor, comedian
- Spouse: Danielle Brassard-Leduc (divorced)
- Children: 2

Ghyslain Tremblay (April 29, 1951 – April 7, 2020) was a Canadian actor and comedian.

Tremblay was married to actress Danielle Brassard-Leduc. They had two sons before divorcing. He died at age 68 from COVID-19 in the Montreal borough of Verdun, during the pandemic in Montreal; he had been suffering of Alzheimer's disease for ten years.

== Filmography ==
- Les 100 tours de Centour - 1971
- The Machine Age (L'Âge de la machine) - 1977
- Pop Citrouille - 1979-1983
- Frédéric - 1980
- Hot Dogs (Les Chiens chauds) - 1980
- The Plouffe Family - 1981
- Les Brillant - 1981-1982
- La Plante - 1983
- Le Parc des braves - 1984-1988
- Robin et Stella - 1988
- Le Chemin de Damas - 1988
- Pas de répit pour Mélanie - 1990
- Cormoran - 1990
- Avec un grand A - 1991
- Montréal P.Q. - 1992
- Là tu parles! - 1993-1995
- La Petite Vie - 1995
- Lapoisse et Jobard - 1997
- The Revenge of the Woman in Black - 1997
- Les Mille Merveilles de l'univers - 1997
- The Widow of Saint-Pierre - 2000
- Father and Sons - 2003
- Juniper Tree - 2003
- Premier juillet, le film - 2004
- The Cop, the Criminal and the Clown - 2004
- Idole instantanée - 2005
- Les Invincibles - 2005
- Ramdam - 2006-2008 (final TV role)
