= Roman du terroir =

Québécois literary movement

The roman du terroir (rural novel) was strongly present in French Quebec literature from 1846 to 1945. It had as its goal the celebration of rural life during a period of rapid industrialization. The clergy and the state encouraged this type of literature; in fact, the moral conservatism of the roman du terroir "contrasts starkly" with the trends in the literature of France at the time. The Québécois establishment were hoping that support for this type of novel would strengthen Québécois morality, and perhaps halt an exodus of French Québécois from rural farming areas to Montreal and the textile factories of New England.

== Values ==
The moral mission of the romans du terroir was set out by Abbé Casgrain, a member of the École patriotique (fr). The novels emphasized four prominent values:

1. the rural homestead (agriculture),
2. the family,
3. the language, and
4. religion.

The novels idealized a bond with the homestead and farm life. The healthier "natural" life of the farm was contrasted with the decadence of the city. Above all, this type of novel revolved around continuity, traditions, and the passing down of values. Patrice Lacombe's (fr) The Paternal Farm (1846) is considered the first of this type of novel. The most popular example is Maria Chapdelaine by Louis Hémon, which was widely translated and became well-known across Canada during the early 20th century. Trente arpents (1938) by Ringuet is another notable example.

The roman du terroir more or less disappeared during the 1940s, when novels about urban life became widely read, such as those by Gabrielle Roy and André Langevin (fr); Germaine Guèvremont is generally considered to be the last influential writer of romans du terroir during this period of transition.

== Anti-terroir ==
Traces of the influence of the roman du terroir can be found in Québécois literature and culture today, sometimes nostalgic.

At the same time, many novels are written in reaction against the roman du terroir style, maintaining the rural setting but exposing the sordid side of life in the countryside that was often culturally and economically impoverished.

Among the "anti-terroirs" are Un Homme et son péché by Claude-Henri Grignon, La Scouine by Albert Laberge and Une saison dans la vie d'Emmanuel by Marie-Claire Blais. The novel Marie Calumet (fr), by Rodolphe Girard (fr), while sometimes being considered a typical example of the roman du terroir, also possesses some characteristics of the "anti-terroir". In effect, Girard lightly mocks the clergy in the novel.

== See also ==
- Mon oncle Antoine, coming of age in rural Quebec
