= 1940 Governor General's Awards =

Canadian literary award

The 1940 Governor General's Awards for Literary Merit were the fifth rendition of the Governor General's Awards, Canada's annual national awards program which then comprised literary awards alone. The awards recognized Canadian writers for new English-language works published in Canada during 1940 and were presented in 1941. There were no cash prizes.

There was one award in each of three established categories, which recognized English-language works only.

== Winners ==
- Fiction: Ringuet, Thirty Acres
- Poetry or drama: E. J. Pratt, Brébeuf and His Brethren
- Non-fiction: J. F. C. Wright, Slava Bohu
