= Thirty Acres =

1938 novel by Ringuet

- Title page for Thirty Acres (English language edition, 1940)
- Author: Ringuet
- Original title: Trente arpents
- Translator: Felix Walter, Dorothea Walter
- Language: English
- Genre: fiction
- Publication date: 1938 (French); 1940 (English); 1940 (German)
- Publication place: Canada
- Media type: Print (hardback & paperback)

Thirty Acres (French: Trente arpents) is a novel by Canadian writer Philippe Panneton, published under the pen name Ringuet. First published in French in 1938, it was published in an English translation in 1940 and won the Governor General's Award for Fiction at the 1940 Governor General's Awards. It is considered one of the most important works in Quebec literature, and one of the most important exemplars of the roman du terroir genre.

The novel traces the life of Euchariste Moisan, a rural farmer in Quebec.

The novel's English edition remains in print as part of the New Canadian Library series.
