= Garihanna Jean-Louis =

- Born: September 20, 1989 (age 36); Montréal, Québec
- Education: Université de Montréal - l'École nationale de l'humour
- Notable work: Les Traces du Passé (2014) - Traits d’humour (2016) - Bye-Bye (2020) - Montreux Comedy (2023) - Johanne, Tout Simplement (2024) - Lakay Nou (2026)
- Awards: Comedian of the Year at Gala Dynastie (2024) - Artist of the Year at Zoofest (2022) - Prix Gémeaux (2021) - Public Choice Award at Gala Dynastie (2020) - Revelation of the Year at the Festival International du Rire Lol Fest Haïti (2017 and 2018)

Garihanna Jean-Louis (born September 20, 1989) is a Haitian-Canadian comedian,actress and writer. She is the first Black female comedian to graduate from l’École nationale de l’humour in Montreal, Québec, Canada.

== Early life ==
Born in Montreal in 1989, Garihanna Jean-Louis went back and forth between Montreal and Haiti for most of her early life.

At age 5, she moved to Haiti.

At age 15, she returned to Montreal without her family due to the political instability, namely the 2004 Haitian coup d'état.

Still a teenager, Jean-Louis went back to Haiti after becoming frustrated with all the prejudices she faced.

At age 18, her mother and sister were kidnapped. This kidnapping lasted 3 days and was by a perpetrator that the family knew. They ended up being unharmed, but the ordeal was enough to have her parents force her to go back to Montreal permanently.

== Education ==
Garihanna Jean-Louis got her bachelor's degree in economics and criminology from the Université de Montréal. After being in the police workforce for a couple years, she then went on to get a scholarship and degree from l’École nationale de l’humour in 2017.

== Career ==
=== Police cadet ===
After graduating from the Université de Montréal, she went on to work as a cadet with Montreal's police force, SPVM.

=== Actress ===
In 2013, she quit her job with the SPVM and moved back to Haiti after her father's sudden death. In Haiti, she actively pursued a career in acting. Garihanna Jean-Louis began acting at 5 in a professional theater company in Haiti. But, in 2013, she fully embraced her love of theatre, teaching at middle schools in Port-au-Prince.

=== Comedian ===
In 2015, her sister encouraged her to attend a Quebec comedy workshop, where she performed a skit about her bicultural identity and was selected to present that number at the gala Ha Ha Haïti in Montreal. Two hours before the show, the director of l'École nationale de l'humour, Louise Richer, offered her a scholarship on the spot to study comedy. Jean-Louis quickly accepted, uprooting her life and going back once and for all to Canada. This snap decision marked history, making her the first and only Black female comedian to graduate from this institution since its creation in 1988.

Garihanna Jean-Louis went on to have a career doing comedy galas, TV shows, and a movie. Now, she and her older sister, Cynthia Jean-Louis, lead workshops in acting and comedy to promote inclusivity and inspire young people from marginalized backgrounds.

== Awards ==
Artist of the Year at Zoofest in 2022.

The Prix Gémeaux in 2021

Public Choice Award at Gala Dynastie in 2020

Revelation of the Year at the Festival International du Rire Lol Fest Haïti in 2017 and 2018

== Filmography ==
=== Film ===
Les Traces du Passé (2014)

=== Television ===
Bye-Bye (2020)

=== Comedy galas ===
Traits d’humour (2016)

Montreux Comedy (2023)
