= Équipe Cycliste Cascades =

Cycling team based in Canada

Team information
- Registered: Canada
- Discipline: Road / Track

Key personnel
- General manager: Suzie Bélanger
- Team manager: Maxime Caron

Team name history
Jersey

Équipe Cascades was a women's cycling team based in Canada that competed in North American road bicycle racing and track cycling events. The Équipe Cascades also competed in UCI events.

== 2007 ==
=== Team roster ===
- (Canada) Véronique Labonté
- (Canada) Geneviève Gauthier
- (Canada) Johanne Cyr
- (Canada) Lila Fraser
- (Canada) Caroline Montminy
- (Canada) Jessica Burns
