= Cavalia =

Canadian equestrian show company

Cavalia Inc.
- Company type: Private company
- Industry: Entertainment
- Founded: 2003 (as Voltige)
- Founder: Normand Latourelle
- Headquarters: Montreal, Quebec, Canada
- Area served: Worldwide
- Key people: Normand Latourelle
- Number of employees: 500
- Website: www.cavalia.com

Cavalia is a company that specializes in the creation, production and touring of live equestrian shows. It was founded by Normand Latourelle and is headquartered in Montreal, Canada.

== History ==
Established in 2003 by Normand Latourelle under the name of "Voltige", the first performance was held in Shawinigan, Quebec. The company's original production, Cavalia: A Magical Encounter Between Human and Horse, has been touring since 2003. Odysseo, Cavalia's show, premiered in October 2011 in Laval, Quebec.

In May 2009, the Government of Canada provided Cavalia with a $4-million loan to Cavalia Inc. to develop new productions and construct a horse-training facility in Sutton, Quebec.

== First Production: Cavalia, A Magical Encounter Between Human and Horse ==
The first show is a tribute to the relationship between humans and horses throughout history. It is described as an equestrian ballet, it expresses a "dream of freedom, cooperation, and harmony". Riders, acrobats, dancers, and musicians share the stage with horses. A Magical Encounter Between Human and Horse features about 50 horses, 5 musicians, and 45 artists including riders, aerialists, and acrobats.

=== Performers ===
Many of the horses are Lusitanos, and the remainder are Andalusian horses, Canadian Horses, American Quarter Horses, Paint horses, Belgians, Percherons, Arabians, and Appaloosas. The show's horses were originally from Canada, France, Spain, and the United States.

The show also features a team of human international performers from Guinea, Canada, France, Kyrgyzstan, United States, Australia, Mexico, and Morocco, including acrobats, horsemen and horsewomen.

=== The Big Top ===
150 people work for the tent raising and site preparation. The installation lasts 12 days, while the removal is completed in three days. The tent is 30 meters (98 ft) high, the equivalent height of a 10-story building. 6,635 square meters (7,935 sqyd) of fabric is used to create the marquee that extends over an area of 2,440 square meters (26,264 sqft) . A screen of 70 meters (230 ft) serves as a backdrop for projections and multimedia effects. The stage is 50 meters (164 ft) in width, the length of an Olympic pool. 2,500 tons of sand, earth, and gravel, the equivalent of 100 trucks, are used to create the scene. The Big Top can accommodate up to 2,000 spectators. Cavalia's village includes nine tents: the White Big Top, a Rendezvous VIP Tent, Entrance tents, two Artistic tents, two warming tents, the Stable, and the Staff Cafeteria. Inside the Stable, the horses consume 40 bales of hay, 900 kg (1,980 lb) of grain and 20 kg (44 lb) of carrots during one run of the show.

== Second Production: Odysseo ==
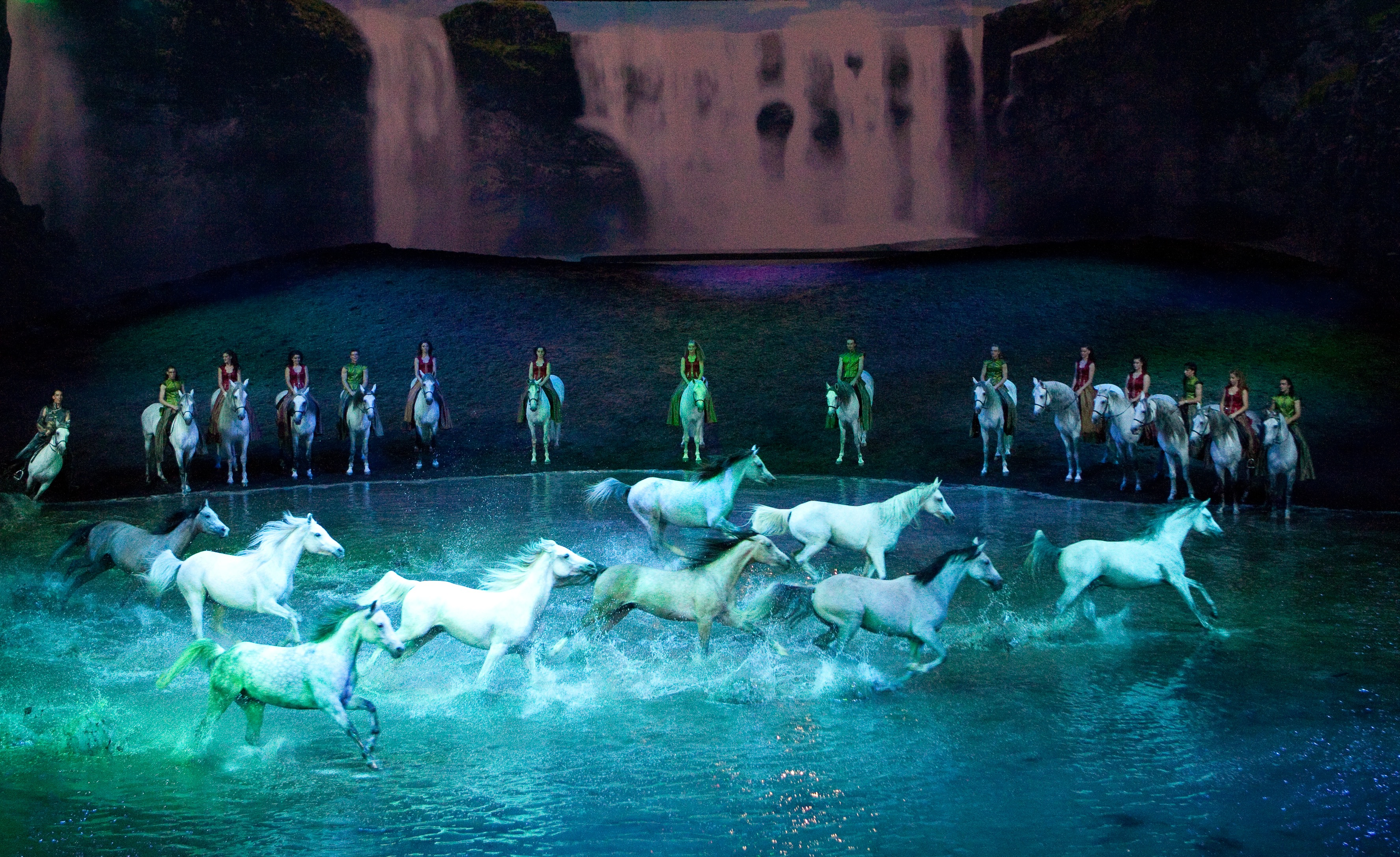

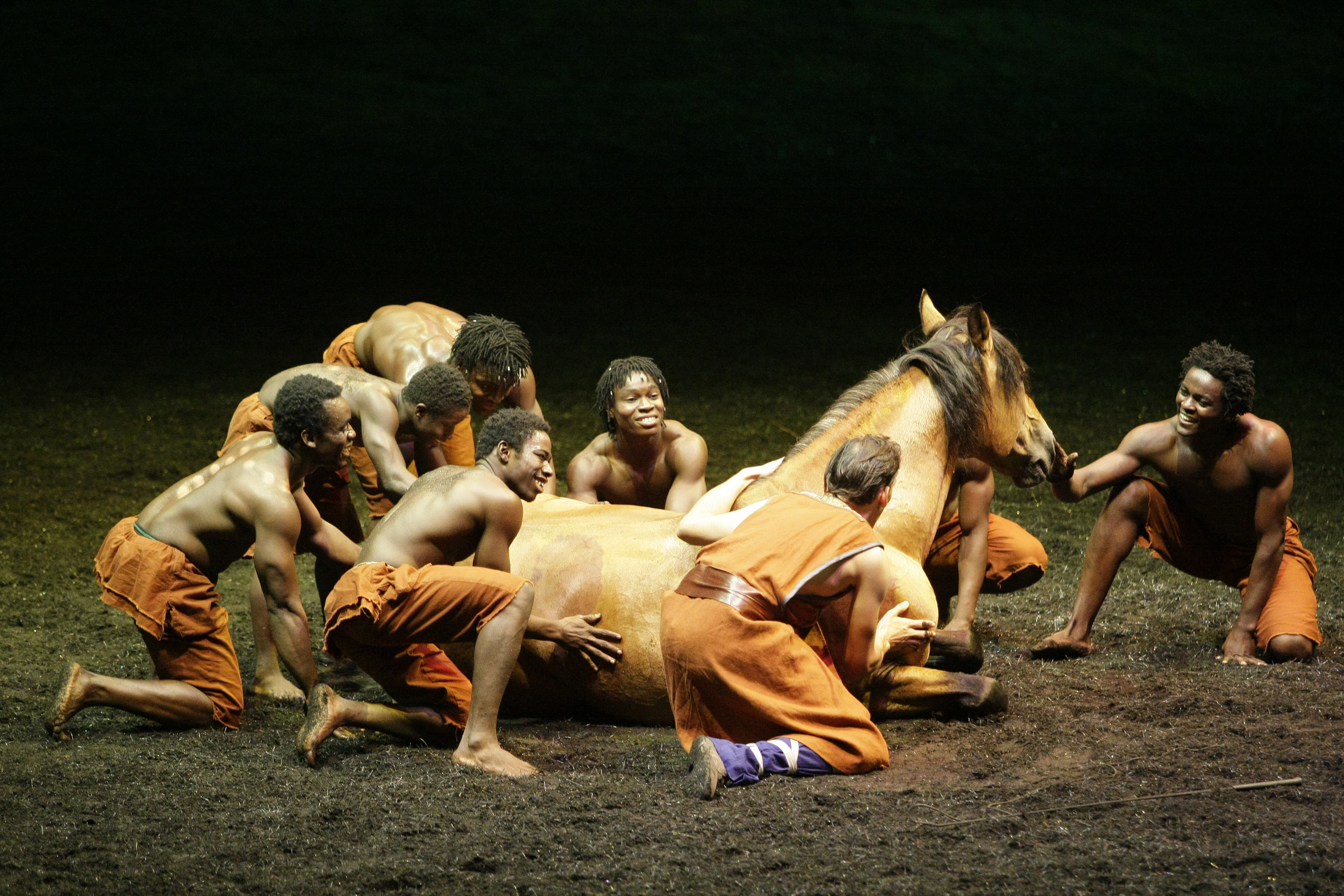

Odysseo was launched in 2011. Cavalia summarizes the show as depicting "horses and humans leaving together to meet a world between dream and reality by traveling through the great wonders that nature has offered, deserts, waterfalls, canyons, and glaciers." This second show portrays equestrian arts, acrobatics, music, multimedia projections, and special effects under one Big Top. It features some 300 different costumes. Non-riders do acrobatics and sing West African songs.

=== Odysseo's key players ===
- Normand Latourelle: President and Artistic Director
- Wayne Fowkes: Director
- Guillaume Lord: Set Design
- Geodezik: Visual Design
- Alain Lortie: Lighting Design
- George Lévesque and Michèle Hamel: Costumes
- Darren Charles and Alain Gauthier: choreography
- Mathieu Roy and Elsie Morin: Acrobatic Number Conception

=== The Big Top ===
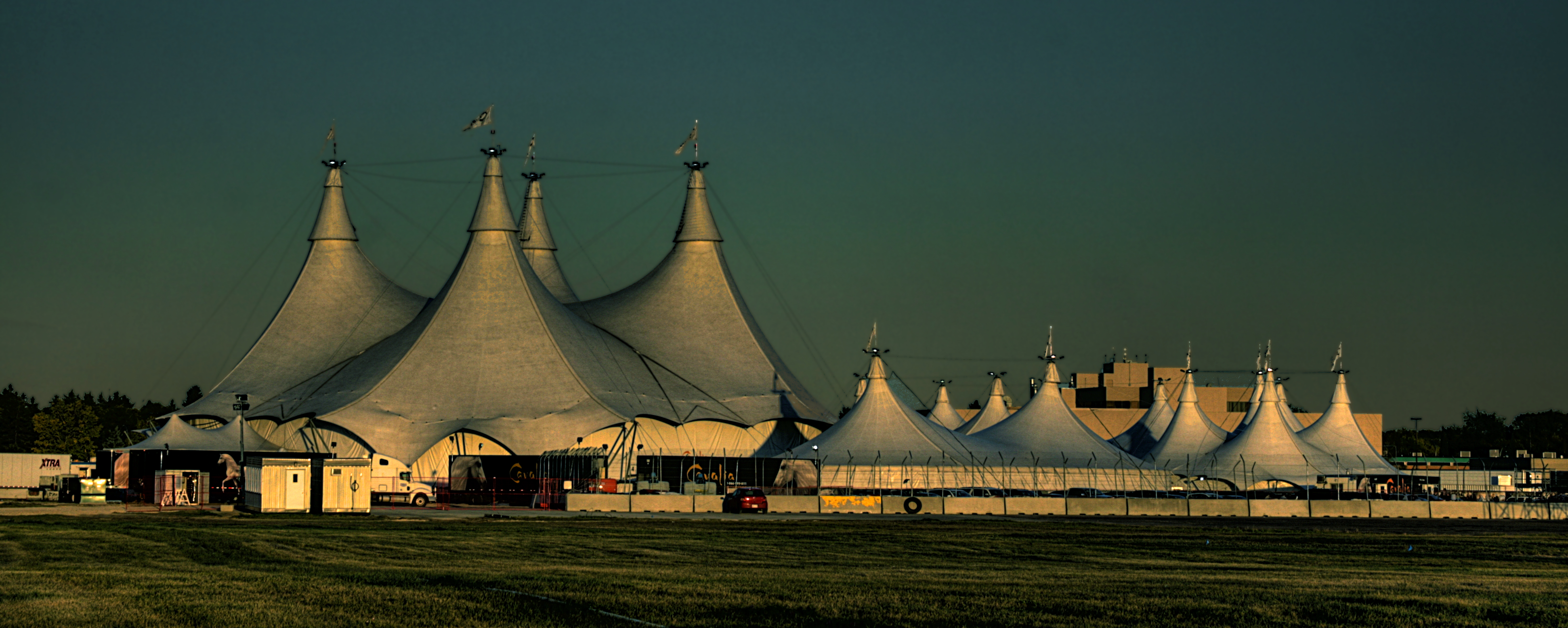
The Big Top in Edmonton (2012)

Like the first production's Big Top, Odysseo's tent was designed specifically for the needs of the show and the vision of its creators. It is two and a quarter times bigger than the first one and is (as of September 2013) the largest touring tent in the world.

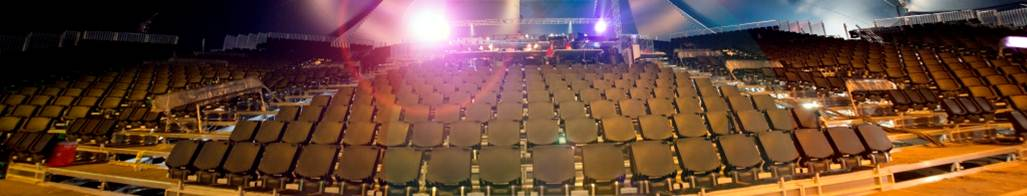
Odysseo

The exterior consists of four poles, four arches, and 2.1 square miles of canvas; is 38 meters (125 ft) high; measures 115 meters (377 ft) long and 65 meters (213 ft) wide; and occupies a surface area that extends over 120 meters (394 ft) in length and 95 meters (312 ft) wide. The interior is 2,500 square meters (26,910 sqft); composed of 6,000 tons of rock, earth, and sand; and has a seating capacity of 2,290 people.

Installation requires 40 motors and a mechanical crane; Each arch is composed of eight 9-meter (30 ft)-long sections. The arches rise to 27 meters (89 ft) and are 62 meters (203 ft) long; the painting is composed of 16 pieces; 1,310 piles and anchor points are used; 166 posts are required to assemble the walls of the tower; wiring has a length of 5.8km (3.6 mi); It takes 20 trucks to transport the tent.

Odysseo ended its tour with a six-week Montreal run, concluding in August 2018
