= Soupe aux gourganes =

Fava bean soup from Quebec

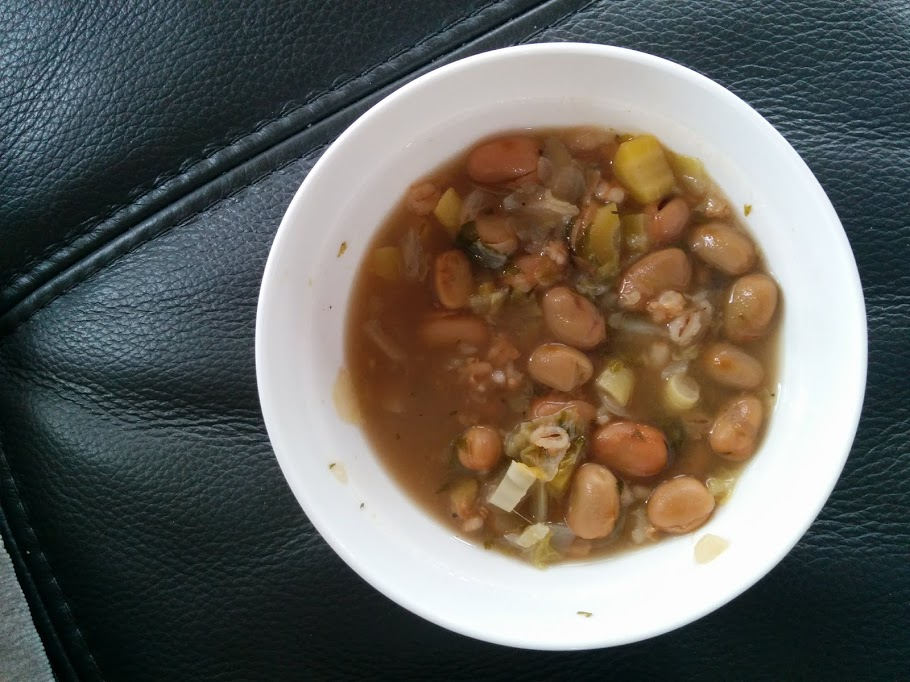
Soupe aux gourganes

Soupe aux gourganes is a dish from Quebec's traditional cuisine made with gourgane beans. The gourgane bean is a strain of fava bean that is produced in Quebec. Although it is not widely cultivated in Quebec today, it has been present there since the beginnings of the colonization of New France and soupe aux gourgane remains an emblematic food of the Charlevoix and Saguenay–Lac-Saint-Jean regions. This very hearty soup is often eaten as a main dish.

== Ingredients ==
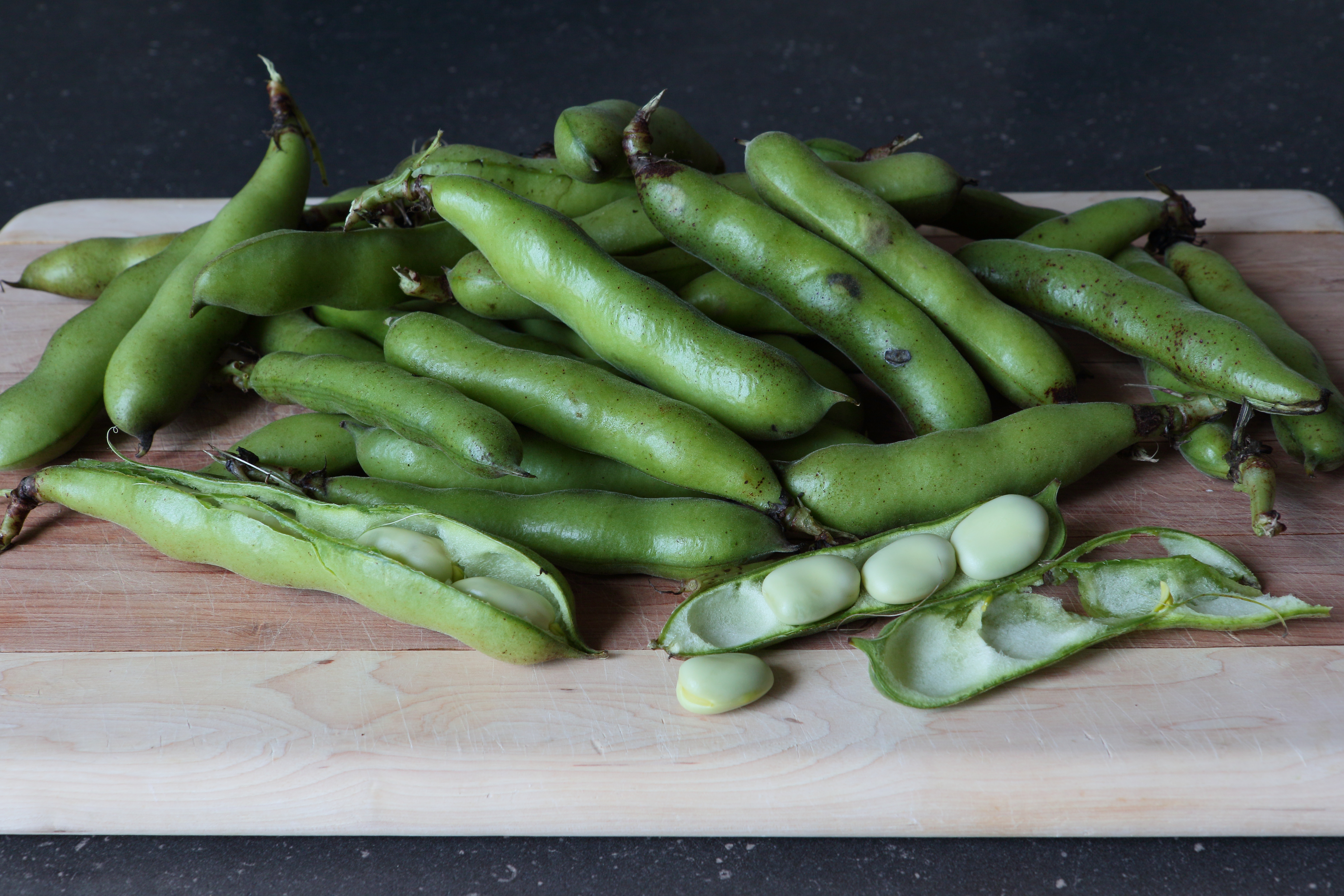
Gourganes from a greenhouse

Soupe aux gourganes is traditionally made with broth made from beef shanks, salted bacon in which freshly de-shelled gourganes are cooked along with a few cleaned shells, pearl barley, carrots, fat cabbage (also called fat chicken), tomato and vermicelli. Finally, it is seasoned with savory and chives. There are several variations that exist which incorporate other vegetables and/or seasonings. Which variations one can find depends on the region one finds themselves in.
