= Albert Laberge =

Albert Laberge (1871-1960) was a Québécois author and journalist.

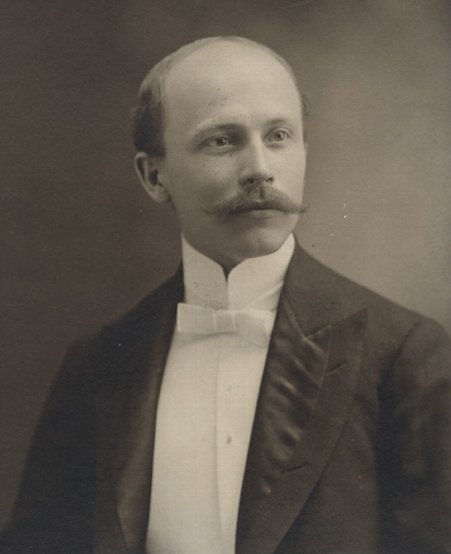
Albert Laberge was a Québécois author and journalist.

== Early life ==
Albert Laberge was born on 18 February 1871 in Beauharnois, Quebec, to Pierre Laberge and Marie-Joséphine Boursier. He went to the Académie Saint-Clément before attending Collège Sainte-Marie in Montreal. After studying law in 1894, he began working at the newspaper, La Presse, in 1896, and worked as a journalist there until 1932.

== Career ==
In 1918, Laberge published La Scouine (fr), which was censured by clergy for its portrayal of traditional Québécois themes. Other than newspaper articles, he would go on to publish collections of stories, prose-poems, essays, some literary criticism, as well as an unfinished autobiographical novel.

Laberge was also an art collector and critic. He died in 1960.

== Selected publications ==
- La Scouine (1918)
- La femme au chapeau rouge (1947)
- Les noces d'or (1950)
- La Rouille (1950)
- Le dernier souper (1952)
- Madame Pouliche (1963)
