= Philippe Panneton =

Canadian physician, academic, diplomat and writer

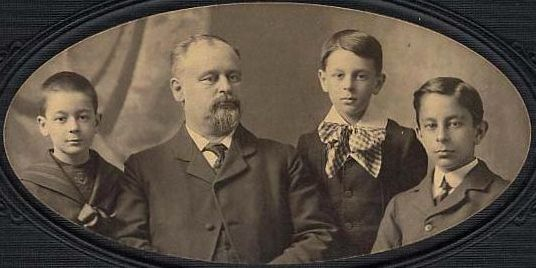
- Panneton (left) as a boy, c. 1904 with his father and brothers.
- Born: April 30, 1895; Trois-Rivières, Quebec
- Died: December 28, 1960 (aged 65); Lisbon, Portugal
- Resting place: Notre Dame des Neiges Cemetery
- Spouse: France Leriger (1895-1990)
- Writing career
- Pen name: Ringuet
- Notable work: Thirty Acres

Philippe Panneton (or Joseph-Philippe Panneton, pseudonym Ringuet, which was his mother's maiden name; April 30, 1895 – December 28, 1960) was a Canadian physician, academic, diplomat and writer.

Born in Trois-Rivières, Quebec, he received a degree in medicine from Université Laval in 1920. In 1935, he became a professor at the Université de Montréal. In 1944, he was a founding member of L'Académie canadienne-française (now known as the Académie des lettres du Québec) and served as its president from 1947 until 1953. In 1956, he was named ambassador to Portugal, and died in Lisbon in 1960.

In 1959, he was awarded the Lorne Pierce Medal.

== Selected works ==
- Trente arpents (Paris, 1938), winner of the 1940 Governor General's Award for fiction
  - Thirty Acres, Oxford University Press, New Canadian Library (1940). Afterword by Antoine Sirois, translated by Felix and Dorothea Walter
  - Dreißig Morgen Land. Ein kanadischer Roman. Transl. Franziska Maria Tenberg. Benziger, Einsiedeln [1940] (German)
    - Extraction: Gott die Schuldigkeit erweisen, in: Gute Wanderschaft, mein Bruder. Transl. Carl Scharfenberger. St. Benno, Leipzig 1986 (German)
- Un Monde était leur empire / Their Empire Was a World (1943)
- L'Héritage et autres contes / The Legacy and Other Stories (1946)
  - "The Heritage", translated by Morna Scott Stoddart, in Robert Weaver, Canadian Short stories, Oxford University Press, p. 82—First published in the Tamarack Review (1960)
- Fausse Monnaie / Counterfeit (1947)
- Le Poids du Jour / The Burden of the Day (1949)
