= Robin et Stella =

Robin et Stella was a youth TV show aired on Radio-Québec (now Télé-Québec) from 1989 to 1993 featuring France Chevrette as Robin and Lorraine Auger as Stella.

The main plot was split into stories which lasted three seasons. Robin et Stella was aired three times a week (Mondays, Wednesdays and Fridays).
