= Les 100 tours de Centour =

Les 100 tours de Centour is a 1971–1972 French language children's television show made in Quebec by Radio-Québec. Its stories revolved around Verbo, a genie with magical power who was trying to recapture Centour (another genie who had escaped from the same land as Verbo).

The show's main purpose was language acquisition, which was conveyed by the way Verbo would do magic: when he needed to perform a trick, he would ask his talisman (named "Memo") for a formula (always in the form of "it is a [subject], it is an [object], it is the [subject] of the [object]".) He would then close his eyes and repeat, asking the children at home to do the same.

Centour on his part would perform magic by reciting similar formulas while shaking his magic wristband (which looked like a gaudy wristwatch).

Verbo's constant companion was Picot Cotton, a young human male whose family was often the target of Centour's tricks.

== Cast ==
- Roland Chenail (Head of the genies)
- Julien Genay (Verbo)
- Yves Massicotte (Centour)
- Ghyslain Tremblay (Pico Coton)
- Madeleine Sicotte (Cybèle Coton)
- Camille Ducharme (Philibert Coton)
- André Montmorency (Galopé)
- Serge L'Italien
