= List of comedians from Quebec =

This is a list of Quebecers who have performed as comedians on stage, on television, or on the radio.

This list also includes Acadian humorists and Franco-Canadian humorists who have mostly worked in Quebec. These humorists are marked with an asterisk (*).

== A ==
- Marc-Antoine Audette (Justiciers masqués)

== B ==
- Rachid Badouri
- Alexandre Barrette
- Michel Barrette
- Michel Beaudet
- Michel Beaudry
- Emmanuel Bilodeau
- Claude Blanchard
- Bruno Blanchet
- Anne-Élisabeth Bossé
- Bowser and Blue
- Pierre Brassard (Les Bleu Poudre)
- Normand Brathwaite (Samedi de rire)
- Benoît Brière

== C ==
- Véronique Claveau
- Fabien Cloutier
- Véronique Cloutier
- Michel Côté (Broue)
- Michel Courtemanche

== D ==
- Gabriel D'Almeida Freitas
- Yvon Deschamps
- Clémence DesRochers
- Jacques Desrosiers (Patof)
- Véronic Dicaire*
- Ding et Dong
- Martin Drainville (Broue)
- Sébastien Dubé (Les Denis Drolet)
- André Ducharme (Rock et Belles Oreilles)
- Yvan Ducharme
- Mathieu Dufour
- Marc Dupré

== F ==
- Marc Favreau (Sol)
- Simon-Olivier Fecteau (Les Chick'n Swell)
- Denise Filiatrault

== G ==
- André-Philippe Gagnon
- Émile Gaudreault (Le Groupe sanguin)
- Cathy Gauthier
- Marcel Gauthier (Broue)
- Daniel Grenier (Les Chick'n Swell)
- Frank Grenier
- Olivier Guimond

== H ==
- Louis-José Houde
- Patrick Huard

== J ==
- Mario Jean
- Garihanna Jean-Louis

== K ==
- Anthony Kavanagh
- Eddy King

== L ==
- Pierre Labelle
- Marc Labrèche
- Léane Labrèche-Dor
- Mado Lamothe
- Bruno Landry (Rock et Belles Oreilles)
- Jean Lapointe (Les Jérolas)
- Gilles Latulippe
- Michel Lauzière
- Pierre Légaré
- Claude Legault
- Guy A. Lepage (Rock et Belles Oreilles)
- Doris Lussier

== M ==
- Norm Macdonald
- Peter MacLeod
- Martin Matte
- Claudine Mercier
- Jean-François Mercier
- Marc Messier (Broue)
- Claude Meunier (Ding et Dong, Paul et Paul)
- Dominique Michel
- Louis Morissette (Les Mecs comiques)

== N ==
- Michel Noël

== O ==
- Rose Ouellette (La Poune)

== P ==
- Laurent Paquin
- Yves P. Pelletier (Rock et Belles Oreilles)
- François Pérusse
- Martin Petit (Les Bizarroïdes)
- Arthur Petrie*
- La Poune
- Brigitte Poupart (Les Zapartistes)

== R ==
- Caroline Rhea
- Judi Richards
- Rock et Belles Oreilles
- Stéphane Rousseau
- Stéphane E. Roy (Les Bizarroïdes)

== S ==
- Sugar Sammy
- Derek Seguin

== T ==
- Serge Thériault (Ding et Dong, Paul et Paul)
- Denis Trudel (Les Zapartistes)
- Sébastien Trudel (Justiciers masqués)

== W ==
- Mike Ward
