= Piment Fort =

Canadian television series

Piment Fort is a Quebec humoristic game show hosted by Normand Brathwaite which aired on TVA from 1993 to 2001. Piment Fort means "hot pepper" in French.

A revival of the show had been announced as part of TVA's 2016 Winter TV season.

== Overview ==
The show's concept was to invite three humorists a week and to make them participate in a variety of games which led them to crack jokes and tell funny stories.

The show was recorded in front of a live audience in Montreal's Café Campus. After each game, the audience was asked to vote for the player who made the best joke or story. The winning player received a hot pepper as a trophy. If the vote was close, each player received a pepper.

== List of games ==
This is a list of games played on the show. Each game was associated with a different hat worn by the host and decorated according to the game's theme.

- Les mots croisés (The Crosswords)

A crossword game. This game was played once a week and always on Friday. The crossword theme changed each week. The host asked real questions with real answers in order to fill the crossword board, but the players always answered with jokes. A real answer was answered once in the show history.

- Trouvez le mozus (Find the Schmuck)
- Ça rime en crime (It Rhymes a lot)
- Ils vont tellement bien ensemble (They go so well together)

Each player is asked to choose a famous person from a selected list and to choose six words from a different list, then the player tried to explain how the chosen words might be linked to the chosen famous individual.

- Conférence de presse (Press conference)

Members of the studio audience are tasked with asking the players personal questions.

- Les faux proverbes (The fake proverbs)

The host reveals the first few words of a fictitious proverb, after which each player tries to come up with a suggestion as to what such a fictitious proverb's concluding words might be.

- C'est quoi ton sigle?

The players try to come up with clever or comical suggestions as to what words the letters of an acronym given by the host might stand for.

- Qu'avez-vous à déclarer? (What do you have to declare?)
- Les béatitudes

The host asks the player to finish a sentence beginning with: "Bless (a famous person or a group of famous people)..."

- Au pied de la lettre

Each player is assigned with a different statement. The players have to read their statement, but they have to change a selected letter by another one. Example: change the "b" for "z." Each player has 30 seconds to read their statement.

- Devine la devise (Find the motto)
- Place aux poètes (Here are the poets)
- C’est quoi? C’est quoi?
- Vive la différence! (Long live the difference!)

The host asks the players what is the difference between two famous people.

- C'est meilleur en groupe (It's better in a group)
- À quoi tu penses? (What are you thinking of?)
- Les pieds dans les plats
- Ça rend sourd

Each player tries to identify a sound played for them.

- Mission impossible
- Fais ta prière
- Comme maman disait (As Mom said)
- On va-tu aux vues?
- Y ont l'tour
- L'avenir dans mes boules
- J'ai mon voyage

The host gives a fictitious scenario: a famous person has gone to a selected place. Each player has to imagine what this person did there.

- Avec des si... (With ifs...)

The host gives the beginning of a sentence which begins itself with the word "if." Each player is asked to finish the sentence.

- Fais-moi une ligne (Draw me a line)

Each player is shown an abstract drawing and is tasked with completing the drawing in their own creative way, followed by explaining the drawing's significance.

- C'est qui? C'est qui? (Who is it? Who is it?)

A guest star invited to the show is hidden behind a big board; the players attempt to discover the guest's identity based on clues provided by the host.

- Les simagrées

This is a game based on improvisation. Each player is secretly given a person, an animal or an event by the host. The player has to mime it and the other two players have to guess what the active player wants to tell them.

- La grosse légume (The big vegetable)

A guest star invited to the show is hidden in a hot pepper costume. The players have to ask questions to the hidden guest in order to discover his/her identity.

- Le sac sur la tête (The bag on the head)

The game begins as every player has a bag on the head. When it's his/her turn, one player puts off his/her bag and he/she discovers that everybody in the attendance has a bag on their head. There's a guest star hidden in the bag-headed crowd and the player has to put the bag of the head of every person he seeks in order to find the guest. Each player is given limited time and if he/she passes through his/her own time, it's another player turn to try.

- Le détecteur de mensonges (The Lie Detector)
- Strip tease
- Connais-tu l'histoire du gars (Do you know the one about the guy)

The most popular game of the show. Each humorist tells a joke or a hilarious story of his/her choice.

- Top secret

The host asks the players to tell what they think is the biggest secret kept by a famous person.

- Le début de la fin (The beginning of the end)

The host gives the beginning and the end of a fictitious story. Each part is completely different from the other. Player 1 has to tell the story by saying the beginning words already given and to go on with his/her own ideas during a given time. Then, player 2 has to pursue the story where player 1 left off. Player 3 pursues second player's part and has to end the story with the words given by the host before the game started.

== List of players ==
This is a list of humorists who have already participated in the show.

- Jean-François Baril
- Michel Barrette
- Réal Béland
- Mike Bossy
- Édith Butler
- Serge Chapleau
- Jacques Chevalier
- Alain Choquette
- Jean-Marie Corbeil
- Martin Drainville
- André Ducharme
- Jean-Michel Dufaux
- Chantal Francke
- José Gaudet
- André Gauthier
- Jean-Claude Gélinas
- Mathieu Gratton
- Serge Grenier
- Mario Jean
- Anthony Kavanagh
- Bruno Landry
- Sylvain Larocque
- Marcel Leboeuf
- Pierre Légaré
- Guy A. Lepage
- François Léveillé
- Peter Macleod
- Maxime Martin
- François Massicotte
- Martin Matte
- Mélanie Maynard
- Luck Mervil
- Michel Morin
- Louis Morissette
- Michel M'Pambara
- Guy Nantel
- Laurent Paquin
- Yves Pelletier
- Alex Perron
- François Pérusse
- Martin Petit
- Marie-Élaine Proulx
- Gildor Roy
- Richard Z. Sirois
- Ghislain Taschereau
- Mario Tessier
- Christian Tétreault
- Serge Thériault
- Dany Turcotte
- Mike Ward
