= Un gars, une fille =

Canadian comedy television series

- Logo, original version
- Created by: Guy A. Lepage
- Written by: Guy A. Lepage; Sylvie Léonard; Pascal Lavoie; Marie-Frederique Laberge-Milot; Bruno Landry; André Ducharme; Sylvie Bouchard; Chantal Francke
- Starring: Guy A. Lepage; Sylvie Léonard
- Country of origin: Canada
- Original language: French

Production
- Producers: Jean Bissonnette; Jean-Claude Lespérance; Luc Wiseman
- Camera setup: Single camera
- Running time: 26 minutes

Original release
- Network: Télévision de Radio-Canada
- Release: 1997 – 2003

Un gars, une fille (French pronunciation: [œ̃ ɡɑ yn fij], A Guy, A Girl) is a Canadian comedy television series created by and starring Guy A. Lepage and broadcast on Radio-Canada, as well as the title of its French adaptation on France 2. It was one of the most successful television shows in the province of Quebec, with a concept exported to more than thirty markets around the world. It was the first French-language Canadian television programme to be adapted in the United States.

The show spawned several international versions, most notably a French TV series of the same name, which characters appeared in a 1999 episode of the original series, "À Paris".

== Overview ==
A typical episode features several vignettes of the everyday life of a couple, with the camera mostly centred on them. Often other characters are cropped, giving the programme its unique visual style. The couple receives friends for supper, go to the convenience store, or leave on a trip, and sometimes get on each other's nerves. Their quirks, and loving bickering, provide much of the program's humour. The graphic design style associated with the original Un gars, une fille, which consists of a palette of pastel blue and pink, and rough lines and scribbles, as well as a logo with simulated printing mistakes and smears, has been imitated by most of the other versions, with the notable exception of the American version. The character names are often those of the actors, as in the first version.

The concept of Un gars, une fille began in the 1990s as a series of short segments featured on Besoin d'amour, a TQS network daily talk-show, hosted by Guy A. Lepage that ran from 1995 to 1996. Lepage, a veteran of the renowned comedy troupe Rock et Belles Oreilles (RBO), played one half of the couple along with Sylvie Léonard. The duo reprised their roles in what became Un gars une fille in 1997, a successful weekly 26-minute programme which spawned many adaptations. It was celebrated numerous times at awards presentations, notably winning the Gémeaux, Félix, and MetroStar Awards. It was also nominated twice at the American Emmy Awards. Produced by Avanti Ciné Vidéo, the show aired from 1997 to 2003 in its initial run, and continued in reruns afterward. 130 episodes were produced, which included about 4,000 scenes. The scriptwriting team included RBO members André Ducharme and Bruno Landry, as well as Sylvie Léonard herself. Yves P. Pelletier, also from RBO, has been featured onscreen. After the series concluded in 2003, Lepage went on to produce and host the hugely successful Tout le monde en parle, adapted from the eponymous French hit talk-show.

A typical visual style of many adaptations: a medium shot of the couple facing cropped-out secondary characters.

A standard episode is presented in three acts, each of which is split into five to seven scenes. Flashy pastel blue and pink graphics with squiggly lines follow punchlines and mark transitions, coupled with an upbeat percussive tune, and often a spoken Voice-over phrase summing up the previous segment. Appropriately, the show's publicity, and early video release covers, are often recognisable by the presence of those pastel blue and pink colours and askew lines, mimicking the graphics that separate the programme's scenes; traditionally, the colour blue is associated with boys and pink with girls.

The two main characters, "Guy et Sylvie", are named after the actors who play them. Guy likes to tease Sylvie on a variety of subjects and hates her mother. His father is remarried to a young, good-looking stripper, Mélanie, played by Mahée Paiement, and had a child with her. The attention the child receives makes Guy jealous, his father having spent little time with him when he was a child. Unlike Guy, Sylvie dreams of having a baby. She is jealous of Geneviève, Guy's sexy, and promiscuous, office colleague with whom he had a one-time affair years ago. She is also obsessed with cleanliness and resents Guy for being untidy. A curious running gag from the show involves Guy surprising Sylvie by grabbing her breasts from behind while shouting "Road Runner!", followed by the cartoon character's emblematic honking "beeb beeb" sound. While she ostensibly loves it, she pretended the exact opposite when it was obliquely brought up by Guy in front of her mother. This joke was developed on the set by the two actors. The last season saw notable developments: a marriage, and a trip to Vietnam to adopt a little girl.

== Adaptations ==
=== Albania ===
An Albanian version named Tenxherja-Kapakun (The Pot, the Lid) is produced by Top Channel with Urbanus Group, with half-hour episodes revolving around the main characters Bela (Elvana Gjata) and Romi (Romeo Veshaj). The series began airing on October 5, 2024.

=== Bulgaria ===
The Bulgarian version, known as Тя и той (She and He) aired from 2002 to 2005 on bTV. In 2007, the show moved to Foxlife and the fourth season began airing. The show was cancelled after the final (25th) episode of the season, ending with a cliffhanger. 96 episodes were produced during the show's Bulgarian run. Since then reruns are airing on Foxlife and bTV Comedy. Stefaniya Koleva stars as Sylvia, and Yulian Vergov plays Martin.

=== Canada (English version) ===
An English Canadian adaptation was created by the producer of the original show, Luc Wiseman of Avanti Ciné-Vidéo television production company. The main English Canadian networks CBC, CTV, and Global Television were not interested in the concept. Wiseman stated: "They were saying that it was not for the Canadian market, that it was too audacious". With the title A Guy & A Girl, it ended up airing on Women's Television Network (WTN), (now known as the W Network), a cable television specialty channel, and lasted for two seasons. Jeff Clarke played Mike, and Katherine Ashby was Susy; together they received a Gemini Award nomination for Ensemble Performance in a Comedy Program or Series at the 18th Gemini Awards in 2003.

=== Cyprus ===
Εγώ κι εσύ (Me and You) began airing in October 2010 on CyBC1, the Cyprus' public broadcaster's main television channel, and on the CyBC Video on Demand platform, in the format of one 35-minute episode each week. Following the original concept, it kept the actors' actual names: Marios is the guy (played by Marios Mettis) and Niovi is the girl (played by Niovi Haralambus). In the other half of the season Fotis is the guy (played by Fotis Georgidis) and Danae is the girl (played by Danae Christou).

=== France ===
The characteristic unstable line and smudge graphics at the beginning and end of the show, and in the middle of two scenes.

=== Greece ===
Σ' αγαπώ μ' αγαπάς (S'agapo m'agapas, English: I Love You, You Love Me) began broadcasting in Greece in 2000. Its format is weekly, 26-minute episodes, much like the original. Thodoris Atheridis plays Thodoris, the guy, and Dimitra Papadopoulou plays Dimitra, the girl, replicating the original version's concept of using the actors' first names for the characters.

=== Hungary ===
The Hungarian version of Un gars, une fille was called Szeret, nem szeret. It began airing in 2002 on TV2. According to IMDB, the format is 7-minute segments, much like in France. The guy is Brúnó, played by Szabó Győző and the girl is Brigi, played by Oroszlán Szonja.

=== Italy ===
The first Italian version of the programme was called Love Bugs, which is the international marketing name of Un gars, une fille. It ran on Italia 1 from 2004 to 2005 with the couple played by comedian Fabio De Luigi (already well known for his collaboration with Gialappa's Band) and Michelle Hunziker, a veteran of Zelig Circus. A second season, Love Bugs 2 aired from 2005 to 2006 with Elisabetta Canalis replacing Hunziker. The characters' names in both series are those of the actors, in the fashion of the original show. In the third season in 2007, Love Bugs 3, the couple was played by Emilio Solfrizzi and Giorgia Surina (MTV's Veejay). Because of low ratings, Love Bugs 3 was cancelled. Nevertheless, approximately 50 episodes of the third season were filmed and broadcast, much the same as the previous two seasons.

=== North Macedonia ===
The Macedonian version of "Un gars, une fille" is known under the name of Сашо и Сашка (Sasho & Sashka). It stars Biljana Dragicevik-Projkovska as Sashka, the girl, and Zoran Ljutkov as Sasho, the guy. It was broadcast in 2005–2006 on Macedonian Radio Television .

=== Poland ===
In Poland, Kasia i Tomek began broadcast on September 3, 2002, on the TVN network. The title refers to the first names of the characters, the Polish equivalents of the English "Kate" and "Tom". It starred Joanna Brodzik as Kasia, the girl, and Paweł Wilczak as Tomek, the guy. It won two Telekamery awards in 2002: one for best comedy series and one for Brodzik for best actress. There were 100 episodes divided into 3 seasons.

=== Portugal ===
The version broadcast in Portugal began in 1999 and was called Entre Marido e Mulher ("Between Husband and Wife"). The format was weekly 26-minute episodes, like the Canadian original.

=== Romania ===
The Romanian version is broadcast by Fox Life.

=== Russia ===
In Russia a version of the showed aired on TNT channel starting 2003 under the title Sasha + Masha (Russian: "Саша + Маша"). 125 episodes were filmed between 2003 and 2005. The show became a hit and remains popular, as of 2009. The lead actors are Elena Biryukova (Елена Бирюкова) and Georgiy Dronov (Георгий Дронов).

=== Spain/Mexico/Argentina ===
Spain's version of the programme is called El y Ella ("He and She"), with a format similar to France with 7-minute shows each day. It began in broadcasting in 2000. As with the original, the actors' first names were used for the main characters: Josep Julien is Pep while Cristina Solá is Cristina. ("Pep" is a pet name for Josep.)

=== Serbia ===
In Serbia and Montenegro, Andrija i Anđelka began broadcasting on October 5, 2015, on the Prva network and in Croatia on the RTL on January 15, 2016 . The title refers to the first names of the characters. It stars Anđelka Prpić as the girl and Andrija Milošević as the guy. The series aired for more than two seasons. The first, from 5 October 2015 to 31 December 2015, had 64 episodes. The second season aired from 29 February 2016 to 13 June 2016 and included episodes 65 to 148. The third season, episodes 148 to 156, was shown from 7 October 2016 to 28 October 2016. Those were the final episodes of the series. On February 1, 2017, the series premiered in Macedonia on Televizija 24 with the title Андрија и Анѓелка,

=== Slovenia ===
In Slovenia, channel Planet TV started broadcasting the first season of the series on 6 March 2016. It airs from Monday to Friday and on Sundays. The Slovenian version of the series is called Da, dragi! Da, draga!. The main two characters are portrayed by Lotos Vincenc Šparovec and Gorka Berden. The director of the sitcom is Ven Jemeršić.

=== Sweden ===
In Sweden, Två som Oss ("Two like Us") began broadcast on 11 November 1999 on the channel SVT 1. The actors are Per Svensson as Peter and Anna-Lena Hemström as the Lena. The format is similar to the Canadian with a 26-minutes show weekly

=== Turkey ===
In Turkey the series is called 1 Kadın 1 Erkek ("One Woman One Man") featuring Demet Evgar and Emre Karayel. The first season finished in June 2009 with 36 episodes that were aired on the TurkMax channel during Thursday prime-time, with each episode running approximately 27 to 28 minutes in length. Despite the series airing on a specialty channel, on a satellite network - Digiturk - that requires a subscription, its popularity among young viewers is increasing steadily thanks to viral marketing and the sharing of clips on YouTube and Facebook. In January 2012 the show was renamed 1 Erkek 1 Kadın ("One Man One Woman") and new episodes aired on Star TV.

=== Ukraine ===
The Ukrainian version of Un gars, une fille called Lesya + Roma (Леся + Рома) began broadcasting in 2005 on ICTV. It starred Irma Vitovska as Lesya, the girl, and Dmytro Lalenkov as Roma, the guy. It was the first comedy television series to be produced in the Ukrainian language. It aired on weekdays with an average rating of 2 million viewers.

=== United States ===
Entitled Lovebites, the American version began broadcasting on September 13, 2006, with comedian Paul Reiser as executive producer and writer. It was co-produced by Stuart McLean (founder of Content & Company) at JWT, the world's fourth largest advertising agency. While the original format was 26 minutes, the American version consisted of a season of 82 episodes of two and a half minutes each (which was not part of the original contract, see below). 65 should be seen on television while 17 will be available for computers and cell phones. It aired on the TBS cable television network on Tuesdays, Wednesdays, and Thursdays sometime in the slot between 11:00 pm and midnight, and on Friday morning in the slot between 9:00 am and 10:00 am. Lovebites stars David Julian Hirsh (a native of Montreal, Quebec, seen in CSI: NY and Naked Josh) and Lauren Bittner (seen in Law & Order: Criminal Intent and Third Watch). The characters, called Max and Katie, are about 25 years old, younger than the original Guy and Sylvie. Another notable difference with the original version is that the couple in Lovebites breaks the fourth wall and speaks directly to the camera.

Lovebites was the first time a Québécer TV concept was adapted for an American audience (Louis 19, King of the Airwaves (Louis 19, le roi des ondes), a movie, had already been remade as EdTV). Reiser is said to have been captivated by the series when it was presented to him by Michel Rodrigue, president of Distraction Formats, the Montreal-based international distribution company for Un gars, une fille. Rodrigue said: "The selling process has been long and complicated. It has been a very long time that we have been working on it". Creator Guy A. Lepage said that he thought the chemistry worked well between the two main actors. Nevertheless, he has stated his disappointment with the finished product, giving it a "2 out of 10". In his opinion, the problem did not lie with the acting, but with the length of the show (two and a half minutes long, as mentioned above), the sponsor, the broadcasting and the assembling. He summed it up by saying: "It's media concentration to the power of 1,000, like a super big TVA". (TVA is part of Pierre Karl Péladeau's Quebecor media conglomerate.) Sunsilk, a shampoo brand of Unilever's, was the main sponsor of Lovebites. As of 2006, Canadian and American producers are still caught up in a legal dispute, notably about the aforementioned short length. The initial contract planned a guaranteed minimum of seven minutes per episode.

=== Others ===
The concept of Un gars, une fille was also sold to producers in: Algeria, Argentina, Belgium, Bosnia, Cuba, Denmark, Germany, Indonesia, Israel, Latvia, Lebanon (Patricia Nammour - Issam Breidy), Mexico, the Netherlands, Romania, Switzerland, the United Kingdom, and many others, totaling more than thirty countries. Not all of these rights sales have resulted in a programme being produced.

== See also ==
- List of Quebec television series imports and exports
- List of Quebec television series
- Television of Quebec
- Culture of Quebec
- List of French television series
- Culture of France
