= Go West! A Lucky Luke Adventure =

2007 French animated comedy film

- Theatrical release poster
- Directed by: Olivier Jean-Marie
- Written by: Jean-François Henry; Olivier Jean-Marie
- Based on: Lucky Luke by: Morris; La Caravane; Morris and Goscinny
- Produced by: Marc du Pontavice
- Starring: Lambert Wilson; Clovis Cornillac; François Morel
- Edited by: Patrick Ducruet
- Music by: Hervé Lavandier
- Production companies: Xilam; France 3 Cinéma; Dargaud Média; Lucky Comics; Pathé; TPS Star; Cinecinema; Mikros Image
- Distributed by: Pathé Distribution (France); Alliance Vivafilm (Canada)
- Release date: 5 December 2007 (France)
- Running time: 90 minutes
- Country: France
- Languages: French; English
- Budget: €15 million
- Box office: $6 million

Go West! A Lucky Luke Adventure (French: Tous à l'Ouest: Une Aventure de Lucky Luke) is a 2007 French animated western comedy film directed by Olivier Jean-Marie and written by Jean-Marie and Jean-François Henry. Based on and serves as the series finale of the 2001–03 animated television series The New Adventures of Lucky Luke (which in turn is based on the Franco-Belgian comic series of the same name by Morris) and loosely based on La Caravane by Morris and René Goscinny, the film was produced by Xilam, France 3 Cinéma, Pathé, Dargaud Média and Lucky Comics, and was released theatrically in France by Pathé Distribution on 5 December 2007.

== Plot ==
In New York City 1880, the Dalton brothers (Joe, Jack, William and Averell) escape from a court trial regarding the Daltons' bank salesman cousin disgracing their name and plunder several banks across New York, while Lucky Luke hunts for them. Upon placing their loot of stolen cash in an empty wagon at Central Park, New York, which was in construction at the moment, and attempting to blend in with the crowd in order to avoid detection from the police, Averell unwittingly blows their cover in front of the police, resulting in a wild police chase across New York.

After the chase, the Daltons head back to Central Park in order to retrieve their loot, only to find more wagons with immigrants going to California. Lucky Luke arrives to captured the Daltons when Piotr, the leader of the immigrants from the wagon train, welcomes Lucky Luke and later on exposes their problem to them: They have 80 days to go to California and to take possession of their land, if not the developer, a man named Crook, having put 12 caravans in danger so that they do not arrive in California with his partner Bartleby, keeps the money paid in advance without the sale being made. With that in mind, along with Joe convincing him to help them just to stay and find the loot, Lucky Luke wants to take the safe route to California, but since the immigrants got 80 days to get there and the safe route would take about 6 months, he instead decides to take them through the unsafe route, which takes them through a small town called Hole Gutch, crossing the Deadly Desert of Death, and passing through the Indian tribe of the Crazy Wolves.

Among the other immigrants headed for California include a Chinese chef couple, a teacher with unruly children named Miss Littletown, a trash-talking driver for a pack of mules that transport the Daltons and a barber among others. Along the way, Crook and Bartleby sow traps in order to prevent the caravans from going to California, but to no avail. Crook then later on tries to help the Daltons escape, but Joe refuses until he finds the loot in the wagons. Later, Lucky Luke and the caravans stop at Hole Gutch, where they pick up some new immigrants who also want to go to California including Rantanplan. During this, after failing another attempt on freeing the Daltons, Crook drains the water for the settlers who were thirsty in the Deadly Desert of Death. Joe tries to make the settlers have a union against Lucky Luke but Averell does a crazy rain dance by accident, all because of a cockroach was in his shoe, even told three roaches how bad it was in Averell's shoe.

When they get close to California within 24 hours, Crook makes one final trick to blow up the old bridge between the canyon using a cannon from the circus, same one that he brought the gators from when he tried to stop Lucky Luke near the Missouri river which failed to see the gators turned into accessories. With the next bridge being far away for 6 days to travel, Miss Littletown suggested to turn the wagons into hot air balloons and fly over the canyon. With some of the wagons now in the air, almost for the furnal wagon, the water wagon, and the Chinese chef's wagon being made of ladies' underwear, Lucky Luke and the immigrants make it to California and take possession of their land, only to discover that they get the bad side of California, showing it to be an old gold mine. Realizing Crook tricked them and that he has made a dozen of settlers fail to get to California, the settlers plan to hang him high but before they do, Joe promised them some money they hid in their wagons earlier. However, Averell already found them after they picked up the other immigrants in Hole Gulch and hid the loot in their ball and chains. This changes Joe's mind but not the settlers.

The Daltons flee with their stock into the abandoned gold mine, resulting in a chase in the form of a roller coaster ride between the settlers, Lucky Luke, Rantanplan and Crook. Finally, after all of them leave the mine, while Lucky Luke saved Miss Littletown and her students, the Daltons are defeated by Luke but Crook arrived with a stick of dynamite, demanding to give them the loot of the Daltons in the balls. Suddenly, as Crook makes his escape, a mega explosion was caused by the dynamite now fetched by Rantanplan, destroying the loot the Daltons stole and allows the settlers to discover gold under the sold lands. The film ends with the Daltons, Crook and Bartleby being tied up and sent to justice by Lucky Luke into the sunset.

== Voice cast ==
Character	French	Québec	English
Lucky Luke	Lambert Wilson	Stéphane Rousseau	Marcel Jeannin
Rintindumb (Rantanplan)	François Morel	Yves Pelletier	Marcel Jeannin
Mr. Pierre (Monsieur Pierre)	Titoff	Philippe Martin	Marcel Jeannin
Edgar Crook	Edgar Givry	Guy A. Lepage	Marcel Jeannin
Harold Bartleby	Michael Lonsdale	Bernard Fortin	Marcel Jeannin
Jolly Jumper	Adrien Antoine	André Ducharme	Rick Jones
William Dalton	Alexis Tomassian	Guy A. Lepage	Rick Jones
Jack Dalton	Christophe Lemoine	Yves Pelletier	Rick Jones
Spike Goodfellow	Jean Piat	Yves Pelletier	Rick Jones
Piotr	Éric Metayer	Yves Pelletier	Rick Jones
Ugly Barrow	François Seiner	Bruno Landry	Rick Jones
Joe Dalton	Clovis Cornillac	André Ducharme	Mark Camacho
Crazy Wolf (Loup Cinglé)	Jacques Frantz	Bruno Landry	Mark Camacho
Mr. Tang (Monsieur Tang)	Éric Metayer	Yves Pelletier	Arthur Holden
Averell Dalton	Bernard Alane	Bruno Landry	Michel Perron
Miss Littletown	Dorothée Pousséo	Éveline Gélinas	Holly Gauthier-Frankel
Louise de Paname (Louisette)	Marie Vincent	Violette Chauveau	Lucinda Davis
Molly	Dee Dee Bridgewater	Dee Dee Bridgewater	Dee Dee Bridgewater

=== Additional Voices ===
- Yves-Robert Viala as New York Policeman
- Luc Boulad as Great Falcon/Cowboy
- Jacques Obadia as Circus Director
- Marc Alfos as Saloon's Tough Guy
- Sylvain Corthay as Judge
- Saïd Amadis as Prosecution Lawyer
- Alain Flick as Glazier
- Michel Vigné as Bartender/Sheriff
- Philippe Catoire as Train Conductor/Roger
- Julien Chatelet as Morris/René Goscinny/Pioneer
- Moncho Asto as Mariner
- Giuseppe Furia as Pizzaiolo/Pioneer
- Pierre Dourlens as Bartender
- Jean-Marc Pannetier as Bank Cissier
- Pierre Baton as Old Timer
- Jérôme Pauwels as Tiny Brain
- Jean-Michel Farcy as Police Officer

== Production ==
Approximately one-quarter of the film's animation was outsourced to the studio La Fabrique. The film was originally scheduled to be released in France on 25 October 2007.

== Video game ==
A video game based on the film was developed by Tate Interactive and published by Atari Europe in 2007 for the Nintendo Wii, Nintendo DS and Microsoft Windows.
