= Pierre Légaré =

Canadian humourist (1949–2021)

- Born: 2 June 1949; Sherbrooke
- Died: 5 October 2021; Saint-Jean-sur-Richelieu, Quebec, Canada
- Occupations: humourist; writer; psychologist
- Years active: 1978–2010

Pierre Légaré (2 June 1949 – 5 October 2021) was a Canadian humourist, writer, and psychologist.

Pierre Légaré was born on 2 June 1949, in Sherbrooke, Quebec. He received a degree in psychology from the Université de Sherbrooke and practiced as a psychologist before entering comedy in the late 1970s. He wrote for theater, television, and radio. His first solo comedy special, Recherchez Légaré, was released in 1989. He received a Guinness world record for Mots de tête, the "shortest broadcast in the world". Légaré died in Saint-Jean-sur-Richelieu on 5 October 2021.

== Biography ==
=== Studies and early career ===
Pierre Légaré completed classical studies at the Séminaire de Saint-Jean (now CEGEP Saint-Jean-sur-Richelieu) before obtaining a bachelor's (1972) and master's degree (1973) in psychology at the Université de Sherbrooke. His master's thesis initially focused on behavioral psychology. For ten years, he was a psychologist and consultant in the psychology of organizational development in schools in Saint-Jean-sur-Richelieu.

In 1977, he obtained a second master's degree and his thesis focuses on students in difficulty when arriving in high school, following the adoption in 1974 of a law from the Ministry of Education making the passage to high school compulsory for all 13-year-olds.

He wrote lyrics for his psychedelic musical group "Blanc Deuil" for which he is the guitarist.

=== Humour and writing ===
He started working in humour in the late 1970s, first as a scriptwriter for various radio and television programs, and theater, then as a writer for various artists, including humourists Rolland Magdane, Claudine Mercier, Michel Barrette, and singers Gilles Rivard, Lara Fabian, Richard Séguin, and Judi Richards.

He went on stage and did comedy from 1989 to 2000, producing four one-man shows, and participating in the ensemble cast "Les parlementeries" which parodied the proceedings of the National Assembly of Quebec.

Some of his quotes, aphorisms, and witticisms were published in three volumes in the early 2000s. The first volume is titled "Mots de tête", a wordplay between headaches ("Maux de tête") and "Words from the head" referring to the intellect. They are broadcast in the form of capsules, also named "Mots de tête", lasting a few seconds, in Quebec on the TQS TV network and in France on France Inter radio. Pierre Légaré thus won the Guinness record for the shortest television program in the world.

He is a key figure in humour with several appearances on television in shows such as "Piment fort" with Normand Brathwaite, which are increasing his popularity.

A production bringing together some of his texts was performed in France by François Rollin.

=== Volunteering ===
Pierre Légaré lent his name to several causes and got involved with young people. He was notably a spokesperson for the Depressive and Manic Depressive Association of Québec and for Opération Nez rouge. He was also the star of an advertising campaign for Quebec notaries.

=== Personal life ===
Pierre Légaré survived a bladder cancer diagnosed in 2007. "You are no longer in curative mode: you are in the palliative mode,” his doctor told him at the time.

In 2009, two years after this diagnosis, chemotherapy treatments and work on himself, Pierre Légaré agreed for the first time to speak publicly about his ordeal, on the program "Une pilule, une petite granule" on the Télé-Québec channel. He talked the following year on Josélito Michaud's show "On prend toujours un train pour la vie" (Radio-Canada) and "Tout le monde en parle" (Radio-Canada) with Guy A. Lepage.

These programs aroused a lot of reactions: the comedian spoke frankly about his experience of the disease and his questions about traditional medicine.

He died on 5 October 2021, at the age of 72 in Saint-Jean-sur-Richelieu.

He was married to Danielle Légaré and had three children. The comedian had left the public life for fifteen years.

== Works ==
=== Comedy shows ===
- 1989–1992 : Recherchez Légaré
- 1992–1995 : Légaré 2
- 1995–1997 : Guide de survie
- 1998–2000 : Rien
- 1999 : Les parlementeries

=== Books ===
- 2000 : Les Trois Premiers Coups
- 2001 : Mots de tête
- 2001 : Mots de tête persistants
- 2001 : Rien
- 2002 : Waiter! / c'est pas un siphon c'est mon frère
- 2003 : Mots de tête récurrents
- 2005 : Mots de tête incurables
- 2005 : Onze nouvelles humoritiques et autres recits plaisants (co-author)
- 2008 : Les parlementeries
- 2010 : Passe-bêtes et pense-partout (co-author)

=== Song lyrics ===
- 1978 : Quelle belle vie
- 1994 : Ça vient de loin (co-author)

=== Theater ===
- 1984–1985 : Waiter!
- C’est pas un siphon, c’est mon frère

=== Television ===
- Samedi de rire
- Ad Lib
- 1999-2002 : Mots de Tête

== Awards ==
- 1996: Félix Award for show of the year, for his third stand-up show "Guide de Survie"
- 1999: Félix Award for show of the year, for his fourth stand-up show "Rien"
- 1999: Olivier for best text at Le Gala Les Olivier, a ceremony which honors Quebec's top comedians
- 1999: Olivier for best monologue
- 1999: Olivier for the best stand-up comedy show
- 1999: Guinness Book of Records for the world's shortest television show
