= Anaïs Favron =

Canadian radio and TV host

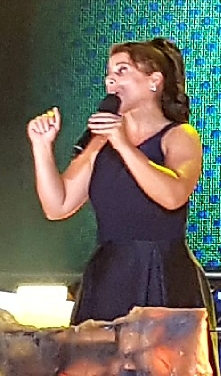
- Favron in 2018
- Born: January 11, 1977 (age 48); Saint-Octave-de-Métis, Quebec, Canada
- Occupation(s): Radio host, television host, actress

Anaïs Favron (born January 11, 1977) is a Canadian radio and TV host, actress, and improviser.

== Biography ==
Anaïs began her artistic career in television with small roles in the shows "Allô Prof", "Le bonheur est dans la télé" and "L'été c'est péché", but also with her remarkable participation in the show "Improvissimo".

She was drafted at the age of 20 into the ranks of the LNI (National Improvisation League) where she is still a star player today. After a certificate in film script writing, she decided to focus on theater and it was at UQAM's École Supérieure de Théâtre that she continued her training, where she developed a passion for directing.

After her studies, she joined the Kino movement, where she directed short films in addition to hosting evenings. She then founded the theatrical collective Cinplass, which has been presenting improvised shows since 1999.

In 2006 she hosted the youth TV show "L'émission jeunesse RDI" for which she was nominated for the Gémeaux awards gala.

In the summer of 2008 she was part of the production of the delirious comedy "Montcalm avant la tempête" written by Éric Fortin and directed by Stéphane Allard.

From 2009 to 2011, she co-hosted the show "Tout un retour" on CKOI, alongside Normand Brathwaite.

In fall 2012 she became the new host of the morning show "C’t’encore drôle" (Énergie Montréal 94.3) alongside Philippe Bond and Pierre Pagé, which became "NRJ le matin" (NRJ Montréal 94.3) in 2014, still with Philippe Bond, but also with François Morency this time.

She was a house actress in "Dieu merci!", star player of the LNI for more than 15 years and field host on the show "Juste pour rire en direct" (TVA) in addition to being one of the headliners of MAtv with the magazine GROStitres. We were able to see her as a columnist for "Un gars le soir" (V), collaborator at "Testé sur des humains" (TVA) as well as "C’est juste de la tv" (ARTV).

In 2013 she hosted "À faire en Grèce: la liste d’Anaïs" (Canal Évasion) as well as a 5th year of "En route vers mon premier Gala Juste Pour Rire" (MAtv) in the spring of 2014. In July, she co-hosted with Maxim Martin his first Just for Laughs Gala under the theme "opposite sex".

In 2015 she was at the helm of two new shows, "La guerre des puces" (Ztélé) and "100% Animal" (Télé-Québec), and was back for a fourth season of the youth show "Le dernier passager".

In the period of the COVID-19 pandemic, she hosted the program "L'école à la maison" with Pascale Morissette. She is also nominated for a Prix Gémeaux (Télé-Québec) for this last show. She also co-hosted a 2nd Just for Laughs Gala with Maxim Martin on the theme of "envy" in July and she was back in August 2016 on the radio for the program "ÉNERGIE le matin" (NRJ became Énergie again) from the end of August with Maxim Martin and Dominic Arpin.

She collaborated for 3 years on the program "Testé sur des humains", on TVA, in which she tested the limits of the human being.

We could see her in "Les 12 travaux d'Anaïs", on the airwaves of Canal Vie.

In 2021 she hosts the show "50 façons de tuer sa mère" in which she brings strong emotions to her mother by trying all kinds of activities and extreme sports.

On March 28, 2021, she co-hosted the television show "Tout le monde en parle", replacing Dany Turcotte.

== Radio ==
- "Tout un retour" with Normand Brathwaite, Sophie Prégent and Dave Morissette on CKOI-FM
- "C't'encore drôle" with Pierre Pagé and Philippe Bond on Énergie 94.3 Montreal
- "NRJ le matin" with François Morency and Philippe Bond on NRJ Montreal 94.3
- "ÉNERGIE le matin" with Dominic Arpin and Maxim Martin on ENERGY Montreal 94.3
