= Masked Avengers =

Masked Avengers may refer to:

- Masked Avengers (film), 1981 Hong Kong film directed by Chang Cheh
- Masked Avengers (duo), Canadian radio duo known for making prank calls
