= Samedi de rire =

1980s Canadian radio comedy show

Samedi de rire is a Radio-Canada sketch comedy show in Quebec that aired from 1985 to 1989. Cast members of the series included Yvon Deschamps and Normand Brathwaite. The québécois analogue to Saturday Night Live, the title is itself a clever play on words: it literally means "Saturday of laughs", but is phonetically pronounced similar to ça me dit de rire, or "I feel like laughing".

== See also ==
- List of Quebec television series
- List of Quebec comedians
- Television of Quebec
- Culture of Quebec
