= The Bossé Empire =

2012 Canadian comedy film

- French: L'Empire Bo$$é
- Directed by: Claude Desrosiers
- Written by: Yves Lapierre; Luc Déry; André Ducharme
- Produced by: Lyse Lafontaine; François Tremblay; Guy A. Lepage
- Starring: Guy A. Lepage; Claude Legault; Valérie Blais
- Cinematography: Martin Falardeau
- Edited by: Dominique Champagne
- Music by: Christian Clermont
- Production company: Lyla Films
- Distributed by: Alliance Vivafilm
- Release date: March 16, 2012
- Running time: 95 minutes
- Country: Canada
- Language: French

The Bossé Empire (French: L'Empire Bo$$é) is a Canadian mockumentary film, directed by Claude Desrosiers and released in 2012. The film traces the rise and fall of Bernard Bossé (Guy A. Lepage), a man who grew from humble beginnings to become the wealthiest man in Quebec by delving into absolutely every sector of economic activity regardless of whether it was legal or illegal.

The film's cast also includes Claude Legault, Valérie Blais, Magalie Lépine-Blondeau, Élise Guilbault, James Hyndman, Gabriel Arcand, Benoît McGinnis, Cynthia Wu-Maheux and Yves Pelletier.

The film was released to theatres on March 16, 2012. Marketing efforts for the film included the creation of a fake website for Bossé's corporate empire.

== Plot ==
The story of Bernard Bossé's social ascent, a worker's son who became a wealthy businessman, told in documentary form by a television film crew at the moment they are about to inject him with a fatal dose to end his vegetative comatose state in which he has been since an accident seven years earlier.

== Reception ==
The film was not positively received by critics, with François Houde of Le Nouvelliste writing that its chief weakness was in casting Lepage, a comedian rather than an actor, in the demanding lead role, while relegating the stronger actors in its cast to relatively one-dimensional roles.

It also fared poorly at the box office, making less money in its entire first two months of release than Paul Arcand's documentary film Driving to the Edge (Dérapages) had made just in its first week alone.

== Awards ==
The film received two Jutra Award nominations at the 15th Jutra Awards in 2013, for Best Hair (Ann-Louise Landry) and Best Makeup (Kathryn Casault).
