= List of Quebec television series imports and exports =

This is a list of Quebec television series imports and exports.

== Imports ==
Quebec remake	Original show(s)	Origin
Action-Réaction	Chain Reaction	United States
Atomes crochus	Match Game	United States
Le Bachelor	The Bachelor	United States
Le Banquier	Miljoenenjacht	Netherlands
Le Banquier	Deal or No Deal	United States
Caméra Café	Caméra Café	France
Le Cercle	Face Off	United States
Le Cercle	La Cible	France
La classe de 5^{e}	Are You Smarter Than a 5th Grader?	United States
Club sandwich	The Dean Martin Show (roast concept)	United States
La Cour en direct	The People's Court	United States
Dieu merci!	Thank God You're Here	Australia
Double Défi	Double Dare	United States
Drôles de vidéos	America's Funniest Home Videos	United States
En thérapie	BeTipul	Israel
L'épicerie en folie	Supermarket Sweep	United States
Facteurs de risque	Now or Neverland	Netherlands
Facteurs de risque	Fear Factor	United States
Fais-moi un dessin	Win, Lose or Draw	United States
Fort Boyard	Fort Boyard	France
Frank vs Girard	Kenny vs. Spenny	English Canada
La Fureur	La Fureur	France
Des gens pas ordinaires	The Surreal Life	United States
La Guerre des clans	Family Feud	United States
Les insolences d'une caméra	Candid Camera	United States
Jéopardy	Jeopardy!	United States
La Job	The Office	United Kingdom
Legendre idéal	The ? Show	Finland
Lingo	Lingo	United States
Lingo	Lingo	Netherlands
Loft Story	Big Brother	Netherlands
Madame, monsieur, posez votre question!	Question Time	United Kingdom
Madame, monsieur, posez votre question!	J'ai une question à vous poser	France
Ma Maison RONA	Dream Home	New Zealand
Mais où se cache Carmen Sandiego?	Where in the World is Carmen Sandiego?	United States
Le match des étoiles	Strictly Come Dancing	United Kingdom
Le match des étoiles	Dancing with the Stars	Various locations
Misez juste Price is Right : à vous de jouer!	The Price Is Right	United States
Pyramide	$25,000 Pyramid	United States
Qui dit vrai?	To Tell the Truth	United States
La roue chanceuse	Wheel of Fortune	United States
Le Sketch Show	The Sketch Show	United Kingdom
Star Académie	Operación Triunfo	Spain
Star Académie	Star Academy	France
Tout le monde en parle	Tout le monde en parle	France
Union libre des Amériques	Union libre	France
La vie rurale	The Simple Life	United States
La Voix	The Voice of Holland	Netherlands
Vingt-et-un	Twenty One	United States
Taxi payant	Cash Cab	United Kingdom
Taxi payant	Taxi Cash	France
Unknown title (in production)	The Apprentice	United States

== Exports ==
Quebec original	Non-Quebec remake(s)	Location
19-2	19-2	English Canada
Les Bougon : c'est aussi ça la vie!	Les Bougon : c'est aussi ça la vie!	France
Le cœur a ses raisons	Unknown title (in production)	France
Les détecteurs de mensonges	Unknown title (unknown production status)	Finland
Les détecteurs de mensonges	Unknown title (unknown production status)	Poland
Donnez au suivant	Unknown title (in production)	France
Donnez au suivant	Unknown title (in production)	Morocco
François en série	Serial Frank	United States
Un gars, une fille	Tia i toi	Bulgaria
Un gars, une fille	A Guy & A Girl	English Canada
Un gars, une fille	Un gars, une fille	France
Un gars, une fille	Sagapo, magapas	Greece
Un gars, une fille	Szeret, nem szeret	Hungary
Un gars, une fille	Love Bugs	Italy
Un gars, une fille	Kasia i Tomek	Poland
Un gars, une fille	Entre Marido e Mulher	Portugal
Un gars, une fille	El y Ella	Spain
Un gars, une fille	Bir Kadın Bir Erkek	Turkey
Un gars, une fille	Love Bites	United States
Un gars, une fille	Over 30 adaptations	Various locations
The Mad Dash	Duety do Mety	Poland
Piment fort	Unknown title (unknown production status)	Denmark
Piment fort	Unknown title (unknown production status)	Sweden
Piment fort	Unknown title (unknown production status)	United Kingdom
Rumeurs	Rumours	English Canada

== See also ==
- EdTV (an American remake of the Quebec film Louis 19, King of the Airwaves (Louis 19, le roi des ondes))
- List of Quebec television series
- Television of Quebec
- Culture of Quebec
