= Isabelle Cyr =

Canadian actress and singer

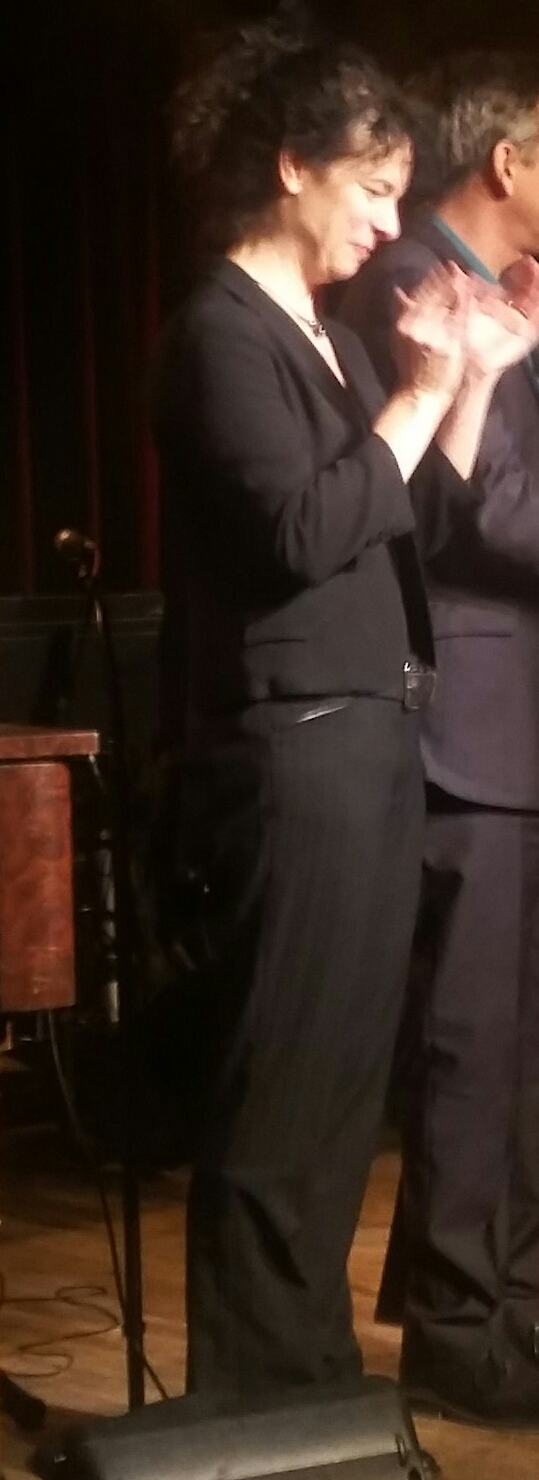
- Born: Moncton, New Brunswick, Canada
- Occupations: Actress and singer
- Years active: 1980s–present
- Spouse: Yves Marchand

Isabelle Cyr is a Canadian actress and singer from Moncton, New Brunswick. She is most noted for her performance as the title character in the 1996 film, Karmina, for which she received a Genie Award nomination for Best Actress at the 18th Genie Awards, in 1997.

Cyr first became widely known for her ongoing role in the television drama series Chambres en ville. Her other credits have included roles in the films like, Malarek, Nelligan, Karmina 2, The Hidden Fortress (La Forteresse suspendue), Savage Messiah (Moïse, l’affaire Roch Thériault), Love and Magnets (Les Aimants), 3 Needles, My Aunt Aline (Ma tante Aline) and Fear of Water (La peur de l'eau), and the television series, Ramdam, Rumeurs, Nos étés, 30 vies and Conséquences.

As a singer, she released her self-titled debut album in 2008, on Les Disques Spectra. She followed up in 2011, with Pays d'abondance, an album recorded as a duo with her husband Yves Marchand, and in 2019, with Brûle sur mes lèvres.

Her sister is actress, Myriam Cyr.
