= Don't Push It (film) =

1975 Canadian film

- French: Pousse mais pousse égal
- Directed by: Denis Héroux
- Written by: Marcel Gamache
- Produced by: Claude Héroux
- Starring: Gilles Latulippe; Celine Lomez; Yves Létourneau
- Cinematography: Bernard Chentrier
- Edited by: Yves Langlois
- Music by: Lee Gagnon
- Production companies: Cinévidéo; France Film; Télé Capitale Ltée
- Distributed by: France Film
- Release date: February 7, 1975
- Running time: 93 minutes
- Country: Canada
- Language: French

Don't Push It (French: Pousse mais pousse égal) is a Canadian comedy film, directed by Denis Héroux and released in 1975. The film stars Gilles Latulippe as Conrad Lachance, a clumsy young man who has trouble keeping a job; his girlfriend Gisèle Gagnon (Celine Lomez) gets him a new job as a nursing aide at the hospital where her father Dr. Gagnon (Yves Létourneau) works, exasperating her father because he cannot fire Conrad without damaging his relationship with his daughter, but gradually leading the two men to a position of mutual respect.

The film's supporting cast also included Denis Drouin, Suzanne Langlois, Janine Sutto, Huguette Oligny, Juliette Huot, Fernand Gignac, Michel Noël, Jacques Famery, Jean Guilda and Jean-Pierre Masson.

The film was not well-received by critics, with Robert-Claude Bérubé of the film journal Séquences writing that it had no plot progression, no intrigue and no hero. All of the journal's critics rated the film "anémix" (anemic) on the magazine's rating scale of one to four Astérix.
