= Leo Awards =

Award program of the British Columbia film and television industry

- Country: Canada
- Presented by: Motion Picture Arts and Sciences Foundation of British Columbia
- First award: 1999
- Website: http://leoawards.com

The Leo Awards are the awards program for the British Columbia film and television industry. The Leo Awards, held each May or June in Vancouver, British Columbia, Canada, were founded by the Motion Picture Arts and Sciences Foundation of British Columbia in 1999. Awards categories include but are not exclusive to live action, animated, adult dramatic, children's, documentary film, documentary television, feature films, short films.

== Event history ==
The Leos were established to provide support and recognition for the work of film and television producers, writers, directors, performers and others.

In 2005, the Leo Awards Film Festival was added to the event to showcase the best film and television productions honoured at the awards.

== Award categories ==
Awards are given to programs completed in the prior calendar year. Each year the Leo Awards honor programs and crafts in a variety of categories including motion picture, television movie, short drama, dramatic series, documentary and animation. The categories presented at the ceremony are listed below.

- Motion Picture
- Television Movie
- Best Direction
- Best Screenwriting
- Best Cinematography
- Best Picture Editing
- Best Musical Score
- Best Production Design
- Best Costume Design
- Best Make-Up
- Best Casting
- Best Supporting Performance
- Best Lead Performance
- Short Drama
- Dramatic Series
- Best Visual Effects
- Best Stunt Coordination
- Best Stunt Performance
- Best Sound in a Feature Length Drama
- Best Hairstyling in a Feature Length Drama
- Best Choreography
- Feature Length Documentary
- Short Documentary Program
- Documentary Series
- Information, Lifestyle or Reality Series
- Music, Comedy or Variety Program Series
- Animation Program
- Animation Series
- Best Art Direction
- Best Sound
- Best Voice Performance
- Youth or Children's Series
- Web Series
- Best Performance
- Music Video
- Student Production
- Youth Performance

== See also ==
- Canadian television awards
