= Artis Award =

French-Canadian television award

The Artis Award is based on popular vote and is presented for achievements in French-Canadian (Québécois) television; called in French the Prix Artis. Many notable Québécois performing artists have been honored with this award, like Rémy Girard (2006).

The Artis Award is the successor of the MetroStar Award. The sponsorship of this award and its name were changed in 2006.

From the current Artis Gala website:

". . . This gala enables the public to honor its favorite artists from Québécois television."

(". . . ce gala permet au public de rendre hommage à ses artistes favoris de la télévision québécoise.")

At the first Gala Artis, held in Montreal on Sunday, April 30, 2006, Céline Dion performed "Tout près du bonheur" (in French only) with Marc Dupré.

== See also ==
- Canadian television awards
