= Rock et Belles Oreilles =

Canadian comedy/music group

- Origin: Quebec
- Genres: Comedy
- Years active: 1981–1995
- Past members: Guy A. Lepage; Yves P. Pelletier; Bruno Landry; André Ducharme; Richard Z. Sirois; Chantal Francke

Rock et Belles Oreilles (RBO) was a Canadian radio, television, and stage comedy group popular in the primarily French-speaking province of Quebec during the 1980s and 1990s. Their name was a pun on the Hanna-Barbera blue dog character Huckleberry Hound ("Roquet Belles Oreilles" in French).

The group was formed in 1981, with the original lineup consisting of Guy A. Lepage, Yves P. Pelletier, Bruno Landry, André Ducharme, Richard Z. Sirois, and Chantal Francke. Sirois left the group in 1987 and Francke in 1992; the group separated in 1995.

== History ==
=== Radio era: 1981–1986 ===
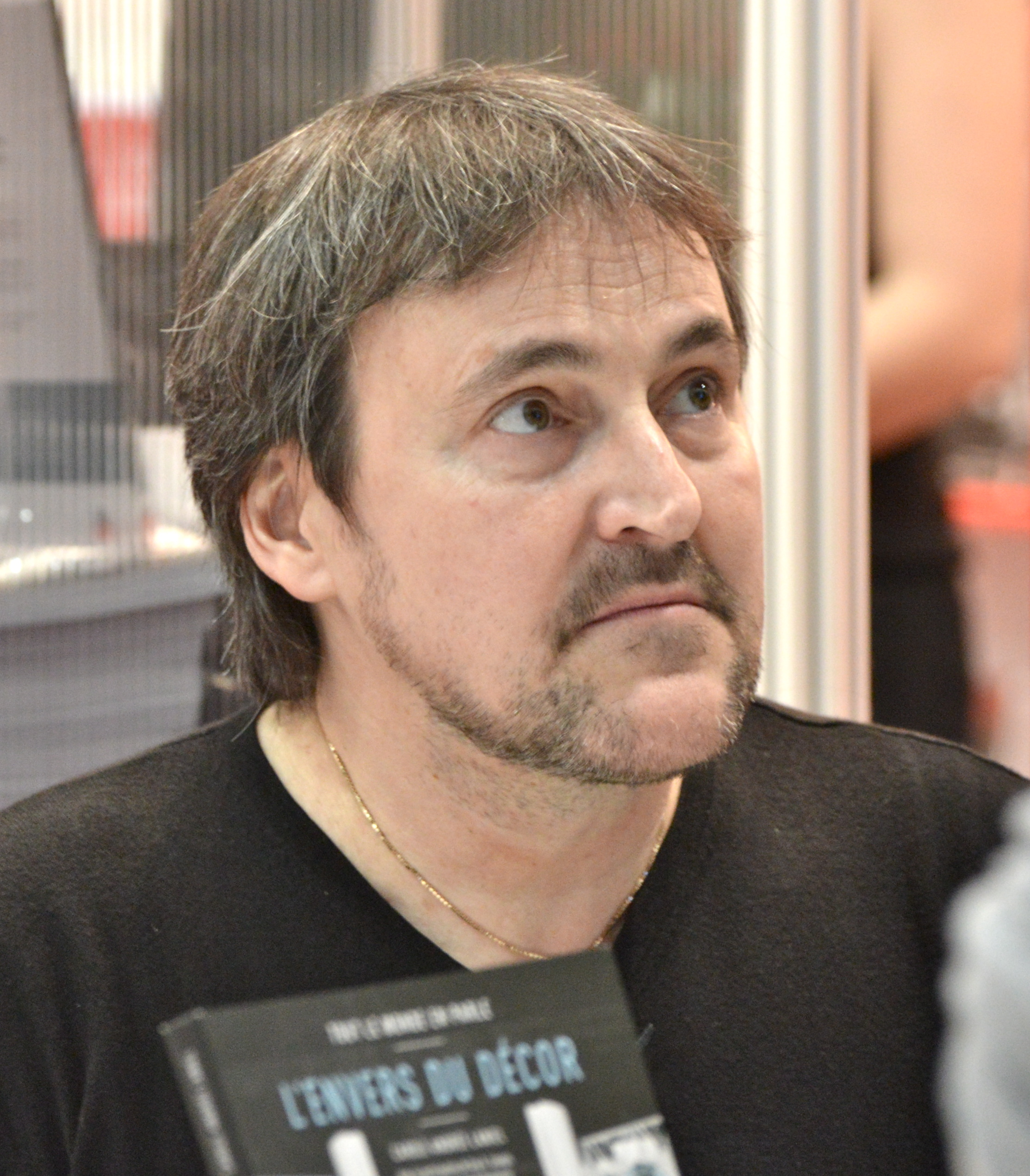
Guy A. Lepage in 2015

The show Rock et Belles Oreilles was created on 15 May 1981 by Richard Z. Sirois and Guy A. Lepage, who at the time hosted at a Montreal community radio station, and initially focused on the history of rock music. It quickly became a comedy show, however, and the duo recruited Bruno Landry, Yves P. Pelletier, and André Ducharme. Chantal Francke joined on occasion and became a permanent member of the troupe in 1987.

Rock et Belles Oreilles got their own show on CKOI-FM in 1984. Two years later, they released the album The Disque, a compilation of their most popular sketches and songs.

=== Television era: 1986–1990 ===
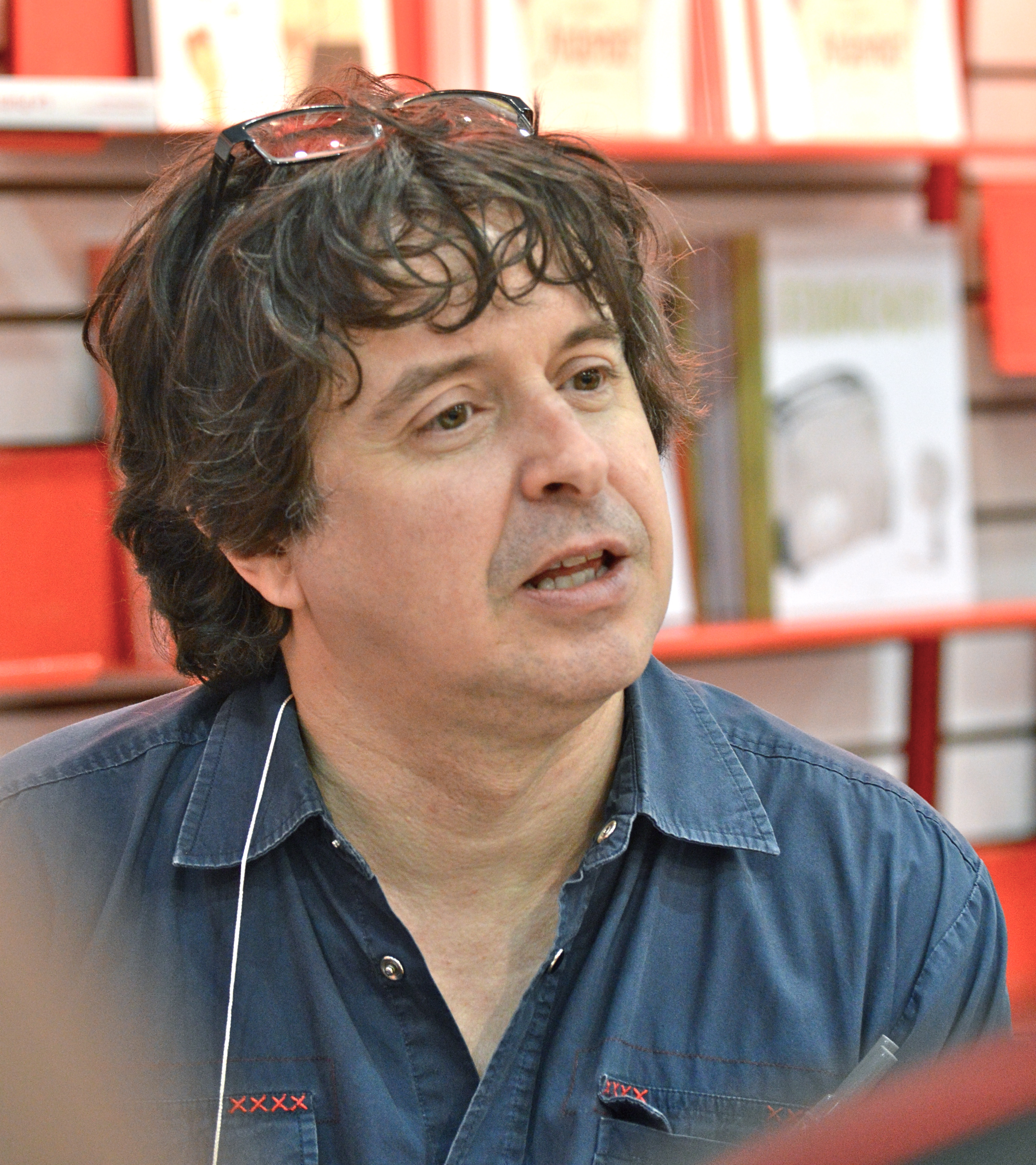
Yves Pelletier in 2015

In 1986, RBO were given a contract by Guy Fournier, director of programming at Télévision Quatre Saisons, to produce a television show, giving the group significant freedom to air their creativity. The show proved popular overall but also generated some criticism, including an article written by journalist Claude Jasmin, who criticized RBO for their crude humour.

At the start of the show's second season, in 1987, Sirois left the group and was replaced by Chantal Francke. Later the same year, RBO released the album The Spectacle. In 1989, they published the album Pourquoi chanter ?, consisting entirely of original songs. A year later, they retired their television show.

=== Further shows: 1990–1995 ===
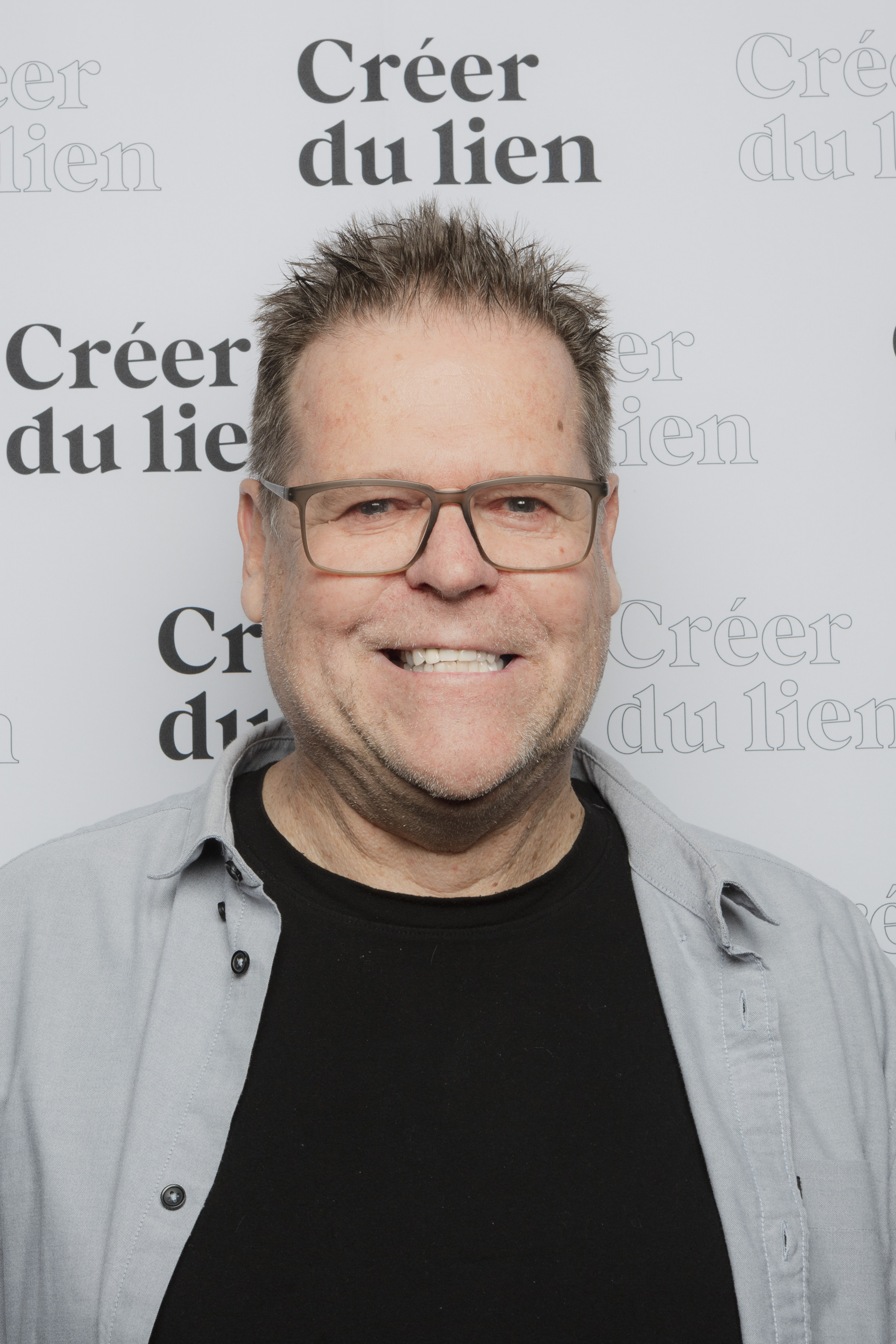
Richard Z. Sirois in 2022

Following their departure from television, RBO embarked on a two-year tour of Quebec and New Brunswick, titled Bêtes de scène. In 1991, they celebrated their tenth anniversary with the release of the compilation album Anthologie du plaisir.

After the tour, RBO returned to radio, with a daily show on the Radio-Mutuel network, and issued two more compilation albums, Le gros cru and Le gros cru 2. Chantal Francke subsequently left the group.

In 1994, the quartet moved to Ici Radio-Canada Télé, first taking part in a special titled 100% cru and later running their own show, RBO Hebdo, which would run for a year. Throughout the course of that year, the group shot three TV movies: Pas de quartier pour monsieur Caron, Vie de bureau, and Un jour mon prince viendra. A year later, on 3 May 1995, they decided to put an end to RBO, with each member intending to focus on personal projects.

=== Anniversaries: 2001–2011 ===
20th anniversary

In 2001, to celebrate the group's 20th anniversary, its former members released two compilations: The Tounes and The Sketches. They also issued a series of DVDs, included in a box set in 2004, each with a season of their former television show. The group also made several television appearances and published RBO: The Documentaire, a series of five documentaries spanning their career.

Bye Bye 2006

In 2006, to mark their 25th anniversary, RBO returned to television after being recruited by the CBC to co-produce and direct Bye Bye, a humorous end-of-year program, together with, among others, former member of the comedy troupe Les Chick'n Swell Simon-Olivier Fecteau. They returned to the show the following year.

30th anniversary

In 2011, the group received the Medal of Honor of the National Assembly of Quebec and celebrated its 30th anniversary with a radio show, a website, a mobile application, and the series RBO 3.0.

40th anniversary

On 8 December 2020, the group launched the television series RBO – The Archives on the streaming platform Crave to mark its 40th anniversary. It consists of twenty episodes that include excerpts from shows broadcast between 1986 and 1988. On 15 May 2021, Noovo presented a 60-minute special titled TOP 40 about the group, comprising an anthology of their best sketches, appearances, and interviews of the past forty years.

== Post-RBO collaborations ==
Various members of RBO have collaborated on different projects over the years, including on the following productions:

- Un gars, une fille (1997–2003)
- Tout le monde en parle (2004–present)
- Happy Camper (2004)
- Go West! A Lucky Luke Adventure (Quebec dubbed version, 2007)

== Discography ==
- La Cassette de farces (1981)
- The Disque (1986)
- The Spectacle (1987)
- Pourquoi Chanter ? (1989)
- Anthologie du Plaisir (compilation, 1991)
- Le Gros Cru (1992)
- Le Gros Cru 2 (1993)
- The Tounes (compilation, 2001)
- The Sketches (compilation, 2001)
- The Tounes + The Sketches (compilation, 2006)
