= Chez Denise =

- Created by: Denise Filiatrault
- Written by: Denise Filiatrault
- Directed by: Florent Forget; Pierre Gauvreau; Rolland Guay; Guy Hoffmann; Jean-Yves Laforce; Maude Martin; André Pagé; Gilles Perron; Hélène Roberge; Daniel Roussel
- Starring: Denise Filiatrault; Benoît Marleau; Roger Joubert; Paul Berval; Normand Brathwaite; André Montmorency
- Opening theme: "Chez Denise" by Gilles Rivard
- Country of origin: Canada
- Original language: French
- No. of seasons: 4

Production
- Running time: 25 minutes
- Production company: Société Radio-Canada

Original release
- Network: Television Radio-Canada
- Release: February 4, 1979 – May 30, 1982

Chez Denise is a Quebec comedy television series that originally ran on Television Radio-Canada from February 4, 1979 to May 30, 1982.

== Synopsis ==
Denise owns a restaurant where the employees have crazy adventures. The series was written by and starred Denise Filiatrault and the restaurant setting was one that Radio-Canada described as familiar territory for her. According to Radio-Canada, the show brought Normand Brathwaite to public attention alongside veteran performers including Benoît Marleau, Roger Joubert and André Montmorency.

== Themes ==
Chez Denise was the first television show in Quebec to have a black character, played by Normand Brathwaite. In a 2016 opinion piece for the blog section of Le Huffington Post Québec, writer Rachel Décoste criticized scenes she described as a copy of American blackface including one in which Brathwaite performs Al Jolson's "Swanee" in blackface. The series is also the first in Quebec television to have a gay character and to try and change minds on the subject of homosexuality. Christian Lalancette (played by André Montmorency), a caricatural hairdresser, has become one of the most memorable characters of the series, despite the fact that the character was only supposed to appear once. Despite fears at the time about homophobic reactions to the character, Montmorency's character was celebrated for his biting wit and his colorful presence.

== Cast ==
- Denise Filiatrault: Denise Dussault, owner of the Restaurant
- Benoît Marleau: Jean-Paul Bordeleau, bartender and server
- Roger Joubert: Firmin Lapalisse, cook
- Paul Berval: Federico Morelli, assistant cook
- Normand Brathwaite: Patrice, assistant-chef
- Louisette Dussault: Thérèse Tremblay, waitress
- Sophie Lorain: Michèle Dussault
- Jean Belzil-Gascon: Jeannot Dussault
- André Montmorency: Christian Lalancette, hairdresser
- Danielle Fichaud: Rosemonde, hairdresser
- Marco Ramirez: Arturo
- Thérèse Morange: Mme Lagacé
- Sylvie Heppel: Mme Bordeleau, mother of Jean-Paul
- Diane St-Jacques: Ginette
- Serge Dupire: Philippe Laroque, assistant cook (1981-1982)
- Juliette Pétrie: Mme Lalancette, mother of Christian
- Marc Grégoire: Guy Lalancette, brother of Christian
- Françoise Berd: Aunt Eva
- Claude Blanchard : Monseiur Tony
- Jacques Desrosiers: Roland Lagacé, Monsieur Tony's accountant
- Marcel Leboeuf: Wawa, handyman at Christian Lalancette's salon
- Marc Messier: Bernard, bartender and server
- Denys Paris: Philippe, hairdresser
- Arlette Sanders : Étiennette, spouse of Firmin Lapalisse
- Émile Genest: Monseiur Dussault, father of Denise
- Juliette Huot: Mme Dussault, mother of Denise
- Élizabeth Chouvalidzé: Dr. Mondor
- Johanne Harrelle
- André the Giant
