= Françoise Berd =

Canadian actress (1923–2001)

- Born: Françoise Bernadette Loranger; 2 March 1923; Saint-Pacôme, Quebec, Canada
- Died: August 10, 2001 (aged 78); Montreal, Quebec, Canada
- Education: École des Beaux-Arts
- Occupation: Actress

Françoise Berd (born Françoise Bernadette Loranger; March 2, 1923 – August 10, 2001) was a Canadian actress and founder of the Québécois experimental theatre company Théâtre de L'Égrégore.

== Life and career ==
Berd was born in Saint-Pacôme. However, it was not until the age of 34, upon returning from a trip to Europe, that Françoise Berd felt the call of the theatre "as a mission". Employed at the time in the operator service at Bell in Trois-Rivières, she had herself transferred to Montreal in order to study with Sita Riddez. She then produced a few plays at the School of Fine Arts (École des Beaux-Arts), notably Les Péchés dans le hall by Félix Leclerc. The piece failed, which provoked her to surround herself with professionals when founding L’Égrégore, the theatre she would run from 1959 to 1965.

How Loranger became Berd
Soon after having created L'Égrégore, Françoise Bernadette Loranger asked her namesake, the playwright Françoise Loranger, to write a love scene for the play A Gentle Creature (based on a Fyodor Dostoevsky novel). Françoise Loranger, who was already famous, sharply reproached her for having stolen her name. The director of L’Égrégore explained that they were distant cousins and, by way of conciliation, forged a new name for herself, Françoise Berd, the name she would keep from then on.

=== L'Égrégore, experimental theatre ===
To kick things off, L’Égrégore put on Une Femme douce, based on a novel by Fyodor Dostoevsky. The play earned her first prize at the Congrès du spectacle in 1960. The company adopted the formula of the pocket theatre : if a show was successful, it would run for two months, no longer, even if it continued to be popular. If a show was not successful, it would immediately be replaced by another. And if a show was not fully ready, it simply would not be put on. No entrance fee was imposed on spectators, who would give whatever they chose to give on the way out.

This formula was all the more demanding given that the company was short of money. Maurice Duplessis, the Premier of the province and Member of Parliament for Trois-Rivières, had promised her $3,000, but died before having transferred the funds.

L'Égrégore had no regular actors or directors. Director and stage director would agree on casting choices by reading the texts, without holding auditions.

The troupe would give life to only one Quebec piece: Who is Dupressin? by Gilles Derome. It also performed Samuel Beckett, August Strindberg, Alfred Jarry, Eugène Ionesco, Roland Dubillard, Roger Vitrac, Arthur Kopit, Tennessee Williams (Summer and Smoke - Été et fumée) and demanding works such as Magie rouge by Michel de Ghelderode. Along with its regular shows and a European tour, L’Égrégore had poetry and song nights.

In 1962, while producing Le Jugement de Dieu, a piece based on a poem written by Antonin Artaud, the director of L'Égrégore had a falling out with her troupe. A debate began among the directors of the company concerning the irreligion and the content of some of the texts presented. Despite the threat of being closed down, the theatre remained open, but tensions increased between the Board of Directors, who wanted a more popular repertoire, and the founder, who wanted to maintain the primary purpose of searching and experimentation.

Françoise Berd abandoned her company in 1965 and L’Égrégore ceased operations in 1966.

"L’Égrégore consistently put forward what we had rarely seen before in Quebec: visually daring theatrical worlds, in the vein of what was cutting edge in the fine arts," said Paul Lefebvre, director and drama teacher.

=== Operator once again ===
Françoise Berd then returned to Europe as a fellow of the Canadian Council for the Arts, where she developed relationships in the film industry. But she only managed to get hired through her own insistence. The producer Philippe Dussart, gave her a job as telephone operator. Then, since she knew English, she was asked to interpret contracts for Jacques Demy who directed The Young Girls of Rochefort (Les Demoiselles de Rochefort), in a coproduction with Warner Bros. For two and a half years, the productions continued: Godard, Bresson and Robert Hossein (Raspoutine).

Berd played the role of the caretaker in the film A Special Day (Una Giornata particolare) by Ettore Scola (1977), alongside Sophia Loren and Marcello Mastroianni.

=== The job of actress ===
Back in Quebec, she worked for a year as a waitress in a restaurant, then landed a job as a script girl for Gordon Sheppard on the set of Eliza’s Horoscope. She also worked in distribution, served as an intermediary between the director and Warner Bros, and became assistant-director. Francis Mankiewicz entrusted her with the distribution of the film Le Temps d’une chasse and put her to the test of playing a small acting role in the film. Claude Jutra gave her the part of the innkeeper's wife in Kamouraska. She then appeared in a dozen films, notably those of André Forcier (Bar salon, Nightcap and L'Eau chaude, l'eau frette).

She participated in La Nef des sorcières, a collective creation which premiered at the Théâtre du Nouveau Monde on March 5, 1976. She played the role of a woman "at the change of life rebelling against the social and religious prejudices against women's physicality and aging." According to the Encyclopedia of Canadian Theatre, this piece was a "masterpiece of feminist theatre, which caused a sensation at its creation, not only due to its bluntness and nudity, but also because of the beauty of its language and simplicity of presentation."

In parallel with her acting career, she directed the independent cinema grants program of the National Film Board of Canada from 1974 to 1983.

=== A passion until the end of her life ===
Françoise Berd died, aged 79, in Montreal, after a long illness. Diane Lemieux, at the time Minister of State for Communications and Culture, deplored "the loss of a pioneer of the theatre in Quebec and a woman whose work was prominent in various fields of expression, a woman of culture, of remarkable talent and scale."

== Awards in her memory ==
The Prix de l’Égrégore is awarded annually to the winner of the Intercollegial Playwrighting Contest (Concours intercollégial d’écriture dramatique) produced by the Intercollegial Network of the Sociocultural Activities of Quebec (Réseau intercollégial des activités socioculturelles du Québec – RIASQ).

The Playwrights' Centre (Centre des auteurs dramatiques - CEAD) also awards the annual Gratien-Gélinas Prize, which includes the Françoise-Berd grant of $10,000, awarded to the author of an unpublished text. It is the most important prize dedicated to emerging playwrights in Canada.

== Filmography ==
Year	Title	Role	Notes
1972	The Time of the Hunt (Le Temps d'une chasse)		
1973	Kamouraska	Innkeeper's wife	
1974	Bar Salon	Leslie	
1976	Let's Talk About Love (Parlez-nous d'amour)	Great admirer of Jeannot	
1976	A Pacemaker and a Sidecar (L'Eau chaud, l'eau frette)	Françoise	
1977	Bernie and the Gang (Ti-Mine, Bernie pis la gang...)		
1977	J.A. Martin Photographer (J.A. Martin photographe)	An old servant	
1977	A Special Day (Una Giornata particolare)	The caretaker	
1979	Quintet	Charity House woman	
1979	La Belle Apparence	Cécile Gauthier	
1979-1980	Chez Denise	Aunt Eva	12 episodes
1980	Cordélia	Mrs. Parslow	
1980	The Lucky Star	The cashier	
1980	The Dame in Colour (La Dame en couleurs)		
1982	Killing 'em Softly (La mort en douce)		
1983	Au pays de Zom	Mrs. Zom	
1983	The Tin Flute (Bonheur d'occasion)	Maman Philibert	
1983	Contrecoeur		
1984	Amuse-gueule		Short
1985	Agnes of God	Sister Thérèse	
1991	Lance et compte : Tous pour un		TV movie
1992	The Clean Machine (Tirelire Combines & Cie)	Mrs. Turcotte	
1994	The Wind from Wyoming (Le Vent du Wyoming)	Sister Amanda	(final film role)

== Productions ==
Year	Title
1977	J.A. Martin Photographer
1978	Yèlèma donna kow la nankòròla
1981	On est rendu devant le monde!
1981	Fond Memories
