= Gaétan Huot =

Canadian film editor

- Occupation: Film editor
- Awards: Genie Award for Best Editing

Gaétan Huot is a Canadian film editor from Quebec.

For director François Girard, Huot edited the 1993 film Thirty Two Short Films About Glenn Gould, for which he won the Genie Award for Best Editing. By 1994, he had a shop in Montreal, where he mentored novice editor Yvann Thibodeau. In 1997, Huot was nominated for a Genie Award again for editing Karmina.

Huot was among the Thirty Two Short Films About Glenn Gould crew who reunited with Girard for the 1998 film The Red Violin. For The Red Violin, he won for Best Editing at the 1st Jutra Awards in 1999, and was nominated at the 4th Jutra Awards in 2002 for Karmina 2.
