= List of Canadian television awards =

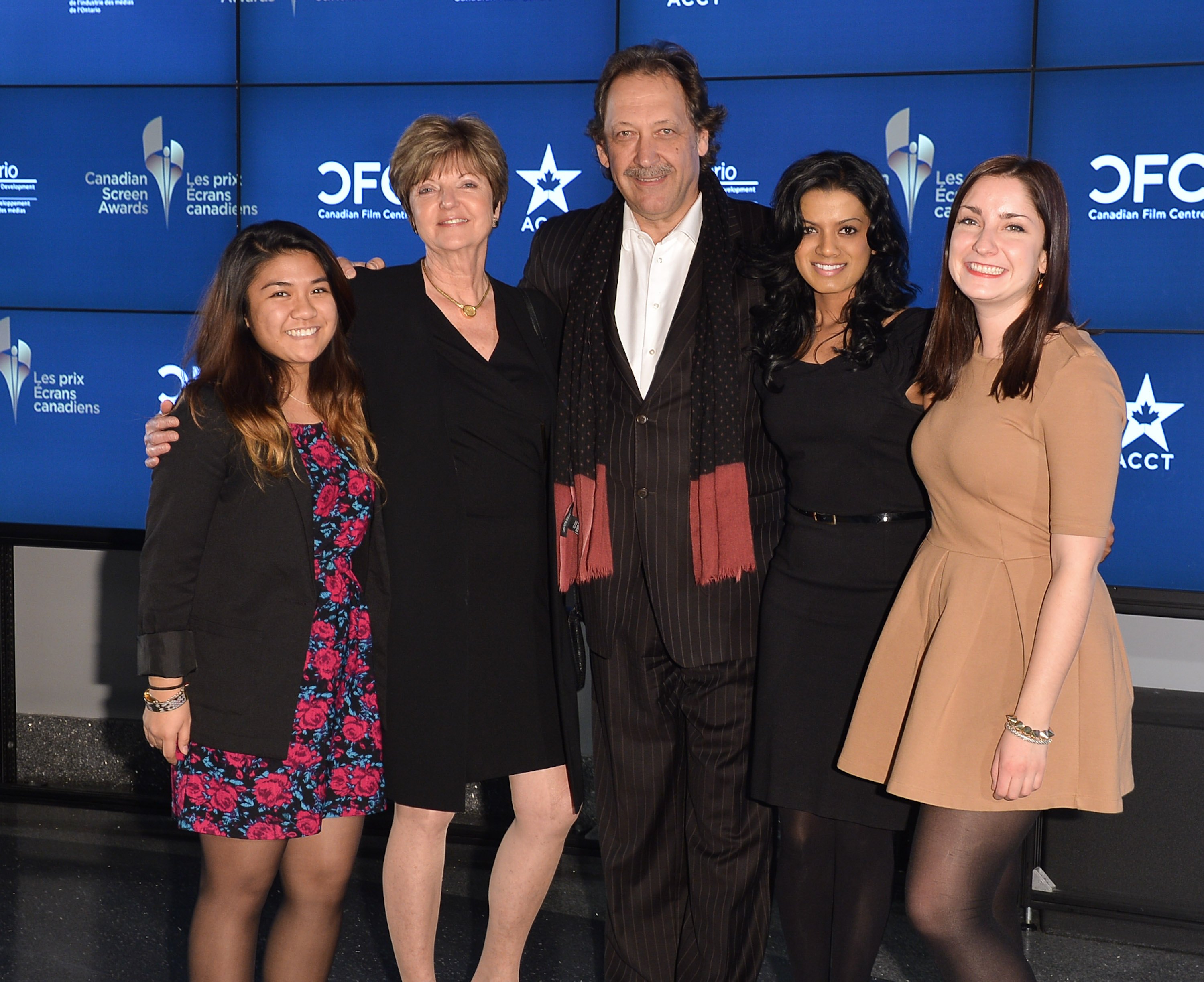
2013 Canadian Screen Awards nominee reception

Canadian Television Awards are given by several organizations for contributions in various fields of television in Canada. They include national and regional award shows.

== General ==
Award	Sponsor	Notes
ACTRA Award	ACTRA :Alliance of Canadian Cinema, Television and Radio Artists	Main national television award from 1972 to 1986, when they were taken over by the Academy of Canadian Cinema and Television to create the Gemini Awards; now presented as a regional film and television award to honour local production, by each of ACTRA's individual regional chapters.
Artis Award	Groupe TVA	Successor in 2006 of the MetroStar Award for achievements in French-Canadian television.
Canadian Screen Awards	Academy of Canadian Cinema & Television	The first Canadian Screen Awards were held on 4 March 2013, replacing the Gemini Awards (television) and Genie Awards (film)
CAFTCAD Awards	CAFTCAD	For achievements in Costume design in Television and Motion pictures
Constellation Awards	TCON Promotional Society	Best science fiction or fantasy works. Founded in 2007, and ran through 2014
Directors Guild of Canada Award for Best Direction - Family	Directors Guild of Canada	Programs for children and family produced in Canada. Created in 2002
Golden Maple Awards	Academy of Canadians in Sports and Entertainment	Canadian actors performing in television shows broadcast in the United States
Leo Awards	Motion Picture Arts and Sciences Foundation of British Columbia	Film and television productions in British Columbia
MetroStar Award	Metro Inc.	Achievements in French-Canadian television, Replaced by Artis Award in 2006
Prix Gémeaux	Academy of Canadian Cinema & Television	French Canadian achievements in Canadian television. Since 1985.
Rosie Awards	Alberta Media Production Industries Association	Province of Alberta film and television awards AMPIA is non-profit professional association that supports its members by encouraging the development of the film industry in the province of Alberta.
Spacey Awards	CTV Sci-Fi Channel	Annual award presented by the Canadian cable network Space from 2003–2007
TCA Awards	Television Critics Association	Outstanding achievements in television
WGC Screenwriting Awards	Writers Guild of Canada	Best script for a feature film, television or radio project

== Gemini Awards ==
The Gemini Awards were awards given by the Academy of Canadian Cinema & Television to recognize the achievements of Canada's television industry. First held in 1986 to replace the ACTRA Award, in April 2012, the Academy of Canadian Cinema & Television announced that the Gemini Awards and the Genie Awards would be discontinued and replaced by a new award ceremony dedicated to all forms of Canadian media, including television, film, and digital media.

== See also ==
- List of television awards
