= Saint-Octave-de-Métis =

- Parish municipality
- Church in Saint-Octave-de-Métis

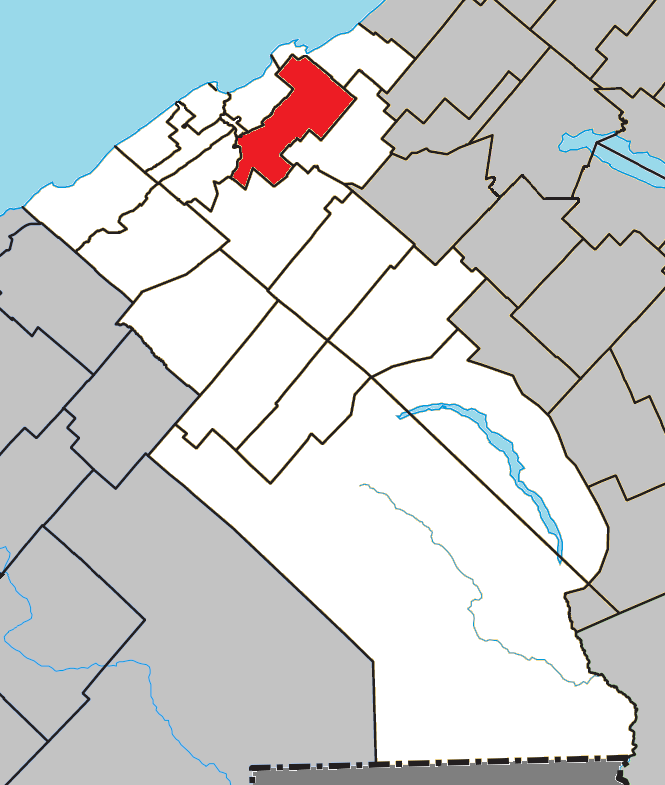
- Location within La Mitis RCM

- Location in eastern Quebec
- Coordinates: 48.6009025°N 68.0808572°W
- Country: Canada
- Province: Quebec
- Region: Bas-Saint-Laurent
- RCM: La Mitis
- Constituted: April 25, 1908

Government
  - Mayor: Maxime Richard-Dubé
  - Federal riding: Rimouski-Neigette—Mitis—Matapédia—Les Basques
  - Prov. riding: Matane-Matapédia-Mitis

Area
  - Total: 75.20 km^{2} (29.03 sq mi)
  - Land: 75.16 km^{2} (29.02 sq mi)

Population (2021)
  - Total: 493
  - Density: 6.6/km^{2} (17/sq mi)
  - Pop 2016-2021: ▼3.5%
  - Dwellings: 221
- Time zone: UTC−5 (EST)
  - Summer (DST): UTC−4 (EDT)
- Postal code(s): G0J 3B0
- Area codes: 418 and 581
- Highways: R-234
- Website: municipalites-du-quebec.ca/st-octave-de-metis/

Saint-Octave-de-Métis is a parish municipality in Quebec, Canada.

== History ==
The first settlers began arriving in this area, called "Métis" around 1840. In 1855, the municipality of Métis was officially founded. In 1859, a sector of Métis split and became the new municipality of Mac Nider. One year later, in 1860, Métis changed its name to Saint-Octave-de-Métis. The municipality lost significative portions of its territory twice before the end of the 19th century. First in 1878 for the creation of Saint-Moïse and again in 1897 for the creation of Petit-Métis. Finally in 1908, Saint-Octave-de-Métis was divided in two distinct municipalities: Saint-Octave-de-Métis and Saint-Octave-de-Métis-Sud.

This municipality was therefore officially created in 1908 under the name Saint-Octave-de-Métis-Sud, and was created by the division of Saint-Octave-de-Métis. In 1931, the original municipality of Saint-Octave-de-Métis changed its name to Grand-Métis, therefore, Saint-Octave-de-Métis-Sud took the current name of Saint-Octave-de-Métis. In 1952, Saint-Octave-de-Métis lost an important portion of its territory for the creation of Les Boules, which has since been merged with Métis-sur-Mer.

== Demographics ==
In the 2021 Census of Population conducted by Statistics Canada, Saint-Octave-de-Métis had a population of 493 living in 207 of its 221 total private dwellings, a change of −3.5% from its 2016 population of 511. With a land area of 75.16 km^{2} (29.02 sq mi), it had a population density of 6.6/km^{2} (17.0/sq mi) in 2021.

== Notable people ==
- Jules-André Brillant, born 1888, baptized and educated in Saint-Octave-de-Métis, French Canadian entrepreneur
- Hormisdas Langlais, born in 1890, was a Canadian politician and a seven-term Member of the Legislative Assembly of Quebec
- Marguerite Ruest-Pitre, born 1908, Canadian murderer also known as "Madame le Corbeau", the last woman criminal executed in Canada (1953)
- Marie-Thérèse Fortin, born 1959, Canadian actress
- Anaïs Favron, born in 1977, is a radio and TV host, actress, and improviser

== See also ==
- List of parish municipalities in Quebec
