= Karmina 2 =

- French: Karmina 2, L'Enfer de Chabot
- Directed by: Gabriel Pelletier
- Written by: Yves Pelletier; Gabriel Pelletier
- Produced by: Nicole Robert
- Starring: Gildor Roy; Yves Pelletier; Isabelle Cyr; Robert Brouillette
- Cinematography: Daniel Villeneuve
- Edited by: Gaétan Huot
- Music by: Gaétan Essiambre
- Production company: Go Films
- Distributed by: Alliance Vivafilm
- Release date: July 13, 2001
- Running time: 97 minutes
- Country: Canada
- Language: French

Karmina 2 (French: Karmina 2, L'Enfer de Chabot) is a Canadian comedy horror film from Quebec, directed by Gabriel Pelletier and released in 2001.

A sequel to the 1996 film Karmina, the film centres on Ghislain Chabot (Gildor Roy), the potion-maker who had a smaller supporting role in the first film. When his wife Linda (Diane Lavallée) throws him out of the house after a fight, blocking his access to the potion that he sells to vampires to allow them to take human form, he is forced to figure out how to get back into the house to reclaim his supplies. Meanwhile, Karmina (Isabelle Cyr) and Philippe (Robert Brouillette) return to Montreal.

The cast also includes Yves Pelletier, Sylvie Léonard, Julien Poulin, Michel Courtemanche, France Castel, Sylvie Potvin, Pierre Collin, Macha Limonchik, Annie Dufresne, Michel Laperrière, Louis Champagne, Richard Thériault, Gary Boudreault and Marie-Chantal Perron.

== Awards ==
The film received two Genie Award nominations at the 22nd Genie Awards in 2002, for Best Overall Sound (Luc Boudrias, Yvon Benoît, Jo Caron, Benoit Leduc) and Best Sound Editing (Marcel Pothier, Mathieu Beaudin, Jérôme Décarie, Jacques Plante, Claire Pochon).

Gaétan Huot was a Jutra Award nominee for Best Editing at the 4th Jutra Awards.
