= Karmina (film) =

- Directed by: Gabriel Pelletier
- Written by: Ann Burke; Yves Pelletier; Andrée Pelletier; Gabriel Pelletier
- Produced by: Nicole Robert; Luc Vandal
- Starring: Isabelle Cyr; Robert Brouillette; Yves Pelletier; France Castel; Gildor Roy
- Cinematography: Éric Cayla
- Edited by: Gaétan Huot
- Music by: Patrick Bourgeois
- Production company: Lux Films
- Distributed by: Ciné 360
- Release date: November 1, 1996
- Running time: 110 min.
- Country: Canada
- Language: French

Karmina is a Canadian comedy horror film from Quebec, released in 1996.

== Plot ==
The film stars Isabelle Cyr as Karmina, a vampire from Transylvania who runs away to live with her aunt Esméralda (France Castel) in Quebec to escape an arranged marriage to Vlad (Yves Pelletier). Vampires living in North America have access to a magic potion which enables them to keep their vampire natures in check so that they can live in harmony with humans, and Karmina begins a relationship with Philippe (Robert Brouillette), a church organist. However, Vlad and Karmina's parents (Raymond Cloutier and Sylvie Potvin) soon show up to retrieve her.

== Sequel ==
A sequel film, Karmina 2 (Karmina 2: L'Enfer de Chabot), was released in 2001.

== Awards ==
The film won two Genie Awards at the 18th Genie Awards, for Best Art Direction/Production Design (Normand Sarazin) and Best Costume Design (Denis Sperdouklis), as well as a special award for Best Makeup (Pierre Saindon). It was also nominated, but did not win, in the categories of Best Picture, Best Actress (Isabelle Cyr), Best Supporting Actress (France Castel), Best Director (Gabriel Pelletier), Best Screenplay (Gabriel Pelletier, Yves Pelletier, Andrée Pelletier and Ann Burke), Best Cinematography (Éric Cayla), Best Editing (Gaétan Huot), Best Overall Sound (Jo Caron, Luc Boudrias, Don Cohen, Bruno Ruffolo) and Best Sound Editing (Louis Dupire, Diane Boucher, Martin Pinsonnault, Monique Vézina and Alice Wright).
