= Gilles Latulippe =

Canadian actor, comedian, theatre director

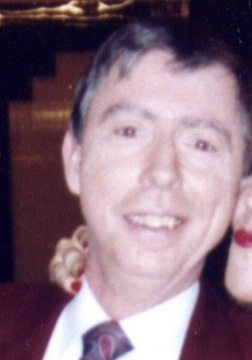
- Gilles Latulippe in Quebec City in 1994.
- Born: 31 August 1937; Montreal, Quebec, Canada
- Died: 23 September 2014 (aged 77); Montreal, Quebec, Canada
- Occupations: Actor, comedian and theater director and manager
- Years active: 1959–2014
- Awards: Prix Gémeaux, MetroStar Awards, Order of Canada, National Order of Quebec, Order of La Pléiade

Gilles Latulippe CM CQ (31 August 1937 – 23 September 2014) was a Québécois actor, comedian and theatre director and manager. Latulippe was a central figure in the history of comic theatre in Quebec. In 1998, he was named Quebec's favourite actor by the daily tabloid Le Journal de Montréal.

== Career ==
He was born in Montreal in 1937. Latulippe joined Yvon Deschamps and studied theatre under François Rozet. He met Paul Buissonneau who offered him his first roles. He was noticed by Gratien Gélinas who gave him a part in Bousille et les justes in 1959. During the 1960s, Latulippe became a star of the cabaret and comic theatre scene in Montreal while beginning a successful television career. In 1967, he founded the Théâtre des Variétés of Montreal, which was filled by happy spectators for 7000 performances. The Variétés was run without any government subsidy for 33 years and closed in 2000. Latulippe remained very active in his last years.

His film credits included Oh, If Only My Monk Would Want (Ah! Si mon moine voulait...), The Merry World of Leopold Z (La vie heureuse de Léopold Z), Two Women in Gold (Deux femmes en or), Hold on to Daddy's Ears (Tiens-toi bien après les oreilles à papa), Kamouraska, Don't Push It (Pousse mais pousse égal) and Hot Dogs (Les Chiens chauds).

Latulippe was the recipient of many honours over his career. He won a number of Prix Gémeaux and MetroStar Awards for his work in television, including a lifetime achievement award at the 2007 Prix Gémeaux. He was also a member of the Order of Canada (2003), a knight of the National Order of Quebec (2009) and a knight of the Order of La Pléiade (2000). He died of lung cancer in 2014. Montreal Mayor Denis Coderre stated that flags at city hall would be flown at half mast, and that Latulippe will lie in state there.
