= Robert Brouillette =

Canadian actor

Robert Brouillette (born April 15, 1965) is a Canadian actor from Quebec. He is most noted for his performance in the film Eldorado, for which he was a Genie Award nominee for Best Supporting Actor at the 16th Genie Awards in 1996.

His other roles have included the television series Watatatow, Blanche, km/h and 4 et demi, the films Karmina, Karmina 2, Séraphin: Heart of Stone (Séraphin: un homme et son péché), The Rocket (Maurice Richard) and Ravenous (Les Affamés), and roles on stage.
