= Richard Z. Sirois =

Canadian radio host and comedian (born 1956)

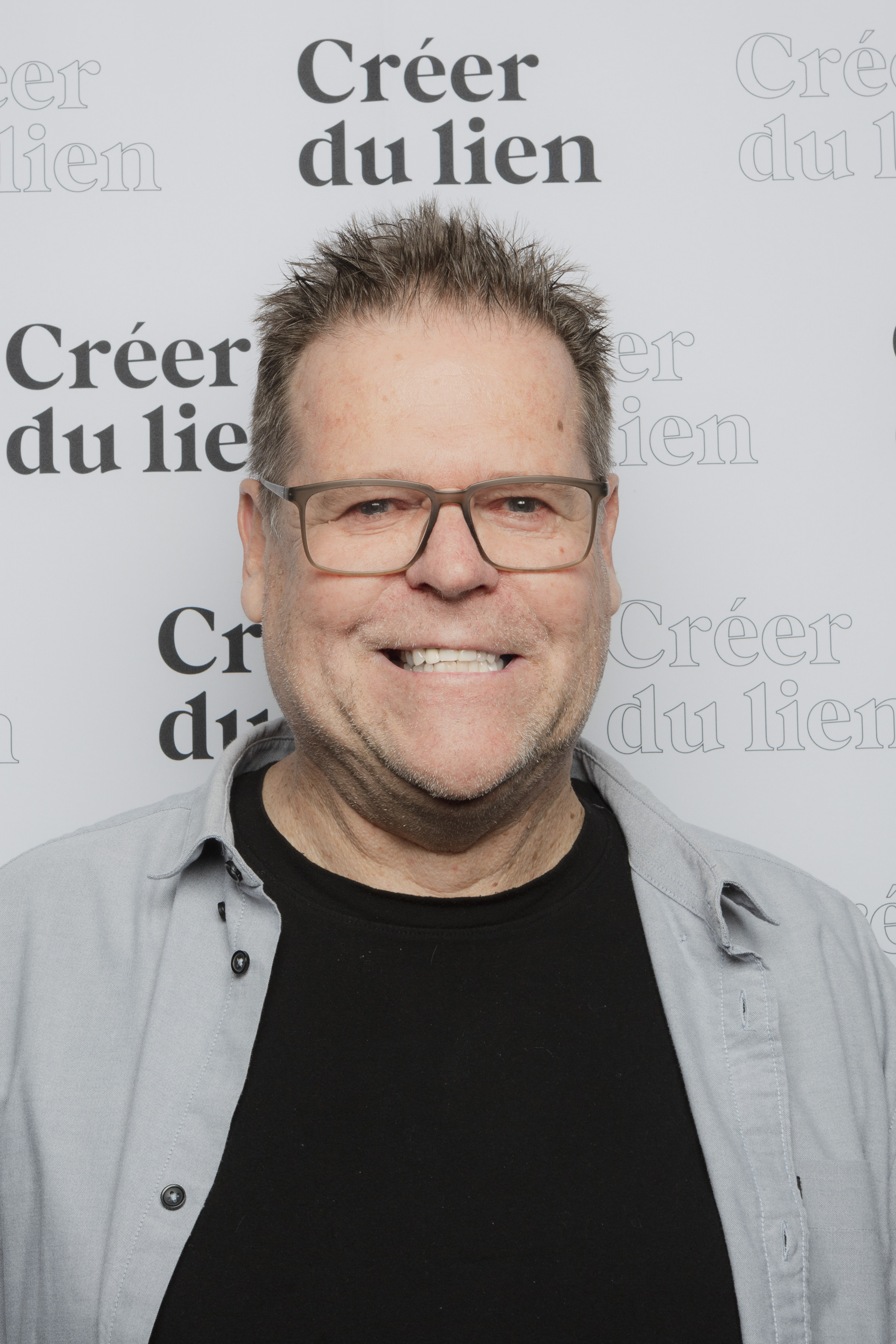
Richard Z. Sirois in 2022

Richard Z. Sirois (born 19 July 1956) is a French-speaking Canadian radio and television comedian. He was born in Matane, Quebec. His family moved to Montreal when he was six years old.

== Comedy ==
Sirois was included in the lineups of Les Bleu Poudre and (until 1987) Rock et Belles Oreilles. Rock et Belles Oreilles started in 1981 as a radio show on Montreal-based French-speaking community radio station CIBL-FM 101.5 and evolved into a group of comedians who produced sketches for television and stage performances. Les Bleu Poudre hosted a TV show called 100 Limite on Télévision Quatre-Saisons from 1988 to 1992. Sirois cohosted a number of radio shows on CKOI-FM 96.9 in Montreal, including Les Midis Fous in the early 1990s with Mike Bossy, Anthony Kavanagh, François Massicotte, Pierre Verville and André Robitaille, and Les Cerveaux de l'info with the comedy duo Masked Avengers. He also hosted a syndicated radio program, Electric Avenue, which is produced by Kréaction Media and airs on francophone radio stations in Quebec and Ontario.

== Music commentary ==
In the wake of the 2020 COVID-19 pandemic lockdown, he left Villeray, Montreal and moved back to his hometown of Matane. Since then he has published daily commentaries about music records on the social media. From October 2021 to July 2022, he hosted a radio show called Les Vinyles de A à Z on Arsenal Media. In March 2022, he authored a book called Le vinyle de l'insomniaque.

== Politics ==
Sirois ran as the Rhinoceros Party candidate for Hochelaga—Maisonneuve in the 1984 Canadian federal election. He finished fourth with 1,847 votes (5.7%).

As of 2021, he is active with the Parti Québécois committee of Matane-Matapédia.

His father Yvon Sirois (1930-2018) was assistant general manager of the Quebec Chamber of Commerce in the 1960s, ran as the Progressive Conservative candidate for Matane in the 1972 Canadian federal election and served as the party's general manager in Quebec.

== Personal life ==
Sirois has three children.

From 1931 until 1995, his paternal grandfather Victor Sirois (1901-1977) and then his aunt Yvonne Sirois (1930-2018) ran a professional photo studio in Matane.
