= Tout le monde en parle (Canadian talk show) =

Quebec talk show

- Original logo used from 2004 to 2012.
- Genre: Talk show
- Created by: Guy A. Lepage; Québec adaptation; Thierry Ardisson; Original concept
- Directed by: Manon Brisebois
- Presented by: Guy A. Lepage
- Country of origin: Canada
- Original language: French
- No. of seasons: 18

Production
- Producer: Guy A. Lepage
- Production locations: Maison Radio-Canada; Montreal, Quebec
- Editor: Guy A. Lepage
- Running time: 140 minutes
- Production companies: Avanti Ciné Vidéo; Le gars de la TV; Les productions Jacques K Primeau; Radio-Canada

Original release
- Network: Ici Radio-Canada Télé
- Release: 12 September 2004 – present

Tout le monde en parle (French pronunciation: [tu l(ə) mɔ̃d ɑ̃ paʁl]; "Everyone's Talking About It") is a Quebec talk show hosted and co-produced by Guy A. Lepage, broadcast on Télévision de Radio-Canada / Ici Radio-Canada Télé since 2004, and simulcast on the radio on Ici Radio-Canada Première. It is adapted from the former French talk show of the same name, created and hosted by Thierry Ardisson.

== Concept ==
Every week, the show welcomes various personalities from different spheres: politics, sport, show, literature, journalism, religion, etc. They usually have taken part in current events, and although they are mostly Quebecers, they are sometimes international guests. They are invited to discuss, freely express themselves, and share their opinions on hot topics or topics directly related to them.

The show often consists of interviews or games, but sometimes only discussion. The host leads debates and conversations. A co-host, known as Le fou du roi (English: the jester), reacts promptly and spontaneously in a humorous way to the debate.

== Political impact ==
TLMEP has had a notable effect upon Canada's national politics, as political leaders from outside of Quebec often use the show as a platform for introducing themselves to Quebec voters. Several commentators have suggested that Jack Layton's appearances on TLMEP were critical in fostering his party's Quebec breakthrough in the 2011 Canadian federal election. Layton's success created an expectation that other leaders would follow in his footsteps: since 2011, every federal party leader except Stephen Harper has made an appearance.

== Host and co-host ==
Since the debut of the show, the host has been Guy A. Lepage, a former member of the sketch comedy group Rock et Belles Oreilles (RBO) and "the guy" in the sitcom Un gars, une fille (English: A Guy & a Girl). A guest host is brought in when Lepage is away, although this happens extremely rarely. For example, in the 3 December 2006 edition, Lepage was replaced by Véronique Cloutier so Lepage could participate in an interview with RBO about taking the reins of the end-of-year special Bye Bye.

The co-host was Dany Turcotte, a former member of the sketch comedy group Groupe sanguin, until 14 February 2021.

After March 2021, the role of co-host has been filled by Anaïs Favron, Alexandre Barrette, Virginie Fortin, Pierre-Yves Roy-Desmarais, MC Gilles, and the occasional return of Dany Turcotte.

== See also ==
- List of Quebec television series imports and exports
- List of Quebec television series
- Television of Quebec
