= Kino (movement) =

Film-making organization

Kino is a film-making movement that advocates the production of short-films on little to no budget, using small crews, and non-competitive collaboration. There are Kino Groups around the world. Kino is divided into individual cells, or chapters, most of which have a monthly screening where member directors and guests can screen their films. Cells may also feature "Kino Kabarets", where members of the public are invited to collaborate and create films.

== History ==
The Kino movement was founded in 1999 in Montreal, Quebec, Canada by Christian Laurence and friends. It has since spread worldwide (mostly in French-speaking countries and central Europe), and is now composed of over 70 physical cells, as well as many Facebook groups.
