= Content & Company =

American media studio

Content & Co
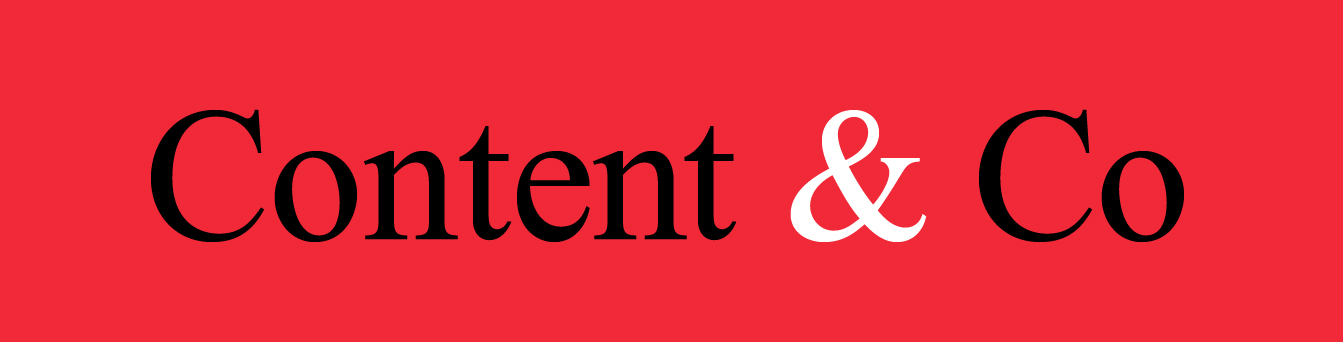
- Type: Privately held company
- Industry: Entertainment
- Founded: 2008
- Founder: Stuart McLean
- Defunct: September 12, 2018
- Fate: Acquired
- Successor: Psyop (company)
- Headquarters: Los Angeles, California, United States
- Products: Branded short movies
- Owner: Psyop (company)
- Website: contentandcompany.com

Content & Company, or Content & Co, was an American media studio that created branded short films and media content that was based in Los Angeles. The company was acquired by Psyop media company in 2018, expanding the company's suite of services and creator network.

The company was originally founded by Stuart McLean in 2008. The company created and distributes diverse branded content, including webisodes, micro series, short and long format series, scripted and reality formats, such as its 2012 production with Subway for a show called "4 to 9ers," a series of six 10-minute long episodes featured on Hulu, YouTube and several other websites.

Content & Co also produced the documentary series "Stand United," in partnership with acclaimed filmmaker Robert Rodriguez and RAM Truck Brand.

== History ==
Content & Company (Content & Co) was founded in 2008 by Stuart McLean. Previously, McLean co-founded Bedell McLean Branded Entertainment, and later was co-president of JWTwo Entertainment. McLean was the chief executive officer of Content & Co.

In 2010, Content & Co launched the action sports series "Clean Break" for Schick Hydro on Crackle in June, and produced "Golf Therapy: Life Lessons and the Pursuit of Par" with Subway and actor/producer Brian Baumgartner in July 2010. Content & Co launched the Subway Fresh Artists campaign in September 2010.

In 2012, Content & Co launched "The 4 to 9ers," a scripted comedy for Subway that was distributed on Hulu, YouTube and other websites. In 2014, Content & Co partnered with Subway and AwesomenessTV to launch a series called "Summer with Cimorelli."

Content & Co launched the documentary series "Stand United" in 2018, in partnership with acclaimed filmmaker Robert Rodriguez and RAM Truck Brand. The series ran on Rodriguez's El Rey Network.

Content & Co was acquired by Psyop in 2018, expanding the company's suite of services and creator network.

== Projects ==
=== Clean Break ===
Content & Co. teamed up with Schick Hydro to create a branded entertainment web production called "Clean Break." The action-sports web series, which was initially distributed by Sony Pictures Television's Crackle.com, now airs on Fuel TV and Yahoo!. The series features two young male athletes who lead viewers through a series of destinations for sports along the Pacific Coast, including kite-boarding, surfing and skateboarding. Schick was not directly integrated into the series, however the brand did receive exclusive pre-roll and display inventory surrounding the "Clean Break" webisodes. The series started in 2010 and has run for three seasons.

=== Golf Therapy ===
In July 2010, Content & Co partnered with Subway, NBC and Emmy Award-winning actor Brian Baumgartner of The Office to produce the branded entertainment project "Golf Therapy: Life, Lessons and the Pursuit of Par." The one-hour comedy/sports special aired on NBC August 1, 2010. The special featured Baumgartner trying to overcome his nightmares of his annual appearance in the Lake Tahoe celebrity golf tournament by getting tips from various professional athletes. Guests included Los Angeles Lakers' Pau Gasol; New York Yankees' pitcher CC Sabathia; current and former New York Giants defensive linemen Justin Tuck and Michael Strahan; U.S. Olympic gymnast Nastia Liukin; Muhammad Ali's daughter Laila Ali, a former pro boxer; and Green Bay Packers' quarterback Aaron Rodgers. Subway backed the project as a way to promote its "Famous Fans" program, which is made up of athletes who promote the brand, and aired the special on screens in its 23,000 stores across the country. The series began in 2010 and has run for three seasons.

=== The 4 to 9ers ===
"The 4 to 9ers" is a scripted comedy for Subway that launched in 2012. It follows the lives of high school students as they begin part-time jobs. Season two evolved to focus on recent college graduates working part-time jobs in order to move out of their parents' house. The series is written, directed and produced by Two and a Half Men director Jamie Widdoes, writing veteran Tim O'Donnell (Growing Pains, Dave's World) and Content & Co Executive Producer Peter Isacksen. Actors including Doris Roberts, Amy Yasbeck and Ted McGinley have all starred in the show. The program runs on Hulu, with additional content on YouTube, Instagram, Facebook and Twitter. Season one became a top short-form comedy on Hulu and the series is now going into its third season.

"The 4 to 9ers" series has won awards including Advertising Age's 2014 Small Agency Awards (silver in the Integrated Campaign of the Year category), 2014 thinkLA Interactive Idea Award (Best Video Campaign), and MediaCom's 2014 Festival of Media Awards (Best Digitally Integrated Campaign and bronze in Best Use of Content). It also won a Creative Media Award in 2014.

=== Summer with Cimorelli ===
Content & Co worked with Subway and AwesomenessTV to launch a new scripted comedy called "Summer with Cimorelli" in 2014. The series stars Cimorelli, a six-sister a cappella group, made popular on YouTube. It is cross-promoted by Subway, AwesomenessTV, YouTube and Cimorelli.

Filmed on location throughout the Los Angeles area, "Summer with Cimorelli" is a five-episode comedy about how the Cimorelli sisters survive the summer with no parents and no money. The series is written by Douglas Lieblein, co-executive producer of Hannah Montana, directed by Melanie Mayron, director of ABC Family's Pretty Little Liars and executive produced by Peter Isacksen of Content & Co.

=== Subway Fresh Artists Filmmakers ===
Content & Co works with Subway, the USC School of Cinematic Arts and the New York University Tisch School of the Arts on an original web-series competition called the "Subway Fresh Artists Filmmakers" program. The winner receives Subway-funded online distribution, potential film festival screenings and in-store promotion. The webseries made in the competition were distributed by My Damn Channel and IFC, and Content & Co. partnered with the Academy of Television for the Subway Fresh Artist awards. The Subway Fresh Artists campaign launched in September 2010 and has been running for five years. More than 1,200 bands entered the competition and over one million consumers listened and voted through OurStage and Clear Channel Radio, now known as iHeartMedia stations. The winning band, Stars Go Dim, had the opportunity to open for a Goo Goo Dolls concert.

=== Stand United ===
"Stand United" is an original documentary series produced by Content & Co in partnership with RAM Truck Brand. The series first aired on Rodriguez's El Rey Network on April 29, 2018.

== Recognition ==
During its operation, the company won various Cynopsis Digital Model D awards, as well as Advertising Age's Small Agency Integrated Campaign of the Year in 2014. Content & Company has also received several Effie awards for shows such as "4 to 9ers" and Schick Hydro's "Clean Break."
