= Les Zapartistes =

Comedian group of Quebec province, Canada

Les Zapartistes are a group of Quebecois comedians, founded in Montreal in 2001, and specialising in political humour. The group performs live and for television, generally in the context of special events such as the annual Fête nationale du Québec as well as in various comedy programmes.

The group's first performance was the improv show Improvisons des élections (Let's Improvise the Elections) in Montreal on the evening of the 2000 Canadian federal election. They never signed with a major production company and organized their own tours. They performed in support of the Occupy Montreal movement.

It won a Prix Gémeaux in 2004 (the francophone equivalent of Canada's Gemini awards) for best comedy, variety or talk-show performance.

The group's name comes from the Zapatista Army of National Liberation, a Mexican political movement that defends the Chiapas Indians, and from l'Aparté, a small café across the street from the National Theatre School of Canada where the group was founded. Despite a generally careful use of language, the group's slogan is "against corruption, cultural uniformity, soundbites and sloganeering, the privatisation of our natural resources, military incompetence and loads of other stuff." («[...] s'opposer à la corruption, à la culture du consensus, à la langue de bois, à la privatisation de nos ressources, à la débilité militaire pis à ben d’autres affaires») This slogan is in their manifesto, whose style harkens back to the roots of Quebec's Quiet Revolution.

The humour of Les Zapartistes targets what they take to be immorality and illegality in Canadian politics. The group advertises itself as supportive of Quebec independence with respect to the Canadian federal government, which has been undermined by the recent Sponsorship scandal, but does not necessarily promote Quebec sovereignty.

The group often performs parodies of popular music to make its point. For example, its song "Les Fonds publics" (Public finance) is a parody of "Les Amoureux des bancs publics" by Georges Brassens, through which it attacks financial abuses in the production of television programmes.

The members of Les Zapartistes are:

- Christian Vanasse
- Vincent Bolduc
- Jean-François Nadeau
- Brigitte Poupart

All members participate in writing and development, but Vincent does not perform. Denis Trudel, Geneviève Rochette, Frédéric Savard, François Parenteau, François Patenaude, Nadine Vincent (the group's editing specialist), and Gaétan Troutet (the group's music specialist) are past members of the group.

At the end of 2019, the group announced that they would disband after performing a last show in May 2020. Members reformed for another final show 28–29 May 2022.
