= Michel Noël =

Quebecois actor (1922–1993)

Michel Noël, born Jean-Noel Croteau (June 27, 1922 – June 22, 1993) was a Quebecois actor most famous for his character of Capitaine Bonhomme. This literary character was adapted into a children's TV show, Le Cirque du Capitaine (1970-1973), which was also adapted into a comic strip by Gui Laflamme.

He appeared in many TV series, and also recorded and sold records.

== Filmography ==
- 1954–1957: L'Île aux trésors (TV series): Capitaine Hublot
- 1957: Elise Velder (TV series)
- 1957–1961: La Pension Velder (TV series): Philidor Papineau
- 1959: L'Héritage
- 1963: Le Zoo du Capitaine Bonhomme (TV series): Capitaine Bonhomme
- 1968: Capitaine Bonhomme (TV series): Capitaine Bonhomme
- 1969–1974: Quelle famille! (TV series): Grand-père
- 1970: Le cirque du Capitaine (TV series): Capitaine Bonhomme
- 1975: Don't Push It (Pousse mais pousse égal)
- 1976: Chère Isabelle (TV series)
- 1976–1977: Pour tout l'monde (TV series): Capitaine Bonhomme
- 1992: Coup de chance (TV)
