= MetroStar Award =

French-Canadian award for television

The MetroStar Award (French: Prix MetroStar) was presented for achievements in French-Canadian (Québécois) television and was based on popular vote. Many notable Québécois performing artists have been honored with this award; for example, Céline Dion in 1988 and Roy Dupuis in 1991, 1992, and 2003.

The sponsorship of this award (Metro Inc.) and its name were changed in 2006, when the Prix MetroStar became the Prix Artis (Artis Award).

== See also ==
- Canadian television awards
