= Claudine Mercier =

Québécoise comedian, singer, actress and impressionist

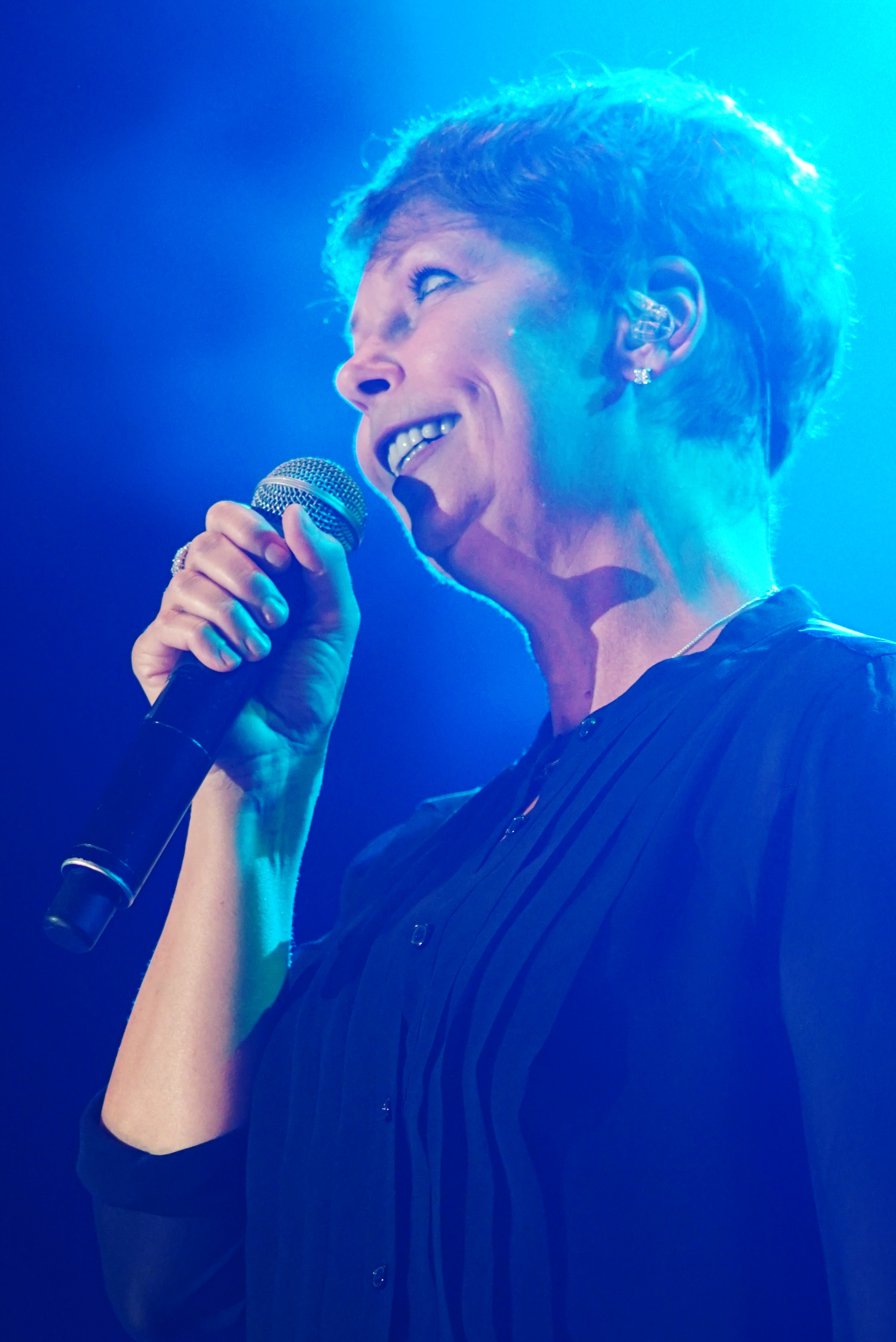
Claudine Mercier during a festival in 2017

Claudine Mercier (born November 3, 1961) is a Québécoise comedian, singer, actress and impressionist.

Mercier began her performing career in the early-80's singing with the a cappella vocal group Artishows for several years, and with Canadian singer Norman Iceberg. After graduating from the Université du Quebec a Montreal (UQAM) (Drama Major) in 1989, she went on to become one of Quebec's most prominent comedians.

In 1993, she gained widespread recognition in Quebec with her first One Woman Show. Best known for duplicating celebrities such as Irish singer Sinéad O'Connor, Madonna, and Quebec businesswoman Lise Watier, she also eventually won critical acclaim in Europe. She has received numerous nominations and awards, including one Felix in 1998, and three Olivier in 1999 for her second One Woman Show.

In 2003, Mercier's third One Woman Show included new impressions, and was well attended.

In 2005, Claudine Mercier made her film debut, playing four different characters in the popular Idole Instantanée - directed by Yves Desgagnés, and produced by Denise Robert.
