= Guy A. Lepage =

Canadian comedian, actor, talk show host, and producer (born 1960)

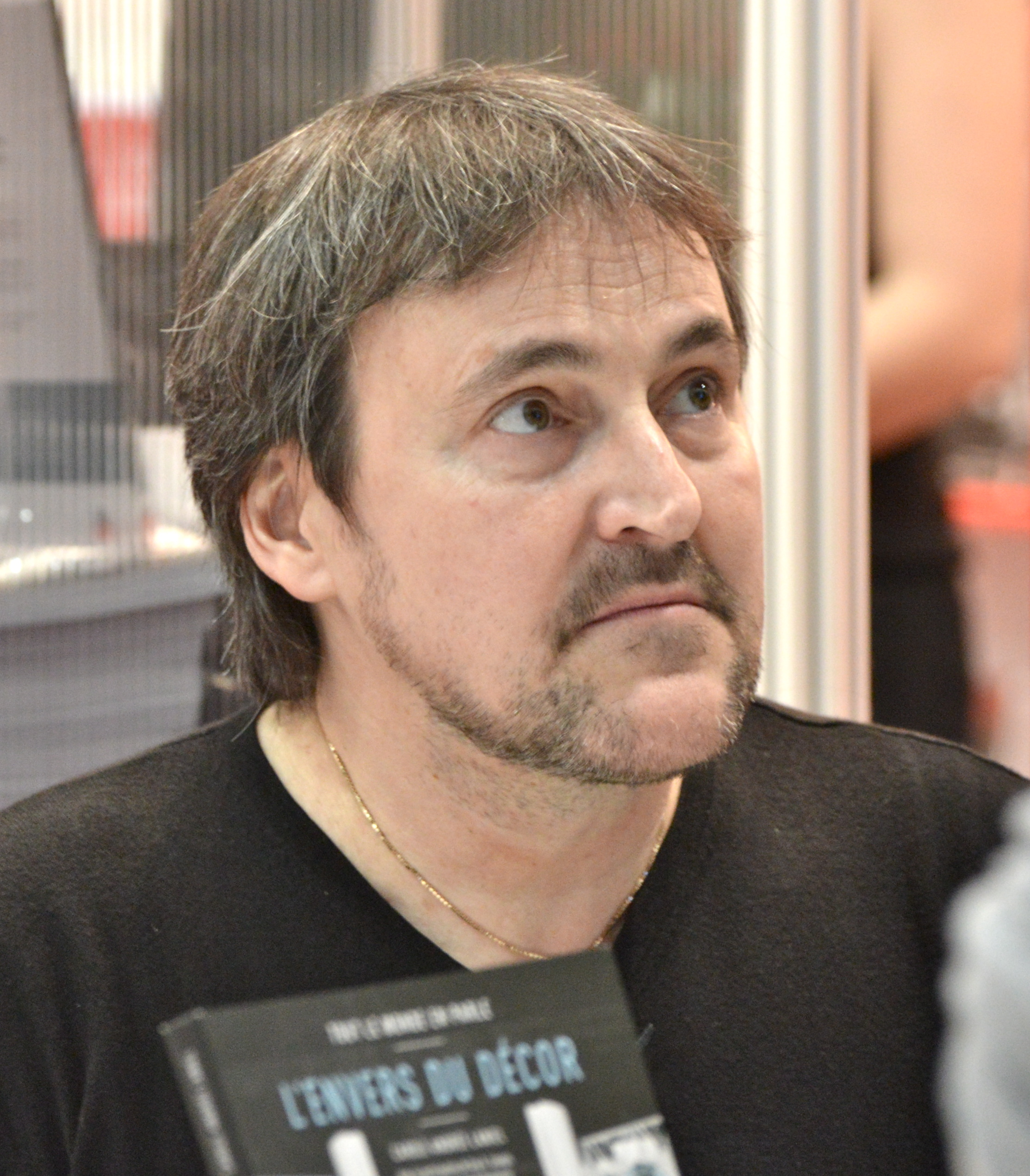
- Lepage in 2015
- Born: Guy Antoine Lepage; 30 August 1960 (age 64); Montreal, Canada
- Occupations: Comedian; actor; talk show host; producer
- Notable work: In 2014, Maclean's magazine ranked him sixth in the list of the 50 most important people in Canada.

Guy A. Lepage (French: [ləpaʒ]; born Guy Antoine Lepage, 30 August 1960) is a Canadian comedian, actor, talk show host, and producer.

== Career ==
Lepage was one of the five founding members of the Quebec comedy group Rock et Belles Oreilles (which also included Yves Pelletier, Bruno Landry and André Ducharme), and remained with the group from 1981 to 1995.

Lepage became a popular media mogul and TV series director in Quebec in the early 2000s. He created and starred alongside Sylvie Léonard in the popular sitcom Un gars, une fille ("A guy, a girl"), and appeared in the comedy films Happy Camper (Camping sauvage), The Bait (L'Appât) and The Bossé Empire (L'Empire Bo$$é). He then followed up with the talk show Tout le monde en parle ("Everybody's Talking About It"), which is closely related to the popular show of the same name in France; most members of the show's panel were stand-up comics or talk-show hosts. In 2014, Maclean's magazine ranked him sixth in the list of the 50 most important people in Canada.
