= Laurent Paquin =

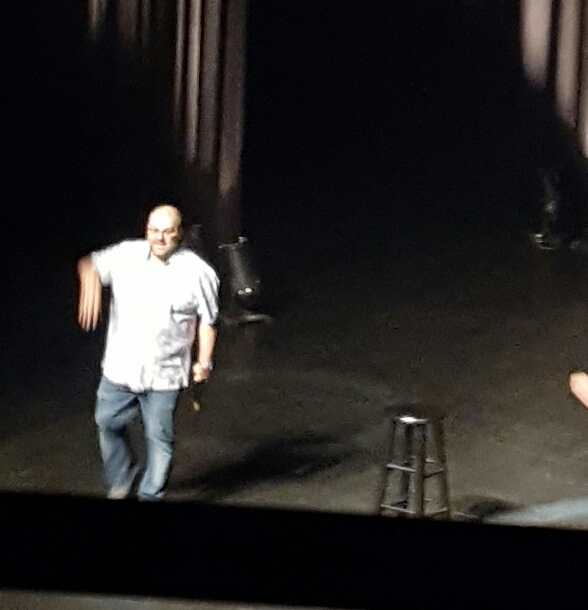

Laurent Paquin (born September 21, 1971 in Longueuil, Quebec, Canada), is a comedian and radio personality from Quebec.

== Bibliography ==
Paquin has hosted several galas for the Just for laughs festival in Montreal, Quebec. He also played in the comedy musical Chicago presented at the Casino de Paris and in Montreal. He also worked on commercials for Bell Canada, where he is the voice of the beaver named Bertrand. He also played in the television series Histoires de filles. Paquin performs in two active shows: Première impression, and Tout est relatif.

He cohosts the show Lève-toi et marche with Guy Jodoin, Patrice Bélanger and Karine Robert on Montreal radio station CKOI-FM.

He has a son named Albert.

== Discography ==
- 2012: Chante Laurent Paquin #70 CAN
