= Mario Jean =

Canadian comedian and actor (born 1965)

Mario Jean (born February 10, 1965) is a comedian and actor who has appeared in movies and television shows produced in Quebec, Canada. He first became known for his performance in l'ombre de l'épervier. He played in eleven television shows, four movies, two plays and he animated numerous radio stations.

From 1999 to 2009, he earned three awards in Gala des Oliviers and three awards in gala ADISQ. He also hosted those galas a few times.
