= Masked Avengers (duo) =

Canadian radio duo

The Masked Avengers, or Les Justiciers Masqués, are a Canadian radio duo from Montreal, Quebec, made up of disc jockeys and comedians Sébastien Côté-Trudel and Marc-Antoine Audette, known for making prank calls to famous persons by pretending to be government officials or officers in charitable organizations. Working mostly in French, except for their international prank calls, they appear on the afternoon program Les Cerveaux de l'info on CKOI-FM in Montreal.

Past victims of their pranks have included Gilles Duceppe, rock stars Bono and Mick Jagger, Microsoft founder Bill Gates, Formula One driver Jacques Villeneuve, U.S. business tycoon Donald Trump, and 2008 United States Republican vice-presidential candidate Sarah Palin. The duo have also been incorrectly credited with a prank call to Queen Elizabeth II in 1995, which was in fact placed by another CKOI-FM host, Pierre Brassard, from Les Bleu Poudre.

Audette and Trudel met as classmates at Collège Jean-de-Brébeuf in Montréal.

== Notable pranks ==
At a campaign appearance in Joliette during the 2004 election campaign, the duo — accompanied by a mascot in a tiger costume — presented Bloc Québécois leader Gilles Duceppe with a petition demanding the reduction of gasoline prices.

In August 2005, the pair got Britney Spears to take a call by pretending to be Céline Dion (they claim to have previously pranked Dion herself). As Dion, they proposed to Spears that "Tiger Woods, one of my personal friends, just promised me he's going to sing a very special song in duo with you and it's going to be called 'Let's Make a Hole in One'", to which Spears responded with enthusiasm.

On January 27, 2006, they tricked Jacques Chirac into believing that he was speaking to new Canadian Prime Minister Stephen Harper, a prank which Chirac took with good humour. The BBC rated this particular prank one of the 30 best moments in radio history of all time. In early May 2007, they called newly elected French President Nicolas Sarkozy, again posing as Stephen Harper.

=== Sarah Palin ===
The duo pranked American vice-presidential nominee Sarah Palin on November 1, 2008. Posing as Sarkozy, their discussion with Palin touched on politics, Sarkozy's wife Carla Bruni, hunting by helicopter — "Like we say in French, on pourrait tuer des bébé phoques aussi" ("We could kill baby seals also") — and the perils of hunting with Dick Cheney. Although the caller identified Sarkozy's advisor on American relations as Johnny Hallyday, and also named Stef Carse as the Prime Minister of Canada and their Les Cerveaux de l'info co-host Richard Z. Sirois as the Premier of Quebec, (Note: Although the term they used was in fact "Prime Minister of Quebec", this is merely an atypical usage and not an inherently incorrect or deliberately misleading one. While Canadian English has a usage convention of reserving the title "Prime Minister" for the Prime Minister of Canada and using "Premier" for the equivalent position in a province or territory, in their actual meanings the terms are strictly interchangeable. Furthermore, Canadian French does not have separate words for the two positions, using premier ministre for both — accordingly, when speaking English, Canadian francophones will often refer to the prime minister of a province.) Palin remained unaware during the six-minute call that it was a prank. They also referred to the Hustler porn film Who's Nailin' Paylin? as a documentary about Palin, to which the real Palin replied, "Oh good, thank you." The call to Palin was vetted by her foreign policy aide, Stephen E. Biegun, who took full responsibility for allowing the vice presidential candidate to take the call.

=== George W. Bush ===
According to sources revealed on April 1, 2009, The Masked Avengers tricked the staff of the White House in 2007, while George W. Bush was still president of the United States. Calling from Montreal through Paris, France, to avoid being traced back, The Masked Avengers posed as aides to President Sarkozy, tricking a White House operator into giving a direct phone number to the Situation Room, so they could speak with President Bush. However, the real Sarkozy had already spoken to Bush earlier in the day. The pranksters gave an alibi, saying that he would like to give Bush support, and wanted to talk more about it. After getting through to the Situation Room, they were asked to call back in 15 to 20 minutes—the operator even gave the pranksters the direct phone number.

The censored recording of the prank was not made public until April Fool's Day 2009, when CKOI aired the stunt. The delay was due to an agreement with the US government to wait until Bush has left office, due to security concerns.
