= Yves Pelletier =

Canadian film director, actor, and comedian (born 1961)

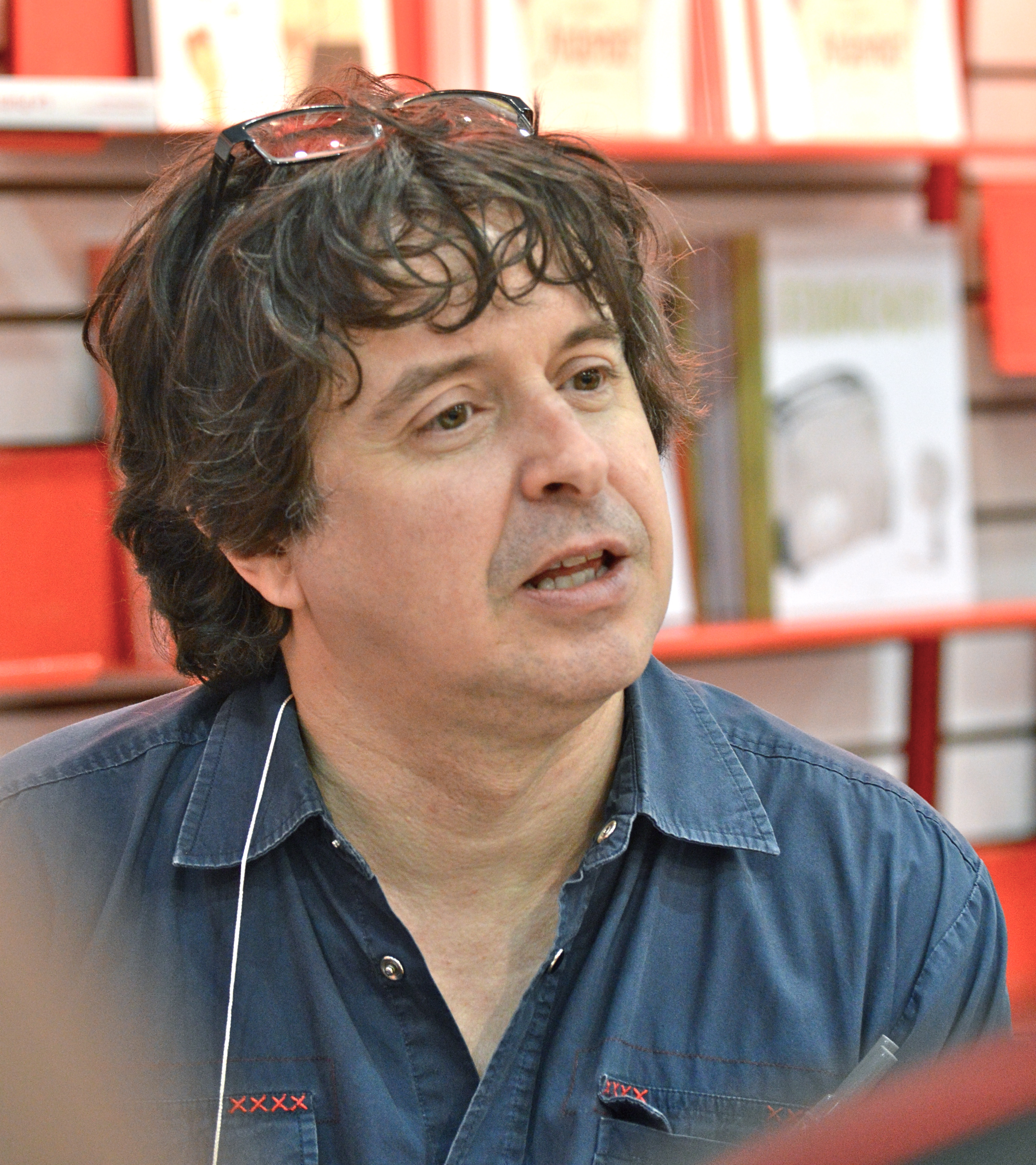
- Pelletier in 2015
- Born: 15 January 1961 (age 64); Laval, Canada
- Occupations: Actor; comedian; film director

Yves P. Pelletier (born 15 January 1961) is a Canadian film director, actor, and comedian. He was part of comedy troupe Rock et Belles Oreilles from 1981 to 1995. He appeared in a number of films and on television. He made his debut as a movie director with the 2004 film Love and Magnets (Les Aimants) followed by Face Time (Le Baiser du Barbu) in 2010.

== Early life ==
Pelletier was born in Laval, Quebec.

== Career ==
He first began to work for the comedy troupe Rock et Belles Oreilles (RBO) from their debut in 1981 up to the group's separation in 1995. He is well known for his Monsieur Caron and Stromgol characters in the series, and for the use of absurd humour.

He has also made appearances in the following Quebec films:

- Ding et Dong, le film - 1990
- Letters of Transit (Les Sauf-conduits) - 1991
- Karmina - 1996
- Karmina 2 - 2001
- Happy Camper (Camping Sauvage) - 2004
- Le cas Roberge - 2008
- The Bossé Empire (L'Empire Bo$$é) 2012

He appeared from time to time on the television series Un gars, une fille as Guy's friend named Yves. He also appeared in film adaptations of the Rock et Belles Oreilles series.

He made his debut as a movie director with his 2004 film Love and Magnets (Les Aimants) and released his second feature, Face Time (Le Baiser du Barbu) in June 2010.

== Writing ==
Yves Pelletier has written two comic books:

- Valentin, art by Pascal Girard, La Pastèque, 2010, ISBN 978-2-922585-91-9
- Le pouvoir de l'amour et autres vaines romances, art by Iris, La Pastèque, 2014, ISBN 978-2-923841-59-5
