= Normand Brathwaite =

Canadian actor

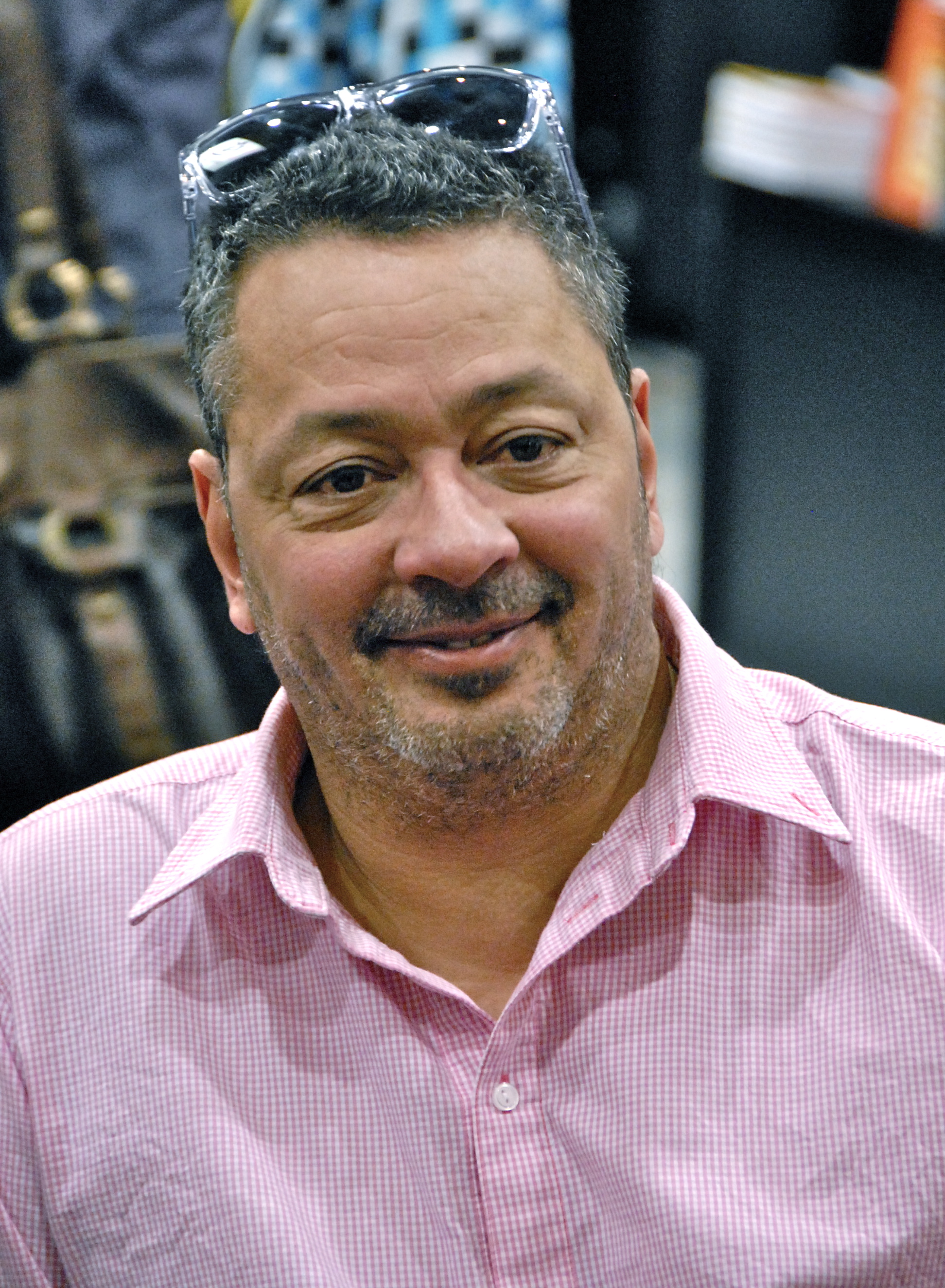
- Normand Brathwaite
- Born: August 27, 1958 (age 68); Montreal, Quebec, Canada
- Occupations: comedian, actor

Normand Brathwaite (born August 27, 1958) is a Quebec comedian, movie and television actor, radio and television host and musician. He is known for hosting television variety shows, including Piment Fort as well as the Montreal radio morning show Yé trop de bonne heure on CKOI-FM for 16 years.

== Background ==
After studying Theatre at Collège Lionel-Groulx, in Sainte-Thérèse, Quebec, Brathwaite started to participate in theatrical plays in 1977 and played in 1981 the musical comedy show La Cage aux folles.

From 1979 to 1991, he participated in several television shows as an actor including Chez Denise, L'Ingenieux Don Quichotte, Peau de banane and Le 101 Ouest Avenue des Pins as well as minor roles in a few movies such as The Moderns and If Only during the late 1980s.

His first role as a television host began in 1988 when he started a six-year stretch hosting Beau et Chaud. Starting in 1993, he was the host of the satirical and humor show Piment Fort which aired on TVA until 2001. While being one of the most popular evening shows in Quebec it was criticized for controversial content against various celebrities. After Piment Fort was removed from the TVA schedule, he hosted the TQS show Fun Noir.

He is currently the host of Télé-Quebec's Belle et Bum. He has also hosted several awards shows, such as the Gemini Awards for over ten years, as well as the Jutra Awards in 2006, 2007, and 2008. He also hosted several festivities and concerts related to Saint-Jean-Baptiste Day.

From 1990 to 2006, he hosted the CKOI-FM morning show Yé trop de bonne heure but left the station following major conflicts with co-host Jean-René Dufort.

Brathwaite was married to Quebec singer Johanne Blouin and has a daughter Élizabeth Blouin-Brathwaite who is also a singer. Brathwaite also has a son, Edouard Brathwaite. He was also a spokesperson for Muscular Dystrophy Canada Foundation as well as a current advertisement spokesperson for Réno-Dépôt and Kaizen Sushi Bar & Restaurant.

== Awards ==
Brathwaite received several awards including four consecutive Metro Star awards as the best host in a game show as well as Gemini Awards as the best host in a variety show in 1988, 1989 and 1992. The Académie canadienne du cinéma et de la télévision honored him in 2003 for his three Gemini Awards he won when he was the host of Beau et Chaud. During the 2006 Gemini Awards, he received an honorary award for his career.

== Filmography ==
=== Movie ===
- Qui a tiré sur nos histoires d'amour (1986)
- If Only (1987)
- The Moderns (1988)

=== Television ===
==== Actor ====
- Chez Denise (1979–1982)
- Jeune delinquant (1980)
- L'Ingénieux Don Quichotte (1981)
- Peau de banane (1982–1987)
- Le 101, ouest, avenue des Pins (1984–1985)
- CTYVON (1990)
- Denise... aujourd'hui (1991)

==== Host ====
- Beau et Chaud (1988–1994)
- Piment Fort (1993–2001, 2016–2018)
- Cadillac Rose (1997-1998)
- Fun Noir (2001-2004)
- Gemini Awards (gala) (1988, 1990–2002)
- Le Match des Etoiles (2005-2009)
- Jutra Awards (gala) (2006-2008)
- Belle et Bum (2003–present)
- Privé de sens (2011-2013)

==== Other ====
- Chanteurs masqués (2021)

=== Radio ===
- Mix 80 (2011–2014)
- Tout un retour (2008–2011)
- Yé trop de bonne heure (1990–2006)
