= Bruno Landry =

- Born: January 24, 1959 (age 66)
- Occupation(s): comedian, humorist

Bruno Landry is a Québécois comedian and humorist. He was part of the humor group Rock et Belles Oreilles from 1981 to 1995.
