= André Ducharme =

Canadian author and comedian (born 1961)

André Ducharme (born 23 July 1961) is a Canadian author, comedian, and humorist from Quebec. He was a member of the musical comedy group Rock et Belles Oreilles from 1981 to 1995.
