= List of programs broadcast by Ici Radio-Canada Télé =

This is a list of television programs broadcast by the Canadian Broadcasting Corporation's French language television network, Ici Radio-Canada Télé. For programs on the CBC's English network, see List of programs broadcast by CBC Television.

== # ==
- 0340
- 14, rue de Galais (1954–1957)
- 19-2 (2011–2015)
- 30 vies (2011–2016)
- 3600 secondes d'extase

== A ==
- À cause de mon oncle
- Albator, le corsaire de l'espace
- ALF
- Animaniacs
- Arthur
- Astro Boy
- Au nom de la loi (2005)
- Aux portes du cauchemar
- Au pays de l'arc-en-ciel
- L'auberge du chien noir
- Les Aventures de Seaspray

== B ==
- Bagatelle
- Ballades et chansons
- La Bande à Ovide
- Barbapapa
- Beau temps, mauvais temps
- Beautés désespérées
- Les Beaux Dimanches (1966–2004)
- Les Belles Histoires des pays d'en haut (1956–1970)
- Bob l'éponge
- Bobino
- Bonjour Sesame (1975–1976)
- La bonne aventure
- Les Bougon
- Les Boys
- Les Brigades du Tigre
- Les Brûlés
- Bugs Bunny
- Bye Bye

== C ==
- C.A.
- Les Cadets de la forêt
- Canada Vignettes
- Candy
- Capitaine Caverne
- Catherine
- Ce soir, on chante
- C'est comme ça que je t'aime
- Chapeau melon et bottes de cuir
- Chartrand et Simonne
- Cher Oncle Bill
- Les Chiboukis
- Cineastes de la faune
- Cirques du Monde
- Columbo
- Conseil-express
- Les Coqueluches
- Cosmos: 1999
- Les Coulisses du pouvoir
- Coup d'oeil
- La Course destination monde
- Cover Girl (2005)
- Le Crime d'Ovide Plouffe

== D ==
- D'Amour et d'eau fraiche
- D'hier à demain
- Daktari
- Dallas
- Daniel Boone
- Déclic
- Défi
- Le Défi mondial (1986)
- Découverte
- De ville en ville
- Demetan, la Petite Grenouille
- Discussions avec mes parents
- District 31
- Dre Grey, leçons d'anatomie
- Du cœur au ventre
- Duplessis

== E ==
- Empire, Inc.
- Les Enfants du 47A
- Enquête
- L'épicerie
- Et Dieu créa... Laflaque
- Un été dans le grand nord
- Les étoiles filantes

== F ==
- La facture
- La famille Plouffe
- Fanfreluche
- Prix Félix
- Félix et Ciboulette
- La Femme Bionique
- La femme d'aujourd'hui
- Fifi Brindacier
- Les Filles de Caleb
- Les Filles du Ciel
- La fine cuisine d'Henri Bernard
- Fleurs d'amour, fleurs d'amitié
- La Fosse aux lionne
- Fraggle Rock
- Francoeur
- Le Fric Show
- La Fureur

== G ==
- Galactica
- Un gars, une fille
- Génies en herbe
- Goldorak
- Grand-Papa
- Grands rires
- La Grosse vie

== H ==
- Les hauts et les bas de Sophie Paquin
- Les Héros du samedi
- Une heure sur terre
- Homme d'araignée: la nouvelle série de dessin animé

== I ==
- Il était une fois... l'Homme
- L'Incroyable Hulk
- Infoman
- Les Invincibles

== J ==
- Jamais deux sans toi
- La Job
- Les Jordache
- Le Jour du Seigneur

== K ==
- Kif-Kif

== L ==
- Lâcher prise (2017–present)
- Lakay Nou
- Lance et Compte
- Lassie
- Lingo

== M ==
- M pour musique
- Madame est servie
- Madame et son fantôme
- Magazine Culturel
- La Maison-Bleue
- La Maison de Ouimzie
- Marcus Welby
- Marguerite Volant
- Le match des étoiles
- Moi et l'autre
- Le moment de vérité
- Mona le vampire
- Le Monde en liberté
- Montreal Pop Concerts
- Les Moomins
- Le Muppet Show
- Les Muppets
- Le Mutant
- Mon Poisson Rouge!

== N ==
- Nic et Pic
- Le nouveau show
- Nouvelle adresse

== O ==
- L'Odyssée sous-marine de Jacques Cousteau
- Omerta

== P ==
- Paquet voleur
- Les Parent
- Passe-Partout
- Passion sports
- Patrouille du cosmos: série de dessin animé
- Petite merveille
- La Petite Patrie
- La Petite Vie
- Les Pierrafeu
- Le Point
- Point de mire
- Le Prince Saphir
- Propos et confidences
- Providence
- Prix Gémeaux

== R ==
- Les Recettes de Juliette
- Rencontres
- Les Rescapés
- Ricardo
- Robinson Suisse
- Rocquet Belles Oreilles
- Le roi Leo
- Roxy
- Rue des Pignons

== S ==
- Samedi de rire
- Scooby-Doo
- Second Regard
- La Semaine Verte
- Série noire
- Les Simpson
- La Soirée du hockey
- Sol et Gobelet
- Souris des villes, souris des champs
- Sous le signe du lion
- Sporthèque
- Les Supers Nanas
- Sur la côte du Pacifique
- Sur le vif

== T ==
- Tarzan
- Le Téléjournal
- Temps de chien
- Terre humaine
- Les Tisserands du pouvoir
- Toc toc toc
- Tom et Jerry
- Tortues Ninja : Les chevaliers d'écaille
- Toumai
- Tout le monde en parle
- Trauma
- Les Trouvailles de Clémence

== U ==
- L'Union fait la force
- Unité 9
- Univers inconnus
- Urgences

== V ==
- Le Vagabond
- Véro
- La Vie qui bat
- La vie secrète des animaux
- Virginie
- Vivre à trois

== W ==
- Walt Disney présente
- Walter et Tandoori
- Watatatow (1991–2005)
- Wickie
- Woody le Pic

== Y ==
- Yogi et compagnie
- Yogi l'Ours

== See also ==
- Lists of Canadian television series
