= List of French-language Canadian television series =

This is a non-exhaustive list of French-language television series from Canada. Most such television series are produced in Quebec, although a small number are also produced elsewhere in Canada. Series produced outside Quebec are noted below with a †.

For English Canadian series, see list of English-language Canadian television series.

== 0-9 ==
- 100 limites
- 14, rue de Galais - drama
- 19-2 - drama
- 2 laits, un sucre - talk show
- 450, Chemin du Golf - sitcom
- 60 second chorno - game show

== A ==
- À cause de mon oncle - comedy
- À la Di Stasio - cooking
- À table avec mon ex! - reality
- Action Réaction - game show
- Ad Lib - talk / comedy / variety
- L'Âge adulte - comedy-drama
- L'Amour est dans le pré
- Appelez-moi Lise
- Après OD - reality aftershow
- L'Arbitre - judge show
- Atomes Crochus - licensed French-language version of RTL's Match Game
- L'Attaque à 5 - sports news
- Aventures en nord
- Au secours de Béatrice
- Automania
- Aux frontières de l'inexpliqué - paranormal / documentary
- Avec le temps - comedy
- Avec un grand A - drama
- Les Aventures de Virulysse - children's

== B ==
- Le Bachelor - reality
- La Bande des Six
- BANDEÀPART.tv
- Le Banquier - licensed French-language version of Endemol's Deal or No Deal
- Les Beaux Dimanches
- Les Belles Histoires des pays d'en haut - téléroman
- Bibi et Geneviève
- Big Brother - reality
- Bleu Nuit - adult
- Les Bleus de Ramville † - sitcom
- Blindés
- Bob Gratton: Ma Vie, My Life - comedy (2007-2009)
- Bobino
- Les Bolés
- Bon Baisers de France
- Bon matin Chuck, ou l'art de réduire les méfaits
- Bootcamp: Le parcours extrême
- Box-office
- Les Bougon - satirical comedy (2004-2006)
- Les Brillant
- Bye Bye - sketch comedy

== C ==
- Ca fait la job - game show
- Caméra Café - comedy
- Catherine - sitcom
- Les Cents tours de Centour
- C'est comme ça que je t'aime - crime comedy
- Chambres en ville - soap opera (1989-1996)
- Chanteurs masqués - reality (2021)
- Chop Suey - TV Series (1986–1994)
- Ciel, mon Pinard! - cooking
- Le Cimetière des CD - music critic show
- Claire Lamarche - panel talk show
- Le Club des 100 Watts (1988–94)
- Le coeur a ses raisons - comedy soap opera parody (2005-2007)
- Comme dans l'espace - children's educational series
- Contact, l'encyclopédie de la création - documentary
- Cornemuse
- Les Coulisses du pouvoir - news
- La Course destination monde (1988-1999) - documentary, film competition
- Cover Girl - comedy
- Cré Basile - comedy

== D ==
- Les Dames de coeur - drama
- Dans une galaxie près de chez-vous - comedy / science fiction (1998-2001)
- Défi Mini Putt
- Le Défi mondial - documentary (1986)
- Discussions avec mes parents - comedy
- District 31 - drama
- Donnez au suivant
- Droit de Parole
- Dumont 360 - news
- Duplessis - historical drama
- Dutrizac - news

== E ==
- Entre chien et loup
- Entre deux draps
- Escouade 99 - comedy
- Et Dieu créa... Laflaque - comedy
- L'été indien - talk-show

== F ==
- Fanfreluche
- Félix et Ciboulette
- Les Filles de Caleb (1990–91)
- La Fin du monde est à 7 heures - satirical / sketch comedy (1997-2000)
- Fortier
- Les Franc-Tireurs - information / comedy
- Francoeur † - drama
- Le Fric Show - satirical news/variety
- Fugueuse - drama
- La Fureur - quiz / music

== G ==
- Un gars, une fille - sketch comedy (1997-2003)
- Go Diego!
- Génies en herbe - quiz
- Le Grand Blond avec un show sournois - talk / comedy / variety (2001-2003)
- Grande Ourse
- Grosse Vie
- La Guerre des clans - licensed version of RTL's Family Feud

== H ==
- Les hauts et les bas de Sophie Paquin
- L'Héritage
- Les Héritiers Duval

== I ==
- Iniminimagimo
- Les Invincibles

== J ==
- Jamais deux sans toi
- Jasmine
- JE - news
- Jean Duceppe
- Jeunesse d'aujourd'hui
- La Job - Quebec adaptation of the British-originated comedy The Office
- Gags Juste pour rire - comedy
- Le Gala Juste pour rire - comedy

== K ==
- Kif-Kif - teen
- km/h - sitcom

== L ==
- Lâcher prise - comedy
- Lakay Nou - comedy
- Lance et compte - hockey drama (1986-)
- Le sens du punch - comedy
- Loft Story - reality
- Like-moi! - sketch comedy

== M ==
- Macaroni tout garni - children's
- La Maison-Bleue - sitcom
- Le maître du jeu comedy/panel show
- Maman Dion - cooking
- Manon
- Marie-Soleil † - children's
- Méga TFO † - children's
- Mégantic - drama
- Mémoires Vives
- M'entends-tu? - drama/comedy
- Mensonges
- Météo+ † - sitcom
- Michaëlle - talkshow
- Mike Ward Show - comedy
- Milena Nova Tremblay
- Minibus
- Minuit, le soir
- Minute moumoutte - children's
- Mix Sonore - bilingual musical variety
- Moi et l'autre - sitcom
- Un monde à part
- Le monde de Charlotte
- Monsieur le ministre
- Monsieur Tranquille
- Montréal, ville ouverte - part non-fiction

== N ==
- Le National d'impro - improvisational comedy
- Nic et Pic
- Le nouveau show - sketch comedy
- Nouvelle adresse - drama
- La nuit où Laurier Gaudreault s'est réveillé - thriller drama

== O ==
- Occupation Double - reality
- Omertà (1996-1999)
- L'or du temps
- Les Oraliens

== P ==
- Paquet voleur - game show
- Le parc des braves
- Les Parent
- Parlez-Moi † - children's
- Passe-Partout - children's (1977–87)
- Patofville - children's
- Paul, Marie et les enfants
- Les Pays d'en haut - drama (2016-21)
- Peau de banane
- Pépino et Capucine
- La Petite Vie - sitcom (1993-1999)
- Pignon sur rue
- Piment Fort (1993-2001)
- Pin-Pon - children's (1996-1998)
- Les Plouffe
- Le Point - news
- Point de Mire - news / information
- Pokémon - anime (1998–present) (French dubbed)
- Providence

== Q ==
- Quatre coins de l'assiette - documentary - gourmet cooking

== R ==
- R-Force - children / teens
- Radisson - adventure
- Ramdam - children / teens
- Réal-TV - children / teens
- RelieF † - newsmagazine
- René Lévesque (1994)
- René Lévesque (2006)
- Les Rescapés
- Le retour d'Anna Brodeur - comedy
- Ricardo - cooking (2002-present)
- Robin et Stella (1988–92)
- Rock et Belles Oreilles - sketch comedy
- La Roue Chanceuse - game show
- Rue des Pignons
- Rumeurs - sitcom

== S ==
- St. Nickel † - comedy
- Samedi de rire - sketch comedy (1985-1989)
- Scoop - téléroman
- La semaine des 4 Julie - talk show (2020)
- Série noire - crime comedy-drama
- Simmone et Chartrand - historical drama
- SNL Québec - sketch comedy
- Soeur Angèle - cooking
- Les Soeurs Elliot - drama
- La Soirée du hockey - sports
- Sol et Gobelet - children's
- Sortez-moi de moi - thriller drama
- La Souris verte - children's
- Sous le signe du lion - drama
- Star Académie - licensed version of Endemol franchise Operacion Triunfo (Star Academy)
- Station X - drama/animated

== T ==
- Tactik - children / teens
- Tape-Tambour - children's
- Taquinons la planète - satirical / sketch comedy
- Taxi 0-22 - sitcom
- Téléfrançais! † - children's
- Le Téléjournal - news / information
- Temps de chien - comedy
- Le Temps d'une paix
- Terre humaine
- Les Tisserands du pouvoir
- Toi & Moi
- Le tournoi de mètres - game show
- Tous contre un - game show
- Tout le monde en parle - talk show (2004-)
- Toute la vérité
- Le Traboulidon - children's
- Trajectoires - documentary - retired NHL players
- Le travail à la chaine - game show
- Trauma - medical drama
- Le TVA 22 heures - news

== U ==
- Ultimatum
- L'Union fait la farce - original licensed French-language version of RTL's Match Game
- L'union fait la force - word games / quiz
- Unité 9

== V ==
- Vertige - drama
- La Vie, la vie
- Viens voir les comédiens
- Virginie - drama
- Volt † - youth news and culture magazine
- Les Voyages du tortillard

== W ==
- Walter et Tandoori - children's/animated
- Watatatow - children / teens (1991-2005)
- Wipeout Quebec - game show

== See also ==
- Culture of Quebec
- List of Quebec media
- List of Quebec movies
- List of French television series
- List of Quebec television series imports and exports
- Television of Quebec
