= List of programs broadcast by TVA =

This is a list of programs broadcast on TVA. TVA is a French language television network in Canada, which broadcasts over the air in Quebec and is available in the rest of Canada on cable.

== B ==
- Le Banquier
- Les Brillant
- Bugs Bunny et ses amis

== C ==
- Caméra Café
- Canadian Football League
- Chambres en ville
- Chanteurs masqués
- La classe de 5e
- Le cœur a ses raisons
- Cornemuse

== D ==
- Dieu merci!
- Double Défi
- Dr House

== E ==
- L'École des fans
- Esprits criminels
- L'Été indien / talk show
- L'expérience Messmer / variety show

== F ==
- Fais-moi un dessin
- Les Feux de L'amour
- Fort Boyard
- Fortier

== G ==
- Le Grand Blond avec un show sournois
- Grendizer

== H ==
- Les héros

== J ==
- JE
- Jeopardy!
- Juste pour rire

== K ==
- km/h

== L ==
- Lance et compte
- La liste noire: Rédemption
- Lol:-)

== M ==
- Maman Dion
- Monk

== N ==
- North American Soccer League

== O ==
- Occupation Double

== P ==
- Patof
- Les Pierrafeu
- Piment Fort
- Le Poing J
- La Poule aux œufs d'or

== Q ==
- Quoi de neuf, Bugs?

== R ==
- Le Recrue

== S ==
- Sailor Moon
- La série Montréal-Québec
- Shopping TVA
- Les Sœurs Elliot
- Star Académie

== T ==
- Taxi 0-22
- Teletubbies
- Top Modèles
- TVA Nouvelles

== U ==
- Ultimatum

== V ==
- Vertige
- La Voix

== Y ==
- Yamaska
