= André Cartier =

Canadian actor (1945–2020)

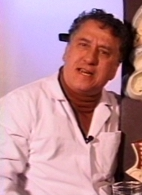
- Cartier in 2000
- Born: 24 December 1945
- Died: 22 May 2020 (aged 74); Dunham, Quebec, Canada
- Occupation: Actor

André Cartier (24 December 1945 – 22 May 2020) was a Canadian actor, known for playing André in the children's series Passe-Partout.

== Biography ==
As a child, Cartier appeared in the musical Les posters, written by Louis-Georges Carrier and Claude Léveillée and presented at the Théâtre du Rideau Vert. He became a published writer in 1997 with the novel Pays-Perdu. He founded the environmental group Vers un Idéal Écologique in 1988 alongside a group of citizens from Contrecœur. The establishment promoted a more environmentally conscious way of life for every citizen.

André Cartier died in Dunham on 22 May 2020 at the age of 74.

== Filmography ==
- La Cellule (1959)
- Les Oraliens (1969–1970)
- Sol et Gobelet (1969–1971)
- Quelle famille! (1969–1974)
- La Maison des amants (1972)
- Clak (1972–1974)
- Des armes et les hommes (1973)
- Taureau (1973)
- Bound for Glory (1975)
- Youhou (1975)
- Animagerie (1977–1980)
- Passe-Partout (1977)
- Pop Citrouille (1979–1985)
- Peau de banane (1982)
- Vaut mieux en rire (1982)
- La bonne aventure (1982)
- Entre chien et loup (1984–1992)
- Un homme (1997)
- Futur en direct (2000)
