= Shopping TVA =

Shopping TVA may refer to:

- Shopping TVA (TV channel), now Télé Achats, a Canadian French-language TV shopping channel
- Shopping TVA (TV program), a former Canadian French-language TV shopping show
