= Maryse Pelletier =

Canadian actress and writer (born 1946)

- Born: November 20, 1946 (age 79); Cabano, Quebec, Canada
- Education: Université de Moncton (BA); Université Laval; Conservatoire d'art dramatique de Montréal
- Occupations: Actress; writer

Maryse Pelletier (born November 20, 1946) is a Canadian actress and award-winning writer living in Quebec.

She was born in Cabano and received a BA from the Université de Moncton. She went on to study French, American and English literature at the Université Laval and theatre at the Conservatoire d'art dramatique de Montréal. During the 1970s, she performed in comedies at the Théâtre du Nouveau Monde, the Théâtre d'Aujourd'hui, the Théâtre du Trident and the Théâtre La Marjolaine. Pelletier wrote scripts for a number of Radio-Canada television series for youth, including Traboulidon and Iniminimagimo; these series received Genie Awards for children's programming. She also contributed to the series Tohu-Bohu and Les frimousses, as well as a series on illiteracy Graffiti.

From 1992 to 1996, she was director for the Théâtre populaire du Québec.

== Selected works ==
=== Plays ===
- Du poil aux pattes comme les CWACS (1982)
- Duo pour voix obstinées (1985), received the Prix littéraires du Journal de Montréal and the Governor General's Award for French-language drama

=== Novels ===
- La Musique des choses (1998), received the Médaille de la Culture française awarded by La Renaissance française
- Une vie en éclats (1997), finalist for a Governor General's Prize
- Un couteau sur la neige, received the Prix Alvine-Bélisle
