= Lol:-) =

- Genre: Comedy
- Starring: Sylvie Moreau; Réal Bossé; Martin Drainville; Antoine Vézina; Sharlene Royer; Julie Ménard
- Country of origin: Canada
- No. of seasons: 5 (6)
- No. of episodes: 56 (84)

Production
- Executive producer: Sylvain Parent-Bédard
- Producer: Groupe Fair-Play
- Cinematography: François L. Delagrave; André Perron
- Editor: Martin Gravel
- Camera setup: François L. Delagrave; André Perron
- Running time: 30 min

Original release
- Network: TVA
- Release: February 27, 2011 – present

LOL:-) is a Canadian silent comedy television series created by Pierre Paquin and Denis Savard. It premiered on February 27, 2011. The series stars Réal Bossé, Martin Drainville, Antoine Vézina, Sylvie Moreau, Sharlene Royer and Julie Ménard. It airs on The Comedy Network and CTV Two in English Canada.

LOL:-) presents visual comedy clips without dialogue. Each clip averages 15 to 90 seconds in length. Because the series has little to no dialogue, it can be sold in multiple markets without a language barrier; it is a staple series of the American Spanish-language network Estrella TV.
