= Sophie Cadieux =

Canadian actress

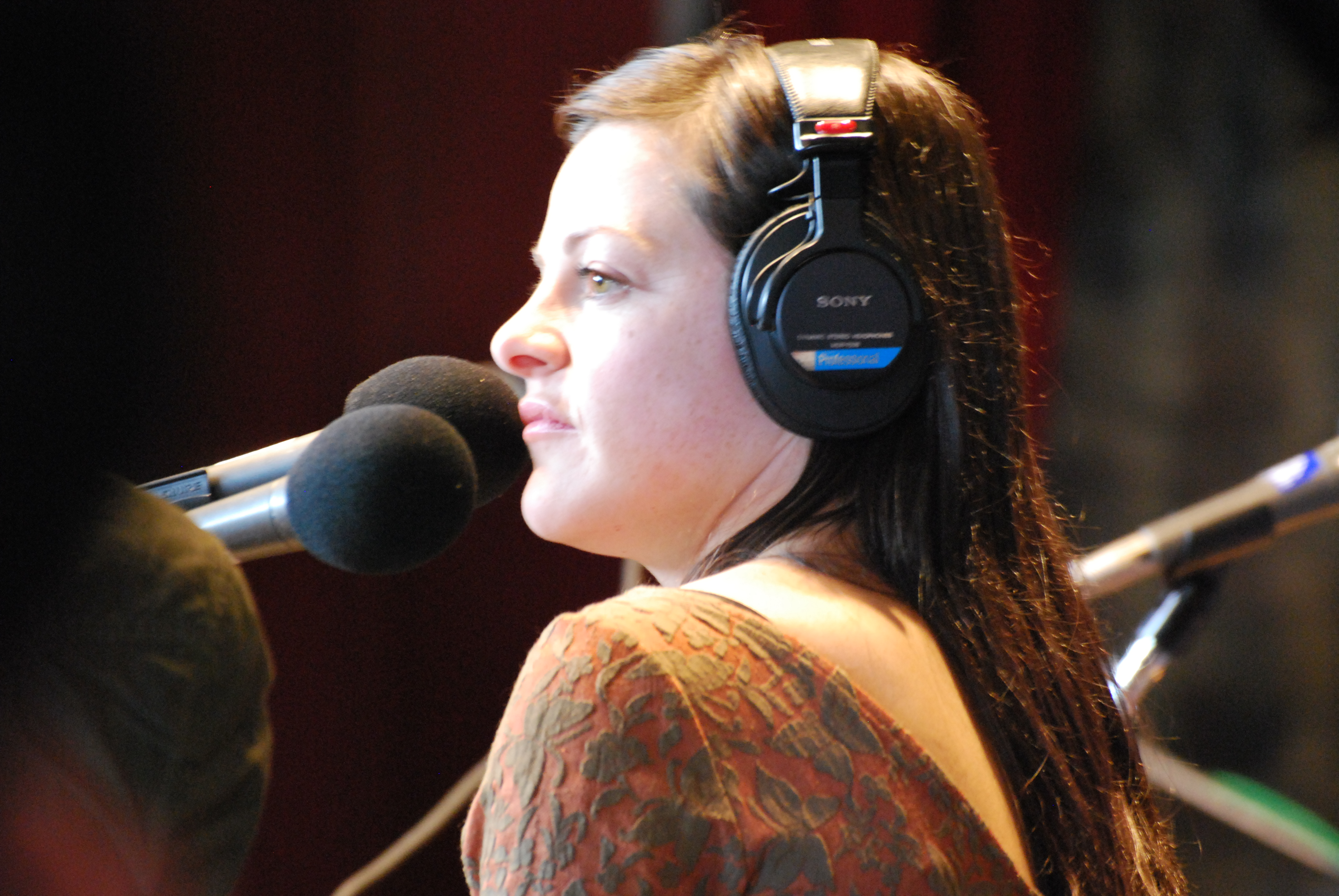
- Cadieux in 2012
- Born: August 25, 1977 (age 49)
- Education: Conservatoire d'art dramatique de Montréal
- Occupation: Actress
- Years active: 1999-present
- Children: Oscar (b. 2015)

Sophie Cadieux (born August 25, 1977) is a Canadian actress from Quebec. She is most noted for her role as Valérie Danault in the television series Lâcher prise, for which she won the Prix Gémeaux for Best Actress in a Comedy Series in 2017, 2018 and 2020.

She studied theatre at the Conservatoire d'art dramatique de Montréal from 1998 to 2001. She has an improvisational theater background from her time in the Quebec improvisational leagues of the Mouvement d'improvisation de Montmorency (MIM), the Limonade, the Ligue d'improvisation montréalaise (LIM), the Cravates, and the renowned Ligue nationale d'improvisation (LNI).

== Honours ==
=== Awards ===
- Prix Gémeau for best interpretation in a supporting role of a youth television program (for her work in Watatatow, 2004)
- Pierre Curzi Trophy for rookie of the year of the Ligue nationale d'improvisation (2002)

=== Nominations ===
- Prix Gémeau for best interpretation in a supporting role of a youth television program (for her work in Watatatow, 2003)

== Theater work ==
- Toccate et Fugue (Centre du Théâtre d'Aujourd'hui, 2017)
- Betty à la plage (Maison de la Culture, 2003; Théâtre La Licorne, 2004)
- Cette fille-là (Licorne, 2004–2006; Quebec-wide tour, 2006)
- Les Belles-soeurs (Théâtre Profusion, 2003)
- Unity 1918 (Théâtre Espace Go, 2003)
- Bouba Bouba (SMCQ, 2002–2003)
- Les femmes de bonne humeur (Salle Fred Barry, 2002)
- Avec le soleil, ...la mère (Théâtre du Tandem, 2001)
- Le bourgeois gentilhomme (Centre d’Art d’Orford, 2001)
- Théâtre de rue en France (Théâtre de l'Astheure, 2000)
- Théâtre de rue Espagne (Théâtre de l'Escargot, 2000)

== Filmography ==
=== Movies ===
- Quatres personnes ordinaires dans une mini-fourgonnette standard – 1999
- Écrase bonhomme, t'es dans l'coup – 2000
- Les petits Cagney – 2001
- Duo – 2003
- Funkytown – 2010
- Silence Lies (Tromper le silence) – 2010
- Suspicions (Jaloux) – 2010
- An Extraordinary Person (Quelqu'un d'extraordinaire) – 2013
- Snowtime! – 2015
- 9 (9, le film) – 2016
- Mon ami Walid - 2019
- Humanist Vampire Seeking Consenting Suicidal Person (Vampire humaniste cherche suicidaire consentant) – 2023
- You Will Be Free (Ma fille tu seras libre) - 2026

=== Television ===
- Fortier III (2001)
- Café Bédé (2001)
- Watatatow (2001–2002)
- Rumeurs (2002–2003)
- Temps dur (2003)
- La chambre No 13 (2004)
- Il était une fois dans le trouble (2004)
- La Job (2006)
- Tactik (2007)
- Fred's Head (2008)
- Les Lavigueur, la vraie histoire – 2008
- Adam et Ève (2012)
- Lâcher prise (2017–2020)

== See also ==
- List of Quebec actors
- Ligue nationale d'improvisation
- Television of Quebec
- Culture of Quebec
