= Trans-Canada Air Lines Flight 831 =

1963 plane crash in Quebec, Canada

- The crash site of Flight 831

Occurrence
- Date: November 29, 1963
- Summary: Unknown; possible systems failure, most probable cause PTC (Pitch Trim Compressor) failure and possible hydraulic stall due to high speeds reached at descent
- Site: Ste-Thérèse-de-Blainville (near Montreal-Dorval Airport), Quebec, Canada; 45.6813°N 73.8984°W

Aircraft
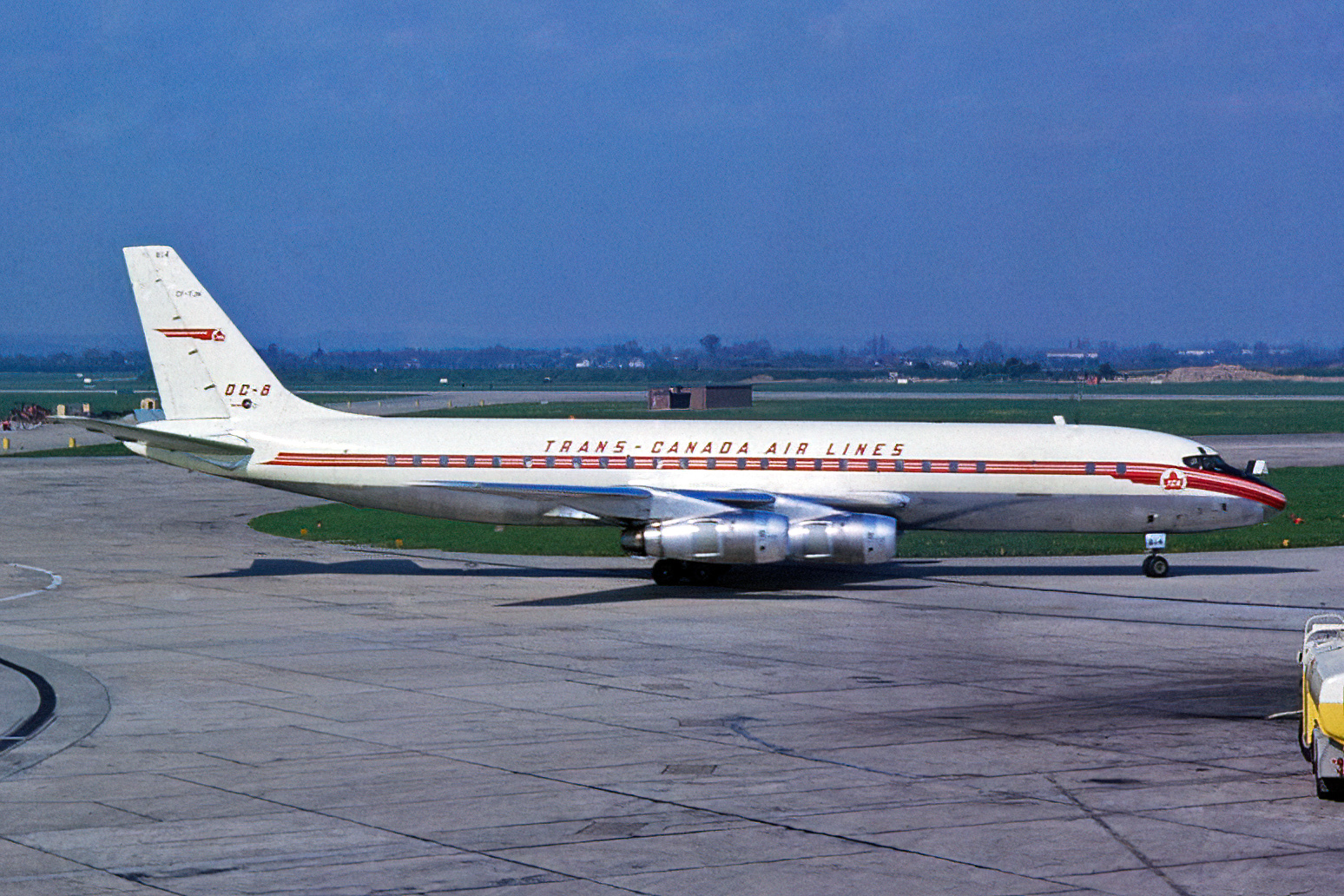
- CF-TJN, the aircraft involved in the accident, pictured six months before accident
- Aircraft type: Douglas DC-8-54CF Jet Trader
- Operator: Trans-Canada Air Lines
- Call sign: TRANS-CANADA 831
- Registration: CF-TJN
- Flight origin: Montreal-Dorval International Airport
- Destination: Toronto International Airport
- Occupants: 118
- Passengers: 111
- Crew: 7
- Fatalities: 118
- Survivors: 0

Trans-Canada Air Lines (TCA) Flight 831 was a scheduled Canadian flight from Montréal–Dorval International Airport to Toronto International Airport on November 29, 1963. About five minutes after takeoff in poor weather, the Douglas DC-8-54CF Jet Trader operating the flight crashed about 32 km (20 mi) north of Montreal, near Ste-Thérèse-de-Blainville, Quebec, Canada, killing all 111 passengers and seven crew members. The crash was the deadliest in Canadian history at the time. It was also the deadliest crash of a DC-8 at the time, and, as of 2025, the sixth-deadliest.

== Aircraft ==
The aircraft involved was a Douglas DC-8 54CF series, powered by four Pratt & Whitney JT3D engines and delivered new to Trans-Canada Air Lines nine months prior to the accident. The aircraft was registered CF-TJN and was the 179th DC-8 built at the Long Beach, California assembly plant. The 50 series was the same length as the original DC-8 but with more efficient turbofan engines.

== Sequence of events ==
At 6:28 p.m., the DC-8 began its takeoff roll on Dorval airport's Runway 06R. The crew reported back when they reached 3,000 feet (910 m) and were given clearance for a left turn. Shortly thereafter, the aircraft deviated from its expected flight path and began a quick descent. At about 6:33 p.m., the jet struck the ground at an estimated 470–485 knots (870–898 km/h; 541–558 mph) while descending at about a 55-degree angle (± 7 degrees).

The aircraft plunged into a soggy field in Sainte-Thérèse, Quebec, about 100 metres (300 ft) from the main highway that leads to the Laurentian Mountains. One witness said that he saw what looked like "a long red streak in the sky" just before the crash. The red-trimmed, silver jet dug a crater 2 metres (6 ft) deep and 50 metres (150 ft) wide in the ground that soon began to fill with rainwater. Although parts of the airplane were scattered over a wide area ahead of and separate from the crater, the commission of inquiry found that the aircraft was structurally intact when it struck the ground.

== Emergency response ==
The site of the crash was a flat field away from houses in the town of 12,000 people. The main sections of the wreckage lay about halfway between Highway 11, now Quebec Route 117, and the Laurentian Autoroute (Quebec Highway 15). Rescue parties were hampered by deep mud around the wreckage, and by a fuel-fed fire that lasted for hours despite heavy rain.

== Investigation ==
The investigation was complicated by the severe damage to the plane and the fact that the plane did not have cockpit voice recorders or flight data recorders, which were not required in Canada at the time. Although the official report released in 1965 could not determine the cause of the accident, it pointed to problems in the jet's pitch trim system (the device that maintains a set nose-up or nose-down attitude) as a possibility, as a pitch trim problem caused the similar crash of Eastern Air Lines Flight 304, another DC-8, three months after the crash of Flight 831. Other suggested possible causes that could not be ruled out included icing of the pitot system and failure of the vertical gyro.

== Victims ==
The crash killed all 118 people on board, 111 passengers and 7 crew members. Of the victims, 76 were from the Metropolitan Toronto area and three were foreign nationals (two Americans and one Indian). A Trans-Canada Air Lines official said that "the bodies were so badly smashed that identification was virtually hopeless." The plane's flight crew included 47-year-old captain John D. "Jack" Snider of Toronto, a World War II bomber pilot, 35-year-old first officer Harold J. "Harry" Dyck of Leamington, Ontario and 29-year-old flight engineer Edward D. Baxter of Toronto.

Traffic congestion on Montreal's main expressway, which extended all the way into the downtown core, caused eight people to miss the flight but also impeded emergency vehicles from reaching the crash site.

Among the victims were two employees of the Canadian Broadcasting Corporation (CBC) who had been in Montreal preparing a bilingual television variety show called A Show from Two Cities. As a consequence, the CBC public affairs series This Hour Has Seven Days began filming the aftermath and the investigations into the crash. In November 1965, the CBC broadcast the hour-long documentary which was watched by more than two million Canadians, but many victims' families avoided it, not wanting to revisit the tragedy.

Trans-Canada Air Lines, the predecessor to Air Canada, created a memorial garden near the site of the crash at the Cimetière de Sainte-Thérèse. The crash site is now within a residential neighbourhood.

Although it is customary for airlines to retire a flight number after a major incident, Air Canada continued to use flight number 831 for a route from Geneva to Toronto with a stopover in Montreal. However, this route number has since been changed to 835.

== See also ==
- List of accidents and incidents involving commercial aircraft
