= Sol (comedian) =

Fictional character created by Marc Favreau

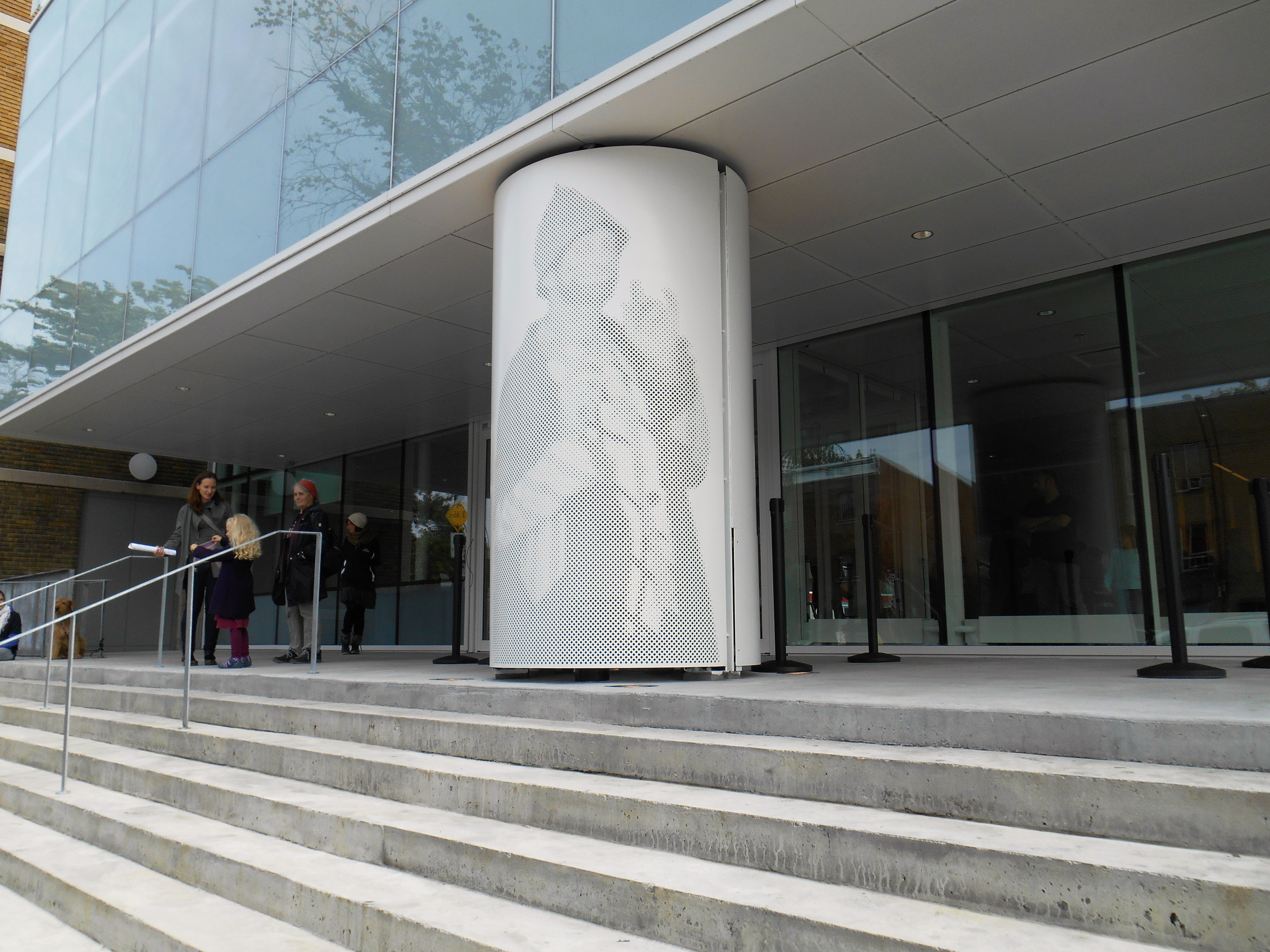
Bibliothèque Marc-Favreau in the Rosemont district of Montreal, featuring a mural of Marc Favreau in character as Sol.

Sol is a fictional character written for and performed on stage and television by the Canadian actor Marc Favreau.

Sol is a clown (tramp type) who handily deconstructs the French language, to the amusement of adults as well as children. In his stage performances, Sol mostly appeared alone and recited comic monologues dealing with current social and political issues.

Sol began as a regular on La Boîte à surprise, a long-running children's television show on the French language Radio-Canada network. At that time, the act was called Bim et Sol. The character proved popular so Marc Favreau developed Sol's monologues into a one-man show. Favreau then teamed up with another clown for Sol et Bouton. He also appeared on a popular television series called Sol et Gobelet opposite Luc Durand.

Sol also appeared on a television series on TVOntario called Parlez-moi, which taught basic French, as it is spoken in Quebec and other parts of Canada.

== See also ==
- Marc Favreau
- List of Quebec television series
- Television of Quebec
- Culture of Quebec
