= L'École des fans =

French television show

L'École des fans (French for School of Fans) was a French TV show that was hosted by Jacques Martin from 1976 to 1998 on Antenne 2 then France 2.

A number of children between the ages of three and ten took part in the show, during which Martin first asked them some questions and then invited each of them in turn to sing a song of the featured singer.

The other children then gave marks to their peers for their performance after which, if the marks were far-off, Martin would ask them why they give such and such mark, usually leading to funny or cute explanations. Then Martin would count the marks with the singer and, invariably, everyone won with the same mark. At the end of the show they would receive a number of gifts. This was a very children-friendly show.

Vanessa Paradis is likely the most well-known contestant: she appeared on the program in 1980, at age 7.

Since September 2009, L'École des fans has been hosted by Philippe Risoli, on Gulli.

== In Quebec ==
A Québécoise version of the programme with a similar format has aired on for French-Canadian audiences on the TVA network. It commenced in 2004 and continued until 2008, and was hosted by Quebec actor and broadcaster Charles Lafortune.

== See also ==
- List of French television series (France)
