= Kif-Kif =

Kif-Kif may refer to:

- Kif-Kif (organization), an LGBT rights organization in Spain
- Kif-Kif (TV series), a Quebec television series
