= Linda Wilscam =

Canadian actor, educator and writer (born 1949)

- Born: 1949 (age 76–77)
- Citizenship: Canada
- Education: Conservatoire d'art dramatique de Montréal
- Occupations: Actor, educator and writer
- Employer: McGill University

Linda Wilscam (born 1949) is a Canadian actor, educator and writer. She performed in the Radio Canada television series Picotine during the 1970s.

The daughter of Maurice Wilscam and Gabrielle Arsenault, she graduated from the Conservatoire d'art dramatique de Montréal in 1971. Wilscam created the character Picotine for summer theatre; she then adapted the character for television and appeared in the series of the same name from 1971 to 1976. She went on to teach theatre at McGill University and then taught at the Cégep de Sainte-Thérèse. From 1976 to 1995, she wrote scripts for a number of television series targeted at young people including Iniminimagimo, Alexandre et le Roi and Une faim de loup. In 1995, she began teaching at the Cégep de Saint-Hyacinthe.

She wrote a number of novels based on the Picotine television series:

- Picotine et l'Homme aux Ballons
- Picotine et le bout du monde
- Picotine et le Prince des vents
