= Simon Lacroix =

Simon Lacroix may refer to:

- Simon Lacroix (born 1984), Canadian film and television actor
- Komodo (Simon Lacroix), DC Comics character
