= Julie Ménard =

Canadian actress

Julie Ménard is Canadian actress from Montreal, Quebec. Her work has been mainly shown in francophone Quebec.

== Filmography ==
- 1998: Now or Never (Aujourd'hui ou jamais)
- 2000: Willie (TV series)
- 2001: So Faraway and Blue
- 2002: Le Collectionneur
- 2004-2008: Caméra café (TV series) as Josée Gamache
- 2004: La Vie rêvée de Mario Jean (TV)
- 2005: Dodging the Clock (Horloge biologique)
- 2005: Les Invincibles (TV series)
- 2005: Audition (L'Audition)
- 2010: C.A. (TV series) as Lily la voisine
- 2011: lol:-) (TV)
- 2013: Trauma (TV series) as Sylvie Bastien, 2 episodes
- 2016: Votez Bougon as Petronia Chagnon
- 2017: Cross My Heart as Simone St-Jean
- 2018: Le jeu (TV series) as Pédopsychiatre, 1 episode
- 2018: District 31 (TV series) as Christine Power, recurring role
- 2020: Les Mecs (TV series) as Noémie, main cast
