= La Job =

Quebec sitcom

- Cast of La Job.
- Created by: Ricky Gervais; Stephen Merchant
- Starring: Antoine Vézina; Sébastien Huberdeau; Sophie Cadieux; Paul Ahmarani
- Opening theme: Handbags and Gladrags (remade by Alain Simard)
- Country of origin: Canada
- Original language: French
- No. of episodes: 13

Production
- Producers: Anne-Marie Losique; Marc Trudeau
- Production locations: Saint-Laurent, Quebec, Canada
- Camera setup: Single camera
- Running time: 30 minutes (with commercials)
- Production companies: Capital United Nations Entertainment; The Identity Company

Original release
- Network: Bell Satellite TV
- Release: October 9, 2006 – January 15, 2007

La Job is a Canadian French-language comedy television series set in Montreal, Quebec. It is an adaptation of the British show The Office. Produced by Anne-Marie Losique's Image Diffusion International, it has been broadcast for a limited number of viewers on Bell Satellite TV satellite television, beginning on October 9, 2006 and ended on December 25, 2006 for 12 episodes until a bonus epilogue episode aired on January 15, 2007. It was later seen by a wider audience on the public broadcaster Radio-Canada (starting in January 2007) and specialty channel ARTV (starting in the third quarter of the same year). It is the third official foreign adaptation of the concept, and the second in a language other than English.

== Synopsis ==
National industry leader Les Papiers Jennings, a multinational carton and packaging company, is restructuring. The regional manager of their branch on Côte-de-Liesse, Saint-Laurent, in Montreal, is David Gervais (the name is an homage to Ricky Gervais, and his original character David Brent). He will need to compete with the Terrebonne branch and operate an important effort to avoid the shut-down of their branch. He will also have to cope with occasionally rebellious employees.

David is a failed comedian and rocker who also fails to grasp the notion of political correctness. He tends to either make a fool of himself in front of the office crew or make it intensely uncomfortable. The one who seems to enjoy him the most is Sam Bisaillon, former army cadet who worships David. He shares his desk with Louis Tremblay, who is secretly in love with the shy receptionist Anne Viens. The problem is that Anne is engaged to Luc, a macho warehouse employee.

== Production ==
The Office had already seen foreign adaptation with the American The Office, the French Le Bureau and the quasi-official German version Stromberg. Image Diffusion International produced the Québécois version. IDI co-founder Anne-Marie Losique, a well-known television host and producer, says "I saw the original show on DVD and found that it was one of the most risqué and extraordinary shows ever. For me, it's a cult classic ... we've stayed very faithful to the British series ... [Like the original series], the show is also set in the suburbs where nothing ever happens". Surprisingly, Losique claimed that she bought the concept for only $5,000, according to a 2005 article in Le Soleil. She has mentioned that French television station Canal+ has shown interest in this version, despite already producing and broadcasting the French one. Losique already made herself known for importing shows like the American The Simple Life (called La Vie rurale in its Quebec version, its first exportation) starring herself and pop singer Jacynthe and The Surreal Life (Des gens pas ordinaires).

Like the British Office, La Job takes the form of a mockumentary. Twelve episodes for the first season began shooting on July 10, 2006 and wrapped-up six weeks later, with a budget of less than Can$200,000 each and filmed in high-definition. For its first season, as its French counterpart, La Job has adapted directly from the British scripts, rather than creating new ones like in the United States (although the American version did adapt the first episode in this fashion). Initially, there was hesitation over whether to call the show "Le Bureau" (a direct translation identical to the French version) or "La Job" (a Quebec French franglais colloquialism, not a proper French word, for "job"; it exists in France, but in the masculine rather than feminine form). Eventually, La Job was chosen. Reports in the media of the name "Le Job" were mistakes.

André St-Pierre is the director of the episodes. He is best known as the co-director of the Télé-Québec show Les Francs-Tireurs and La Job was his first fiction. Script adaptation was given to Ian Lauzon and Jean-Philippe Granger was made screenwriter. Like the American Office, improv veterans were called to fill the shoes of some of the original actors. The role of the David Brent boss was entrusted to Antoine Vézina, a performer of the reputed Ligue nationale d'improvisation (LNI), a Quebec-born concept of improvisational theatre and international improv team competition (Quebec, France, Belgium, Switzerland and Italy). Sophie Cadieux, who holds the role corresponding to Dawn Tinsley, has also taken part in the LNI. Paul Ahmarani, playing La Job's Gareth Keenan, is a great fan of the British series. About the black humor of the show, he comments: "Personally, when I began watching that show, after five minutes, I knew that I had before my eyes something unique, that would literally shatter all that we had seen before". On his character, he sums up that "I'm someone that is very much of a coward, so I like to take refuge in military fantasies of virility... I really like to say that I spent three years in the army... I'm a bit of a loser, very right-wing, very militarist". Sébastien Huberdeau, the Tim Canterbury equivalent, was seen on international screens in The Barbarian Invasions, winner of the 2004 Academy Award for Best Foreign Language Film.

It was reported that Anne-Marie Losique made the surprising choice of making Luc Provost audition for the Gareth Keenan character. Provost is better known as the flamboyant drag queen Mado Lamotte. He had just wrapped up shooting Losique's Des gens pas ordinaires when the offer was made. Irony would have been striking for the openly gay Provost playing the slightly homophobic character. He ultimately did not obtain the role.

== Reality and fiction ==
Reality and fiction sometimes meet in La Job, like in its American counterpart. The actual studios are located on Côte-de-Liesse (part of the Saint-Laurent borough in Montreal), near Autoroute 20, where the Papiers Jennings branch is located in the series. Some scenes have also been shot at the Bar Zeffé, a bar located near the main set that keeps its real name within the show. Built for the series, the shooting set is said to be ready to be converted into a real office space overnight. Shooting is done without spotlights, only with the office fluorescent lights. The neighbourhood paper Saint-Laurent News provides the show with fake newspapers used in filming.

== Internet videos ==
Made for the internet, around a minute long original videos of the boss alone at his desk, giving foolish advice to camera, were released online weekly in the last quarter of 2006 on Bell's Sympatico.msn.com. The American version also released internet videos, in the middle of 2006. Those are the episodes thus far.

- "La ponctualité": David reminds the viewers "punctuality" is what people should learn first, right after they are born. (September 13, 2006)
- "Le diplôme": David Gervais says that he doesn't only think about "the diploma", he wants to know what you know how to do, and maybe he can arrange a little something, if you..., but, embarrassed about what he appears to say, adds it's not in that sense... not sexual. (September 13, 2006)
- "L'efficacité au travail": For "efficiency at work", David advises to wake up happy. Like the Pope. (September 15, 2006)
- "L'argent": According to the boss, "money" isn't everything, even if they say it runs the world, okay, fine. (September 15, 2006)
- "La ville": Gervais defends the suburbs of "the city", such as Saint-Laurent or Trois-Rivières (actually a city of its own, 150 km from Montreal). (September 29, 2006)
- "Voyage de pêche": The boss talks of his reward for hard work, a "fishing trip" with a good male friend, under the stars, with only the two of us, but gets into an involuntary misunderstanding implying the trips might have romantic aspects. (September 29, 2006)
- "L'ancienneté": The boss explains his vision of "seniority". (September 29, 2006)
- "L'équipe": Gervais talks about "the team". (September 29, 2006)
- "Extrait épisode 1": A clip from the first episode where David, the receptionist and the corporate head discuss of a possible future merger between the Saint-Laurent and Terrebonne branches. Rocky calls on the intercom. (October 4, 2006)
- "Extrait épisode 2": A clip from the second episode where Gervais reassures the office staff about merger rumours and introduces a new female co-worker. (October 4, 2006)

== Episodes ==
- Episode 1: Dégraissage (Degreasing) (aired October 9, 2006)
- Episode 2: Image de marque (Brand Image) (aired October 16, 2006)
- Episode 3: Questions/réponses (Questions and Answers) (aired October 23, 2006)
- Episode 4: Conscientisation (Awareness) (aired October 30, 2006)
- Episode 5: Secrétaire personnelle (Personal Secretary) (aired November 6, 2006)
- Episode 6: Quitte ou double (Double or Nothing) (aired November 13, 2006)
- Episode 7: Bienvenue, Terrebonne (Welcome, Terrebonne) (aired November 20, 2006)
- Episode 8: Sortie de secours (Emergency Exit) (aired November 27, 2006)
- Episode 9: Vibrations (Vibrators) (aired December 4, 2006)
- Episode 10: Les trois B (The Three B's) (aired December 11, 2006)
- Episode 11: C't'encore drôle! (That's Still Funny!) (aired December 18, 2006)
- Episode 12: Solde avant liquidation (Liquidation Sale) (aired December 25, 2006)
- Epilogue (After the Job) (aired January 15, 2007)

== Cast ==
These are the actors and characters. To see how these characters compare with other versions of the show, see The Office § Counterparts.

- Regional Manager: David Gervais (Antoine Vézina)
- Sales Representative: Louis Tremblay (Sébastien Huberdeau)
- Receptionist: Anne Viens (Sophie Cadieux)
- Assistant to the Regional Manager: Sam Bisaillon (Paul Ahmarani)
- Office Temp: Fred Caillé (Alphé Gagné)
- Travelling Sales Representative: Rocky Larocque (Yves Amyot)
- Warehouse Employee and Receptionist's Fiancé: Luc (Martin Tremblay)
- Corporate Head: Emmanuelle Sirois-Keaton (Nathalie Coupal)
- Senior Sales Representative's girlfriend: Julie Évelyne Rompré
- A girlfriend of the temp: Valérie (Noémie Yelle)
- A trade unionist: Raymond (Bernard Carez)

== Criticism ==
La Job is a series that disappointed viewers. Series producer Anne-Marie Losique was about to end the series on November 13, 2006, but she asked the team to instead end with an epilogue episode on January 15, 2007.

== See also ==
- List of Quebec television series
- List of Quebec television series imports and exports
- Television of Quebec
- Culture of Quebec
- The Office
- Le Bureau
