= Charles Lafortune =

Canadian actor, TV personality (born 1969)

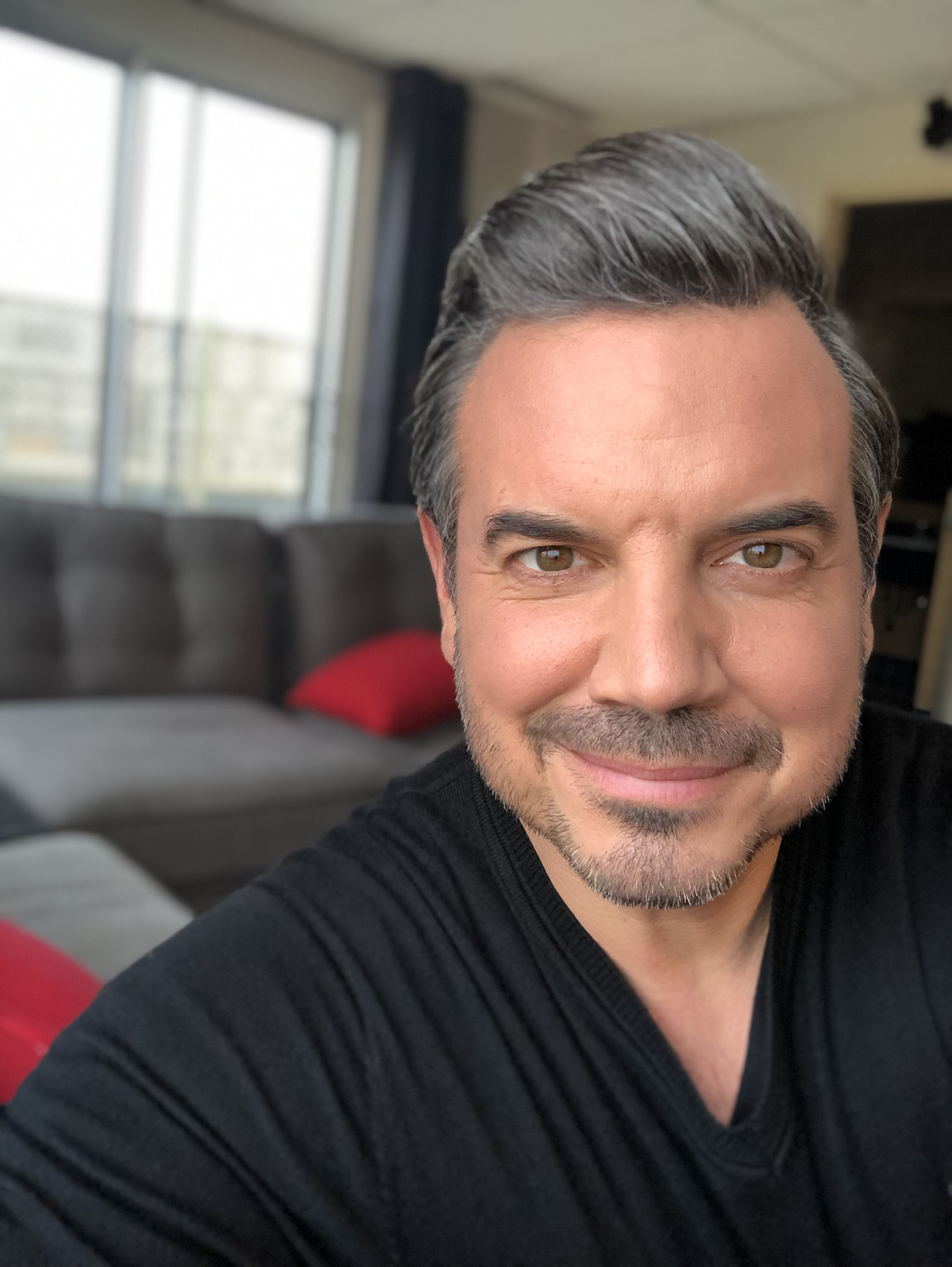
Charles Lafortune in 2015

Charles Lafortune (born July 25, 1969) is a Canadian actor and radio and television host.

Lafortune was born in Montreal, Quebec, and raised in Saint-Bruno-de-Montarville. He graduated from Conservatoire d'art dramatique de Montréal in 1993. He appeared in a number of Canadian television films and series in Quebec including Watatatow in 1990 with other notable series including Diva, Zone de Turbulence, Catherine, Rivière-des-Jérémie and Les Poupées russes.

He has played roles on stage in a number of theatrical productions that made him a vidange on Théâtre du Rideau Vert, le Théâtre Jean Duceppe, La Licorne and Théâtre St-Denis.

He also hosted a number of important Quebec television shows including Chasse à l'homme. But he was hugely famous for L'école des fans for five seasons from 2003 to 2008, in a format similar to one presented on French television by Jacques Martin, where young children interpret songs in presence of the original artist. In 2003, he also hosted the multiple awards winning TV game show Le Cercle on TVA, for six consecutive seasons from 2005 to 2011 and La classe de 5e, Quebec version of the TV game show Are You Smarter Than a 5th Grader?. Between 2005 and 2007, he hosted the charitable Téléthon Opération Enfants Soleil.

He was presenter of until June 2011 self-titled radio programme Lafortune vous sourit in 2011, closely followed by Les poids lourds de retour CKOI-FM radio station as a co-host with Patrick Marsolais and Mario Tremblay.

In 2013, he became host of the inaugural season of La Voix, the French Canadian version of The Voice. As of 2026, he has hosted all 11 seasons of the show.

In 2012, he co-founded the production house C Majuscule Média in partnership with Jacquelin Bouchard of Pixcom. The company launched the web series Marc Gendron et ses amis starring Phil Roy.

== Personal life ==
Lafortune is married to the comedian Sophie Prégent and father of a son Mathis born in December and who has developmental problems and autism. Lafortune and Prégent are spokesmen for "Pas de géants", a school specialising in education of autistic children.

== Radio and television ==
TV series

- 1993: Les grands procès (the episode "Fred Rose" as a police veteran)
- 1995: Les grands procès (the episode "L'affaire Côté" as the student Légaré)
- 1996: Bouledogue Bazar (the episode "Rébecca Johnson contre Jimmy Smash" as Jummy Smash)
- 1996: L'amour avec un grand A (the episode L'étrangleuse as Richard)
- 1998: Watatatow (the episode "Papa a raison #565" as Guy Lebeau)
- 1998-2001: Zone de Turbulence as Charles
- 1999: Diva (the episode "L'espoir au compte-gouttes" as Francis Kennedy)
- 1999: Catherine as Pierre Beaudet
- 2001: Rivière-des-Jérémie as Christophe Lange
- 2002: Les Poupées russes as Sylvain Dorais
- 2003: Les aventures tumultueuses de Jack Carter (the episode "Bons Baisers de Baldaquie: Part 2" as Pierre)
- 2006: Lance et compte: La revanche as Hugo Trottier

TV Programmes

- 2000: Tôt ou tard
- 2000-2001: Jet 7
- 2002: Chasse à l'homme
- 2003-2008: L'école des fans
- 2005-2011: Le Cercle (TV game show)
- 2008: La classe de 5e (TV game show)
- 2013–present: La Voix

Radio

- 2011: Lafortune vous sourit
- 2011-2012: Les poids lourds du retour

== Awards and nominations ==
Awards won

- 2006: Artis best presenter of a game show (for Le Cercle)
- 2007: Artis best presenter of a game show (for Le Cercle)
- 2007: Artis masculine personality of the year
- 2008: Artis best presenter of a game show (for Le Cercle)
- 2008: Artis masculine personality of the year
- 2011: Artis best presenter of a game show (for Le Cercle, La classe de 5e)
- 2011: Artis masculine personality of the year

Nominations

- 2001: Gémeaux for best presenter for youth for Zone de turbulence
- 2001: Gémeaux for best presenter for youth for Watatatow
- 2005: Gémeaux for best presenter of a variety show for L'école des fans
- 2006: Gémeaux for best presenter of a variety show for L'école des fans
- 2006: Artis for best host of cultural variety, entertainment magazines and talk shows for L'école des fans
- 2007: Artis for best male role in a Quebec television series for Les poupées russes
