= Simon Lacroix (actor) =

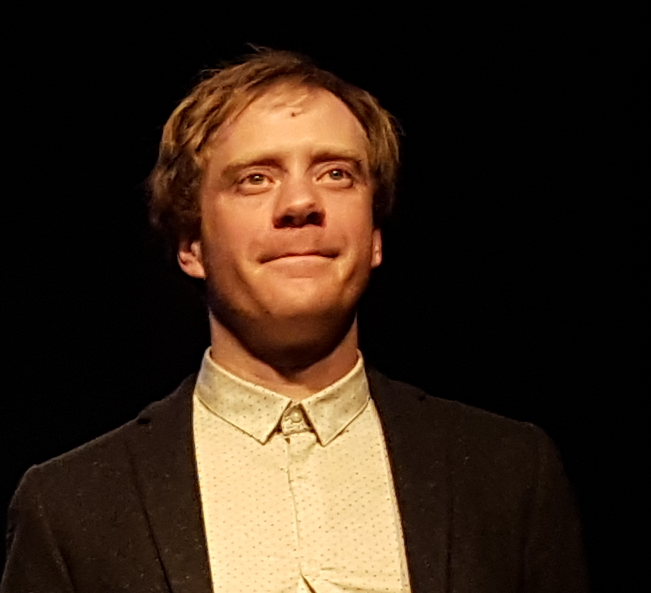
- Born: August 30, 1984 (age 42); Ottawa, Ontario
- Education: Conservatoire d'art dramatique de Montréal
- Occupations: Actor, playwright, screenwriter
- Years active: 1999-present

Simon Lacroix (born August 30, 1984) is a Canadian actor and writer based in Quebec. He is most noted as a three-time Gémeaux Award nominee for his role as Éric in the television comedy series Lâcher prise.

Born in Ottawa, Ontario, he is a 2011 graduate of the Conservatoire d'art dramatique de Montréal. He first became known for Projet bocal, a play he wrote and performed in with Raphaëlle Lalande et Sonia Cordeau in 2013.

He was a Gémeaux nominee for Best Supporting Actor in a Comedy Series in 2017, 2018 and 2019. In 2021, he was a nominee for Best Lead Actor in a Drama Series for his role as Albert Scott Ducharme in Faits divers.

== Filmography ==
=== Film ===
| Year | Title | Role | Notes |
|---|---|---|---|
| 2015 | La Grande Visite | | |
| 2018 | March Fool (Poisson de mars) | | |
| 2022 | Nut Jobs (Les pas d'allure) | Director of The Misanthrope | |
| 2023 | When Adam Changes (Adam change lentement) | Adam | Voice role |
| 2023 | Coco Farm (Coco ferme) | Éric | |

=== Television ===
| Year | Title | Role | Notes |
|---|---|---|---|
| 2014 | Agent Secret | Writer only | |
| 2015 | L'Étrange province | Carl | |
| 2015 | Sharp | Didier | |
| 2016 | Hypno | Luc Potvin | |
| 2016 | Deluxe Motion | Writer only | |
| 2017 | Julien Lacroix | | |
| 2017 | District 31 | Guy Poirier | |
| 2017-2020 | Lâcher prise | Éric | |
| 2018 | La Malédiction de Jonathan Plourde | Nic | |
| 2018-2020 | L'Académie | M. Paul | |
| 2018-2022 | Léo | Drouin | |
| 2021 | Sans rendez-vous | Patient | |
| 2021 | Faits divers | Albert Scott Ducharme | |
| 2022 | Larry | Jonathan | |
| 2023 | Mégantic | Fr. Rémi David | |

== Stage roles ==
- 2009: L'Envolée Symphonique
- 2010: Le Jumeau de Molière
- 2010: Appartement B
- 2010: Kroum
- 2010: OMFUG
- 2011: Le jardin de griottes (La Cerisaie)
- 2011: Pinocchio
- 2011: Poésie, sandwichs et autres soirs qui penchent
- 2013: Projet bocal
- 2014: Les Voisins
- 2018: Le déclin de l'empire américain
- 2020: Fairfly
