= Comme dans l'espace =

- Genre: Children's television series; Educational
- Created by: Marcel Gallant
- Written by: Christian Essiambre; Jean-Sébastien Lévesque; Marijo Meunier; Luckas Cardona Morisset; Micheline Sylvestre
- Composer: Asif Illyas
- Country of origin: Canada
- Original language: French
- No. of seasons: 1
- No. of episodes: 13

Production
- Executive producers: Marcel Gallant; Gilles Doiron; Chris Goguen; Marc Savoie
- Production locations: Halifax, Nova Scotia, Canada; Shediac, New Brunswick, Canada
- Running time: 30 minutes
- Production companies: Connections Productions; Botsford Média

Original release
- Network: Unis TV
- Release: March 2, 2021

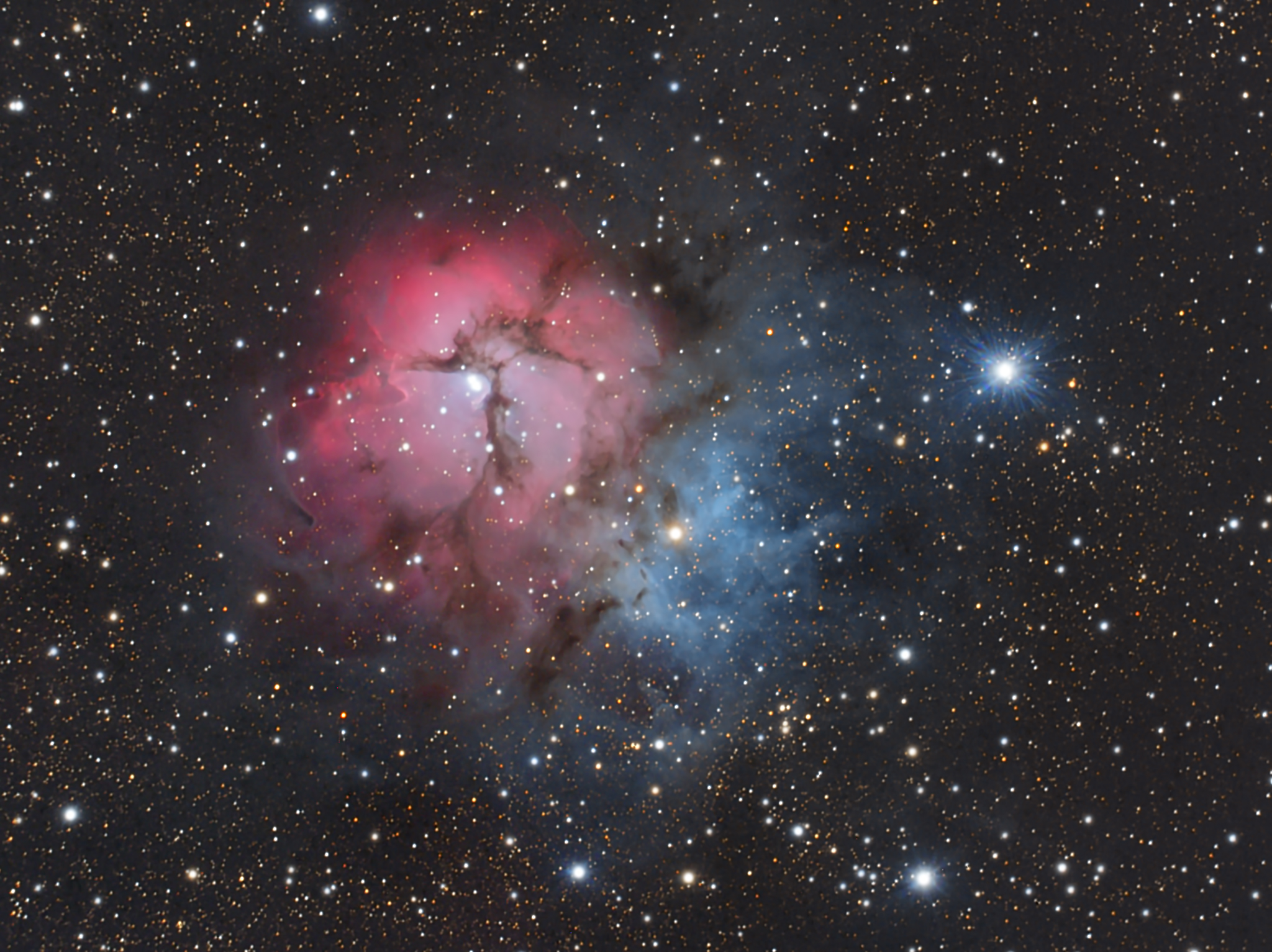
Celestial Beauty The Trifid Nebula

Comme dans l'espace (lit. 'Like in Space') is a Canadian French-language children's television program for youth aged 9–12. The series explores astronomy and the cosmos. In each episode, a new space-related concept is presented using experiments, expert information, and the resources of an android that uses artificial intelligence. The series is co-produced by Botsford Media and Connections Productions.

Season 1 of the series was first aired on the television channel Unis TV on 2 March 2021.

== Plot ==
Comme dans l’espace is fiction-based and tells the story of two adolescents, Alex and Joaquim. These two vloggers discover a former secret space agency station (the bunker). With the assistance of an android, Mia, an apprentice astronaut, data from the Canadian Space Agency and various experiments, they explore the phenomena of the science of space.

In each episode, Alex and Joaquim are assigned a new mission from Frédéric Gallant, an apprentice astronaut. Each mission explores a new space-related subject such as black holes, weightlessness and the movement of the planets. Their objective is to learn about the science of the cosmos all the while conducting experiments on Earth. They vlog these experiments and share their experiences with their viewing public.

The location of the bunker is unknown to the public and no-one other than Frédéric and Mia know they are using the bunker to do their vlog. They have several close-calls with the information support technician and a few false alarms to add to their challenge.

The concept of this television series, Comme dans l'espace, is to provide an educational experience for the young, but in effect, it is a show for all ages.

== Production ==
=== Cast ===
This table presents the principal actors in Season 1.

Actor	Character
Marianne Verville	Alex
Thomas Derasp-Verge	Joaquim
Tania Brideau	Mia
Karl Walcott	Frédéric Gallant - apprentice astronaut
André Roy	Tortue
Christian Essiambre	voice of Astro

=== Characters ===
- Alex

An adventurer passionate about exploring space. Curious and full of life, she is overflowing with energy and will stop at nothing. She wants to see everything and live each adventure to the fullest. Joaquim's best friend, she tries everything she can to get him to do things or experiment when he would never dare to do it on his own. She represents the story and experience of the exploration of space.

- Joaquim

With a lifelong passion about space, Joaquim is a quiet storm. When he finally decides to embark on an adventure, he goes all out and even surprises himself. He is curious, knowledgeable, and also wants to convey his passion for space, but he has a nervous temperament all the same, and he is often reluctant to embark on an adventure. He embodies the humor and the human side of the series.

- Mia

The android of the secret bunker of the Canadian Space Agency has access to all of the Agency's records, and she's always one question away from the answer. She is a one-dimensional character, who has no human references other than the ones she has in her database. She has no humour and takes things at face value, but she is always ready to give definitions, information or to correct certain information, at any time, even if it is not the time. An endless source of information, Mia can project images wherever she wants, and control the entire bunker.

- Frédéric Gallant

An aspiring young astronaut from the Canadian Space Agency, Frédéric patiently awaits the day he is sent on a mission to space. He is the key to the bunker and the bridge between it and the Agency. Seeing in Joaquim and Alex his own passion for space, Frédéric allows them to enter and exit the Agency bunker as they see fit, but in secret. Plus, through Mia and the bunker screens, he provides our vloggers with all the information they need to fuel their adventures.

- Tortue

A nickname given by Alex and Joaquim, Tortue, the IT support technician is a constant source of stress for our two vloggers. Part security guard, archivist, IT support technician, janitor and more, Tortue is never happy to come and inspect the bunker, but on the orders of the Agency, he does come more often than he would like. He does not know that our two young people are taking refuge there, and we always have the impression that he will surprise them. He is often about to discover Alex or Joaquim's presence, but he is not skillful enough to see them. Without knowing it, he provides material for the adventures of our two animators.

=== Guests ===
Season 1
Guest	Position	Episode	Episode name
Marie-Michèle Limoges	Science and Education Director at the Cosmodome in Montréál, Québec	1; 13	Weightlessness; The Sun
David Saint-Jacques	Astronaut with the Canadian Space Agency	1; 2; 8; 13	Weightlessness; Oxygen; Water; The Sun
Blood Brothers FX; Jean-Matthieu Bérubé; Carlo Harrietha	Special effects company based in Montreal, Quebec, Canada	2	Oxygen
Dr. Vincent Hénault-Brunet	Astronomer and Assistant Professeur in the Department of Astronomy and Physics at Saint Mary's University in Halifax, Nova Scotia	3	Planetary movement
Luc Richard	Surfer et genetic scientist	3	Planetary movement
Stéphane Bernier	Ecological homes expert	4	The space station
Sara Arsenault	Project manager Montreal Science Centre	4	The space station
Dr. John Calder	Senior geologist and Professor at the Department of Geology at Saint Mary's University à Halifax	5	Volcanoes
Myriam Latulippe	Astrophysicist; Rio Tinto Alcan Planetarium in Montreal	5; 11	Volcanoes; Black Holes
Yannick Bergeron	Chemistry teacher, chemist	5; 6; 12	Volcanoes; Stars; The Gaseous Planets
Jean-Michel Castonguay	Director of the Astronomical Observatory of Charlevoix, Quebec	6; 10	Stars; The Moon
Simon A. Bélanger	Scientific guide and creator of educational programmes Rio Tinto Alcan Planetarium in Montreal	6; 7; 10	Stars; The notion of time The Moon
Ismaël Boisvert	Head of programming at the Cosmodome in Montréal	7	The notion of time
Peter Gibbs	President at Survival Systems Training	8	Water
Kevin Snair	Guide at Hopewell Rocks Park	9	The Rocky Planets
Matt Stimson	Assistant curator of Geology and Paleontology at the New Brunswick Museum	9	The Rocky Planets
Frédérique Baron	Astrophysicist at the Cosmodome in Montréál, Québec	12	The Gaseous Planets
Gabriel Chouinard	Director Éclipse Solar Car at the École de technologie supérieure	13	The Sun
Veronique Bouvette	Member of the team - Éclipse Solar Car at the École de technologie supérieure	13	The Sun

Season 2

Guest	Position	Episode	Episode name

== Episodes ==
=== Season 1 (2021) ===
# of episode	Original airdate	Title
1	March 2, 2021	Weightlessness
2	March 9, 2021	Oxygen
3	March 16, 2021	Planetary Motion
4	March 23, 2021	International Space Station
5	March 30, 2021	Volcanoes
6	April 6, 2021	Stars
7	April 13, 2021	The Notion of Time
8	April 20, 2021	Water
9	April 27, 2021	The Rocky Planets
10	May 4, 2021	The Moon
11	May 11, 2021	Black Holes
12	May 18, 2021	The Gaseous Planets
13	May 25, 2021	The Sun

=== Season 2 (2023) ===
# of episode	Original airdate	Title

== Production crew ==
- Director : Christian Essiambre
- Writers : Christian Essiambre, Jean-Sébastien Lévesque, Marijo Meunier, Luckas Cardona Morisset, Micheline Sylvestre
- Director of Photography : Blake Stilwell
- Sound Engineer : Paul Goguen
- Lighting : Blake Stilwell
- Editors : Eric Leclerc, Robert Sharpe
- Producers : Marcel Gallant, Gilles Doiron, Chris Goguen, Marc Savoie
- Production Companies : Connections Productions, Botsford Media
- Broadcaster : Unis TV
- Country of origin : Canada
- Original language : French
- Format : colour
- Genre : Children's television series
- Length : 30 minutes (with commercials) about 24 minutes (without commercials)

== Filming ==
Filming for this series took place in Québec, New Brunswick and Nova Scotia, Canada.

A studio was built in Shediac, New Brunswick to simulate an old secret space station or bunker. A large part of the story of the production takes place in this 'bunker'.
