= La classe de 5e =

- Created by: Mark Burnett
- Starring: Charles Lafortune (host)
- Country of origin: Canada
- No. of seasons: 3

Production
- Production locations: Montreal, Quebec
- Running time: 60 minutes
- Production company: TVA Productions II Inc.

Original release
- Network: TVA
- Release: February 5, 2009 – April 25, 2011

La classe de 5e (French for Fifth Grade Class) is a Quebec television game show which premiered on February 5, 2009 on TVA. The show, an adaptation of the American game show Are You Smarter Than a 5th Grader?, is hosted by Québécois host and actor Charles Lafortune, who hosted L'école des fans and Le Cercle.

The grand prize in this version is CA$250,000. All winnings on this version are tax free.

The slogan used by the network is "Êtes-vous plus brillant qu'un élève de 5e?", the literal translation for "Are you smarter than a 5th grader?"

== Game's prizes ==
CA$250,000
CA$10,000	CA$125,000
CA$7,500	CA$100,000
CA$5,000	CA$75,000
CA$2,000	CA$50,000
CA$1,000	CA$25,000

The game is similar to La petite école, a weekly segment of the daily game show L'Union fait la force on Radio-Canada.

Originating from Montreal, La classe de 5e challenges Québécois contestants to prove that they are smarter than a fifth grader by answering a series of questions about a subject taught in a particular grade in a Quebec primary school, such as history, French, geography and mathematics. The set for the show is similar to the American version.

The class for the show is made up of five Montreal-area Grade 5 students chosen by the network for the show.

== Gameplay ==
Other than the money structure, the show's game play is the same as the American series.

If at any point during the game the player drops out or flunks out, they must face the camera, state their name, and declare "Je ne suis pas plus brillant(e) qu'un élève de 5e." ("I am not smarter than a 5th grader.") However, if the contestant wins the jackpot, they will have the opportunity to declare to the camera "Je suis plus brillant(e) qu'un élève de 5e !" ("I am smarter than a fifth grader!")
