= Cosmodome =

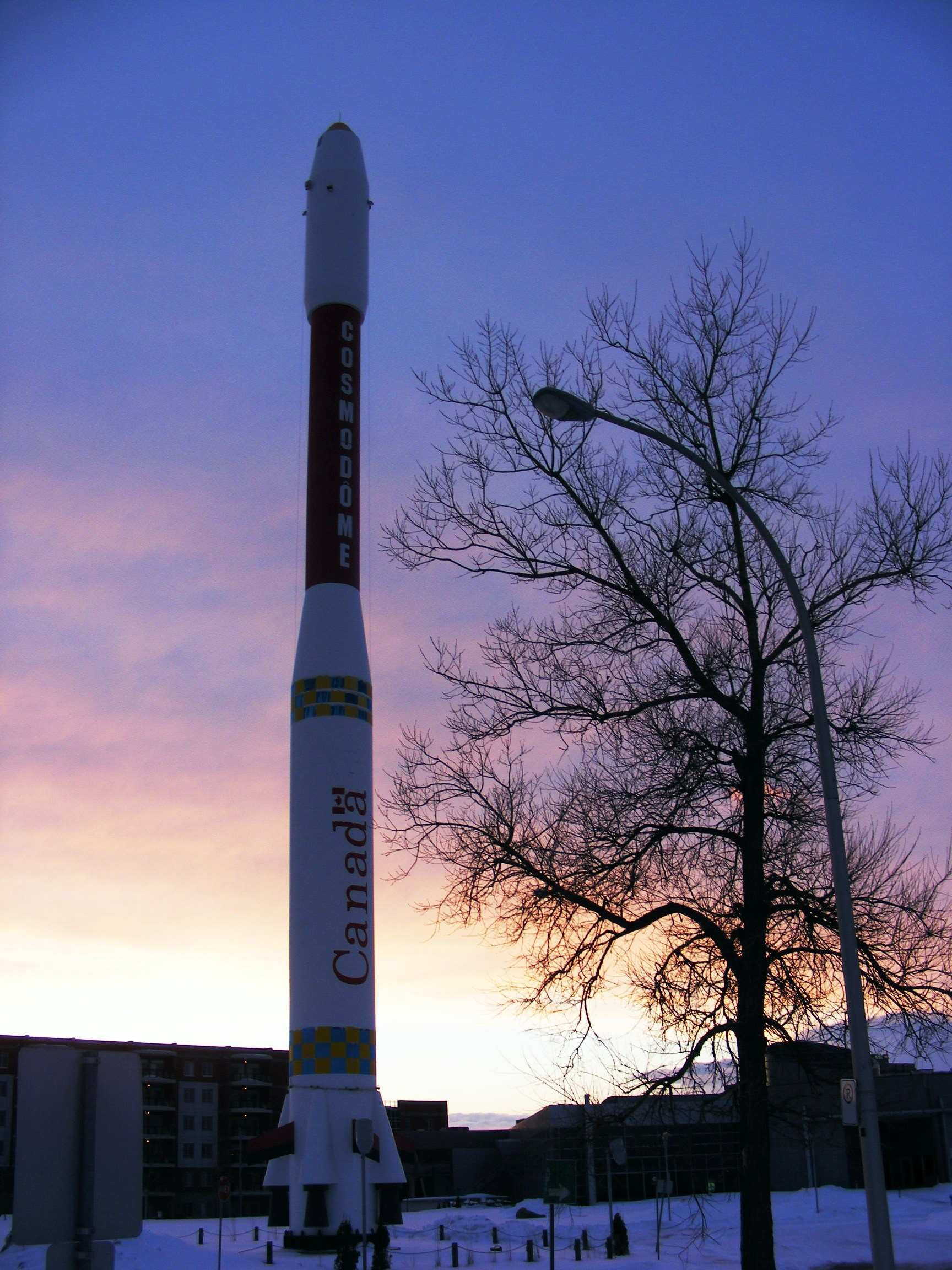
- A replica of an Ariane 4 rocket outside the Cosmodome

- Location of the Cosmodome in Laval
- Established: December 16, 1994
- Location: 2150 Autoroute des Laurentides, Laval, Quebec, Canada
- Coordinates: 45.5668°N 73.744°W
- Type: Space museum
- Public transit access: Montmorency
- Website: www.cosmodome.org

The Cosmodome (French: Cosmodôme) is a space science museum and education centre located in Laval, Quebec, Canada. Cosmodome is the home to both Space Camp Canada and the Space Science Centre (a museum). Space Camp Canada welcomed its first campers in July 1994 while the Space Science Centre opened its doors to the public in December 1994.

== History ==
The Cosmodome opened in 1994, but was facing bankruptcy by 1997. It was rescued in March 1997 by a $11.9-million government bailout.

== The Space Science Centre ==
The Space Science Centre is the only museum in Canada dedicated solely to the space sciences and houses one of two lunar rocks on display in Canada. The one featured was retrieved by astronaut James Irwin on the Apollo 15 mission.

== Space Camp Canada ==
Space Camp Canada features 6 space simulators, described below. Each is designed to help the space camp trainee understand the difficulties of working in space.

=== 1/6th Chair ===
The 1/6th chair simulates lunar gravity by suspending the user in a chair connected to a series of springs on a rail which allows for movement in an allotted area. A trainee's challenge on the 1/6 chair is to pick up objects from the ground while bouncing.

=== Zero G Wall ===
The Wall of Weightlessness, also known as the Zero G Wall, uses a counterbalance to suspend the trainee in mid air. By filling the counterbalance with water until its weight is approximately that of the trainee, the trainee is free to move in the 3 translational directions. Missions are usually given to trainees to heighten the experience and generally consist of interacting, in one way or another, with a mock-satellite suspended in proximity to the wall.

=== Space Station Mobility Trainer (SSMT) ===
The SSMT was a device conceived with exercise while on-orbit in mind. It consists of a circular jogging pad in which a special chair and harness has been fitted. Once seated, the trainee may run freely forwards and backwards, rotating along the axis of the pad.

=== Manned Maneuvering Unit ===
The Manned Maneuvering Unit simulates the NASA vehicle of the same name. By forcing compressed air out of rubber pads, the Space Camp MMU functions as a hovercraft, and is hence able to move with little resistance. A series of motors controlled via user input allow for horizontal translations and rotations, and a large gear and hydraulic pump allow for 360 degree roll and 30 degree pitch respectively.

=== Multi-Axis Chair ===
A trainee is strapped to the multi-axis chair which spins on three axes, disorientating its occupant. The trainee's challenge at the multi-axis chair is to read words, identify images, and do other tasks while rolling in three dimensions simultaneously.

== Affiliations ==
The Museum is affiliated with: CMA, CHIN, and Virtual Museum of Canada.
