= Antoine Vézina =

Canadian actor

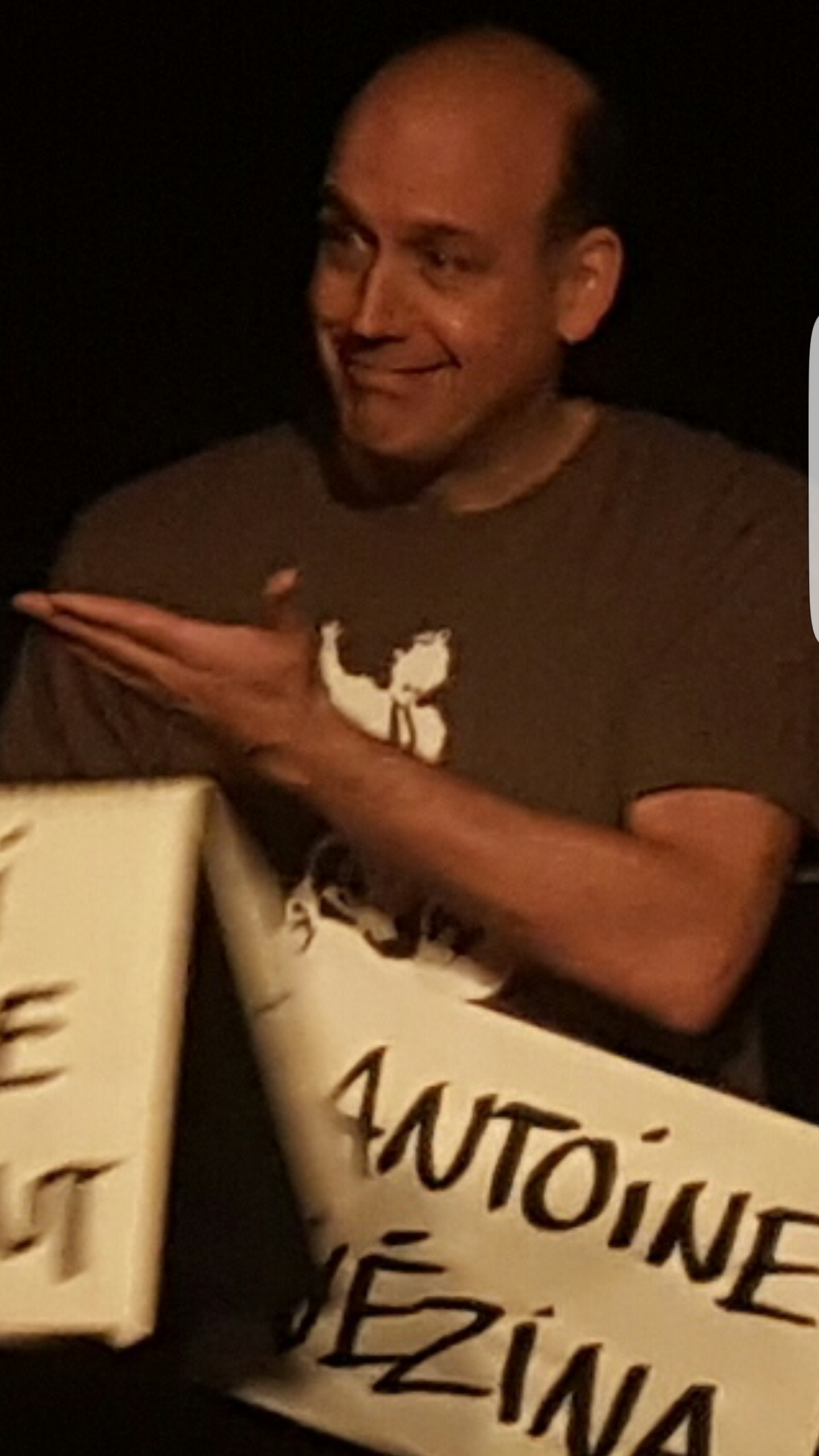
Antoine Vézina

Antoine Vézina is a Canadian actor and television personality.

== Career ==
A 2000 alumnus of the Université du Québec à Montréal with a bachelor's degree in theatre, Vézina has a strong improvisational theatre background, having performed in the Quebec improvisational leagues, the Ligue universitaire d'improvisation (LUI, league of Université Laval), the Ligue d'improvisation centrale de l'UQAM (LicUQAM, league of the Université du Québec à Montréal), the Cravates, the Ligue d'improvisation Globale, the Limonade, the Ligue d'improvisation montréalaise (LIM) and the reputed Ligue nationale d'improvisation (LNI). He is also a member of the improvisational troupe Cinplass.

Vézina was part of the winning team of the international improv competition the Mondial d'Impro in Strasbourg, France. In conventional theatre, he played in 2005 the role of Don Bazile in The Barber of Seville. He was cast for the lead character in the television show La Job, a Quebec adaptation of the British The Office. He was seen in a number of television advertising campaigns like those of the Fédération des producteurs de lait du Québec, Chrysler Jeep-Dodge and the Yellow Pages.

In 2025 he was announced as having a supporting role in the upcoming television series adaptation of Bon Cop, Bad Cop.

== Filmography ==
=== Films ===
- Les Boys IV - 2005
- Ce n'était qu'un rêve - 2004
- Aline - 2021

=== Television ===
- Annie et ses hommes - 2002
- Jean Duceppe - 2002
- Lance et Compte: La nouvelle génération - 2002
- Rumeurs - 2002
- L'Odyssée de l'espèce - 2003
- Caméra Café - 2004, guest star
- Les Ex - 2005
- Casting - 2005
- La Job - 2006
- Med - 2016
- Ceci n'est pas un talk-show - 2019
- Le maître du jeu - 2022
- Bon Cop, Bad Cop - 2026

== See also ==
- List of Quebec actors
- Ligue nationale d'improvisation
