= Hubert Gagnon =

Canadian actor (1947–2020)

- Hubert Gagnon prior his death
- Born: September 29, 1947
- Died: June 7, 2020 (aged 72); Longueuil, Quebec, Canada
- Occupation: Actor
- Years active: 1968–2017

Hubert Gagnon (September 29, 1947 – June 7, 2020) was a Canadian actor from Quebec. He was noted for being the voice-over of Homer Simpson and Grampa Simpson in the Canadian French-version of The Simpsons. He also acted in television and theatre.

== Career ==
Gagnon voiced Homer Simpson in the Quebec version of The Simpsons beginning in 1991. He continued in that role for 27 years until 2017, when he retired for health reasons. He was described as having a completely differently personality than Homer, with Gagnon remembered as "charming, polite and refined" by fellow voice actor Natalie Hamel-Roy. Nonetheless, his voice became so synonymous with the character that during a week-long visit to Cuba, he was constantly asked by children there to repeat Homer's catchphrase "D'oh!" He also did the voice-over for Grampa Simpson after the death of the previous voice-actor, Jean-Louis Millette. On the occasion of the series' 500th episode in 2012, Gagnon observed how voice acting was no longer disdained by the theatre industry, given that it was now being taught in stage schools. He added that he was able to make a decent living from that line of work.

Gagnon provided the voice of Mel Gibson, Robert De Niro, Richard Gere, and Christopher Walken, among others, in several English-language movies dubbed into French, as well as the character Picabo on the Québécois TV show Les Oraliens. He dubbed the character Vernon Dursley in the Harry Potter film series. He was also the voice of Optimus Prime in the Quebec dubbing of the original Transformers cartoon, but for the 2007 film, he was replaced by Guy Nadon, who had coincidentally portrayed Sideshow Bob alongside Gagnon in the Québécois dubbed version of The Simpsons. His ability to communicate an action solely through his voice was dubbed a "Gagnonerie".

Gagnon died on June 7, 2020, at his home in Longueuil, Quebec. He was 72, and had been suffering from cancer in the years leading up to his death.

== Filmography ==
- 1968–1970: Les Oraliens (TV series): Picabo (voice)
- 1970: Mont-Joye (TV series): Denis Meunier
- 1971: Nic et Pic (TV series)
- 1974: Les Beaux dimanches
- 1974–1975: La Petite Patrie (TV series): Laurent
- 1982: Monsieur le ministre
- 1984–1985: Transformers (The Transformers) (TV series): Optimus Primus (Optimus Prime) (québécoise voice)
- 1991–2017: Les Simpson (The Simpsons) (Animation): Homer Simpson (québécoise voice)
- 1994–2001: 4 et demi
- 2007: Les Simpson: Le Film (The Simpsons Movie) (Animated movie): Homer Simpson (québécois voice)
