= Viens voir les comédiens =

Viens voir les comédiens is a television show on the Canadian French-language arts and culture television network ARTV.

== Description ==
The show is directly based on the format used in similar television programs: the American Inside the Actors Studio and the French Les feux de la rampe, in that each episode features a cinema or theatre actor answering questions from the host, René Homier-Roy, and, at the end of the show, from members of the audience.

== Title ==
The show's title is taken from a Charles Aznavour song and means "Come see the actors".

== See also ==
- List of Quebec television series
- Television of Quebec
- Cinema of Quebec
- Culture of Quebec
