= Marc Favreau =

Canadian actor and poet

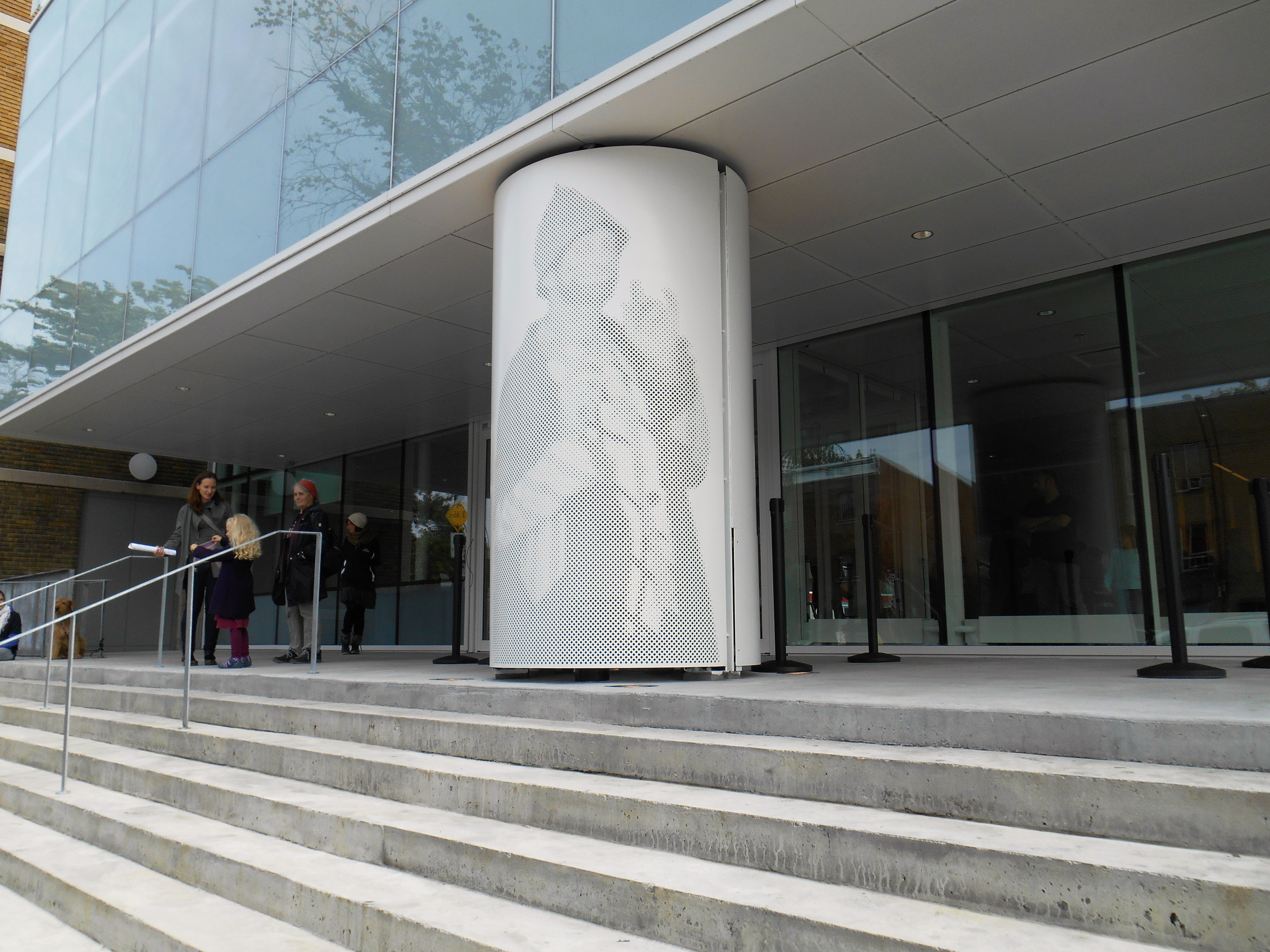
Bibliothèque Marc-Favreau, 500, boulevard Rosemont, Montréal, a stone's throw from the Rosemont metro station.

Marc Favreau, OC CQ (November 9, 1929 – December 17, 2005) was a French Canadian humorist, film actor, and poet born in Montreal, Quebec. He is best known for developing and portraying the clown character Sol.

Favreau began his television career as a regular on La Boîte à surprise, a long-running children's television show on Radio-Canada. At that time, he was teamed with another clown in an act called Bim et Sol. Favreau developed Sol's monologues into an enormously popular one-man show. Favreau then teamed up with another clown for Sol et Bouton. Finally, Favreau created, with Luc Durand a popular television series called Sol et Gobelet.

Later, he played numerous roles on stage and on several television series on Canadian television, such as Parlez-moi, an instructional program on the French language on TVOntario in the late 1970s. Many English Canadian children got their first exposure to Quebec French through Favreau's work. He is best remembered for the witty deconstructions of the French language which he invented for Sol.

In 1995, he was appointed Knight of the National Order of Quebec and an Officer of the Order of Canada in 2003. He was also a member of the Order of the Francophones of America, and was married to Quebec comedian-actress Micheline Gérin who died in 2007 at age 76.

Favreau died of cancer at Hôpital Notre-Dame in Montreal at 76 years old. A library bearing his name was built on the site of the former municipal workshops at 500 Boulevard Rosemont in Montreal in 2012. A school in the Notre-Dame-de-Grâce district also bears his name in homage.

== See also ==
- Culture of Quebec
- Television of Quebec
- Cinema of Quebec
