= René Simard =

Canadian pop singer (born 1961)

René Simard CM CQ
- Born: René Claude Simard; 28 February 1961 (age 65); Chicoutimi, Saguenay, Quebec, Canada
- Genre: Pop
- Occupations: Singer; actor
- Years active: 1970s–present
- Spouse: Marie-Josée Taillefer (m. 1987)
- Relatives: Nathalie Simard (sister)

René Claude Simard CM CQ (born 28 February 1961) is a Canadian pop singer from Quebec. He is the older brother of Nathalie Simard.

== Biography ==
Simard was born in Chicoutimi, Quebec.

In 1974, Simard was awarded the Grand Prix by Frank Sinatra at the annual Tokyo Music Festival. In Canada, he hosted the CBC Television series The René Simard Show from 1977 to 1979.

Simard is also an occasional actor. He appeared alongside his brother Régis in the 1973 film Enuff Is Enuff (J'ai mon voyage!) and played the henchman Stu in the 1995 film Kids of the Round Table.

Between 2006 and 2008, he hosted the television series L'heure de gloire on Ici Radio-Canada Télé.

Simard was formerly managed by Guy Cloutier who also managed his sister, Nathalie. In 2004, Cloutier was convicted of sexually assaulting Nathalie when she was a child. Michel Vastel's 2005 book on the case, Briser le silence (Breaking the Silence), alleged that René co-operated with Cloutier in trying to hide the assaults. In 2005, Simard made a public statement in which he denied this.

In 1999, he briefly played the role of the Phantom in the Toronto production of The Phantom of the Opera (April – May 23, 1999). He was succeeded by Paul Stanley.

Simard has been married to TV hostess Marie-Josée Taillefer since 1987.

In 2014, Simard was named a Member of the Order of Canada "For his contributions to the development of Quebec culture as a performer, host and director."
