= L'École des fans (Canadian TV series) =

L'École des fans (French for School of Fans) is a Canadian musical television program that aired on TVA in Quebec from 2004 to 2008. It was hosted by Charles Lafortune, who also hosted Le Cercle and La classe de 5e, both of which aired on TVA. The program is produced in Montreal, Quebec.

Adapted from the French version, L'École des fans featured singers, children 4 to 6 years old, from Quebec. During the program, each child sings a song from a guest star, who accompanies the child in singing.

Musical guests that appeared on L'École des fans included Céline Dion, Garou, Martin Deschamps, Wilfred Le Bouthillier, Michel Louvain, Marjo, Lara Fabian, Kaïn, Mitsou, and Boule Noire.

== Notable contestants ==
Francis Bernier, born on September 5, 1997, participated four times to the show, among which two to sing with Céline Dion, another time with Mitsou and another one with Patrick Norman. Since, he started a professional music career and he also released a music album titled Prince d'Azur. He is also a part of the kids who sang on the music album Les fans chantent Noël.
