= Point de mire =

Canadian television show

Point de mire was a popular Quebec information show on Radio-Canada that aired from 1956 to 1959. The television show is famous for being hosted by a future cabinet minister and Premier of Quebec, René Lévesque.

A trademark of the show was the pedagogy of Lévesque, explaining with a chalkboard and clarifying world events to his viewers. This same technique developed at Point de mire he would later use often on television, or in person, to explain political plans and convictions, ranging from the nationalization of electricity during the Quiet Revolution to Quebec independence.

== See also ==
- List of Quebec television series
- Television of Quebec
- Culture of Quebec
