= Les Oraliens =

Les Oraliens is a French language children's television show made in Québec from 1969 to 1972; it was the first television program produced by the newly formed Radio-Québec, known today as Télé-Québec. Its stories revolved around aliens Calinelle (played by Lisette Anfousse) and Picabo (played by Hubert Gagnon), who both wore matching orange suits which included a mask and a mushroom-shaped headdress. The pair befriended the human Francolin upon arrival on earth. Other characters included the talking bird Couac (a puppet voiced by Gaétane Laniel) and the mechanical dog Millimagino.

The show's foremost purpose was language acquisition, which was conveyed by the way the aliens used their superpowers: in order to magically accomplish difficult or impossible tasks, they would state a sentence to be repeated and then silently mouthed it while children at home were supposed to say it. Les Oraliens, unlike a contemporary children's program with a similar premise, Les 100 tours de Centour, was more about proper pronunciation than sentence construction.

The show's purpose was also conveyed by the recurring bad guy, le Furotte (played by André Cartier), who always mumbled incoherently. There have been a few commentators over the years who have perceived in his speech pattern a parody of rural and working-class Quebec French, and have criticized the show as an effort to stigmatize some aspects of Québec French.
