= Télé Achats =

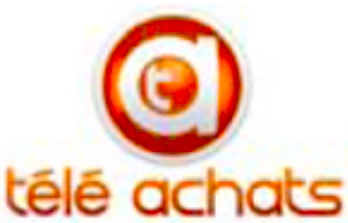
- Country: Canada
- Broadcast area: National
- Headquarters: Montreal, Quebec

Programming
- Picture format: 480i (SDTV)

Ownership
- Owner: Vidéotron (1995–1998); Groupe TVA (1998–2012)

History
- Launched: November 1, 1995
- Closed: August 1, 2012
- Former names: Canal Infopub (1995–1999); Club TVAchats (1999–2000); Canal TVAchats (2000–2003); STV Shopping TV (2003–2005); Shopping TVA (2005–2008)

Télé Achats, previously known as Shopping TVA, was a Canadian French language cable television shopping channel specialized in infomercials. Télé Achats was owned and operated by Groupe TVA, a division of Quebecor Media, and offered exclusively in Quebec by the cable company Vidéotron.

Télé Achats broadcast infomercials shot in French, or shot originally in English and dubbed into French.

As a shopping television service, Télé Achats was exempted from Canadian Radio-television and Telecommunications Commission (CRTC) licensing.

== History ==
On November 1, 1995, Vidéotron launched Canal Infopub, a specialty TV channel specialized in infomercials, that broadcast only infomercials shot in French, or shot originally in English and dubbed into French.

From August 1996, Canal Infopub broadcast infomercials day and night.

On November 1, 1998, Groupe TVA acquired Canal Infopub from Vidéotron.

On May 1, 1999, Canal Infopub was rebranded Club TVAchats, a specialty TV channel dedicated to infomercials and home shopping. At the same time, Club TVAchats added a TV program of home shopping to the programming named Club TVAchats.

In 2000, Club TVAchats was rebranded Canal TVAchats.

STV Shopping TV logo from 2003 to 2005

In 2003, extending his TV program Boutique TVA, Canal TVAchats was rebranded STV Shopping TV, dedicating largely to the broadcasting of TV programs of home shopping.

Shopping TVA logo from 2005 to 2008

In 2005, STV Shopping TV was rebranded Shopping TVA.

In 2008, Shopping TVA was rebranded Télé Achats. Thereafter, the TV channel broadcast mostly infomercials, and the TV program of home shopping Shopping TVA was on air mainly to the TVA network.

The Télé Achats channel ceased operations on August 1, 2012 at midnight. A white message on a black background appeared, quoting this : «The Télé Achats channel has ceased its activities. To continue to benefit from a multitude of products, we invite you to watch the program Shopping TVA at the TVA network, or visit shoppingtva.ca. The Télé Achats management takes the opportunity to sincerely thank its faithful televiewers.», preceded by a French version of the same message.

== See also ==
- Shopping TVA (TV program)
