= La Vie qui bat =

- Genre: Nature documentary
- Country of origin: Canada
- Original language: French
- No. of seasons: 1

Production
- Producer: Guy Provost
- Running time: 30 minutes

Original release
- Network: Radio-Canada
- Release: 1955 – 1965

La vie qui bat is a Canadian nature documentary television series that aired on Télévision de Radio-Canada from 1955 to 1965, and was seen on the English CBC Television service in 1968.

== Premise ==
This Montreal-produced series featured a combination of documentaries concerning animals and nature.

== Scheduling ==
This half-hour series was broadcast from 1955 to 1965 on Radio-Canada. The series was rebroadcast on CBC Television's English network Tuesdays at 5:30 p.m. from 23 July to 27 September 1968.
