= Volt (TV series) =

Volt is a French language news magazine television series for teenagers. It airs on TFO, the French language public broadcaster in Ontario, as well as on Radio-Canada's video on demand website TOU.TV. The show debuted in 1994. The television series ended in December 2010, after 16 years on air.

== Hosts ==
Hosts for the 2007–2008 season of Volt were:

- Nadia Campbell
- David Baeta
- Fabienne L'Abbé
- Christian Martel
- Yamil Coulombe
