= Parlez-moi =

- Genre: Children’s educational series
- Written by: Denise Boiteau; David Stansfield
- Directed by: Peter McLean
- Country of origin: Canada
- Original language: French
- No. of seasons: 2
- No. of episodes: 90

Production
- Executive producer: Maggie Stratton
- Producers: Denise Boiteau; David Stansfield
- Running time: 10-15 mins.

Original release
- Release: 1978 – 1980

Parlez-moi (French for "Talk to Me") is an educational television series which was produced in Toronto by TVOntario and broadcast from 1978 to 1980, with repeat broadcasts for several years afterwards. The host was Quebecois comedian Marc Favreau, who also appeared in this series under the guise of his trademark character, Sol the Clown.

== Format ==
Each episode would begin with Favreau appearing as himself, speaking in English, and introducing several Quebec French words and phrases. This was followed by a fragment of a comedy sketch involving Sol, in which all of the dialogue was in French, using the terms introduced by Favreau. After the sketch, the terms would appear by themselves on the screen, while Favreau's voice could be heard reciting them. The next portion of the sketch would then be presented in the same manner (typically three in total), and the episode would conclude by showing the entire Sol sketch, uninterrupted. Each episode used the same audio clip of Favreau announcing, "and now, here is the complete sketch again."

The opening sequence of Parlez-moi uses an outtake of the sketch from Episode 2, combined with new footage in order to show Sol speaking to Favreau, the actor who plays him, on the phone.

== Episode list ==
90 episodes were produced over two seasons.

=== Season 1 (1978) ===
Episodes in season 1 ran 10 minutes each.

1. "Sol in the Restaurant"
2. "Sol on the Telephone"
3. "Sol and the Burglar"
4. "Sol the Baby-sitter"
5. "Sol Goes Through Customs"
6. "Sol and the Fortuneteller"
7. "Sol's Weather Report"
8. "Sol's Physical Training"
9. "Sol at the Doctor's"
10. "Sol and the Washing Machine"
11. "Sol and the Garage Mechanic"
12. "Sol and the Policeman"
13. "Sol and the Cinema Ticket"
14. "Sol and the Scout Tent"
15. "Sol and the Christmas Tree"
16. "Sol and the Flea Market"
17. "Sol and the Photographer"
18. "Sol and the Fisherman"
19. "Sol and the Gambler"
20. "Sol and the Tomatoes"
21. "Sol at the Hotel"
22. "Sol at the Airport"
23. "Sol at the Hairdresser's"
24. "Sol's Job Interview"
25. "Sol Goes to the Beach"
26. "Sol's Birthday Cake"
27. "Sol the Painter"
28. "Sol at the Grocer's"
29. "Sol at the Hardware Store"
30. "Sol and the Clockmaker"
31. "Sol and the Mailman"
32. "Sol Goes to the Dentist"
33. "Sol Joins the Army"
34. "Sol's Singing Lesson"
35. "Sol Goes to the Bank"
36. "Sol at the Candy Store"
37. "Sol at the Shoe Store"
38. "Sol in the Library"
39. "Sol Plays Golf"
40. "Sol and the Game Show"
41. "Sol at the Drugstore"
42. "Sol and the Vacuum Cleaner"
43. "Sol at the Travel Agency"
44. "Sol and the Pizza"
45. "Sol and the Sailboat"
46. "Sol at the Record Store"
47. "Sol Buys a House"
48. "Sol at the Tailor's"
49. "Sol the Dishwasher"
50. "Sol Goes to Jail"
51. "Sol and the Lumberjack"
52. "Sol in the Haunted House"
53. "Sol Minds the Fruit Store"
54. "Sol in the Jewellery Store"
55. "Sol's Dancing Lesson"
56. "Sol in the Garden"
57. "Sol and the TV Commercial"
58. "Sol Goes to Court"
59. "Sol and the Artist"
60. "Sol in the Hospital"

=== Season 2 (1979) ===
Episodes in season 2 ran 15 minutes each, which was the standard length of instructional programming in North America.

1. "Sol and the Optician"
2. "Sol Goes West"
3. "Sol in the Elevator"
4. "Sol and the Assembly Line"
5. "Sol on the Bus"
6. "Sol Sets the Table"
7. "Sol on the Stage"
8. "Sol in the Post Office"
9. "Sol at the Train Station"
10. "Sol Rents a Room"
11. "Sol Plays Hockey"
12. "Sol and the Used Car"
13. "Sol and the Disc Jockey"
14. "Sol the Office Boy"
15. "Sol and the Great Detective"
16. "Sol Learns Good Manners"
17. "Sol and the Lovers"
18. "Sol at the Butcher's"
19. "Sol at the Fashion Boutique"
20. "Sol and the Pirates"
21. "Sol in the Sports Shop"
22. "Sol's First Aid Lesson"
23. "Sol and the Carpenter"
24. "Sol and the Spies"
25. "Sol at the Baker's"
26. "Sol in the Park"
27. "Sol Rides a Horse"
28. "Sol in the Laundry"
29. "Sol and the Balloon Race"
30. "Sol and the Journalist"
