= Les Aventures de Virulysse =

Canadian children's television series

Les Aventures de Virulysse (Eng: The Adventures of Christopher Microbius) was a French language children's show made in Quebec in the early 1980s. It used puppets and the stories centered on a scientist, his daughter and an anthropomorphic virus.
