= Space Station Mobility Trainer =

The Space Station Mobility Trainer (SSMT) is a training simulator used to train astronauts who will be staying in space stations. Astronauts in a space station orbiting a planet experience weightlessness, and therefore, have no physical sensation of up and down. They do however need to know where objects should be placed and how they should be oriented while building and maintaining the space station. The Space Station Mobility Trainer rotates the trainee on a single axis in a small loop. Grip tape as used on skateboards or stairwells is placed strategically throughout the loop to prevent slipping. The trainee is strapped into a chair mounted on a rotating axis (vertical) The astronauts "run" in this continuous loop and are flipped over repeatedly. Then the trainee stops suddenly, and must figure out where everything is. Trainees on this particular simulator usually will become disoriented.
