= Montreal Pop Concerts =

Televised music miniseries

- Genre: Symphony music
- Starring: Montreal Symphony Orchestra
- Country of origin: Canada
- Original language: English
- No. of seasons: 1
- No. of episodes: 8

Production
- Producers: Jean-Yves Landry; Pierre Morin
- Running time: 60 minutes

Original release
- Network: CBC Television; Radio-Canada
- Release: 12 July – 23 August 1969

Montreal Pop Concerts is a Canadian symphony music television miniseries produced and broadcast by Radio-Canada in 1969. It was also broadcast to English audiences on CBC Television.

== Premise ==
Performances of the Montreal Symphony Orchestra were recorded at Montreal's Place des Arts for this series.

== Scheduling ==
This hour-long series aired on CBC Television (English network) Saturdays at 1:00 p.m. from 12 July to 23 August 1969. The Radio-Canada (French network) airdates preceded the English broadcasts.

== Episodes ==
1. Operatic pieces sung by Clarice Carson, Richard Varreau and Robert Savoie. Alexander Brott was guest conductor. (Jean-Yves Landry producer)
2. The first part consisted of classical selections sung by Claude Léveillée while Brian Priestman conducted. The second part featured jazz selections with Neil Chotem as conductor. (Jean-Yves Landry producer)
3. Selections were sung by Claire Gagnier and Yoland Guerard with Jean Deslauriers as conductor. (Jean-Yves Landry producer)
4. Singer Ginette Reno was joined by conductors Boris Brott and Leon Bernier (Jean-Yves Landry producer)
5. The Montreal Symphony Orchestra's Franz-Paul Decker conducted on this episode featuring the Yvan Landry Jazz Group (Pierre Morin producer)
6. Vocalists Colette Boky, Perry Price, and Claude Corbeil were featured with conductor Franz-Paul Decker (Pierre Morin producer)
7. Vocalists Louise Lebrun, Huguette Tourangeau, Andre Turp, and Claude Corbeil were featured with conductor Pierre Hetu (Pierre Morin producer)
8. Gilles Vigneault was featured with conducting by Alexander Brott and Neil Chotem (Pierre Morin producer)
