= L'heure de gloire =

Quebecois singing competition television series

L'heure de gloire is a Quebecois French-language singing competition television series . The series premise is close to Simon Cowell's Duets: three actors/artists/politicians appear in each episode, singing a song, with the help of professional singers.

The program was hosted by René Simard. The series also highlight a newcomer to the Québec music scene, who one of the coaching professional singers have chosen. The show was broadcast by Radio-Canada from fall 2006 to spring 2008.
