= Iniminimagimo =

French language children's show

Iniminimagimo was a French language children's television show made in Quebec. It played in the late 1980s. Each episode featured a classic fairy tale played by the same cast.

Script writers for the series included Linda Wilscam, Marie-Francine Hébert, Maryse Pelletier and Claude Roussin. The show itself is made of 40 episodes:

1. Aladdin & the Magic Lamp
2. Alibaba & the Forty Thieves
3. Little Baja the Gypsy
4. Bluebeard
5. Snow White & the Seven Dwarfs
6. Goldilocks & the Three Bears
7. Bouki the little hyena
8. Cinderella
9. The Fisherman & the Golden Fish
10. Hansel & Gretel
11. There Was a Dog
12. Jack & the Beanstalk
13. Josée & the Green Mermaid
14. Katia & the Devil
15. The Spirit in the Bottle
16. The Tale of Aoyagi
17. The Sleeping Beauty
18. Beauty & the Beast
19. The Little Matchgirl
20. The Table, the Ass and the Stick
21. The Princess & the Pea
22. The Frog Prince
23. King Thrushbeard
24. Puss-in-Boots
25. The Devil with Three Golden Hairs
26. The Selfish Giant
27. The Pied Piper of Hamelin
28. The Tortoise & the Hare
29. Little-Red-Riding-Hood
30. The Nightingale
31. The Forty Dragons
32. The Emperor's New Clothes
33. The King's Rabbits
34. The Three Little Pigs
35. The Three Feathers
36. Donkey-skin
37. Little Sun & Little Goldenstar
38. Pinocchio
39. Riquet of the Tuft
40. Vassilissa the Beautiful
