= Catherine (1999 TV series) =

Canadian television series

Catherine was a Quebec sitcom that aired on Radio-Canada from 1999 to 2003. It tells the story of Catherine (Sylvie Moreau), a sexy, epicurean, man-crazy Montrealer in her thirties working at the advertising agency Mirage-Image, as well as the story of her best friend and orderly flatmate Sophie (Marie-Hélène Thibault), her landlord Rachel (Dominique Michel), her ex-boyfriend Pierre (Charles Lafortune) and other friends and co-workers.

== See also ==
- Television of Quebec
- List of Quebec television series
