= Kif-Kif (TV series) =

Quebec teen-oriented soap opera

- Genre: Comedy drama
- Created by: Sylvie Tremblay
- Written by: Luc Déry; Yves Lapierre; Marie-Frédérique Laberge-Milot; Rachel Cardillo
- Directed by: Simon Barrette (main director); Stéphan Joly; Michel Berthiaume
- Creative director: Stéphanie Bujold
- Starring: Roxane Bourdages; Jean-Robert Quirion; Marie-Lyse Laberge-Forest; Emmanuel Schwartz; Pierre-Luc Bouvrette; Amélie B. Simard; Émilie Gilbert; Iannicko N'Doua-Légaré
- Country of origin: Canada
- Original language: French
- No. of seasons: 2
- No. of episodes: 189

Production
- Executive producer: Jean-Pierre Morin
- Producer: Sylvie Tremblay
- Running time: 24–25 minutes
- Production company: Vivaclic

Original release
- Network: Radio-Canada
- Release: September 11, 2006 – September 2, 2008

Kif-Kif (known as Roommates in English) is a Quebec teen-oriented téléroman produced by Vivaclic and broadcast by Radio-Canada.

== Plot ==
The series center on a group of high school students—four girls and four boys—who live together at a Des Sables High School's residence.

== Cast ==
- Roxane Bourdages as Noémie
- Jean-Robert Quirion as Jean-Robert Nault
- Marie-Lyse Laberge-Forest as Fanny
- Emmanuel Schwartz as Julien
- Pierre-Luc Bouvrette as Félix
- Amélie B. Simard as Carole-Anne
- Émilie Gilbert as Allison
- Iannicko N'Doua-Légaré as Malik Tamba

== Production and broadcast ==
Kif-Kif was produced by Vivaclic and was originally broadcast at Radio-Canada from September 11, 2006 on the 17h timeslot replacing Watatatow. The company Tribal Nova developed an interactive website to be updated in real time as the series is broadcast. The series was conceived with the working title Comme en Appart and selected by the Quebecor Fund in Spring 2005. Episodes 105 to 189 were funded by the Canadian Television Fund with around $1.5 million.

On April 18, 2007, Radio-Canada announced that Kif-Kif was cancelled and would stop to air in Winter 2007. All 189 episodes were already shot by its cancellation time but only 104 had been broadcast by the network. Among the reasons given by the channel were the poor ratings and a decrease in Canadian Television Fund to support youth-oriented shows. Also, the show was failing to reach its target audience of 12–18 years and was mostly seen by adults.

The series rights were later sold to Latin America; in Brazil, it was broadcast by Boomerang and TV Brasil.

== Reception ==
Kif-Kif's website was elected the best website at the Boomerang Awards and the Gémeaux Awards. At the 2007 Gémeaux Awards it received six nominations and its episode 64 won the Best Screenplay in a Youth Program or Series. In 2008, it was nominated for Best Youth Program or Series – Fiction at the Gémeaux Awards but lost to Ramdam. It also received a French Award of Excellence from the Youth Media Alliance for the episode "Bye Julien".

In 2007, the series was exhibited in the same timeslot of Grand-Papa and recorded an average of 127,000 viewers against 118,000 of its competitor.

The Gazette's writer Gaëtan Charlebois praised the show's "solid acting" as well as its "jaunty" dialogues. However, he commented on the series's "bizarre aesthetic", saying: "Though Kif-Kif has the same shoestring budget as other such programs, it seems to show it more vigorously – almost revelling in its cheesy ugliness." Steve Proulx of Voir criticized what he called "a trivialization of smoking", questioning its occurrence in a show broadcast by a public station. Proulx also stated there was some publicity for Neutrogena and Canadian Armed Forces and he criticized it too.

== See also ==
- List of programs broadcast by Ici Radio-Canada Télé
- List of French-language Canadian television series
