= Sharlene Royer =

Canadian actress and stunt performer

- Born: Saint-Hyacinthe, Quebec
- Occupations: Actress, Stunt performer
- Years active: 1995–present

Sharlene Royer is a Canadian actress and stunt performer.

== Early life ==
Royer was born in Saint-Hyacinthe, Quebec, Canada.
