= Ballades et chansons =

Canadian music variety television series

- Genre: music variety
- Presented by: Jacques Fauteux
- Original languages: English; French
- No. of seasons: 1

Production
- Producer: Lisette LeRoyer
- Running time: 30 minutes

Original release
- Network: CBC Television; Radio-Canada
- Release: 6 July – 28 September 1969

Ballads and Songs is a Canadian music variety television series that aired on CBC Television in 1969.

== Premise ==
This series was produced in English and French by CBC's French network, Radio-Canada, for the English network. Episodes were recorded in various locations throughout all Canadian provinces. The series includes a range of musical artists of various genres from individuals to choirs. Songs of both Canadian languages are featured.

== Scheduling ==
The half-hour series aired on Sundays at 5:30 p.m. (Eastern) from 6 July to 28 September 1969.
