= Sylvie Moreau =

Canadian actress

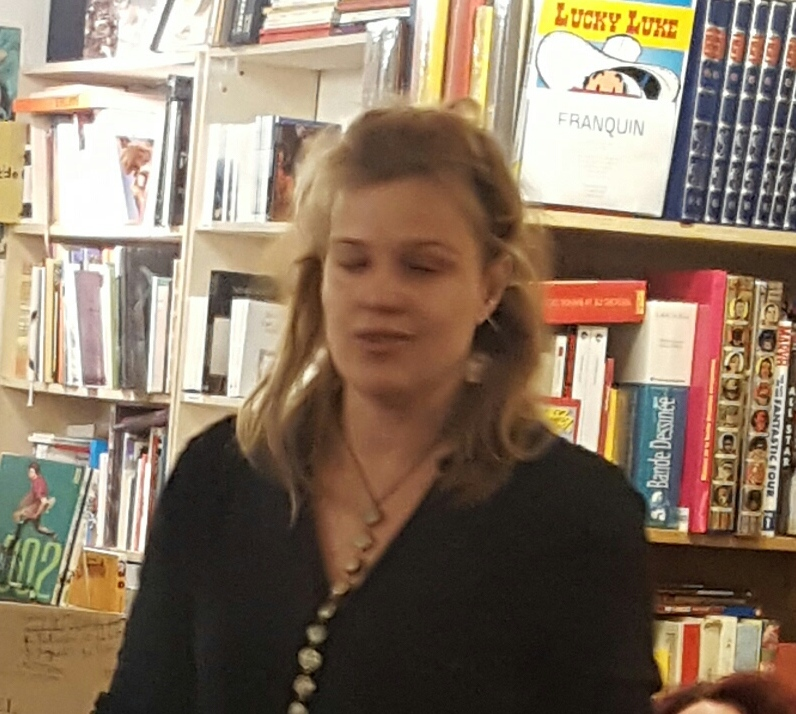
- Moreau in 2017
- Education: Université du Québec à Montréal
- Occupation: Actress
- Website: www.lescountrygirls.com

Sylvie Moreau (French pronunciation: [silvi moˈʁo]), is a Canadian actress.

== Biography ==
At 18, in order to prove to herself that she could earn a living as an actress, she left for a one-year trip to Europe with only eight hundred dollars in her pocket and a "one-way" plane ticket, quitting her studies at Cégep de Maisonneuve. Upon her return in 1985, she studied dramatic art at the Université du Québec à Montréal. She also took a course in body mime with Jean Asselin and Denise Boulanger, a course she followed for five years. She completed a post-synchronization course with Jean Galtier, earning her baccalaureate in 1989.

In 1990, she made her theater debut in an adaptation of Fernando de Rojas Célestine's play there ... under the direction of Jean Asselin personifying Mélibée with the actor, and friend of heart, François Papineau. The same year, from Montreal to Paris, via Brussels, she played the role of Domme in The Last Delirium Permitted, a play written and directed by Jean-Frédéric Messier. For ten years, dedicating herself almost exclusively to creation and theatrical performance, she participated in numerous productions with, among others, the experimental theater company Momentum4.

In 1995, she was in the lineup of improvisers of the National Improvisation League, having a style of play marked by her spontaneity and hyperactivity, until 2003. She made her first TV appearance as Cassandra in the drama series Jasmine broadcast on TVA. In Major and Vaccinated, she played the character of Catherine Beaulieu. She reprised the role in 1998 in the comedy Catherine, that she co-wrote with Stéphane Dubé and Jean-François Léger (directed by Philippe-Louis Martin).

In 1999, she played the psychologist of the Canadian spaceship Romano Fafard, Valence Leclerc of the youth television series Dans une galaxie near you written by Claude Legault and Pierre-Yves Bernard. In 2006 she hosted the Soirée des Masques broadcast on Radio Canada. From 2004 to 2007, with the actors Réal Bossé, Isabelle Brouillette, Salomé Corbo, Daniel Desputeau and François Papineau, she scripted the series Human States which aired on ARTV.

Since 2006, she has formed the duo Les Country Girls with Sandra Dumaresq. They toured with this show combining music and comedy. In October 2013, their album Parties for Glory was released.

Moreau was a regular on the television series (Catherine, Dans une galaxie près de chez-vous). She also performed in multiple stage productions (notably in Les voisins — Compagnie Jean-Duceppe, L’odyssée — CNA and TNM, Un fil à la patte — Théâtre du Rideau Vert and CNA, La salle des loisirs — Théâtre d’Aujourd’hui, and all the Momentum productions) and in film Familia (L. Archambault), Les aimants (Y. Pelletier), Camping sauvage (A. Ducharme), Dans une galaxie près de chez vous (C. Desrosiers), Les immortels (P. Thinnel), Le manuscrit érotique (J.P. Lefebvre) and La bouteille (A. Desrochers).

Her performance in Post Mortem (L. Belanger) won her the Genie Award for Best Actress (2000). She also won the Gémeaux Award for her performance of Catherine in the series of the same name. She's a star of the LNI and hosted the 2002, 2003 and 2004 editions of the Jutra gala. Moreau won a Genie Award in January 2010 for Best Performance by an actress in a leading role for her work in Post Mortem, in which she co-starred with Gabriel Arcand.

== Personal life ==
Both of her parents were teachers and they had 5 children. She had a twin sister, Nathalie, who died of cancer in 2016. Her siblings all went into the acting business as well. Sylvie began a relationship with François Papineau (born 1966, Laval), who is also an actor. The couple met while they co-starred in Célestine. The couple separated after ten years in 2011.

== Selected filmography ==
Year	Title	Role	Other notes
1995	Majeurs et vaccinés	Catherine Beaulieu	
1999	Post Mortem	Linda Faucher	
1999	Catherine	Catherine Beaulieu	
2000	The Bottle (La Bouteille)	Sylvie	
2000	Maelström	Photographer	
2002	Le Manuscrit érotique	Élise	
2004	Love and Magnets (Les Aimants)	Jeanne Tétreault	
2004	Happy Camper (Camping sauvage)	Jackie Pigeon	
2004	Dans une galaxie près de chez vous	Valence Leclerc	
2005	Familia	Michèle	
2007	Taking the Plunge (À vos marques... party!)	Peggy Lamothe	
2008	Daddy Goes Ptarmigan Hunting (Papa à la chasse aux lagopèdes)	Newsreader	
2008	Dans une galaxie près de chez vous 2	Valence Leclerc	Release on April 22, 2008
2009	Taking the Plunge 2 (À vos marques... party! 2)	Peggy Lamothe	
2023	Tell Me Why These Things Are So Beautiful (Dis-moi pourquoi ces choses sont si belles)		
