= Contact, l'encyclopédie de la création =

Television series

Contact, l'encyclopédie de la création is a television series originally broadcast by Quebec's public broadcaster Télé-Québec. Each one-hour program offers an up-close personal portrait of a thinker or creator. This new incarnation of the series is the brainchild of broadcaster Stéphan Bureau who initially created under the title Contact in the early 1990s. Each episode, which is usually shot over the course of two or three days, centers on interviews conducted by Bureau with the featured creator. The complete program is shot on location in settings that are meaningful to the subject.

== Season one ==
In 2006, the first season of Contact, l'encyclopédie de la création was composed of 13 episodes, most of which were shot in Europe.

=== Episode 1: Franco Dragone ===
From La Louvière, Belgium, to Las Vegas, Franco Dragone has had an extensive carrer over the last decade. Dragone directed most of the earliest shows of Cirque du Soleil as well as Céline Dion's A New Day... and Le Rêve presented at the Wynn Las Vegas hotel and casino. In Contact, he tells Bureau what it meant for him after his international success to bring back some hope to his dying mining community by creating his Dragone production company. He also reflects on his creative process and on the fear of having no more to offer to his art.

=== Episode 2: Jean D'Ormesson ===
The quintessential Parisian, Jean D'Ormesson has written extensively about his royalist family and his love of Venice. The son of an ambassador, D'Ormesson became in 1973 the youngest member of the Académie française to which he later contributed getting the first woman ever admitted. In Contact, the 82-year-old writer gets teary eyed saying that his father may have died thinking him a failure.

=== Episode 3: Éric-Emmanuel Schmitt ===
Éric-Emmanuel Schmitt lives in Brussels and his plays have been staged all over the world. He wanted to be a musician but finally turned to philosophy and became a writer.

=== Episode 4: Simone Veil ===
A survivor of the Nazi death camp of Auschwitz Simone Veil later became lawyer, a judge and major political figure in France and at the European Parliament. In Contact, she poignantly recollects how the detainees in the death camp were stripped of any shred of humanity. She saw her mother die from disease in the camps and her father and brother were never heard of again after being deported.

=== Episode 5: Jacques Attali ===
An adviser to French President François Mitterrand, Jacques Attali is an economist, writer and thinker. He was the first president of the European Bank for Reconstruction and Development and later founded PlaNet finance a non-profit organization specializing in Micro credit. The brother of a psychoanalyst, Attali says he always refused to go into analysis because he is scared that the delicate movements of his mind could not be put back together after having been disassembled. He states: "I'm know I am crazy, but I am fine like that."

=== Episode 6: Robert Lepage ===
Quebec-born Robert Lepage is a playwright and director. When he is not in Copenhagen or Tokyo he is working out his Quebec City theater built in an old fire station. Remembering his childhood, Lepage tells Stephan Bureau children don't move me, they can be mean. Much more so than adults.
