= Félix et Ciboulette =

Canadian children's television show

Félix et Ciboulette was a French language children's television show filmed in Quebec City, Quebec. It aired from 1985 to 1989. It was an educational series that aired from Monday to Friday on Télévision de Radio-Canada. Each segment lasted fifteen minutes and revolved around handyman Félix (played by Jean-François Gaudet) and his female cat Ciboulette (a puppet voiced by Diane Garneau). During each episode, Félix would teach Ciboulette about various things, ranging from history to science to agriculture. Although the show targeted children, the depth of educational content was beneficial to the adult viewers as well.

Other characters that sometimes appeared were the neighbour's black dog Noiraud Picard (a puppet voiced by Ginette Guay), a rural friend Raymond (played by Denis Bernard) and his cousin, Ève (played by Céline Bonnier).

Apart from its educational content, Félix et Ciboulette promoted neighbourly behaviour, as well as understanding and tolerance for everyone. Both Félix and Ciboulette enjoyed dressing up to play tricks on each other, making the show pleasant as well as educational.

In between segments played various short cartoons.
