= Lâcher prise =

- Created by: Isabelle Langlois
- Starring: Sophie Cadieux; Sylvie Léonard; Simon Lacroix; Éric Paulhus; Antoine Archambault
- Country of origin: Canada
- No. of seasons: 4
- No. of episodes: 52

Production
- Producers: Vincent Gagné; François Rozon
- Production locations: Montreal, Quebec
- Running time: 30 min.
- Production company: Encore Télévision

Original release
- Network: Ici Radio-Canada Télé
- Release: January 9, 2017 – March 30, 2020

Lâcher prise, also known in English as Freefall or Let Go, is a Canadian television comedy series, which premiered in 2017 on Ici Radio-Canada Télé. The series stars Sophie Cadieux as Valérie Danault, a single mother struggling to keep it together after suffering burnout in her professional and personal life.

The cast also includes Sylvie Léonard as her mother Madeleine; Simon Lacroix as her ex-husband Éric, who left her when he came out as gay; Éric Paulhus as his new husband Kevin; and Antoine Archambault as her son Thomas; as well as Jean-Moïse Martin, Christine Beaulieu, Gildor Roy, Emmanuel Schwartz, Suzanne Champagne and Émilie Bierre.

In 2018, OutTV added the program to its schedule, airing it under the title Freefall with English language subtitles, while the series has been released internationally on Prime Video under the title Let Go.

The series ended in 2020, after the fourth season.

== Awards and nominations ==
Awards and nominations received by Lâcher prise
Award	Year	Category	Nominee(s)	Result	Ref.
Prix Gémeaux	2017	Best Comedy Series	Vincent Gagné, François Rozon	Won	
Prix Gémeaux	2017	Best Actress in a Comedy Series	Sophie Cadieux	Won	
Prix Gémeaux	2017	Best Supporting Actor in a Comedy Series	Simon Lacroix	Nominated	
Prix Gémeaux	2017	Best Supporting Actor in a Comedy Series	Jean-Moïse Martin	Nominated	
Prix Gémeaux	2017	Best Supporting Actor in a Comedy Series	Éric Paulhus	Nominated	
Prix Gémeaux	2017	Best Supporting Actress in a Comedy Series	Sylvie Léonard	Won	
Prix Gémeaux	2017	Best Direction in a Comedy Series	Stéphane Lapointe — "Dormir"	Won	
Prix Gémeaux	2017	Best Writing in a Comedy Series	Isabelle Langlois — "Harmonie du soir"	Won	
Prix Gémeaux	2017	Best Editing	Natalie Lysight — "La crise"	Won	
Prix Gémeaux	2017	Best Casting	Pierre Pageau, Daniel Poisson	Nominated	
Prix Gémeaux	2017	Best Original Music	Sei Nakauchi Pelletier — "Dormir"	Nominated	
Prix Gémeaux	2017	Best Sound, Fiction	Pierre-Jule Audet, Nicolas Dallaire, Stephen Georges de Oliveira, Arnaud Derimay	Nominated	
Prix Gémeaux	2018	Best Comedy Series	Estelle Bouchard, Vincent Gagné, François Rozon	Won	
Prix Gémeaux	2018	Best Actress in a Comedy Series	Sophie Cadieux	Won	
Prix Gémeaux	2018	Best Supporting Actor in a Comedy Series	Simon Lacroix	Won	
Prix Gémeaux	2018	Best Supporting Actor in a Comedy Series	Éric Paulhus	Nominated	
Prix Gémeaux	2018	Best Supporting Actor in a Comedy Series	Emmanuel Schwartz	Nominated	
Prix Gémeaux	2018	Best Supporting Actress in a Comedy Series	Sylvie Léonard	Won	
Prix Gémeaux	2018	Best Direction in a Comedy Series	Sébastien Gagné — "Papillons"	Won	
Prix Gémeaux	2018	Best Writing in a Comedy Series	Isabelle Langlois — "Maelström"	Won	
Prix Gémeaux	2018	Best Casting	Pierre Pageau, Daniel Poisson — "Secret"	Nominated	
Prix Gémeaux	2018	Best Original Music	Sei Nakauchi Pelletier — "Papillons"	Nominated	
Prix Gémeaux	2019	Best Comedy Series	Vincent Gagné, François Rozon	Won	
Prix Gémeaux	2019	Best Actress in a Comedy Series	Sophie Cadieux	Nominated	
Prix Gémeaux	2019	Best Actress in a Comedy Series	Sylvie Léonard	Nominated	
Prix Gémeaux	2019	Best Supporting Actor in a Comedy Series	Simon Lacroix	Nominated	
Prix Gémeaux	2019	Best Supporting Actress in a Comedy Series	Christine Beaulieu	Nominated	
Prix Gémeaux	2019	Best Direction in a Comedy Series	Sébastien Gagné — "À notre étage, les fenêtres ouvrent pas"	Nominated	
Prix Gémeaux	2019	Best Writing in a Comedy Series	Isabelle Langlois — "À notre étage, les fenêtres ouvrent pas"	Nominated	
Prix Gémeaux	2019	Best Editing in a Comedy Series	François Larochelle — "À notre étage, les fenêtres ouvrent pas"	Nominated	
Prix Gémeaux	2020	Best Comedy Series	Vincent Gagné, François Rozon, Nathalie Tremblay	Won	
Prix Gémeaux	2020	Best Actress in a Comedy Series	Sophie Cadieux	Won	
Prix Gémeaux	2020	Best Supporting Actor in a Comedy Series	Éric Paulhus	Nominated	
Prix Gémeaux	2020	Best Supporting Actress in a Comedy Series	Christine Beaulieu	Won	
Prix Gémeaux	2020	Best Direction in a Comedy Series	Sébastien Gagné — "Voir que j’ai fait exprès"	Won	
Prix Gémeaux	2020	Best Writing in a Comedy Series	Isabelle Langlois — "Voir que j’ai fait exprès"	Won	
