= A Show from Two Cities =

1963 Canadian variety show

- De ville en ville (French)
- Written by: Eloi de Grandmont; Jean Rafa; Bernard Rothman; Gerald Tasse
- Country of origin: Canada
- Original languages: English; French
- No. of seasons: 1
- No. of episodes: 4

Production
- Running time: 60 minutes

Original release
- Network: CBC Television; Radio-Canada
- Release: 17 November 1963 – 20 May 1964

A Show from Two Cities (French: De ville en ville) is a Canadian variety show that aired on CBC Television from 1963 to 1964.

== Premise ==
Four hour-long episodes of this variety show were produced from Toronto and Montreal for simulcast on both CBC English and French networks.

The debut, "Deux villes se rencontrent", aired 17 November 1963 featuring Bill Cole, Shirley Harmer, Lise Lasalle and Pierre Thériault. The concept was that performers of one city would base their material on their views of the other city. Guests included Jean Cavall, Rene Claude, Claire Gagnier, Don Gillies, Barbara Hamilton, Monique Leyrac, Doug Romaine, the Gino Silvi Octet and Richard Verreau. Lucio Agostini led the music while Alan Lund was choreographer. Roger Fournier and Don Hudson produced this episode.

The second episode aired 25 December 1963. Guests included singers and comedians such as Elaine Bédard, Henri Bergeron, Earl Cameron, Corinne Conley, Miville Couture, Fred Davis, Steve Douglas, Paul Dupuis, Jean-Pierre Ferland, Roger Garceau, Monique Gaube, Yolande Guerarde, Olivier Guimond, Paul Kligman, René Lecavalier, Juliette Pétrie, Joyce Sullivan, Jimmy Tapp and Richard Verreau. Jacques Blouin, Don Brown and Bob Jarvis produced this program.

Episode number three on 22 March 1964 featured Paul Berval, Jean Christopher, Robert Demontigny, Nina Deschamps and Glenn Gibson (dancers), Denis Drouin, Olivier Guimond, Shirley Harmer, Larry D. Mann, Jacques Normand and Deborah Wittman. Lucio Agostini, Ray Smith and Rick Wilkins provided music. Bob Jarvis and Roger Fournier were the producers.

Finally, the episode on 20 May 1964, was based on the theme of spring and featured guests Elaine Bédard, Paul Berval, Denis Drouin, Felix Fitzgerald, Olivier Guimond, Nora Johnstone, Monique Leyrac, Michel Louvin, Dominique Michel, Sylvia Murphy, Jack Robertson, Marilyn Rollo plus Wayne and Shuster. Paul de Margerie was musical director with Bob Jarvis and Roger Fournier were the producers.
