= Shopping TVA (TV program) =

- Also known as: Télé-Achats (1996-1997); Boutique TVA (1997-2003); La Boutique STV Shopping TV (2003-2005); TVA Boutiques (2012-2013)
- Genre: Home shopping
- Presented by: Louise-Josée Mondoux
- Starring: Julie Nault (host); Mario Beaurivage (physical fitness expert); Mélanie Marchand (kitchen expert); Marie-Johanne Martineau (beauty care expert)
- Country of origin: Canada
- Original language: French

Production
- Production locations: Montreal, Quebec

Original release
- Network: TVA (1996-2013); Télé Achats (2003-2012)
- Release: 1996 – August 30, 2013

Shopping TVA is a Canadian French language television shopping program that was broadcast on the Canadian television networks Télé Achats and TVA, from 1996 to August 30, 2013.

Shopping TVA consisted of hosts along with product representatives demonstrating and selling products to television viewers. The program feature the sale of a variety of products including beauty and personal care, entertainment, health and fitness, and home improvement items.

Shopping TVA was hosted by Louise-Josée Mondoux and his team with Julie Nault (host), Mario Beaurivage (physical fitness expert), Mélanie Marchand (kitchen expert) and Marie-Johanne Martineau (beauty care expert).

Viewers could purchase items either by telephone or internet.

== History ==
Boutique TVA logo from 1997 to 2003

In 1996 and 1997, TVA debuted a home shopping television program known as Télé-Achats, hosted by Louise-Josée Mondoux and Serge Laprade.

In 1997, TVAchats Inc. was founded in partnership with the French company Home Shopping Service.

From 1997, the TV program was known as Boutique TVA, hosted only by Louise-Josée Mondoux until 2003.

La Boutique STV Shopping TV logo from 2003 to 2005

On March 18, 2003, TVAchats Inc. became a wholly owned subsidiary of Groupe TVA.

In 2003, the TV program was renamed La Boutique STV Shopping TV, hosted by Louise-Josée Mondoux and several alternating animators until 2013.

Logo used on TV show website after closure of network

In 2005, the TV program was renamed Shopping TVA. Shopping TVA was also known as TVA Boutiques in 2012 and 2013.

On June 13, 2013, Groupe TVA announced the closure of TVA Boutiques for the August 30, 2013. At the same time, TVA had confirmed that Shopping TVA TV program would not return the following fall at its programming.
