= La bonne aventure =

La bonne aventure (Fortune telling) is a French-Canadian soap opera TV series which ran from 1982 to 1986 for a total of 143 episodes. It became one of the more popular and successful television series in Quebec during its tenure.

== Cast ==
- Nathalie Gascon as Martine Poliquin
- Christiane Pasquier as Anne Demers-Leroux
- Joanne Côté as Hélène Savoie
- Michelle Léger as Michèle Dalpé-Martin
- Jean-René Ouellet as Hubert Girard
- Serge Dupire as Benoît Leroux
