= Le Traboulidon =

Traboulidon was a French language children's television show made in Quebec in the mid-1980s on Ici Radio-Canada Télé. Its stories revolved around the adventures of Philo (an inventor played by Denis Mercier) and Bulle (played by Sylvie Léonard).

Due to an accident, they were both trapped in a computer game of Philo's invention, and in every episode had to beat a "level" to try to advance further and finally be able to leave.

Among various recurring characters, one (always played by Alain Gélinas) would appear as different bad guys of the week but always having a name containing "nespa" ("n'est-ce pas?", meaning "isn't it?"). Although they, of course always recognised him, he never did or at least never acknowledged he knew them.
