= Sol et Gobelet =

Television series

Sol et Gobelet was a French language children's television show made in Quebec, which was broadcast from 1968 to 1971 on Radio-Canada. Its stories revolved around the adventures of clowns Sol (played by Marc Favreau) and Gobelet (played by Luc Durand).
