= L'Union fait la force (game show) =

- Presented by: Patrice L'Écuyer
- Country of origin: Canada
- No. of seasons: 9

Production
- Production locations: Maison Radio-Canada; Montreal, Quebec
- Running time: 30 minutes (including commercials)
- Production company: Société Radio-Canada

Original release
- Network: Ici Radio-Canada Télé
- Release: September 1, 2003 – April 17, 2015

L'Union fait la force ("Unity Makes Strength" or "Strength Through Unity") is a French language game show airing weekdays on Ici Radio-Canada Télé. It is hosted by Patrice L'Écuyer.

The content of the show are primarily "quizzes" that pertain to words in the French language. The quizzes range from everything from guessing words (in which the vowels are removed) all the way up to Pictionary-style games.

The game consists of two teams, made up of four competitors and supporters behind them. The team represents the organization. The teams compete for points via the abovementioned "quizzes". The team that earns the most points wins a prize of C$1,000.

Tuesday and Thursday editions of the show include a special round, La petite école ("The Little School"), in which contestants answer questions written by elementary and secondary school students, with each question pertaining to a grade level (similar to Are You Smarter Than a 5th Grader?).
