= Ligue nationale d'improvisation =

The Ligue nationale d'improvisation (LNI) (French for "National Improvisation League") is an improvisational comedy theatre company created in Quebec. Most of the participants are thespians, comedians or humorists. The Improvisation League format has spread to France, Belgium, Switzerland, Italy and Argentina.

== Description ==
Although the format has evolved over the years, it has always included humor, improvisation, and certain characteristics inspired by hockey: hockey jerseys, referees, and an audience that surrounds the performance area, which looks like a hockey rink.

Teams in the league are made up of six members: three men and three women. A referee chooses at random a topic that the participants must act out. The teams are given 20 seconds for a preparatory "caucus" to decide how to play the scene. After the scene, the audience votes for the winner by holding up cardboard signs displaying the color of the team they like.

Each scene or round is worth one point. The team with the most points at the end of the match wins. A referee can also subtract points from a team's score if members break the improvisational theatre rules. If a team protests a judge's decision, the judge must justify his or her decision. The audience can also boo decisions they don't like.

Each round lasts from thirty seconds to twenty minutes.

== History ==
The Improvisational League was created by Robert Gravel and Yvon Leduc in Montreal in 1977. It became very popular in the 1980s and many cities organized improvisation competitions.

In December 1982 the final of the sixth season of the LNI was broadcast by Télé-Québec, which led to even greater popularity. Teams and leagues sprouted up all over Quebec. From then on and until 1988, LNI matches were broadcast on TV by Télé-Québec.

During the 1980s, the LNI traveled to face the best improv teams of France, which led to the formation of the Ligue d'improvisation française (French Improvisation League). They also played matches in Belgium and Switzerland, which led to national improvisation leagues being formed in those countries. In 1985, the first Improvisation World Cup brought together teams from Canada, France, Belgium, and Switzerland in Montreal, Quebec.
