= Conservatoire d'art dramatique de Montréal =

Canadian dramatic school

Coordinates: 45.5239°N 73.5865°W

The Conservatoire d'art dramatique de Montréal is a Canadian government-funded dramatic school founded in 1954. The first director was Jan Doat. He was succeeded by Jean Valcourt in 1955 on the condition that a branch also be opened in Quebec City, which occurred in 1958. The school is now a branch of the Conservatoire de musique et d'art dramatique du Québec.

Since the fall of 2001, it has been housed in the Henri-Julien building on the Plateau Mont-Royal, which also houses the Conservatoire de musique de Montréal. A major fire broke out on December 7, 2005. A few months later, the Government of Quebec announced a $46 million investment to create permanent premises at the same location. In addition to the teaching and rehearsal facilities, the Conservatoire's two Montreal institutions have had a 226-seat theater, a 225-seat concert hall, and a 100-seat recital hall at their disposal since 2008.
