= 2008–09 Canadian network television schedule =

The 2008–09 Canadian network television schedule indicates the fall prime time schedules for Canada's major English and French broadcast networks. For schedule changes after the fall launch, please consult each network's individual article.

Canadian content shows in the tables have a	red	highlight.

== 2009 official summer schedule ==
=== Sunday ===
PM	7:00	7:30	8:00	8:30	9:00	9:30	10:00	10:30
CBC	Heartland		Movies & Specials				CBC News: Sunday Night	
CTV	Star Wars: The Clone Wars	Degrassi: The Next Generation	The Amazing Race		Desperate Housewives		The Listener	
Global	Da Kink in My Hair	Billable Hours	The Simpsons	King of the Hill	Family Guy	American Dad!	Brothers & Sisters	
A	America's Funniest Home Videos		Gossip Girl		Cold Case		Mad Men	
Citytv	NFL Football	Two and a Half Men	Valentine		Easy Money		Crusoe	
E!	Instant Beauty Pageant		Extreme Makeover: Home Edition		E! Specials		E! Showcase	
Radio-Canada	Découverte	Et Dieu créa Laflaque	Tout le monde en parle				Le Téléjournal	
TVA	La Cour des grands	Le Banquier		Dieu merci!		Le TVA Week-end	Movies	
TQS	Loft Story	Drôle, drôle, drôle	Movies					

=== Monday ===
PM	7:00	7:30	8:00	8:30	9:00	9:30	10:00	10:30
CBC	Coronation Street	Jeopardy!	Triple Sensation		Just for Laughs		The National	
CTV	eTalk	Access Hollywood	Dancing with the Stars			Corner Gas	CSI: Miami	
Global	ET Canada	Entertainment Tonight	Prison Break		Heroes		My Own Worst Enemy	
A	Robson Arms	TMZ	Terminator: The Sarah Connor Chronicles		Two and a Half Men	Samantha Who?	The Mentalist	
Citytv	Law & Order: Special Victims Unit		Chuck		Celebrity Fit Club		Curb Your Enthusiasm	Less Than Kind
E!	The Insider	E! News	'Til Death	How I Met Your Mother	Do Not Disturb	Worst Week	Boston Legal	
Radio-Canada	Virginie	La Grosse vie	L'Auberge du chien noir		Les Hauts et les bas de Sophie Paquin		Le Téléjournal	
TVA	Star Académie		Annie et ses hommes		Dr House		Le TVA 22 heures	
TQS	C't'une joke	Loft Story	CSI: NY		Bob Gratton: Ma Vie	Les Voisines d'à côté	110%	

=== Tuesday ===
PM	7:00	7:30	8:00	8:30	9:00	9:30	10:00	10:30
CBC	Coronation Street	Jeopardy!	Mansbridge One on One	Land and Sea	Being Erica		The National	
CTV	eTalk	Access Hollywood	Without a Trace		Dancing with the Stars		Law & Order: Special Victims Unit	
Global	ET Canada	Entertainment Tonight	House		90210		Kitchen Nightmares	
A	Robson Arms	TMZ	Pushing Daisies		Fringe		Eli Stone	
Citytv	Law & Order: Special Victims Unit		Privileged		Opportunity Knocks		Nip/Tuck	
E!	The Insider	E! News	The Biggest Loser				The Best Years	
Radio-Canada	Virginie	La Facture	Providence		Roxy	C.A./Les Boys	Le Téléjournal	
TVA	Occupation Double	Drôles de vidéos	Histoires de filles	Caméra Café	La Promesse		Le TVA 22 heures	
TQS	Beauté express	Loft Story	Génération séduction		Vérité choc		110%	

=== Wednesday ===
PM	7:00	7:30	8:00	8:30	9:00	9:30	10:00	10:30
CBC	Coronation Street	Jeopardy!	Dragons' Den				The National	
CTV	eTalk	Access Hollywood	So You Think You Can Dance Canada		Criminal Minds		CSI: NY	
Global	ET Canada	Entertainment Tonight	Bones		NCIS		The Guard	
A	Robson Arms	TMZ	America's Next Top Model		Private Practice		Dirty Sexy Money	
Citytv	Law & Order: Special Victims Unit		Glam God		Stylista		Lipstick Jungle	
E!	The Insider	E! News	Knight Rider		Deal or No Deal		E! True Hollywood Story	
Radio-Canada	Virginie	L'Épicerie	Le Match des étoiles		Une Heure sur terre		Le Téléjournal	
TVA	Occupation Double	La Poule aux oeufs d'or	Destinées		Les Soeurs Elliot		Le TVA 22 heures	
TQS	450, Chemin du Golf	Loft Story	Movies				110%	

=== Thursday ===
PM	7:00	7:30	8:00	8:30	9:00	9:30	10:00	10:30
CBC	Coronation Street	Jeopardy!	Doc Zone				The National	
CTV	eTalk	Access Hollywood	CSI		Grey's Anatomy		ER	
Global	ET Canada	Entertainment Tonight	Survivor: Gabon		The Office	Kath & Kim	Life on Mars	
A	Robson Arms	TMZ	The Moment of Truth		America's Next Top Model		Eleventh Hour	
Citytv	Law & Order: Special Victims Unit		Ugly Betty		Rock of Love		Friends	Friends
E!	The Insider	E! News	My Name is Earl		E! Movies We Love			
Radio-Canada	Virginie	Infoman	Les Parent	Les étoiles filantes	Enquête		Le Téléjournal	
TVA	La Fièvre de la danse		Occupation Double			Vlog	Le TVA 22 heures	
TQS	Grande fille	Loft Story	Movies				110%	

=== Friday ===
PM	7:00	7:30	8:00	8:30	9:00	9:30	10:00	10:30
CBC	Coronation Street	Jeopardy!	Royal Canadian Air Farce	Mansbridge One on One	Wild Roses		The National	
CTV	eTalk	Access Hollywood	Ghost Whisperer		Supernanny		Flashpoint	
Global	ET Canada	Entertainment Tonight	Life		The Ex List		Numb3rs	
A	Robson Arms	TMZ	Wife Swap		Don't Forget the Lyrics!		Stargate SG-1	
Citytv	Law & Order: Special Victims Unit		Crusoe		The Secret Life of the American Teenager		Kaya	Everybody Hates Chris
E!	The Insider	E! News	Are You Smarter than a 5th Grader?		Deal or No Deal		20/20	
Radio-Canada	Virginie		Paquet voleur		Specials		Le Téléjournal	
TVA	JE		Du talent à revendre		Juste pour rire		Le TVA 22 heures	
TQS	Métier policier	Loft Story	Scrap métal	Poursuites policières	Knockout		110%	

=== Saturday ===
PM	7:00	7:30	8:00	8:30	9:00	9:30	10:00	10:30
CBC	Hockey Night in Canada							
CTV	W-Five		Crimetime Saturday				Law & Order: Special Victims Unit	
Global	Global Currents		Risk Takers		Mutant X		renegadepress.com	
A	Road to Avonlea		The Big Picture				Comedy Now!	Comedy Inc.
Citytv	Survivorman		Great Movies				Less Than Kind	Kaya
E!	A Night with E!							
Radio-Canada	Grands rires 2007		Le Moment de vérité		Dre Grey		Le Téléjournal	
TVA	Movies							
TQS	Movies							

== Top weekly ratings ==
- Note: English Canadian television only by viewers age 2 and up
- "official website". bbm.ca. Archived from the original on January 18, 2010.

Week	Name	Viewers (in millions)	Network
September 1-September 7	Bones	1.663	Global
September 8-September 14	Fringe	1.539	CTV
September 15-September 21	House	2.684	Global
September 22-September 28	CSI: Miami	2.767	CTV
September 29-October 5	House	2.324	Global
October 6-October 12	CSI: Crime Scene Investigation	3.163	CTV
October 13-October 19	Grey's Anatomy	2.563	CTV
October 20-October 26	Grey's Anatomy	2.567	CTV
October 27-November 2	Grey's Anatomy	2.249	CTV
November 3-November 9	Grey's Anatomy	2.255	CTV
November 10-November 16	Grey's Anatomy	2.387	CTV
November 17-November 23	Criminal Minds	2.456	CTV
November 24-November 30	Criminal Minds	2.384	CTV
December 1-December 7	Grey's Anatomy	2.295	CTV
December 8-December 14	CSI: Crime Scene Investigation	2.891	CTV
December 15-December 21	Criminal Minds	2.103	CTV
December 22-December 28	House	1.186	Global
December 29-January 4	World Junior Ice Hockey Semi finals	1.855	TSN
January 5-January 11	World Junior Ice Hockey Final	3.684	TSN
January 12-January 18	CSI: Crime Scene Investigation	2.566	CTV
January 19-January 25	House	2.425	Global
January 26-February 1	Super Bowl XLIII	3.602	CTV
February 2-February 8	House	2.883	Global
February 9-February 15	Grey's Anatomy	2.300	CTV
February 16-February 22	81st Academy Awards	4.465	CTV
February 23-March 1	CSI: Crime Scene Investigation	2.740	CTV
March 2-March 8	CSI: Crime Scene Investigation	2.474	CTV
March 9-March 15	House	2.313	Global
March 16-March 22	House	2.476	Global
March 23-March 29	Grey's Anatomy	2.375	CTV
March 30-April 5	ER	2.768	CTV
April 6-April 12	CSI: Crime Scene Investigation	2.265	CTV
April 13-April 19	Corner Gas	2.914	CTV
April 20-April 26	American Idol	2.304	CTV
April 27-May 3	American Idol	2.267	CTV
May 4-May 10	American Idol	2.465	CTV
May 11-May 17	Grey's Anatomy	2.237	CTV
May 18-May 24	American Idol	2.622	CTV
May 25-May 31	2009 Stanley Cup playoffs	1.803	CBC
June 1-June 7	2009 Stanley Cup Finals	1.786	CBC
June 8-June 14	2009 Stanley Cup Finals	3.064	CBC
June 15-June 21	So You Think You Can Dance	1.632	CTV
June 22-June 28	So You Think You Can Dance	1.492	CTV
June 29-July 5	So You Think You Can Dance	1.527	CTV
July 6-July 12	So You Think You Can Dance	1.656	CTV
July 13-July 19	So You Think You Can Dance	1.606	CTV
July 20-July 26	So You Think You Can Dance	1.937	CTV
July 27-August 2	So You Think You Can Dance	1.504	CTV
August 3-August 9	So You Think You Can Dance	1.853	CTV
August 10-August 16	CSI: Crime Scene Investigation	1.306	CTV
August 17-August 23	Big Brother	1.226	Global
August 24-August 30	So You Think You Can Dance Canada	1.357	CTV
