= 2009–10 Canadian network television schedule =

The 2009–10 Canadian network television schedule indicates the fall prime time schedules for Canada's major English and French broadcast networks. For schedule changes after the fall launch, please consult each network's individual article.

Note: TQS rebrands as the V Network

Canadian content shows in the tables have a	red	highlight.

== 2010 official winter schedule ==
=== Sunday ===
PM	7:00	7:30	8:00	8:30	9:00	9:30	10:00	10:30
CBC	America's Funniest Home Videos		Mansbridge One on One	Land and Sea	Being Erica		The National	
CTV	Degrassi: The Next Generation	Degrassi: The Next Generation	The Amazing Race		Desperate Housewives		Cold Case	
Global	King of the Hill	The Simpsons	The Simpsons	The Cleveland Show	Family Guy	American Dad!	Brothers & Sisters	
A	TMZ on TV	TMZ on TV	America's Next Top Model		Law & Order: SVU		Spectacle: Elvis Costello with...	
Citytv	NFL Football	Survivorman	Extreme Makeover: Home Edition		Murdoch Mysteries		Conviction Kitchen	
Radio-Canada	Découverte	Et Dieu créa Laflaque	Tout le monde en parle					Le Téléjournal
TVA	Juste Pour Rire	Le Banquier		Dieu merci!		Le TVA Week-end	Movies	
V	A contrario		Cinéma					

=== Monday ===
PM	7:00	7:30	8:00	8:30	9:00	9:30	10:00	10:30
CBC	Wheel of Fortune	Jeopardy!	Little Mosque on the Prairie	47 To Life	Halifax Comedy	Winnipeg Comedy	The National	
CTV	eTalk	Access Hollywood	Dancing with the Stars				CSI: Miami	
Global	ET Canada	Entertainment Tonight	House		Lie to Me		Heroes	
A	Degrassi: The Next Generation	TMZ	Gossip Girl		Two and a Half Men	The Big Bang Theory	Castle	
Citytv	Law & Order: Special Victims Unit		How I Met Your Mother	Accidentally on Purpose	Trauma		The Jay Leno Show	
Radio-Canada	Virginie	Les Parent II	L'Auberge du chien noir		Destination santé		Le Téléjournal	
TVA	La Classe de 5e		Yama		Le Gentleman		Le TVA 22 heures	
V	La Maison de J.Villeneuve	Rire et délire	CSI: NY		Lie To Me		South Park	L'Attaque à 5

=== Tuesday ===
PM	7:00	7:30	8:00	8:30	9:00	9:30	10:00	10:30
CBC	Wheel of Fortune	Jeopardy!	Heartland				The National	
CTV	eTalk	Access Hollywood	So You Think You Can Dance Canada		Dancing with the Stars		Law & Order: Special Victims Unit	
Global	ET Canada	Entertainment Tonight	NCIS		NCIS: Los Angeles		The Good Wife	
A	Degrassi: The Next Generation	TMZ	''So You Think You Can Dance				The Big Picture	
Citytv	Law & Order: Special Victims Unit		The Biggest Loser				The Jay Leno Show	
Radio-Canada	Virginie	La Facture	Providence		La galère		Le Téléjournal	
TVA	Les Gags	Occupation Double	Caméra Café	Taxi 0-22	La promesse		Le TVA 22 heures	
V	La Guerre des clics	Rire et délire	Vérité-choc		Le Mentaliste		South Park	L'Attaque à 5

=== Wednesday ===
PM	7:00	7:30	8:00	8:30	9:00	9:30	10:00	10:30
CBC	Wheel of Fortune	Jeopardy!	Murdoch Mysteries		The Tudors		The National	
CTV	eTalk	So You Think You Can Dance Canada	America's Next Top Model		Criminal Minds		CSI: NY	
Global	ET Canada	Entertainment Tonight	Bones		Glee		Melrose Place	
A	Degrassi: The Next Generation	TMZ	So You Think You Can Dance		The Middle	Hank	Eastwick	
Citytv	Law & Order: Special Victims Unit		Parenthood		Modern Family	Cougar Town	The Jay Leno Show	
Radio-Canada	Virginie	L'Épicerie	Musée Éden		Les Hauts et les bas de Sophie Paquin		Le Téléjournal	
TVA	Occupation Double	La Poule aux oeufs d'or	Destinées		Lance et compte: Le grand duel		Le TVA 22 heures	
V	450, Chemin du Golf	Rire et délire	Distraction		Bienvenue aux Dames	Bob Gratton	South Park	L'Attaque à 5

=== Thursday ===
PM		7:00	7:30	8:00	8:30	9:00	9:30	10:00	10:30
CBC		Wheel of Fortune	Jeopardy!	Doc Zone		The Border		The National	
CTV		The Vampire Diaries		CSI		Grey's Anatomy		The Mentalist	
Global		ET Canada	Entertainment Tonight	Survivor: Gabon		The Office	The Office (R)	90210	
A		Degrassi: The Next Generation	TMZ	FlashForward		Fringe		Private Practice	
Citytv	Fall	Law & Order: Special Victims Unit		Community	Parks and Recreation	30 Rock (R)	30 Rock	The Jay Leno Show	
Citytv	January	Ugly Betty		Community	Parks and Recreation	30 Rock (R)	30 Rock	The Jay Leno Show	
Radio-Canada		Virginie	Infoman	Enquête		Musique		Le Téléjournal	
TVA		La Fièvre de la danse		Occupation Double			Vlog	Le TVA 22 heures	
V		Taxi Payant QC	Rire et délire	Fringe		Private Practice		South Park	L'Attaque à 5

=== Friday ===
PM	7:00	7:30	8:00	8:30	9:00	9:30	10:00	10:30
CBC	Wheel of Fortune	Jeopardy!	Marketplace	Mansbridge One on One	The Fifth Estate		The National	
CTV	eTalk	Access Hollywood	Ghost Whisperer		Southland		Flashpoint	
Global	ET Canada	Entertainment Tonight	The Guard		Dollhouse		Numb3rs	
A	Degrassi: The Next Generation	TMZ	Law and Order		Medium		Comedy Now!	Comedy Inc.
Citytv	Law & Order: Special Victims Unit		Supernanny		Ugly Betty		The Jay Leno Show	
Radio-Canada	Virginie		Paquet voleur		Specials		Le Téléjournal	
TVA	JE		Du talent à revendre		Dr House		Le TVA 22 heures	
V	Top Gear		Cinéma				South Park	L'Attaque à 5

=== Saturday ===
PM	7:00	7:30	8:00	8:30	9:00	9:30	10:00	10:30
CBC	Wheel of Fortune	Jeopardy!	Murdoch Mysteries		Republic of Doyle		The National	
CTV	W-Five		Crimetime Saturday				Law & Order: Special Victims Unit	
Global	renegadepress.com	16:9	Movies				Project Runway Canada	
A	Road to Avonlea		Movies				Whistler	
Citytv	Murdoch Mysteries		Ford Model Search		Movies			
Radio-Canada	Grands rires 2007		Frères et sœurs		Dre Grey		Le Téléjournal	
TVA	Movies							
V	L'Amour est aveugle		Entourage		Californication		UFC: Les Guerries Boxe Gym	

== Top weekly ratings ==
- Note: English Canadian television only by viewers age 2 and up
- "2009-10 National Top Program Reports Archive". BBM Canada.

Week	Name	Viewers (in millions)	Network
August 31 – September 6	Big Brother	1.809	Global
September 7 – September 13	Big Brother	1.789	Global
September 14 – September 20	Survivor: Samoa	3.208	Global
September 21 – September 27	House	4.426	Global
September 28 – October 4	House	3.648	Global
October 5 – October 11	House	3.623	Global
October 12 – October 18	House	3.099	Global
October 19 – October 25	House	3.701	Global
October 28 – November 1	Grey's Anatomy	3.096	CTV
November 2 – November 8	Survivor: Samoa	3.048	Global
November 9 – November 15	CSI: NY	3.466	CTV
November 16 – November 22	House	2.955	Global
November 23 – November 29	97th Grey Cup	5.087	TSN
November 30 – December 6	The Amazing Race	3.074	CTV
December 7 – December 13	Survivor: Samoa	2.775	Global
December 14 – December 20	Survivor: Samoa	2.735	Global
December 21 – December 27	2010 World Junior Ice Hockey Championships	2.521	TSN
December 28 – January 3	2010 World Junior Ice Hockey Championships	3.223	TSN
January 4 – January 10	2010 World Junior Ice Hockey Championships	5.265	TSN
January 11 – January 17	American Idol	3.167	CTV
January 18 – January 24	American Idol	3.191	CTV
January 25 – January 31	American Idol	3.160	CTV
February 1 – February 7	Super Bowl XLIV	6.017	CTV
February 8 – February 14	2010 Winter Olympics opening ceremony	13.283	Various
February 15 – February 21	2010 Winter Olympics	2.827	CTV
February 22 – February 28	Men's Hockey Gold	16.639	Various
March 1 – March 7	82nd Academy Awards	5.889	CTV
March 8 – March 14	House	2.866	Global
March 15 – March 21	House	2.640	Global
March 22 – March 28	American Idol	2.896	CTV
March 29 – April 4	Survivor: Heroes vs. Villains	2.642	Global
April 5 – April 11	Survivor: Heroes vs. Villains	2.911	Global
April 12 – April 18	Survivor: Heroes vs. Villains	2.939	Global
April 19 – April 25	Survivor: Heroes vs. Villains	2.778	Global
April 26 – May 2	Survivor: Heroes vs. Villains	2.864	Global
May 3 – May 9	Survivor: Heroes vs. Villains	2.800	Global
May 10 – May 16	Stanley Cup Playoffs	3.247	CBC
May 17 – May 23	Grey's Anatomy	3.014	CTV
May 24 – May 30	American Idol	3.328	CTV
May 31 – June 6	Stanley Cup Finals	2.880	CBC
June 7 – June 13	Stanley Cup Finals	4.077	CBC
June 14 – June 20	America's Got Talent	1.587	Citytv
June 21 – June 27	2010 FIFA World Cup	1.968	CBC
June 28 – July 4	2010 FIFA World Cup	1.892	CBC
July 5 – July 11	2010 FIFA World Cup	5.131	CBC
July 12 – July 18	Big Brother	1.869	Global
July 19 – July 25	Rookie Blue	1.805	Global
July 26 – August 1	Big Brother	1.698	Global
August 2 – August 8	Big Brother	1.870	Global
August 9 – August 15	Big Brother	1.925	Global
August 16 – August 22	Big Brother	1.927	Global
August 23 – August 29	62nd Primetime Emmy Awards	2.429	CTV
