= 2007–08 Canadian network television schedule =

The 2007–08 Canadian network television schedule indicates the fall prime time schedules for Canada's major English and French broadcast networks. For schedule changes after the fall launch, please consult each network's individual article.

Canadian content shows in the tables have a	red	highlight.

== Changes ==
CTVglobemedia's takeover of the A-Channel stations was approved by the CRTC during the summer. As a result, the CTV and A-Channel schedules were adjusted from the original upfronts announcements, with CTV bumping several of its scheduled replacement shows to the secondary system. The fall schedule that actually debuted on A-Channel, in fact, was not fully announced until the end of September 2007, when CTV announced that The Big Bang Theory and Two and a Half Men, both originally scheduled to air on CTV following the end of Dancing with the Stars, would instead premiere on A-Channel in sync with their American launches. CTV also later bumped Dirty Sexy Money and Big Shots to A-Channel, each several weeks after their premieres on CTV.

== 2007 official fall schedule ==
=== Sunday ===
PM	7:00	7:30	8:00	8:30	9:00	9:30	10:00	10:30
CBC	Heartland		Movies & Specials				CBC News: Sunday Night	
CTV	Law and Order: Criminal Intent		Cold Case		Desperate Housewives		Dirty Sexy Money	
Global	The Simpsons	Da Kink in My Hair	The Simpsons	King of the Hill	Family Guy	American Dad!	Brothers & Sisters	
A-Channel	America's Funniest Home Videos		Kyle XY		America's Next Top Model		Stargate SG-1	
Citytv	Everybody Hates Chris	Speakers' Corner	Behind the Movies	Bravo!Fact Presents	Great Movies			
E!	Viva Laughlin		Extreme Makeover: Home Edition		E! Countdowns		E! Live Encore	
Radio-Canada	Découverte	Et Dieu créa Laflaque	Tout le monde en parle				Le Téléjournal	
TVA	Le Banquier/Dieu merci!		Occupation Double				Le TVA Week-end	
TQS	Loft Story	Movies						Le Journal weekend

=== Monday ===
PM	7:00	7:30	8:00	8:30	9:00	9:30	10:00	10:30
CBC	Coronation Street	Fashion File	Dragons' Den		Intelligence		The National	
CTV	eTalk	Jeopardy!	Dancing with the Stars			Corner Gas	CSI: Miami	
Global	ET Canada	Entertainment Tonight	Prison Break		Heroes		Journeyman	
A-Channel	Wheel of Fortune	e2	Grand Star	The Big Bang Theory	Two and a Half Men	Samantha Who?	Monk	
Citytv	Friends	Access Hollywood	Blood Ties		Stargate SG-1		The Bachelor	
E!	The Insider	E! News	Deal or No Deal		K-Ville		Rich Kids	
Radio-Canada	Virginie	Rumeurs	L'Auberge du chien noir		Les hauts et les bas de Sophie Paquin		Le Téléjournal	
TVA	Occupation Double	Le cœur a ses raisons	Annie et ses hommes		Dr. House		Le TVA 22 heures	
TQS	Loft Story	TAC	CSI: NY		Bob Gratton: Ma Vie	3 x rien	Le Journal du soir	

=== Tuesday ===
PM	7:00	7:30	8:00	8:30	9:00	9:30	10:00	10:30
CBC	Coronation Street	Just for Laughs	Rick Mercer Report	This Hour Has 22 Minutes	The Tudors		The National	
CTV	Gossip Girl		Pushing Daisies		Dancing with the Stars		Law & Order: Special Victims Unit	
Global	ET Canada	Entertainment Tonight	NCIS		House		Cane	
A-Channel	Wheel of Fortune	e2	Jeff Ltd.	Bravo!Fact Presents	The Big Picture			
Citytv	Friends	Access Hollywood	Beauty & the Geek		Chuck		Reaper	
E!	The Insider	E! News	The Biggest Loser		Dr. 90210		Boston Legal	
Radio-Canada	Virginie	La Facture	Providence		Les Boys	C.A.	Le Téléjournal	
TVA	Occupation Double	Histoires de filles	km/h	Caméra Café	La Promesse		Le TVA 22 heures	
TQS	Loft Story	Rois de la pop	90 minutes de bonheur			À Hollywood	Le Journal du soir	

=== Wednesday ===
PM	7:00	7:30	8:00	8:30	9:00	9:30	10:00	10:30
CBC	Coronation Street	Marketplace	Little Mosque on the Prairie	No Opportunity Wasted	The Fifth Estate		The National	
CTV	eTalk	Jeopardy!	Private Practice		Criminal Minds		CSI: NY	
Global	ET Canada	Entertainment Tonight	Back to You	'Til Death	Bones		Life	
A-Channel	Wheel of Fortune	e2	Smallville		The Big Picture			
Citytv	Friends	Access Hollywood	America's Next Top Model		Great Movies			
E!	The Insider	E! News	Kid Nation		Bionic Woman		The Simple Life	Sunset Tan
Radio-Canada	Virginie	L'Épicerie	Le Match des étoiles		Enquête		Le Téléjournal	
TVA	Star Système	La Poule aux oeufs d'or	Destinées		Les Soeurs Elliot		Le TVA 22 heures	
TQS	Loft Story	450, Chemin du Golf	Movie				Le Journal du soir	

=== Thursday ===
PM	7:00	7:30	8:00	8:30	9:00	9:30	10:00	10:30
CBC	Coronation Street	Who Do You Think You Are?	The Nature of Things		Doc Zone		The National	
CTV	eTalk	Jeopardy!	CSI		Grey's Anatomy		ER	
Global	ET Canada	Entertainment Tonight	Survivor: China		The Office	My Name is Earl	Shark	
A-Channel	Wheel of Fortune	e2	Scrubs	30 Rock	Don't Forget the Lyrics!		Big Shots	
Citytv	Friends	Access Hollywood	Ugly Betty		Supernatural		Terminal City	
E!	The Insider	E! News	Are You Smarter Than a 5th Grader?		E! Movies We Love			
Radio-Canada	Virginie	Infoman	Le Moment de vérité		Tous pour un		Le Téléjournal	
TVA	La Fièvre de la danse		Le Banquier		Taxi 0-22		Le TVA 22 heures	
TQS	Loft Story	Criss Angel	Movies				Le Journal du soir	

=== Friday ===
PM	7:00	7:30	8:00	8:30	9:00	9:30	10:00	10:30
CBC	Coronation Street	Canadian Antiques Roadshow	Royal Canadian Air Farce	Rick Mercer Report	Torchwood		The National	
CTV	eTalk	Jeopardy!	Ghost Whisperer		Moonlight		Without a Trace	
Global	ET Canada	Entertainment Tonight	Friday Night Lights		Las Vegas		Numb3rs	
A-Channel	Wheel of Fortune	e2	The Next Great American Band		Don't Forget the Lyrics		The Collector	
Citytv	Friends	Access Hollywood	Men in Trees		Great Movies			
E!	The Insider	E! News	1 vs. 100		Women's Murder Club		20/20	
Radio-Canada	Du Coeur au ventre		L'Heure de gloire		Magazine international		Le Téléjournal	
TVA	JE		Du talent à revendre	Retrouvailles		Juste pour rire	Le TVA 22 heures	
TQS	Loft Story	Faut le voir	La Porte des étoiles		Le Monde de Monsieur Ripley	Sexy Cam	Le Journal du soir	

=== Saturday ===
PM	7:00	7:30	8:00	8:30	9:00	9:30	10:00	10:30
CBC	Hockey Night in Canada							
CTV	W-FIVE		Crimetime Saturday		Whistler		Dramatic Series Encores	
Global	Andromeda		Risk Takers		Painkiller Jane		Global Currents	
A-Channel	Wheel of Fortune	Good to Go	Missing		The Big Picture			
Citytv	Stargate Atlantis		Battlestar Galactica		Great Movies			
E!	E! Live		On E!		Final 24		E! True Hollywood Story	
Radio-Canada	La Fureur	Paquet voleur		Les Pieds dans la marge	Dre. Grey, leçons d'anatomie		Le Téléjournal	
TVA	Movies							
TQS	Loft Story	Movies						

== Top weekly ratings ==
- Note: English Canadian television only by viewers age 2 and up
- "official website". bbm.ca. Archived from the original on January 18, 2010.

Week	Name	Viewers (in millions)	Network
August 27 – September 2	Canadian Idol 5	1.878	CTV
September 3 – September 9	Canadian Idol 5	2.096	CTV
September 10 – September 16	Canadian Idol 5	2.314	CTV
September 17 – September 23	Survivor: China	2.430	Global
September 24 – September 30	House	3.299	Global
October 1 – October 7	House	2.663	Global
October 8 – October 14	House	2.993	Global
October 15 – October 21	Grey's Anatomy	2.792	CTV
October 22 – October 28	CSI: NY	2.461	CTV
October 29 – November 4	House	2.655	Global
November 5 – November 11	House	2.643	Global
November 12 – November 18	House	2.626	Global
November 19 – November 25	95th Grey Cup	2.887	CBC
November 26 – December 2	Dancing with the Stars 5	2.535	CTV
December 3 – December 9	Grey's Anatomy	2.364	CTV
December 10 – December 16	CSI: Crime Scene Investigation	3.137	CTV
December 17 – December 23	CSI: Miami	2.053	CTV
December 24 – December 30	Amazing Race 12	1.618	CTV
December 31 – January 6	Desperate Housewives	2.266	CTV
January 7 – January 13	Criminal Minds	2.288	CTV
January 14 – January 20	American Idol (season 7)	3.036	CTV
January 21 – January 27	American Idol 7	3.006	CTV
January 28 – February 3	NFL Super Bowl XLII	4.234	CTV
February 4 – February 10	American Idol 7	2.698	CTV
February 11 – February 17	American Idol 7	2.645	CTV
February 18 – February 24	80th Academy Awards	4.424	CTV
February 25 – March 2	American Idol 7	2.353	CTV
March 3 – March 9	American Idol 7	2.590	CTV
March 10 – March 16	American Idol 7	2.661	CTV
March 17 – March 23	American Idol 7	2.556	CTV
March 24 – March 30	American Idol 7	2.373	CTV
March 31 – April 6	CSI	3.021	CTV
April 7 – April 13	CSI	2.881	CTV
April 14 – April 20	American Idol 7	2.594	CTV
April 21 – April 27	American Idol 7	2.461	CTV
April 28 – May 4	American Idol 7	2.726	CTV
May 5 – May 11	American Idol 7	2.470	CTV
May 12 – May 18	American Idol 7	2.585	CTV
May 19 – May 25	American Idol 7	3.183	CTV
May 26 – June 1	Stanley Cup Finals	1.979	CBC
June 2 – June 8	Stanley Cup Finals	2.720	CBC
June 9 – June 15	So You Think You Can Dance	1.632	CTV
June 16 – June 22	So You Think You Can Dance	1.521	CTV
June 23 – June 29	So You Think You Can Dance	1.506	CTV
June 30 – July 6	So You Think You Can Dance	1.569	CTV
July 7 – July 13	So You Think You Can Dance	1.327	CTV
July 14 – July 20	So You Think You Can Dance	1.410	CTV
July 21 – July 27	So You Think You Can Dance	1.381	CTV
July 28 – August 3	So You Think You Can Dance	1.462	CTV
August 4 – August 10	So You Think You Can Dance	1.919	CTV
August 11 – August 17	CBC News: The National	1.371	CBC
August 18 – August 24	2008 Summer Olympics closing ceremony	1.486	CBC
