= 2010–11 Canadian network television schedule =

The 2010–11 Canadian network television schedule indicates the fall prime time schedules for Canada's major English and French broadcast networks. For schedule changes after the fall launch, please consult each network's individual article.

Canadian content shows in the tables have a	red	highlight.

== 2011 official spring schedule ==
=== Sunday ===
PM	7:00	7:30	8:00	8:30	9:00	9:30	10:00	10:30
CBC	Heartland		Battle of the Blades		All for One		The National	
CTV	Undercover Boss		The Amazing Race		Desperate Housewives		CSI: Miami	
Global	Ice Pilots NWT		The Simpsons	The Cleveland Show	Family Guy	American Dad!	Brothers & Sisters	
A	TMZ		The Big Picture				Criminal Minds	
Citytv	NFL Football	Mantracker	Extreme Makeover: Home Edition		Murdoch Mysteries		Conviction Kitchen	
Radio-Canada	Découverte	Et Dieu créa Laflaque	Tout le monde en parle				Le Téléjournal	
TVA	Juste Pour Rire		Movies					
V	A contrario		Cinéma					

=== Monday ===
PM	7:00	7:30	8:00	8:30	9:00	9:30	10:00	10:30
CBC	Wheel of Fortune	Jeopardy!	Battle of the Blades	Men with Brooms	Just for Laughs		The National	
CTV	eTalk	The Big Bang Theory	Dancing with the Stars				Castle	
Global	ET Canada	Entertainment Tonight	House		Lone Star		Hawaii Five-0	
A	Corner Gas	Access Hollywood	Law & Order: SVU		Two and a Half Men	Mike & Molly	Criminal Minds	
Citytv	Law & Order: Special Victims Unit		How I Met Your Mother	Rules of Engagement	The Event		Chase	
Radio-Canada	Virginie	Les Parent III	L'Auberge du chien noir		La galère		Le Téléjournal	
TVA	La Classe de 5e		Yamaska		Toute la vérité		Le TVA 22 heures	
V	La Maison de J.Villeneuve	Rire et délire	CSI: NY		Le Mentaliste		Un gars le soir	Dumont

=== Tuesday ===
PM	7:00	7:30	8:00	8:30	9:00	9:30	10:00	10:30
CBC	Wheel of Fortune	Jeopardy!	Rick Mercer Report	This Hour Has 22 Minutes	Being Erica		The National	
CTV	eTalk	The Big Bang Theory	No Ordinary Family		Dancing with the Stars		Law & Order: Special Victims Unit	
Global	ET Canada	Entertainment Tonight	Glee		NCIS: Los Angeles		The Good Wife	
A	Corner Gas	Access Hollywood	The Big Picture (movies)				Criminal Minds	
Citytv	Law & Order: Special Victims Unit		The Biggest Loser				Parenthood	
Radio-Canada	Virginie	La Facture	Providence		Mauvais Karma		Le Téléjournal	
TVA	Les Gags	Occupation Double	House		La promesse		Le TVA 22 heures	
V	La Guerre des clics	Rire et délire	Une femme exemplaire		Lie to me : crimes et mensonges		Un gars le soir	Dumont

=== Wednesday ===
PM	7:00	7:30	8:00	8:30	9:00	9:30	10:00	10:30
CBC	Wheel of Fortune	Jeopardy!	Dragons' Den		The Tudors		The National	
CTV	eTalk	The Big Bang Theory	So You Think You Can Dance Canada		Criminal Minds		Law & Order: Los Angeles	
Global	ET Canada	Entertainment Tonight	Survivor		NCIS		Lie to Me	
A	Corner Gas	Access Hollywood	America's Next Top Model		Hellcats		Criminal Minds	
Citytv	Law & Order: Special Victims Unit		Undercovers		Modern Family	Cougar Town	The Whole Truth	
Radio-Canada	Virginie	L'Épicerie	Le moment de vérité		Les Rescapés		Le Téléjournal	
TVA	Occupation Double	La Poule aux oeufs d'or	Destinées		La Collection		Le TVA 22 heures	
V	450, Chemin du Golf	Rire et délire	unknown		Prozac	Soirée de clowns	Un gars le soir	Dumont

=== Thursday ===
PM	7:00	7:30	8:00	8:30	9:00	9:30	10:00	10:30
CBC	Wheel of Fortune	Jeopardy!	The Nature of Things		Doc Zone		The National	
CTV	CSI: Crime Scene Investigation		The Big Bang Theory	So You Think You Can Dance Canada	Grey's Anatomy		The Mentalist	
Global	ET Canada	Entertainment Tonight	Bones		The Office	Outsourced	Love Bites	
A	Corner Gas	Access Hollywood	The Vampire Diaries		Nikita		Private Practice	
Citytv	Law & Order: Special Victims Unit		Community	30 Rock	Fringe		Law & Order: UK	
Radio-Canada	Virginie	Infoman	Enquête		3600 secondes d'extase		Le Téléjournal	
TVA	La Fièvre de la danse		Fidèle au poste			Juste pour Rire	Le TVA 22 heures	
V	Taxi Payant QC	Rire et délire	NCIS: Los Angeles		Fringe		Un gars le soir	Dumont

=== Friday ===
PM	7:00	7:30	8:00	8:30	9:00	9:30	10:00	10:30
CBC	Wheel of Fortune	Jeopardy!	Marketplace	18 to Life	Just for Laughs Gags		The National	
CTV	eTalk	The Big Bang Theory	Human Target		CSI: NY		Blue Bloods	
Global	ET Canada	Entertainment Tonight	90210		Shattered		Outlaw	
A	Corner Gas	Access Hollywood	Medium		Dateline NBC		Criminal Minds	
Citytv	Law & Order: Special Victims Unit		Hell's Kitchen		Survivorman		Mantracker	
Radio-Canada	Virginie		Paquet voleur		Une heure sur Terre		Le Téléjournal	
TVA	JE		Du talent à revendre		Deux filles le weekend		Le TVA 22 heures	
V	Top Gear		Cinéma				Un gars le soir	Dumont

=== Saturday ===
PM	7:00	7:30	8:00	8:30	9:00	9:30	10:00	10:30
CBC	Hockey Night in Canada							
CTV	W-Five		Crimetime Saturday					
Global	Movies							
A	Road to Avonlea		The Big Picture				Comedy Now!	Comedy Inc.
Citytv	The Most Amazing	What's Cooking	Glenn Martin, DDS	Out There with Melissa DiMarco	Movies			
Radio-Canada	Grands rires 2007		Les enfants de la télé		Dre Grey		Le Téléjournal	
TVA	Movies							
V	Cinéma							

== Top weekly ratings ==
- Note: English Canadian television only by viewers age 2 and up
- Data sources: BBM Canada – 2011 – national – top – program – reports – archive official website

Week	Name	Viewers (in millions)	Network
Aug 30 – Sep 5	Big Brother	1.969	Global
Sep 6–12	Big Brother	1.835	Global
Sep 13–19	Survivor: Nicaragua	2.590	Global
Sep 20–26	The Big Bang Theory	3.112	CTV
Sep 27 – Oct 3	The Big Bang Theory	2.964	CTV
Oct 4–10	The Big Bang Theory	2.692	CTV
Oct 11–17	The Amazing Race	2.989	CTV
Oct 18–24	The Big Bang Theory	3.028	CTV
Oct 25–31	The Big Bang Theory	3.204	CTV
Nov 1–7	The Big Bang Theory	3.408	CTV
Nov 8–14	The Big Bang Theory	3.304	CTV
Nov 15–21	The Big Bang Theory	3.247	CTV
Nov 22–28	98th Grey Cup	4.941	TSN
Nov 29 – Dec 5	The Amazing Race	2.681	CTV
Dec 6–12	The Amazing Race	2.738	CTV
Dec 13–19	The Big Bang Theory	3.021	CTV
Dec 20–26	2011 World Junior Ice Hockey Championships	2.944	TSN
Dec 27 – Jan 2	2011 World Junior Ice Hockey Championships	2.686	TSN
Jan 3–9	2011 World Junior Ice Hockey Championships	5.133	TSN
Jan 10–16	68th Golden Globe Awards	3.308	CTV
Jan 17–23	The Big Bang Theory	3.189	CTV
Jan 24–30	American Idol	3.103	CTV
Jan 31 – Feb 6	Super Bowl XLV	6.537	CTV
Feb 7–13	53rd Grammy Awards	3.258	Global
Feb 14–20	The Big Bang Theory	3.462	CTV
Feb 21–27	83rd Academy Awards	6.113	CTV
Feb 28 – Mar 6	The Amazing Race	2.786	CTV
Mar 7–13	The Big Bang Theory	3.132	CTV
Mar 14–20	American Idol	2.780	CTV
Mar 21–27	American Idol	3.039	CTV
Mar 28 – Apr 3	The Big Bang Theory	3.216	CTV
Apr 4–10	The Big Bang Theory	3.219	CTV
Apr 11–17	The Amazing Race	2.569	CTV
Apr 18–24	American Idol	2.579	CTV
Apr 25 – May 1	2011 Stanley Cup playoffs	3.824	CBC
May 2–8	The Big Bang Theory	3.028	CTV
May 9–15	2011 Stanley Cup playoffs	3.105	CBC
May 16–22	The Big Bang Theory	3.445	CTV
May 23–29	American Idol	3.353	CTV
May 30 – Jun 5	2011 Stanley Cup Finals	5.636	CBC
Jun 6–12	2011 Stanley Cup Finals	5.615	CBC
Jun 13–19	2011 Stanley Cup Finals	7.648	CBC
Jun 20–26	Combat Hospital	1.963	Global
Jun 27 – Jul 3	Combat Hospital	1.550	Global
Jul 4–10	Big Brother	1.787	Global
Jul 11–17	Big Brother	1.837	Global
Jul 18–24	Big Brother	1.723	Global
Jul 25–31	Big Brother	1.719	Global
Aug 1–7	Big Brother	1.661	Global
Aug 8–14	Rookie Blue	1.585	Global
Aug 15–21	Big Brother	1.635	Global
Aug 22–28	The Big Bang Theory	1.717	CTV
