= List of programs broadcast by Noovo =

This is a list of programs currently, formerly, and soon to be broadcast by Noovo. This includes programming that aired under the network's former brands of TQS and V.

== Programs ==
=== 0-9 ===
- 2 laits, un sucre - morning news and talk show hosted by Dominic Paquet, François Maranda and Valérie Simard
- 10-07: L'affaire Zeus - drama
- 450, Chemin du Golf - comedy

=== A ===
- À table avec mon ex! - reality
- Action Réaction - game show
- Agent Carter - drama
- Agents of S.H.I.E.L.D. - drama
- The Amazing Race - reality
- Ambulance animales - reality
- L'Amour est dans le pré
- APB: Alerte d'urgence - drama
- Après OD - reality aftershow
- Elle écrit au meutre - drama
- L'Arbitre - court show
- L'Attaque à 5 - sports news
- Automania
- Aventures en nord

=== B ===
- Le Bachelor - reality
- Bellevue - drama
- Big Brother - reality
- Big Brother Célébrités
- Bleu Nuit - late night softcore porn
- Blindés
- Bob Gratton : Ma Vie, My Life - comedy
- Les Bolés
- Bootcamp: Le parcours extrême
- Box-office

=== C ===
- Cardinal - drama
- Ce soir on char
- Ces chiens qui sauvent des vies
- Chicago Justice - drama
- Chicago Med - drama
- Chicago Police - drama
- Code 111
- Colocs!
- Comme chien et chat
- CSI Miami: Les Experts - drama

=== D ===
- Danser pour gagner
- Défi 21 jours bootcamp
- Destin amoureux
- Dragon Ball Z
- Dumont - news/talk show hosted by Mario Dumont
- Dutrizac - news/talk show

=== E ===
- Les Effaceurs
- Ellen's Game of Games - game show
- En prison
- Entre deux draps - comedy

=== F ===
- La Ferme chez soi
- La Fin du monde est à 7 heures - news satire
- Flashpoint - police drama
- La Fouille
- Futurama - animated

=== G ===
- Gâteaux en folie
- G.O.A.T.
- Gotham
- Le Grand Journal - news
- Grand Rire Bleue
- La Guerre des clans - local adaptation of Family Feud

=== H ===
- Haute sécurité
- Henri pis sa gang - animated
- Huissiers

=== I ===
- Imposteurs

=== J ===
- Je suis chef - cooking competition
- Le Journal du soir - news

=== K ===
- Les Karineries
- Le Killing - comedy

=== L ===
- Lance et compte - drama
- Loft Story - reality
- Lucifer - drama

=== M ===
- Maître du chantier
- Le maître du jeu
- Max et Livia
- Mets-y le Paquet
- Moment décisif
- Moment détente
- Mon ex à moi

=== N ===
- NCIS: Los Angeles - drama
- Ne jamais faire à la maison
- NVL - news

=== O ===
- Occupation Double - reality
- L'Open Mic de...

=== P ===
- Paquet de troubles
- Pas le choix de rénover
- Pas si bête que ça
- Phil s'invite
- Pompiers: La relève
- La Porte des étoiles - science fiction
- Pour toujours, plus un jour - drama
- Pratique Privée - drama
- Le Prochain stand-up - reality competition

=== Q ===
- Quel Talent
- Qu'est-ce qui mijote
- Qui sait chanter? — local adaptation of I Can See Your Voice

=== R ===
- Les Recrues
- Rire et délire - comedy
- Rock et Belles Oreilles - sketch comedy
- RPM
- RPM+

=== S ===
- SEAL Team : Cœur et courage
- La Semaine des 4 Julie - talk show
- Les Simpson - animated
- S.O.S. Beauté
- South Park - animated
- Sports 30
- Supère Mario Monde
- Supergirl
- Sur la route avec Cath Peach

=== T ===
- Taxi payant
- TKO: Total Knock Out
- Tommy - drama
- Tony Speed
- Top Dogs: Homicides
- Tout s'embellit avec Julie - home design
- Transplanté - drama
- Tu m'aimes, tu mens!

=== U ===
- Un souper presque parfait - reality

=== V ===
- Vendeurs de rêve - reality
- Virage - dramatic anthology

=== W ===
- Wipeout Québec - game show

=== X ===
- The X-Files - science fiction

=== Y ===
- Y'a plein d'soleil
