= Téléroman =

French-language television drama series in Canada, similar to a telenovela

A téléroman ("telenovel" or ''annual drama series'') is a genre of French-language drama television series in Canada, similar to a soap opera or a Spanish language telenovela. In France, the téléroman genre is known as feuilleton télévisé (similar to a serial). Téléromans are one of the most popular television series formats in Québécois culture and are also shown on French television.

In Canada, all of the major francophone television networks air téléromans, including the public broadcaster Radio-Canada, which broadcasts them nationally, and the private networks TVA and Noovo. TFO in Ontario has also produced one téléroman.

In France, the TF1 network and the subscription channel Canal+ air feuilletons télévisés. Some famous téléromans produced in France include Riviera, Sous le soleil, Plus belle la vie and Cinq sœurs.

One of the first téléromans on Canadian television was La famille Plouffe. This téléroman proved highly successful, and has helped the genre become a staple on Canadian French television. English Canadian networks have also adapted a number of Québec téléromans for English viewers, including La famille Plouffe, Lance et Compte and Les Hauts et les bas de Sophie Paquin, with varying degrees of success.

== Notable téléromans ==
- Les Belles Histoires des pays d'en haut
- Au nom de la loi
- La Bonne aventure
- Chambres en ville
- Le Cœur a ses raisons (actually a sitcom parodying soaps)
- La famille Plouffe
- Francoeur
- Grand-Papa
- Les Hauts et les bas de Sophie Paquin
- Lance et Compte
- Plus belle la vie
- Providence
- Les Soeurs Elliot
- Terre humaine
- Virginie
