= Julie Snyder =

Canadian talk show host and producer

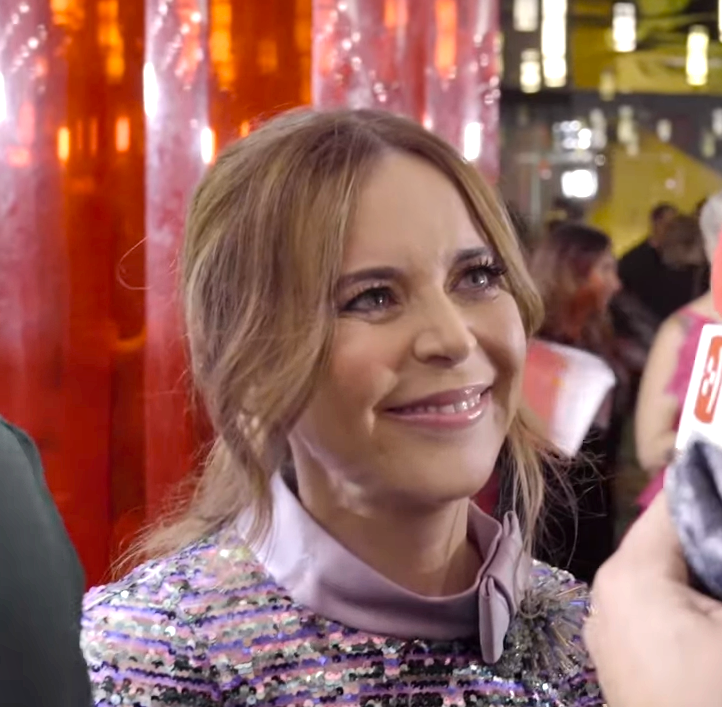
- Julie Snyder on a red carpet in 2019
- Born: Julie Snyder; 6 August 1967 (age 59); Greenfield Park, Quebec, Canada
- Occupations: TV presenter, Game show presenter, producer and actor
- Spouse: Pierre Karl Péladeau (m. 2015; div. 2016)
- Children: 2
- Family: Romy Peladeau

Julie Snyder (born 6 August 1967) is a Francophone Canadian talk show host and producer, appearing as host or guest on various television programs in Canada and France.

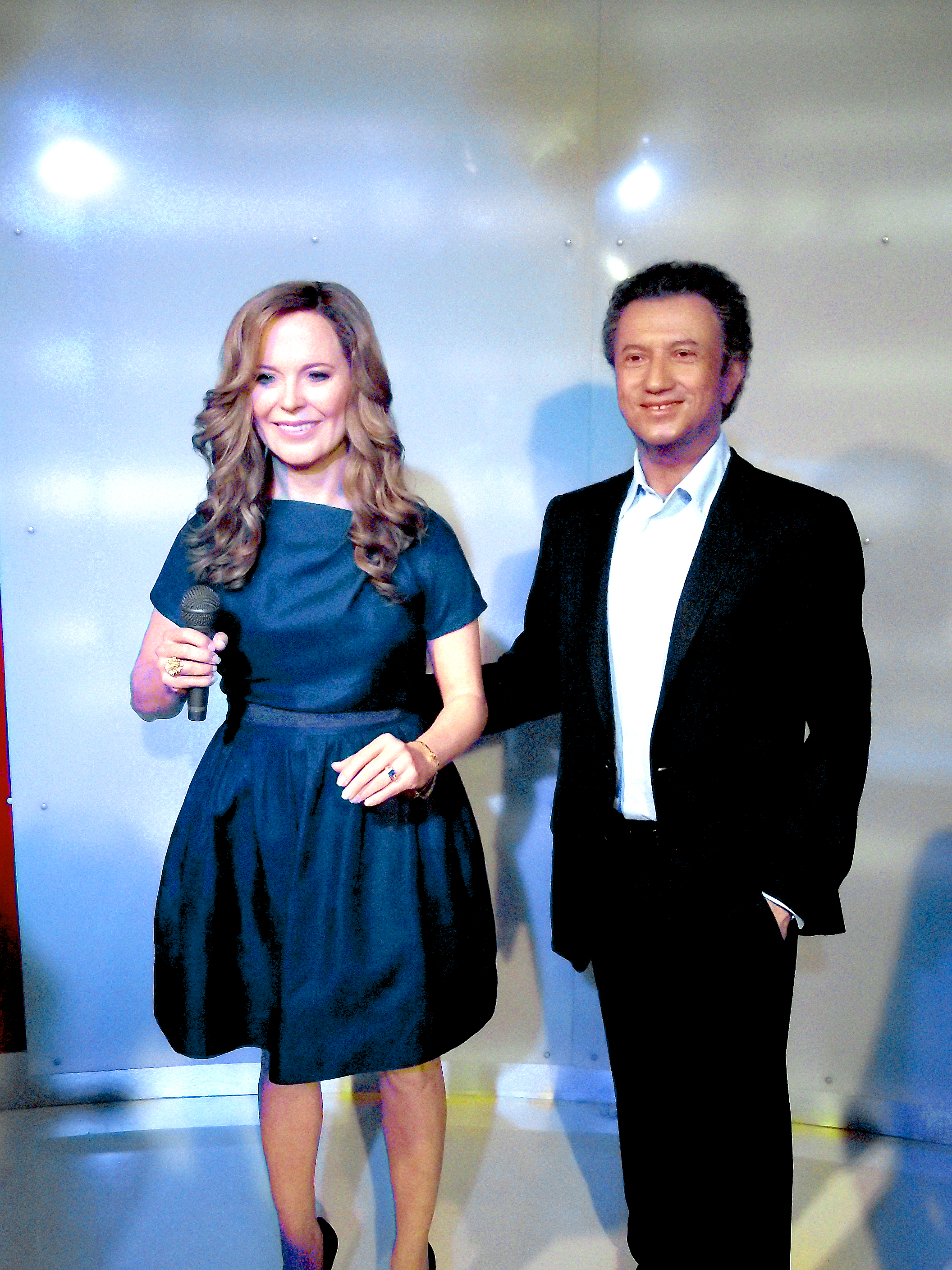
Julie Snyder and Michel Drucker's wax sculptures at Musée Grévin Montreal

She graduated from Collège Jean-de-Brébeuf in 1986.

Snyder is also the CEO of Productions J, a company that she founded in 1997, which produces television shows such as Occupation Double (TVA, 2003–present).

Programs that Snyder participated in include Star Académie, L'enfer c'est nous autres, Sortir, and Le poing J. Snyder made her first television appearance in 1983.

Snyder hosted the French-Canadian adaptation of Deal or No Deal in Canada, Le Banquier, which began 24 January 2007 on the TVA network which became the top-rated television program in Quebec. The show ended on 21 May 2017 after 10 seasons. The show on La semaine des 4 Julie is a variety and talk-show from Noovo.ca.

From 2001 to 2014, Snyder was the common-law wife of Pierre Karl Péladeau, the president and CEO of Quebecor Media, the parent company of TVA. She has two children with Péladeau, Thomas (born May 2005) and Romy (born October 2008). They split in January 2014 and reconciled later that summer. They were married on 15 August 2015 in Quebec City.

They separated again in January 2016, less than five months after their marriage. In July 2016, Snyder revealed that she had been the target of surveillance by a private detective. Later that month, she went to Quebec Superior Court and managed to convince a judge to order the PI firm responsible for the investigation to reveal to her the person who had hired the PI to tail her, information she kept to herself.

In the waning days of the 2012 Quebec election, Snyder hosted a Parti Québécois rally where she heaped praise on the party leader, Pauline Marois. Snyder has also backed the failed Quebec Charter of Values that was tabled by the PQ government.

Snyder's friends and professional advisors include Céline Dion and the late René Angélil.

As of 2017, she is a host on Radio-Canada's ICI Radio network.

Since 2020, she has been the host of La semaine des 4 Julie, a talk show on the online television network Noovo.

Snyder caused controversy on her TV show in January 2022, when she invited an elementary school class to discuss Quebec's COVID-19 restrictions and mandatory vaccination. Asking two young children what should be done about the unvaccinated, the children replied that the police should be called on them. She apologized on social media for the segment. An online petition calling for her show to be cancelled gained over 60,000 signatures.

In January 2023, Snyder, along with other fans of Céline Dion, gathered outside the offices of Rolling Stone to protest Dion's exclusion from the Rolling Stone's The 200 Greatest Singers of All Time list. She noted Dion's prestigious awards and famous performances, and told Rolling Stone reporters that they are "stoned."
