= Yves Trudel =

Canadian actor (1950–2022)

- Trudel in 2011
- Born: 10 February 1950; Quebec, Canada
- Died: 11 March 2022 (aged 72)
- Occupations: Actor, playwright
- Years active: 1985–2018

Yves Trudel (10 February 1950 – 11 March 2022) was a Canadian actor and playwright from Quebec. He was best known for his role of Méo in the Elvis Gratton films, in addition to starring in several films by the director Pierre Falardeau.

Trudel died on 11 March 2022, at the age of 72.

== Filmography ==
- Elvis Gratton : Le King des kings (1985) as Meo
- The Party (1990) as Waso
- Ding et Dong (1990) as Construction worker
- Lance et compte : Le Retour du chat (1991, TV film)
- Octobre (1994) as Ti-Casse
- Elvis Gratton II : Miracle à Memphis (1999) as Méo
- 15 février 1839 (2001) as Joseph
- Comment ma mère accoucha de moi durant sa ménopause (2003) as an Itinerant
- 20h17 rue Darling (2003) as Officer
- Elvis Gratton XXX : La Vengeance d'Elvis Wong (2004) as Méo
- Bob Gratton : Ma vie, My Life (2007–2009) as Méo
- Curling (2010) as Yvan
