= Marie-Maude Denis =

Canadian journalist

- Born: Sudbury, Ontario
- Occupation: investigative journalist
- Years active: 2002–present
- Organization: CBC/Radio-Canada
- Known for: Host Enquête

Marie-Maude Denis (born in Sudbury, Ontario) is an investigative journalist and host working for CBC/Radio-Canada in Montreal. Since 2008, she has been working on the public affairs program Enquête, and in September 2015 she is the successor to Alain Gravel.

== Biography ==
A student in political science, communications and theatre at the University of Ottawa, then in journalism at Université Laval, Marie-Maude Denis began her career on the Radio-Canada radio station where she was a columnist, then landed a job to the news agency Broadcast News, a subsidiary of The Canadian Press. In 2002, she was recruited at the CBC newsroom in Quebec City, first as a subtitles attendant, then as a court cases. In 2007, she succeeded journalist Alexandre Dumas in news on Radio-Canada.

In 2008, a source gave her confidential information about corruption in the construction sector and documents relating to several people who gravitated around the City of Laval, including businessman Tony Accurso and the Mayor of the City of Laval. time, Gilles Vaillancourt. A colleague advised Marie-Maude Denis to hand over the envelope to a researcher on the Enquête program, who had observed irregularities in the Ville de Laval since 1998. She then joined the Investigation team and her colleagues. She is pursuing dangerous research that will lead to a series of television reports, a police investigation, the Charbonneau Commission and the book Dans les coulisses d'Enquête. In 2010, she received the Judith-Jasmine Grand Prix for the "Collusion frontale" report and the Judith-Jasmine Award in the Investigation category for the "Anguille sous roche" report. She has hosted the program Enquête since September 2015, succeeding Alain Gravel.

In 2019, she defended Blaise Ndala's novel Sans capote ni kalachnikov on Le Combat des livres. The novel won the competition.

Marie-Maude Denis is the daughter of Radio-Canada Ottawa director Michel Denis.

== Awards and distinctions ==
- 2010 : Grand prix Judith-Jasmin pour le reportage « Collusion frontale »
- 2012 : prix Judith-Jasmin, catégorie Enquête pour le reportage « Anguille sous roche »
- 2015 : Médaille Raymond-Blais
- 2017 : prix Judith-Jasmin, catégorie Enquête pour le reportage « Les baux cadeaux »
