= Deal or No Deal Canada =

Canadian television game show

- Deal or No Deal Canada logo
- Genre: Game show
- Based on: Deal or No Deal by John de Mol Jr.
- Starring: Howie Mandel; Rick Campanelli (Canada's Case Game); Peter Abbay (The Banker)
- Country of origin: Canada
- Original language: English
- No. of episodes: 5

Production
- Executive producers: Scott St. John; John Brunton; Barbara Bowlby
- Running time: 60 minutes
- Production company: Insight Productions

Original release
- Network: Global
- Release: February 4 – March 1, 2007

Deal or No Deal Canada is the Canadian English-language version of the show Deal or No Deal, which premiered on February 4, 2007. The show ran on the Global Television Network and lasted five episodes.

The host of the American version, Canadian-born Howie Mandel, hosts the Canadian version of the show. The producer and director of the United States version, Scott St. John and R. Brian DiPirro, respectively, also went to Canada to produce this version.

The show was taped at the Canadian Broadcasting Centre in Toronto on January 23, 24, and 25, 2007, after receiving 112,767 applications from prospective players.

The first episode aired on Sunday, February 4, 2007. This episode attracted 2.7 million viewers, making it the single highest-rated Canadian program ever on Global. The remaining episodes aired over the following four consecutive Thursdays, with the finale on March 1, 2007.

Despite the show's success in its brief five-episode run, Global never picked up the show for a full-season run.

== Case values ==
The amounts remain the same as the American edition, except for the re-labeling of the $1 value using the common nickname "Loonie", the addition of a "Toonie", the $2 case, and the removal of the $400,000 value. All amounts are in Canadian dollars, tax-free.

Left Side	Right Side
$0.01	$750
LOONIE	$1,000
TOONIE	$5,000
$5	$10,000
$10	$25,000
$25	$50,000
$50	$75,000
$75	$100,000
$100	$200,000
$200	$300,000
$300	$500,000
$400	$750,000
$500	$1,000,000

== Canada's Case Game ==
Presented by ET Canada correspondent Rick Campanelli, Canada's Case Game is modeled after the American Lucky Case Game. During commercials, five cases are displayed by a selection of the models. Viewers are invited to choose a case by texting the Deal or No Deal number (at a cost of $1 per message) or entering the Global TV website, with the winning case displayed at the end of the program. All those who selected the winning case were entered in the draw for a grand prize.

However, the prize in the Case Game is not cash; prizes that were offered included a Pontiac G6 convertible (in connection with Pontiac's sponsorship of the show) and trips for 12 from Sunquest Vacations.

In the first episode, entry volume was so high that the contest had to be extended one hour.

Winners of Canada's Case Game are revealed the following evening on ET Canada.

== Sponsors and cross-placement ==
In addition to Pontiac, Rogers is also a main sponsor of Deal or No Deal Canada. The red-coloured telephone on the show is product placement for Rogers.

== See also ==
- Le Banquier
