= Éric Salvail =

Canadian entertainer

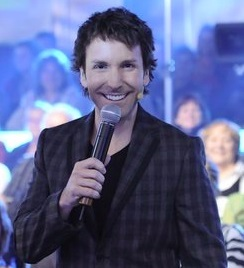
- Salvail in 2012
- Born: June 26, 1969 (age 57); Sorel-Tracy, Quebec, Canada
- Education: Université du Québec à Montréal
- Occupations: Radio and television personality; producer; businessman
- Years active: 1996–2017

Éric Salvail (born June 26, 1969) is a Canadian former radio and television personality, producer and host in Quebec. In 2014, he founded "Salvail & Co. Productions".

== Career ==
Salvail was born in Sorel-Tracy to André Salvail and Colette Paul. The family ran a small convenience store in Sorel-Tracy named Chez Salvail. His father died of Alzheimer's disease in 2006. Salvail studied communications at Université du Québec à Montréal (UQAM).

He started working in 1991 at CJSO 101.7, a local radio station in Sorel. He went on to be a staff member in a number of TV shows on Radio-Canada like Moi et l'autre, Chabada, Le Poing J and La Petite Vie. In 1999, he co-hosted shows like Occupation Double on TVA before landing as host in Star Académie in 2003 also on TVA.

In 2007, he produced and presented Dieu merci! an adaptation of the Australian show Thank God You're Here, in addition to the show Salvail et Racicot on NRJ 94.3 NRJ and later Le retour de Salvail, Dominic et Martin.

Between 2010 and 2013, he produced and hosted Fidèles au poste!, a TV game show on TVA. In 2013, he moved to channel V for hosting the talk show En mode Salvail in 2013 and Ce soir tout est permis in 2014 and Les Recettes Pompettes in 2015. Since August 2015, he returned to radio through the radio Énergie (earlier NRJ) show Éric et les fantastiques from Mondays to Fridays.

Founding the production house Salvail & Co. Productions in 2014, he produced shows and documentaries for various media outlets like VRAK and Canal Vie and notably in 2016 Lip Sync Battle: face à face an adaptation of an American show Lip Sync Battle.

== Sexual misconduct allegations scandal ==
In 2017, 11 people divulged allegations of sexual misconduct against Salvail in an article published in the Montreal daily La Presse. The alleged conduct spanned a 15-year period. Salvail sold most of his business concerns as a result, including his company on 24 October 2017, with many media outlets associated with his productions discontinuing his shows.
