= MTV e2 =

MTV e2's second logo

MTV e2 is a Canadian entertainment news program that aired on MTV and A; hosted by Anna Cyzon; produced at the Masonic Temple in downtown Toronto.

The show was discontinued on July 16, 2008.
