= Mansbridge One on One =

Former CBC TV Program

Mansbridge One on One is a weekly TV program on CBC Television featuring CBC's News' chief correspondent Peter Mansbridge who is a 12-time Gemini Award recipient and officer of the Order of Canada. The program began airing in 1999, and had featured interviews with the likes of Hillary Clinton.

The show ended once Peter Mansbridge retired from the CBC in 2017.
