= Les Sœurs Elliot =

Les Sœurs Elliot (The Elliot Sisters) is a Canadian television drama series, which aired on TVA in the 2007–08 season.

The series featured Sylvie Léonard, Isabel Richer and Julie Perreault as three sisters whose lives are thrown into turmoil when their father returns from Angola after disappearing thirty years earlier.
