= Dumont (TV program) =

Dumont is a Canadian news television program, which launched in fall 2009 on V, and ran through 2012. Airing weekdays at 5 p.m. with the title Dumont 360 in its first season, the program moved to 10:30 p.m. and adopted the Dumont title in fall 2010, after the network cancelled its sports talk series L'Attaque à 5.

Hosted by Mario Dumont, a former politician, the show was a news and interview series. The series was produced by La Presse Télé, the television production arm of Montreal newspaper La Presse. It ended its run on V in 2012, after Dumont left the network to join LCN, although Dumont remains the title of his LCN series as of 2016.
