= L'Attaque à 5 =

L'Attaque à 5 is a Canadian sports television series, which aired weeknights at 10:00 p.m. on V.

Hosted by Jean Pagé, with Evelyne Audet, the series airs sports news and discussion. The series previously aired with the title 110%, adopting its present title concurrently with the network's rebranding from TQS to V in August 2009.

On May 14, 2010, Tony Marinaro of Team 990 announced that V would not be renewing their contract with the show and their last episode would be aired sometime in late May. The program's time slot was taken over by the news series Dumont in fall 2010.
