= TMZ on TV =

American syndicated entertainment and gossip news television show, 2007–present

- Created by: Harvey Levin; Jim Paratore
- Starring: Harvey Levin (for information on other TMZ staffers appearing on the program, see On-air cast)
- Theme music composer: Jason Brandt
- Composers: Michael A. Muhammad; Michael Egizi
- Country of origin: United States
- Original language: English
- No. of seasons: 14

Production
- Executive producers: Harvey Levin (2007–2025); Jim Paratore (2007–2012); Charles Latibeaudiere (2013–present); Evan Rosenblum (2013–present); Stuart Alpert (2014–present)
- Camera setup: Multi-camera
- Running time: 22 minutes
- Production companies: TMZ.com; TMZ Inc. Harvey Levin Productions; Paramedia; Telepictures Productions (2007–2021); Warner Bros. Television (2007–2021); Fox Alternative Entertainment (2021–present)

Original release
- Network: Syndication
- Release: September 10, 2007 – present

Related
- TMZ Live

TMZ on TV (also known as TMZ on Fox and simply as TMZ or TMZTV) is an American syndicated entertainment and gossip news television show that premiered on September 10, 2007 (its major carriage is among television stations owned by current series owner Fox). It is essentially a televised version of its sister operation, TMZ, a news website which has a heavy emphasis on gossip about celebrities' personal lives, and which debuted in December 2005.

The television program is produced at studio facilities that serve as the headquarters for the parent website. “TMZ” is an insider term standing for "thirty-mile zone" (also known as the studio zone), which refers to the film studio area of downtown Hollywood.

In November 2019, Fox Television Stations renewed its commitment to TMZ on TV through the 2022–23 season.

== Format ==
TMZ on TV is broadcast in two formats: the weekday edition is broadcast as a half-hour program; a one-hour weekend edition, composed of select stories featured in each of the weekday editions from the previous week, is also produced; during major holidays occurring on a weekday, that episode may feature a format similar to the weekend edition but featuring a compilation of stories from past editions centered around a particular theme (for example, a Christmas episode may center on celebrities who have been bad or good in the past year).

Unlike most entertainment news programs, TMZ on TV does not use a format of anchors in a studio delivering the stories and correspondents reporting on many of the stories in each edition; instead, most story packages are delivered via an announcer, and "in-studio" segments are taped during a morning staff pitch meeting at TMZ's Jefferson Boulevard headquarters, with some TMZ staffers delivering story pieces themselves.

The series delivers most of its stories in a humorous manner, mainly about certain celebrities, and features tongue-in-cheek jokes and double entendres, although more serious entertainment stories (such as a breaking entertainment story or celebrity death) – which appear on the program sparingly – often warrant a serious tone. Pieces often feature archived clips from television series and movies often for comedic effect, although they may sometimes be used to reference a project in which an entertainer is known for performing. Many pieces are shown in the "man on the street"-type question and answer format synonymous with paparazzi, although some celebrities do not answer certain questions asked to them by the videographer; a common recurring theme within the program is how certain TMZ videographers sometimes ask their subject extremely trivial or bad questions.

In lieu of regular daily segments such as a rumor mill segment, the program often shows recurring segments that appear over several episodes that feature a humorous or satirical introduction (for example, after the Tiger Woods adultery scandal broke in November 2009, all stories involving Woods began with the introduction: "TNN: The Tiger News Network", using a logo and name parodying that of cable television channel CNN, a then-sister channel to TMZ.com and the then-distributors of the television series, Warner Bros. Television and Telepictures, all owned by Time Warner). For the first few weeks of the show's run, the series carried a daily segment called "Full Frontal Fashion", featuring celebrity fashion blunders, but it was dropped after roughly one month.

== On-air cast ==
- Harvey Levin – executive producer
- Adam Glyn – comedian, camera guy from NYC
- Charles Latibeaudiere – co-executive producer

=== Notable former cast members ===
- Ben Mankiewicz – former co-host of the Air America/XM radio/YouTube online show The Young Turks; currently hosts weekend daytime film presentations on Turner Classic Movies, as well as the co-host of TYT Network's weekly program TYT Old School.
- Deborah D Greene from Tampa FL currently works in life insurance and hosts a YouTube channel about cats
- Teresa Strasser – comedian; co-host of The Adam Carolla Show
- Countess Marina von Bismarck – comedian, celerbityologist on VH1, Logo Gossip Queens, under Mike Dinow
- Anthony Scaramucci – was a guest host for one episode after his dismissal as White House Press Secretary

== Criticism ==
TMZ was criticized for purchasing stolen items pertaining to the fourth Indiana Jones film. On October 2, 2007, IESB reported that a number of production photos and sensitive documents pertaining to the production budget had been stolen from Steven Spielberg's production office.

According to IESB, TMZ.com obtained some of the stolen property and was on the verge of running the story on the TV show until Paramount lawyers stepped in. After IESB broke the story, TMZ on TV broadcast details about the Indiana Jones production budget on the October 3, 2007, program.

== Parodies ==
- On August 26, 2009, 3rd Degree Films released a pornographic parody film based on TMZ called TM Sleaze, featuring Ron Jeremy, Lisa Ann, Tori Black, and Faye Reagan.
- Originating in 2009 on the short-lived NBC primetime talk show The Jay Leno Show and used from 2010 to 2014 on The Tonight Show with Jay Leno, comedian Mikey Day performs a sketch called "JMZ"; in it, Day and his "camera crew" track down celebrities (some actual celebrities appear in the sketch, while impersonators whose faces are not shown are shown sometimes in the sketch), which end up with Day involved in strange situations.
- "Weird Al" Yankovic wrote a song in 2011, "TMZ", about the website and TV show on his album Alpocalypse.
- A 2016 episode of Inside Amy Schumer titled "Madame President" opens with a parody of TMZ called "AMZ".
- A Progressive Insurance commercial did a parody of the show called "Look! Famous People!" in which the photographers all take pictures of spokeswoman Flo doing her grocery shopping, then catch her in a car with a man whom they assume to be her new boyfriend; he is instead a potential customer.

== International broadcast history ==
In Canada, TMZ is shown on E!. In Australia it was broadcast on cable/satellite channel Arena until October 2008. It began broadcasting on the digital-only free-to-air channel GO! on August 9, 2009. The show was taken off the air in September 2015 to make way for expansions for children's content.

In the Philippines, Jack TV aired the show until the network's closure in April 2020.
