= Elvis Gratton =

Québecois fictional character

Bob 'Elvis' Gratton was a fictional character, the subject of multiple films and a television series of the same name by Quebec director Pierre Falardeau: a series of short films (Elvis Gratton, 1981; Les Vacances d'Elvis Gratton, 1983; Pas encore Elvis Gratton!, 1985) released on VHS as the single 1985 film Elvis Gratton: Le king des kings, and then two sequels: Elvis Gratton II: Miracle à Memphis (1999) and Elvis Gratton 3: La vengeance d'Elvis Wong (2004). Most recently, a television series entitled Bob Gratton: Ma Vie/My Life began on January 15, 2007, and finished its third and final season in 2009.

== Plot ==
The first film revolves around one Bob Gratton (played by Julien Poulin, who co-wrote and co-directed the films with Falardeau) and his passion for Elvis Presley. Gratton's life goal was to win fame as an Elvis impersonator, and he achieves it through a local TV talent show contest whose prize is a cruise to the fictional island resort of Santa Banana. After his return from Santa Banana, Gratton is called on to don his Elvis costume one more time, but because he has gained weight in the interim, he has trouble fitting into it and collapses on stage during a performance, seemingly dead. In the film's final scene, just as Gratton's casket is taken for interment, Bob emerges from it, quite alive.

The second film revolves around Gratton's later adventures after being discovered by a talent scout, and his rise to fame as a pop music star.

The third installment sees Gratton become the head of a media company and play an active role in manipulating the news that his media empire puts out.

== Political context ==
In the 1980s, Falardeau and Poulin were very clear as to the goal of the early short films which constituted the first instalment of Elvis Gratton: the intent was to portray (via parody) Falardeau's and Poulin's view of the mindset that they believed had driven a majority of Québécois to vote for the "No" side of the 1980 referendum on Quebec sovereignty. Gratton is portrayed as fat and uneducated, but also conservative, pro-American, racist and federalist. The films' comical situations are premised on Gratton's tacky (quétaine) character and backward-thinking views, with which Falardeau and Poulin sought to associate Quebec federalists more generally. Years later, Falardeau would reveal that he regretted the movie's focus on slapstick comedy and the protagonist's constant comic relief which, in his eyes, removed the underlying message of the movie and made the movie popular only for its jokes. The fact that Gratton is a local entrepreneur who employs a few workers but has other goals in life such as becoming globally famous (despite lack of talent) and, most importantly, being loved by everyone, reflects Falardeau's impression of Quebec federalists. For example, in the second movie the character accepts all offers and signs all contracts proffered (without even bothering to read them) with hopes of realizing these goals, even if at the risk of personal bankruptcy. The need to be loved by others is part and parcel of Falardeau's view of Quebec federalists.

Falardeau's motivation to create a second Elvis Gratton movie traces its roots back to the early 1990s when he sought financing for his February 15, 1839 (15 février 1839) film project portraying aspects of the Lower Canada Rebellion. Since this film was about Quebec history Falardeau had been soliciting donations for some time, until it was suggested that a new Elvis Gratton movie would most likely be a hit and garner sufficient funds. This did indeed prove fruitful, and 15 février 1839 was released in 2001.

== Cast ==
Character	Film			
Character	Le King des Kings	Miracle à Memphis	La Vengeance d'Elvis Wong	Ma Vie, my Life (TV Series)
Bob "Elvis" Gratton	Julien Poulin	Julien Poulin	Julien Poulin	Julien Poulin
Méo	Yves Trudel	Yves Trudel	Yves Trudel	Yves Trudel
Linda Gratton	Denise Mercier			Denise Mercier
Lucien	Benoît Paiement			
Donald Bill Clinton		Barry Blake		
Agathe Pichette		Michelle Sirois		
Lisianne Gagnon		Anne-Marie Provencher		
Directeur de l'information			Jacques Allard	
Elvis Wong			Pedro Miguel Arce	
Steven				Pierre-Paul Alain
Mike				Dave Richer
Rodger Gratton				Vincent Bilodeau

== Other appearances ==
Elvis Gratton showed up (remarkably un-politicised) in 1996 in an ad campaign as the year's spokesman for Opération Nez rouge (Operation Red Nose), a local initiative in Québec to provide a free driving service to take party-goers' cars back home during the holidays (along with said party-goers). Opération Nez Rouge has a history of using different humorists and/or characters each year to promote its activities.
