= Enquête =

Canadian television show

Enquête (lit. "Inquest" or "Inquiry") is a Canadian French-language television newsmagazine series, which airs weekly on Ici Radio-Canada Télé and Ici RDI. The show is anchored by Marie-Maude Denis, and includes contributions from journalists Hélène Courchesne, Josée Dupuis, Sylvie Fournier, Guy Gendron, Normand Grondin, Solveig Miller, Madeleine Roy, Françoise Stanton, Pascale Turbide and Julie Vaillancourt.

== Significance ==
An episode centered on businessman Tony Accurso led to a series of events which resulted in a public inquiry commission on construction of public works.

In 2016, the program won the Michener Award for public service journalism for "Abus de la SQ: les femmes brisent le silence", its 2015 investigation into ongoing physical and sexual abuse of indigenous women in Val-d'Or, Quebec.

== Programs aired ==
- PROFUNC

== See also ==
- The Fifth Estate, the English-language counterpart produced by CBC News
