= Et Dieu créa... Laflaque =

Et Dieu créa... Laflaque (later Ici Laflaque) was a satirical show on Quebec television that commented on current events through its main character, Gérard D. Laflaque, a stereotypical family father. According to Stéphan Bureau, the show is characterized as a major source of vicarious embarrassment for the younger generation. Created by the cartoonist Serge Chapleau, it was broadcast on a weekly basis between 2004 and 2019 by Télévision de Radio-Canada. Its original title translates to "And God Created... Laflaque" (a satirical reference to the Brigitte Bardot film Et Dieu créa... la femme), and its renamed title of Ici Laflaque ("This Is Laflaque") is a play on the classic announcement "Ici Radio-Canada."

== Concept ==
Gérard D. Laflaque made his television debut in the early 1980s as a latex puppet, but was eventually created using CGI animation. His name was inspired by former minister and acting leader of the Quebec Liberal Party Gérard D. Levesque. The program follows two storylines. The first involves Laflaque's family life with his wife Georgette, his son Marcel and Marcel's Asian girlfriend Laurence, his insufferable father Pépère, his dog Tarzan and his next-door neighbour, a gay inventor named Edmond. A caricature of reporter Louise Cousineau joined the cast as a recurring character who owns a corner store. As part of the second storyline, Laflaque picked apart the news of the day with no holds barred on a current-affairs show accompanied by his cameramen Roger and Henri (later replaced by a man who is part of numerous religions), his producer Paulo, the lovely Sarah-Laurie Joly and the puppet Ti-Bas. A later arrival was a caricature of the intellectual Denise Bombardier.

Laflaque regularly welcomed all kinds of guests, mostly caricatures of politicians including Paul Martin, Jean Charest, Stephen Harper, Gilles Duceppe, Jacques Parizeau, André Boisclair, George W. Bush, Guy Bertrand, Mario Dumont, Pauline Marois, Stéphane Dion, Michael Ignatieff, Jack Layton, Nicolas Sarkozy, Régis Labeaume and Denis Coderre. Journalist Christopher Hall made regular appearances to deliver reports and ask ridiculous questions to people in the streets until the end of Season 3.

Sometimes, segments unrelated to the news appeared in the "current affairs" part of the show, such as a cooking segment, the "Petit Laflaque Illustre," which explains an everyday object in a ridiculous way and "Stade Trek," a Star Trek parody featuring the former political leaders cruising around the galaxy in Montreal's Olympic Stadium.
