= Découverte =

- Genre: Science magazine
- Presented by: Charles Tisseyre
- Country of origin: Canada
- Original language: French

Original release
- Network: SRC
- Release: September 11, 1988

Découverte (English: Discovery) is a French language Canadian television series which airs on SRC and is hosted by Charles Tisseyre. The series airs news and documentary features relating to science and technology.

== History ==
In 1975, SRC initiated a fresh approach to scientific broadcasting with the introduction of Science-Réalité!, hosted by Joël Le Bigot. The program, spanning 13 years, struggled to captivate a substantial audience, consistently falling short of 300,000 viewers.

In 1988, a significant departure in both journalistic style and technical presentation was undertaken with the launch of Découverte. Journalist Pierre Sormany led the initiative to craft this new program, which featured segments lasting 23 minutes and encompassing 3 to 4 topics. Unlike its predecessors, Découverte was presented by Pierre Maisonneuve on location rather than from a studio. Emphasizing visually engaging content and targeting family audiences, the show integrated extensive infographics and occasionally aired reports produced overseas to accommodate budgetary constraints. Despite the absence of a conventional promotional campaign, the debut season garnered 370,000 viewers.

By 1990, owing to its favorable reception, Découverte was expanded to a 45-minute format, attracting 398,000 viewers that year and 500,000 by 1992.

In 1992, Charles Tisseyre assumed hosting duties, and the program expanded to a one-hour slot (Sundays at 6:30 p.m.), achieving an audience of 662,000 viewers by 1994. However, heightened competition from rival network TVA led to a decline in viewership. Nonetheless, the show achieved a record audience of 663,000 viewers during the 1999/2000 season. Subsequently, during the early 2010s, it enjoyed viewership of approximately 750,000 in its primary time slot and nearly one million weekly viewers, including reruns on the cable channels RDI and Explora.

In 2008, host Charles Tisseyre and director Hélène Leroux embarked on an expedition to Mount Mera in the Himalayas. Under expert supervision, they aimed to demonstrate the potential for sedentary individuals to enhance their health and fitness through accessible means, showcasing the journey as part of the program's commitment to engaging and educational content.
