= Virginie =

Canadian television series

- Written by: Fabienne Larouche
- Starring: Chantal Fontaine (1996–2008); Stéphanie Crête-Blais (2007–2010)
- Country of origin: Canada
- Original language: French
- No. of seasons: 15
- No. of episodes: 1,740

Production
- Production location: Montreal
- Running time: 30 minutes
- Production company: Aetios Productions

Original release
- Network: Radio-Canada
- Release: September 16, 1996 – December 16, 2010

Virginie is a French-language Canadian television series that aired Monday through Thursday on Radio-Canada (the French-language CBC television network). It debuted in 1996. The show examined the public and private lives of teachers, students, and families at the fictional Sainte-Jeanne-d'Arc high school. It frequently dealt with controversial social topics, such as teen drug use, ethnic prejudice, divorce, and other subjects touching on contemporary Quebec life. "Virginie" was a téléroman-style drama that often used "cliffhangers" in the storylines. It aired 120 episodes per year of 30 minutes each.

The series was produced and largely written by Fabienne Larouche. Virginie ended in December 2010 after 15 years on air; the last episode aired on December 15, 2010. The final episode drew more than 807,000 viewers in Quebec, or about 200,000 more than its average viewership for a typical episode. The program maintained a high level of popularity throughout its television run.

== Current main characters ==
- Virginie Charest (Stéphanie Crête-Blais, 2007–2010) is a physical education teacher at the school.
- Frédéric Perreault (Maxime Denommée), boyfriend of Virginie Charest, is a member of the Canadian Army's Royal 22^{e} Régiment and currently based in Afghanistan. The 2009 season finale cliffhanger suggested that the character died on duty.
- Stéphane Lessieur (Peter Miller), former boyfriend of Virginie Boivin and father of her two children. He is currently a police officer with the Sûreté du Québec. He dated the sexologist of the school, Véronique. He is now dating Virginie Charest
- Bernard Paré (Jean L'Italien)
- Pierre Lacaille (JiCi Lauzon)
- Hercule Bellehumeur (Martin Larocque) He is an overweight gym teacher. He is dating Agathe, who is also a gym teacher. Hercule is always on a diet...but loves food and eating too much to resist!
- Péneloppe Belhumeur (Sonia Vachon) She was a teacher at Ste-Jeanne D'arc. She is the sister of Hercule Belhummeur, the gym teacher. She used to date Lacaille, and had a child with him.
- Hugo Lacasse (played by Patrice Bissonnette before the 2002 season, then by Fabien Dupuis)
- Michel Rivest (Marcel Leboeuf)
- Ghislaine Cormier (Louise Deschâtelets)
- Monique Rivest (Annick Bergeron)
- René Ouellet (Michel Forget)
- * Bobby Rajotte (Hubert Proulx)
- Pierre-Paul Laporte (Benoit Langlais)

== Other current characters ==
- “Toutoune” Laporte (Eric Hoziel)
- Cathie Laurendeau (Joëlle Morin)
- Juge Pringle (Réjean Lefrançois)
- Agathe Sirois (Geneviève Néron)
- Sylvain Lajoie (Cédric Pépin)
- Véronique Gagnon (Christine Beaulieu)

== Past characters ==
- Virginie Boivin (Chantal Fontaine, 1996–2008) was the main character until 2008 when she left the series. She was a physical education teacher at the school, who left to live in Saguenay-Lac-Saint-Jean with her two young children.
- Maurice Ladouceur (Jean-François Mercier) Maurice was killed by a drunk driver.
- Louise Pouliot (Pascale Desrochers) Louise left after giving birth to her child.
- Patrick Labbé as Gary Lamothe
- Monique Chabot as Cécile Boivin
- Claude Blanchard as Pierre Boivin
- Anne Dorval as Lucie Chabot
- Jean-François Pichette as Daniel Charron
- Marie-Joanne Boucher as Claudie Paré
- Julie Vincent as Dominique Latreille
- Frédéric Angers as Guillaume Tremblay
- Michel Daigle as Édouard Lirette
- Katerine Mousseau as Mireille Langlois
- Jacques L'Heureux as Julien Constantin
- Nathalie Gascon as Andrée Constantin*
- Véronique Bannon as Karine Constantin
- Patrice Godin as Marc Dubuc
- Pauline Martin as Suzanne Simoneau
- Bernard Fortin as Marc Dupras
- Muriel Dutil as Lise Bombardier
- Frédéric Pierre as Sylvestre Paul
- Alexandra Laverdière as Julie Constantin
- Marie-Josée Normand as Marilyn Potvin
- Fanny Lauzier as Véronique Bernier
- Jean Petitclerc as Michel Francoeur
- Denyse Chartier as Carmen Paré
- Yvan Ponton as Luc Paré
- Denis Bernard as Roger Tremblay
- Laurence Leboeuf as Évelyne Boivin
- Roxanne Gaudette-Loiseau as Pénélope Chabot-Charron
- Omar Sharif Jr. as Oliver Briscbois
- Béatrice Picard as Alice
- Cleo Tellier as Émilie
- Dominique Lévesque as Henri-Paul Dutrisac
- Maxim Roy as Marie-Claude Roy
- Pierre Curzi as Gilles Bazinet
- Robert Gravel as Gilles Bazinet
- Lucie Laurier as Karine Constantin
- Antoine Bertrand as Patrick Betrand
- Tony Conte as Pietro Curvo
- André Ducharme as Alain Gauthier
- Maxim Gaudette as Éric Pouliot
- Martin Gendron as Stéphane Pouliot
- Myriam Houle as Kim Dubé
- Nicole Leblanc as Yolande Lacaille
- Pierre Legris as Robert Bourdages
- Danièle Lorain as Sœur Jacinthe Lacroix
- Linda Malo as Sophie Lapierre
- Isabelle Maréchal as Andréanne Rocheleau
- Lise Martin as Sœur Rose-Marie
- Dominique Michel as Geneviève Leblanc
- Louis-David Morasse as Simon Laberge
- Iannicko N'Doua-Légaré as Claude Armand
- Patricia Nolin as Marie Lalonde
- Eric Paulhus as Guy Landry
- Julien Poulin as Jean-Louis Beaudry
- Adèle Reinhardt as Normande Legault
- Cleo Tellier as Élève principale
- Geneviève Rochette as Maria-Isabella Ortiz
- Martin Rouette as Videk Striknër
- Jason Roy Léveillée as Steve Ferron
- Isabelle Sénécal-Lapointe as Léa-Marie Clément
- Caroline Tanguay as Annie Legault
- Lily Thibeault as Josiane Despaties
- Daniel Thomas as Philippe Gagné
- Johanne-Marie Tremblay as Ginette Boivin
- Sonia Vachon as Pénélope Belhumeur
- Rosie Yale as Lily Péloquin
