= Le Banquier =

- "Le Banquier" logo, similar to the US Deal or No Deal logo
- Created by: John de Mol
- Starring: Julie Snyder
- Country of origin: Canada
- Original language: French

Production
- Executive producer: Daniel Rancourt
- Running time: About 1 hour (sometimes more)

Original release
- Network: TVA
- Release: January 24, 2007 – May 21, 2017

Le Banquier (English: The Banker) was a Canadian game show and the Quebec adaptation of the international game show Deal or No Deal. It debuted on January 24, 2007 at 9 pm on the TVA network. The program, produced in Montreal, Quebec by JPL Production II Inc. and Endemol USA for TVA, is hosted by Julie Snyder. The show's main sponsors are Vidéotron, Hyundai, Maxi, Nissan, Capital One and Sunwing Airlines.

The show's first season ended on March 29, 2007. During the first season, episodes aired on Wednesdays at 9 pm and Thursdays at 8 pm. During the second season, episodes aired on Sundays at 7 pm and Thursdays at 8 pm.

== Gameplay ==
As this version of the franchise is produced by the US arm of Endemol, the rules are played similar to the American version: the number of cases opened in each round starts with six cases in round one, then five in round two, and so on, all the way down to one case in round six and subsequent rounds. The game is practically the same as the American version, except that the largest cash prize is $500,000 (originally to have been $250,000) and it is tax-free Canadian money. Of the 26 models, 6 of them are men, holding cases 21 through 26. This is in contrast to the other versions airing in North America that use permanent models (Deal or No Deal, Vas o No Vas, Deal or No Deal Canada), where all models are women. (Note that the US daytime version, which closely resembles the British version, uses 22 cases held by the potential contestants.)

Like the US version, some of the offers may be prizes, in addition to, or instead of, a cash offer—as with the US show, the prizes tend to be what the contestant wants. For example: on the first episode on January 24, 2007, one contestant was offered $15,000, plus a mountain bike worth $1,000 (as there was an ET joke going on), plus tickets to see the Montreal Canadiens NHL hockey team play an upcoming game with the Carolina Hurricanes.

The highest amount won on the show thus far is $240,000, through a bank offer. On the final episode of the first season on March 29, 2007, the last contestant played for a top prize of $750,000 (replacing the $125,000). Before February 21, 2007, there was a $2,500 amount on the board which was then replaced with $125,000.

In addition, like in its US counterpart, there may also be some special prizes not attached to any offer. In the first episode, then-Canadiens' defenceman Sheldon Souray (now with the Edmonton Oilers) appeared in a video to wish a contestant luck and gave him an autographed hockey stick, not attached to any offer. Another example would be a contestant who was offered a trip for 5 people to Las Vegas, tickets to see Celine Dion's show and the chance to meet Celine in person. A premise unique to this version is that if an offer with a prize attached is rejected by the contestant, then a member of the audience (via random draw) will win the prize. Le Banquier was also used as a venue to propose a marriage: during the second offer of the second game on the debut January 24 episode, a contestant got engaged.

The imaging used in this version, including the money board, captions and audio cues, are similar to the US version, as both Fish Eggs (graphics) and Groove Addicts (music) are involved in the graphics and music in all four North American versions of the show (US English and Spanish, Canada English and French). Both firms are actively used by Endemol, and all four shows carry an Endemol USA copyright.

TVA also had their own Lucky Case Game, though like Deal or No Deal Canada, the lucky winner wins a prize instead of cash; the cases are revealed one at a time (from left to right).

== Second season ==
The show's second season began Sunday, September 23, 2007 at 8 pm ET on TVA, with a special 90-minute episode, with Celine Dion as host, Snyder as contestant and Celine's husband, René Angélil, as "Le Banquier". Also, the top row of models was replaced with friends of Julie's, including former Canadian Prime Minister Brian Mulroney. Howie Mandel, the host of the US and English-Canadian editions of Deal or No Deal, also made an appearance, via satellite, to wish a happy birthday to Julie. This expanded episode, and role reversal, was in celebration of Julie Snyder's 40th birthday.

For several episodes in the second season, the top prize was increased to $750,000, as Loto-Québec, the provincial lottery agency, was the main sponsor for these shows. However, afterward, the top amount went back to $500,000.

Sometime in February 2008, a seventh six-figure amount was added to the board, $250,000, replacing $15,000.

== Third season ==
The third season premiered September 2008 back on TVA. The background music was adjusted to that of the current American version. The seventh six-figure amount, $125,000, was replaced with the previous amount of $15,000. As well, a "half-million dollar mission" began on the show, as there has not been a winner of the top prize. In 2009, the top prize was increased to $1,000,000 and the case values were exactly the same as the US version, but in Canadian dollars.

== Case values (as of 2007) ==
$0.01	$1,000
$1	$5,000
$5	$10,000
$10	$25,000
$20	$50,000
$50	$100,000
$75	$125,000
$100	$150,000
$200	$175,000
$300	$200,000
$400	$300,000
$500	$400,000
$750	$500,000

== Special prizes ==
Beginning in 2012, each game features three prizes provided by some of the show's sponsors. Two of these prizes appear in cases valued at $25,000 or less, and the values of each count towards the contestant's final total.

- Surprise: The contestant wins a bonus prize that usually relates to one of their personal hobbies, interests or wishes.
- Sunwing: Introduced in 2014, the contestant wins a vacation to an exotic location. Originally sponsored by Quebec supermarket chain Maxi.
- Vidéotron Mobile: Replaced the $10,000 amount on the board. The contestant wins a $10,000 bonus, theirs to keep regardless of the outcome of the game. If the contestant plays to the end and finds Vidéotron Mobile in their chosen case, the bonus is doubled to $20,000. Capital One sponsored this bonus from 2012 to 2014.

== Statistics ==
- Highest amount won (Deal): $255,000
- Highest amount won (No Deal): $125,000
- Lowest amount won (Deal): $14.22 + one-year subscription to 7 Jours magazine + photo in 7 Jours + 50 pairs of white socks
- Lowest amount won (No Deal): $5
  - Although this contestant won only $5 from her case, she won over $71,000 in cash and prizes, including a vacation, $10,000 from Capital One, and a new car.
- Best deal: 4,100,000 times more than case — $41,000 for $0.01
- Best deal by dollars: $254,999 more than case — $255,000 for $1
- Worst deal: 15% of case value — $60,000 (plus a $15,000 Ski-Doo) for $500,000
- Highest potential offer: $389,000

== Lottery game ==
There was also a Loto-Québec scratch ticket based on this version of the show; 26 amounts, 25 cases. Top prize is $50,000. The player must uncover each case, and scratch the amount that was uncovered. The unscratched amount is what the player wins.

== Celebrities ==
Celebrities who have played the game include Celine Dion (who appeared on the show twice).

== See also ==
- List of Quebec television series imports and exports
- Deal or No Deal Canada
