= Infoman =

- Genre: Satire
- Directed by: Jean-René Dufort; André Lavoie
- Presented by: Jean-René Dufort
- Starring: Chantal Lamarre; Mc Gilles; Olivier Niquet; Jean-Philippe Pleau; Jean-Philippe Wauthier
- Country of origin: Canada
- Original language: French

Production
- Executive producers: André Larin; Vincent Leduc; Michel Bissonnette; Brigitte Lemonde
- Producer: Richard Gohier
- Production locations: Montreal, Québec
- Running time: 21 minutes
- Production companies: Radio-Canada; Zone 3

Original release
- Network: Radio-Canada
- Release: 2000

Infoman is a half-hour-long televised series satirizing the current events of Quebec, Canada, and the world hosted by Jean-René Dufort on Ici Radio-Canada Télé.

== Production details ==
Politicians, the hot-button issues in the news, and pop culture are the subjects of the show, presented with a clean sense of humor. The show is known for its irreverence towards federal politicians.

Originally airing at 7:30 on Fridays, the show moved to the Thursday slot at the beginning of 2006, then in 2007, Saturday at the same time. In its eighth season, Infoman returned to its Thursday time slot. Each week, Chantal Lamarre presents a five-minute segment wherein she complains about things which are sometimes relevant to the news. Journalist MC Gilles also has a column each week.

Since 2007 the series has conducted and presented the Prix Aurore, voted on by Quebec film critics to name the worst Quebec films of the year.

During the 2010 Gemini Awards, Infoman won 3 Geminis: best humor special, best comedy series, and best direction in a comedy series.

In fall 2017, Infoman presented its 18th season of the show.
