= 450, Chemin du Golf =

Canadian television series

450, Chemin du Golf is a Canadian French language sitcom previously aired on TQS. The show revolves around how a suburban neighbourhood is turned upside-down when someone new moves into the area. The series stars François Massicotte, a well-known Québécois. The title of the show refers to the 450 area code that is used for most of the suburbs off the island of Montreal.
