= Occupation Double =

Canadian reality television show

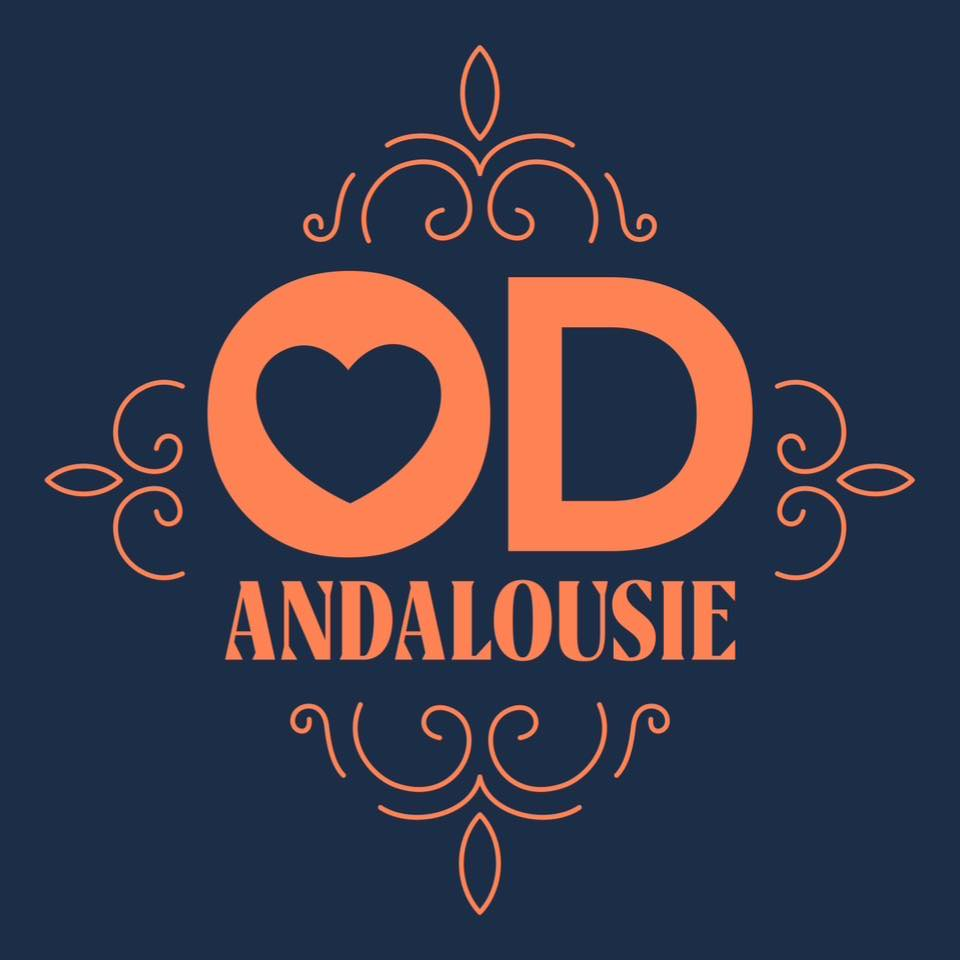
- OD Andalousia logo
- Genre: Reality show
- Presented by: Éric Salvail; Joël Legendre; Pierre-Yves Lord; Sébastien Benoît; Jay Du Temple; Frédéric Robichaud; Alicia Moffet
- Opening theme: Mitsou (2003−2013); Valérie Daure (2017−2022); FouKi (2023−)
- Country of origin: Canada
- Original language: French

Production
- Producer: Julie Snyder
- Production location: Various
- Running time: 30 min
- Production company: Productions J

Original release
- Network: TVA (2003−2013); Noovo (2017−)
- Release: September 18, 2003 – present

Occupation Double (sometimes referenced as OD) is a Canadian French language reality show which first aired in 2003. It is broadcast on Noovo, following a decade during which it was broadcast on TVA. As of 2025, the hosts of the show are former contestant Frédéric Robichaud and ex-partner, singer Alicia Moffet. The show was previously hosted by Jay Du Temple.

The sixth edition of Occupation Double premiered on September 27, 2009. For the first time, the entirety of the show took place in a foreign country, the Dominican Republic. The seventh season took place in Whistler, British Columbia; the eighth, in Portugal; the ninth, in the United States; the tenth, in Spain and French Polynesia; the eleventh, in Indonesia; the twelfth, in Greece; and the thirteenth, in South Africa. In 2020, it was announced that the show would be filmed in Quebec due to the COVID-19 pandemic in Quebec in a season entitled, "OD: Chez Nous".

== Concepts ==
Occupation Double is a reality competition show featuring singles selected through auditions and seeking romantic relationships. The selected individuals live together in houses, generally separated by gender, and participate in various challenges and excursions designed to encourage relationships between contestants.

Each week, a contestant is eliminated alternating by gender. The men eliminate one woman, and the next week vice versa until a finalist couple wins numerous prizes totaling several hundred thousand dollars.

== Seasons ==
=== Season 1 (2003) ===
==== Miscellaneous information ====
- The host was Éric Salvail
- Finalist Natacha made an impression when she ran in her underwear through the streets of the suburbs to join the boys' house.

==== Winning couple ====
Éric and Isabelle (are no longer together)

=== Season 2 (2004) ===
==== Miscellaneous information ====
- The host was Éric Salvail.
- Bérangère left the adventure to join Maxime, with whom she was in love, after the latter was eliminated. Maximè was eliminated after his ex-girlfriend testified that she and Maxime were still a couple at the beginning of the show.

==== Winning couple ====
Hugo and Marie-Ève (no longer together)

=== Season 3 (2006) ===
==== Miscellaneous information ====
- The host was Joël Legendre.
- Maripier Morin is, among the candidates of the 3rd season, the one who stood out the most. A few years after her time on OD, she got various roles on TV, in shows like Le banquier, Sucré salé, District V and Ça commence bien!

==== Winning Couples ====
Robin and Isabelle (no longer together)

=== Season 4 (2007) ===
==== Winning Couples ====
Stéphanie and Gabriel (no longer together)

=== Season 5 (2008) ===
==== Winning Couples ====
Jessica and Samuel (no longer together)

=== Season 6 (2009) ===
==== Winning Couples ====
Marie-Ève and Guillaume (are no longer together)

=== Season 7 (Whistler), 2010) ===
==== Miscellaneous information ====
- While the public was aware, Judith was unaware that her boyfriend Jimmy was a dancer at 281, a strip club in Montreal. He finally confessed to her during the final trip to Bora Bora, at which point Judith exclaimed "Is there any cognac here?"
- The host of this season was Pierre-Yves Lord.

==== Winning Couples ====
Nathalie and Charles (are no longer together)

=== Season 8 (Portugal, 2011) ===
==== Miscellaneous information ====
The finale was marked by major controversy. Couples Dave and Odile and Georges-Olivier and Nancy were the finalists of Occupation Double Portugal. Before the winning couple was announced, Nancy said she wanted to withdraw and that she was not up to the prizes, considering them "too big." As she tried to leave, the host Pierre-Yves Lord, Georges-Olivier and her own family urged her to stay until the winning couple was announced. Although she and Georges-Olivier were the winners, they did not kiss.

=== Season 9 (California, 2012) ===
==== Miscellaneous information ====
One of the highlights of this season was a party where Laurie, exasperated by Érika, shouted "Hey! u want me to get on my nerves?" ».

==== Winning Couples ====
Andréanne Marquis and Hubert Harvey (are no longer together)

=== Season 10 (Spain, 2013) ===
==== Winning Couples ====
Cintia and Kaled (are no longer together)

=== Season 11 (Bali, 2017) ===
The 11th season, commonly called "OD Bali", was hosted by comedian Jay Du Temple and aired from 1 October 2017 on V, after 4 years of absence.

==== Miscellaneous information ====
- The season was watched by more than a million viewers each week.
- On the way to the finale, the indonesian Agung volcano, located on the island of Bali, erupted. During his appearance on the show Tout le monde en parle, Jay Du Temple announced to the audience that the remaining candidates had been evacuated and were back on Canadian soil.
- Due to her reactions deemed excessive, candidate Joanie Perron shocked the audience both on television and on social media. In particular, she used a racist term when she complained about having to do the dishes. This incident gave rise to a petition on the Change.org website demanding her expulsion. The petition has collected more than 7500 signatures. The candidate's mother expressed in an interview with the Journal de Montréal her dissatisfaction with several aspects of the show:
  If my daughter wasn't here, there wouldn't be a show. Everything is focused on her. But we only show the bad side of people
  .

==== Winning couples ====
Alexandra and Adamo (are no longer together).

=== Season 12 (Greece, 2018) ===
==== Miscellaneous information ====
- The elimination of Maude and Jonathan, which occurred following a poisoned chalice from the production, caused discontent among many viewers, who circulated a petition that raised almost 13,000 signatures.
- The winning couple of this edition is composed of Andrew O'Reilly and Catherine Paquin, Alanis' best friend, former candidate of the last season in Bali.

=== Season 13 (South Africa, 2019) ===
==== Miscellaneous information ====
- Bullying was a major topic in season 13. Indeed, Kevin was the target of many insults from other candidates who had a bad perception of him. This situation gave rise to a petition that has collected more than 25,000 signatures. The production ended up apologizing to the public and some candidates expressed remorse during the finale.
- A first trans woman participated in the reality TV show Occupation Double: Khate Lessard, 23 years old. She went there to support the LGBTQ+ community.

==== Audiences ====
The finale, which took place on December 1, 2019, was watched by 1,020,000 people live and in replay the same evening. The next day, 8 p.m. later, 177,000 people had watched the finale on Noovo.ca. The big winners of the final prize are Trudy Simoneau and Mathieu Robitaille. Kevin Lapierre won the prize for the favorite candidate.

===== Record audience =====
The daily Tuesday October 1, 2019 attracted nearly 631,000 viewers live on V. This is the best score for a daily reality TV show since its return in 2017. It should also be noted that the ratings do not include viewing of shows on Noovo.ca, which in 2017 attracted more than 7 million views.

On October 18, 2019, V published the audience results since the beginning of the adventure. On average, every Sunday, Occupation Double attracts 735,000 viewers. For the daily shows, it's an average of 650,000 people who follow the adventures of the candidates in South Africa. On Noovo.ca, the season's capsules and episodes, so far, have attracted 7 million views. V also mentions that the videos on the show's official Facebook page attract, on average, 2 million views each week.

=== Season 14 (Chez nous, 2020) ===
==== Miscellaneous information ====
- Candidate David was excluded before the adventure even began. His past run-ins with the law and the testimonies of certain women would have made the production decide to eliminate him from Occupation Double.
- After not being chosen on the red carpet, candidates Anne-Catherine and Cédrick formed a couple during their deconfinement in the house of the excluded.
- At the end of the 5th week, a controversial and unprecedented situation occurred when it was revealed that Éloïse, while she was in preventive isolation due to a fear of contamination with COVID-19, had watched videos about the current season of OD on YouTube, which is not allowed. The production did not immediately react and left it to the participants to eliminate the girl of their choice, and the latter eliminated Julie. Some discontent arose on social networks and the production had to block public comments on Éloïse's account. The following Sunday, shaken by the consequences of her action, Éloïse declared that she wanted to leave the adventure just before the announcement of which girl would be eliminated. The candidates had put her photo in the envelope anyway
- The public received the couple well, and several personalities such as Manon Massé. commented on this historic event for the show. *Candidates Marjorie and Cintia are the first female couple in the show's history.

==== Audience Favorite ====
Julie Munger won the $10,000 scholarship and the Audience Favorite Candidate Award.

==== Winning couples ====
The winning couple of this edition was the couple composed of Noémie Marleau and Vincent Beauregard.

=== Season 15 (Dans l’Ouest, 2021) ===
The 15th season, titled OD dans l'Ouest, is hosted by comedian Jay Du Temple and airs from September 23, 2021 on Noovo.

==== Participants ====
Source: Noovo website

===== Adventure 1 =====
Boys
Candidates	Age	City	Profession	Arrival	Departure	Status
Frédérick	24 years old	Rivière-du-Loup, Quebec	Entrepreneur	Week 1	Week 11	Finalist
Luca	26 years old	Sherbrooke, Quebec	Nurse	Week 1	Week 10	Excluded
Philippe	26 years old	Acton-Vale, Quebec	Steel erector	Week 5	Week 8	Excluded
Mathieu	26 years old	Whistler, Canada	Glazier	Week 5	Week 6	Not chosen
Patrice	23 years old	Quebec, Quebec	Barber	Week 1	Week 4	Excluded
Antoine	26 years old	Brossard, Quebec	Hypnotist	Week 1	Week 3	Abandoned

Girls
Candidates	Age	City	Profession	Arrival	Departure	Status
Marilou	22 years old	Jonquière, Québec	Model	Week 5	Week 11	Finalist
Amélie	23 years old	Mascouche, Québec	Marketing student	Week 1	Week 10	Excluded
Sarah-Donia	27 years old	Laval, Québec	Clinical Nurse	Week 5	Week 8	Excluded
Kathleen	30 years old	Longueuil, Québec	Insurance Sales Support	Week 1	Week 7	Excluded
Sabrina	23 years old	Sherbrooke, Quebec	Kinesiology student	Week 1	Week 6	Excluded
Carol-Anne	26 years old	Repentigny, Quebec	Professional dancer	Week 1	Week 4	Excluded
Jolie-Ann	29 years old	Montreal, Quebec	Civil servant	Week 1	Week 4	Excluded
Jenny	22 years old	Laval, Quebec	Flight attendant	Week 1	Week 3	Excluded
Rasheeda	26 years old	Terrebonne, Quebec	Construction worker	Week 1	Week 3	Excluded
Vanessa	31 years old	Montreal, Quebec	Communications Coordinator	Week 1	Week 2	Excluded

===== Adventure 2 =====
Girls
Candidates	Age	City	Occupation	Arrival	Departure	Status
Ines	28 years old	Terrebonne, Quebec	Marketing student	Week 1	Week 11	Winner
Audrey	31 years old	Montreal, Quebec	Beauty product salesperson	Week 1	Week 11	Finalist
Clodelle	27 years old	Montreal, Quebec	Singer and model	Week 1	Week 9	Dropped out
Alexandra	27 years old	Vancouver, BC	Flight attendant	Week 1	Week 9	Dropped out

Boys
Candidates	Age	City	Occupation	Arrival	Departure	Status
Stevens	26 years old	Montreal, Quebec	Professional athlete	Week 1	Week 11	Winner
Robin	25 years old	Rosemère, Quebec	Carpenter-joiner	Week 1	Week 11	Finalist
Alexandre Y.	24 years old	Salaberry-de-Valleyfield, Quebec	Coach	Week 1	Week 9	Withdrawal
Jackson	26 years old	Laval, Quebec	Construction engineering student	Week 1	Week 9	Abandoned
Nicolas	28 years old	Montreal, Quebec	Bar manager	Week 1	Week 7	Excluded
Pierre-Alexandre	33 years old	Montreal, Quebec	Airline pilot	Week 1	Week 5	Excluded
Yannick	26 years old	Quebec, Quebec	Landscaping contractor	Week 1	Week 2	Excluded
Alexandre P.	31 years old	Mascouche, Quebec	Restaurant manager	Week 1	Week 1	Excluded by Production

==== Miscellaneous information ====
- Only four boys were revealed to the public during the unveiling of the candidates to the public, while twelve girls were revealed.
- During the red carpet, the host, Jay Du Temple, announces that there will be 2 adventures in this version.
- Alexandre, a candidate from adventure 2 of this version, was ousted from the show by the production because of his behavioral problems. *At the end of the season, actors and actresses got together with Jay Du Temple to reinterpret certain scenes from various seasons of Occupation Double.

==== Audience Favorite ====
Frédérick wins the audience favorite award.

==== Winning couple ====
Ines and Stevens win with a prize worth CA$600,000 including a loft refuge in the Eastern Townships.

=== Season 16 (Martinique, 2022) ===
The 16th season of Occupation double Martinique marks the show's return to normalcy. Due to COVID-19, the last two seasons had to take place in Canada only. This year, the participants have the opportunity to travel around the globe again. Once again, it is the comedian Jay du Temple who occupies the position of host of the show. However, the role of "Lady Pagaille" is occupied by the very first Board of Directors (CA) of OD. The CA is originally made up of 4 candidates whose mission is to control the adventure of the two other houses. During the adventure, they will have important and especially heartbreaking decisions to make. The lucky ones who were able to access the adventure of OD Martinique are the following:

Girls
Candidates	Age	City	Profession	Arrival	Departure	Status
Claudia	26 years old	Repentigny, Quebec	Accountant	Week 1	Week 11	Winner
Aïssa	24 years old	Montreal, Quebec	Bachelor's degree student in nursing	Week 1	Week 11	Finalist
Virginie	27 years old	Quebec, Quebec	Hairdresser	Week 1	Week 10	Excluded
Sandrine	23 years old	Drummondville, Quebec	Security student Financial	Week 6	Week 10	Excluded
Koralie-Maya	22 years old	Longueuil, Quebec	Hairdresser	Week 1	Week 9	Dropped out
Florence	23 years old	Montreal, Quebec	Model and journalism student	Week 1	Week 8	Dropped out
Kiana	25 years old	Montreal, Quebec	Financial advisor	Week 3	Week 8	Dropped out
Ally	22 years old	Quebec, Quebec	Head waiter	Week 1	Week 7	Excluded
Catherine	28 years old	Blainville, Quebec	Yoga teacher and content creator	Week 3	Week 6	Excluded
Sabrina	26 years old	Sherbrooke, Quebec	Financial advisor	Week 3	Week 4	Not chosen
Dominique	29 years old	Montreal, Quebec	Sexology student	Week 1	Week 4	Excluded
Mégane	26 years old	Terrebonne, Quebec	Owner of a high-end saddlery	Week 1	Week 2	Excluded

Boys
Candidates	Age	City	Profession	Arrival	Departure	Status
Jimy	29 years old	Saint-Jean-sur-Richelieu, Quebec	Tiler	Week 1	Week 11	Winner
Walide	28 years old	Montreal, Quebec	Personal attendant	Week 1	Week 11	Finalist
Rami	23 years old	Montreal, Quebec	Mechanical engineering student	Week 3	Week 10	Excluded
Zacharie	23 years old	Trois-Rivières, Quebec	Sports massage therapist	Week 1	Week 10	Excluded
Isaack	24 years old	Saint-Charles-sur-Richelieu, Quebec	Model	Week 1	Week 8	Evicted
Philippe	27 years old	Sainte-Anne-des-Lacs, Quebec	Construction contractor	Week 1	Week 8	Evicted
Félix	24 years old	Montreal, Quebec	Chemical process operator	Week 1	Week 7	Excluded
Tommy	27 years old	Blainville, Quebec	DJ and electronic music producer	Week 3	Week 5	Excluded
Jonathan	26 years old	Saint-Basile-le-Grand, Quebec	Firefighter and carpenter-joiner	Week 1	Week 3	Given up
Marc-Olivier	26 years old	Saint-Bruno, Quebec	Construction contractor	Week 1	Week 1	Given up
Olivier	24 years old	Montreal, Quebec	Barman	Week 1	Week 1	Not chosen
Dave	29 years old	Laval, Quebec	Personal trainer	Week 1	Week 1	Not chosen

Board members
Candidates	Age	City	Profession	Arrival	Departure	Status	Integration
Megan	23 years old	Montreal, Quebec	Bachelor's student in education	Week 1	Week 10	Excluded	Week 1
Freeman	27 years old	Montreal, Quebec	Content creator	Week 1	Week 10	Excluded	Week 1
Michaël F.	23 years old	Saint-Eustache, Quebec	Photographer	Week 1	Week 10	Excluded	Week 2
Clémence	25 years old	Montreal, Quebec	Sales Representative	Week 1	Week 10	Excluded	Week 3
Mickael D.	23 years old	Saint-Lin-des-Laurentides, Quebec	Steel Installer	Week 3	Week 10	Excluded	Week 7

==== Miscellaneous information ====
- Catherine's interest in Tommy has caused a lot of talk, especially for content creator Emy-Jade Greaves, since Tommy is her ex and Catherine is her friend.
- Félix, Isaack and Philippe were expelled for bullying other candidates. The latter three created an unhealthy climate and scared away sponsors of reality TV. The three Expelled candidates are no longer in the episodes as of October 20, 2022.
- Kiana and Florence abandon the adventure due to the tense situation since the expulsion of Félix, Isaack and Philippe.
- Koralie-Maya abandons the adventure due to Rami's infidelity.
- During the grand finale, host Jay du Temple announces that he is leaving his role as host of Occupation double.

==== Miscellaneous information ====
- Catherine's interest in Tommy has caused a lot of talk, especially for content creator Emy-Jade Greaves, since Tommy is her ex and Catherine is her friend.
- Félix, Isaack, and Philippe were kicked out for bullying other contestants. The latter three created an unhealthy climate and scared away sponsors of the reality TV show. The three Expelled candidates are no longer in the episodes as of October 20, 2022.
- Kiana and Florence are abandoning the adventure due to the tense situation since the expulsion of Félix, Isaack and Philippe.
- Koralie-Maya abandons the adventure due to Rami's infidelity.
- During the grand finale, host Jay du Temple announces that he is leaving his role as host of Occupation double.

==== Controversy surrounding bullying ====
Since the wave of bullying that Jonathan and Tommy experienced during their time on OD. Following the revelations, sponsors decided to break their partnership by way of press release: Shop Santé, Oraki, Polysleep, Twenty Compass, That'so, Nial Création, Lambert, Couche-tard, Guru as well as Finstar. Finstar was a sponsor mainly for the grand prize of the winning couple, therefore a condo in Sainte-Agathe-des-Monts.

In addition, several candidates from previous editions have expressed having experienced intimidation and felt abandoned by the production, including Charle Montigny and Karine Saint-Michel.

==== Winning couple ====
- Couple: Claudia and Jimy
- Favorite candidate: Jonathan and Virginie
- Favorite CA candidate: Megan

=== Season 17 (Spain, 2023) ===
The 17th season will be hosted for the first time by a couple, namely Alicia Moffet and Frédérick Robichaud. Frédérick participated in season 15 (OD in the West). This season will take place for the second time in Spain.

Finalists: Simon and Mia, Lara and Vincent, Rebecca and Mathieu P

Winner of the season: Simon and Mia

Favorite candidate: Céline

Girls
Candidates	Age	City	Professions	Arrival	Departure	Status
Mia	22 years old	Trois-Rivières, Quebec	Social work student	Week 1	Week 11	Winner
Lara	27 years old	Boisbriand, Quebec	Sales representative	Week 1	Week 11	Finalist
Rébecca	26 years old	Sainte-Thérèse, Quebec	Social worker	Week 1	Week 11	Finalist
Marie-Andrée	26 years old	Saguenay, Quebec	Clinical Nurse	Week 1	Week 10	Excluded
Alexandra	27 years old	Montreal, Quebec	Master's student in Psychoeducation	Week 1	Week 8	Excluded
Laurence	24 years old	Roxton Falls, Montérégie, Quebec	Student in Human Sciences	Week 1	Week 7	Excluded
Céline	22 years old	Moncton N.B.	Clinical Nurse	Week 1	Week 6	Dropped
Marilyne	24 years old	Brossard, Quebec	Student in Psychology	Week 1	Week 5	Excluded
Léa	21 years old	Quebec, Quebec	Pharmacology student	Week 1	Week 2	Excluded
Racky	24 years old	Laval, Quebec	Actuarial analyst	Week 1	Week 1	Excluded

Boys
Candidates	Age	City	Professions	Arrival	Departure	Status
Simon	28 years old	Sainte-Thérèse, Quebec	Marketing consultant	Week 1	Week 11	Winner
Mathieu P.	24 years old	Laval, Quebec	Financial director	Week 1	Week 11	Finalist
Vincent	26 years old	Longueuil, Quebec	Carpenter-joiner	Week 1	Week 11	Finalist
Anthony	27 years old	Lévis, Quebec	Carpenter-joiner	Week 1	Week 10	Excluded
Antoine	31 years old	Montreal, Quebec	Restaurant owner	Week 1	Week 8	Excluded
Jérémy	28 years old	Trois-Rivières, Quebec	Real estate entrepreneur	Week 1	Week 7	Abandoned
Sami	27 years old	Edmundston, N.B.	Family physician	Week 1	Week 6	Excluded
Johanel	28 years old	Montreal, Quebec	Life insurance analyst	Week 1	Week 4	Excluded
Mathieu B.	23 years old	Longueuil, Quebec	Entrepreneur	Week 1	Week 3	Excluded
Dany	25 years old	Montreal, Quebec	Sales Representative	Week 1	Week 1	Excluded
Gabriel	25 years old	Laval, Quebec	Electromechanic	Week 1	Red Carpet	Not chosen
Jo	30 years old	Montreal, Quebec	Store Manager	Week 1	Red Carpet	Not chosen
Michaël	24 years old	Joliette, Quebec	Student in architecture	Week 1	Red Carpet	Not chosen

Surprise Duos
Candidates	Age	City	Profession	Arrival	Departure	Status
Alexandra	27 years old	Montreal, Quebec	Master's student in Psychoeducation	Week 1	Week 9	Excluded
Jérémy	28 years old	Trois-Rivières, Quebec	Real estate entrepreneur	Week 1	Week 7	Dropout
Léa	21 years old	Quebec, Quebec	Pharmacology student	Week 1	Week 2	Excluded
Sami	27 years old	Edmundston, N.B.	Family Doctor	Week 1	Week 6	Exclusive

Controversy of the season: Marie-Andrée and Anthony, the public's favorite couple, are eliminated before the final trip, so the public decides to vote for their friends who didn't vote to eliminate them, Mia and Simon. They therefore won the grand prize.

=== Season 18 (Mexico, 2024) ===
The 18th season, titled OD Mexico, is hosted by Frédérick Robichaud and Alicia Moffet and broadcast from September 8, 2024 on Noovo

Girls
Names	Age	City	Profession	Arrival	Departure	Status
Alix	29 years old	Montreal, Quebec	Marketing Consultant	Week ---		
Anna	23 years old	Thetford-Mines, Quebec	Bachelor's degree student in nutrition	Week 1		
Catherine F.	27 years old	Blainville, Quebec	Real estate broker	Week 1		
Catherine L.	24 years old	Alma, Lac-St-Jean, Quebec	Regional development agent	Week 1		
Fanny	25 years old	Montreal, Quebec	Pharmacist	Week 1		
Julianne	24 years old	Charlevoix, Quebec	Clinical Nurse	Week ---		
Kristina	23 years old	Montreal, Quebec	Fashion Representative	Week 1		
Maude	24 years old	Val-d'Or, Quebec	Model	Week 1		
Melek	22 years old	Montreal, Quebec	Makeup Artist	Week 1		
Shaïna	27 years old	Montreal, Quebec	Real Estate Broker	Week 1		
Solène	22 years old	Quebec, Quebec	Personal Trainer	Semauine ---		Winner
Stéphany	31 years old	Montreal, Quebec	Cybersecurity Specialist	Week 1		

Boys
Names	Age	City	Occupation	Arrival	Departure	Status
Aleksa	27 years old	Sherbrooke, Quebec	Entrepreneur	Week 1		
Alex	29 years old	Sainte-Julie. Quebec	Kinesiologist	Week ---		
Bilal	29 years old	Montreal, Quebec	Real estate broker	Week 1		
Carl	29 years old	New Carlisle, Gaspésie, Quebec	Paramedic	Week 1		
Étienne	24 years old	Québec, Québec	Server	Week 1		
Félix	29 years old	Saguenay, Québec	Software Developer	Week 1		Winner
Frédéric	26 years old	Montréal, Québec	Real Estate Broker	Week ---		
Mamadou	23 years old	Montréal, Québec	Barman	Week 1		
Maxime	25 years old	Sherbrooke, Québec	Restaurant Owner	Week ---		
Michaël	27 years old	Quebec, Quebec	Real estate broker	Week 1		
Raphaël	26 years old	Saint-Jean-Sur-Richelieu	Travel content creator	Week 1		
Jimmy	21 years old	Mandeville, Lanaudière, Quebec	Model	Week 1	Week 1	Excluded

This year in Occupation Double, it's mixed houses. Later during the season six new candidates will join the adventure.

Mixed House #1
Names	Arrived	In danger	Eliminated
Aleksa	Week 1		
Anna	Week 1		
Catherine L.	Week 1		
Kristina	Week 1		
Melek	Week 1		
Michaël	Week 1		
Shaïna	Week 1		
Stéphany	Week 1		

Mixed House #2
Names	Arrived	In Danger	Eliminated
Bilal	Week 1		
Carl	Week 1		
Catherine F.	Week 1		
Étienne	Week 1		
Fanny	Week 1		
Felix	Week 1		
Jimmy	Week 1		Excluded Week 1
Mamadou	Week 1		
Maude	Week 1		
Raphaël	Week 1		

== See also ==
- List of Quebec television series
- Television of Quebec
- Culture of Quebec
- Reality television
