= List of Canadian films of 1987 =

This is a list of Canadian films which were released in 1987:

Title	Director	Cast	Genre	Notes
Artist on Fire	Kay Armatage	Joyce Wieland	Documentary	
Blindside	Paul Lynch		Thriller	
Blue City Slammers	Peter Shatalow	Tracy Cunningham, Eric Keenleyside, Murray Westgate, Fran Gebhard	Sports/drama	
Blue Monkey	William Fruet	Steve Railsback, Gwynyth Walsh, Don Lake, Sandy Webster, Helen Slayton-Hughes, John Vernon	Horror	
Boy, Girl	Bruce LaBruce		Short drama	
The Boys on the Bus	Bob McKeown	Edmonton Oilers	Sports documentary	
Brother André (Le Frère André)	Jean-Claude Labrecque	Marc Legault, Sylvie Ferlatte	Drama	
Burglar	Hugh Wilson	Whoopi Goldberg	Comedy	
The Canneries	Stephen Insley, Bonni Devlin		Documentary	
Captive Hearts	Paul Almond		Drama	
The Care Bears Adventure in Wonderland	Raymond Jafelice	voices Tracey Moore, Colin Fox, Bob Dermer, Jim Henshaw	Animation	Last of the Care Bears features
Caribe	Michael Kennedy		Thriller	
Concrete Angels	Carlo Liconti	Joseph Di Mambro, Omie Craden, Luke McKeehan, Tony Nardi	Musical drama	
Crazy Moon	Allan Eastman	Kiefer Sutherland, Ken Pogue	Drama co-produced by the National Film Board	
Dance for Modern Times	Moze Mossanen	Christopher House, David Earle, James Kudelka, Ginette Laurin, Danny Grossman	Documentary	
Deaf to the City (Le sourd dans la ville)	Mireille Dansereau		Drama	
Determinations	Oliver Hockenhull		Documentary, experimental	
Dreams Beyond Memory	Andrzej Markiewicz	George Touliatos, Lisa Schrage, Maruska Stankova	Drama	
Family Viewing	Atom Egoyan	David Hemblen, Aidan Tierney, Gabrielle Rose, Arsinée Khanjian	Drama	
Fashion 99	Karen Firus	Sharron Kearney	Short drama	
Foster Child	Gil Cardinal		National Film Board documentary	Broadcast on CBC-TV
Future Block	Kevin McCracken	Maury Chaykin, Walter Massey, Kathleen Fee, Wally Martin	Animated short	
The Gate	Tibor Takács	Stephen Dorff, Louis Tripp, Christa Denton, Kelly Rowan, Jennifer Irwin	Horror	Special effects by Randall William Cook; Golden Reel Award; made with U.S. financing
George and Rosemary	Alison Snowden, David Fine	narrator Cec Linder	National Film Board animated short	Genie Award – Short Film; Academy Award nomination – Animated Short
God Rides a Harley	Stavros C. Stavrides		Documentary	
Graveyard Shift	Jerry Ciccoritti		Horror	
The Heart Exposed (Le Cœur découvert)	Jean-Yves Laforce	Michel Poirier, Gilles Renaud	Drama	
Hello Mary Lou: Prom Night II	Bruce Pittman	Michael Ironside, Lisa Schrage, Wendy Lyon, Richard Monette	Horror	
Home Is Where the Hart Is	Rex Bromfield	Leslie Nielsen, Valri Bromfield, Martin Mull	Comedy	
I've Heard the Mermaids Singing	Patricia Rozema	Sheila McCarthy, Paule Baillargeon, Ann-Marie MacDonald	Drama	Genie Awards – Actress (McCarthy), Supporting Actress (Baillargeon); Cannes Film Festival – Prix de la Jeunesse
The Last Straw	Giles Walker	Sam Grana, Stefan Wodoslawsky, Christine Pak, Fernanda Tavares	Comedy	
Life Classes	William D. MacGillivray	Jacinta Cormier, Leon Dubinsky	Drama	Entered into the 38th Berlin International Film Festival
Lupo the Butcher	Danny Antonucci		Animated	
The Man Who Planted Trees	Frédéric Back	Narrator: Philippe Noiret (French) & Christopher Plummer (English)	Animated short	Based on a short story by Jean Giono; Academy Award winner and screened at Cannes
Marie in the City (Marie s'en va-t-en ville)	Marquise Lepage	Frédérique Collin, Geneviève Lenoir	Drama	
Night Friend	Peter Gerretsen	Chuck Shamata, Heather Kjollesdal, Daniel MacIvor, Jayne Eastwood	Drama	
Night Zoo (Un Zoo la nuit)	Jean-Claude Lauzon	Gilles Maheu, Germain Houde, Roger Lebel, Lynne Adams, Lorne Brass	Crime drama	Record-setting: 13 Genie Awards
Obsessed	Robin Spry	Kerrie Keane, Colleen Dewhurst, Saul Rubinek, Daniel Pilon	Drama	Genie Award – Supporting Actress (Dewhurst)
The Pink Chiquitas	Anthony Currie		Comedy	
Primiti Too Taa	Ed Ackerman, Colin Morton		Experimental animation	
Rebel High	John Fasano		Horror	
Rock 'n' Roll Nightmare	Bruce LaBruce		Short drama	
Seductio	Bashar Shbib		Drama	
Storm	David Winning	David Palffy, Stan Kane	Drama	
Striker's Mountain	Alan Simmonds	Leslie Nielsen, August Schellenberg, Mimi Kuzyk, Bruce Greenwood	Adventure drama	
Taking Care	Clarke Mackey	Janet Amos, Kate Lynch, Saul Rubinek	Drama	
Tomorrow's a Killer	George Kaczender		Thriller	
Too Outrageous!	Richard Benner	Craig Russell, Hollis McLaren, Ron White	Drama	
Train of Dreams	John N. Smith	Basil Danchyshyn, Milton Hartman	National Film Board drama	Special Jury Prize, Chicago International Film Festival
The Virgin Queen of St. Francis High	Francesco Lucente		Comedy	
A Winter Tan	John Walker, Louise Clark, John Frizzell, Jackie Burroughs, Aerlyn Weissman	Jackie Burroughs, Erando Gonzales	Drama based on the writings of Maryse Holder	Genie Award – Actress (Burroughs)
The Young Magician	Waldemar Dziki	Rusty Jedwab, Daria Trafankowska, Mariusz Benoit	Children's drama	Canadian-Polish coproduction

== See also ==
- 1987 in Canada
- 1987 in Canadian television
