= Canadian Screen Award for Best Feature Length Documentary =

Canadian documentary film award

- Country: Canada
- Presented by: Academy of Canadian Cinema & Television
- First award: 1968
- Currently held by: Endless Cookie (2025)
- Website: academy.ca/awards

The Academy of Canadian Cinema and Television presents an annual award for Best Feature Length Documentary. First presented in 1968 as part of the Canadian Film Awards, it became part of the Genie Awards in 1980 and the contemporary Canadian Screen Awards in 2013.

Under current Academy regulations, the awards for Best Feature Length Documentary and Best Short Documentary can be collapsed into a single award for Best Documentary if either category receives three or fewer eligible submissions, but remain separate if both categories surpass three submissions.

== 1960s ==
Year	Film	Filmmakers	Ref
1968; 20th Canadian Film Awards
1968; 20th Canadian Film Awards	Never a Backward Step	Donald Brittain, Arthur Hammond, John Spotton	
1969; 21st Canadian Film Awards
1969; 21st Canadian Film Awards	Good Times Bad Times	Donald Shebib, Mark McCarty	

== 1970s ==
Year	Film	Filmmakers	Ref
1970; 22nd Canadian Film Awards
1970; 22nd Canadian Film Awards	Wild Africa	William Bantings, John Livingston	
1971; 23rd Canadian Film Awards
1971; 23rd Canadian Film Awards	Les Philharmonistes	Yves Leduc	
1972; 24th Canadian Film Awards
1972; 24th Canadian Film Awards	No award presented		
1973; 25th Canadian Film Awards
1973; 25th Canadian Film Awards	Coming Home	Bill Reid	
1974
1974	No award presented		
1975; 26th Canadian Film Awards
1975; 26th Canadian Film Awards	Janis	F. R. Crawley	
1976; 27th Canadian Film Awards
1976; 27th Canadian Film Awards	Ahô: The Forest People (Ahô au cœur du monde primitif)	Daniel Bertolino, François Floquet	
1977; 28th Canadian Film Awards
1977; 28th Canadian Film Awards	The Inquiry Film: A Report on the Mackenzie Valley Pipeline	Jesse Nishihata	
1977; 28th Canadian Film Awards	Famille et variations	Mireille Dansereau, Anne Claire Poirier	
1977; 28th Canadian Film Awards	Games of the XXI Olympiad (Jeux de la XXIe olympiade)	Jacques Bobet, Ashley Murray, Jean Beaudin, Marcel Carrière, Georges Dufaux, Jean-Claude Labrecque	
1977; 28th Canadian Film Awards	Homage to Chagall: The Colours of Love	Harry Rasky	
1978; 29th Canadian Film Awards
1978; 29th Canadian Film Awards	The Champions	Donald Brittain	
1978; 29th Canadian Film Awards	Fields of Endless Day	Terence Macartney-Filgate	
1978; 29th Canadian Film Awards	Healing	Pierre Lasry	
1978; 29th Canadian Film Awards	The Prophet from Pugwash	Carol Moore-Ede Myers	

== 1980s ==
Year	Film	Filmmakers	Ref
1980; 1st Genie Awards
1980; 1st Genie Awards	Paperland: The Bureaucrat Observed	Donald Brittain, Marrin Canell	
1980; 1st Genie Awards	Dieppe 1942	Terence Macartney-Filgate	
1980; 1st Genie Awards	Cities: Glenn Gould's Toronto	John McGreevy, W. Paterson Ferns	
1981; 2nd Genie Awards
1981; 2nd Genie Awards	Some Even Fall in Love (Plusieurs tombent en amour)	Guy Simoneau	
1981; 2nd Genie Awards	The Dream Never Dies	William Johnston	
1981; 2nd Genie Awards	A Wives' Tale (Une histoire de femmes)	Arthur Lamothe	
1982; 3rd Genie Awards
1982; 3rd Genie Awards	P4W: Prison for Women	Janis Cole, Holly Dale	
1982; 3rd Genie Awards	Being Different	Harry Rasky	
1983; 4th Genie Awards
1983; 4th Genie Awards	The Devil at Your Heels	Robert Fortier, Adam Symansky, Bill Brind	
1983; 4th Genie Awards	Gala	Michael McKennirey, John N. Smith	
1983; 4th Genie Awards	The Great Chess Movie (Jouer sa vie)	Hélène Verrier	
1984; 5th Genie Awards
1984; 5th Genie Awards	Pourquoi l'étrange Monsieur Zolock s'intéressait-il tant à la bande dessinée?	Nicole M. Boisvert	
1984; 5th Genie Awards	The Ballad of Hard Times (La Turlute des années dures)	Lucille Veilleux	
1984; 5th Genie Awards	Thunder Drum (Mémoire battante)	Nicole Lamothe, Arthur Lamothe	
1985; 6th Genie Awards
1985; 6th Genie Awards	Raoul Wallenberg: Buried Alive	David Harel, Wayne Arron	
1985; 6th Genie Awards	Hookers on Davie	Holly Dale, Janis Cole	
1985; 6th Genie Awards	To the Rhythm of My Heart (Au rythme de mon coeur)	Jean Pierre Lefebvre	
1986; 7th Genie Awards
1986; 7th Genie Awards	Final Offer	Robert Collison, Sturla Gunnarsson	
1986; 7th Genie Awards	Artie Shaw: Time Is All You've Got	Brigitte Berman	
1986; 7th Genie Awards	The Choice of a People (Le Choix d'un peuple)	Bernard Lalonde	
1986; 7th Genie Awards	Tears Are Not Enough	John Zaritsky	
1986; 7th Genie Awards	Waterwalker	Bill Mason	
1987; 8th Genie Awards
1987; 8th Genie Awards	Dads and Kids	Christian Bruyère	
1987; 8th Genie Awards	Dream Tracks (Les Traces du rêve)	Jacques Vallée	
1987; 8th Genie Awards	?O, Zoo!: The Making of a Fiction Film	Philip Hoffman	
1987; 8th Genie Awards	Ranch: The Alan Wood Ranch Project	Steven DeNure, Chris Lowry	
1987; 8th Genie Awards	Return to Departure: The Biography of a Painting	Kirk Tougas	
1988; 9th Genie Awards
1988; 9th Genie Awards	God Rides a Harley	Stavros C. Stavrides, Andreas Erne	
1988; 9th Genie Awards	The Canneries	Stephen Insley. Bonni Devlin	
1988; 9th Genie Awards	Dance for Modern Times	Moze Mossanen	
1988; 9th Genie Awards	Elephant Dreams	Martha Davis	
1988; 9th Genie Awards	To Hurt and to Heal	Laura Sky	
1989; 10th Genie Awards
1989; 10th Genie Awards	Comic Book Confidential	Ron Mann	
1989; 10th Genie Awards	Calling the Shots	Janis Cole, Holly Dale	
1989; 10th Genie Awards	Growing Up in America	Morley Markson	
1989; 10th Genie Awards	A Rustling of Leaves: Inside the Philippine Revolution	Nettie Wild	
1989; 10th Genie Awards	Witnesses: The Untold War in Afghanistan	Martyn Burke, David M. Ostriker	

== 1990s ==
Year	Film	Filmmakers	Ref
1990; 11th Genie Awards
1990; 11th Genie Awards	Strand: Under the Dark Cloth	John Walker	
1990; 11th Genie Awards	The Devil's Hole (Le Trou du diable)	Richard Lavoie, François Dupuis, Marc Daigle	
1990; 11th Genie Awards	White Lake	Colin Browne	
1991; 12th Genie Awards
1991; 12th Genie Awards	The Famine Within	Katherine Gilday	
1991; 12th Genie Awards	Au chic resto pop	Éric Michel	
1991; 12th Genie Awards	The Falls	Michael McMahon, Brian Dennis	
1992; 13th Genie Awards
1992; 13th Genie Awards	Deadly Currents	Ric Esther Bienstock, Simcha Jacobovici, Elliott Halpern	
1992; 13th Genie Awards	The Steak (Le Steak)	Manon Leriche, Pierre Falardeau	
1992; 13th Genie Awards	Wisecracks	Gail Singer, Signe Johansson	
1993; 14th Genie Awards
1993; 14th Genie Awards	Forbidden Love: The Unashamed Stories of Lesbian Lives	Lynne Fernie, Aerlyn Weissman	
1993; 14th Genie Awards	A Childhood in Natashquan (Une enfance à Natashquan)	Yvon Provost	
1993; 14th Genie Awards	Stepping Razor: Red X	Edgar Egger, Nicholas Campbell	
1993; 14th Genie Awards	Titanica	Stephen Low	
1993; 14th Genie Awards	The Twist	Ron Mann	
1994; 15th Genie Awards
1994; 15th Genie Awards	In the Gutter and Other Good Places	Cristine Richey	
1994; 15th Genie Awards	André Mathieu, musicien	Jean-Claude Labrecque, Micheline Blais	
1994; 15th Genie Awards	Fat Chance	Joseph MacDonald, Charles Konowal	
1994; 15th Genie Awards	Folk Art Found Me	Alex Busby, Mike Mahoney	
1994; 15th Genie Awards	Kanehsatake: 270 Years of Resistance	Alanis Obomsawin, Wolf Koenig	
1995; 16th Genie Awards
1995; 16th Genie Awards	The Champagne Safari	George Ungar	
1995; 16th Genie Awards	Motherland: Tales of Wonder	Helene Klodawsky, Signe Johansson	
1995; 16th Genie Awards	Narmada: A Valley Rises	Ali Kazimi	
1995; 16th Genie Awards	Silent Witness	Harriet Wichin, Christine York	
1995; 16th Genie Awards	Who's Counting? Marilyn Waring on Sex, Lies and Global Economics	Kent Martin, Terre Nash	
1996; 17th Genie Awards
1996; 17th Genie Awards	Bones of the Forest	Heather Frise, Velcrow Ripper	
1996; 17th Genie Awards	My Life Is a River (Une vie comme rivière)	Diane Cailhier, Alain Chartrand	
1996; 17th Genie Awards	Power	Magnus Isacsson	
1996; 17th Genie Awards	Project Grizzly	Peter Lynch	
1997; 18th Genie Awards
1997; 18th Genie Awards	Tu as crié Let Me Go	Anne Claire Poirier, Paul Lapointe, Joanne Carrière	
1997; 18th Genie Awards	Drowning in Dreams	Michael Allder, Tim Southam	
1997; 18th Genie Awards	Erotica: A Journey Into Female Sexuality	Julia Sereny, Maya Gallus	
1998; 19th Genie Awards
1998; 19th Genie Awards	A Place Called Chiapas	Betsy Carson, Kirk Tougas, Nettie Wild	
1998; 19th Genie Awards	The Herd	Peter Lynch, Peter Starr	
1998; 19th Genie Awards	Let It Come Down: The Life of Paul Bowles	Jennifer Baichwal, Nicholas de Pencier	
1999; 20th Genie Awards
1999; 20th Genie Awards	Just Watch Me: Trudeau and the '70s Generation	Gerry Flahive, Catherine Annau, Yves Bisaillon	
1999; 20th Genie Awards	Quest for the Lost Tribes	Simcha Jacobovici, Elliott Halpern	
1999; 20th Genie Awards	Tops & Bottoms: Sex, Power and Sadomasochism	Cristine Richey	

== 2000s ==
Year	Film	Filmmakers	Ref
2000; 21st Genie Awards
2000; 21st Genie Awards	Grass	Ron Mann	
2000; 21st Genie Awards	Cinéma Vérité: Defining the Moment	Éric Michel, Adam Symansky, Peter Wintonick	
2000; 21st Genie Awards	The Fairy Faith	John Walker, Kent Martin	
2000; 21st Genie Awards	Rocks at Whiskey Trench	Alanis Obomsawin	
2000; 21st Genie Awards	Spirits of Havana	Bay Weyman, Peter Starr, Luis O. Garcia	
2001; 22nd Genie Awards
2001; 22nd Genie Awards	Westray	Paul Cowan	
2001; 22nd Genie Awards	Obāchan's Garden	Selwyn Jacob, Linda Ohama	
2002; 23rd Genie Awards
2002; 23rd Genie Awards	Gambling, Gods and LSD	Ingrid Veninger, Peter Mettler, Alexandra Gill, Cornelia Seitler	
2002; 23rd Genie Awards	Is the Crown at War with Us?	Alanis Obomsawin	
2002; 23rd Genie Awards	The Ring Within (Le ring intérieur)	Éric Michel, Dan Bigras	
2003; 24th Genie Awards
2003; 24th Genie Awards	FIX: The Story of an Addicted City	Betsy Carson, Nettie Wild	
2003; 24th Genie Awards	Go Further	Ron Mann	
2003; 24th Genie Awards	The Last Round: Chuvalo vs. Ali	Silva Basmajian, Joseph Blasioli	
2004; 25th Genie Awards
2004; 25th Genie Awards	The Corporation	Mark Achbar, Jennifer Abbott, Bart Simpson	
2004; 25th Genie Awards	Mr. Mergler's Gift	Beverly Shaffer, Germaine Wong	
2004; 25th Genie Awards	What Remains of Us (Ce qu'il reste de nous)	François Prevost, Yves Bisaillon, Hugo Latulippe	
2005; 26th Genie Awards
2005; 26th Genie Awards	Scared Sacred	Velcrow Ripper, Tracey Friesen, Cari Green, Harry Sutherland	
2005; 26th Genie Awards	Thieves of Innocence (Les Voleurs d'enfance)	Paul Arcand, Denise Robert	
2006; 27th Genie Awards
2006; 27th Genie Awards	Manufactured Landscapes	Jennifer Baichwal, Nicholas de Pencier, Gerry Flahive, Daniel Iron, Peter Starr	
2006; 27th Genie Awards	The White Planet (La Planète Blanche)	Jean Lemire, Thierry Piantanida, Thierry Ragobert	
2007; 28th Genie Awards
2007; 28th Genie Awards	Radiant City	Gary Burns, Jim Brown, Bonnie Thompson, Shirley Vercruysse	
2007; 28th Genie Awards	Antlers (Panache)	André-Line Beauparlant, Danielle Leblanc	
2007; 28th Genie Awards	Sharkwater	Rob Stewart	
2008; 29th Genie Awards
2008; 29th Genie Awards	Up the Yangtze	Yung Chang, Mila Aung-Thwin, John Christou, Germaine Ying-Gee Wong	
2008; 29th Genie Awards	Forever Quebec (Infiniment Québec)	Jean-Claude Labrecque, Yves Fortin, Christian Medawar	
2008; 29th Genie Awards	My Winnipeg	Guy Maddin, Phyllis Laing, Jody Shapiro	
2009; 30th Genie Awards
2009; 30th Genie Awards	A Hard Name	Kristina McLaughlin, Michael McMahon, Alan Zweig	
2009; 30th Genie Awards	Inside Hana's Suitcase	Larry Weinstein, Rudolf Biermann, Jessica Daniel	
2009; 30th Genie Awards	Ladies in Blue (Les dames en bleu)	Claude Demers	
2009; 30th Genie Awards	Prom Night in Mississippi	Patricia Aquino, Paul Saltzman	
2009; 30th Genie Awards	RiP: A Remix Manifesto	Mila Aung-Thwin, Kat Baulu, Brett Gaylor, Germaine Ying-Gee Wong	

== 2010s ==
Year	Film	Filmmakers	Ref
2010; 31st Genie Awards
2010; 31st Genie Awards	Last Train Home	Lixin Fan, Mila Aung-Thwin, Daniel Cross	
2010; 31st Genie Awards	In the Name of the Family	Shelley Saywell, Deborah Parks	
2010; 31st Genie Awards	Journey's End (La Belle Visite)	Jean-François Caissy	
2010; 31st Genie Awards	Leave Them Laughing	John Zaritsky, Montana Berg	
2010; 31st Genie Awards	You Don't Like the Truth: Four Days Inside Guantanamo	Luc Côté, Patricio Henríquez	
2011; 32nd Genie Awards
2011; 32nd Genie Awards	At Night, They Dance (La nuit, elles dansent)	Isabelle Lavigne, Stéphane Thibault	
2011; 32nd Genie Awards	Beauty Day	Jay Cheel	
2011; 32nd Genie Awards	Family Portrait in Black and White	Julia Ivanova	
2011; 32nd Genie Awards	The Guantanamo Trap	Thomas Wallner	
2011; 32nd Genie Awards	Wiebo's War	David York, Bryn Hughes, Nick Hector	
2012; 1st Canadian Screen Awards
2012; 1st Canadian Screen Awards	Stories We Tell	Sarah Polley, Anita Lee	
2012; 1st Canadian Screen Awards	Alphée of the Stars (Alphée des étoiles)	Eric De Gheldere, Hugo Latulippe, Colette Loumède	
2012; 1st Canadian Screen Awards	Indie Game: The Movie	Lisanne Pajot, James Swirsky	
2012; 1st Canadian Screen Awards	Over My Dead Body	Virginie Dubois, Stéphanie Morissette, Brigitte Poupart	
2012; 1st Canadian Screen Awards	The World Before Her	Ed Barreveld, Nisha Pahuja, Cornelia Principe	
2013; 2nd Canadian Screen Awards
2013; 2nd Canadian Screen Awards	Watermark	Jennifer Baichwal, Edward Burtynsky	
2013; 2nd Canadian Screen Awards	Hi-Ho Mistahey!	Alanis Obomsawin	
2013; 2nd Canadian Screen Awards	My Prairie Home	Chelsea McMullan	
2013; 2nd Canadian Screen Awards	People of a Feather	Joel Heath	
2013; 2nd Canadian Screen Awards	Vanishing Point	Stephen A. Smith, Julia Szucs	
2014; 3rd Canadian Screen Awards
2014; 3rd Canadian Screen Awards	Super Duper Alice Cooper	Sam Dunn, Reginald Harkema, Scot McFadyen	
2014; 3rd Canadian Screen Awards	All That We Make (Fermières)	Annie St-Pierre, Luc Déry, Élaine Hébert, Kim McCraw	
2014; 3rd Canadian Screen Awards	Guidelines (La marche à suivre)	Jean-François Caissy, Johanne Bergeron, Colette Loumède	
2014; 3rd Canadian Screen Awards	Marinoni: The Fire in the Frame	Tony Girardin	
2015; 4th Canadian Screen Awards
2015; 4th Canadian Screen Awards	Hurt	Peter Gentile, Alan Zweig	
2015; 4th Canadian Screen Awards	The Amina Profile	Isabelle Couture, Nathalie Cloutier, Hugo Latulippe, Michel St-Cyr, Guy Villeneuve, Colette Loumède	
2015; 4th Canadian Screen Awards	Hadwin's Judgement	Sasha Snow, Elizabeth Yake, David Allen, David Christensen, Yves J. Ma, Tracey Friesen	
2015; 4th Canadian Screen Awards	How to Change the World	Jerry Rothwell, Al Morrow, Bous De Jong, John Murray, Jonny Persey, Stewart Le Maréchal, David Nicholas Wilkinson, John Brunton, Barbara Bowlby	
2015; 4th Canadian Screen Awards	Last of the Elephant Men	Daniel Ferguson, Arnaud Bouquet, Ian Oliveri, Ian Quenneville, Nathalie Barton, Karim Samai, Laurent Mini	
2016; 5th Canadian Screen Awards
2016; 5th Canadian Screen Awards	I Am the Blues	Daniel Cross, Bob Moore, Mila Aung-Thwin, Bruce Cowley	
2016; 5th Canadian Screen Awards	Gulîstan, Land of Roses	Zaynê Akyol, Fanny Drew, Sarah Mannering, Yanick Létourneau, Mehmet Aktas, Denis McCready	
2016; 5th Canadian Screen Awards	Koneline: Our Land Beautiful	Nettie Wild, Betsy Carson	
2016; 5th Canadian Screen Awards	The Prison in Twelve Landscapes	Brett Story	
2016; 5th Canadian Screen Awards	Waseskun	Steve Patry, Nathalie Cloutier, Denis McCready, Colette Loumède	
2017; 6th Canadian Screen Awards
2017; 6th Canadian Screen Awards	Rumble: The Indians Who Rocked the World	Catherine Bainbridge, Christina Fon, Linda Ludwick, Lisa Roth, Stevie Salas, Tim Johnson, Diana Holtzberg, Jan Rofekamp, Ernest Webb	
2017; 6th Canadian Screen Awards	Manic	Kalina Bertin, Marina Serrao, Bob Moore, Mila Aung-Thwin, Daniel Cross	
2017; 6th Canadian Screen Awards	A Moon of Nickel and Ice (Sur la lune de nickel)	Christine Falco, François Jacob, Vuk Stojanovic	
2017; 6th Canadian Screen Awards	Resurrecting Hassan	Carlo Guillermo Proto, Roxanne Sayegh, Pablo Villegas, Maria Paz Gonzalez	
2017; 6th Canadian Screen Awards	Unarmed Verses	Charles Officer, Lea Marin	
2018; 7th Canadian Screen Awards
2018; 7th Canadian Screen Awards	Anthropocene: The Human Epoch	Jennifer Baichwal, Nicholas de Pencier, Edward Burtynsky	
2018; 7th Canadian Screen Awards	The Devil's Share (La Part du diable)	Colette Loumède, Luc Bourdon	
2018; 7th Canadian Screen Awards	Immaculate Memories: The Uncluttered Worlds of Christopher Pratt	Kenneth J. Harvey	
2018; 7th Canadian Screen Awards	Letter from Masanjia	Leon Lee	
2018; 7th Canadian Screen Awards	What Walaa Wants	Christy Garland, Matt Code, Anne Köhncke, Justine Pimlott, Anita Lee	
2019; 8th Canadian Screen Awards
2019; 8th Canadian Screen Awards	Nîpawistamâsowin: We Will Stand Up	Tasha Hubbard, George Hupka, Jon Montes, Bonnie Thompson, Kathy Avrich-Johnson, David Christensen, Janice Dawe	
2019; 8th Canadian Screen Awards	Alexander Odyssey (Alexandre le fou)	Pedro Pires	
2019; 8th Canadian Screen Awards	Gordon Lightfoot: If You Could Read My Mind	Martha Kehoe, Joan Tosoni, John Brunton, John Murray, Gary Slaight, Allan Slaight	
2019; 8th Canadian Screen Awards	Invisible Essence: The Little Prince	Gordon Henderson, Michael A. Levine, Michel St. Cyr, Guy Villeneuve, Stuart Henderson, Jake Yanowski, Mathieu Amadei, Charles Officer	
2019; 8th Canadian Screen Awards	Prey	Matt Gallagher, Cornelia Principe	

== 2020s ==
Year	Film	Producers	Ref
2020; 9th Canadian Screen Awards
2020; 9th Canadian Screen Awards	Wandering: A Rohingya Story (Errance sans retour)	Mélanie Carrier, Olivier Higgins	
2020; 9th Canadian Screen Awards	The Forbidden Reel	Ariel Nasr, Sergeo Kirby, Kat Baulu, Annette Clarke	
2020; 9th Canadian Screen Awards	Stateless	Michèle Stephenson, Jennifer Holness, Lea Marin, Anita Lee, Joe Brewster, Sudz Sutherland	
2020; 9th Canadian Screen Awards	A Woman, My Mother (Une femme, ma mère)	Claude Demers	
2020; 9th Canadian Screen Awards	The World Is Bright	Ying Wang, Jian Ping Su, Jordan Paterson	
2021; 10th Canadian Screen Awards
2021; 10th Canadian Screen Awards	Kímmapiiyipitssini: The Meaning of Empathy	Elle-Máijá Tailfeathers, David Christensen, Lori Lozinski	
2021; 10th Canadian Screen Awards	Captive	Mellissa Fung, Stuart Coxe	
2021; 10th Canadian Screen Awards	My Tree	Jason Sherman, Sonya Di Rienzo, Aeschylus Poulos, Matt Code	
2021; 10th Canadian Screen Awards	One of Ours	Yasmine Mathurin, Laura Perlumutter, Jennifer Kawaja, Andrew Nicholas McCann Smith	
2021; 10th Canadian Screen Awards	Prayer for a Lost Mitten (Prière pour une mitaine perdue)	Jean-François Lesage	
2022; 11th Canadian Screen Awards
2022; 11th Canadian Screen Awards	To Kill a Tiger	Nisha Pahuja, Cornelia Principe, David Oppenheim, Anita Lee, Atul Gawande	
2022; 11th Canadian Screen Awards	Batata	Paul Scherzer, Noura Kevorkian	
2022; 11th Canadian Screen Awards	Dear Audrey	Jeremiah Hayes, André Barro, Annette Clarke	
2022; 11th Canadian Screen Awards	Handle With Care: The Legend of the Notic Streetball Crew	Joey Haywood, Ryan Sidhoo, Jeremy Schaulin-Rioux, Kirk Thomas, Aron Phillips, Matt Aronson, Mark Starkey, Mario Soriano, Lizzy Karp	
2022; 11th Canadian Screen Awards	Zo Reken	Emanuel Licha	
2023; 12th Canadian Screen Awards
2023; 12th Canadian Screen Awards	Twice Colonized	Lin Alluna, Stacey Aglok Macdonald, Alethea Arnaquq-Baril, Emile Hertling Péronard, Bob Moore	
2023; 12th Canadian Screen Awards	Beyond Paper (Au-delà du papier)	Oana Suteu Khintirian, Nathalie Cloutier	
2023; 12th Canadian Screen Awards	Kite Zo A: Leave the Bones	Kaveh Nabatian	
2023; 12th Canadian Screen Awards	The Longest Goodbye	Paul Cadieux, Ido Mizrahy, Nir Sa'ar	
2023; 12th Canadian Screen Awards	Someone Lives Here	Zack Russell, Matt King, Andrew Ferguson, Marianna Khoury, Will Goldbloom, Tinu Sinha, Will Lomoro	
2024; 13th Canadian Screen Awards
2024; 13th Canadian Screen Awards	Yintah	Jennifer Wickham, Brenda Michell, Michael Toledano, Bob Moore, Sam Vinal, Doris Rosso, Daniel Cross, Mila Aung-Thwin	
2024; 13th Canadian Screen Awards	Analogue Revolution: How Feminist Media Changed the World	Marusya Bociurkiw, Eponine Young	
2024; 13th Canadian Screen Awards	Disco's Revenge	Peter Mishara, Omar Majeed, Christina Piovesan, Noah Segal, Sam Sutherland, Dave Harris, Nile Rodgers, Vivian Scott Chew, Stanley Nelson Jr.	
2024; 13th Canadian Screen Awards	Okurimono	Laurence Lévesque, Rosalie Chicoine Perreault, Catherine Boily	
2024; 13th Canadian Screen Awards	Wilfred Buck	Lisa Jackson, Lauren Grant, Alicia Smith, Jennifer Baichwal, Nicholas de Pencier, David Christensen	
2025; 14th Canadian Screen Awards
2025; 14th Canadian Screen Awards	Endless Cookie	Seth Scriver, Peter Scriver, Daniel Bekerman, Alex Ordanis, Chris Yurkovich, Jason Ryle, Neil Mathieson	
2025; 14th Canadian Screen Awards	James Bay 1975: The Shock of Two Nations (Baie James 1975 : le choc des nations)	Marie-Pierre Corriveau, Karine Dubois, Ernest Webb, Catherine Bainbridge, Myriam Berthelet, Mathieu Fournier, Mélanie Lameboy, Archita Ghosh, Daniel Morin	
2025; 14th Canadian Screen Awards	Lilith Fair: Building a Mystery	Dan Levy, Ally Pankiw, Christina Piovesan, Noah Segal	
2025; 14th Canadian Screen Awards	Spare My Bones, Coyote! (Mais où va-t-on, coyote?)	Dominique Dussault, Jonah Malak	
2025; 14th Canadian Screen Awards	The Track	Ryan Sidhoo, Graham Withers	

== See also ==
- Prix Iris for Best Documentary Film
