= 9th Genie Awards =

1988 Canadian film awards

- Date: March 22, 1988
- Site: Metro Toronto Convention Centre; Toronto, Ontario
- Hosted by: Megan Follows, Gordon Pinsent

Highlights
- Best Picture: Night Zoo (Un zoo la nuit)
- Most awards: Night Zoo (13)
- Most nominations: Night Zoo (14)

Television coverage
- Network: CBC Television

The 9th annual Genie Awards were held March 22, 1988, and honoured Canadian films released in 1987. The ceremony, which was broadcast live on CBC Television, was held at the Metro Toronto Convention Centre and co-hosted by actors Megan Follows and Gordon Pinsent.

This was the year in which, for the first time, all of the Best Motion Picture nominees had been written by their directors. The awards were dominated by Jean-Claude Lauzon's Night Zoo (Un zoo la nuit) which garnered 14 nominations and won an unmatched thirteen awards.

The other star of the night was Patricia Rozema's I've Heard the Mermaids Singing, which won in both of the female acting categories and was the only other narrative feature film besides Night Zoo to win any awards. Sheila McCarthy, in her acceptance speech for Best Actress, quipped that "I'm really glad there are no nominations for actresses for Night Zoo." McCarthy, who had just given birth to a daughter a few weeks earlier, was also presented with a miniaturized toy Genie statuette for her baby.

The Special Achievement award was presented to Norman Jewison, for his work in establishing the Canadian Centre for Advanced Film Studies.

== Winners and nominees ==
Motion Picture	Direction
Night Zoo (Un zoo la nuit) — Roger Frappier, Pierre Gendron; Family Viewing — Atom Egoyan; I've Heard the Mermaids Singing — Patricia Rozema, Alexandra Raffe; Life Classes — Stephen Reynolds; Train of Dreams — Sam Grana	Jean-Claude Lauzon, Night Zoo (Un zoo la nuit); Atom Egoyan, Family Viewing; Marquise Lepage, Marie in the City (Marie s'en va-t-en ville); Patricia Rozema, I've Heard the Mermaids Singing; John N. Smith, Train of Dreams
Actor in a leading role	Actress in a leading role
Roger Lebel, Night Zoo (Un zoo la nuit); David Hemblen, Family Viewing; Gilles Maheu, Night Zoo (Un zoo la nuit); Jason St. Amour, Train of Dreams	Sheila McCarthy, I've Heard the Mermaids Singing; Frédérique Collin, Marie in the City (Marie s'en va-t-en ville); Jacinta Cormier, Life Classes; Kate Lynch, Taking Care; Gabrielle Rose, Family Viewing
Actor in a supporting role	Actress in a supporting role
Germain Houde, Night Zoo (Un zoo la nuit); Hrant Alianak, Family Viewing; Leon Dubinsky, Life Classes; Tony Nardi, Concrete Angels; Murray Westgate, Blue City Slammers	Paule Baillargeon, I've Heard the Mermaids Singing; Jayne Eastwood, Night Friend; Fran Gebhard, Blue City Slammers; Ann-Marie MacDonald, I've Heard the Mermaids Singing; Maruska Stankova, Dreams Beyond Memory
Documentary	Best Short Film
God Rides a Harley — Stavros C. Stavrides, Andreas Erne; The Canneries — Stephen Insley, Bonni Devlin; Dance for Modern Times — Moze Mossanen; Elephant Dreams — Martha Davis; To Hurt and to Heal — Laura Sky	George and Rosemary — David Fine, Alison Snowden; Fashion 99 — Karen Firus; Future Block — Kevin McCracken
Art Direction/Production Design	Cinematography
Jean-Baptiste Tard, Night Zoo (Un zoo la nuit); Violette Daneau, The Great Land of Small (C'est pas parce qu'on est petit qu'on peut pas être grand!); Ronald Fauteux, Brother André (Le Frère André); François Séguin, Marie in the City (Marie s'en va-t-en ville)	Guy Dufaux, Night Zoo (Un zoo la nuit); Michel Brault, The Great Land of Small (C'est pas parce qu'on est petit qu'on peut pas être grand!); Douglas Koch, I've Heard the Mermaids Singing; Richard Leiterman, The Climb
Costume Design	Editing
Andrée Morin, Night Zoo (Un zoo la nuit); Michèle Hamel, The Great Land of Small (C'est pas parce qu'on est petit qu'on peut pas être grand!); Denis Sperdouklis, Brother André (Le Frère André); Nicole Pelletier, Marie in the City (Marie s'en va-t-en ville); Alexandra Z and Martine Matthews, I've Heard the Mermaids Singing	Michel Arcand, Night Zoo (Un zoo la nuit); Atom Egoyan and Bruce MacDonald, Family Viewing
Overall Sound	Sound Editing
Adrian Croll, Hans Peter Strobl and Yvon Benoît, Night Zoo (Un zoo la nuit); David Appleby and Dan Latour, Too Outrageous!; Michel Charron, Jo Caron, André Gagnon and Michel Descombes, The Young Magician (Le jeune magicien); Michelle Moses, Egidio Coccimiglio and Gordon Thompson, I've Heard the Mermaids Singing; Tony Van den Akker, Marvin Bearns and Lars Ekstrom, Hello Mary Lou: Prom Night II	Viateur Paiement, Marcel Pothier and Diane Boucher, Night Zoo (Un zoo la nuit); Diane Boucher, Viateur Paiement, Marcel Pothier, Jo Caron and Antoine Morin, Brother André (Le Frère André); Robin Leigh, Richard Cadger, Jane Tattersall, Penny Hozy and Peter McBurnie, The Climb; Peter McBurnie, Marta Nielsen Sternberg, Peter Thilaye, Nick Rotundo and Peter Jermyn, Hello Mary Lou: Prom Night II; Viateur Paiement, Serge Viau, Alain Clavier, Claude Langlois and Louise Coté, The Young Magician (Le jeune magicien)
Achievement in Music: Original Score	Achievement in Music: Original Song
Jean Corriveau, Night Zoo (Un zoo la nuit); Patricia Cullen, The Care Bears Adventure in Wonderland; Mychael Danna, Family Viewing; Tim McCauley, Blue City Slammers	Jean-Pierre Bonin, Daniel De Shaimes, Jean Corriveau and Robert Stanley, "Lost in a Hurricane" — Night Zoo (Un zoo la nuit); Howard Forman and Krzesimir Dębski, "When We're Together" — The Young Magician (Le jeune magicien); William D. MacGillivray, "Mary's Lament" — Life Classes; Maribeth Solomon, "Rise and Shine" — The Care Bears Adventure in Wonderland; Guy Trépanier, "The Great Land of Small" — The Great Land of Small (C'est pas parce qu'on est petit qu'on peut pas être grand!)
Screenplay	Special awards
Jean-Claude Lauzon, Night Zoo (Un zoo la nuit); Atom Egoyan, Family Viewing; Sam Grana, John N. Smith and Sally Bochner, Train of Dreams; William D. MacGillivray, Life Classes; Patricia Rozema, I've Heard the Mermaids Singing	Golden Reel Award: The Gate; Special Achievement: Norman Jewison; Air Canada Award: Rock Demers
