= Tales for All =

Film series

Tales for All (French: Contes pour tous) is a series of children and family films produced by the company Les Productions la Fête. These films were also published as books. The series was officially launched in 1984, although it retroactively incorporated one film that founder Rock Demers had previously produced in the 1970s.

Filmmaker Dominic James acquired Productions La Fête from Demers in 2015, and began releasing new films in the Tales for All series in the 2020s.

== List of titles ==
The films are also referred as Tales for All #1, Tales for All #2, etc.

#	Title (English, French)	Released in	Director	Paperback Book	Notes #
0	The Christmas Martian; Le Martien de Nöel	1971	Bernard Gosselin	ISBN 2-89037-569-2 (French)	
1	The Dog Who Stopped the War; La guerre des tuques	1984	André Melançon	ISBN 0-88899-040-5 (English); ISBN 2-89037-220-0 (French)	
2	The Peanut Butter Solution; Opération beurre de pinottes	1985	Michael Rubbo	ISBN 2-89037-287-1 (English); ISBN 2-89037-278-2 (French)	
3	Bach and Broccoli; Bach et Bottine	1986	André Melançon	ISBN 2-92094-801-6 (English); ISBN 2-89037-313-4 (French)	
4	The Young Magician; Le jeune magicien	1987	Waldemar Dziki	ISBN 2-92094-800-8 (English); ISBN 2-89037-322-3 (French)	Co-production with Poland (title: Cudowne dziecko)
5	The Great Land of Small; C'est pas parce qu'on est petit qu'on peut pas être grand	1987	Vojtěch Jasný	ISBN 2-92094-802-4 (English); ISBN 2-89037-370-3 (French)	
6	Tadpole and the Whale; La grenouille et la baleine	1987	Jean-Claude Lord	ISBN 2-92094-804-0 (English); ISBN 2-89037-392-4 (French)	
7	Tommy Tricker and the Stamp Traveller; Les aventuriers du timbre perdu	1988	Michael Rubbo	ISBN 2-92094-805-9 (English); ISBN 2-89037-427-0 (French)	
8	Summer of the Colt; Fierro... l'été des secrets	1989	André Melançon	ISBN 2-92094-806-7 (English); ISBN 2-89037-466-1 (French)	Co-production with Argentina Original title in Spanish: El verano del potro
9	Bye Bye Red Riding Hood; Bye bye chaperon rouge	1989	Márta Mészáros	ISBN 2-92094-808-3 (English); ISBN 2-89037-486-6 (French)	Co-production with Hungary
10	The Case of the Witch Who Wasn't; Pas de répit pour Mélanie	1990	Jean Beaudry	ISBN 2-89037-498-X (French)	
11	Vincent and Me; Vincent et moi	1990	Michael Rubbo	ISBN 2-89037-520-X (French)	Co-production with France
12	Reach for the Sky; La championne	1990	Elisabeta Bostan	ISBN 2-89037-542-0 (French)	Co-production with Romania
13	The Clean Machine; Tirelire, combines & Cie	1992	Jean Beaudry	ISBN 2-89037-586-2 (French)	
14	The Flying Sneaker; Danger Pleine Lune	1990	Bretislav Pojar	ISBN 2-89037-648-6 (French)	Co-production with Czechoslovakia Original title in Czech: "Motýlí cas"
15	The Return of Tommy Tricker; Le retour des aventuriers du timbre perdu	1994	Michael Rubbo	ISBN 2-89037-683-4 (French)	
15A	Whiskers; Moustaches	1997	Jim Kaufman		
16	Dancing on the Moon; Viens danser... sur la lune!	1997	Kit Hood	ISBN 2-89037-823-3 (French)	
16A	Hathi; Hathi	1998	Philippe Gautier		
17	The Hidden Fortress; La forteresse suspendue	2001	Roger Cantin	ISBN 2-76440-100-0 (English); ISBN 2-84596-050-6 (French)	
18	My Little Devil; Mon petit diable	2000	Gopi Desai	ISBN 2-76440-195-7 (French)	
19	Regina; Régina!	2002	María Sigurðardóttir	ISBN 2-76440-194-9 (French)	Co-production with Iceland
20	Summer with the Ghosts; Un été avec les fantômes	2004	Bernd Neuburger	ISBN 2-76440-241-4 (French)	Co-production with Austria
21	Daniel and the Superdogs; Daniel et les Superdogs	2004	André Melançon	ISBN 2-76440-382-8 (French)	
	A Cargo to Africa; Un cargo pour l'Afrique	2009	Roger Cantin		
24	The Outlaw League; La gang des hors-la-loi	2014	Jean Beaudry	ISBN 2-76442-701-8 (French)	
25	Coco Farm; Coco ferme	2023	Sébastien Gagné		
26	Miss Boots; Mlle Bottine	2024	Yan Lanouette Turgeon		
27	My Stepmother Is a Witch (Ma belle-mère est une sorcière)	2025	Joëlle Desjardins Paquette		

== DVD Box Sets ==
In December 2005, Rock Demers announced that films from the Contes Pour Tous series would be released in DVD box sets in Canada through Imavision. The box sets included special features, but did not contain English audio or subtitle options.

=== Coffret Collection 1 ===
Coffret Collection 1 (Box Set #1) was bundled with a bonus CD of ten songs from the films, only available through Imavision's website. Released September 26, 2006 - UPC 069458169332

- La guerre des tuques
- Fierro... l'été des secrets
- Régina
- C'est pas parce qu'on est petit qu'on peut pas être grand!
- Bach et Bottine
- Mon petit diable

=== Coffret Collection 2 ===
Box Set #2, released April 10, 2007 - UPC 069458186834

- La grenouille et la baleine
- Bye Bye, Chaperon Rouge
- Danger Pleine Lune
- Vincent et moi
- La Championne
- Le Jeune Magicien

=== Coffret Collection 3 ===
Coffret Collection 3 (Box Set #3) includes a set of books to correspond with the DVDs. Released August 21, 2007 - UPC 069458187435

- Le martien de Noël
- Opération beurre de pinotes
- Les aventuriers du timbre perdu
- Le retour des aventuriers du timbre perdu
- Pas de répit pour Mélanie
- Tirelire combines & cie

=== Coffret Collection 4 ===
Box Set #4, released March 16, 2010 - UPC 069458267038

- Viens danser... sur la lune
- La forteresse suspendue
- Un cargo pour l'Afrique
- Maman, mon éléphant et moi
- Hathi
- Moustaches
