= Jake and the Kid =

Short story collection based on radio series by W. O. Mitchell

- Short story by W. O. Mitchell
- First edition
- Country: Canada
- Language: English

Publication
- Publisher: Macmillan Canada
- Publication date: 1961

Jake and the Kid is a collection of short stories by W. O. Mitchell, published in 1961. Many stories in the series appeared in Maclean's prior to the book's publication. The stories stem from Mitchell's long-running radio series of the same name. Mitchell also published a sequel volume, According to Jake and the Kid, in 1989.

== Overview ==
Set in the 1940s and 1950s, "The Kid" is at the centre of stories of a boy on a farm in fictional Crocus, Saskatchewan, Canada. Jake is the hired hand who helps the Kid's mother run the farm who now keeps the Kid abreast of events in the greater world and in Crocus.

The Kid's teacher, Miss Henchbaw, is unfairly dismissed by the school board until her friends fight back in the story "Will of the People"; Chet Lambert of the Crocus Breeze is hauled into court for comparing George Solway with Malleable Brown's goat in "The Face Is Familiar," resulting in a courtroom confrontation unrivalled in the history of Canadian jurisprudence; and "Political Dynamite" shows the men terrified by women curlers threatening to vote en bloc in the upcoming town election.

The town is rich not only in disputes but characters, from Repeat Golightly in the barbershop to Old Man Sherry, the town's oldest inhabitant. Throughout the series of stories, many entertainers come through town: Belva Taskey, the sweet songstress ("Lo! The Noble Redskin!") and her memorable poetry reading; The Great Doctor Suhzee, the hypnotist; and Professor Noble Winesinger, whose snake-oil remedies had been known to turn his customers black.

== Adaptations ==
=== Radio ===
Mitchell began to write the Jake and the Kid radio series for CBC Radio in 1950. The radio series continued until 1956 with over 300 episodes produced.

=== Television ===
Two television adaptations have been produced, the 1961 Jake and The Kid for CBC Television, starring Murray Westgate as Jake and Rex Hagon as Ben, and the 1995 Jake and the Kid for Global with Shaun Johnston as Jake and Ben Campbell as Ben.

== Awards ==
The book won the Stephen Leacock Award in 1962.
