= The Inquiry Film: A Report on the Mackenzie Valley Pipeline =

- Directed by: Jesse Nishihata
- Produced by: Arthur Pape
- Distributed by: CBC Television
- Release date: 1977
- Running time: 87 minutes
- Country: Canada
- Language: English

The Inquiry Film: A Report on the Mackenzie Valley Pipeline is a Canadian documentary film, directed by Jesse Nishihata and released in 1977. The film explored the First Nations perspective on Thomas R. Berger's Mackenzie Valley Pipeline Inquiry of the mid-1970s.

CBC Television aired the film in its entirety the day before the release of Berger's report, one of the first times that it ever broadcast a documentary film which it had not exercised direct editorial control during the filmmaking process.

The film won the Canadian Film Award for Best Feature Length Documentary in 1977.
