= Coco Farm =

- French: Coco ferme
- Directed by: Sébastien Gagné
- Written by: Dominic James; Jacques Desjardins
- Produced by: Antonello Cozzolino; Dominic James; Brigitte Léveillé; Vindhya Sagar
- Starring: Oscar Desgagnés; Joey Bélanger; Emma Bao Linh Tourné; Benoît Brière; Simon Lacroix
- Cinematography: Simon Villeneuve
- Edited by: François Larochelle
- Music by: Philippe Brault
- Production company: Les Productions La Fête
- Distributed by: Quebecor Films
- Release date: February 24, 2023
- Running time: 87 minutes
- Country: Canada
- Language: Quebec French

Coco Farm (French: Coco ferme) is a Canadian children's comedy film, directed by Sébastien Gagné and released in 2023.

The 25th film in the long-running Tales for All (Contes pour tous) series of children's films and the first new film in the series to be released since Dominic James acquired the Productions la Fête studio from founder Rock Demers in 2015, the film stars Oscar Desgagnés as Max, a young boy who moves to a small town with his father Éric (Simon Lacroix) after the death of his mother; initially unhappy with his new reality, Max soon joins with his cousin Charles (Joey Bélanger) and classmate Alice (Emma Bao Linh Tourné) in a bid to reverse the family's fortunes by acquiring 500 chickens to launch an egg farm.

The cast also includes Benoît Brière, Mia Garnier, Louis-Philippe Dandenault, Joëlle Paré-Beaulieu, Richard Fréchette, Steve Laplante, Pierre Mailloux and Vincent Bolduc.

The film was shot in and around Frelighsburg, Quebec. It opened in theatres on February 24, 2023.

The film won the Golden Slipper for best children's film at the 2024 Zlín Film Festival.
