= Michał Szewczyk =

Michał Szewczyk may refer to:

- Michał Szewczyk (footballer)
- Michał Szewczyk (actor)
