= Matusalem (film) =

1993 Canadian children's adventure film

- Film poster
- Directed by: Roger Cantin
- Written by: Roger Cantin
- Produced by: Claude Bonin
- Starring: Marc Labrèche; Émile Proulx-Cloutier
- Cinematography: Michel Caron
- Edited by: Yves Langlois
- Music by: Milan Kymlicka
- Production company: Les Films Vision 4
- Release date: 17 December 1993
- Running time: 105 minutes
- Country: Canada
- Language: French

Matusalem is a 1993 Canadian children's adventure film, directed by Roger Cantin. The film stars Marc Labrèche as Philippe de Beauchesne, a long-dead 18th-century pirate who returns to earth as a ghost every 50 years to enlist human assistance in completing the quest that will free his soul, and Émile Proulx-Cloutier as Olivier, a young boy who volunteers for the quest; however, Olivier himself is captured by another group of pirates, and Philippe must join with Olivier's other friends to save him.

The film was promoted in part through a commercial tie-in with McDonald's, the first Canadian film ever sponsored by the fast food chain.

The film received six Genie Award nominations at the 15th Genie Awards in 1994, for Best Original Screenplay (Cantin), Best Art Direction/Production Design (Vianney Gauthier), Best Costume Design (Francesca Chamberland), Best Overall Sound (Louis Hone, Dominique Chartrand, Jacques Drouin and Hans Peter Strobl), Best Sound Editing (Michel B. Bordeleau, Diane Boucher, Natalie Fleurant and Jérôme Décarie) and Best Original Score (Milan Kymlicka).

A sequel, Matusalem II, was released in 1997.
