= Cursed Films =

2020 American documentary miniseries web television series

- Genre: Documentary & miniseries
- Written by: Jay Cheel
- Directed by: Jay Cheel
- Countries of origin: United States, Canada
- Original language: English
- No. of seasons: 2
- No. of episodes: 10

Production
- Executive producers: Brian Robertson; Jonas Prupas; Courtney Dobbins; Andrew Nicholas; McCann Smith; Laura Perlmutter
- Producer: Brian Robertson
- Editor: Jay Cheel
- Running time: 26–29 minutes (2020); 41–46 minutes (2022)
- Production companies: Low End; Muse Entertainment; First Love Films

Original release
- Release: April 2, 2020 – May 5, 2022

Cursed Films is an American television documentary produced by Shudder, a streaming service owned by AMC Networks. Written, edited and directed by Jay Cheel, the series covers alleged instances of curses surrounding films. It premiered April 2, 2020 on Shudder with mixed to positive reviews.

In August 2020, Shudder renewed the series for a second season, which premiered on April 7, 2022.

== Description ==
The documentary series focuses on alleged curses that afflicted the production of notable horror/non-horror films. Each episode focuses on a single film and includes interviews with individuals who worked on said films. The series also includes interviews with journalists and film critics who comment on the alleged curses.

== Episodes ==
=== Series overview ===
Season	Episodes	Originally released	
Season	Episodes	First released	Last released
1	5	April 2, 2020	April 16, 2020
2	5	April 7, 2022	May 5, 2022

=== Season 1 (2020) ===
No. overall	No. in season	Title	Original release date
1	1	"The Exorcist"	April 2, 2020
2	2	"The Omen"	April 9, 2020
3	3	"Poltergeist"	April 9, 2020
4	4	"The Crow"	April 16, 2020
5	5	"Twilight Zone: The Movie"	April 16, 2020

=== Season 2 (2022) ===
No. overall	No. in season	Title	Original release date
6	1	"The Wizard of Oz"	April 7, 2022
7	2	"Rosemary's Baby"	April 14, 2022
8	3	"Stalker"	April 21, 2022
9	4	"The Serpent and the Rainbow"	April 28, 2022
10	5	"Cannibal Holocaust"	May 5, 2022

== See also ==
- Superstitions
- New Hollywood
- Twilight Zone accident
- Urban legends
- Classical Hollywood cinema
- Extreme cinema
- Vulgar auteurism
