= Bernadette Renaud =

Canadian writer

- Born: April 18, 1945 (age 81); Ascot Corner, Québec, Canada
- Occupation: Writer

Bernadette Renaud (born April 18, 1945 in Ascot Corner, Québec) is a Canadian writer living in the Montérégie region of Quebec.

== Biography ==
Bernadette Renaud was born in Ascot Corner, April 18, 1945. She worked in a school library and then taught primary school before becoming a writer full-time. In 1976, she published Émilie la baignoire à pattes, which won a Canada Council Children's Literature Prize and the Prix Alvine-Bélisle. Her 1986 book Bach et bottine was made into a film of the same name; the English version was Bach and Broccoli. The film won eighteen international awards and was awarded a UNESCO Special Award for the International Year of the Family. Renaud wrote the words for a record album Bach et Bottine which received an award for Best Children's LP from ADISQ. She has received the Grand prix littéraire de la Montérégie several times. Some of her work has been translated into English and into Braille.

Renaud wrote scripts for television, including several episodes for the series Klimbo, Michou et Piloo and Watatatow. She also wrote the script for a National Film Board short Quand l'accent devient grave and a children's play Une boîte magique très embêtante.

== Selected works ==
- Le Chat de l'oratoire, youth literature (1978)
- La Maison tête de pioche, youth literature (1979)
- La Révolte de la courtepointe, youth literature (1979), received honourable mention in the youth literature competition of the Association canadienne d'éducation de langue française, republished in 2004 as Drôle de nuit pour Miti
- Un Homme comme tant d'autres, trilogy - adult fiction (1992-1994), received the Prix Germaine-Guévremont
- La Quête de Kurweena, philosophical tale (1997)
- Les Chemins d'Ève, adult fiction - four volumes (2002-2006)
- Les gros bisous, youth literature (2004)
- Perdu dans la brume, novel (2009)
