= Fierce Light =

Fierce Light: When Spirit Meets Action
- Directed by: Velcrow Ripper
- Written by: Velcrow Ripper
- Produced by: Cherilyn Hawrysh; Gerry Flahive
- Starring: Krishna Aratna; Joan Baez; Sera Beak; Michael Beckwith
- Cinematography: Velcrow Ripper
- Edited by: Velcrow Ripper
- Release date: 1 October 2008 (VIFF)
- Running time: 90 minutes
- Country: Canada
- Language: English

Fierce Light: When Spirit Meets Action is a 2008 documentary film written and directed by Velcrow Ripper that focuses on spiritual activism. Fueled by the belief that "another world" is possible, Ripper explores the stories of people who have turned to spiritual activism as a means to cope with personal and global crises. The film contains interviews from Daryl Hannah, Thich Nhat Hanh, Desmond Tutu, Julia Butterfly Hill, Van Jones, Alice Walker, Joanna Macy, Noah Levine and John Lewis. Others featured include Michael Beckwith, Sera Beak, Ralph Nader among many others such as the original inspiration for the film, Brad Will.

The film is produced by the Fiercelight Films Inc. and the National Film Board of Canada and is distributed by Alive Mind. The United Kingdom distributor is Dogwoof Pictures.

== Awards ==
Fierce Light was voted most popular Canadian film and the recipient of a special mention in the nonfiction feature category at the Vancouver International Film Festival.

== See also ==
- Scared Sacred
