= Four Stiffs and a Trombone =

1991 Canadian crime comedy film

- French: L'assassin jouait du trombone
- Directed by: Roger Cantin
- Written by: Roger Cantin
- Produced by: Franco Battista
- Starring: Germain Houde; Raymond Bouchard; Marc Labrèche
- Cinematography: Rodney Gibbons
- Edited by: Yves Langlois
- Music by: Milan Kymlicka
- Production company: Allegro Films
- Release date: September 20, 1991
- Running time: 96 minutes
- Country: Canada
- Language: French

Four Stiffs and a Trombone (French: L'assassin jouait du trombone) is a Canadian crime comedy film, directed by Roger Cantin and released in 1991. The film stars Germain Houde as Augustin Marleau, a nighttime security guard at a film studio who entertains fantasies of being a film noir detective, and becomes involved in a murder investigation when a killer begins murdering employees of the studio.

The cast also includes Marc Labrèche, Raymond Bouchard, Normand Lévesque, Gildor Roy, France Castel, Jean-Pierre Bergeron and Paule Baillargeon.

A sequel film, The Revenge of the Woman in Black (La vengeance de la femme en noir), was released in 1997.
