= Dominic James (producer) =

Canadian filmmaker (born 1976)

Dominic Laurence James (born November 23, 1976) is a Canadian filmmaker, who acquired the Productions La Fête studio in 2015.

The son of actress Claire Pimparé, he began his career as an actor, with small supporting roles in Lance et compte, Naked Josh and I'm Not There, before directing the short film Lotto 6/66 in 2006.

He subsequently directed the feature films Die in 2010, Blind Spot (Angle mort) in 2011, and Wait Till Helen Comes in 2016.

He purchased La Fête from founder Rock Demers in 2015 with plans to revive the studio's Tales for All (Contes pour tous) series of children's films, which had by that time greatly declined in prominence from its highly influential era in the late 1980s and early 1990s.

He officially relaunched the series in 2023 with the film Coco Farm (Coco ferme) in 2023, and followed up in 2024 with Miss Boots (Mlle Bottine), a modernized update of the 1986 Tales for All film Bach and Broccoli (Bach et Bottine). He was a producer and screenwriter, but not the director, of both films.

== Filmography ==
- Lotto 6/66 - 2006, director
- Die - 2010, director
- Blind Spot (Angle mort) - 2011, director
- Wait Till Helen Comes - 2016, director
- Traces of Hope - 2020, producer
- Margot's Sister (La sœur de Margot) - 2022, producer
- Coco Farm (Coco ferme) - 2023, producer and screenwriter
- Miss Boots (Mlle Bottine) - 2024, producer and screenwriter
- My Stepmother Is a Witch (Ma belle-mère est une sorcière) - 2025, producer and screenwriter
