= The Science Alliance (TV series) =

- Presented by: Rex Hagon; Judy Haladay
- No. of episodes: 11

Original release
- Network: TVO
- Release: 1981 – 1982

The Science Alliance is an educational television show which was produced and broadcast by TVOntario in 1981–82. The hosts were Rex Hagon and Judy Haladay.

The typical episode would feature the hosts demonstrating various aspect of the subject of the episode. In addition, a largely unseen narrator named Bryant would interrupt at pertinent points with a vignette called "Bryant's Giants of Science" which would tell the story of a figure in the history of science and his contribution to scientific knowledge.

== Episode list ==
11 episodes were produced. They were:

1. "Magnets"
2. "Electricity"
3. "Matter"
4. "Energy"
5. "Machines"
6. "Heat"
7. "Air"
8. "Sound"
9. "Light"
10. "Water"
11. "Safety"

All episodes were 15 minutes in length.
