= Marc Labrèche =

Canadian actor, comedian and host

- Born: November 20, 1960 (age 65); Montreal, Quebec, Canada
- Occupations: Actor, comedian, TV host

Marc Labrèche CM (born November 20, 1960, in Montreal, Quebec) is a Canadian actor, comedian and host.

== Background ==
The son of Quebec comedian Gaetan Labrèche, Marc Labrèche had an interest in stage acting from his childhood. His career began in live theatre, but Labrèche's television career started in 1980 when he performed in several television shows and soap-operas including his first TV role in Claude Jasmin's Boogie-woogie 47. His first appearance in a movie was in 1987 when he appeared in If Only.

In total, Labrèche has appeared in more than 30 movies and TV series, including Matusalem, Ding et Dong, La Petite Vie, Machine Gun Molly (Monica la mitraille), Alice's Odyssey (L'Odysée d'Alice Tremblay) and Les Bougon. Labrèche had a leading role in Days of Darkness (L'Âge des ténèbres) directed by Denys Arcand. Labrèche has also performed in the French versions of Toy Story and Toy Story II as Slinky, and on The Simpsons as Krusty the Clown since 1994. Labrèche also hosted the TQS humor show, La Fin du monde est à 7 heures from 1997 to 2000, and wrote and hosted the talk show Le Grand Blond avec un show sournois that aired from 2000 until 2003 on TVA. Since 2006, he has hosted Le Fric Show, a late-night consumer show on SRC.

In 2005 Labrèche's wife Fabienne Dor, daughter of the singer George Dor and mother of his two children, died of cancer. Labrèche was deeply shaken by her death, having taken a brief hiatus from his career to care for her, and has worked with the Canadian Cancer Society several times to help raise awareness of the disease.

In February 2015, Labrèche revealed that he was in a relationship with Jennifer Tremblay, a costume designer for the shows 30 vies and Ruptures.

In autumn 2016 Labrèche returned to television after a three-year hiatus with the show Info, sexe et mensonges, and will also be appearing in the Bye Bye (a satirical end-of-year show) for 2016. In the same year, he directed a segment of the collective film 9 (9, le film).

== Awards ==
Labrèche has received several Gemini Awards nominations and awards including for best supporting male interpreter/actor in La Petite Vie in 1993, best host for humour and variety shows in 2000 and 2001, and best male comedy lead in 2006. He also won a Metro Star award in 2002 for best male personality.

== Filmography ==
=== Movies ===
- If Only - 1987
- In the Belly of the Dragon (Dans le ventre du dragon) - 1989
- Ding et Dong - 1990
- Four Stiffs and a Trombone (L'assassin jouait du trombone) - 1991
- Matusalem - 1993
- Streetheart (Le Cœur au poing) - 1996
- Matusalem II (Matusalem 2: le dernier des Beauchesne) - 1997
- The Revenge of the Woman in Black (La vengeance de la femme en noir) - 1997
- Slippery Ice - 1999
- The Little Story of a Man Without a Story (La petite histoire d'un homme sans histoire) - 1999
- Alice's Odyssey (L'Odyssée d'Alice Tremblay) - 2002
- Machine Gun Molly (Monica la mitraille) - 2004
- The United States of Albert (Les États-Unis d'Albert) - 2006
- Days of Darkness (L'Âge des ténèbres) - 2007
- The Child Prodigy (L'Enfant Prodige) - 2010
- Whitewash - 2013
- The Voice (La Voce) - 2015
- 9 (9, le film) - 2016
- The Other Side of November (L'Autre côté de novembre) - 2016
- Felix and the Treasure of Morgäa (Félix et le trésor de Morgäa) - 2021

=== Voice roles (TV and movies) ===
- Histoire de Jouets (Toy Story) - Slinky (1995)
- La Petite Sirene (The Little Mermaid) - Hippocampe (1998)
- Les Simpson (The Simpsons) - Krusty the Clown (1994–2007)
- Détestable Moi (Despicable Me) - Gru (2010)
- Toupie et Binou (Toopy and Binoo) - Toopy (2005)
- Le Grincheux (The Grinch) - Grinch (2018)

=== Television series ===
- Boogie-woogie 47 (1980)
- Chop Suey (1986)
- Qui a tiré sur nos histoires d'amour? (1986)
- Le grand remous (1989)
- La Petite Vie (1993–1999)
- Les Intrépides (1993)
- Les Bougon (2004)
- Le coeur a ses raisons (2005-2007)
- Les Bobos (2012)

=== Host ===
- La fin du monde est à 7 heures (1997–2000)
- Le Grand Blond avec un show sournois (2000–2003)
- Le Fric Show (2006–2007)
- 3600 secondes d'extase (2008–2011)
- 1800 secondes d'extase (2011–2012)
