= Miss Météo =

- Starring: Anne-Marie Cadieux; Patrice Robitaille; Sophie Prégent; Mahée Paiement; Frédéric Pierre; Samuel Landry; Audréanne Carrier
- Country of origin: Canada
- No. of seasons: 2
- No. of episodes: 26

Production
- Executive producers: Christian Larouche; Christian Gagné
- Production locations: Montreal, Quebec
- Running time: 30 minutes

Original release
- Network: Séries+
- Release: January 8, 2008 – October 7, 2009

Miss Météo is a Canadian Quebec French-language television series that airs on Séries+. It is a 30 minute adaptation of the Quebec French language film Miss Météo. The same actors are used in the TV series as were used in the film.

== Storyline ==
Myriam Monette, a nonconformist and slightly whimsical weather presenter, now aged 40, has a new boyfriend and a new role at Channel Météo (also known as Channel M). Although little appears to have changed, her personal circumstances have changed significantly. Monette had previously been single but is now in a relationship and living with her partner.

== Main characters ==
- Myriam Monette (played by Anne-Marie Cadieux): She is Miss Weatherwoman. A woman that we could call an "adulteen".
- François Larivière (played by Patrice Robitaille): The boyfriend of Myriam.
- Brigitte Caron (played by Sophie Prégent): She is the boss of Myriam.
- Josiane Després (played by Mahée Paiement): She is one of the friends of Myriam at Channel M.
