= Fat Chance (film) =

1994 documentary film about fat acceptance directed by Jeff McKay

- Directed by: Jeff McKay
- Written by: Bonnie Dickie
- Produced by: Charles Konowal; Joe MacDonald
- Release date: 1994
- Country: Canada

Fat Chance is a 1994 National Film Board of Canada (NFB) documentary film directed by Jeff McKay about fat acceptance.

== Summary ==
The film focuses on Rick Zakowich, a 40-year-old, 400-pound Winnipeg man who sets out to lose half his body weight, but then decides to accept himself the way he is. The film follows Zakowich's journey to self-acceptance, as he goes on to found a self-help group for large-size men and became an activist for fat acceptance.

== Production ==
Director McKay began on the project in 1990, filming for almost two years and editing for almost three years. Originally planned as a half-hour film, Fat Chance was completed as a 72-minute theatrical documentary, then broadcast in a cutdown version.

The film was written by Bonnie Dickie and produced by Charles Konowal and Joe MacDonald for the NFB.

== Reception ==
Positive reviews for the film included the Toronto Sun, which called it "a work of intense and moving humanity," and the Montreal Mirror, which said "it's really about all obese people who have marked your memory."

The film received seven awards, including a Peabody Award for its TVOntario broadcast and an Achievement Award for outstanding contribution to the advancement of self-respect, dignity, and a better life for fat people, from the National Association to Advance Fat Acceptance. Fat Chance was also nominated for a Genie Award for Best Feature Length Documentary.
