= Dream Life (film) =

- French: La Vie rêvée
- Directed by: Mireille Dansereau
- Written by: Mireille Dansereau; Patrick Auzépy
- Produced by: Guy Bergeron
- Starring: Liliane Lemaître-Auger; Véronique Le Flaguais
- Cinematography: Louis de Ernsted; François Gill; Richard Rodrigue
- Edited by: Danielle Gagné
- Music by: Emmanuel Charpentier
- Production company: ACPAV
- Release date: July 22, 1972
- Running time: 90 minutes
- Country: Canada
- Language: French

Dream Life (French: La Vie rêvée) is a Canadian drama film, directed by Mireille Dansereau and released in 1972. The first narrative fiction feature film from Quebec to be directed by a woman, the film stars Liliane Lemaître-Auger and Véronique Le Flaguais as Isabelle and Virginie, colleagues at a film production company in Montreal, who dream of finding the perfect man but come to realize that reality doesn't live up to their fantasies. It was the first privately produced feature film in Canada to be directed by a woman.

The film won two Canadian Film Awards at the 24th Canadian Film Awards in 1972, for Best Editing (Danielle Gagné) and the Wendy Michener Award.

It was later screened at the 1984 Festival of Festivals as part of Front & Centre, a special retrospective program of artistically and culturally significant films from throughout the history of Canadian cinema.

== Works cited ==
- Marshall, Bill (2001). Quebec National Cinema. McGill–Queen's University Press. ISBN 0-7735-2103-8.
