= The Hidden Fortress (2001 film) =

- French: La Forteresse suspendue
- Directed by: Roger Cantin
- Written by: Roger Cantin
- Produced by: Chantal Lafleur; Rock Demers
- Starring: Charlie Arcouette-Martineau; George Brossard; Gaston Caron; Isabelle Cyr; Xavier Dolan
- Cinematography: Allen Smith
- Edited by: Simon Sauvé
- Music by: Milan Kymlicka
- Production company: Les Productions La Fête
- Distributed by: Equinoxe Films
- Release date: June 22, 2001
- Running time: 90 minutes
- Country: Canada
- Language: Quebec French

The Hidden Fortress (French: La Forteresse suspendue) is a Canadian children's comedy film, directed by Roger Cantin and released in 2001. Part of Rock Demers's Tales for All (Contes pour tous) series of children's films, the film centres on two groups of rival children playing war games while spending summer vacation with their families at cottages on a lake, which are complicated when the leader of the losing team resorts to detaining prisoners of war in a desperate attempt to win the game.

The cast includes Matthew Dupuis, Roxanne Gaudette-Loiseau, Jérôme Leclerc-Couture, Jean-Philippe Debien, Charli Arcouette-Martineau, Xavier Dolan, Laurent-Christophe De Ruelle, Jeremy Gagnon, Carmina Senosier, Émilie Cyrenne-Parent, Serge-Olivier Paquette, Hugo Dubé, Georges Brossard, Patrick Labbé, Isabelle Cyr, Gaston Caron, Fayolle Jean and Mireille Métellus.

Although not officially billed as a sequel to the earlier film, some of the children's parents were participants in the events of The Dog Who Stopped the War (La Guerre des tuques).

== Production ==
The film was shot in fall 2000, in and around Sainte-Sophie, Quebec.

== Critical response ==
Kathryn Greenaway of the Montreal Gazette wrote that "there is nothing so chilling as watching children resort to interpretations of disturbing adult behaviour. And so we watch Marc - lurking in shadow and camouflage face paint - take prisoners of war. He threatens them with torture and humiliation. His clanmates snicker. Things go from bad to worse when it is discovered that Indian chief Julian (Jerome Leclerc-Couture) and Marc's sister Sarah (Roxane Gaudette-Loiseau) have fallen for each other. This will not do. It is forbidden for the Montagues and the Capulets to mix. Oops. Wrong story."

For the Vancouver Sun, Marke Andrews wrote that "there are subplots about a legendary bogeyman called the Man of the Woods, a black bear on the loose and a potentially disastrous forest fire, and somehow these three elements bring about a resolution to the conflict, although it occurs in such haphazard fashion you're not quite sure how they all fit together. The strength of the film is in the way it captures childhood games from a child's perspective. Like The Dog Who Stopped the War, the conflict has an innocence that is refreshing in these times of 10-year-old armed gangbangers."

== Awards ==
Pierre Blain, Michel Descombes and Réjean Juteau received a Genie Award nomination for Best Overall Sound at the 22nd Genie Awards.
