= Strand: Under the Dark Cloth =

- Directed by: John Walker
- Produced by: John Walker
- Cinematography: John Walker
- Edited by: Geoff Bowie; Cathy Gulkin; John Kramer
- Music by: Jean Derome; René Lussier
- Production company: John Walker Productions
- Release date: 1989
- Running time: 81 minutes
- Country: Canada
- Language: English

Strand: Under the Dark Cloth is a Canadian documentary film directed by John Walker. A portrait of photographer and filmmaker Paul Strand, it premiered at the 1989 Festival of Festivals before being released theatrically in 1990.

The film won the Genie Award for Best Feature Length Documentary at the 11th Genie Awards.
