= Jason St. Amour =

Canadian actor

Jason St. Amour is a Canadian actor. He is best known for his performance in the film Train of Dreams, for which he received a Genie Award nomination for Best Actor at the 9th Genie Awards in 1988.

At the time of his casting in Train of Dreams, he was a 17-year-old resident of Montreal who had previously only been an extra. In addition to his Genie Award nomination, he won the awards for Best Actor at the Chicago International Film Festival in 1987, the Gijón International Film Festival in 1988, and the International Youth and Children's Film Festival in 1989.

Following Train of Dreams, St. Amour had supporting roles in the films Welcome Home and Lantern Hill.
