= The Revenge of the Woman in Black =

1997 Canadian crime comedy film

- French: La vengeance de la femme en noir
- Directed by: Roger Cantin
- Written by: Roger Cantin
- Produced by: Franco Battista
- Starring: Germain Houde; Raymond Bouchard; Marc Labrèche
- Cinematography: Alain Dostie
- Edited by: Richard Comeau
- Music by: Milan Kymlicka
- Production company: Allegro Films
- Release date: March 28, 1997
- Running time: 109 minutes
- Country: Canada
- Language: French

The Revenge of the Woman in Black (French: La vengeance de la femme en noir) is a Canadian crime comedy film, directed by Roger Cantin and released in 1997. A sequel to his 1991 film Four Stiffs and a Trombone (L'assassin jouait du trombone), the film revisits Augustin Marleau (Germain Houde), now a successful comedian who is framed for murder by his manager Édouard Elkin (Marc Labrèche).

The cast also includes Raymond Bouchard, Normand Lévesque, France Castel, Jean-Guy Bouchard and Micheline Lanctôt.

Francesca Chamberland received a Genie Award nomination for Best Costume Design at the 18th Genie Awards.
