= Occupy Love =

- Directed by: Velcrow Ripper
- Produced by: Nova Ami; Ian Mackenzie; Velcrow Ripper
- Release date: October 7, 2012 (Vancouver Film Festival)
- Language: English

Occupy Love is a 2012 documentary film about the Occupy movement directed by Velcrow Ripper. The film premiered at the 2012 Vancouver International Film Festival.

== Overview ==
Occupy Love argues that the Arab Spring, Occupy movement, Indignados and other movements all form part of a single global movement. The film's central question is: "How could the crisis we're facing become a love story?" Ripper comments: "This isn't a flaky ideal or some kind of a dream. This is a necessary, very practical step forward for humanity ... This is what's needed if we’re going to turn things—these huge crises facing the planet—around." The film features figures including bell hooks, Naomi Klein, Bill McKibben, Judy Rebick and Rebecca Solnit. It also includes testimonies from activists involved in the movements described.

== Production ==
The film's funding was crowdsourced. Shooting locations included Spain and Cairo, Egypt.

== Critical reception ==
Writing for canada.com, Ethan Cox described the film as "Visually stunning, politically incendiary, audaciously inspiring ... a masterpiece." Alan Scherstuhl of The Village Voice praised the film's "arresting" and "often inspiring" photography, but observed it may find an unexpected audience in "rightwingers eager to dismiss everything Occupy as hopelessly naive."
