= The Backstreet Six =

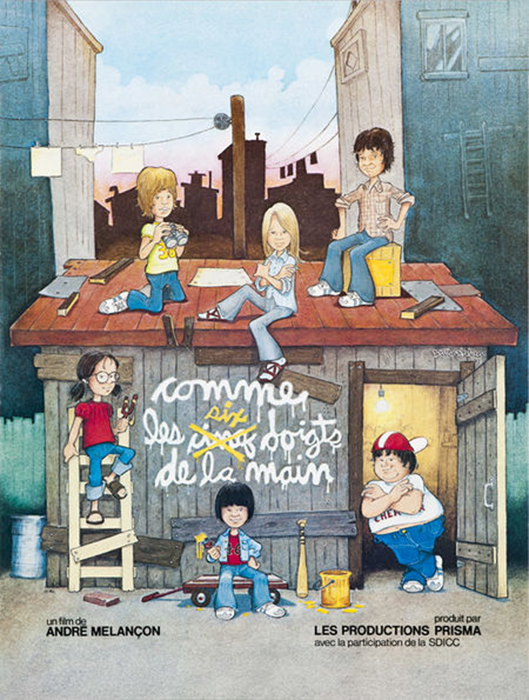
- French: Comme les six doigts de la main
- Directed by: André Melançon
- Written by: André Melançon
- Produced by: Marcia Couëlle; Claude Godbout
- Starring: Éric Beauséjour; Philippe Bouchard; Caroline Laroche; Daniel Murray; José Neves; Nancy Normandin; Sylvain Provencher
- Cinematography: Guy Dufaux
- Edited by: André Corriveau
- Music by: Pierick Houdy
- Production company: Les Productions Prisma
- Distributed by: France Film
- Release date: November 5, 1978
- Running time: 74 minutes
- Country: Canada
- Language: French

The Backstreet Six (French: Comme les six doigts de la main, lit. "Like the Six Fingers of a Hand") is a Canadian children's comedy film, directed by André Melançon and released in 1978. The film centres on a group of five young children who are submitting a newcomer to their neighbourhood to an initiation test to determine whether he will be welcome to join their group of friends, while the group are simultaneously on the trail of an older man whom they believe to be a spy.

The film's cast includes Éric Beauséjour, Philippe Bouchard, Caroline Laroche, Daniel Murray, José Neves, Nancy Normandin and Sylvain Provencher.

The film won the Prix L.-E.-Ouimet-Molson from the Association québécoise des critiques de cinéma in 1978.
