= Bones of the Forest =

Bones of the Forest is a Canadian documentary film, directed by Heather Frise and Velcrow Ripper and released in 1995. An exploration of the forestry industry, the film depicts a variety of views on the conflict between logging and environmentalism, including those of loggers, alternative forestry practitioners, a vice-president of MacMillan Bloedel, First Nations elders and environmental activists.

The film won the Genie Award for Best Feature Length Documentary at the 17th Genie Awards in 1996, and the award for Best Feature Documentary at the 1996 Hot Docs Canadian International Documentary Festival.
