= To Hurt and to Heal =

- Directed by: Laura Sky
- Produced by: Laura Sky
- Cinematography: James Aquila
- Edited by: Cathy Gulkin
- Music by: Patrick Godfrey; Gail Bradshaw
- Production company: SkyWorks
- Release date: 1986
- Running time: 105 minutes
- Country: Canada
- Language: English

To Hurt and to Heal is a Canadian documentary film, directed by Laura Sky and released in 1986. The film presents a portrait of neonatal medical care, centred on the stories of three children: a child who was born premature and survived for six weeks before his death; a "miracle baby" who was saved by emergency heart surgery; and a child who was left disabled by an emergency tracheotomy that left him permanently unable to ever breathe on his own without a mechanical respirator.

The film first received a two-part screening at Toronto's CentreStage Forum in November 1986, before being screened as a full feature documentary film at the 1987 Mayworks Festival and the 1987 Festival of Festivals.

The film received a Genie Award nomination for Best Feature Length Documentary at the 9th Genie Awards in 1988.
