= Bach and Broccoli =

1986 film directed by André Melançon

- French: Bach et Bottine
- Directed by: André Melançon
- Written by: André Melançon; Bernadette Renaud
- Produced by: Rock Demers
- Starring: Mahée Paiement; Raymond Legault; Denis Bernard; Andrée Pelletier
- Cinematography: Guy Dufaux
- Edited by: André Corriveau
- Music by: Pierick Houdy
- Production company: Les Productions La Fête Inc.
- Distributed by: Cinéma Plus
- Release date: 1986
- Running time: 96 minutes
- Country: Canada
- Language: French

Bach and Broccoli (French: Bach et Bottine) is a 1986 Canadian children's comedy film directed by André Melançon. It is the third film in the Tales for All series of children's and family films.

The film stars Mahée Paiement as Fanny, a young orphan girl living with her uncle (Raymond Legault), who is named Jean-Claude in the French version and Jonathan in the English. Her uncle, an accountant and amateur classical musician, pays little attention to her as he is obsessed with practicing the music of Johann Sebastian Bach on his organ for an upcoming music competition; Fanny, meanwhile, takes advantage of his negligence to collect a menagerie of animals beginning with her pet skunk Broccoli/Bottine. The situation eventually draws the attention of the local child services, who threaten to remove Fanny from the home to place her with a new foster family.

At the 8th Genie Awards in 1987, Andrée Pelletier garnered a Genie Award nomination for Best Supporting Actress for her performance as Bérénice.

Miss Boots (Mlle Bottine), a remake of the film directed by Yan Lanouette Turgeon and written by Dominic James, was released in 2024.

== Cast ==
- Mahée Paiement
- Raymond Legault
- Denis Bernard
- Andrée Pelletier
