= Famille et variations =

1977 Canadian documentary film by Mireille Dansereau

- Directed by: Mireille Dansereau
- Produced by: Anne Claire Poirier
- Narrated by: Ginette Paris
- Cinematography: Michel Thomas-d'Hoste; Roger Rochat
- Edited by: Jacques Drouin
- Music by: Robert Léger; Marie-Michèle Desrosiers; Marthe Blackburn; Pierre Huet
- Production company: National Film Board of Canada
- Release date: March 30, 1977
- Running time: 75 minutes
- Country: Canada
- Language: French

Famille et variations is a Canadian documentary film, directed by Mireille Dansereau and released in 1977. The film is a portrait of the changing social and political context of the nuclear family in the 1970s, focusing on four families of varying circumstances: a traditional nuclear family with a special needs child, a separated family, a single-parent family and a family in a communal living environment.

The film received a Canadian Film Award nomination for Best Feature Length Documentary at the 28th Canadian Film Awards in 1977.
