= Elephant Dreams =

- Directed by: Martha Davis
- Produced by: Martha Davis
- Cinematography: Martha Davis
- Edited by: Martha Davis
- Production company: Liaison of Independent Filmmakers of Toronto
- Release date: 1987
- Running time: 17 minutes
- Country: Canada
- Language: English

Elephant Dreams is a Canadian documentary film, directed by Martha Davis and released in 1987. The film is an exploration of the role of elephants in human art and mythology.

The film premiered in the short films program at the 1987 Festival of Festivals.

The film received a Genie Award nomination for Best Feature Length Documentary at the 9th Genie Awards in 1988.
