= The Fairy Faith =

2000 Canadian documentary film

- Directed by: John Walker
- Written by: John Walker
- Produced by: John Walker; Kent Martin
- Narrated by: John Walker
- Cinematography: Nigel Markham; John Walker
- Edited by: Angela Baker
- Music by: Scott MacMillan; Mac Crimmon’s Revenge; Mary Jane Lamond
- Production company: John Walker Productions
- Distributed by: National Film Board of Canada
- Release date: February 10, 2000
- Running time: 75 minutes
- Country: Canada
- Language: English

The Fairy Faith is a Canadian documentary film, directed by John Walker and released in 2000. The film is an exploration of the history of fairy imagery and folklore.

A shorter television edition of the film premiered on February 10, 2000, as an episode of the CBC Television documentary series Witness, prior to a full 75-minute version premiering at the 2001 Hot Docs Canadian International Documentary Festival.

The film received a Genie Award nomination for Best Feature Length Documentary at the 21st Genie Awards in 2001.
