= Mahée Paiement =

Quebec movie and television actress

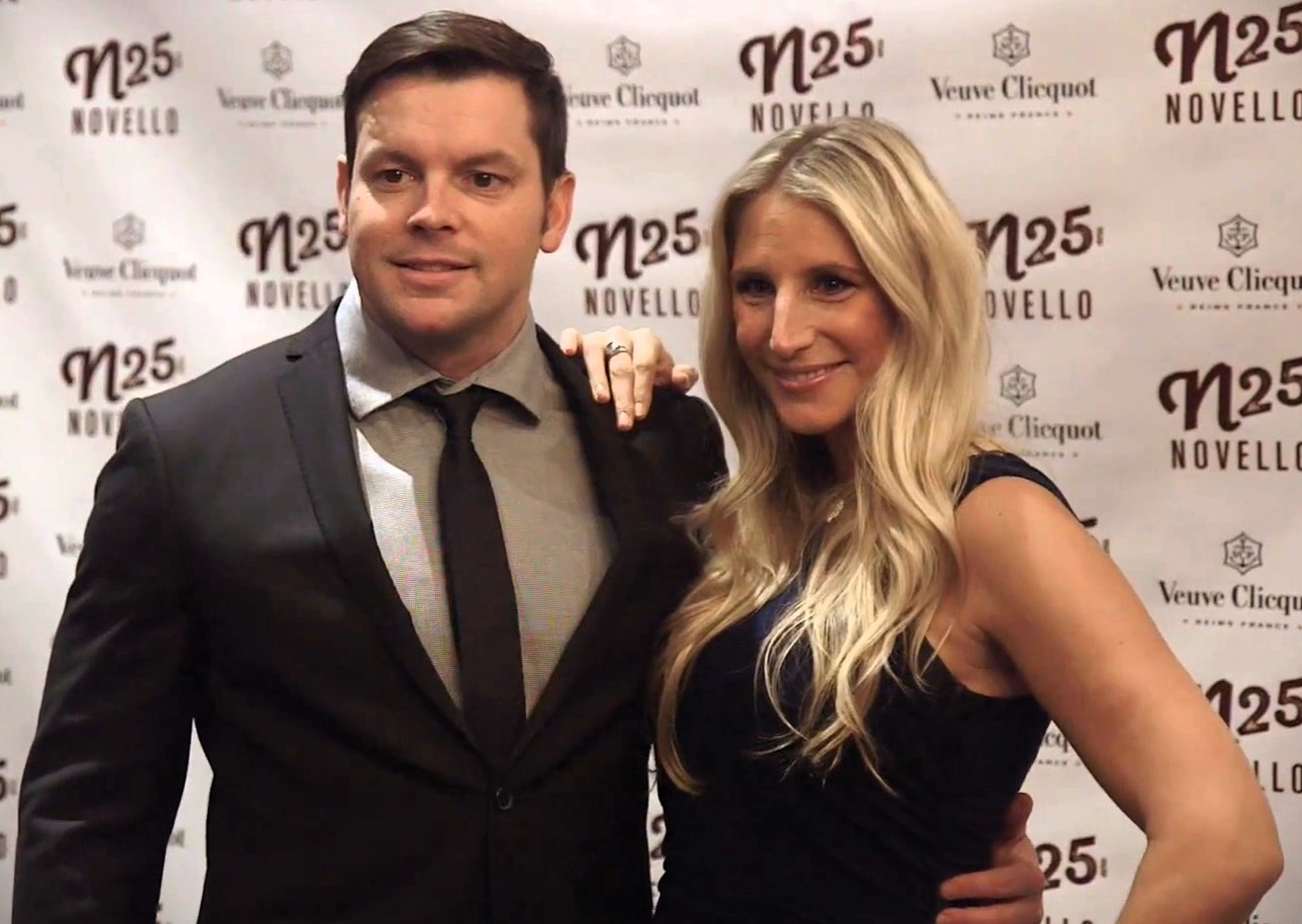
Paiement (R) with husband Jean-François Comeau, in 2016

Mahée Paiement (born January 2, 1976, in Saint-Eustache, Quebec) is a Quebec movie and television actress and known for playing several roles in popular Quebec movies and films since 1986.

== Background ==
After a television role in 1982, Paiement started to perform movie roles in 1986 at the age of 10 when she appeared in Bach et Bottine. During the next 20 years, she appeared in several movies such as Les Boys IV, Les 3 ptit's cochons and popular television series such as Watatatow, Diva, Un gars, une fille, Caméra café, Les Boys (TV series) and Miss Météo (TV series). She also performed theatrical acts from 1992 to 1996 and is also modelling in Sweden.

== Filmography ==
=== Cinema ===
- Bach and Broccoli (Bach et Bottine) - 1986
- Death of a Silence - 1987
- A Walk on the Moon - 1999
- Les Boys IV - 2005
- The 3 L'il Pigs (Les 3 p'tits cochons) - 2007
- My Aunt Aline (Ma tante Aline) - 2007
- Brain Freeze - 2021

=== Television ===
- Peau de banane (1982)
- Rachel et Rejean (1987)
- L'amour avec un grand A (1988)
- La Saga d'Archibald (1990)
- Watatatow (1990-???)
- Diva (1997)
- Un gars, une fille (1997)
- Caméra café (2002)
- Miss Metéo (2005)
- Les Boys (television series) (2007–2008)
- Miss Météo (television series) (2008)
