= Jake and the Kid (1961 TV series) =

Canadian television series

- Genre: Drama
- Written by: W. O. Mitchell
- Country of origin: Canada
- Original language: English
- No. of seasons: 1
- No. of episodes: 13

Production
- Executive producer: Raymond Whitehouse
- Producers: Ron Weyman; David Gardner
- Running time: 30 minutes

Original release
- Network: CBC Television
- Release: 4 July – 19 September 1961

Jake and the Kid is a Canadian drama television series that aired on CBC Television in 1961.

== Premise ==
Adaptations of W. O. Mitchell's Jake and the Kid stories were broadcast on CBC Radio between 1949 and 1954. CBC Television produced this 13-part series featuring Jake Trumper (Murray Westgate), the Kid (Rex Hagon) and Ma (Frances Tobias), MacTaggart (Robert Christie), Repeat Golightly (Eric House) and Sam Gatenby (Alex McKee) in the community of Crocus, Saskatchewan.

A new version of the series, Jake and the Kid, aired in the 1990s.

== Scheduling ==
This half-hour series was broadcast on Tuesdays at 8:30 p.m. (Eastern) from 4 July to 19 September 1961.

An unsuccessful attempt by the National Film Board of Canada to produce a full season of Jake and the Kid series for the CBC resulted in only one production, "Political Dynamite" which was broadcast as a CBC Television special on 23 June 1963. Here, John Drainie portrayed Jake as he did for the CBC Radio series, while Tony Haig was cast as the Kid.
