= Pierick Houdy =

French composer and musician (1929–2021)

- Born: 18 January 1929; Rennes, France
- Died: 22 March 2021 (aged 92) Le Palais, France
- Occupation(s): Composer; Musician
- Instruments: Piano, organ

Pierick Houdy (18 January 1929 – 22 March 2021) was a French composer, organist, pianist, kapellmeister, and professor.

== Biography ==
Houdy began his musical studies in 1935 at the Conservatoire de Rennes. His first compositions date from that year. In 1937, he first played publicly at the Opéra de Rennes and his first four works were published by Henry Lemoine under the title À mes petits amis. He practiced piano with Marguerite Long and was admitted to the Conservatoire de Paris in 1939, where he studied under Noël Gallon, Nadia Boulanger, Simone Plé-Caussade, Maurice Duruflé, Olivier Messiaen, Darius Milhaud, and others. Outside the Conservatory, he studied piano with Lazare Lévy. He received the Deuxième Prix of the Prix de Rome in 1953 and won first prize in composition from the Conservatoire de Paris in 1954, as well at the Grand Prix de la Ville de Paris that same year.

Houdy was the Director of the Conservatoire de Tours from 1955 to 1960, professor at Schola cantorum in 1963 and 1964, Kapellmeister of the Church of Saint-Séverin from 1965 to 1969, and conductor of the Maîtrise d'enfants de Radio France from 1966 to 1969. He was then a professor of composition at the Université Laval and the Conservatoire de musique et d'art dramatique du Québec. He returned to France in 1992 and began teaching musical writing in Brest and Quimper.

Pierick Houdy died in Le Palais on 22 March 2021 at the age of 92.

== Filmography (selection) ==
- 1964: License to Kill (Nick Carter va tout casser)
- 1965: Ces dames s'en mêlent
- 1978: The Backstreet Six (Comme les six doigts de la main)
- 1986: Bach and Broccoli (Bach et Bottine)
- 1990: Vincent and Me
