= Die (film) =

- Directed by: Dominic James
- Written by: Domenico Salvaggio
- Story by: Nick Mead
- Produced by: Pierfrancesco Fiorenza
- Starring: Elias Koteas; Emily Hampshire
- Cinematography: Nicolas Bolduc; Giulio Pietromarchi
- Edited by: Sacha Sojic
- Release date: June 2010 (SIFF)
- Countries: Canada; Italy
- Language: English

Die is a 2010 Canadian-Italian thriller film written by Domenico Salvaggio and directed by Dominic James and starring Elias Koteas and Emily Hampshire.

== Plot ==
Six strangers wake up in cells in an underground facility. Their captive decides their fate with the roll of a die.

== Cast ==
- Elias Koteas as Mark Murdock
- Emily Hampshire as Lisa Meridian
- John Pyper-Ferguson as Jacob Odessa
- Caterina Murino as Sofia Valenti
- Patricia McKenzie as Diane Robinson
- Karl Pruner as Zach Emmett
- Katie Boland as Melody Chambers
- Fabio Fulco as Robert Moretti
- Simone-Élise Girard as Claire
- Bill Croft as Deakins
- Chip Chuipka as William
- Peter Miller as Tom
- Frank Schorpion as Chef Wesley
