= The Young Magician (film) =

- French: Le jeune magicien
- Polish: Cudowne dziecko
- Directed by: Waldemar Dziki
- Written by: Waldemar Dziki
- Produced by: Rock Demers; Krzysztof Zanussi
- Starring: Rusty Jedwab; Daria Trafankowska; Mariusz Benoit
- Cinematography: Wit Dabal
- Edited by: André Corriveau
- Music by: Krzesimir Dębski
- Production companies: Les Productions La Fête Inc; Zespol Filmowy "Tor"
- Release date: 1987
- Running time: 106 minutes
- Countries: Canada, Poland
- Language: Polish

The Young Magician (French: Le jeune magicien; Polish: Cudowne dziecko) is a Canadian-Polish children's drama film, directed by Waldemar Dziki and released in 1987. The fourth film in the Tales for All series of children's films, the film centres on Peter Meller (Rusty Jedwab), a young boy who is initially treated as an outcast when he discovers that he possesses the ability to telekinetically move objects with his mind, but becomes a hero when his power is the only thing that can save his city from a military accident.

Although the film was shot in Poland with a Polish cast of actors, and then dubbed into English and French for Canadian distribution, its setting was portrayed as Canada. Nicholas Read of the Vancouver Sun criticized this as a narrative contrivance, noting that the dialogue and costume design did not feel natural to a contemporary Canadian setting.

The film received three Genie Award nominations at the 9th Genie Awards in 1988, for Best Overall Sound (Michel Charron, Jo Caron, André Gagnon, Michel Descombes), Best Sound Editing (Viateur Paiement, Serge Viau, Alain Clavier, Claude Langlois, Louise Coté) and Best Original Song (Howard Forman and Krzesimir Dębski for "When We're Together").

== Cast ==
- Rusty Jedwab as Piotr Meller
- Eduard Garson as Aleksander
- Daria Trafankowska
- Mariusz Benoit
- Władysław Kowalski
- Natasza Maraszek as Małgosia
- Tomasz Klimasiewicz as Michał
- Jan Machulski
- Maria Robaszkiewicz
- Maciej Szary
- Danuta Kowalska
- Grażyna Szapołowska
- Andrzej Szczepkowski
- Andrzej Blumenfeld
- Wojciech Asiński
- Ewa Biała
- Zbigniew Bielski
- Jan Hencz
- Piotr Krukowski
- Wojciech Mann
- Bogusława Pawelec
- Piotr Polk
- Zbigniew Suszyński
- Michał Szewczyk
- Zdzisław Szostak
