= John Walker (filmmaker) =

Canadian filmmaker and cinematographer (born 1952)

John Charles Walker (born July 5, 1952 in Montreal, Quebec) is a Canadian filmmaker and cinematographer.

His film Strand: Under the Dark Cloth won the Genie Award for Best Feature-Length Documentary at the 11th Genie Awards in 1990, and he won Gemini Awards in 1992 for Leningradskaya: The Hand of Stalin and 1996 for Utshimassits: Place of the Boss.

He was also a Genie Award nominee for Best Director at the 10th Genie Awards in 1989 for A Winter Tan, a collective film that he codirected and coproduced with Louise Clark, Jackie Burroughs, Aerlyn Weissman and John Frizzell, and his film The Fairy Faith was a nominee for Best Feature-Length Documentary at the 21st Genie Awards in 2001.

His other films have included Chambers: Tracks and Gestures, Distress Signals, Calling the Shots, Utshimassits: Place of the Boss, God's Dominion: Shepherds to the Flock, Men of the Deeps, Passage, Quebec My Country Mon Pays and Assholes: A Theory. In 2011 he was a participant in the National Parks Project, collaborating with musicians Chad Ross, Sophie Trudeau and Dale Morningstar on a short film about Prince Edward Island National Park.

He was a founding member of the Documentary Organization of Canada.
