= The Canneries =

- Directed by: Stephen Insley; Bonni Devlin
- Produced by: Stephen Insley; Bonni Devlin
- Cinematography: Bonni Devlin
- Release date: 1987
- Country: Canada
- Language: English

The Canneries is a Canadian documentary film, directed by Stephen Insley and Bonni Devlin and released in 1987. The film presents a history of salmon canneries in British Columbia.

The film received a Genie Award nomination for Best Feature Length Documentary at the 9th Genie Awards in 1988.
