= Dreams Beyond Memory =

- Directed by: Andrzej Markiewicz
- Written by: Andrzej Markiewicz
- Produced by: Don Haig; Anthony Kramreither
- Starring: George Touliatos; Lisa Schrage; Maruska Stankova
- Cinematography: Karol Ike
- Edited by: Michael Manne
- Production companies: Brightstar Films; Film Arts; Miramax; Telefilm Canada
- Release date: December 4, 1987
- Running time: 93 min.
- Country: Canada
- Language: English

Dreams Beyond Memory is a Canadian drama film, directed by Andrzej Markiewicz and released in 1987. The film stars George Touliatos as George, an older man whose relationship with his companion Olga (Maruska Stankova) is complicated when he meets Jennifer (Lisa Schrage), a young woman who reminds him of his late wife.

Film critic Jay Scott panned the film, calling it a "technically deficient film" which played "soggy games about loss, illusion and memory that are as predictable as they are soporific". He opined that Piotr Lysak, who had a small non-speaking role in the film as George's younger self in flashbacks, was the actor who had the most to be thankful for in the entire film.

Stankova received a Genie Award nomination for Best Supporting Actress at the 9th Genie Awards.
