= Fashion 99 =

- Directed by: Karen Firus
- Written by: Karen Firus
- Starring: Sharron Kearney
- Music by: Timothy McGuinness
- Release date: 1986
- Running time: 16 minutes
- Country: Canada
- Language: English

Fashion 99 is a Canadian short film, directed by Karen Firus and released in 1986. Set in a futuristic world where the fashion industry controls society, the film stars Sharron Kearney as Orchid, a fashion photographer who has a nightmare that her clothes attack her in a bid for revenge.

The film, made while Firus was a film student at the University of British Columbia, premiered at the 1986 Montreal World Film Festival, where it won the Norman McLaren Award for Best Student Film. It was later screened at the Festival of Canadian Fashion in June 1987, winning the festival's special jury award for excellence in fashion video. It received a Genie Award nomination for Best Theatrical Short Film at the 9th Genie Awards in 1988.
