= Jay Cheel =

Canadian filmmaker

Jay Cheel (born c. 1979) is a Canadian documentary filmmaker, editor and podcaster.

== Career ==
He is mainly known for directing the feature-length documentary Beauty Day, and short film Cooking With Gerry – Episode #2: Poutine that premiered at the Flyway Film Festival. Since 2005, he has been co-hosting the Film Junk Podcast, which holds the Guinness World records record for longest-running movie podcast.

In addition to these works, Jay has also made several others, including a viral marketing mockumentary, entitled The Goblin Man of Norway. The film follow several fictitious professionals' opinions on a recent discovery of a humanoid robot, found buried in the glaciers of the arctic.

Cheel has shown a keen interest in time travel, as evidenced by his first documentary Obsessed and Scientific, as well as his documentary How to Build a Time Machine. Both aim to discuss the possibility of time traveling, and introduce fact while blending together elements and examples of fictitious time travel.

In July 2024, he was confirmed to write and direct a segment for V/H/S/Beyond, which was released exclusively on Shudder on October 4, 2024.

== Cursed Films ==
Cheel wrote, directed, and edited both seasons of the Shudder documentary series Cursed Films which explores "cursed" (troubled) productions on classic films such as The Wizard of Oz, The Exorcist and The Omen.
