= Rex Hagon =

Canadian actor

Rex Hagon is a Canadian actor and television host.

== Education ==
Hagon attended Upper Canada College. He is a graduate of sociology from the University of Toronto.

== Life ==
His performing career began in his youth, most notably with the children's television program The Forest Rangers.

He presently operates a consulting business which specializes in corporate communication.

== Filmography ==
- 1954-1958: On Camera (TV series, CBC)
- 1956-1958: First Performance (TV series, CBC)
- 1961: Jake and the Kid (TV series, CBC)
- 1963-1965: The Forest Rangers (TV series, CBC)
- 1969: Adventures in Rainbow Country
- 1970-1974: Drop-In (TV series, CBC)
- 1970s (specific years unknown): Polka Dot Door (TVOntario)
- 1971: The Reincarnate
- 1970s (specific years unknown): Tell Me a Story (TVOntario)
- 1980: Matt and Jenny
- 1979-1985: The Littlest Hobo (TV series, CTV)
- 1981-1982: The Science Alliance (TV series, TVOntario)
- 1985-1989: Alfred Hitchcock Presents (TV series, NBC)
- 1987-1994: Street Legal (TV series, CBC)
- 1988-1989: Police Academy (animated series) (TV series, Warner Bros. Television)
- 1988-1989: RoboCop: The Animated Series (TV series, syndicated)
- 1989-1991: Babar (TV series, HBO)
- 1990: Piggsburg Pigs! (TV series, Fox Kids)
- 1993-1995: The Busy World of Richard Scarry (TV series, Showtime/Nick Jr. Channel)

== See also ==
- Garrick Hagon, brother
