= Blue City Slammers =

- Directed by: Peter Shatalow
- Written by: Peter Shatalow; Layne Coleman
- Based on: Blue City Slammers by Layne Coleman
- Produced by: Peter Shatalow; Bruce Raymond
- Starring: Tracy Cunningham; Eric Keenleyside; Fran Gebhard; Gary Farmer
- Cinematography: Robert C. New
- Edited by: Leslie Borden Brown
- Music by: Tim McCauley
- Production company: Shatalow/Raymond Productions
- Distributed by: Cineplex Odeon
- Release date: April 29, 1988
- Country: Canada
- Language: English

Blue City Slammers is a 1987 Canadian drama film directed by Peter Shatalow. Based on the theatrical play by Layne Coleman, the film centres on the personal and sport lives of the players on a women's softball team in the small town of Blue City. The cast includes Tracy Cunningham, Eric Keenleyside, Fran Gebhard, Gary Farmer, Murray Westgate and Gabriel Hogan.

The film garnered three Genie Award nominations at the 9th Genie Awards in 1988: Best Supporting Actor (Westgate), Best Supporting Actress (Gebhard) and Best Original Score (Tim McCauley).
