= Scared Sacred =

- Directed by: Velcrow Ripper
- Production company: National Film Board of Canada
- Release date: September 14, 2004
- Country: Canada

Scared Sacred is an independent film produced in 2004 and released in 2006 by director Velcrow Ripper.

Scared Sacred is a feature-length documentary that takes viewers to many of the places in the world that have experienced great suffering in recent years including Bhopal, Hiroshima, Israel and Palestine. The film portrays Ripper's own search for meaning, and communicates stories of hope in spite of oppression.

Co-produced by the National Film Board of Canada and Producers on Davie Pictures, Scared Sacred received a Genie Award for Best Documentary.

A second film by Velcrow Ripper, Fierce Light builds on where Scared Sacred ends. Fierce Light is about spiritual activists.
