= The Great Land of Small =

- French language poster
- French: C'est pas parce qu'on est petit qu'on peut pas être grand!
- Directed by: Vojtěch Jasný
- Written by: David Sigmund
- Produced by: Rock Demers
- Starring: Michael J. Anderson; Michael Blouin; Ken Roberts; Rodrigue Tremblay
- Cinematography: Michel Brault
- Edited by: Hélène Girard
- Music by: Normand Dubé; Guy Trépanier
- Production company: Telefilm Canada
- Distributed by: New World Pictures
- Release date: 1986
- Running time: 93 minutes
- Country: Canada
- Languages: English; French

The Great Land of Small (French: C'est pas parce qu'on est petit qu'on peut pas être grand!) is a 1986 Canadian fantasy children's film. It was written by David Sigmund and directed by Vojtěch Jasný. The film starred Michael J. Anderson in one of his first roles. The film is the fifth in the Tales for All (Contes Pour Tous) series of children's movies created by Les Productions la Fête.

== Plot ==
Two children, Jenny and David, meet a leprechaun-like creature called Fritz in the woods; however, his gold dust is being stolen by a wicked hunter. Only Mimmick the Indian knows that the creature is in our world. As the hunter becomes mad with power, he attempts to capture Fritz and the children. With Mimmick's help, they escape to the Land of Small, a mystical, magical land.

== Cast ==
- Michael J. Anderson as Fritz and the King
- Karen Elkin as Jenny
- Michael Blouin as David
- Ken Roberts as Flannigan and Munch
- Rodrigue Tremblay as Mimmick

== Reception ==
The reviewer at the Canuxploitation website, which is devoted to Canadian B-movies, thought that The Great Land of Small was "a real oddity", labelling it "a half-baked fantasy". Although praising the inclusion of Cirque du Soleil, he thought of The Great Land of Small as one of Demers' least successful films. They thought that the film could be rated "W" for "What the Hell?", thereby reflecting the idea that it was "[w]eird" but "not trippy enough to be interesting". Arguing that the beginning of the film was "tediously padded", they thought that the subplot based around Mimmick and Flannigan was unnecessary, and that the actual Great Land of Small – while envisioned as a place like the Land of Oz or The Neverending Story's Fantasia – was "a distinct disappointment" due to its "embarrassingly low-budget production design, and cheap editing tricks".
