= Roger Cantin =

Canadian screenwriter and film director

Roger Cantin (born December 29, 1949) is a Canadian screenwriter and film director from Quebec, best known as a director of children's films. He began his career as co-writer with his wife Danyèle Patenaude of the screenplay for the 1984 film The Dog Who Stopped the War (La Guerre des tuques), before making his directorial debut with Simon and the Dream Hunters (Simon les nuages) in 1990.

Although best known for his children's films, he has also directed both adult drama and documentary films, as well as television.

He received a Genie Award nomination for Best Original Screenplay at the 15th Genie Awards in 1994 for Matusalem.

== Filmography ==
- The Dog Who Stopped the War (La Guerre des tuques) – 1984
- Simon and the Dream Hunters (Simon les nuages) – 1990
- Four Stiffs and a Trombone (L'assassin jouait du trombone) – 1991
- Le Grand Zèle – 1992
- Matusalem – 1993
- The Revenge of the Woman in Black (La Vengeance de la femme en noir) – 1997
- Matusalem II (Matusalem II, le dernier des Beauchesne) – 1997
- The Hidden Fortress (La Forteresse suspendue) – 2001
- A Cargo to Africa (Un cargo pour l'Afrique) — 2009
