= Michał Szewczyk (actor) =

Polish actor (1934–2021)

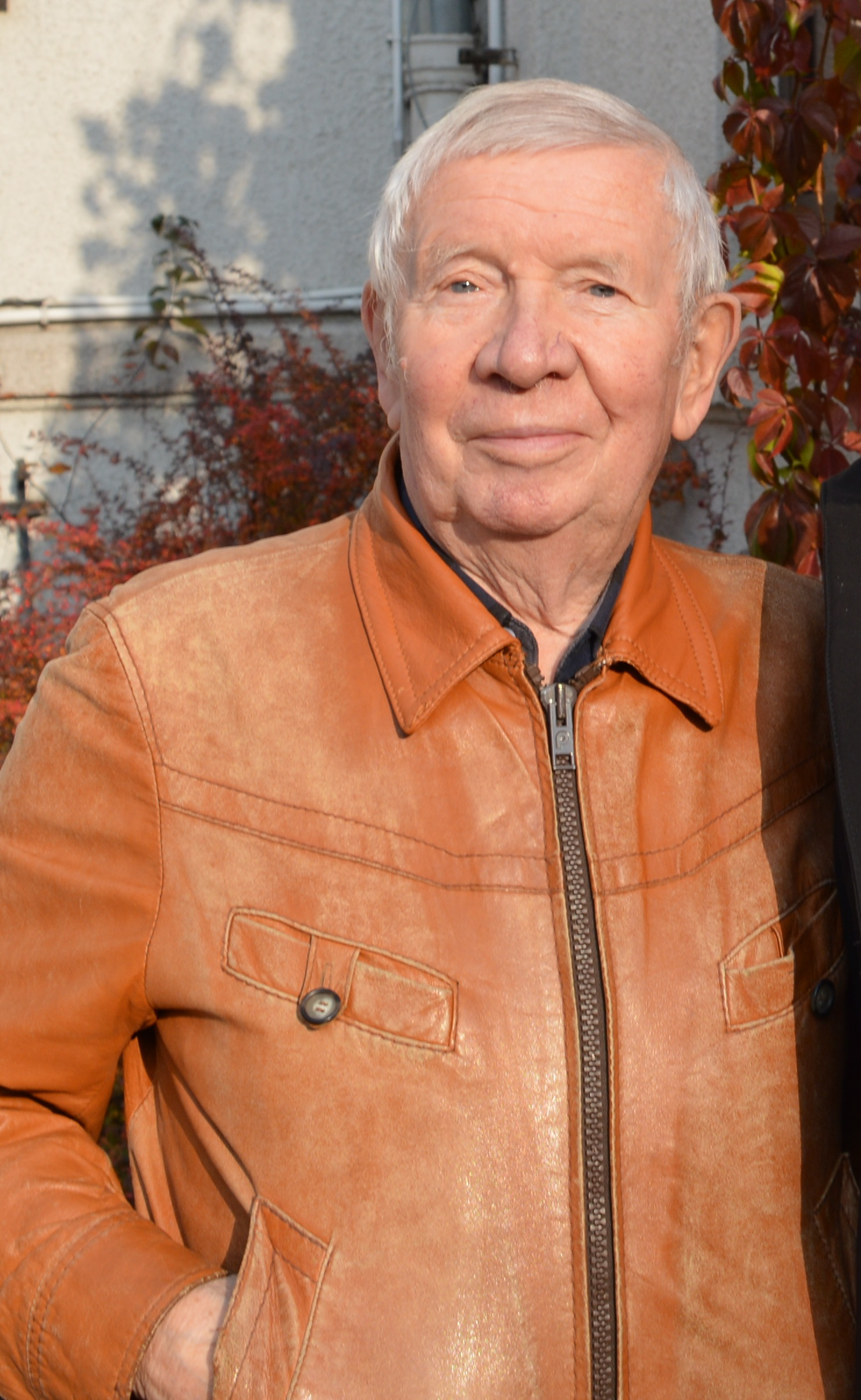
- Born: 29 July 1934; Łódź, Second Polish Republic
- Died: 8 February 2021 (aged 86)
- Occupation: Actor

Michał Szewczyk (29 July 1934 – 8 February 2021) was a Polish actor. He acted at the Teatr Powszechny w Łodzi and the Teatr Telewizji while also acting on film.

== Filmography ==
- Niedaleko Warszawy (1954)
- Ziemia (1956)
- Zemsta (1956)
- Koniec nocy (1956)
- Skarb kapitana Martensa (1957)
- Król Maciuś I (1957)
- Eroica (1958)
- Zamach (1958)
- Pan Anatol szuka miliona (1958)
- Kalosze szczęścia (1958)
- Zadzwońcie do mojej żony (1958)
- Tysiąc talarów (1959)
- Sygnały (1959)
- Rzeczywistość (1960)
- Historia żółtej ciżemki (1961)
- Tonight a City Will Die (1961)
- Zerwany most (1962)
- The Two Who Stole the Moon (1962)
- Jadą goście jadą... (1962)
- Głos z tamtego świata (1962)
- The Impossible Goodbye (1962)
- Weekendy (1963)
- Yokmok (1963)
- The Law and the Fist (1964)
- Pięciu (1964)
- Panienka z okienka (1964)
- Barwy walki (1964)
- Niedziela sprawiedliwości (1965)
- Kapitan Sowa na tropie (1965)
- Dzień ostatni, dzień pierwszy (1965)
- Z przygodą na ty (1966)
- Piekło i niebo (1966)
- Westerplatte (1967)
- Stawka większa niż życie (1967)
- Pieczona gęś (1967)
- Komedia z pomyłek (1967)
- Człowiek, który zdemoralizował Hadleyburg (1967)
- Kierunek Berlin (1968)
- Ostatnie dni (1969)
- Księżyc (1969)
- Pierścień księżnej Anny (1970)
- Doktor Ewa (1970)
- Akcja Brutus (1971)
- Zabijcie czarną owcę (1971)
- Samochodzik i templariusze (1971)
- Jeszcze słychać śpiew i rżenie koni... (1971)
- Palec Boży (1971)
- Zwycięstwo (1974)
- Polonia Restituta (1981)
- Przyjaciele (1981)
- Short Working Day (1981)
- Przygrywka (1982)
- The Mother of Kings (1982)
- Dzień kolibra (1983)
- Romans z intruzem (1984)
- Kobieta z prowincji (1984)
- Dłużnicy śmierci (1985)
- The Young Magician (1986)
- Trójkąt bermudzki (1987)
- Pantarej (1987)
- Mr Tański (1987)
- Powrót do Polski (1988)
- Desperacja (1988)
- Siwa legenda (1991)
- Klan (1997)
- Syzyfowe prace (1998)
- Syzyfowe prace (2000)
- Dom (2000)
- Małopole czyli świat (2000)
- Sprawa na dziś (2003–2005)
- Na Wspólnej (2003)
- Apetyt na miłość (2006)
- Święty Rafał Kalinowski (2007)
- Popiełuszko. Wolność jest w nas (2009)
- Weekend (2010)
- Księstwo (2011)
- Koleżanki (2011)
- Mit o „Szarym” (2012)
- Komisarz Alex (2012–2013)
- Medics (2013)
- Secret Wars (Służby specjalne) (2014)
- Sąsiady (2014)
- Na dobre i na złe (2016)

== Dubbing ==
- The Wonderful World of Puss 'n Boots (1969)
- Szczęśliwe dni Muminków (1983)
- Zima w dolinie Muminków (1986)
- Niezwykłe przygody pluszowych misiów (1990)
- Za siedmioma duchami (1997–2000)

== Awards ==
- Medal of the 40th Anniversary of People's Poland (1985)
- Gold Cross of Merit (1985)
- Meritorious Activist of Culture Badge (1985)
- Silver Medal for Merit to Culture – Gloria Artis (2015)
- Gold Medal for Merit to Culture – Gloria Artis (2020)
