= Beauty Day =

- Directed by: Jay Cheel
- Written by: Jay Cheel
- Produced by: Kristina McLaughlin; Kevin McMahon; Roman Pizzacalla
- Starring: Ralph Zavadil
- Production company: Primitive Entertainment
- Distributed by: Films We Like
- Release date: 10 June 2011
- Running time: 92 minutes
- Country: Canada
- Language: English

Beauty Day is a 2011 Canadian documentary film written and directed by Jay Cheel. It features the life and work of Ralph Zavadil whose Cap'n Video series on a community cable channel consisted of outlandish stunts which resembled those seen in the later Jackass series. Zavadil also discusses aspects of his personal life, such as working at the local GM plant, and his family which were affected by his drinking problem.

== Scenes ==
Zavadil began his Cap'n Video series on St. Catharines, Ontario cable channel 10 in 1990. One such incident involved an attempt at an "instant razor" where Zavadil applied combustible liquid on his face then set it on fire.

The film begins with a clip of Zavadil's most notorious stunt in which he attempted to dive into a covered swimming pool from a ladder. The ladder was unstable and his jump resulted in a head-first landing on the concrete deck. Zavadil then fell onto the pool's cover and nearly drowned as it sank until a neighbor came by and saved him. Zavadil fractured his neck as a result requiring a six-month recovery. The news of the failed stunt received attention from various international television shows.

Cap'n Video was cancelled in 1995 following a controversial Easter-themed episode in which Zavadil licked off chocolate sauce that was applied to a dog. The episode also featured a rabbit hung from a bungee cord. These scenes prompted criticism from viewers and the local Humane Society.

The documentary includes interview footage with Zavadil and excerpts from his Cap'n Video series. Other interview subjects include his mother (Barbara Zavadil) and his former girlfriend (Nancy Dewar).

The film's title is based on Zavadil's recurring use of the phrase, "It's going to be a beauty day".

== Reception ==
Beauty Day received average reviews from Postmedia, The Globe and Mail, the Toronto Star and Sun Media/QMI.
