= God Rides a Harley =

- Directed by: Stavros C. Stavrides
- Written by: Michael Wainwright; Spencer Frazer
- Produced by: Stavros C. Stavrides; Andreas Erne
- Production company: ARTO-pelli Motion Pictures Inc.
- Release date: 1987
- Running time: 81 minutes
- Country: Canada
- Language: English

God Rides a Harley is a Canadian documentary film, directed by Stavros C. Stavrides and released in 1987. The film profiles the Christian Riders motorcycle club, a group of bikers in Toronto who converted to Christianity.

The film won the Genie Award for Best Feature Length Documentary at the 9th Genie Awards.
