= Night Friend =

- Directed by: Peter Gerretsen
- Written by: Peter Gerretsen
- Produced by: Patricia Gerretsen; Don Haig
- Starring: Chuck Shamata; Heather Kjollesdal; Daniel MacIvor; Jayne Eastwood; Art Carney
- Cinematography: Douglas Koch
- Edited by: Michael Todd
- Music by: Heather Conkie; Rory Cummings
- Release date: 1987
- Running time: 95 min.
- Country: Canada
- Language: English

Night Friend is a Canadian drama film, directed by Peter Gerretsen and released in 1987. The film stars Chuck Shamata as Fr. Jack Donnell, a Roman Catholic priest who encounters a teen prostitute named Lindsay (Heather Kjollesdal), and tries to save her from life on the streets.

The cast also includes Daniel MacIvor as Lindsay's boyfriend Lenny, Jayne Eastwood as a bag lady, and Art Carney as the monsignor.

Eastwood received a Genie Award nomination for Best Supporting Actress at the 9th Genie Awards.
