= Rebel High =

- Directed by: Harry Jakobs
- Written by: Harry Jakobs; Evan Keliher (novel)
- Produced by: Harry Jakobs
- Starring: Wayne Flemming; Harvey Berger; Kenny Robinson
- Cinematography: Roger Racine
- Edited by: Nathalie Rossin
- Music by: Joe Jammer; Bat Taylor
- Release date: 1987
- Running time: 92 minutes
- Country: Canada
- Language: English

Rebel High is a 1987 social satire film about the chaos and mayhem that modern western cities' high schools became. It is based on a US novel by Evan Keliher. Made in Canada, most of the cast is obscure and in many cases uncredited.

== Plot ==
The film starts as high school students return from spring break. Also, the new principal Edwin Swimper arrives after the last principal died from the stress the school gave him. With teachers teaching empty classes, a constant gang war in the hallway and male teachers wearing various armors, Swimper decides to implement an alternative school policy. As a result, classes such as math are abandoned in favor of classes such as archery. The hallways soon turn into archery ranges. When the gang leader Calvin burns down his office, Swimper abandons his plans and quits on the spot.

The city council gives the teachers one more chance to find a new principal or else the teachers will lose their job as the school would turn into a profitable parking lot. The only candidate is Peckham. When he says he just returned from a long tenure in an African high school and is not up to date with inner city high schools in the west, the vice principal Relic hires him on the spot. In his first day, Packham is amazed to learn the true nature of the school and is especially determined to re-establish the library from its current form of smoke-filled room with no books. However, a gang gun fight in the hallway causes Peckham to lose his consciousness. Relic and another teacher hide him in the janitor's room but he is gone when they return to check on him. Relic assembles the teachers and they decide to hire Sgt. Major, a bearded man with an overcoat and a poodle for a tracking dog. The dog points to the men's toilets. Relic alone is willing to enter it. Once inside, a doorman asks him for a membership card. It is revealed Calvin used the money from the PTA (that never reached Relic's hands) to start a health club in the school's toilets. Relic ends up joining Calvin and his gang in the Jacuzzi and shares their weed.

The city council sends inspectors to rush the fate of the school. Knowing they will never pass, Relic goes back to the toilets/health club to make a deal with Calvin. Three inspectors arrive, one of whom is none other than the returning Edwin Swimper. Although they disapprove the illegality of the chained gates, once inside the school everything looks perfect. Students march in the hallways, the health club is now a fully equipped gym and the library is full of books and even video and audio tapes. Only the cafeteria was not renovated as according to Clavin it belongs to a rival gang. Calvin finds a way to trick the rival gang into a zoo truck, but he needs time. Therefore, Relic distracts the inspectors by taking them to inspect the guidance counselor Ms. Simpson. After she completely fails to help a female student, she suddenly notices Swimper. Mistaking him for her former lover, she runs over and throws herself all over him. Relic uses this chance to discredit him in the eyes of the other inspectors. Swimper claims he has never seen her in his life, but it is too late. The inspectors and Relic leave him behind while she touches his lower regions and tries to force herself on him. After she pulls him down to the floor, Swimper is seen running away from school with her chasing him in the street and shouting for him for the remainder of the movie.

With Swimper and Calvin's rival gang both out of the way, the cafeteria is turned into a fully fledged restaurant. Waiters take orders from the remaining inspectors and unbeknownst to them order themselves from a real restaurant. Taking no chances, they also inject drugs in the food. With the city council outside ready with a construction crew, the inspectors are high enough to pass the school and thus abolish the city council's plan. Relic lives up to his part of the deal and lets Calvin's ever present gang finally graduate, even with good enough grades to get in a good college. Before Calvin leaves, he introduces to Relic his freshman little brother. The brother immediately blows up Relic's room with dynamite.

== Cast ==
- Wayne Flemming as Norman Relic
- Harvey Berger as Edwin Swimper
- Kenny Robinson as Calvin Hampster
- Ben Kaye as Coach Boyle
- David L. McCallum as Samuel Wilcox
- Shirley Merovitz as Ms. Green
- Ralph Millman as Harvey Schlepper
- Carol Shamy as Amy
- Stu Trivax as Peckham
- Tim Cahill as Ida
- Cha Cha Da Vinci as Billie Braxton
- Pierre Larocque as Bruno Bratagula
- Sherwood Kendall as Ralph Brodie
- Peter Kreisman as Alan Kretchmer
