= Marie in the City =

- French: Marie s'en va-t-en ville
- Directed by: Marquise Lepage
- Written by: Marquise Lepage
- Produced by: François Bouvier
- Starring: Frédérique Collin; Geneviève Lenoir
- Cinematography: Daniel Jobin
- Edited by: Yves Chaput
- Music by: Michel Rivard
- Production company: Les Productions du lundi matin
- Release date: 1987
- Running time: 80 minutes
- Country: Canada
- Language: French

Marie in the City (French: Marie s'en va-t-en ville) is a Canadian drama film, directed by Marquise Lepage and released in 1987. The film stars Frédérique Collin as Sarah, a prostitute in Montreal who befriends Marie (Geneviève Lenoir), a runaway teenager.

The film garnered four Genie Award nominations at the 9th Genie Awards in 1988: Best Actress (Collin), Best Director (Lepage), Best Art Direction or Production Design (François Séguin) and Best Costume Design (Nicole Pelletier).
