= Brother André (film) =

1987 Canadian drama film

- French: Le Frère André
- Directed by: Jean-Claude Labrecque
- Written by: Guy Dufresne; Pierre Valcour
- Produced by: Pierre Valcour
- Starring: Marc Legault; Sylvie Ferlatte
- Cinematography: Michel Caron
- Edited by: André Corriveau
- Music by: Joël-Vincent Bienvenue
- Production company: Les Productions de la Montagne
- Distributed by: J.-A, Lapointe Films
- Release date: August 12, 1987
- Running time: 87 minutes
- Country: Canada
- Language: French

Brother André (French: Le Frère André) is a Canadian biographical drama film, directed by Jean-Claude Labrecque and released in 1987. The film centres on the life of André Bessette (Marc Legault), a Roman Catholic lay brother who was widely credited with many miraculous healings, centring in particular on his interaction with his niece Marie-Esther (Sylvie Ferlatte) following a Eucharistic Congress in 1910.

The film's cast also includes Jean Coutu, Raymond Cloutier, André Cailloux, Michel Cailloux, René Caron, Guy Provost, Guy Thauvette, Linda Sorgini, Diane Lavallée, Jean-Pierre Bergeron and Guillaume Lemay-Thivierge.

The film received three Genie Award nominations at the 9th Genie Awards in 1988, for Best Art Direction/Production Design (Ronald Fauteux), Best Costume Design (Denis Sperdouklis) and Best Sound Editing (Diane Boucher, Marcel Pothier, Viateur Paiement, Jo Caron and Antoine Morin).
