= Fran Gebhard =

Canadian actress and theatre director

- Education: University of British Columbia (MFA)
- Occupation(s): Actress, director, and professor

Fran Gebhard is a Canadian actress and theatre director. She is most noted for her performance in the 1987 film Blue City Slammers, for which she received a Genie Award nomination for Best Supporting Actress at the 9th Genie Awards. She is currently a professor at the University of Victoria.

== Career ==
Gebhard has had supporting or guest roles in the films A Piano for Mrs. Cimino, Police Academy 3: Back in Training, Love and Murder, Ernest Goes to School and Case 39, and the television series Check It Out!, Friday the 13th: The Series, T. and T., The Dead Zone, The Chris Isaak Show and The L Word. As a director, her work has included productions of You're a Good Man, Charlie Brown, Wreckage, The School for Scandal, Crackpot, The Affections of May, Twelfth Night, For the Pleasure of Seeing Her Again and A Midsummer Night's Dream.

She has also been associated with the Banff Centre for Arts and Creativity, including as program head of the Playwrights' Colony and coordinator of the Screenwriters' Workshop.

Gebhard has often served as a festival adjudicator for Theatre BC's regional zone festivals. Gebhard adjudicated the 2014 North Island Zone Drama Festival. In 2015, she was the Main Stage Adjudicator for Kamloops. Gebhard adjudicated the Fraser Valley Zone Festival in 2017. In 2018, she adjudicated the Kitimat Drama Festival. She served as the Main Stage Adjudicator in Vernon in 2022.

A theatre professor at the University of Victoria, Gebhard has directed productions for the university's Phoenix Theatre. In 2016, she directed Les Liaisons Dangereuses. She directed Morris Panych's 7 Stories in 2019. In 2021, Gebhard directed George F. Walker's Problem Child and Sarah Ruhl's Dead Man's Cell Phone.

Gebhard has also directed several productions for Victoria's Blue Bridge Repertory Theatre including The Importance of Being Earnest (2016), Barefoot in the Park (2019), and Salt Water Moon (2021)

== Filmography ==
=== Film ===
Year	Title	Role	Notes
1986	Police Academy 3: Back in Training	Woman at Cafe	
1988	Blue City Slammers	Barb	
1990	Love & Murder	Wilma Evans	
1994	Ernest Goes to School	Miss Cosgrove	
2009	Case 39	Coordinator	

=== Television ===
Year	Title	Role	Notes
1982	A Piano for Mrs. Cimino	Gloria Cimino	Television film
1983	The Shaft of Love	Nurse with Thermometer	Television film
1985	Check It Out!	Lady Shopper	Episode: "Seven Days Make One Week"
1986	The Ray Bradbury Theater	Neighbour	Episode: "The Screaming Woman"
1987	Walking on Air	Jason's Mom	Television film
1988	Friday the 13th: The Series	Bradley / Marlene	2 episodes
1990	T. and T.	Marlene Nesmith	Episode: "A Lesson in Values"
1990	Personals	Melody	Television film
1992	Shame	Betty	Television film
1993	The Substitute	Female Teacher	Television film
2001	Wolf Lake	Nurse	Episode: "Excitable Boy"
2002	The Dead Zone	Henrietta Dodd	2 episodes
2002, 2004	The Chris Isaak Show	Debbie / Betty	2 episodes
2007	The L Word	Connie	Episode: "Little Boy Blue"
