= Velcrow Ripper =

Canadian filmmaker and writer (born 1963)

- Born: Steve Ripper; October 20, 1963 (age 62); Gibsons, British Columbia
- Occupation: Documentarian
- Years active: 1990s-present
- Notable work: Bones of the Forest, Scared Sacred, Fierce Light: When Spirit Meets Action, Occupy Love

Velcrow Ripper (born October 20, 1963, in Gibsons, British Columbia) is a Canadian documentarian, writer, and public speaker, best known for his Genie Award-winning 2006 film Scared Sacred and its successor, Fierce Light: When Spirit Meets Action. His 1995 feature documentary, Bones of the Forest, won twelve major awards, including a Genie Award, and Best of the Festival at the Hot Docs Canadian International Documentary Festival. Many of his films examine the intersection of spirituality and politics.

He has also been a contributor to ascent and Shambhala Sun magazines, which explore similar issues. His writing has also appeared in the anthologies, We are Everywhere and Dam Nation.

He is a co-founder of the Gulf Islands Film and Television School, and has taught film at Emily Carr Institute of Art and Design, and at the Ontario College of Art and Design. He also teaches workshops and lectures on the themes of spirituality and activism.

Born Steve Ripper, he was raised in British Columbia as a member of the Baháʼí Faith. He adopted the nickname Velcrow while participating in punk rock culture in his youth.

He currently lives in Gibsons, British Columbia.

== Films ==
- I'm Happy. You're Happy. We're all happy. Happy, happy, happy. (1990)
- The Road Stops Here (1994)
- Bones of the Forest (co-directed with Heather Frise) (1995)
- Open Season (1998)
- In the Company of Fear (1999)
- Scared Sacred (2006)
- Fierce Light: When Spirit Meets Action (2009)
- Occupy Love (2012)
- Metamorphosis (co-directed with Nova Ami) (2018)
- Incandescence (co-directed with Nova Ami) (2024)
