= Maruska Stankova =

Czech-Canadian actress (1934–2000)

Maruska Stankova (Czech: Maruška Staňková) (February 17, 1934 - August 31, 2000) was a Czech-Canadian actress and drama teacher. She was most noted for her performance in the film Dreams Beyond Memory, for which she received a Genie Award nomination for Best Supporting Actress at the 9th Genie Awards, and as a teacher of filmmaking workshops through the National Film Board of Canada.

Born in Prague, she had roles in Czech theatre, most notably with Laterna Magika, before moving to Canada with her husband Záviš Zeman in 1967. She taught herself English by writing a romance novel titled Magic of Love, although it was never published. Her first prominent acting role in Canada was as Mata Hari in an episode of the docudrama series Witness to Yesterday. She had a number of guest and supporting roles in film and television in the 1970s, 1980s and 1990s.

For many years she taught the Directing, Acting and Writing for Camera workshop, teaching many of Canada's prominent filmmakers, screenwriters and actors of the era. Late in her career she was nominated for the Order of Canada, although she died before she could be inducted. She was posthumously honoured by the Toronto chapter of Women in Film and Television International, with its award for excellence in professional development.

== Filmography ==
Year	Title	Role	Notes
1972	Et du fils		
1979	Quintet	Jaspera	
1981	The Amateur	Eva Lakos	
1983	Hey Babe!	Miss Wolf	
1984	Mrs. Soffel	Mrs. Bodyne	
1988	Dreams Beyond Memory	Olga	
1992	Diplomatic Immunity	Interviewer	
