= A Cargo to Africa =

- Theatrical Poster
- Directed by: Roger Cantin
- Produced by: Rock Demers; Chantal Lafleur
- Starring: Julien Adam; Carl Alacchi; Manuel Aranguiz; Claude Aubin
- Cinematography: Philippe Lavalette
- Edited by: Roger Cantin
- Music by: Ned Bouhalassa
- Production company: Les Productions La Fête
- Distributed by: K Films Amérique
- Release date: August 2009 (Montreal)
- Running time: 90 minutes
- Country: Canada
- Languages: English; French

A Cargo to Africa (French: Un cargo pour l'Afrique) is a 2009 Canadian film directed by Roger Cantin.

== Plot ==
Returning to Canada after a 20-year exile in Africa, where he dedicated himself to humanitarian work, Norbert, a former revolutionary, longs to go home. Caught in the Canadian bureaucratic system, he considers stowing away on a cargo ship. Before leaving, he meets a young boy, Christophe, a juvenile delinquent who insists on finding a home for Trotsky, the capuchin monkey Norbert is forced to abandon before boarding the ship. Christophe convinces Norbert to take Trotsky to the zoo and drop him off at his mother's house near Quebec City, where Norbert will have to catch the cargo ship that has left without him.

== See also ==
- Cinema of Quebec
- Cinema of Canada
