= Family Viewing =

- Directed by: Atom Egoyan
- Written by: Atom Egoyan
- Produced by: Atom Egoyan
- Starring: see below
- Cinematography: Robert MacDonald (director of photography); Peter Mettler
- Edited by: Atom Egoyan; Bruce McDonald
- Music by: Mychael Danna
- Distributed by: Cinephile (1988) (North America theatrical); Angel Films (Denmark theatrical)
- Release date: October 2, 1987 (Canada)
- Running time: 86 minutes
- Country: Canada
- Language: English
- Budget: $ 160,000 (estimated)

Family Viewing is a 1987 Canadian drama film. The second feature directed by Atom Egoyan, it stars David Hemblen, Aidan Tierney, Gabrielle Rose, Arsinée Khanjian, and Selma Keklikian. The plot follows a young man from a dysfunctional family who fakes his beloved grandmother's death with the help of a phone sex worker, as his home movie-obsessed father dominates his life.

== Plot ==
Van (Tierney) frequently visits his grandmother, Armen (Keklikian) who is living in a poor quality nursing home. There, he meets Aline (Khanjian), whose mother (Sabourin) is in the bed next to Armen. Aline's job as a phone sex worker does not pay enough to afford a better nursing home for her mother. Van and Aline get to know each other through their frequent meetings at the nursing home. Van's mother (Sarkisyan) disappeared years ago and his father, Stan (Hemblen), is reluctant to visit his mother-in-law. Stan does go to visit Armen once, but he first visits with a stranger because he does not even know what she looks like. When he finally sees Armen, she attacks him. Van tries to convince his father to allow Armen to live with them, but he refuses. Van also unsuccessfully tries to convince Sandra, Stan's live-in lover (Rose), to help him convince his father but she also refuses.

Van discovers that Stan is re-using old home movies to tape himself having sex with Sandra. Van decides to switch the tapes for blank ones to save them, bringing them to the nursing home to show to Armen. When Aline is asked by a client to travel with him to Montreal, she asks Van to look after her mother while she is away. Aline's mother, believing that Aline is deserting her, commits suicide by overdosing on her medicine. Van switches the two elderly women so it appears that his grandmother has died, then tells his father that Armen has died and holds a funeral for Aline's mother before she returns from Montreal. Van tells her what he has done and shows her a videotape of the funeral, asking her to help him to get Armen out of the nursing home, as Armen's identity is now Aline's mother. Aline also agrees to put up Armen in her flat as long as the rent is shared and then agrees to allow Van to leave his father's house and move in too. Van's father helps him get a job in a hotel and Aline gets a job there, too. Van, while watching the tapes, discovers images of his mother being tied up by Stan as a part of their sexual activities.

Stan discovers that Van switched the tapes and wants to get them back. Sandra visits Van to tell him that Stan, having seen Aline at the nursing home and putting flowers on what he thinks is his mother-in-law's grave, is suspicious and hires a private detective (Shafer). Van moves his grandmother to the hotel so she won't be discovered and puts her up in a part of the hotel which is not used out of season. Stan visits Aline and questions her about her mother without results. With the private detective's help, Stan tracks down the room where Armen is being kept. Before he can get there, Van finds out that the room is needed by the hotel and responds by reporting Armen as a homeless woman who has been staying in a storage area. As a result, Armen is removed by medical personnel and moved to a different and better nursing home. In the final scene, Van and Aline visit Armen and find her sitting and talking with Van's mother - her daughter.

== Cast ==
- David Hemblen
- Aidan Tierney
- Gabrielle Rose
- Arsinée Khanjian
- Selma Keklikian
- Jeanne Sabourin
- Rose Sarkisyan
- Vasag Baghboudarian
- David MacKay
- Hrant Alianak
- John Shafer
- Garfield Andrews
- Edwin Stephenson
- Aino Pirskanen
- Souren Chekijian
- Johnnie Eisen
- John Pellatt

== Recognition ==
- 1987
  - Toronto International Film Festival Best Canadian Feature Film - Won
- 1988
  - Genie Award for Best Achievement in Direction - Atom Egoyan - Nominated
  - Genie Award for Best Achievement in Editing - Atom Egoyan, Bruce MacDonald - Nominated
  - Genie Award for Best Motion Picture - Atom Egoyan - Nominated
  - Genie Award for Best Music Score - Mychael Danna - Nominated
  - Genie Award for Best Performance by an Actor in a Leading Role - David Hemblen - Nominated
  - Genie Award for Best Performance by an Actor in a Supporting Role - Hrant Alianak - Nominated
  - Genie Award for Best Performance by an Actress in a Leading Role - Gabrielle Rose - Nominated
  - Genie Award for Best Original Screenplay - Atom Egoyan - Nominated

== Sources ==
- Ontario Film Review Board
