= Murray Westgate =

Canadian actor (1918–2018)

- Born: April 16, 1918; Regina, Saskatchewan, Canada
- Died: August 27, 2018 (aged 100); Toronto, Ontario, Canada
- Occupation: Actor
- Years active: 1940s–1991
- Spouse: Alice Hill (? - 1983)

Murray Westgate (April 16, 1918 – August 27, 2018) was a Canadian actor. He is best known for his longtime role as a television pitchman in Canadian commercials for Esso on Hockey Night in Canada in the 1950s and 1960s, and also for his roles in Blue City Slammers, for which he garnered a Genie Award nomination as Best Supporting Actor at the 9th Genie Awards in 1988, and in the film adaptation of Two Solitudes, in which he portrayed the Prime Minister of Canada.

== Early life ==
Before becoming an actor, Westgate served as a radio operator in the Royal Canadian Navy during World War II. He then moved to Vancouver to join Everyman Theatre as an actor, before joining CBC Radio as an actor in radio dramas.

== Career ==
Westgate began appearing in Esso commercials in 1952, when the company signed on as the main commercial sponsor of Hockey Night in Canada, and retained this role until 1968.

He also had roles in the television series Jake and the Kid, R.C.M.P., Seaway, House of Pride and Seeing Things, and had some guest and supporting roles in television and theatrical films, but found that he sometimes lost out on roles because he was too recognisably typecast by the Esso commercials. He won an ACTRA Award in 1979 for his performance in the CBC Television film Tyler.

He was inducted into the Canadian Association of Broadcasters Hall of Fame in 2002.

Westgate's final acting job was in 1991, at the age of 72, a reprise of his Esso attendant character for two commercials aired by Imperial Oil during that year's Stanley Cup playoffs. The spots featured both a black-and-white clip of one of his original Esso ads and newly recorded footage.

Westgate turned 100 on April 16, 2018. He died on August 27, 2018, at Sunnybrook Veterans Centre in Toronto, where he had lived for more than a decade.

== Personal life ==
Westgate was married to actress Alice Hill until her death in 1983.

== Filmography ==
Year	Title	Role	Notes
1957	A Dangerous Age	Police Officer	
1959	A Cool Sound from Hell	Police Officer	
1961	Jake and the Kid	Jake	
1969	The First Time	Customs Officer	Uncredited
1969	Change of Mind	Judge Stanton	
1970	Homer	Mr. Cochran	
1972	The Rowdyman	Mr. Lowe	
1973	Class of '44	Principal	
1973	Our Ms. Hammond		
1974	To Kill the King	Vincent O'Connell	
1974	Sunday in the Country	Conway	
1977	Rituals	Pilot	
1978	Two Solitudes	Prime Minister	
1978	Tyler		
1979	Running	Mr. Finlay	
1979	Fish Hawk	Billie Firman	
1979	Bye, See You Monday	Pere de Lucie	
1980	The Kidnapping of the President	Archie Standler	
1981	Happy Birthday to Me	Gatekeeper	
1981	Threshold	Lecture Host	
1981	Silence of the North	Dr. Miller	
1984	Heavenly Bodies	Coach Hudson	
1988	Blue City Slammers	Bill	
1991	Scanners II: The New Order	George Kellum	(final film role)
