= Jesse Nishihata =

Canadian film director

Jesse [Hideo] Nishihata (1929–2006), was a Canadian film director and producer. He worked on documentaries for the CBC, the NFB, and taught film and media studies at Ryerson University. During World War Two, he was interned at Tashme camp.
