= Rock Demers =

Canadian film producer (1933–2021)

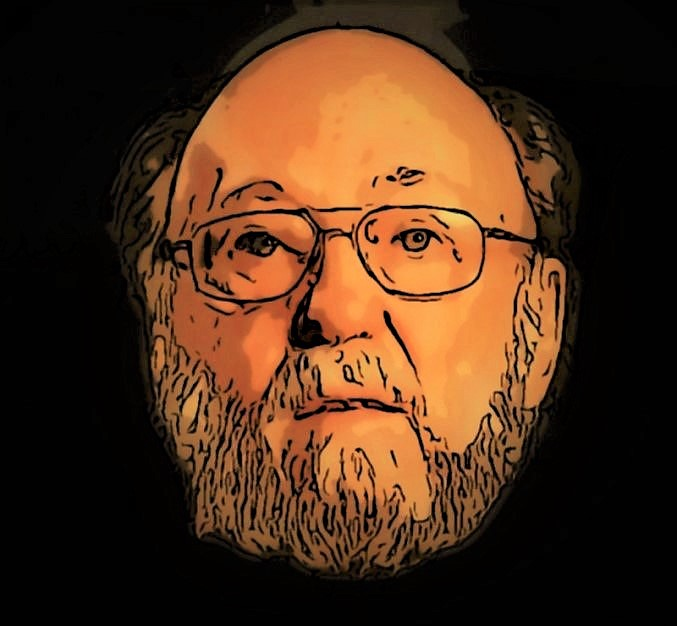
- Born: December 11, 1933; Sainte-Cécile-de-Lévrard, Quebec, Canada
- Died: August 17, 2021 (aged 87); Montreal, Quebec, Canada
- Awards: Order of Canada; Governor General's Performing Arts Award

Rock Demers, CC (December 11, 1933 – August 17, 2021) was a Canadian film producer. He was the founder of the film company Les Productions la Fête and produced the Tales for All film series for children.

== Early life ==
Demers was born in Sainte-Cécile-de-Lévrard, Quebec, on December 11, 1933. He was raised in rural Quebec, and described his childhood as "very poor, but very happy". He initially studied to become a teacher, before obtaining a diploma in audio-visual technology at the École Normale de St. Cloud in Paris. He then travelled around Europe and Asia for two years, during which he became acquainted with Vojta Jasny, Břetislav Pojar, and Krzysztof Zanussi.

== Career ==
After returning to Canada, Demers started his career in the film industry. He began with film distribution in 1960, before becoming manager of the Montreal World Film Festival two years later, serving in that capacity until 1967. He co-established the Cinémathèque québécoise in 1963 and started Faroun Films in 1965. Initially focusing on the distribution of children's films, the latter company eventually expanded to art and experimental film as well as production. Demers left Faroun Films in 1978, one year after being appointed president, and later director general, of the Institut Québécois du Cinéma (IQC).

Demers quit the IQC in June 1979 and went on to create Les Productions la Fête the following year. Now able to produce his own films, he developed the Tales for All (Contes pour tous) film series. He envisioned twelve films and had already commissioned scripts for eight of them prior to the commencement of filming for the first. The first film in the series, The Dog Who Stopped the War (La guerre des tuques), was influenced by an article that Demers read in La Presse covering youth suicide. The films were eventually co-produced overseas, and translated into other languages. The series released 24 feature films under Demers's leadership, with the last (The Outlaw League) being released in 2014.

Demers sold Productions La Fête to Dominic James in 2015.

== Awards and honors ==
Demers was awarded the Prix Albert-Tessier in 1987 by the government of Quebec. He was appointed an officer of the Order of Canada in November 1991, before being promoted to companion in May 2007. He received the Governor General's Performing Arts Award, Canada's highest honour in the performing arts, in 1998. Demers was also conferred the Ordre des Arts et des Lettres, as well as the Giffoni Film Festival's François Truffaut Award.

== Later life ==
He died shortly after midnight on August 17, 2021, at the Montreal Heart Institute. He was 87, and suffered from heart failure complications prior to his death.

== Selected filmography ==
- The Christmas Martian (Le Martien de Noël) - 1971
- Maria Chapdelaine - 1983, appeared in film as an actor
- The Dog Who Stopped the War (La Guerre des tuques) - 1985
- The Peanut Butter Solution - 1985
- Bach and Broccoli (Bach et Bottine) - 1986, also appeared as an actor
- The Young Magician (Le Jeune Magicien) - 1987
- The Great Land of Small - 1987
- The Tadpole and the Whale (La Grenouille et la baleine) - 1988
- Tommy Tricker and the Stamp Traveller (Les Aventurier du Timbre Perdu) - 1988
- Bye Bye, Red Riding Hood (Bye bye chaperon rouge) - 1989
- Vincent and Me (Vincent et moi) - 1990
- Reach for the Sky (La Championne) - 1990
- The Case of the Witch Who Wasn't (Pas de répit pour Mélanie) - 1990, also appeared as an actor
- The Clean Machine (Tirelire Combines & Cie) - 1992, also appeared as an actor
- The Return of Tommy Tricker - 1994
- Hathi, the Elephant - 2000
- The Hidden Fortress (La Forteresse suspendue) - 2001
- Summer with the Ghosts - 2003
- A Cargo to Africa (Un cargo pour l'Afrique) - 2009
