= The Groove Kings =

Canadian band

- Origin: Montreal, Quebec, Canada
- Genres: Blues rock, soul, R&B
- Years active: 1992–present
- Labels: Virtual; Opulent; Wise To You; North Star
- Awards: Canadian Smooth Jazz Awards – Group/Duo of the Year; 2010
- Members: Irene Marc; Howard Forman
- Website: groovekings.ca

The Groove Kings are a Canadian band from Montreal, Quebec, consisting of Irene Marc (lead singer), and Howard Forman. Marc and Forman founded the band in 1992; they have released three albums and their CDs produced top-40 and top-20 hits through the 1990s.

== History ==
The Groove Kings formed in 1992 and released their first self-titled album in 1993. The album was released in Canada by the label Virtual Music, then in 1994 in Australia by Opulent Music. The single from this album was "Everybody Knows".

In 1994, the band released their second album, Into the Groove Age, on Wise To You Music. The single "Tell Me" appeared on the RPM Top Singles and Adult Contemporary charts regularly during 1994 and 1995.

In November 2009, their third full-length album Blood Red was released by the UK's North Star Music Publishing.

On April 23, 2010, Groove Kings were voted Group/Duo of the Year at the Canadian Smooth Jazz Awards. Forman had been nominated for Best Original Composition, Marc had been nominated Female Vocalist of the Year, and Blood Red had been nominated Album of the Year.
