= Train of Dreams =

1987 film by John N. Smith

- Directed by: John N. Smith
- Written by: Sally Bochner; John N. Smith; Sam Grana
- Produced by: Sam Grana
- Starring: Jason St. Amour; Christopher Neil; Frederick Eugene Ward
- Music by: Three O'Clock Train
- Distributed by: National Film Board of Canada
- Release date: 22 October 1987 (Chicago International Film Festival)
- Running time: 88 minutes
- Country: Canada
- Language: English

Train of Dreams is a 1987 Canadian film directed by John N. Smith and starring Jason St. Amour, Christopher Neil and Frederick Eugene Ward as a popular teacher. In this documentary-style drama, a delinquent teenager tries to put his life on the right track.

== Awards ==
The film won the Special Jury Prize at the Chicago International Film Festival in 1987, and was nominated for four Genie Awards in 1988. Jason St. Amour also won the Best Actor award at the Paris Film Festival in 1989.
