= Mireille Dansereau =

Canadian director and screenwriter

- Born: 19 December 1943 (age 82); Montreal, Quebec, Canada
- Occupations: Film director Screenwriter
- Years active: 1967 - Present

Mireille Dansereau (born December 19, 1943) is a Canadian director and screenwriter who is known for "emulating the style and approach of her aesthetic role model, John Cassavetes". Her career spans over 50 years and has earned her several accolades.

== Biography ==
Mireille Dansereau was a dancer for 15 years before turning to filmmaking. After finishing her studies at the University of Montreal, she made her first film, a short entitled Moi, un jour... for Expo 67. The film was well received and enabled her to move to London, England to attend the Royal College of Art. She obtained her master's degree in Film and Television and made another short film, Compromise, which won first prize at the 1969 Great Britain Student Film Festival. Dansereau worked a variety of jobs - researcher, script assistant, sound recorder - before returning to Quebec. There, she co-founded L’Association Coopérative des Productions Audio-visuelles (ACPAV) and became the first woman in Quebec to direct a fiction feature film in the private sector; the film, La vie rêvée (1971) was produced by the ACPAV and became a landmark that received a wide theatrical release and national critical acclaim.

Dream Life was the first privately produced feature film in Canada to be directed by a woman.

She joined the NFB following her success and directed 2 feature documentaries for the En tant que femmes Series, J'me marie, j'me marie pas (1973) and Famille et variations (1977). She returned to the private sector to direct her next fiction feature, L'Arrache-Coeur (1979), a bleak, and penetrating examination of a marriage in crisis which earned Dansereau a Genie Award for Best Screenplay nomination, and Le Sourd dans la ville (1987), a dark, disturbing and experimental adaptation of Marie-Claire Blais's novel centered on a rooming house.

In 2022, she was named the winner of the Prix Albert-Tessier for lifetime achievement in the film industry.

== Filmography ==
=== Fiction ===
- Moi, un jour... (Short film, 1967)
- Compromise (Short film, 1968)
- Coccinelle (Short film, 1970)
- Dream Life (La Vie rêvée) (1972)
- Le Père idéal (Short film, 1974)
- Rappelle-toi (Short film co-directed with Vartkes Cholokian, 1975)
- Heartbreak (L'Arrache-cœur) (1979)
- Deaf to the City (Le sourd dans la ville) (1987)
- Duo pour une soliste (1997)
- O comme obsession (aka O-Obsession) (Short film, 1999)
- La vie d'abord (Short film, 1999)
- L'idée noire (Short film, 2000)

=== Documentaries ===
- Forum (1968)
- Les marchés de Londres (Short film, 1969)
- Couples - Étude pour un lit et une baignoire (Short film, 1971)
- J'me marie, j'me marie pas (1972)
- Famille et variations (1977)
- Germaine Guèvremont (Short film, 1980)
- Les Baltes à la recherche d'un pays (1980)
- Les Nordiques ou un peuple sans artifice (1980)
- Un pays à comprendre (1981)
- Le Frère André (1982)
- Entre elle et moi (Short film, 1992)
- Les seins dans la tête (Short film, 1994)
- Les cheveux en quatre (Short film, 1996)
- Danny le montagnais (Short film, 2001)
- Eva (Short film, 2003)
- Louisiane, pour mémoire (2005)
- Les cerisiers ont envahi les espaces comme incendie (Short film, 2010)

== Works cited ==
- Marshall, Bill (2001). Quebec National Cinema. McGill–Queen's University Press. ISBN 0-7735-2103-8.
