= Les chansons en or =

Greatest hits album by Celine Dion
- Released: 22 April 1986
- Recorded: 1981–1986
- Studios: C.B.E. (Paris); Family Sound (Paris); Marylin (Boucherville); Montmartre (Paris); St‑Charles (Longueuil)
- Genre: Pop
- Length: 39:51
- Language: French
- Label: TBS
- Producers: René Angélil; Paul Baillargeon; Daniel Hétu; Marcel Lefebvre; Eddy Marnay; Rudi Pascal

Celine Dion chronology
Céline Dion en concert (1985)	Les chansons en or (1986)	Incognito (1987)

Singles from Les chansons en or
- 1. "Fais ce que tu voudras" Released: June 1986

Les chansons en or (lit. 'The golden songs') is the second greatest hits album by Canadian singer Celine Dion. Released in Quebec, Canada on 22 April 1986 through TBS and distributed by Trans‑Canada Disques, the compilation presents Dion's most commercially successful early singles, drawn from her first five studio albums. It also includes one new track, "Fais ce que tu voudras". The album reached number 15 on the Quebec chart.

== Background and conception ==
At age 18, Dion released her second greatest hits compilation, Les chansons en or. The album compiles material from her early discography: La voix du bon Dieu (1981), Tellement j'ai d'amour... (1982), Les chemins de ma maison (1983), Mélanie (1984), and C'est pour toi (1985).

The compilation includes Dion's Quebec chart‑toppers "D'amour ou d'amitié" and "Mon ami m'a quittée", along with several top‑10 singles: "Une colombe", "Tellement j'ai d'amour pour toi", "C'est pour toi", "Mon rêve de toujours", and her debut single "Ce n'était qu'un rêve".

The new song, "Fais ce que tu voudras", has lyrics by Eddy Marnay and music by Quebec composer René Grignon, who submitted the demo to Dion's management. The single peaked at number 36 in Quebec, and its music video, directed by François Girard, was nominated for Video of the Year at the 1987 Félix Awards.

== Track listing ==
No.	Title	Writer(s)	Producer(s)	Length
1.	"Ce n'était qu'un rêve"	Thérèse Dion; Celine Dion; Jacques Dion	René Angélil; Daniel Hétu	3:49
2.	"La voix du bon Dieu"	Eddy Marnay	Marnay; Angélil	3:15
3.	"Tellement j'ai d'amour pour toi"	Marnay; Hubert Giraud	Marnay; Rudi Pascal	2:57
4.	"D'amour ou d'amitié"	Marnay; Jean-Pierre Lang; Roland Vincent	Marnay; Pascal	3:58
5.	"Mon ami m'a quittée"	Marnay; Christian Loigerot; Thierry Geoffroy	Marnay; Pascal	3:00
6.	"Les chemins de ma maison"	Marnay; Patrick Lemaître; Alain Bernard	Marnay; Pascal	4:15
7.	"Mon rêve de toujours"	Marnay; Jean-Pierre Goussaud	Marnay; Pascal	4:17
8.	"Mélanie"	Marnay; Diane Juster	Angélil	3:43
9.	"Une colombe"	Marcel Lefebvre; Paul Baillargeon	Baillargeon; Lefebvre; Angélil	3:08
10.	"C'est pour toi"	Marnay; François Orenn	Marnay; Pascal	4:01
11.	"Fais ce que tu voudras"	Marnay; René Grignon	Marnay	3:42
Total length:				39:51

== Charts ==
Chart performance
Chart (1986)	Peak position
Quebec Albums (ADISQ)	15

== Release history ==
Release history
Region	Date	Label	Format(s)	Catalog	Ref.
Canada	22 April 1986	TBS	Cassette; vinyl	TBS4‑507; TBS 507	
Canada	1990	TBS	CD	TBSCD‑507	
