= The Early Singles (Celine Dion album) =

Compilation album by Celine Dion
- Released: 21 February 2000
- Recorded: 1981–1988
- Genre: Pop
- Length: 69:29
- Label: BR Music
- Producers: René Angélil; Didier Barbelivien; Daniel Hétu; Urs Peter Keller; Eddy Marnay; Romano Musumarra; Rudi Pascal; Atilla Şereftuğ

Celine Dion chronology
All the Way... A Decade of Song (1999)	The Early Singles (2000)	The Collector's Series, Volume One (2000)

The Early Singles is a French-language compilation album by Canadian singer Celine Dion, released in selected European countries in 2000. It includes 19 songs recorded between 1981 and 1988, among them tracks from Dion's debut album, "Ce n'était qu'un rêve" and "L'amour viendra". The compilation also contains the Eurovision-winning song "Ne partez pas sans moi" and its instrumental version.

== Background and release ==
The Early Singles includes all the singles and their B-sides released in France in the 1980s, except for "Incognito" and the 12-inch version of "Je ne veux pas". After numerous compilations of Dion's early French-language recordings, The Early Singles became the first to include "Ce n'était qu'un rêve", "L'amour viendra", and the instrumental version of "Ne partez pas sans moi". The album was later reissued as Les hits.

== Critical reception ==
AllMusic rated it two and a half out of five stars.

== Track listing ==
No.	Title	Writer(s)	Producer(s)	Length
1.	"Ce n'était qu'un rêve"	Thérèse Dion; Celine Dion; Jacques Dion	Daniel Hétu; René Angélil	3:47
2.	"L'amour viendra"	Eddy Marnay; Amerigo Paolo Cassella; Dario Baldan Bembo	Marnay; Angélil	4:20
3.	"D'amour ou d'amitié"	Marnay; Jean-Pierre Lang; Roland Vincent	Marnay; Rudi Pascal	4:00
4.	"Visa pour les beaux jours"	Marnay; Christian Loigerot; Thierry Geoffroy	Marnay; Pascal	3:25
5.	"Mon ami m'a quittée"	Marnay; Loigerot; Geoffroy	Marnay; Pascal	3:00
6.	"La dodo la do"	Marnay; Christian Gaubert	Marnay; Pascal	3:02
7.	"Ne me plaignez pas"	Marnay; Steve Thompson	Marnay; Pascal	3:41
8.	"Mon rêve de toujours"	Marnay; Jean-Pierre Goussaud	Marnay; Pascal	4:19
9.	"Les oiseaux du bonheur"	Marnay; André Popp	Marnay; Pascal	3:39
10.	"C'est pour vivre"	Marnay; Popp	Marnay; Pascal	4:02
11.	"Avec toi"	Marnay; Loigerot; Geoffroy	Marnay; Pascal	3:28
12.	"Billy"	Marnay; Patrick Lemaître	Marnay	3:05
13.	"En amour"	Marnay; Loigerot; Geoffroy	Marnay	3:14
14.	"Je ne veux pas"	Marnay; Romano Musumarra	Musumarra	4:02
15.	"Comment t'aimer"	Marnay; Musumarra	Musumarra	4:01
16.	"La religieuse"	Didier Barbelivien	Barbelivien	3:28
17.	"C'est pour toi"	Marnay; François Orenn	Marnay; Pascal	4:02
18.	"Ne partez pas sans moi"	Nella Martinetti; Atilla Şereftuğ	Urs Peter Keller; Şereftuğ	3:08
19.	"Ne partez pas sans moi" (instrumental)	Martinetti; Şereftuğ	Keller; Şereftuğ	3:08
Total length:				69:29

== Release history ==
Release history
Region	Date	Label	Format	Catalog
Europe	21 February 2000	BR Music	CD	BX 530–2
