= Les plus grands succès de Céline Dion =

Greatest hits album by Celine Dion
- Released: 17 September 1984
- Recorded: 1981–1983
- Studios: Marylin (Boucherville); Montmartre (Paris); St‑Charles (Longueuil)
- Genre: Pop
- Length: 31:09
- Language: French
- Label: TBS
- Producers: René Angélil; Daniel Hétu; Eddy Marnay; Rudi Pascal

Celine Dion chronology
Mélanie (1984)	Les plus grands succès de Céline Dion (1984)	Les oiseaux du bonheur (1984)

Les plus grands succès de Céline Dion (lit. 'Celine Dion's greatest hits') is the first greatest hits album by Canadian singer Celine Dion. Released in Quebec, Canada on 17 September 1984 through TBS and distributed by Trans‑Canada Disques, the compilation brings together selections from Dion's first five studio albums, recorded between 1981 and 1983. A portion of the album's proceeds was donated to the Quebec Cystic Fibrosis Association, reflecting the Dion family's long‑standing support for the organization.

== Background and conception ==
Dion launched Les plus grands succès de Céline Dion on 17 September 1984 at the Centre hospitalier universitaire Sainte-Justine in Montreal. The album was sold primarily through Steinberg's supermarkets, with part of the profits benefiting the Quebec Cystic Fibrosis Association. This charitable initiative added a philanthropic aspect to the release, linking Dion's growing public profile with a cause important to her family.

== Track listing ==
No.	Title	Writer(s)	Producer(s)	Length
1.	"Ce n'était qu'un rêve"	Thérèse Dion; Celine Dion; Jacques Dion	René Angélil; Daniel Hétu	3:47
2.	"La voix du bon Dieu"	Eddy Marnay	Marnay; Angélil	3:10
3.	"Tellement j'ai d'amour pour toi"	Marnay; Hubert Giraud	Marnay; Rudi Pascal	2:56
4.	"D'amour ou d'amitié"	Marnay; Jean-Pierre Lang; Roland Vincent	Marnay; Pascal	3:59
5.	"Glory Alleluia"	André Pascal	Angélil	3:35
6.	"Mon ami m'a quittée"	Marnay; Christian Loigerot; Thierry Geoffroy	Marnay; Pascal	3:00
7.	"Ne me plaignez pas"	Marnay; Steve Thompson	Angélil	3:00
8.	"Un enfant"	Jacques Brel; Gérard Jouannest	Angélil	2:57
9.	"Vivre et donner"	Marnay; Ben Kaye	Angélil	2:28
10.	"Les chemins de ma maison"	Marnay; Patrick Lemaître; Alain Bernard	Marnay; Pascal	4:17
Total length:				31:09

== Release history ==
Release history
Region	Date	Label	Format	Catalog	Ref.
Canada	17 September 1984	TBS	Cassette; vinyl	TBS4‑XX001; TBS XX001	
