= Roger Lebel =

Canadian actor (1923–1994)

Roger Lebel (June 5, 1923 – June 18, 1994) was a Canadian actor.

== Career ==
Label was born in Rivière-du-Loup, Quebec, Canada. A Québécois character actor, Roger Lebel began his career on stage and in radio. He started to show up movies in the mid-1950s, and had supporting roles in important Quebec films such as La Mort d’un bûcheron, Réjeanne Padovani, Gina, Les Bons Débarras and Un Zoo la nuit. He won the Genie Award for best supporting actor in Un Zoo, as the dying father, his last screen appearance.

He won the 1987 Prix Guy-L'Écuyer for Un Zoo la nuit.

== Films ==
- 1952: The Bird Fancier (L'Homme aux oiseaux)
- 1958: Les Mains nettes - Ernest Rivard
- 1961: Dubois et fils
- 1972: Double-sens
- 1973: The Death of a Lumberjack (La Mort d’un bûcheron) - Paper employee union archivist
- 1973: Réjeanne Padovani - Leon Desaulniers
- 1974: Bingo - Champagne
- 1974: Gina - Léonard Chabot
- 1975: The Vultures (Les Vautours) - Armand Bouchard / le député de Limoilou
- 1976: Let's Talk About Love (Parlez-nous d’amour) - Boss de Jeannot
- 1976: The Absence (L'Absence)
- 1977: Panic (Panique)
- 1980: Good Riddance (Les bons débarras) - Maurice
- 1980: The Coffin Affair (L’Affaire Coffin) - Pascal Dion
- 1984: The Years of Dreams and Revolt (Les Années de rêves) - Le député Armand
- 1984: Laurier (TV Mini-Series) - Sir Richard J. Cartwright
- 1984: The Crime of Ovide Plouffe (Le Crime d’Ovide Plouffe)
- 1987: Night Zoo (Un zoo la nuit) - Albert
