= Panic (1977 film) =

1977 Canadian film

- French: Panique
- Directed by: Jean-Claude Lord
- Written by: Jean-Claude Lord; Jean Salvy
- Produced by: Pierre David; René Malo
- Starring: Paule Baillargeon; Jean Coutu; Lise Thouin
- Cinematography: François Protat
- Edited by: Jean-Claude Lord
- Music by: Pierre F. Brault
- Production company: Les Productions Mutuels
- Release date: September 16, 1977
- Running time: 127 minutes
- Country: Canada
- Language: French

Panic (French: Panique) is a Canadian thriller drama film, directed by Jean-Claude Lord and released in 1977. The film centres on a crisis in the fictional city of Port-Champlain, Quebec, after industrial pollution has poisoned the city's drinking water.

The film's cast includes Paule Baillargeon, Jean Coutu, Lise Thouin, Pierre Thériault, Jacques Thisdale, Raymond Lévesque, Gérard Poirier, Jean-Marie Lemieux, Benoît Girard, Claude Michaud, Marc Legault, Pierre Gobeil, J-Léo Gagnon and Roger Lebel.

== Synopsis ==
A major city's drinking water is contaminated by chemicals from a pulp and paper mill, resulting in the death of a child. Initially in charge of communications for the company responsible, Françoise Jelinek ultimately turns against her employer.
