= Mélanie (album) =

Studio album by Celine Dion
- Released: 22 August 1984
- Recorded: 1984
- Studios: Montmartre (Paris); St‑Charles (Longueuil)
- Genre: Pop
- Length: 37:23
- Language: French
- Label: TBS
- Producers: René Angélil; Paul Baillargeon; Marcel Lefebvre; Eddy Marnay; Rudi Pascal

Celine Dion chronology
Chants et contes de Noël (1983)	Mélanie (1984)	Les plus grands succès de Céline Dion (1984)

Singles from Mélanie
- 1. "Une colombe" Released: June 1984; 2. "Mon rêve de toujours" Released: September 1984; 3. "Un amour pour moi" Released: February 1985

Mélanie is the sixth studio album by Canadian singer Celine Dion. Released in Quebec, Canada on 22 August 1984 through TBS and distributed by Trans‑Canada Disques, the album brought together a team of producers, including René Angélil, Eddy Marnay, Rudi Pascal, Paul Baillargeon, and Marcel Lefebvre. The title track was dedicated to Dion's niece Karine, who died from cystic fibrosis. Mélanie topped the Quebec albums chart and was certified gold in Canada. At the 1985 Félix Awards, it received Album of the Year and Best Selling Album of the Year, while its lead single, "Une colombe", reached number two in Quebec, earned gold certification, and won Song of the Year and Best Selling Single of the Year.

== Background and conception ==
The album contains 10 tracks. Eddy Marnay wrote lyrics for nine of them, continuing his long‑standing collaboration with Dion. The closing track, "Une colombe", was composed by Marcel Lefebvre and Paul Baillargeon for the visit of Pope John Paul II to Canada. On 10 September 1984, Dion performed the song before 65,000 people at Montreal's Olympic Stadium, an early milestone in her career. In January 2016, the song "Trois heures vingt" was played during the funeral broadcast of René Angélil, and Dion later included it on her 2016 album Encore un soir.

== Commercial performance ==
Mélanie reached number one in Quebec and remained at the top for 10 consecutive weeks. On 1 November 1984, it was certified gold by the CRIA. The lead single, "Une colombe", peaked at number two and earned a gold certification.

== Accolades ==
At the 1985 Félix Awards, Dion received five awards: Album of the Year (Mélanie), Best Selling Album of the Year (Mélanie), Female Vocalist of the Year, Song of the Year ("Une colombe"), and Best Selling Single of the Year ("Une colombe"). She also received nominations for Pop Album of the Year, Artist of the Year Achieving the Most Success Outside Quebec, and Show of the Year. For their work on "Une colombe", Marcel Lefebvre and Paul Baillargeon were nominated for Author/Composer of the Year, and Baillargeon also received a nomination for Arranger of the Year.

== Track listing ==
No.	Title	Writer(s)	Producer(s)	Length
1.	"Mélanie"	Eddy Marnay; Diane Juster	René Angélil	3:43
2.	"Chante-moi"	Marnay; Alain Noreau	Angélil	3:21
3.	"Un amour pour moi"	Marnay; Christian Loigerot; Thierry Geoffroy	Marnay; Rudi Pascal	3:20
4.	"Trop jeune à dix-sept ans"	Marnay; Paul Greedus; Barry Blue	Marnay; Pascal	4:40
5.	"Mon rêve de toujours"	Marnay; Jean-Pierre Goussaud	Marnay; Pascal	4:17
6.	"Va où s'en va l'amour"	Marnay; Noreau	Angélil	3:20
7.	"Comme on disait avant"	Marnay; Noreau	Angélil	3:30
8.	"Benjamin"	Marnay; Pierre Papadiamandis	Marnay; Pascal	4:30
9.	"Trois heures vingt"	Marnay; Patrick Lemaître	Marnay; Pascal	3:34
10.	"Une colombe"	Marcel Lefebvre; Paul Baillargeon	Baillargeon; Lefebvre; Angélil	3:08
Total length:				37:23

== Charts ==
Chart performance
Chart (1984)	Peak position
Quebec Albums (ADISQ)	1

== Certifications ==
Certifications
Region	Certification	Certified units/sales
Canada (Music Canada)	Gold	50,000^{^}
^{^} Shipments figures based on certification alone.

== Release history ==
Release history
Region	Date	Label	Format	Catalog	Ref.
Canada	22 August 1984	TBS	Cassette; vinyl	TBS4‑501; TBS 501	
