= Chocolate Eclair (film) =

1979 film by Jean-Claude Lord

- French: Éclair au chocolat
- Directed by: Jean-Claude Lord
- Written by: Jean-Claude Lord; Jean Salvy
- Based on: Le voyageur mort by Jean Santacroce
- Produced by: Pierre David
- Starring: Lise Thouin; Jean Belzil-Gascon; Jean-Louis Roux; Colin Fox; Aubert Pallascio
- Cinematography: François Protat
- Edited by: Jean-Claude Lord
- Music by: Richard Grégoire; Diane Juster
- Production companies: Les Productions Mutuelles; Les Productions Vidéofilms
- Release date: 1979
- Running time: 107 minutes
- Country: Canada
- Language: French

Chocolate Eclair (French: Éclair au chocolat) is a Canadian drama film from Quebec, directed by Jean-Claude Lord and released in 1979.

The film centres on Pierre (Jean Belzil-Gascon), a young boy struggling to accept that his single mother Marie-Louise (Lise Thouin) has begun a new relationship after the death of his father. What he does not know is that his mother has lied to protect him: his real father is not dead, but in fact he is the offspring of Marie-Louise having been raped by her father. The film's cast also includes Jean-Louis Roux, Colin Fox, Michèle Deslauriers and Aubert Pallascio.

== Awards ==
The film garnered three Genie Award nominations at the 1st Genie Awards in 1980, in the categories of Best Adapted Screenplay (Lord and Jean Salvy), Best Costume Design (François Barbeau) and Best Sound Editing (Marcel Pothier).

== Plot ==
After she had been raped by her father, a young woman leaves the town with her new born son. Years later, the son can't accept that his mother fell in love with someone else than the mythical father she had told him about.
