= Visiting Hours (film) =

1982 film by Jean-Claude Lord

- Theatrical release poster
- Directed by: Jean-Claude Lord
- Written by: Brian Taggert
- Produced by: Victor Solnicki; Claude Héroux; Pierre David
- Starring: Lee Grant; William Shatner; Michael Ironside; Linda Purl
- Cinematography: René Verzier
- Edited by: Jean-Claude Lord
- Music by: Jonathan Goldsmith
- Production companies: Canadian Film Development Corporation; Filmplan International
- Distributed by: 20th Century Fox (US); Astral Films (Canada)
- Release date: May 28, 1982
- Running time: 105 minutes
- Country: Canada
- Language: English
- Budget: $6 million
- Box office: $13.3 million

Visiting Hours (originally titled The Fright) is a 1982 Canadian psychological slasher film directed by Jean-Claude Lord and starring Lee Grant, Michael Ironside, Linda Purl, William Shatner and Lenore Zann. The plot focuses on Deborah Ballin, a feminist journalist who is attacked in her home by Colt Hawker, a woman-hating serial killer, who then follows her to the hospital to finish her off.

Visiting Hours was released on May 28, 1982, and grossed $13.3 million at the box office on a budget of $6 million.

== Plot ==
Deborah Ballin, a feminist activist, inspires the wrath of the misogynistic psychopath and serial killer Colt Hawker on a TV talk show. He attacks her, but she survives and is sent to County General Hospital.

Colt begins stalking her. Deborah befriends the nurse Sheila Munroe, who admires her devotion to women's rights. Colt murders Mrs. Corrigan, an elderly patient, and Connie Wexler, a nurse. He overhears Sheila's opinions on Deborah and "that bastard" who attacked her. Colt decides to focus his attention on Sheila, stalking her and her children at home.

Colt courts a young girl, Lisa, and then brutally beats and tortures her, despite being unable to rape her. The next day, Deborah discovers that Mrs. Corrigan and Connie have been killed, so she suspects her attacker is back to finish the job. She tries to convince her boss, Gary Baylor, and Sheila that she is not safe, but they both think she is paranoid.

Colt visits his father Dan, who was disfigured years ago when his abused wife Elizabeth fought back and threw hot oil in his face. This event resulted in Colt's hatred of self-defending women. He tries to kill Deborah again but is thwarted by her security. A frantic Sheila is paged and finds Lisa, whose wounds she had treated, waiting for her. Lisa says she knows the identity of Deborah's attacker, and where he lives.

Before she can alert anyone, Sheila receives a phone call from Colt, warning her that he is in her house with her daughter Bridget and babysitter Denise. She sends Lisa to warn Deborah and the police, then rushes home and finds Bridget and Denise safe in bed. She places a call to Deborah, but Colt springs forth to stab Sheila in the stomach and pushes her to the ground. He places the phone to her ear to torture Deborah from hearing her in pain. He moves toward Bridget. Sheila can only scream in terror as he walks out, leaving her to die.

Colt goes home, where he devises one last plan to kill Deborah. He breaks a beer bottle underneath his arm, wounding himself badly. Gary and Deborah have an ambulance sent to Sheila's house. Still alive, but badly wounded, she is rushed to the hospital. Gary accompanies the police to Colt's apartment, where they discover the photos of his previous victims, as well as Deborah and Sheila's. They also learn that the wounded Colt has been taken to County General.

Sheila is taken into the emergency room and Colt is wheeled in. After being bandaged and medicated, he sneaks away to find Deborah and attacks her. She flees to an elevator. In the basement, she goes into a radiography room, finding a helpless Sheila, all alone, waiting for X-rays.

Realizing she must lure Colt away to protect Sheila, Deborah sends the attending nurse for help, then leaves and deliberately gives her location away. Colt approaches the curtain she is hiding behind and Deborah stabs him with a switchblade, killing him. Sheila is wheeled to safety while Gary comforts Deborah.

== Cast ==
- Lee Grant as Deborah Ballin
- Michael Ironside as Colt Hawker
  - Danny Silverman as Young Colt Hawker
- Linda Purl as Sheila Munroe
- William Shatner as Gary Baylor
- Lenore Zann as Lisa
- Harvey Atkin as Vinnie Bradshaw
- Helen Hughes as Louise Sheperd
- Michael J. Reynolds as Porter Halstrom
- Kirsten Bishop as Denise
- Debra Kirshenbaum as Connie Wexler
- Maureen McRae as Elizabeth Hawker
- Dustin Waln as Dan Hawker
- Neil Affleck as Police Officer
- Dora Dainton as Mrs. Corrigan
- Yvan Ducharme as Police Officer
- Tali Fischer as Bridget Munroe
- Robbie Robinson as Matthew
- Lorena Gale as Nurse
- Len Watt as Clement Pine
- Charles Dennis as Doctor

== Production ==
Filming took place in the fall of 1980 in Montreal, Quebec, Canada, under the working title The Fright. The budget was approximately $6 million. Filming completed in late October 1980.

== Release ==
The film was released theatrically in the United States by 20th Century Fox on May 28, 1982.

=== Censorship ===
In the United Kingdom, the film was subject to censorship, and had one minute of footage excised for its theatrical release. It was subsequently classified as a "video nasty" by the British Board of Film Classification (BBFC), though the video print of the film remains the same as the censored theatrical cut.

=== Critical response ===
Reviews from critics were very negative. Vincent Canby of The New York Times called the film "an especially clumsy, overwrought example of slash-and-hack melodrama ... The laughs here are not intentional." Variety wrote that the film, "though artless, is terror-crammed and bloody enough to appeal to the raunchy circuit trade." Gene Siskel of the Chicago Tribune gave it half a star out of four and called it "yet another depressing sickie-with-knife-chasing-women picture." He found it "shocking and depressing" that Lee Grant and William Shatner appeared in it, asking, "Do these people really need a paycheck that badly?"

Many critics commented on the film's portrayal of violence against women: Kevin Thomas of the Los Angeles Times called the film "just another sickening, numbskull movie that hypocritically exploits extreme violence against women while purportedly protesting it." The Austin American-Statesman's Patrick Taggart deemed it "mainly a celebration of violence... there's no warmth here, nor any truly sympathetic characters." Tom Shales of The Washington Post wrote, "You're not just sorry you came to a movie like this; you feel saddened and troubled that it even exists, that somebody saw a few more quick bucks in such a tired, ritualized and malicious formula."

Geoff Brown of The Monthly Film Bulletin called it a "lamentable shocker," with the writer and director "charging like bulls through a script ridden with implausibilities." Bill Cosford of the Miami Herald awarded the film a one-star out of four-star rating, citing plot inconsistencies as a major fault.

Film review aggregator Rotten Tomatoes reports an approval rating of 15%, based on 13 reviews, with an average rating of 3.8/10.

=== Home media ===
The film was released on DVD by Anchor Bay Entertainment in April 2006. It was re-released by Scream Factory, along with Bad Dreams (1988)—another hospital-set horror film—as a double feature DVD on September 13, 2011, with a Blu-ray edition following on February 18, 2014.

== See also ==
- List of films featuring home invasions

== Sources ==
- Barker, Martin (1984). The Video Nasties: Freedom and Censorship In the Media. London, England: Pluto Press. ISBN 978-0-861-04667-6.
- Kerekes, David; Slater, David (2005). See No Evil: Banned Films and Video Controversy. London, England: Headpress. ISBN 978-1-900-48610-1.
- Muir, John Kenneth (2010). Horror Films of the 1980s. Jefferson, North Carolina: McFarland. ISBN 978-0-786-45501-0.
