= The Early Singles =

The Early Singles or Early Singles may refer to:

- The Early Singles (Pink Floyd album), 1992
- The Early Singles (Celine Dion album), 1999
- Early Singles (Rational Youth album), 2000
- Early Singles (Trouble Funk album), 1997
