= Les oiseaux du bonheur =

Compilation album by Celine Dion
- Released: 1984
- Recorded: 1982–1984
- Studio: Family Sound (Paris); Montmartre (Paris)
- Genre: Pop
- Length: 38:43
- Language: French
- Label: Pathé‑Marconi
- Producer: Eddy Marnay; Rudi Pascal

Celine Dion chronology
Les plus grands succès de Céline Dion (1984)	Les oiseaux du bonheur (1984)	C'est pour toi (1985)

Singles from Les oiseaux du bonheur
- 1. "Mon rêve de toujours" Released: September 1984

Les oiseaux du bonheur (lit. 'The birds of happiness') is the second album by Canadian singer Celine Dion released in France. Issued in 1984 through Pathé‑Marconi, the compilation consists mainly of from Dion's earlier Canadian releases, particularly Mélanie (1984). It also includes three new recordings—"Paul et Virginie", "Les oiseaux du bonheur", and "Hymne à l'amitié", the latter being a French adaptation of the Italian song "Amico è".

== Background and conception ==
Les oiseaux du bonheur was Dion's second album prepared specifically for the French market, following Du soleil au cœur (1983). The compilation presents selections from Mélanie and earlier recordings, offering French audiences an overview of her work to that point. Three newly recorded tracks—"Les oiseaux du bonheur", "Paul et Virginie", and "Hymne à l'amitié"—were added to expand the release and introduce material not previously available in France.

== Track listing ==
All tracks were produced by Eddy Marnay and Rudi Pascal.

No.	Title	Writer(s)	Length
1.	"Trois heures vingt"	Marnay; Patrick Lemaître	3:38
2.	"Trop jeune à dix-sept ans"	Marnay; Paul Greedus; Barry Blue	4:54
3.	"Mon rêve de toujours"	Marnay; Jean-Pierre Goussaud	4:20
4.	"Paul et Virginie"	Marnay; Christian Loigerot; Thierry Geoffroy	3:51
5.	"La voix du bon Dieu" (re-record)	Marnay	3:16
6.	"Les oiseaux du bonheur"	Marnay; André Popp	3:42
7.	"Tellement j'ai d'amour pour toi"	Marnay; Hubert Giraud	2:57
8.	"Un amour pour moi"	Marnay; Loigerot; Geoffroy	3:19
9.	"Benjamin"	Marnay; Pierre Papadiamandis	4:38
10.	"Hymne à l'amitié"	Marnay; Dario Baldan Bembo; Nini Giacomelli; Sergio Bardotti	4:08
Total length:			38:43

=== Notes ===
- The re-recorded version of "La voix du bon Dieu" includes updated vocals and a softer orchestral arrangement.

== Release history ==
Release history
Region	Date	Label	Format	Catalog
France	1984	Pathé‑Marconi	Cassette; vinyl	2402194; 2402191
