= Days of Darkness (2007 Canadian film) =

- Theatrical poster
- French: L'Âge des ténèbres
- Directed by: Denys Arcand
- Written by: Denys Arcand
- Produced by: Denise Robert; Daniel Louis; Dominique Besnehard
- Starring: Marc Labrèche; Diane Kruger; Sylvie Léonard; Emma de Caunes; Didier Lucien
- Cinematography: Guy Dufaux
- Edited by: Isabelle Dedieu
- Music by: Philippe Miller
- Distributed by: Alliance Vivafilm (Canada); StudioCanal (France)
- Release dates: May 2007 (Cannes); 7 December 2007
- Running time: 104 minutes
- Countries: Canada; France
- Language: French
- Budget: $6.4 million

Days of Darkness (French: L'Âge des ténèbres), also known as The Age of Ignorance, is a 2007 black comedy-drama film written and directed by Denys Arcand and starring Marc Labrèche, Diane Kruger and Sylvie Léonard. Presented as the third part of Arcand's loose trilogy also consisting of The Decline of the American Empire (1986) and The Barbarian Invasions (2003), it was followed by a fourth film with similar themes, The Fall of the American Empire (2018). The film follows a depressed québecois bureaucrat who, feeling insignificant, retreats into a fantasy world.

The film was screened out of competition at the 2007 Cannes Film Festival. It was nominated for four Genie Awards, including Best Motion Picture, and was shortlisted for the Academy Award for Best Foreign Language Film.

== Plot ==
Jean-Marc Leblanc is a bureaucrat and a once passionate supporter of the Quebec sovereignty movement. His workaholic wife, Sylvie, and media-obsessed teenage daughters are no longer interested in him. At work, he is repeatedly bothered by his superior Carole who berates him for issues such as taking longer breaks than allowed, and for calling black Canadian co-worker William a "Negro", though Jean-Marc insists he simply said William "slaves like a Negro" and William was not personally disturbed by it. Faced with a complete lack of a sex life, he tells his co-workers he is left with masturbation.

Jean-Marc begins to entertain fantasies about women, and about revenge on his co-workers, while sharing how he feels his life turned out to be less than he anticipated. One of his fantasies revolves around a character named Veronica Star, a beautiful celebrity he showers with. Through speed dating, he also meets a female Lord of the Rings enthusiast who takes him to a Middle Ages-themed fair. After this affair fails, his invalid mother dies and he crashes his car. He finally quits his job and abandons his family, retreating to their coastal, peaceful vacation house.

== Cast ==
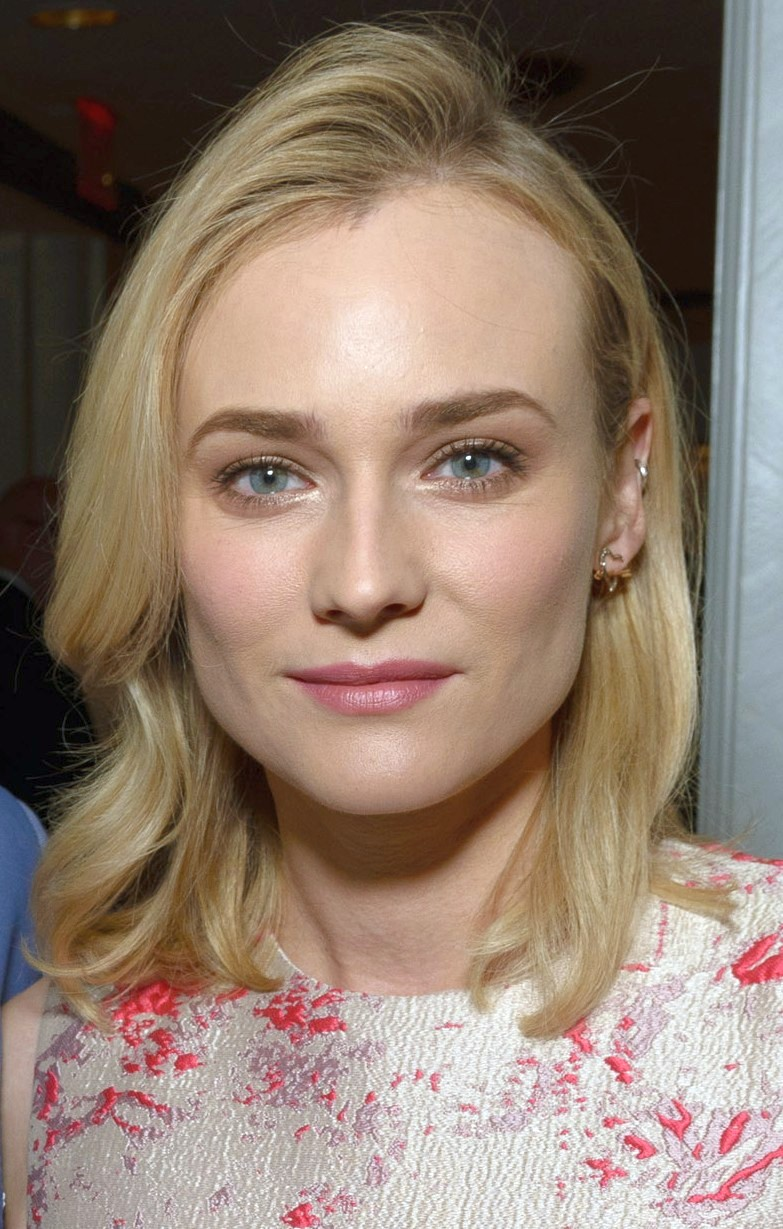
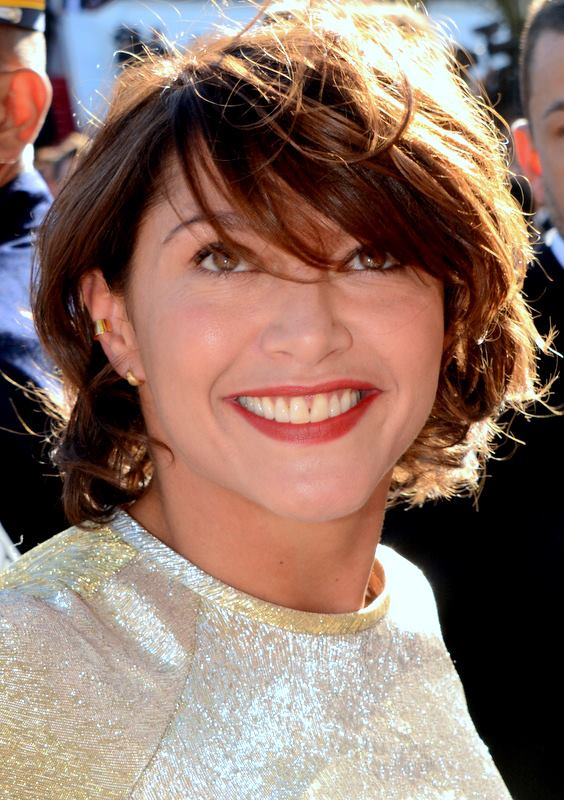
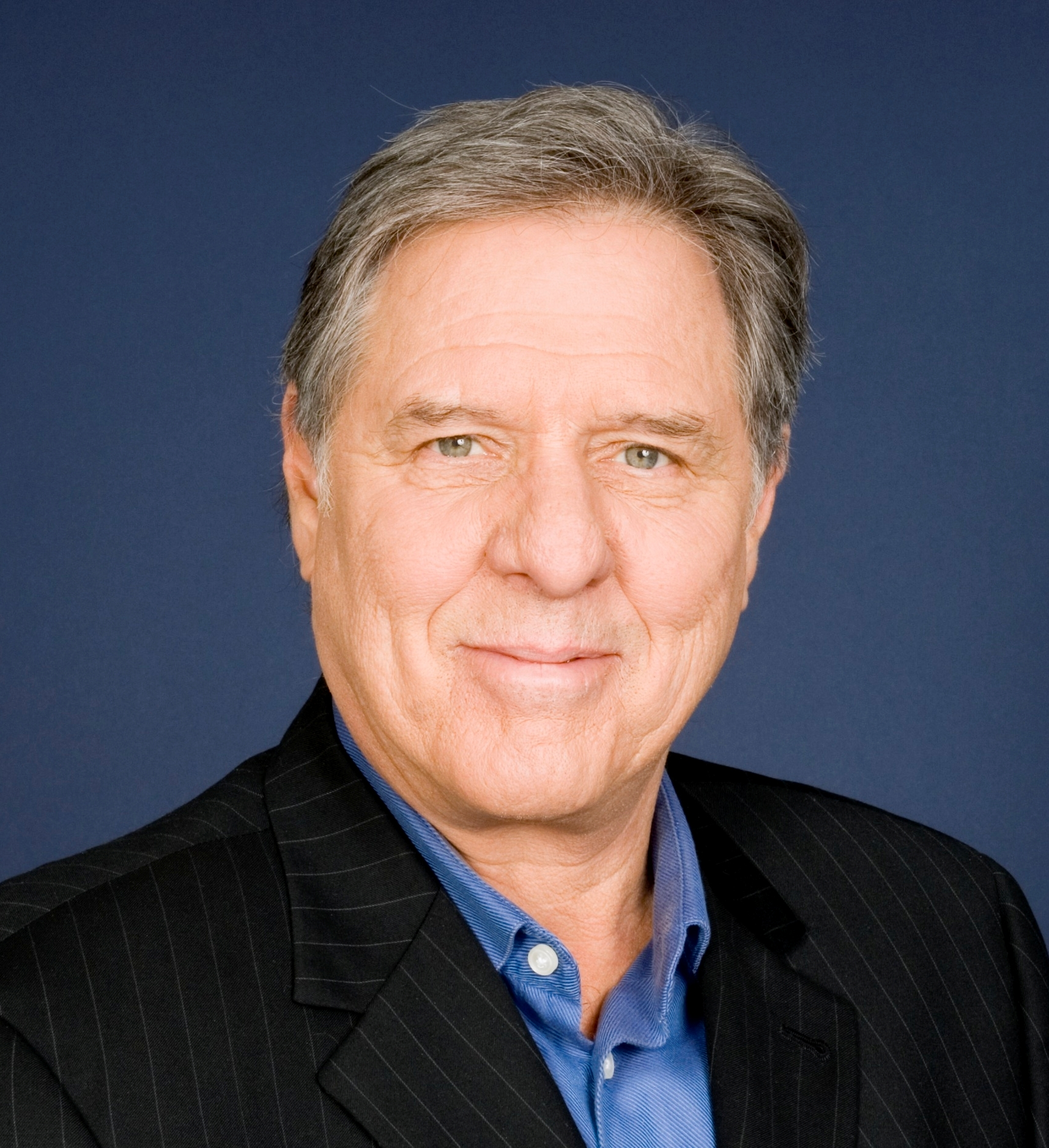
Diane Kruger and Emma de Caunes have starring roles, while Pierre Curzi reprises his role as Pierre from The Barbarian Invasions (2003)
- Marc Labrèche as Jean-Marc Leblanc
- Diane Kruger as Veronica Star
- Sylvie Léonard as Sylvie Cormier-Leblanc
- Caroline Néron as Carole Bigras-Bourque
- Véronique Cloutier as Line
- Rufus Wainwright as le prince charmant chantant (The charming singing prince)
- Macha Grenon as Béatrice de Savoie
- Emma de Caunes as Karine Tendance
- Didier Lucien as William Chérubin
- Rosalie Julien as Laurence Métivier
- Monia Chokri as Aziza
- Jean-René Ouellet as Saint Bernard de Clairvaux
- André Robitaille as le supérieur immédiat (the immediate supervisor)
- Hugo Giroux as Thorvald le Viking
- Christian Bégin as le motivateur hilare
- Pierre Curzi as Pierre
- Gilles Pelletier as Raymond Leclerc
- Johanne-Marie Tremblay as Constance Lazure
- Françoise Graton as Madame Leblanc
- Jacques Lavallée as Romaric
- Michel Rivard as le curé
- Thierry Ardisson as himself
- Laurent Baffie as himself
- Bernard Pivot as himself
- Donald Sutherland as himself

== Production ==
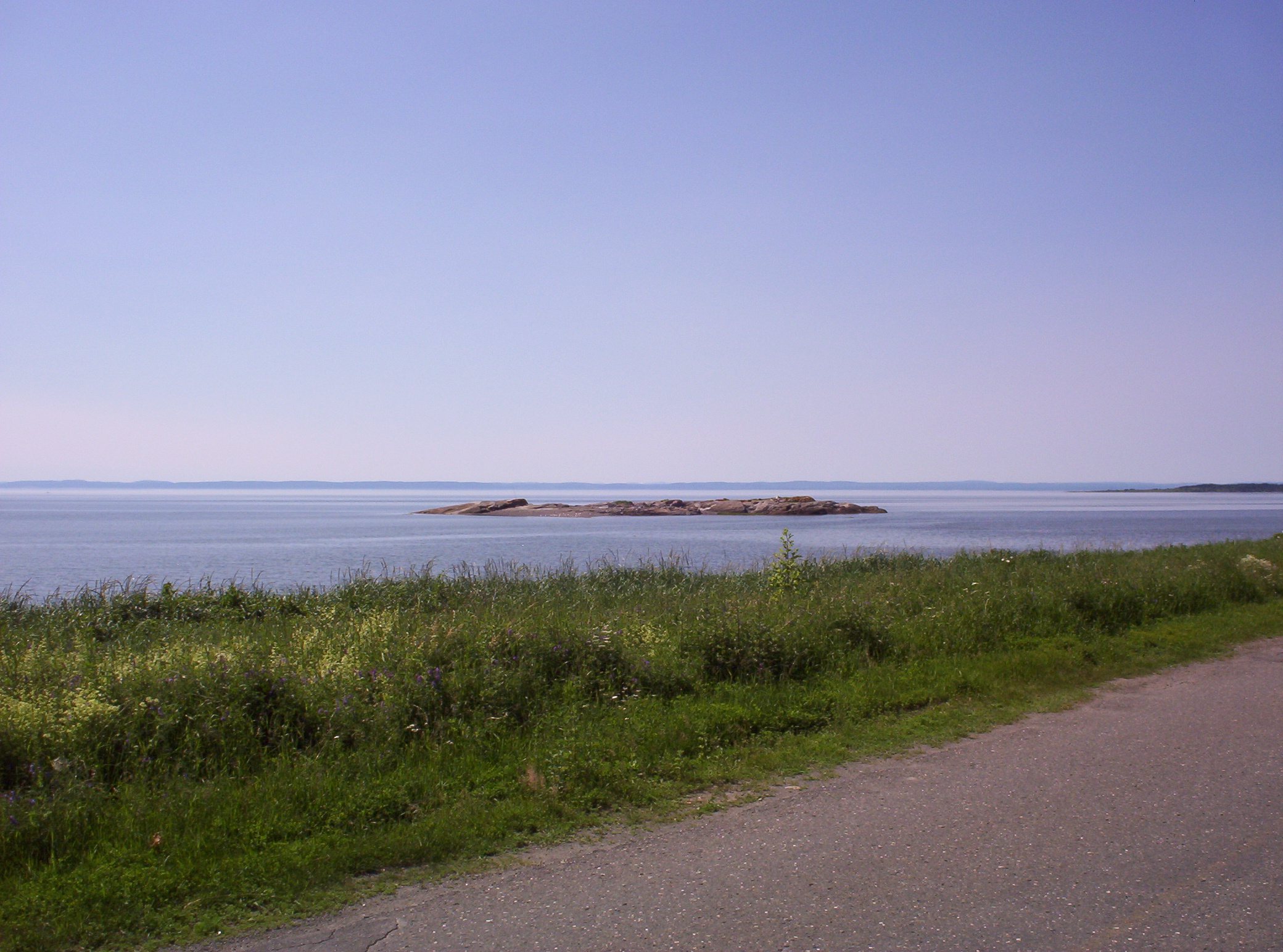
Part of the film was shot on the Saint Lawrence River in Bas-Saint-Laurent.

Director Denys Arcand claimed he wrote parts of the screenplay imagining actor Marc Labrèche as the lead. After six months of work on the screenplay, Arcand met Labrèche and asked him to set aside some months for filming Days of Darkness. The Middle Ages fair scene was inspired by a photograph Arcand saw of hundreds of people wearing historic costumes and holding swords and spears. Arcand wondered why all of these people would want to stage a fictional war, and visited a similar event in Saint-Mathieu-du-Parc, Quebec.

Arcand chose to film in the Montreal Olympic Stadium, citing its high cost to build and maintain. To him, this represented "a society that’s falling down". Another filming location is the Saint Lawrence River in Bas-Saint-Laurent, seen in the sequence with actress Johanne-Marie Tremblay, reprising her role as Constance from Jesus of Montreal (1989) and The Barbarian Invasions.

Special effects were added to the film by Hybride, based in Montreal, while sound mixing was carried out in Paris, and both processes met with delays. Arcand told his wife, producer Denise Robert, not to rush post-production, saying "This is a movie, not a race".

== Release ==
The film was screened out of competition at the Cannes Film Festival in May 2007. The film also screened in the Toronto International Film Festival in September 2007. While considered part of a loose trilogy following The Decline of the American Empire and The Barbarian Invasions, Arcand acknowledged in a 2007 interview Days of Darkness had more similarities to his less successful 2000 film Stardom. In 2018, Arcand's The Fall of the American Empire followed similar themes as Decline and The Barbarian Invasions.

Plans to release the film in Quebec in May were delayed due to incomplete special effects and sound mixing, causing the release date to be re-set for 7 December. By 27 December, it grossed $852,547 in Quebec. L'Âge des ténèbres was released in English under the titles Days of Darkness and The Age of Ignorance. The film was released on DVD in Quebec on 30 June 2008, showing the provincial and international versions of the film differed by five minutes.

== Reception ==
=== Critical reception ===
Days of Darkness has an approval rating of 20% on review aggregator website Rotten Tomatoes, based on 5 reviews, and an average rating of 5.5/10.

In Canada, Peter Howell praised the film in The Toronto Star as "exceptional", simultaneously "depressing" and "uplifting", and better than some of the films that did contend for the Palme d'Or in 2007. On Canoe.ca, Antoine Godin wrote the film structure felt less complete than The Barbarian Invasions and lacked its power. Marc-André Lussier, writing for La Presse, said parts of the film were embarrassing and the Medieval fair scenes dragged, but the realistic scenes were great. Manon Dumais of Voir judged it one of Arcand's lesser films, saying the Middle Ages fair sequence is tedious. Yann Buxeda wrote in Toronto's L'Express that the film was not a masterpiece, but Marc Labrèche helped it. Sun Media's Bruce Kirkland dismissed the film as occasionally charming, but unsubtle, uneven and unable to meet expectations.

Kirk Honeycutt, writing for The Hollywood Reporter in response to the Cannes screening, called the film the most amusing of Arcand's "impressive trilogy", and a satire of "flaws and foibles of this dark age". Variety's Derek Elley described the film as "ho-hum", finding fault in a repetitive screenplay. The film received negative reviews in France, with Les Inrockuptibles describing it as "a film from an old fool", and Le Nouvel Observateur declaring it "Le Déclin de l’empire Arcand".

=== Accolades ===
Canada submitted the film for consideration for the Academy Award for Best Foreign Language Film. In January 2008, Academy members shortlisted the film among nine for the 80th Academy Awards, but it was not nominated.

Award	Date of ceremony	Category	Recipient(s)	Result	Ref(s)
Genie Awards	3 March 2008	Best Motion Picture	Denise Robert and Daniel Louis	Nominated	
Genie Awards	3 March 2008	Best Direction	Denys Arcand	Nominated	
Genie Awards	3 March 2008	Best Original Screenplay	Denys Arcand	Nominated	
Genie Awards	3 March 2008	Best Actor	Marc Labrèche	Nominated	
Jutra Awards	6 February 2008	Best Film	Denise Robert and Daniel Louis	Nominated	
Jutra Awards	6 February 2008	Best Direction	Denys Arcand	Nominated	
Jutra Awards	6 February 2008	Best Screenplay	Denys Arcand	Nominated	
Jutra Awards	6 February 2008	Best Actor	Marc Labrèche	Nominated	
Jutra Awards	6 February 2008	Best Actress	Sylvie Léonard	Nominated	
Jutra Awards	6 February 2008	Best Make-up	Diane Simard	Won	
Lumière Awards	13 January 2008	Best French-Language Film	Denys Arcand	Nominated	

== See also ==
- List of submissions to the 80th Academy Awards for Best Foreign Language Film
- List of Canadian submissions for the Academy Award for Best Foreign Language Film
