= The Doves (film) =

1972 Canadian film

- French: Les Colombes
- Directed by: Jean-Claude Lord
- Written by: Jean-Claude Lord
- Produced by: Pierre Patry; Pierre David; Jean-Claude Lord
- Starring: Jean Besré; Lise Thouin; Jean Duceppe
- Cinematography: Claude La Rue
- Edited by: Jean-Claude Lord
- Music by: Michel Conte
- Production company: Les Productions Mutuels
- Release date: September 15, 1972
- Running time: 116 minutes
- Country: Canada
- Language: French

The Doves (French: Les Colombes) is a Canadian drama film, directed by Jean-Claude Lord and released in 1972. The film stars Jean Besré as Julien Ferland, a wealthy young university professor who marries Josianne Boucher (Lise Thouin), an aspiring singer from a more working-class background, against the disapproval of their families.

The cast also includes Jean Duceppe, Manda Parent, Paul Berval, Jean Coutu and Diane Guérin, as well as singers Françoise Hardy and Willie Lamothe in small supporting roles.

The film was entered into competition at the 24th Canadian Film Awards.
