= Terre humaine =

- Genre: Drama
- Country of origin: Canada
- Original language: French
- No. of episodes: 229

Original release
- Network: Radio Canada
- Release: September 18, 1978 – June 4, 1984

Terre humaine (Human Earth) is a French-Canadian soap opera TV series written by Mia Riddez which originally aired on Radio-Canada from September 18, 1978 to June 4, 1984, totalling 229 episodes.

== Plot ==
The show takes place in rural Quebec and explores the lives of the Jacquemins, a family of farmers. At the center of it is Léandre "Pépère" Jaquemin, the elder of the family, his son Antoine and his spouse Jeanne, who are witnesses to the difficulties their children and their friends face, all of which builds scenes for a good novel.

== Cast ==
- Guy Provost as Antoine Jacquemin
- Marjolaine Hébert as Jeanne Jacquemin
- Jean Duceppe as Léandre Jacquemin
- Raymond Legault as Jean-François Jacquemin
- Sylvie Léonard as Annick Jacquemin
- Jean-Jacques Desjardins as Martin Jacquemin
- Dorothée Berryman as Berthe Jacquemin-Dantin
- Denyse Chartier as Élisabeth Demaison
- Alain Gélinas as Michel Jacquemin
- Serge Turgeon as Laurent Dantin
- Louis De Santis as Jonas Jacquemin
- Jacqueline Plouffe as Eléonore Jacquemin
- Aubert Pallascio as Frédéric Jacquemin
- Élisabeth Chouvalidzé as Josée Dubreuil
- Reine France as Marthe Parrot
- Edgar Fruitier as Hector Bastarache
- Françoise Graton as Stéphanie Dubreuil
- Sita Riddez as Simone Dubreuil
- Yves Massicotte as Ovila Demaison
- Janine Fluet as Orise Demaison
- Denis Mercier as Hugues Lacroix
- Suzanne Léveillé as Mireille Dutilly
- Madeleine Sicotte as Carmelle Dutilly
- Marthe Choquette as Pauline Landry
- Diane Charbonneau as Corinne Prieur
- Mimi D'Estée as Marguerite Lacoursière
- Alain Charbonneau as Joseph Jacquemin
- Danielle Schneider as Jocelyne Jacquemin
- Mitsou as Annouk Jacquemin
- Suzanne Marier as Pierrette Jacquemin
- Julien Bessette as Réal Jacquemin
- Yvan Benoît as Robin Laroche
- Yves Allaire as Rolland
- Yolande Binet as Alice Landry
- Denis Bouchard as Pit
- Paul E. Boutet as Paul Boutet
- Rachel Cailhier as Gervaise Cadieux
- René Caron as Jacques Quirion
- Francine Caron-Panaccio as Lise de Carufel
- Marie-Josée Caya as Julie Coallier
- Jean-Raymond Châles as Gilles Coallier
- Jacinthe Chaussé as Madeleine Sanderson
- Liliane Clune as Lucie Goyette
- Gilbert Comtois as Paulo Lacasse
- Rolland D'Amour as Hilaire Jacquemin
- Larry Michel Demers as Rod Bélisle
- Jean-Luc Denis as Bercy
- Jean Deschênes as Éric Belval
- Yves Desgagnés as Raymond Gaudette
- Robert Desroches as Louis de Carufel
- Claude Desrosiers as Philippe Demaison
- Paul Dion as Gérald Morency
- Anne-Marie Ducharme as Gisèle Gervais
- Yvan Ducharme as Jean-Guy Roy
- Lisette Dufour as Lina Jacquemin
- Ghyslain Filion as Daniel Bertrand
- Jacques Fortier as Georges
- Louiselle Fortier as Jocelyne
- Ronald France as Dr. Turgeon
- Sébastien Frappier as François Jacquemin
- J. Léo Gagnon as René Parrot
- Pat Gagnon as Maurice Gélinas
- Benjamin Gauthier as Jean-François Jacquemin
- Marcel Gauthier as Marcel Dutilly
- Annette Garant as Nathalie
- Paul Gauthier as Yves Larin
- Gérald Gilbert as Patrick Gignac
- Luc Gingras as Raymond Bellemare
- Marcel Girard as Dr. Lemay
- Renée Girard as Thérèse Parrot
- Sylvie Gosselin as Lysiane Bastarache
- Blaise Gouin as Adélard Rancourt
- Claude Grisé as Dr. Marois
- Roger Guertin as Bertrand Rioux
- Roseline Hoffman as Béatrice Giria
- Laurent Imbault as Philippe
- Ian Ireland as Thomas Sanderson
- Roland Jetté as Gervais
- Olivier Landry as the son of Anne Biron
- Serge Lasalle as Hermas Dehoux
- Jean-Guy Latour as Marcelin Ménard
- Marc Legault as Roger Bertrand
- Yvon Leroux as Arthur Chrétien
- Jean-François Lesage as Rolland Longtin
- Jean-Pierre Légaré as Henri
- Michelle Léger as Anne Biron
- Jacques L'Heureux as Pierre Jolivet
- Angélique Martel as Agnès Sanderson
- Walter Massey as Dr. O'Neil
- Jean-Pierre Masson as André "Ti-Dré" Fafard
- Louise Matteau as Ève-Marie Roy
- René Migliaccio as Guy Guimond
- Denise Morelle as Gertrude Jacquemin
- Rock Ménard : as Mr. Lalancette
- Gilles Normand as Sergeant Beaurivage
- Lucille Papineau as Anne-Marie Chrétien
- Gérard Paradis as Réjean Dubreuil
- Jean-Louis Paris as Curé Maillet
- Chantal Perrier as Catherine
- Louise Portal as Isabelle Dantin
- Gilles Quenneville as Olivier
- Claude Ravenel as Adrien Dupras
- José Rettino as Vidal Thérien
- Jean Ricard as Sergeant Durivage
- Annick Robitaille as Hélène Dantin
- Carole Chatel as Anita Lopez
- Stéphanie Robitaille as Nathalie Dantin
- Anne-Marie Rocher as Véronique Roy
- Dominique Roy as Madeleine L'Heureux
- Diane St-Onge as Éléonore Jacquemin (young)
- Jacques Tourangeau as Jacques Riopel
- Johanne Tremblay as Annette
- Béatrix Van Til as Marie-Mélie Chrétien
- Robert Toupin as Jean-Louis Laverdière
- Richard Thériault as Marc Biron
- Michel Bergeron as Marc Préville
- Sylvain Dupuis as Kevin Jacquemin
- Joannie Lalancette as Bénédicte Jacquemin
- Guillaume Richard as Sylvain Demaison
- Sébastien Richard as Raphaël Demaison
- Sylvie Beauregard as Sophie Dutilly
- Olivier Vadnais as Marc-Antoine Biron
- Roland Chenail as Dr. René Boudrias
- Andrée Champagne as Éliane Boudrias
- Gwladys Breault Joseph as Gwladys
- Marc Picard as Policeman
- Pierre Gobeil as Marcel Cantin
- Pascal Rollin as Régis de Vercor
- Monique Joly as Suzanne Riopel
- Robert Bouchard as Farmer
- Claude Desjardins as Constant Soucy
- Yvan Canuel as Laurent Dantin's trustee
- Jean-Guy Bouchard as Policeman
