= Louis Pelletier =

American writer

Louis Pelletier (March 7, 1906 – February 11, 2000) was an American writer of radio dramas and screenplays for motion pictures and television.

Pelletier was born in New York City, New York. He graduated from Dartmouth College. He co-wrote the 1937 Broadway play Howdy Stranger that Warner Bros. made into a 1938 film, Cowboy from Brooklyn. His career was interrupted by service with the United States Army during World War II. In late 1944 he became one of several writers who wrote radio plays called The FBI in Peace and War based on the 1943 book of the same title by Frederick Lewis Collins; the highly successful series ran until 1958. He was the co-creator and a writer for the 1954–1955 situation comedy Willy In the late 1950s and early 1960s, Pelletier became one of the first screenwriters for television drama, penning scripts for Kraft Television Theater, General Electric Theater and The Untouchables.

In 1962, Walt Disney Pictures hired Pelletier to adapt books to the screen that Disney had under option. Over the next decade he wrote six screenplays including Big Red, which was adapted from the Jim Kjelgaard novel, Follow Me, Boys!, which was adapted from the MacKinlay Kantor novel, and Bayou Boy. He wrote his last film script for Disney in 1972.

Pelletier taught screenplay writing at the University of Southern California.

Pelletier died at the age of 93 in Santa Monica, California.
