= Let's Talk About Love (film) =

1976 Canadian film

- French: Parlez-nous d'amour
- Directed by: Jean-Claude Lord
- Written by: Jean-Claude Lord; Michel Tremblay
- Produced by: Pierre David
- Starring: Jacques Boulanger
- Cinematography: François Brault
- Edited by: Jean-Claude Lord; Lise Thouin
- Production company: Les Productions Mutuels
- Release date: September 24, 1976
- Running time: 127 minutes
- Country: Canada
- Language: French

Let's Talk About Love (French: Parlez-nous d'amour) is a Canadian comedy-drama film, directed by Jean-Claude Lord and released in 1976. A satire of television production, the film stars Jacques Boulanger as Jeannot, a television variety show host who becomes disillusioned with the television industry, and begins to reveal the behind-the-scenes behaviour of his colleagues on the air, including allegations of sexual exploitation, bribery, payola and attempts to bury celebrity scandals before they get reported.

The film featured a large ensemble cast, including Benoît Girard, Claude Michaud, Anne Létourneau, Nicole Cloutier, Véronique Béliveau, Rita Lafontaine, Françoise Berd, Amulette Garneau, Monique Mercure, Manda Parent, Pierre Curzi, Jacques DesBaillets, Jacques Famery, Muriel Dutil, Diane Guérin, Yvon Barrette, Michelle Rossignol, Gabriel Arcand, Yvette Thuot and Guy L'Écuyer

The film was inspired in part by Boulanger, himself a Quebec television variety host of the era, and his own disgust with the private behaviour of some of his colleagues. The screenplay was written by Michel Tremblay, based in part on real tape recordings Boulanger had provided from his show. It was highly controversial in its era, but later attracted a significant cult following.
