= La voix du bon Dieu =

Studio album by Celine Dion
- Released: 6 November 1981
- Recorded: 1981
- Studios: Marylin (Boucherville); St-Charles (Longueuil)
- Genre: Pop
- Length: 28:55
- Language: French
- Label: Super Étoiles
- Producers: René Angélil; Daniel Hétu; Eddy Marnay

Celine Dion chronology
La voix du bon Dieu (1981)	Céline Dion chante Noël (1981)

Singles from La voix du bon Dieu
- 1. "Ce n'était qu'un rêve" Released: 11 June 1981; 2. "La voix du bon Dieu" Released: November 1981; 3. "L'amour viendra" Released: February 1982

La voix du bon Dieu (lit. 'Good Lord's voice') is the debut studio album by Canadian singer Celine Dion, released in Quebec, Canada, on 6 November 1981 through Super Étoiles and distributed by Trans-Canada Disques. Produced by René Angélil, Eddy Marnay, and Daniel Hétu, it contains original songs and covers of classic French chansons. The album includes Dion's debut single, "Ce n'était qu'un rêve", which reached number eight on the Quebec chart.

== Background and conception ==
At age 12, Dion co-wrote her first song, "Ce n'était qu'un rêve", with her mother and brother Jacques. A demo recording was sent to music manager René Angélil, who was impressed by Dion's vocal maturity and emotional delivery. Determined to launch her career, Angélil mortgaged his home to finance the production of her first album. La voix du bon Dieu includes original material written for Dion, along with three covers of well-known French songs: Renée Lebas's "Tire l'aiguille", Berthe Sylva's "Les roses blanches", and "L'amour viendra", a French adaptation of Dario Baldan Bembo's "Dolce fiore". Recording sessions took place in Boucherville and Longueuil, both located in the province of Quebec, Canada, where Dion worked closely with Eddy Marnay, one of France's most respected lyricists.

== Commercial performance ==
Supported by Dion's debut single "Ce n'était qu'un rêve", the album sold over 100,000 copies in Quebec. Its popularity led to a 1983 reissue by Saisons.

== Accolades ==
In 1982, Dion received a nomination for Newcomer of the Year at the Félix Awards.

== Track listing ==
No.	Title	Writer(s)	Producer(s)	Length
1.	"La voix du bon Dieu"	Eddy Marnay	Marnay; René Angélil	3:16
2.	"Au secours"	Robert Leroux; Pierre Létourneau	Angélil	3:27
3.	"L'amour viendra"	Marnay; Amerigo Paolo Cassella; Dario Baldan Bembo	Marnay; Angélil	4:20
4.	"Autour de moi"	Thérèse Dion; Pierre Alexandre Tremblay	Angélil	2:58
5.	"Grand-maman"	T. Dion; Celine Dion; Jacques Dion	Angélil	3:39
6.	"Ce n'était qu'un rêve"	T. Dion; C. Dion; J. Dion	Daniel Hétu; Angélil	3:47
7.	"Seul un oiseau blanc"	Marnay; Hétu	Marnay; Hétu	4:12
8.	"Tire l'aiguille"	Marnay; Emil Stern; Eddie Barclay	Angélil	2:21
9.	"Les roses blanches"	Charles-Louis Pothier; Léon Raiter	Angélil	5:55
Total length:				28:55

== Notes ==
- "L'amour viendra" is a French adaptation of the 1981 song "Dolce fiore" by Italian singer Dario Baldan Bembo.
- "Tire l'aiguille" is a cover of the 1952 song "Tire, tire l'aiguille (laï, laï, laï)" by French singer Renée Lebas.
- "Les roses blanches" is a cover of the 1926 song by French singer Berthe Sylva.

== Release history ==
Release history
Region	Date	Label	Format	Catalog	Ref.
Canada	6 November 1981	Super Étoiles	Cassette; vinyl	SPE4-4101; SPE 4101	
Canada	1983	Saisons	Cassette; vinyl	SNS4-70000; SNS 70000	
