= Duplessis (TV series) =

- Written by: Denys Arcand
- Directed by: Mark Blandford
- Starring: Jean Lapointe; Gabriel Arcand
- Original language: French
- No. of episodes: 7

Production
- Running time: 420 minutes

Original release
- Release: February 7 – March 21, 1978

Duplessis was a historical television series in Quebec, Canada, that aired in 1978. It tells the story of Maurice Duplessis, the controversial premier of Quebec from 1936 to 1939 and 1944 to 1959. It is one of the most famous mini-series in Quebec television history. The series was written (but not directed) by Oscar-winning film director Denys Arcand, and based in large part on Conrad Black's popular biography. The series contains 7 episodes, each one containing a different historic moment in Duplessis's life and path into power. Duplessis is portrayed by Jean Lapointe. It is distributed by Radio-Canada and is available on DVD.

== Cast ==
- Jean Lapointe – Maurice Duplessis
- Gabriel Arcand – Ti-Bi Chamberland
- Rolland Bédard – Maurice Thinel
- Roger Blay – Adélard Godbout
- Yvon Bouchard – Maurice Hamelin
- Jean Brousseau – Paul Gouin
- Yvan Canuel – Mgr Georges Cabana
- René Caron – Onésime Gagnon
- Raymond Cloutier – Daniel Johnson
- Gilbert Comptois – J.A. Côté
- Pierre Curzi – Le reporter
- Robert Desroches – S. Dufresne
- Denis Drouin – E. Tétreault
- Patricia Nolin – Auréa Cloutier
- Jacques Tourangeau – Oscar Drouin
- Marcel Sabourin – Joseph-Damase Bégin

== See also ==
- List of Quebec television series
- Television of Quebec
- Culture of Quebec
- Politics of Quebec
- History of Quebec
