= Jean Coutu (actor) =

Canadian actor

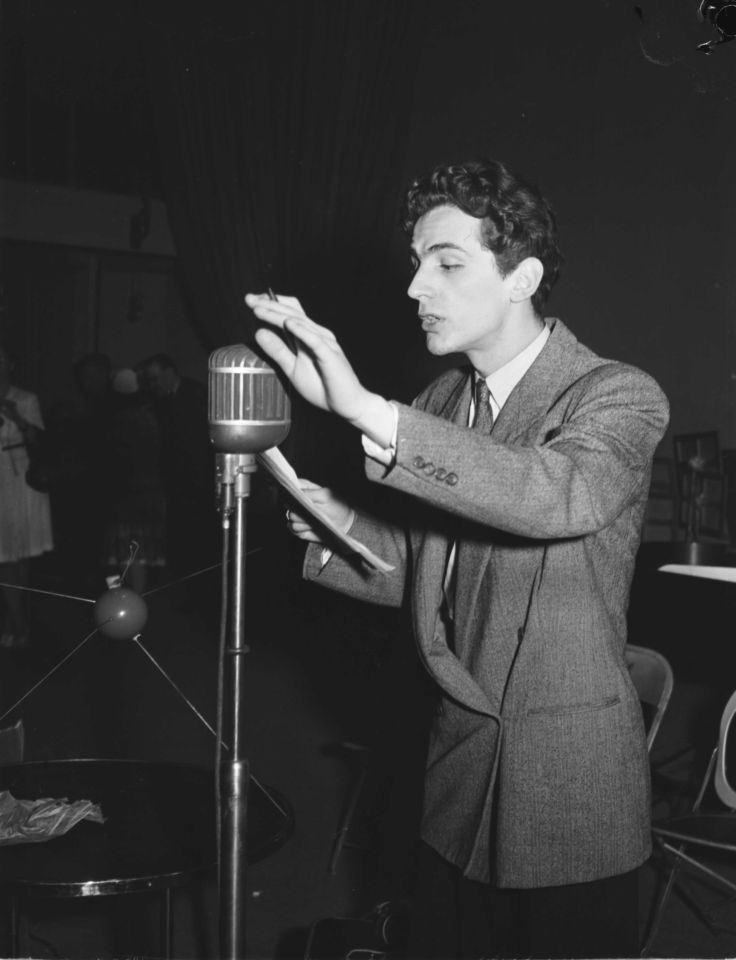
- Jean Coutu
- Born: March 31, 1925; Montreal
- Died: November 1, 1999 (aged 74)
- Occupation: actor
- Years active: 1952-1987
- Known for: movies and TV series in Quebec
- Notable work: episodes of La famille Plouffe in 1953

Jean Coutu (March 31, 1925 – November 1, 1999) was a Canadian actor. Born in Montreal, his career included many movies and TV series in Quebec, including episodes of La famille Plouffe in 1953. He also played in a Disney production Nikki, Wild Dog of the North, becoming one of the few Quebecers of his era to have appeared in Hollywood productions.

After his death in 1999, he was entombed at the Notre Dame des Neiges Cemetery in Montreal.

His daughter, Angèle Coutu, is also an actress.

== Filmography ==
Year	Title	Role	Notes
1952	The Nightingale and the Bells (Le rossignol et les cloches)	René	
1961	Nikki, Wild Dog of the North	Andre Dupas	
1971	Heads or Tails (Pile ou face)	Gunther	
1971	7 fois... par jour	Adam Lafontaine	
1972	The Apparition (L'Apparition)	Timé	
1972	And Hope to Die	Inspector	
1972	The Doves (Les colombes)	M. Ferland	
1972	The Rebels (Quelques arpents de neige)		
1973	And I Love You Dearly (La maîtresse)	Jacques Langlois	
1977	Panic (Panique)	Raymond St-Jacques	
1987	Brother André	Père Dion	
