= Noël Blank =

2003 film by Jean-François Rivard

- Directed by: Jean-François Rivard
- Written by: Jean-François Rivard
- Produced by: Christine Ciupka
- Starring: Gilles Pelletier; Sylvain Marcel; Pascale Desrochers; Patrice Dussault
- Cinematography: Jean-Pierre Trudel
- Edited by: Vicky Daneau
- Music by: Jean-François Rivard
- Production company: Locomotion Films
- Release date: 2003
- Running time: 24 minutes
- Country: Canada
- Language: French

Noël Blank is a Canadian short film, directed by Jean-François Rivard and released in 2003. The film stars Gilles Pelletier as Eddy, a man with Alzheimer's disease who temporarily leaves his nursing home to experience what is likely to be his last family Christmas. The cast also includes Sylvain Marcel, Pascale Desrochers and Patrice Dussault.

The film's title is a play on words, blending "Noël blanc", the French-language translation of the phrase "White Christmas", with the English-language word "blank".

The film won the Genie Award for Best Live Action Short Drama at the 24th Genie Awards.
