= Lise Thouin =

French Canadian actress and writer (born 1950)

Lise Thouin (10 July 1950) is a French Canadian actress and writer. She was married to the director Jean-Claude Lord until his death in January 2022.

== Filmography ==
- 1972 : The Doves (Les Colombes) - Josianne Boucher
- 1974 : Bingo - collaboration on scenario with her husband, and release as singer of single "Bingo" written by Michel Conte
- 1976 : Let's Talk About Love (Parlez-nous d'amour) - script
- 1976 : Grand-Papa TV - Mme Lacoste
- 1977 : Panic (Panique) - Hélène
- 1979 : Chocolate Eclair (Éclair au chocolat) - Marie-Louise
- 1986 : Lance et compte TV - Nicole Gagnon
- 1987 : La Grenouille et la baleine - Anne (and screenwriting)
- 1992 : L'Amour avec un Grand A, TV episode L'Amour, c'est pas assez
- 1993 : Les Grands procès, TV episode Ginette Couture-Marchand - Dr. Légaré
- 2010 : Fatal
