= Gilles Pelletier =

Canadian actor

Gilles Pelletier, OC (March 22, 1925 – September 5, 2018) was a Canadian actor.

== Career ==
Pelletier appeared in over 50 film and television productions between 1951 and 2016. He is perhaps best known for his portrayal of Corporal Jacques Gagnier in the police drama R.C.M.P. Among his film credits are Alfred Hitchcock's I Confess (1953), Dust from Underground (1968) the Denys Arcand films Jesus of Montreal (1989) and The Barbarian Invasions (2003)

In 1964, he founded the Nouvelle Compagnie théâtrale, a live theatre for youths, and served as director for fifteen years.

== Personal life and honours ==
Pelletier was born in Quebec on March 22, 1925, and he died in Montreal, Quebec on September 6, 2018. He was married to Francoise Graton until her death in 2014.

Pelletier was awarded the Order of Canada on July 11, 1988, and was invested on December 31, 2024.

He is the brother of Denise Pelletier, a stage actress, whose name was given to the Prix Denise-Pelletier for achievements of French Canadians, which was awarded to Gilles in 1998 for his lifetime career in the theatre.

== Filmography ==
| Year | Title | Role | Notes |
|---|---|---|---|
| 1951 | The 13th Letter | Townsman | Uncredited |
| 1953 | I Confess | Father Benoit | Uncredited |
| 1964 | The Earth to Drink (La terre à boire) | Michel (le père de Barbara) | |
| 1968 | Dust from Underground (Poussière sur la ville) | Le curé | |
| 1974 | Bingo | Pierre | |
| 1975 | The Vultures (Les vautours) | le docteur Loiselle | |
| 1982 | Gapi | Gapi | |
| 1986 | The Great Land of Small | Grandpa | |
| 1989 | Looking for Eternity (Portion d'éternité) | Monsieur Lemieux | |
| 1989 | Jesus of Montreal (Jésus de Montréal) | Fr. Leclerc | |
| 1991 | Nelligan | M. Fréchette | |
| 1996 | Coyote Run | Bobjoy | |
| 1998 | You Can Thank Me Later | Priest | |
| 2003 | The Barbarian Invasions (Les Invasions barbares) | Priest Raymond Leclerc | |
| 2003 | Seducing Doctor Lewis (La Grande séduction) | Alphonse Pinsonneault | |
| 2003 | Noël Blank | Eddy | Short |
| 2004 | Daniel and the Superdogs | Grandpa | |
| 2004 | Pinocchio 3000 | Gepetto | Canadian French version, Voice |
| 2007 | Days of Darkness (L'Âge des ténèbres) | Au bord du fleuve | |
| 2009 | Romaine par moins 30 | Grand-papa | |
| 2015 | Where Atilla Passes (Là où Atilla passe...) | Grandpa Raymond | |
| 2015 | On My Mother's Side (L'Origine des espèces) | Fernand | (final film role) |
