= Émile Genest =

Canadian actor (1921–2003)

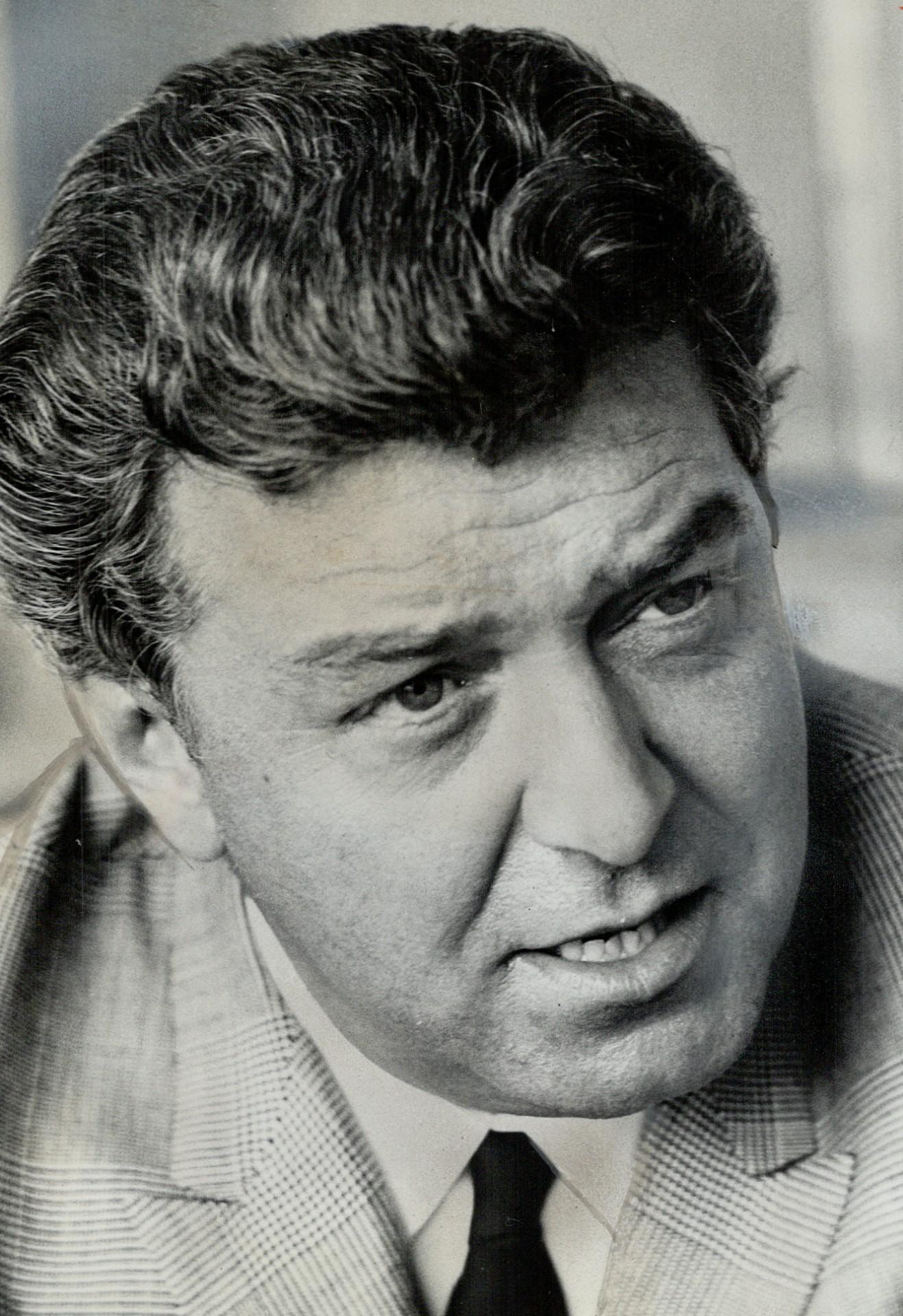
- Born: July 27, 1921; Quebec City, Quebec, Canada
- Died: March 19, 2003 (aged 81); Hallandale, Florida, U.S.

Émile Genest (July 27, 1921 – March 19, 2003) was a Canadian actor.

== Career ==
Born in Quebec City, Quebec, as a young man Genest served with the Royal Canadian Navy during World War II. At war's end, he worked for a time in radio in his hometown before accepting a job with CBC radio in Montreal where he would eventually become a sportscaster, working in both French and English.

Genest turned to acting and in his early years played a son on the immensely popular French-language radio show, La famille Plouffe and on its follow-up television series. In 1961 he had a significant role in the first of several films for Walt Disney Pictures. The first was Nikki, Wild Dog of the North followed by 1962's Big Red and the following year he was cast in the lead of The Incredible Journey. Moving to Hollywood, Émile Genest went on to play character roles in a variety of films including The Cincinnati Kid (1965), The King's Pirate (1967), In Enemy Country (1968), The Hell with Heroes (1968), and Don't Just Stand There! (1968). His son, Claude, was born in 1963 in Hollywood and also worked as an actor before becoming an ecological activist.

In the early 1960s, Genest turned to performing on television, appearing in a large number of guest roles in a variety of series such as Mission: Impossible, Route 66, Gunsmoke, Combat!, The Rat Patrol, Perry Mason, The Virginian, Ironside and others. Near the end of the 1970s, Genest returned to work in film in Canada. In 1981, he was cast as the head of the family in a four-hour film update of "The Plouffe Family" for which he was nominated for a Genie Award for Best Performance by an Actor in a Supporting Role.

In 2000, at the age of seventy-nine, Émile Genest appeared in his last film, "A Day in a Life" (2000). He died of a heart attack while vacationing in Hallandale Beach, Florida in 2003.

His elder son is Green Party of Canada unelected politician Claude Genest. His second son, Eric Genest, is the Vice President of Group Alta Real Estate, Inc..

== Partial filmography ==
- Nikki, Wild Dog of the North (1961) - Jacques Lebeau
- Dubois et fils (1961)
- Alfred Hitchcock Presents (1962) (Season 7 Episode 29: "The Matched Pearl") - Laurent DuBois
- Big Red (1962) - Emile Fornet
- Combat! (1962) (TV Series) (Season 1 Episode 4: "Any Second Now") - Emile, the barman
- Combat! (1963) (TV Series) (Season 1 Episode 13: "Reunion") - Henri Fouquet
- Rampage (1963) - Schelling
- The Incredible Journey (1963) - John Longridge
- Gunsmoke (1963) (Season 8 Episode 37: "Jeb") - Chouteau
- Gunsmoke (1964) (Season 9 Episode 34: "Homecoming") - Frisbie
- Rawhide (1964) (Season 7 Episode 1: "The Race") - Curt Mathison
- The Virginian (1964) (Season 2 Episode 16: "Roar from the Mountain") - Louis Dubois
- The Man from U.N.C.L.E. (1964) (Season 1 Episode 12: "The Dove Affair") - Arseny Linz
- Perry Mason (1964) (Season 7, Episode 20, "The Case of the Frightened Fisherman") - Hans Lang
- Combat! (1965) (TV Series) (Season 3 Episode 26: "The Tree of Moray") - Duval
- The Art of Love (1965) - Cesar (uncredited)
- The Cincinnati Kid (1965) - Cajun
- The Virginian (1966) (Season 4 Episode 22: "Harvest of Strangers") - Brule
- The Rat Patrol (1966) (Season 1 Episode 13: "The Lighthouse Raid") - Mathias, the lighthouse warden
- Combat! (1967) (TV Series) (Season 5 Episode 18: "Anniversary") - Robierre
- The King's Pirate (1967) - Captain Mission
- The Scorpio Letters (1967) - Garin
- Mission Impossible (1967) (Season 1 Episode 21: "Snowball in Hell") - Dr. Kronen
- Mission Impossible (1968) (Season 2 Episode 25: "Recovery") - Technician
- Don't Just Stand There! (1968) - Henri
- In Enemy Country (1968) - General Grieux
- The Hell with Heroes (1968) - Inspector Bouchard
- Kamouraska (1973) - Aubergiste
- An Adventure for Two (1979) - Le chef de police américain (American Police Chief)
- The Plouffe Family (1981) - Théophile, le pere Plouffe
- Frankenstein and Me (1996) - Judge Ewing
- A Day in a Life (2000) - George (final film role)
