= Big Red (film) =

1962 film by Norman Tokar

- Theatrical release poster
- Directed by: Norman Tokar
- Written by: Jim Kjelgaard (novel); Louis Pelletier
- Produced by: Walt Disney
- Starring: Walter Pidgeon; Gilles Payant; Émile Genest
- Cinematography: Edward Colman
- Edited by: Grant K. Smith
- Music by: Songs: Richard M. Sherman; Robert B. Sherman; Score: Oliver Wallace
- Production company: Walt Disney Productions
- Distributed by: Buena Vista Distribution
- Release date: June 6, 1962
- Running time: 89 minutes
- Countries: United States; Canada
- Language: English

Big Red is a 1962 adventure film from Walt Disney Productions. Based on a 1945 novel by American author Jim Kjelgaard and adapted to the screen by American screenwriter Louis Pelletier, the film starred Walter Pidgeon, a close friend of Walt Disney. Pidgeon who was born in Canada recommended some of the locations for the film.

Filmed in the province of Quebec, "Big Red" is an Irish Setter that would rather run through the woods than be the perfectly trained and groomed show dog his sportsman owner (Pidgeon) wants. A ten-year-old orphan boy (Payant) helps look after the dog and rebels against his owner's strict discipline of "Big Red".

== Plot ==
Big Red is a Champion Irish Setter; his new master Mr. Haggin wants him to be a show dog. Rene, an orphaned boy hired to take care of the dogs, gains the love and respect of Big Red.

When Mr. Haggin realizes that Big Red now sees Rene as his true master, he separates them and forbids Rene to see Red. Rene asks Emile, the other dog handler, why he has separated him from Red. Emile tells him that Red has to obey his master or he will not win at the show, and if he does not win Mr. Haggin will sell him. Rene asks Emile if he could just see Red for one minute, to say good-bye. When Emile will not let him, he waits until it is dark, then goes to the window, tells Red good-bye and then walks away. Red tries to get out of the house and finally jumps through a window, but he is cut by the glass.

They bandage him up but Mr. Haggin tells Emile to put him to sleep. When Emile comes back the dog is gone; Rene has taken Red to his cabin deep in the woods. Rene nurses Red back to health and then returns him to his master, who offers to give Rene his job back, but Rene refuses. When Mr. Haggin sees that Red has scars and will not be able to be a show dog, he says that he can use him to breed, but then changes his mind and decides to sell Red and the she-dog, Molly, that he had bought to go with him. On the train, the two dogs escape. When Rene hears about this, he sets out to find them and he later encounters Molly giving birth to the puppies inside the maternity den.

Mr. Haggin goes looking for Rene but has an entanglement with a mountain lion. After Rene and the dogs save him, Mr. Haggin makes a deal with Rene to come and live with him and keep the dogs. Rene agrees and they go home.

== Cast ==
- Walter Pidgeon as James Haggin
- Gilles Payant as Rene Dumont
- Émile Genest as Emile Fornet
- Janette Bertrand as Therese Fornet
- Georges Bouvier as Baggageman
- Doris Lussier as Farmer Mariot
- Rolland Bedard as Conductor
- Teddy Burns Goulet as Engineer

== Production ==
Filming partly occurred in Big Bear Lake, California.
