= There's Always a Way to Find a Way =

- French: Y'a toujours moyen de moyenner!
- Directed by: Denis Héroux
- Written by: Marcel Lefebvre
- Produced by: Denis Héroux
- Starring: Willie Lamothe; Jean-Guy Moreau; Dominique Michel
- Cinematography: René Verzier
- Edited by: Yves Langlois
- Music by: Marcel Lefebvre
- Release date: 1973
- Running time: 92 minutes
- Country: Canada
- Language: French

There's Always a Way to Find a Way (French: Y'a toujours moyen de moyenner!) is a Quebecois film directed by Denis Héroux and with a scenario by Marcel Lefebvre with input from Héroux, Guy Fournier, Gilles Gauthier, and Jean-Guy Moreau; it was released in 1973.

== Plot summary ==
A Quebec comedy about an ordinary man (Jean-Guy Moreau) and his overly active and imaginative brother-in-law (Willie Lamothe) who tells a lie about why he was late coming in to his bank-teller job. One thing leads to another, and confusion and mayhem are unleashed. An early film role for Quebec singing star Dominique Michel, who had a hit with the film's title song released as a duet with Lamothe.

== Cast ==
- Jean-Guy Moreau : Sam
- Yvan Ducharme : Yvan
- Willie Lamothe : Willie Turgeon
- Dominique Michel : The Mother Superior
- Danielle Ouimet : Marie
- Denise Pelletier
- Gilles Latulippe
- Roger Garand
- Aglaë
- Paul Berval
- Clémence DesRochers
- André Gagnon
- Benoît Marleau
- Paolo Noël
- Céline Bernier
- Jacques Bouchard
- Claude-Jean Devirieux
- Robert Desroches
- Marcel Fournier
- Robert Gillet
- Toto Gingras
- Raymond Guilbeault
- Nettie Harris
- Gaétan Lafrance
- Jacques Morency
- Diane Noël
- Fernand Patry
- François Piazza
- Simone Piuze
- Gilles Proulx
- Aimé Taillon
- Jean Guida
