= Follow Me, Boys! =

1966 American family film directed by Norman Tokar

- Theatrical release poster
- Directed by: Norman Tokar
- Screenplay by: Louis Pelletier
- Based on: God and My Country; 1954 novel by MacKinlay Kantor
- Produced by: Walt Disney; Winston Hibler
- Starring: Fred MacMurray; Vera Miles; Lillian Gish; Charles Ruggles; Elliott Reid; Kurt Russell; Luana Patten; Ken Murray
- Cinematography: Clifford Stine
- Edited by: Robert Stafford
- Music by: George Bruns; Richard M. Sherman; Robert B. Sherman
- Production company: Walt Disney Productions
- Distributed by: Buena Vista Distribution
- Release date: December 1, 1966
- Running time: 131 minutes
- Country: United States
- Language: English
- Box office: $16,207,116

Follow Me, Boys! is a 1966 American comedy-drama film produced by Walt Disney Productions. It is an adaptation of the 1954 novel God and My Country by MacKinlay Kantor and was the final film released by Walt Disney Productions in Walt Disney's lifetime, with Disney dying exactly two weeks after the film's premiere. The film stars Fred MacMurray, Vera Miles, Lillian Gish, Charles Ruggles, and Kurt Russell, and is co-produced by Walt Disney and Winston Hibler, directed by Norman Tokar and written by Louis Pelletier. It is one of the few films featuring the Boy Scouts of America and is Disney's paean to the Boy Scouts. The title song "Follow Me, Boys!" was written by studio favorites Robert and Richard Sherman. After the film's production, the Boy Scouts of America considered using the song as their anthem, but efforts toward the end were dropped. The Boys' Life magazine included a teaser article of the film. Follow Me, Boys! was the first of ten Disney films in which Russell appeared over the next ten years. A DVD version was released on February 3, 2004 by Walt Disney Home Entertainment, although it is in 4:3 pan and scan format, not the original 1.66:1 wide screen aspect ratio.

== Plot ==
In 1930, Lemuel "Lem" Siddons, a saxophonist in a traveling band, dreams of becoming a lawyer. When the band's bus reaches the small town of Hickory, Lem suddenly decides to leave the band and settle down, finding a job as a clerk in the general store owned by John Everett Hughes. At the town civic meeting, Lem again notices Vida Downey, a bank teller whom Lem had seen on his first day in town, and eventually attempts to woo away from her boyfriend Ralph Hastings. Lem notices Vida crosses off the YMCA and the 4-H from her list of three possible organizations to keep the town's boys off the streets, leaving only the Boy Scouts, and he decides to suggest and volunteer to become Scoutmaster of the newly formed Troop 1.

Some time later, Lem becomes an all-around natural leader with the Scout troop, even putting a plan to become a lawyer aside as he helps the town's boys mature into men. Meanwhile, the town's troublemaker boy, Edward "Whitey" White Jr., refuses to join the troop. One night, while Lem and Vida are on a date, they catch Whitey stealing from Hughes' store after it is closed for the night. Startled, Whitey falls and sprains his ankle, which Lem bandages using the techniques provided in the Boy Scout Handbook. Impressed by Lem's work, Whitey secretly steals the book, which Lem allows, because he sees his past self reflected in Whitey. One night, Lem invites Whitey's father, Edward Sr., to attend parents' night at the Boy Scouts' meeting place located on the lake property of Hetty Seibert, the owner of the bank and Ralph's aunt. Edward arrives drunk and embarrasses Whitey, causing him to quit the troop. However, Edward dies later that very night of alcohol poisoning, leaving Lem and Vida to adopt Whitey.

Years later, in 1944, Lem is out with his troop when he is accidentally captured by the United States Army, who are playing a war game in the area. Lem is taken for a spy due to his Scouting equipment and is unable to prove he is a Scoutmaster after the military captain asks Lem to tie a sheepshank, the only knot Lem never learned. Across the lake, Troop 1 fires their morning cannon, accidentally signaling the military to (wargames-style) attack the boys. The scouts take shelter in a staged base and successfully capture a tank with explosive squibs, meant to resemble land mines, thus freeing Lem from the captivity of the embarrassed military.

Back at the lake, Lem and the troop discover that Ralph is taking Hetty to court over the lake property, claiming that she is mentally unstable and needs a conservator (called a guardian in the film) to manage her financial affairs. Lem, who never passed the bar, is nonetheless allowed, as an interested party, to ask Hetty some questions at the hearing under oath. His questions of her on the stand reveal that the property was once the location of her family cottage before it burned down in September 1918, two days after she learned that her sons were killed in France. Hetty states that she allowed the troop to meet there, as the boys reminded her of her late sons at play. She also shows that she clearly understands what Ralph is trying to do and the financial trick he's planning on using the property for (as a tax haven). Ultimately, Hetty wins the case and the troop is allowed to keep the property.

On September 1, 1945, Lem and Vida celebrate Hughes' birthday by listening to Harry S. Truman announce the end of the war over the radio. Whitey, who became a captain in the army, returns to Hickory to introduce Lem and Vida to his wife, Nora, an army nurse. In 1950, Hughes passes away, leaving the store to both Lem and Vida. Meanwhile, due to Lem's health, the Scout committee forces Lem to retire as Scoutmaster. In appreciation for his two decades of service, the entire town gives Lem a surprise celebration on October 2, 1950, with both current and former members of Troop 1 in attendance for the dedication of Hetty's property as Camp Siddons to honor Lem.

== Cast ==
- Fred MacMurray – Lemuel "Lem" Siddons
- Vera Miles – Vida Downey
- Lillian Gish – Hetty Seibert
- Charlie Ruggles – John Everett Hughes
- Sean McClory – Edward White Sr.
- Kurt Russell – Edward "Whitey" White Jr.
- Donald May – Edward "Whitey" White Jr. as an adult
- Luana Patten – Nora White
- Elliott Reid – Ralph Hastings
- John Zaremba – Ralph Hastings's lawyer
- Ken Murray – Melody Murphy
- Parley Baer – Mayor Hi Plommer
- Steve Franken – P.O.W. lieutenant
- William Reynolds – Hoodoo Henderson (adult)
- Madge Blake – Cora Anderson
- Richard Bakalyan – Army war-game officer
- Jimmy Murphy – P.O.W. Soldier
- Adam Williams – P.O.W. sergeant

The Boys of Troop 1

- David Bailey – Duke
- Billy Booth – Leo
- Ronnie Dapo – Virgil "Tiger" Higgins
- Ricky Kelman – Frankie Martin
- Dean Moray – Hoodoo Henderson (child)
- Duane Chase – Joe

== Production ==
It was Ruggles' final film role. He continued working on television until 1968. Duane Chase, who played "Kurt" in The Sound of Music (1965), appears uncredited as one of the Boy Scouts. After this film, he left acting and thereafter only made professional appearances as himself at reunions with other Sound of Music cast members. Kurt Russell proved to be very popular in films produced by Walt Disney Productions. This was the first of seven films he made for the studio from the late 1960s through the mid 1970s.

== Reception ==
The film earned $5,350,000 in North American rentals (the cut of ticket sales sent to the studio) in 1967.

Bosley Crowther of The New York Times panned the film as "such a clutter of sentimental blubberings about the brotherhood of the Boy Scouts and indiscriminate ladling of cornball folksy comedy that it taxes the loyalty and patience of even a one-time ardent member of the Beaver Patrol ... What is most painful and embarrassing is the picture this film gives of the American small town as a haven for television-type comedians having themselves a fine time with a routine of rancid clichés." Variety was positive, stating that the film "catches the spirit of rural America in the '30s with moving charm, blending comedy, drama and romance in buildup toward an emotionally charged climax. 'Follow Me, Boys' is Disney at his best in this type of family entertainment." Philip K. Scheuer of the Los Angeles Times wrote that the film was "like a movie that might have been made 30 years ago. In thinking, approach, technique and every other way it could pass for a revival of the dear dead days beyond recall, and I sat there unbelieving that this many cliches could not only have been remembered but actually presented as something new." Richard L. Coe of The Washington Post stated, "'Follow Me, Boys' follows the formula, yet you will find it touching and heartening." Clifford Terry of the Chicago Tribune wrote, "Admittedly, there probably are enough chuckles and sniffles to satisfy the most rabid Disney devotees, but stretched out for more than two hours, the film seems almost as long as the 20 years it covers. Decidedly, far more imaginative and amusing products have been fashioned by the talent in Walt's workshop."

== Versions ==
The film ran 131 minutes originally. In 1976, the film was re-released to theaters in a heavily shortened version running 107 minutes. When the film first came to video in the United States in 1984, it ran 120 minutes. The 2004 DVD release is the complete 131-minute original theatrical cut.

== See also ==
- List of American films of 1966
- Lillian Gish filmography
