= Jacques Famery =

French actor

- Born: 20 July 1923; Vernon, Eure
- Died: 18 January 2014 (aged 90); Paris
- Occupation: Actor
- Years active: 1945 - 1993 (film)

Jacques Famery (July 20, 1923 – January 18, 2014) was a French film actor. Although known primarily for roles in the Cinema of France, he lived in Quebec for a time in the 1970s and was also a figure in the Cinema of Quebec during that time.

== Selected filmography ==
- My First Love (1945) - René
- Son of France (1946) - François
- Bichon (1948) - Jacques Fontange
- Memories Are Not for Sale (1948) - Georges
- Les vagabonds du rêve (1949) - Roger
- Le Furet (1950) - Achille Terrigny
- Death Threat (1950)
- Bibi Fricotin (1951) - Le reporter
- This Age Without Pity (1952) - Léon
- Puccini (1953) - Antonio Puccini
- The Sparrows of Paris (1953)
- The Lady of the Camellias (1953)- Un ami d'Armand
- Ce soir les jupons volent (1956) - Jean Roussel
- Les trois font la paire (1957) - Un clown / A clown
- Le Sahara brûle (1961)
- The Gendarmes of St. Tropez (1964) - Prince
- The Gorillas (1964)
- Les grandes vacances (1967)
- Finalement... (1971)
- Les chats bottés (1971) - Môman
- 7 fois... par jour (1971)
- Le diable est parmi nous (1972)
- The Rebels (Quelques arpents de neige) (1972)
- There's Nothing Wrong with Being Good to Yourself (C'est jeune et ça sait tout) - 1974
- Don't Push It (Pousse mais pousse égal) (1975)
- The Flower Between the Teeth (La fleur aux dents) (1976)
- Let's Talk About Love (Parlez-nous d'amour) (1976)
- The Little Girl Who Lives Down the Lane (1976) - Bank Clerk
- Bernie and the Gang (Ti-Mine, Bernie pis la gang...) - 1977
- Tête à claques (1982)
- Enigma (1982)
- Les Rois du gag (1985)
- Lévy et Goliath (1987)
- La Soif de l'or (1993) - Un acheteur (final film role)

== Bibliography ==
- Jean-Louis Ginibre, John Lithgow & Barbara Cady. Ladies Or Gentlemen: A Pictorial History of Male Cross-dressing in the Movies. Filipacchi Publishing, 2005.
