= Amico è =

Single by Dario Baldan Bembo and Caterina Caselli
- B-side: "Cammina cammina"
- Released: 1983
- Genre: Pop
- Label: Come Il Vento
- Songwriters: Dario Baldan Bembo, Sergio Bardotti, Nini Giacomelli

Dario Baldan Bembo singles chronology
"Tu cosa fai stasera?" (1981)	"Amico è" (1983)	"Voci di città" (1983)

Caterina Caselli singles chronology
"Seguila" (1975)	"Amico è" (1983)	"Bisognerebbe non pensare che a te" (1990)

"Amico è" is a 1983 song composed by Dario Baldan Bembo (music), Nini Giacomelli and Sergio Bardotti (lyrics), and performed by Baldan Bembo and Caterina Caselli.

A hymn to friendship, "Amico è" was the ending theme song of the Mike Bongiorno's quiz show SuperFlash. The song was also linked to a contest organized by the magazine TV Sorrisi e Canzoni, in which the readers should have identified four popular singers hidden among the choirs; in the last episode of the television show it was revealed they were Pupo, Ornella Vanoni, Giuni Russo and Gigliola Cinquetti.

Outside its immediate success, later the song became a widely spread football chant.

In the 1982 album Spirito della Terra, Baldan Bembo included a different version of the song titled "Falò" featuring Riccardo Fogli and Marcella Bella. The song was also covered by numerous artists, including Kikki Danielsson and Kjell Roos in a Swedish version titled "Vem går med dig hem" and Celine Dion in a French version titled "Hymne à l'amitié". Also, the mexican boyband Magneto, made a cover in spanish titled "Un Amigo es" in 1986, included in their album "Tremendo". Next year, in 1987 the singer-songwriter Lorenzo Antonio made a different cover, this version in spanish was interpreted by the famous Mexican singer Joan Sebastian and other singers as Byanka, Los Joao y Lisa Lopez and Lorenzo Antonio too. The song is titled "El amigo es".

== Track listing ==
7" single – ZCVE 50420

1. "Amico è" (Dario Baldan Bembo, Sergio Bardotti, Nini Giacomelli)
2. "Cammina cammina" (Dario Baldan Bembo, Sergio Bardotti, Nini Giacomelli)

== Charts ==
Chart	Peak position
Italy	5
