= Robert Desroches =

Canadian actor (1929–2021)

- Born: July 14, 1929; Montreal, Quebec, Canada
- Died: June 15, 2021 (aged 91)
- Occupation: Actor
- Children: 3

Robert Desroches (July 14, 1929 – June 15, 2021) was a Canadian actor. He was in the troupe at the Théâtre des Variétés for several decades.

== Filmography ==
=== Television ===
- Quatour (1958)
- CF-RCK (1958–1959)
- Ouragan (1959–1962)
- Filles d'Ève (1960–1964)
- Capitaine Bonhomme (1963)
- Cré Basile (1965)
- Moi et l'autre (1966)
- Lecoq et fils (1967–1968)
- Symphorien (1970)
- Quinze ans plus tard (1976–1977)
- Le Pont (1977–1978)
- Les As (1977–1978)
- Dominique (1977)
- Terre humaine (1978–1984)
- Duplessis (1978)
- Drôle de monde (1978)
- Les Brillant (1979–1982)
- Marisol (1980)
- Le Temps d'une paix (1980–1986)
- Marilyn (1991–1993)
- Montréal ville ouverte (1992)
- Scoop (1992)
- Virginie (1996–1997)

=== Cinema ===
- The Men (Les Mâles) - 1971
- There's Always a Way to Find a Way (Y'a toujours moyen de moyenner) - 1973
- There's Nothing Wrong with Being Good to Yourself (C'est jeune et ça sait tout) - 1974
- The Apprenticeship of Duddy Kravitz - 1974
- J.A. Martin Photographer (J.A. Martin photographe) - 1977
- Scandale - 1982
