= Ed Graves =

American art director (1917–1980)

- Born: Edgar A. Graves; 24 February 1917
- Died: 17 February 1980 (aged 62); Thousand Oaks, California
- Occupation: Art director
- Years active: 1965–1980

Edgar A. Graves (24 February 1917 – 17 February 1980) was an American art director. He was nominated for an Academy Award in the category Best Art Direction for the film Doctor Dolittle.

== Selected filmography ==
- Doctor Dolittle (1967)
- Bayou Boy (1971)
