= Nikki: Wild Dog of the North =

1961 film

- Theatrical release poster
- Directed by: Jack Couffer; Don Haldane
- Screenplay by: Ralph Wright; Winston Hibler
- Story by: Don Haldane
- Based on: Nomads of the North by James Oliver Curwood
- Produced by: Winston Hibler
- Starring: Jean Coutu; Émile Genest; Uriel Luft; Robert Rivard; Nikki; Jacques Fauteux
- Cinematography: William W. Bacon III; Lloyd Beebe; Jack Couffer; Ray Jewell; Donald Wilder
- Edited by: Grant K. Smith
- Music by: Oliver Wallace
- Color process: Technicolor
- Production company: Walt Disney Productions
- Distributed by: Buena Vista Distribution
- Release date: July 12, 1961
- Running time: 73 minutes
- Countries: United States; Canada
- Language: English
- Box office: $2.1 million

Nikki: Wild Dog of the North is a 1961 adventure film directed by Jack Couffer and Don Haldane. The plot, based on the novel Nomads of the North by James Oliver Curwood, centers around the adventures of a malamute dog named Nikki.

== Plot ==
In 1899, Nikki and his kind master, Andre Dupas (Jean Coutu), are traveling via canoe through the Canadian Rockies. When Nikki encounters Neewa, a black bear cub whose mother was killed by a grizzly bear named Makoos, Andre ties the two animals together, plops them in the canoe, and heads for the rapids. When the two animals become separated from Andre, the unlikely pair must learn to survive in the wilderness. When they reach land, they are forced to overcome the instinct that makes them natural enemies and join together in a search for food and shelter. Despite many fights, they eventually become friends and remain together even after their leash breaks.

With the coming of winter Neewa goes into hibernation and Nikki wanders off alone. He steals the bait from traps until he is captured by a vicious trapper named Jacques Lebeau (Émile Genest) and his reluctant Indian companion, Makoki (Uriel Luft). After watching the now full-grown dog kill a wolf in spite of the trap, Lebeau decides to train Nikki as a fighting dog although pit-fighting is illegal. When André, the new factor, challenges Lebeau for breaking the law, he is pushed into the pit with the brutalized killer dog. Nikki recognizes his old master, however, and joins André in fighting Lebeau, who is accidentally killed with his own knife. Later, while on a trip to André's trap line, Nikki spots his old friend, Neewa, but the dog realizes that the full-grown bear is happier roaming the wilds, and he chooses to remain by André's side.

== Cast ==
- Jean Coutu as Andre Dupas
- Émile Genest as Jacques Lebeau (as Emile Genest)
- Uriel Luft as Makoki
- Robert Rivard as Durante
- Nikki as Self
- Jacques Fauteux as Narrator

== Reception ==
The film won the 1962 Eddie from the American Cinema Editors for Best Edited Special (Documentary).

== See also ==
- List of American films of 1961
