= Diane Guérin =

Canadian actress and singer (1948–2022)

- Born: 4 April 1948; Lachine, Montreal, Quebec, Canada
- Died: 18 September 2022 (aged 74)
- Occupations: Actress; Singer

Diane Guérin (4 April 1948 – 18 September 2022), also known as Belgazou, was a Canadian actress and singer.

== Biography ==
Known for her friendly persona, Belgazou became popular in the 1980s for her music, with titles such as "Quitter ton île", "Entre Mozart et Jagger", and "Talk about it". She was frequently lampooned by comedy group Rock et Belles Oreilles. In 1991, she resumed usage of her birth name, Diane Guérin. She began singing in duets with her husband, Christian Montmarquette, under the name Diane et Christian. They performed in bars in Montreal and Quebec City. They also performed in Miami alongside Johnny Farago.

Guérin died on 18 September 2022, at the age of 74.

== Discography ==
- Belgazou (1982)
- Fly (1984)
- Les Yeux de la faim (1985)
- Où va la vie (1987)
- J'l'aime encore (1991)

== Filmography ==
- Sol et Gobelet - 1969
- The Doves (Les Colombes) - 1972
- The Mob (La Gammick) - 1975
- Let's Talk About Love (Parlez-nous d'amour) - 1976
- Réseaux - 1998
