= Jean-Claude Lord =

Canadian film director and screenwriter (1943–2022)

- Born: 6 June 1943; Montreal, Quebec, Canada
- Died: 15 January 2022 (aged 78); Dublin, Ireland
- Occupations: Film director screenwriter
- Years active: 1964–2022
- Children: 2

Jean-Claude Lord (6 June 1943 – 15 January 2022) was a Canadian film director and screenwriter. He was one of the most commercial of the Québécois directors in the 1970s, aiming his feature films at a mass audience and dealing with political themes in a mainstream, Hollywood style.

== Early life ==
Lord was born in Montreal on 6 June 1943. He first worked as an assistant director and scriptwriter in the private sector. He was an apprentice to Pierre Patry at the company Coopératio.

== Career ==
Lord's first feature was Délivrez-nous du mal, released in 1965. It depicted a gay couple, reportedly a first for a Québécois film and regarded as a breakthrough since the influence of the Catholic Church was still strong in Quebec. His 1974 film Bingo exploits the post-October Crisis, post-Watergate paranoia prevalent in North America at the time with considerable panache. It was the subject of an intensive critical debate about its credentials as a left-wing film.

Lord directed his first English-language film, Visiting Hours, in 1982. The low-budget horror movie, which featured William Shatner and Michael Ironside, became a cult favourite. Four years later, Lord worked for the first time in television on the series Lance et Compte. It centred around a fictitious ice hockey team, whose uniforms were similar to the Quebec Nordiques, contending for the Stanley Cup and the World Cup of Hockey. The series – which ran from 1986 to 1989 – was credited with establishing a new benchmark for television shows in Quebec. It also aired in English on CBC as He Shoots, He Scores, and was shown in France in 1987. He won a Prix Gémeaux in 1987 for the series.

In 1988, Lord directed the family film La Grenouille et la Baleine . The film starred Fanny Lauzier as Daphne, a young girl with an exceptional relationship with whales and dolphins due to her highly developed hearing. Her life changes when her grandfather decides to sell the seaside inn where she lives. This was the sixth and most popular film in the Contes pour tous series. It was awarded and showcased at various international festivals, with 240,000 viewers in theaters, making it the largest Canadian audience of 1989.

Lord subsequently worked primarily in television on several other series and made-for-TV movies. He directed the revival of Lance et Compte that aired from 2000 until 2008. He was conferred the Prix Guy-Mauffette by the National Assembly of Quebec in November 2017, in recognition of the contributions he made to the audiovisual industry and culture.

== Personal life ==
Lord was in a domestic partnership with Lise Thouin. Together, they had two children: Marie-Noëlle and Jean-Sébastien, who is also a film and television director, most noted for the films Heaven (Le petit ciel) and Guardian Angel (L'Ange-gardien).

Lord died on the evening of 15 January 2022. He was 78, and had suffered a major stroke on 30 December of the previous year.

== Filmography ==
=== Features ===
- Deliver Us from Evil (Délivrez-nous du mal) – 1969
- The Doves (Les Colombes) – 1972
- Bingo – 1974
- Let's Talk About Love (Parlez-nous d'amour) – 1976
- Panic (Panique) – 1977
- Chocolate Eclair (Éclair au chocolat) – 1979
- Visiting Hours – 1982
- Covergirl – 1984
- The Vindicator – 1986
- Toby McTeague – 1986
- The Tadpole and the Whale (La Grenouille et la baleine) – 1988
- Mindfield (La mémoire assassinée) – 1989
- Eddie and the Cruisers II: Eddie Lives! – 1989
- Landslide – 1992
- North Station (Station Nord) – 2002

=== Television ===
- Lance et Compte (TV series, 1986) {aka He Shoots, He Scores (English) and Cogne et Gagne (France)}
- Urban Angel (TV series, 1991)
- Sirens (TV series, 1994–1995)
- Jasmine (TV series, 1996)
- Lobby (TV series, 1997)
- Diva (TV series, 1997)
- Maurice Richard: Histoire d'un Canadien (TV miniseries Co-Directed with Pauline Payette, 1999)
- Quadra (TV series, 2000)
- L'or (TV series, 2001)
- Galidor: Defenders of the Outer Dimension (TV series, 2002)
- Lance et Compte: La nouvelle génération (TV series, 2002)
- Lance et Compte: La reconquete (TV series, 2004)
- Lance et Compte: La revanche (TV series, 2006)
- Lance et Compte: Le grand duel (TV series, 2009)
- Secrets of the Summer House (TV movie, 2008)
- Out of Control (TV movie, 2009)
- Ring of Deceit (TV movie, 2009)
- Second Chances (TV movie, 2010)
