= Fais ce que tu voudras =

Single by Celine Dion

from the album Les chansons en or
- Language: French
- B-side: "Tu es là"
- Released: June 1986
- Genre: Pop
- Length: 3:42
- Label: TBS
- Songwriters: Eddy Marnay; René Grignon
- Producer: Eddy Marnay

Celine Dion singles chronology
"La ballade de Michel" (1985)	"Fais ce que tu voudras" (1986)	"On traverse un miroir" (1987)

Audio
- "Fais ce que tu voudras" on YouTube

"Fais ce que tu voudras" (lit. 'Do whatever you want') is a song written by composer René Grignon and French lyricist Eddy Marnay. It is the first and only single from Celine Dion's greatest hits album Les chansons en or. It was released in June 1986 in Quebec, Canada.

== Background ==
On 14 June 1986, the ballad entered the Quebec Singles Chart, where it peaked at number 36 and remained for 12 weeks.

The B-side includes "Tu es là", taken from the album C'est pour toi.

Dion filmed her first French-language music video for the single in 1986. Directed by François Girard, it shows Dion at a train station. The video is available on the DVD On ne change pas (2005). It was her second music video, following the English-language "Listen to the Magic Man".

The title refers to a proverb coined by French Renaissance writer François Rabelais, later adopted as a central maxim of the modern thelemic movement in the English rendering by Aleister Crowley: "Do what thou wilt".

== Formats and track listing ==
- Canadian 7-inch single
1. "Fais ce que tu voudras" – 3:42
2. "Tu es là" – 2:43

== Charts ==
Chart performance
Chart (1986)	Peak position
Quebec (ADISQ)	36
