= Une colombe =

Single by Celine Dion

from the album Mélanie
- Language: French
- B-side: "Une colombe" (instrumental)
- Released: June 1984
- Studio: St-Charles (Longueuil)
- Genre: Pop
- Length: 3:10
- Label: Triangle
- Songwriters: Marcel Lefebvre; Paul Baillargeon
- Producers: Paul Baillargeon; Marcel Lefebvre; René Angélil

Celine Dion singles chronology
"Ne me plaignez pas" (1984)	"Une colombe" (1984)	"Mon rêve de toujours" (1984)

Audio
- "Une colombe" on YouTube

"Une colombe" (lit. 'A dove') is the first single from Celine Dion's album Mélanie. It was issued in June 1984 in Quebec, Canada. The song was written by Marcel Lefebvre and Paul Baillargeon. Its lyrics describe a world guided by peace, love, and friendship.

On 10 September 1984, Dion performed "Une colombe" for Pope John Paul II and 65,000 people at the Olympic Stadium in Montreal, Quebec. The single received two Félix Awards: Best Selling Single of the Year, and Pop Song of the Year. It later appeared on Dion's 2005 greatest hits album, On ne change pas.

== Commercial performance ==
The single became a major success. On 30 June 1984, it entered the Quebec Singles Chart and peaked at number two, remaining on the chart for 44 weeks. It sold over 50,000 copies in Canada and was certified gold in November 1984.

== Formats and track listing ==
- Canadian 7-inch single
1. "Une colombe" – 3:10
2. "Une colombe" (instrumental) – 3:10

== Charts ==
Chart performance
Chart (1984)	Peak position
Quebec (ADISQ)	2

== Certifications and sales ==
Region	Certification	Certified units/sales
Canada (Music Canada)	Gold	50,000^{^}
^{^} Shipments figures based on certification alone.
