= The Rebels (1972 film) =

- French: Quelques arpents de neige
- Directed by: Denis Héroux
- Screenplay by: Gilles Élie; Marcel Lefebvre
- Produced by: Claude Héroux
- Starring: Daniel Pilon; Christine Olivier; Jean Duceppe
- Cinematography: Bernard Chentrier
- Edited by: Mélanie Gelman; Yves Langlois
- Music by: François Cousineau
- Production company: Cinévidéo
- Distributed by: Les Films Mutuels
- Release date: 1972
- Running time: 95 minutes
- Country: Canada
- Language: French

The Rebels (French: Quelques arpents de neige) is a Canadian drama film, directed by Denis Héroux and released in 1972. A historical drama set during the Lower Canada Rebellion of 1837, the film centres on the romance between Simon de Bellefeuille (Daniel Pilon), a rebel in the village of Saint-Benoît, and Julie Lambert (Christine Olivier).

The film's cast also includes Mylène Demongeot, Jean Duceppe, Frédéric de Pasquale, Daniel Gadouas, Roland Chenail, Rose-Rey Duzil, Gérard Poirier, Yvan Ducharme, Jacques Desrosiers, Jean Coutu, Bertrand Gagnon, José Descombes, Barry Baldaro, Dave Broadfoot, Jacques Famery and Jacques Thisdale.

The French title comes from Voltaire's infamous dismissal of New France as "a few acres of snow (quelques arpents de neige)".

The film was entered into the Best Motion Picture competition at the 24th Canadian Film Awards.
