= Duane Chase =

American actor

- Born: December 12, 1950 (age 75)
- Spouse: Petra Maria (m. 1987)

Duane Chase (born 12 December 1950) is an American geologist, forester, and former actor who appeared as Kurt von Trapp in The Sound of Music (1965). He also had a small role in the family film Follow Me, Boys! (1966) and played Danny Matthews in The Big Valley for one episode.

== Biography ==
During the summer of 1969, Chase joined the United States Forest Service in Santa Barbara, California, after graduating from Rolling Hills High School of Rolling Hills, California. He then enrolled at the University of California, Santa Barbara and graduated in 1976 with a B.S. in geology. After working at a Chevron refinery in Denver for a year, Chase then enrolled at the University of Alabama and earned a master's degree in geology.

== Personal life ==
Chase lives in Washington State and is returning to wildlife and forestry work. He is married to Petra Maria, a registered nurse who was born in Hamburg, Germany.
