= Un amour pour moi =

Single by Celine Dion

from the album Mélanie
- Language: French
- B-side: "Comme on disait avant"
- Released: February 1985
- Studio: Montmartre (Paris)
- Genre: Pop
- Length: 3:20
- Label: TBS
- Songwriters: Eddy Marnay; Christian Loigerot; Thierry Geoffroy
- Producers: Eddy Marnay; Rudi Pascal

Celine Dion singles chronology
"Mon rêve de toujours" (1984)	"Un amour pour moi" (1985)	"Vois comme c'est beau" (1985)

Audio
- "Un amour pour moi" on YouTube

"Un amour pour moi" (lit. 'A love for me') is the third single from Celine Dion's album Mélanie. It was issued in February 1985 in Quebec, Canada. The B-side includes another album track, "Comme on disait avant". The song also appeared on Dion's French album Les oiseaux du bonheur, released the same year. On 9 March 1985, it entered the Quebec chart, where it spent 19 weeks and reached number 12.

== Formats and track listing ==
- Canadian 7-inch single
1. "Un amour pour moi" – 3:20
2. "Comme on disait avant" – 3:30

== Charts ==
Chart performance
Chart (1985)	Peak position
Quebec (ADISQ)	12
