= Son of France =

1946 film

- Directed by: Pierre Blondy
- Written by: Pierre Lestringuez
- Starring: Jean Mercanton; Jimmy Gaillard; Jacques Famery
- Cinematography: André Germain
- Music by: Guy Bernard
- Production company: Productions Sigma
- Release date: 15 May 1946
- Running time: 90 minutes
- Country: France
- Language: French

Son of France (French: Fils de France) is a 1946 French drama film directed by Pierre Blondy and starring Jean Mercanton, Jimmy Gaillard and Jacques Famery. It was made with the assistance of the French Army Film Service.

== Cast ==
- Jean Mercanton as Hans
- Jimmy Gaillard as Yves
- Jacques Famery as François
- Émile Genevois as Marcel
- Jean Daurand as Le maréchal des logis Gobert
- Ginette Baudin as Gretel
- Jean Gaven as Le lieutenant Brévannes
- Lucien Blondeau as Le colonel
- Louis Florencie as Le commandant
- Raymone
- Odette Barencey as Mme Chatin
- Lise Bravo
- Georges Sauval
- Gérard Blain
- Luce Fabiole

== Bibliography ==
- Henry Rousso & Arthur Goldhammer. The Vichy syndrome: history and memory in France since 1944. Harvard University Press, 1994.
