= Françoise Graton =

Canadian actress

- Born: 4 June 1930; Montreal, Quebec, Canada
- Died: 7 November 2014 (aged 84); Montreal
- Occupations: Actress, theatre director
- Years active: c.1960–2009
- Known for: Nouvelle Compagnie Théâtrale
- Partner: Gilles Pelletier

Françoise Graton (4 June 1930 – 7 November 2014) was a Québécoise actress who lived and worked in Montreal, Quebec, Canada. She contributed much to the advancement of theatre in Montreal and particularly in involvement with children.

== Biography ==
After studying at the Collège Marie de France, Françoise Graton joined the Mask Company and started at a very young age on stage and on television. For a few seasons, she directed the theatre at the Percé Art Center. In 1964 she founded the Nouvelle Compagnie Théâtrale (NCT) with Georges Groulx and Gilles Pelletier, her companion in life. The Montreal company presented great works of theatre to students. Graton acted, hosted, directed and administrated the theatre for almost twenty years. In 1997, the NCT was renamed the Théâtre Denise-Pelletier.

Graton acted in many plays, several television dramas and series, and Quebec films. In 1971 and 1982 she was named Woman of the Year by the Salon de la femme. She was recognized by the Académie québécoise du théâtre in 1994, and received the prize of the Société québécoise d'études théâtre in 2001. During Public School Week in 2013, on the 50th anniversary of the NCT, the Federation of Education presented its Prix Hommage (tribute prize) to Graton and Pelletier.

Graton died in Montreal on 7 November 2014, following a fall.

In a special tribute to Graton on 2 November 2015, a one-night show brought together dozens of great names from Quebec theatre, who reprised some of their most noted roles from the past 50 years while raising donations for the Théâtre Denise-Pelletier.

The archives of Françoise Graton are kept in the Montreal archives of the Bibliothèque et Archives nationales du Québec (BAnQ).

== Filmography ==
- L'Île aux trésors (1953–54 TV series) – Nouki
- La famille Plouffe (1953–1959 TV series) – Hélène Giguère
- Cap-aux-sorciers (1955–1958 TV series) – Sylvette
- Les Forges de Saint-Maurice (1972–1975 TV series)
- Terre humaine (1978–1984 TV series)
- The Tin Flute (1983, French: Bonheur d'occasion) – Mme Letourneau
- Chartrand et Simonne (2000–2003 TV series) – Hélène Chartrand
- La Vie, la vie (2001–02 TV series) – Cécile
- Providence (2005 TV series) – Gisèle Lemieux
- Days of Darkness (2007, French: L'Âge des ténèbres) – Madame Leblanc
- Romaine par moins 30 (2009) – Agnès Obadia
- Aveux (2009) – Grand-Maman Julie
