= Tadpole and the Whale =

- Film poster from Quebec's initial release
- French: La Grenouille et la baleine
- Directed by: Jean-Claude Lord
- Written by: Jean-Claude Lord; Lise Thouin; Jacques Bobet; André Melançon
- Produced by: Rock Demers
- Starring: Fanny Lauzier; Denis Forest; Marina Orsini
- Cinematography: Thomas Burstyn
- Edited by: Hélène Girard
- Production company: Les Productions La Fête
- Distributed by: Cinéma Plus Distribution
- Release date: June 17, 1988
- Running time: 91 minutes
- Country: Canada
- Languages: French, English
- Box office: C$1.79 million (Quebec)

Tadpole and the Whale (French: La Grenouille et la baleine) is a Canadian children's fantasy film, directed by Jean-Claude Lord and released in 1988 as part of the Tales for All series.

The film stars Fanny Lauzier as Daphné, a young girl living in Mingan, Quebec who has developed the ability to breathe underwater, and who has befriended the dolphins and the whales living near the town in the Gulf of St. Lawrence. The film's cast also includes Denis Forest, Marina Orsini, Félix-Antoine Leroux, Jean Lajeunesse, Lise Thouin, Louise Richer, Thomas Donohue, Roland Laroche, Pierre-Olivier Gagnon, Jean-Pierre Leduc, Jean Lafontaine, Jean Lemire, André Doyle, Claude Grisé and Alie Lavoie Gray.

The film garnered three Genie Award nominations at the 10th Genie Awards in 1989, including Best Original Screenplay, Best Cinematography (Thomas Burstyn) and Best Original Song for "We Are One (Sous la mer)" (Normand Dubé, Guy Trépanier and Nathalie Carson). It also won the Golden Reel Award as the year's top-grossing Canadian film with a gross of C$1.79 million just from Quebec, before it had even opened in English Canada.
