= Bingo (1974 film) =

1974 film by Jean-Claude Lord

- Directed by: Jean-Claude Lord
- Written by: Jean-Claude Lord; Roch Poisson; Lise Thouin; Michel Capistran; Jean Salvy
- Produced by: Pierre David; Louise Ranger
- Starring: Réjean Guénette; Anne-Marie Provencher; Claude Michaud; Alexandra Stewart; Gilles Pelletier
- Cinematography: Claude La Rue; François Protat
- Edited by: Jean-Claude Lord
- Music by: Michel Comte
- Production company: Les Films Mutuels
- Distributed by: Ambassador Film Distributors (Canada); Michèle Dimitri Films (France); Les Films Mutuels (all media)
- Release date: March 14, 1974
- Running time: 113 minutes
- Country: Canada
- Language: French
- Budget: $400,000
- Box office: $1.5 million (Canada)

Bingo is a 1974 French-Canadian thriller directed by Jean-Claude Lord. The plot relates to Quebec's October Crisis of 1970.

== Synopsis ==
Director Jean-Claude Lord exploits the post-October Crisis paranoia that was rampant in Quebec with considerable panache with this skilful melodrama. Although the story is not about the events leading up to the War Measures Act, it does draw upon the fabric and feelings of that time. A young photographer (Réjean Guénette) becomes unwittingly entangled in a terrorist organization, which engages in a plot against prominent politicians and business leaders before an upcoming election. The film was hugely popular in Quebec and established Lord as a major director with this, his third feature.

== Soundtrack ==
Lord's wife, and co-screenwriter, the actress Lise Thouin released "Bingo", written by Michel Conte as a single.

== Reception ==
The film was well received in Quebec but failed to find an audience elsewhere, grossing $1.5 million in Canada.
