= Jim Kjelgaard =

American author (1910–1959)

- Born: December 6, 1910; New York, New York, United States
- Died: July 12, 1959 (aged 48); Milwaukee, Wisconsin, United States
- Occupation: Author
- Writing career
- Period: 1938 to 1959
- Genres: juvenile fiction (novels), children's literature, young adult literature
- Subjects: Animals, outdoors
- Notable work: Big Red

James Arthur Kjelgaard (December 6, 1910 – July 12, 1959) was an American author of young adult literature.

== Early life and education ==
Kjelgaard was born in New York City, New York, on December 6, 1910. Jim's father, Carroll W. Kjelgaard, was a physician, happily married with five sons and one daughter. Kjelgaard was the fourth oldest. He and his siblings lived on a seven hundred fifty acre farm in the Allegheny Mountains of Pennsylvania during his childhood. It was the outdoors which provided a playground for all the children. Dave Drakula, writing in Jim Kjelgaard – From the Bigwoods to Hollywood, recounted a time when Kjelgaard and his brother Henry were outside playing when Kjelgaard spotted a bear. Kjelgaard and Henry climbed up the apple tree to escape the bear. Once the bear was gone Kjelgaard got down from the tree screaming and yelling as he ran into the house. In the meantime, Henry was too small to get out of the tree himself and was stuck there. The bear came back again and stared Henry down with Kjelgaard laughing in the distance. This is where Kjelgaard's first love of bears comes from and later appeared in his books such as Buckskin Brigade (1947).

As a child, Kjelgaard liked to read. Although his family was often low on money, Kjelgaard's parents always tried to support Kjelgaard and provide as many books for him as they could. The family's farming venture failed and Jim and his family moved to Galeton, Pennsylvania. It was at that point that Kjelgaard began to show interest in writing. Kjelgaard made a desk out of a box so that he could start writing poems and stories on a typewriter. In addition, Kjelgaard was becoming an avid hunter, trapper, and fisherman, and his love for dogs was unlimited. Unfortunately, during this time Kjelgaard began to have symptoms of epilepsy. He was brought to Johns Hopkins Hospital in Baltimore, Maryland, where his problem was diagnosed as a tumor but he did not have to have surgery at the time. Kjelgaard was still able to continue on with his life and adventures and show his love for the outdoors.

== Career ==
Kjelgaard wrote more than 40 novels, the most famous of which is 1945's Big Red. It sold 225,000 copies by 1956 and was made into a 1962 Walt Disney film of the same name.

His books were primarily about dogs and wild animals, often with animal protagonists and told from the animal's point of view. Kjelgaard also wrote short fiction for several magazines, including The Saturday Evening Post, Argosy, and Adventure.

== Personal life and final years ==
After suffering for several years from chronic pain and depression, in 1959 Kjelgaard committed suicide at the age of 48.

== List of works ==
- Forest Patrol (1941)
- Rebel Siege (1943)
- Big Red (1945)
- The Fangs of Tsan-Lo (1945)
- Buckskin Brigade (1947)
- Snow Dog (1948)
- Kalak of the Ice (1949)
- A Nose for Trouble (1949)
- Wild Trek (1950)
- Chip the Dam Builder (1950)
- Irish Red, Son of Big Red (1951)
- Fire-Hunter (1951)
- The Explorations of Pere Marquette (1951)
- Trailing Trouble (1952)
- Outlaw Red, Son of Big Red (1953)
- The Spell of the White Sturgeon (1953)
- The Coming of the Mormons (1953)
- Haunt Fox (1954)
- Cracker Barrel Trouble Shooter (1954)
- Lion Hound (1955)
- The Lost Wagon (1955)
- Desert Dog (1956)
- Trading Jeff and His Dog (1956)
- Wildlife Cameraman (1957)
- Cochise, Chief of Warriors (1957) - unpublished? Listed in some of his other books.
- Double Challenge (1957)
- We Were There at the Oklahoma Land Run (1957)
- Wolf Brother (1957)
- Swamp Cat (1957)
- Rescue Dog of the High Pass (1958)
- The Land Is Bright (1958)
- The Black Fawn (1958)
- The Story of Geronimo (1958)
- Hi Jolly (1959)
- Stormy (1959)
- Ulysses & His Woodland Zoo (1960)
- Boomerang Hunter (1960)
- The Duck-Footed Hound (1960)
- Tigre (1961)
- Hidden Trail (1962)
- Fawn in the Forest & other Wild Animal Stories (1962)
- Two Dogs & a Horse (1964)
- Furious Moose of the Wilderness (1965)
- Dave and His Dog, Mulligan (1966)
- Coyote Song (1969)
