= Sylvie Léonard =

French-Canadian actress (born 1955)

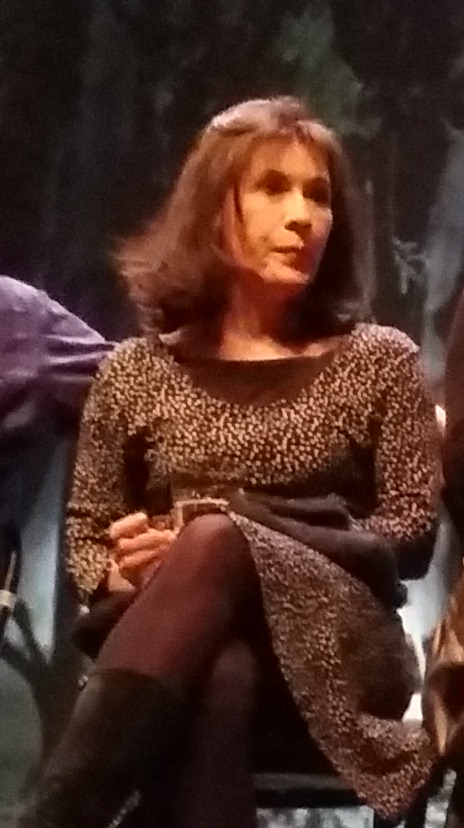
- Sylvie Léonard in 2016.
- Born: July 17, 1955 (age 69); Montréal, Québec
- Education: Cégep de St-Hyacinthe (Option Théatre)
- Occupation: Actress
- Years active: 1979-
- Notable work: Un gars, une fille
- Children: Camille Léonard-Rioux

Sylvie Léonard (born July 17, 1955) is a French-Canadian actress. She has acted in theater, film and television for over 40 years. Her most notable roles include Mimi Jarry in Rue des Pignons, Annick Jacquemin in Terre Humaine, Julie Galarneau in L'Héritage, Sylvie in Un gars, une fille and most recently Madeleine in Lâcher prise.

== Awards ==
- Prix Gémeaux 1989 – Best actress in a drama series for L'Héritage
- Prix Gémeaux 1998, 1999, 2000 and 2002 – Best actress in a comedy series for Un gars, une fille
- Prix Gémeaux 1999 – Best co-author in a comedy series for Un gars, une fille
- Prix Gémeaux 2008 – Best actress in a drama series for Vice Caché
- Prix Gémeaux 2012 – Best supporting role in a drama series for Le Gentleman
