= Ce n'était qu'un rêve =

Single by Celine Dion

from the album La voix du bon Dieu
- Language: French
- B-side: "Ce n'était qu'un rêve" (instrumental)
- Released: 11 June 1981
- Recorded: 1981
- Studio: St-Charles (Longueuil)
- Genre: Pop
- Length: 3:46
- Label: Showbizz; Pathé‑Marconi
- Songwriters: Thérèse Dion; Celine Dion; Jacques Dion
- Producers: Daniel Hétu; René Angélil

Celine Dion singles chronology
"Ce n'était qu'un rêve" (1981)	"La voix du bon Dieu" (1981)

Audio
- "Ce n'etait qu'un reve" on YouTube

"Ce n'était qu'un rêve" (lit. 'It was only a dream') is the debut single by Canadian singer Celine Dion, released on 11 June 1981 in Quebec, Canada. The song appears on her first album, La voix du bon Dieu (1981). Written by Dion, her mother Thérèse and her brother Jacques, it was produced by Daniel Hétu and René Angélil. The single reached number eight on the Quebec chart and was later included on Dion's 2005 greatest hits compilation On ne change pas.

== Background and release ==
At age 12, Dion collaborated with her mother and brother Jacques to write and compose "Ce n'était qu'un rêve". A demo recording was sent by her brother Michel to music manager René Angélil, whose name he found on the back of a Ginette Reno album. After hearing Dion's voice, Angélil decided to support her career and subsequently became her manager.

"Ce n'était qu'un rêve" was issued as a 7-inch single on 11 June 1981 by Les Disques Showbizz. Dion made her first televised appearance on 19 June 1981, performing the song on a Quebec talk show hosted by Michel Jasmin. The single was released in France by Pathé Records in 1982.

== Live performances ==
Dion performed "Ce n'était qu'un rêve" throughout her early career and continued to revisit it in later tours. A live version appears on The Colour of My Love Concert VHS/DVD (1995). A shortened rendition was included on the Au cœur du stade CD (1999), the Au cœur du stade DVD (1999), and the Céline une seule fois / Live 2013 CD/DVD (2014).

== Commercial performance ==
The song entered the Quebec chart on 29 August 1981, spending six weeks on the ranking and peaking at number eight.

== Formats and track listing ==
- Canadian 7-inch single
1. "Ce n'était qu'un rêve" – 3:46
2. "Ce n'était qu'un rêve" (instrumental) – 3:46
- French 7-inch single
1. "Ce n'était qu'un rêve" – 3:47
2. "L'amour viendra" – 4:20

== Charts ==
Chart performance
Chart (1981)	Peak position
Quebec (ADISQ)	8
