= Yvan Ducharme =

- Born: 24 August 1937; Rouyn-Noranda, Quebec
- Died: 21 March 2013 (aged 75); Laval, Quebec
- Occupations: actor, comedian

Yvan Ducharme was a québécois actor (24 August 1937, in Rouyn-Noranda – 21 March 2013, in Laval, Quebec).

== Biography ==
Ducharme was first known to the public thanks to his creation of Insolences d'un téléphone shown during the day in 1963 on CJMS in Montreal for more than a decade.

He became popular on Quebec television with the role of the father in Les Berger and won many awards including Monsieur Télévision in 1972.

Ducharme also painted for many years in his apartment in Montreal. He created his own abstract style which he named "impulsionnism". The most recent creations of Yvan Ducharme were shown in Montreal in February 2007, in Longueuil in May 2007, and in Rouyn-Noranda, his place of birth, in August 2007.

Ducharme died on 21 March 2013 from chronic obstructive pulmonary disease. He was 75.

== Filmography ==
- 1965 : Pas de vacances pour les idoles
- 1969 : Valérie : Le gérant de Club
- 1970 - 1976 : Les Berger (TV series) : Guy Berger
- 1971 : Let's Call the Whole Thing Orff (TV series)
- 1972 : The Rebels (Quelques arpents de neige)
- 1973 : Enuff Is Enuff (J'ai mon voyage!)
- 1973 : There's Always a Way to Find a Way (Y'a toujours moyen de moyenner!) : Yvan
- 1974 : Bulldozer : Mainchaude
- 1980 : Suzanne : Eddy
- 1976 : Du tac au tac (TV series) : Buddy Taillefer (1980–1982)
- 1982 : Visiting Hours : Policeman 1
- 1994 : The Wind from Wyoming (Le Vent du Wyoming) : Légionnaire
- 2000 : Chartrand et Simonne (TV series) : Contremaître
- 2000 : 2001: A Space Travesty : Famous Tenor #3
- 2004 : Happy Camper (Camping sauvage) : Père de Bouton

== Awards and nominations ==
=== Awards ===
- 1963 : Comedy radio show of the year Ducharme au réveil & Les insolences d'un téléphone
- 1965 : Radio show of the year Ducharme au réveil & Les insolences d'un téléphone
- 1968 : Radio personality of the year
- 1972 : Monsieur Télévision
