= Mon rêve de toujours =

Single by Celine Dion

from the album Mélanie
- Language: French
- B-side: "Chante-moi"
- Released: September 1984
- Studio: Montmartre (Paris)
- Genre: Pop
- Length: 4:17
- Label: TBS; Pathé‑Marconi
- Songwriters: Eddy Marnay; Jean-Pierre Goussaud
- Producers: Eddy Marnay; Rudi Pascal

Celine Dion singles chronology
"Une colombe" (1984)	"Mon rêve de toujours" (1984)	"Un amour pour moi" (1985)

Audio
- "Mon rêve de toujours" on YouTube

"Mon rêve de toujours" (lit. 'My Everlasting Dream') is the second single from Celine Dion's album Mélanie. It was issued in September 1984 in Quebec, Canada, and also released in France. The song entered the Quebec Singles Chart on 22 September 1984, reaching number four and remaining on the chart for 21 weeks. It was also issued in France to promote Dion's second album released there, Les oiseaux du bonheur. The track later appeared on the compilation Les premières années.

== Formats and track listing ==
- Canadian 7-inch single
1. "Mon rêve de toujours" – 4:17
2. "Chante-moi" – 3:21
- French 7-inch single
1. "Mon rêve de toujours" – 4:20
2. "Les oiseaux du bonheur" – 3:40

== Charts ==
Chart performance
Chart (1984)	Peak position
Quebec (ADISQ)	4
