= Diane Juster =

Canadian singer-songwriter and composer

Diane Juster, née Rivet (born March 15, 1946) is a Canadian singer-songwriter and composer from Montreal, Quebec. Although she had some success as a performer in her own right, she has been most prominent as a songwriter for other artists, including Julie Arel, Ginette Reno, Robert Charlebois, Johanne Blouin and Céline Dion.

After studying piano at the Université de Montréal, she began writing songs in 1971. After Arel recorded several of her songs, Juster began performing as an artist herself, and represented Canada at the Festival international de la chanson française in 1975. Although she released a number of albums and popular singles as a performer, however, she found that she was more passionate about writing for other artists than she was about performing, and concentrated principally on songwriting after the 1970s. Her song "Je ne suis qu'une chanson", written for Reno, won the Félix Award for Song of the Year in 1980. She also composed music for films, including Chocolate Eclair (Éclair au chocolat) and The Morning Man (Un matin, une vie).

She was named a Member of the Order of Canada in 2016, and in 2023 she was named a Knight of the National Order of Quebec. In 2024 she was named as a recipient of the Governor General's Performing Arts Awards.

== Discography ==
- 1974 - Mélancolie
- 1975 - M'aimeras-tu demain
- 1976 - Mes plus belles chansons
- 1977 - Regarde en moi
- 1981 - Tu as laissé passer l'amour
- 1984 - Rien qu'amoureuse
- 1987 - J'ai besoin de parler
- 1993 - Diane Juster
- 2002 - Je suis venue vous dire...
- 2004 - Ma musique et mes chansons
