= Paul Baillargeon =

Canadian composer

Paul Baillargeon (born 1943) is a Canadian composer, known for his music for television shows. He contributed music to 41 episodes of Star Trek shows, and won the 2002 ASCAP Award (Top TV Series) for Enterprise, shared with the series' other regular composers.

== Early life ==
Baillargeon was born in Montreal, Quebec.

== Career ==
Baillargeon began creating arrangements for the group Les Baronets in the 1960s. He released three albums, including Viens, Mon Amour in 1970 and 1971's Soleil with Jean-Pierre Ferland. He arranged orchestrations for and directed Celine Dion's orchestra during her first tour, and composed her song "Une colombe".

Baillargeon composed music for television shows in Quebec, and in 1989 he and Ferland created a musical, Gala, about the artist Salvador Dalí and his wife.

Baillargeon began composing music for the television series Star Trek: Deep Space Nine, and later Star Trek: Enterprise and Star Trek: Voyager.

In 2007, Baillargeon was the recipient of the Lifetime Achievement Award at the Francophone SOCAN Awards held in Montreal.
