= Marcel Lefebvre (screenwriter) =

Canadian screenwriter and composer (1941–2022)

- Born: 26 October 1941; Quebec City, Quebec, Canada
- Died: 26 November 2022 (aged 81)
- Education: Externat classique de Longueuil; Université de Montréal
- Occupation(s): Screenwriter; Composer

Marcel Lefebvre (26 October 1941 – 26 November 2022) was a Canadian screenwriter, composer, author, and artist. In 2007, he was awarded the Prix Luc Plamondon for his work as a lyricist.

== Biography ==
In his 50-year career, Lefebvre entered into many different fields of the arts, such as teaching, philosophy, music, painting, and writing for the stage and for film. He was known for writing songs for the likes of Jean Lapointe, Diane Dufresne, Ginette Reno, Renée Martel, Renée Claude, Donald Lautrec, Pierre Lalonde, Roch Voisine, Martin Deschamps, and others. He also wrote songs for advertising agencies, which appeared in the ads of many well-known corporations.

Lefebvre died on 26 November 2022, at the age of 81.

== Awards ==
- Honorable mention for the Prix Gémeaux (1991)
- Classiques de la Socan (1995, 2012, 2013)
- Prix Luc Plamondon (2007)

== Screenplays ==
- Un enfant comme les autres... (1972)
- The Rebels (1972)
- There's Always a Way to Find a Way (1973)
- Mustang (1975)

== Books ==
- Les Amants de 1837 (2011)
- La Rebelle et le Yankee (2013)
