= Daniel Hétu =

Canadian pianist and conductor

- Born: December 1, 1950; Montreal, Quebec, Canada
- Died: January 8, 2008 (aged 57); Montreal, Quebec, Canada
- Occupations: Pianist, Organist, Orchestra conductor, Arranger, Singer-songwriter, Composer
- Father: Lucien Hétu
- Website: http://www.danielhetu.com/

Daniel Hétu (1 December 1950 – 8 January 2008) was a Canadian pianist, organist, orchestra conductor, arranger, singer-songwriter and composer from Quebec.

== Biography ==
Daniel Hétu was born on 1 December 1950 in Montreal, Quebec, Canada to Lucien Hétu.

Hétu started studying piano at age 4 with André Mathieu. He won the Grand Prix du disque canadien (children's section) of CKAC for his first single "La parade des soldats de bois", an organ arrangement. He studied at the École de musique Vincent-d'Indy between 1967 and 1971. He also studied orchestration and arranging with Neil Chotem for three years.

With his father Lucien, Daniel gave recitals at the Comédie-Canadienne, at the Place des Arts and touring across Canada in 1968 and 1969. In 1971, he distinguished himself at the Yamaha International Organ Competition in Nemuno Sato, Japan, earning second place by a tie. He was arranger and orchestra conductor for René Simard and Ginette Reno in 1972 and 1977 respectively. He also worked in this capacity for some of his father's recordings for artists such as Édith Butler, Renée Claude, Nicole Cloutier, Patsy Gallant, Aimé Major, and Renée Martel. He was orchestra conductor for Charles Azvanour, Gilbert Bécaud and Mireille Mathieu.

Daniel Hétu was music director of the television shows Les Coqueluches (1976), Faut voir ça (1978) and Les tannants (1978–1981). He was orchestra conductor of Michel Jasmin(1983) and L'arti-show. He published the song "Je t'attendais" in 1979, which was very successful and earned a SOCAN Classics Award in 1999. It was followed by a first album of his compositions.

In the early 1980s, Daniel Hétu set up the recording studio Marilyn.

Hétu became sick in December 2007. He died on 8 January 2008 in Montreal.

== Discography ==
Singles
Year	Title
1962	La parade des soldats de bois / La marche des oursons
1974	Flip Flop Fly / Flip Flop Fly
1974	T’as donc des beaux bip-bops / T’as donc des beaux bip-bops
1977	Mammy blue
1979	Je t’attendais / Partir au soleil
1979	Piano Motion / Je cherche une fille
1980	Je suis revenu / Je m’ennuie de toi
1982	Et je rêve
1983	Ma vie / Souris-moi
1983	L’amour, toujours l’amour / Amoureux de tes yeux
1988	Ne t’en va pas
1989	Le coeur en quarantaine

Albums
Year	Title
1968	Lucien Hétu et son fils Daniel
1972	Daniel Hétu joue les grands succès de Roger Whittaker
1979	Je t’attendais
1980	Daniel Hétu
1982	Et je rêve
1983	Ma vie
1988	Daniel Hétu
