= Thérèse Dion =

Canadian television personality (1927–2020)

Thérèse Dion MSM
- Dion c. 2006
- Born: Thérèse Tanguay; 20 March 1927; Sainte-Anne-des-Monts, Quebec, Canada
- Died: 17 January 2020 (aged 92); Laval, Quebec, Canada
- Other name: Maman Dion
- Occupations: Television personality; songwriter
- Spouse: Adhémar-Charles Dion (m. 1945; died 2003)
- Children: 14, including Céline Dion

Thérèse Tanguay-Dion (née Tanguay; 20 March 1927 – 17 January 2020), popularly known as "Maman Dion" (French for 'Mommy Dion'), was a Canadian television personality and the mother of singer Celine Dion.

== Life ==
Born on the Gaspé Peninsula in Sainte-Anne-des-Monts, Quebec (as was her husband, Adhémar-Charles Dion), her parents were Antoinette (née Sergerie) and Laureat Achille Tanguay.

Already well known in Quebec as a stage mother involved in her daughter's career, she later launched her own line of food products, *Pâtés de Maman Dion*, and became host of a cooking show for TVA in 1999. She was also a sponsor of the Fondation Maman Dion, founded in 2006, an educational foundation providing school supplies, clothing, and eyewear to underprivileged children.

=== Children ===
Thérèse and Adhémar had 14 children:

- Denise Dion (born 16 August 1946)
- Clément Dion (born 2 November 1947)
- Claudette Dion (born 10 December 1948)
- Liette Dion (born 8 February 1950)
- Michel Dion (born 18 August 1952)
- Louise Dion (born 22 September 1953)
- Jacques Dion (born 10 March 1955)
- Daniel Dion (29 November 1956 – 16 January 2016)
- Ghislaine Dion (born 28 July 1958)
- Linda Dion (born 23 June 1959)
- Manon Dion (born 7 October 1960)
- Paul Dion (born 3 April 1962)
- Pauline Dion (born 3 April 1962)
- Celine Dion (born 30 March 1968)

== Death ==
After several months of health issues, Thérèse Tanguay-Dion died at her home in the Saint-Rose neighbourhood of Laval on 17 January 2020, at the age of 92.
