= Pierre David (film producer) =

Canadian film producer

Pierre David (born May 17, 1944) is a Canadian film producer and film financier.

== Biography ==
David is best known for executive-producing iconic films directed by David Cronenberg, such as Scanners, Videodrome, and The Brood. He is also credited as "production executive" on the Academy Award-winning film Platoon, directed by Oliver Stone. He has since produced dozens of independent films, mainly in the thriller genre, and is still actively producing. He is the brother of former Quebec solidaire MNA Françoise David, as well as current Liberal MNA Hélène David.

In 1987, Pierre David Enterprises was the founding partners, along with home video distributor Malofilm, animation studio Nelvana and another home video distributor, New Star Entertainment, to form Los Angeles–based firm Image Organization, which was specialized in the thriller genre, and by 1996, represents 100 films in the international market, which by the beginning of the Image Organization combined group, represents foreign sales of the productions from the four companies each, and Pierre David hold a 20% interest, along with Nelvana and Malofilm, which also hold a 20% share, with a majority of 40% controlled by New Star Entertainment, which was led by partners Dmitri Villard and Robby Wald. Both Nelvana and New Star would later sell its shares in Image to David and Malofilm in 1989. Malo also formed in partnership with Pierre David, a company Lance Entertainment to develop films among the strongest French-indie track distributors in Canada.
