= The Black Sheep (1992 film) =

- French: Le Mouton noir
- Directed by: Jacques Godbout
- Produced by: Éric Michel
- Starring: Jacques Godbout
- Cinematography: Jean-Pierre Lachapelle
- Edited by: Monique Fortier
- Production company: National Film Board of Canada
- Release date: 1992
- Country: Canada
- Language: French

The Black Sheep (French: Le Mouton noir) is a Quebec documentary produced in 1992 by the National Film Board of Canada (NFB). Jacques Godbout directed and starred in the film. Its style belongs to the Quebec cinéma vérité school of filmmaking.

== Synopsis ==
It chronicles the immediate aftermath of the fall, in 1990, of the Meech Lake Accord, and its effects on the Quebec society and Quebec nationalism. It is set during the Bélanger-Campeau commission (a public hearing to determine the way to choose for Quebec regarding its autonomy), before the Parti Libéral du Québec (in power, traditionally in favor of autonomy within Canada and co-initiator of the Accord with the Progressive Conservative Party of Canada) formally closed the door to independence in the light of the death of Meech Lake and the departure of some Liberal nationalists to create the ADQ. The title means The Black Sheep, referring to Quebec and its difference coupled with a perceived ostracism by Canada, notably through its rejection of the Accord that would have recognized this difference.

== Protagonists ==
The film is focused not only on the reaction of the Quebec people as a whole but also on individuals and their experiences right in the middle of the Meech Lake aftermath. The main protagonists are five young politicians later to leave their mark on Quebec society: Michel Bissonnette, Denis Coderre, Mario Dumont, Joseph Facal, and Jean-François Simard. Their destinies are all altered and shaped by the historical event (for example: Simard becomes a sovereigntist and will leave the Liberal Party for the Parti Québécois; Dumont will also slam the Liberal door to later help create and finally become leader of the Action démocratique du Québec, or ADQ, and support the Yes side of the 1995 referendum on independence).

It also features many other Quebec public figures, notably political scientist Daniel Latouche (a past senior adviser to René Lévesque), then Premier Robert Bourassa, sovereigntist and aspirant to Bourassa's "throne" Jacques Parizeau, and fellow filmmaker Denys Arcand. Bourassa speaks of the Accord, his related famous speech in the National Assembly of Quebec and the cancer that would soon bring him to his demise. Arcand gives his point of view on the similarities between the moment in question and another important event in Quebec nationalism and independentism, the 1980 referendum. The fall of the Accord indeed led to the second referendum on independence. He is himself the director of Le confort et l'indifférence, a similar analytic film about the 1980 plebiscite, and is brought into Le Mouton Noir especially for that reason.

== Production ==
Like other documentaries of his (Traître ou Patriote, for example), Le Mouton noir showcases Godbout's own style of putting himself into the narrative thread by setting up scenes where he researches his subject and interacts with others, to help push the documentary forward. Godbout provides his own voice for the voice-overs of the English version.

== Sequel ==
In 2003, a sequel was brought to theaters called Les héritiers du mouton noir. It catches up with the five young politicians the first part centred on.

== See also ==
- List of Quebec movies
- List of Quebec film directors
- Cinema of Quebec
- Culture of Quebec
- History of Quebec
- Politics of Quebec
