= Luc Cousineau =

Canadian singer-songwriter, composer and producer

- Born: September 19, 1944; Montreal, Quebec, Canada
- Died: March 6, 2017 (aged 72); Estrie, Quebec, Canada
- Occupations: Singer-songwriter, Composer, Producer
- Relatives: François Cousineau (brother); Jean Cousineau (brother)

Luc Cousineau (19 September 1944 – 6 March 2017) was a Canadian singer-songwriter, composer and producer from Quebec.

== Biography ==
Luc Cousineau was born on 19 September 1944 in Montreal, Quebec, Canada. He was brother to François Cousineau and Jean Cousineau. He studied the cello in Sherbrooke, and then the saxophone with Arthur Romano and the double-bass with Roland Desjardins at the école de musique Vincent-d'Indy. There, he met the singer Lise Vachon, whom he would later marry.

He was an accompanist for artists like Stéphane Venne, Isabelle Pierre and Renée Claude. He then formed the singing duo Les Alexandrins with Lise Vachon, accompanied by Cousineau on the guitar. They made their debut in 1965. It was successful, and was dissolved in 1973. After 1973, Luc Cousineau pursued a career as a composer, focusing on audiovisual productions and commercials. His popularity grew as he published LPs such as Cousineau (1973) and Comme tout le monde (1981).

In 1975, Cousineau founded the record company Airedale. In 1978, he founded Les Productions Luc Cousineau, and in 1986, Les Auditifs (1986).

In 2000, he made a comeback with the disc J'laisse aller, followed by Jusqu'à ton monde in 2001.

In 2013, Luc Cousineau was diagnosed with amyotrophic lateral sclerosis (ALS), a degenerative incurable disease. He published the album Tant qu'il y aura une chanson in 2015, and parts of the profits from disc sales went to research on ALS. He died on 6 March 2017 in Estrie.

By his death, he had composed over 200 songs over 50 years. He had at least two children.

== Discography ==
Singles
| Year | Title |
|---|---|
| 1974 | Quand tu fais soleil/J’suis rendu loin |
| 1976 | T’as beau pas être beau/Ôte-moi tes jupons mon amour |
| 1976 | Vivreenamour/Marie-Madeleine |
| 1976 | Valse de la Baie James/Valse de la Baie James |
| 1977 | Ton Roméo |
| 1977 | On roule les trottoirs/J’faime sans bon sens |
| 1977 | Madame la vie/Viens-tu |
| 1978 | Amoureux de toi/Encore un peu d’amour |
| 1981 | Comme tout le monde/Reste à la saison |
| 1981 | Si les mots me venaient |
| 1982 | Les enfants nous apprennent à vivre/J’me sens bien |
| 1982 | On court tous après la vérité/T’es beau quand tu ris |
| 1983 | Il ne faut pas qu’on touche au monde/Instrumental |
| 1987 | Mais voilà/instrumental |
| 1988 | Passe à Go/Instrumental |
| 1989 | Parfois des jours/instrumental |

Albums
| Year | Title |
|---|---|
| 1973 | Cousineau |
| 1975 | Luc Cousineau |
| 1976 | Schlack! |
| 1979 | Luc Cousineau |
| 1980 | Comme tout l’nwnde |
| 1982 | Comme ça vient |
| 1989 | Connivence |
| 2000 | J'laisse aller |
| 2001 | Jusqu'à ton monde |
| 2015 | Tant qu'il y aura une chanson |
