= François Cousineau =

Canadian singer-songwriter, arranger and conductor

François Cousineau CQ
- Born: May 10, 1942 (age 84); Montreal, Quebec, Canada
- Occupations: Pianist, Composer, Arranger, Orchestra conductor
- Relatives: Luc Cousineau (brother); Jean Cousineau (brother)
- Website: https://www.francoiscousineau.com/

François Cousineau (b. 10 May 1942) is a Canadian pianist, composer, arranger and orchestra conductor from Quebec.

== Biography ==
François Cousineau was born in Montreal, Quebec, Canada on 10 May 1942. He is the brother of Luc Cousineau and Jean Cousineau. Cousineau started studying piano at 5 years old and obtained a baccalaureate in music at the école de musique Vincent-d'Indy in 1961.

In the early 1960s, Cousineau formed a jazz trio that performed in dance events and was an accompanist for chansonniers such as Jacques Blanchet, Georges Dor and Claude Gauthier. He composed his first song, "La robe de soie" , for Clémence Desrochers. He then composed songs for other chansonniers. He also studied law in the early 1960s, his studies being financed by his work in music. He passed the bar in 1966.

Soon after, Cousineau started working with Pauline Julien, becoming her accompanist for seven years. He also composed for her. From 1972 to 1977, he worked closely with Luc Plamondon, composed around fifty of Diane Dufresne's songs and was responsible for the musical direction of the latter's shows. In 1980, he participated in the TV special Cousineau-Rivard with Michel Rivard. In 1982, he was responsible for the musical direction for Claude Dubois's show at the Montreal Forum.

In 1972, Cousineau became one of the owners of the recording studio Tempo in Montreal.

He became a founding member of the Société professionnelle des auteurs et des compositeurs du Québec in 1981 and founding president of the Société du droit de reproduction des auteurs, compositeurs et éditeurs au Canada in 1985.

In 1990, Cousineau became the president of the executive council of the SOCAN. He was SOCAN's president from 1994 to 1996.

Cousineau's first solo album François Cousineau (1999) obtained the Félix Award in 2000 in the category "Instrumental album of the year".

In 2005, the Société professionnelle des auteurs et des compositeurs du Québec created the François Cousineau Award to honor the career of notable Quebec songwriters.

He became a knight of the National Order of Quebec in 2011.

In total, Cousineau wrote over 200 songs for artists such as Robert Charlebois, Renée Claude, Céline Dion, Louise Forestier, Daniel Lavoie, Pierre Létourneau, Danielle Oderra, Ginette Reno, Martine St-Clair and Fabienne Thibeault. He wrote over 2000 arrangements and orchestrations. He also wrote music for theater plays and commercials. He was responsible for the musical direction of multiple TV shows.

== Style ==
Cousineau is a versatile composer. He has an extended knowledge of musical vocabulary and can switch from jazz to boogie, from classic to contemporary.

== Awards and honours ==
- 1970 – Gala Méritas – Best Musical Theme in a Canadian Film for L’initiation
- 1994 – SOCAN Awards – SOCAN Classics Award for Pars pas sans m’dire bye bye
- 1994 – SOCAN Awards – SOCAN Classics Award for J’ai rencontré l’homme de ma vie
- 1994 – SOCAN Awards – SOCAN Classics Award for En écoutant Elton John
- 1995 – SOCAN Awards – SOCAN Classics Award for Les hauts et les bas d’une hôtesse de l’air
- 1995 – SOCAN Awards – SOCAN Classics Award for Chanson pour Elvis
- 1995 – SOCAN Awards – SOCAN Classics Award for Partir pour Acapulco
- 1999 – SOCAN Awards – SOCAN Classics Award for Sur la même longueur d’ondes
- 2000 – Félix Awards – Instrumental Album of the Year for François Cousineau
- 2003 – SOCAN Awards – National Francophone Award for Lifetime Achievement
- 2003 – SOCAN Awards – SOCAN Classics Award for Conversation téléphonique
- 2009 – SPACQ – André-Gagnon Award for Lifetime Achievement
- 2010 – SOCAN Awards – SOCAN Classics Award for T’es belle (co-written with Jean-Pierre Ferland)
- 2011 – National Order of Québec – Knight
- 2012 – SOCAN Awards – SOCAN Classics Award for Un jour il viendra mon amour

== Discography ==
Singles
Year	Title
1965	Les beaux dimanches/Tout un jour/Blues pour Angéline
1969	Pauvre amour/Le sursis de San Remo
1970	Un jour il viendra mon amour/Un jour il viendra mon amour
1970	Une fleur sur la neige/Une fleur sur la neige
1970	Thème pour Julien/La machine à faire l’amour
1971	Sept fois par jour/Ram Da Doo Di Dah

Albums
Year	Title
1965	La corde au cou
1970	L’initiation
1972	Les plus célèbres musiques de films du Québec de François Cousineau
1999	François Cousineau

== Filmography ==
Musical scores
Year	Title
1963	À tout prendre
1964	Pour la suite du monde
1965	La corde au cou
1969	L’initiation
1970	L’amour humain
1971	Sept fois par jour
1972	Quelques arpents de neige
