= Traitor or Patriot =

- Traître ou patriote
- Directed by: Jacques Godbout
- Starring: Jacques Godbout
- Production company: National Film Board of Canada
- Release date: 2000
- Country: Canada
- Language: French

Traitor or Patriot (French: Traître ou patriote) is a Quebec documentary produced by the National Film Board of Canada (NFB) in 2000. It is directed by and starring Jacques Godbout. Its style belongs to the Quebec cinéma direct school of filmmaking.

== Synopsis ==
It analyzes the place of Quebec Premier Adélard Godbout in history. Godbout is not well-considered by Quebec historians and citizens. Adérald Godbout was the Second World War–era Quebec head of government, and the great-uncle of the director. Godbout advances some theories to explain why his great-uncle was forgotten in the collective memory of the Quebecers. One theory is that Adélard Godbout was more favourable than other political leaders to conscription. Quebec nationalists, at the time, opposed conscription, which they saw as a British imperialist manoeuvre of English Canada to defend the Empire.

== Production ==
Like other documentaries of his (The Black Sheep, for example), Traître ou Patriote showcases Jacques Godbout's own style of putting himself into the narrative thread: he sets up scenes where he researches his subject and interacts with others, to help push the documentary forward. One example of this is when he is filmed asking historians at a reception if they can recognize the picture of Godbout, the politician, which they cannot. Jacques Godbout provides his own voice for the voice-overs of the English version.

== See also ==
- List of Quebec movies
- List of Quebec film directors
- Cinema of Quebec
- Culture of Quebec
- History of Quebec
- Politics of Quebec
