= Stéphane Venne =

Canadian songwriter and composer (1941–2025)

- Born: 2 July 1941; Verdun, Quebec, Canada
- Died: 17 January 2025 (aged 83) Saint-Hyacinthe, Quebec, Canada
- Occupations: Singer-songwriter, arranger, record producer
- Label: Barclay

Stéphane Venne (2 July 1941 – 17 January 2025) was a Canadian singer-songwriter, arranger and record producer. He also worked as head of production for the Canadian arm of Barclay Records, as a radio station executive, and as a composer of film scores.

== Life and career ==
As a student at the Université de Montréal in the 1960s, he was codirector with Denys Arcand and Denis Héroux of the film Alone or With Others (Seul ou avec d'autres), for which he also composed music. He began his songwriting career in the same era, both writing for other artists and recording his own albums as a singer-songwriter, breaking through to popular success when his song "Un jour, un jour" was selected as the official theme song for Expo 67.

As a songwriter he was known particularly for songs performed by artists such as Emmanuëlle, Pierre Lalonde, Renée Claude, Suzanne Stevens and Marie-Élaine Thibert.

In film he was most noted for his work on The Plouffe Family (Les Plouffe), for which he won the Genie Awards for both Best Original Song and Best Original Score at the 3rd Genie Awards in 1982.

In 2011, Venne was the recipient of the Lifetime Achievement Award at the Francophone SOCAN Awards held in Montreal.

In 2016, Venne won the Cultural Impact Award for the song "Le début d'un temps nouveau" at the Francophone SOCAN Awards in Montreal. In 2017, he was inducted into the Canadian Songwriters Hall of Fame. In 2019 the song "Tu trouveras la paix" (You Will Find Peace), one of Venne's compositions for Renée Claude, was re-recorded as a charitable supergroup single by Céline Dion, Ginette Reno, Diane Dufresne, Isabelle Boulay, Luce Dufault, Louise Forestier, Laurence Jalbert, Catherine Major, Ariane Moffatt, Marie Denise Pelletier, and Marie-Élaine Thibert, after Claude's diagnosis with Alzheimer's disease was announced.

Venne died on 17 January 2025, in Saint-Hyacinthe, Quebec, at the age of 83, after opting for medical assistance in dying due to an illness he had been battling for several weeks.

== Discography as singer-songwriter ==
- 1964: Stéphane Venne Volume 1 (Disques Sélect)
- 1966: Stéphane Venne Volume 2 (Disques Sélect)
- 1967: Un jour, un jour (Disques Sélect)
- 1973: Stéphane Venne en 10 chansons orchestrales (Barclay)
- 1975: Tranquillement Stéphane Venne (Les Disques Solset)
- 1982: Stéphane Venne (Disques Pro-Culture)
- 1998: Le temps est bon (Compilation) (Disques Citation)

== Discography as songwriter for other artists ==
- 1965: Renée Claude - Il y eut un jour (Disques Sélect)
- 1968: Renée Claude - Renée Claude (C'est notre fête aujourd'hui) (Barclay)
- 1969: Donald Lautrec - un jour, un jour / Ces temps de jeunesse (select)
- 1969: Renée Claude - Le tour de la terre (Barclay)
- 1970: Renée Claude - Le début d'un temps nouveau (Barclay)
- 1971: Renée Claude - Tu trouveras la paix (Barclay)
- 1971: Pierre Lalonde - Inouik (Disques Capitol)
- 1971: Isabelle Pierre - Heureuse (Barclay)
- 1972: Isabelle Pierre - Le temps est bon (Barclay)
- 1973: Isabelle Pierre - Ballade pour Sergio Leone (Barclay)
- 1973: Perre Lalonde - A winnipeg les nuits sont longues
- 1973: Pierre Lalonde - Honey, honey (Disques Victor)
- 1973: Emmanuëlle - Le monde à l'envers (Les Disques Solset)
- 1974: Emmanuëlle - Chanter pour vivre (Les Disques Solset)
- 1975: Emmanuëlle - Pas tout de suite, pas maintenant (Les Disques Solset)
- 1976: Emmanuëlle - La double compilation (Les Disques Solset)
- 1976: Suzanne Stevens - Moi, de la tête aux pieds (Capitol)
- 1978: Emmanuëlle - Je vous aime (Disques Solo)
- 1979: Renée Claude - Bonjour (Les Disques Solset)
- 1979: Suzanne Stevens - Les nuits sont trop longues (Capitol)
- 1981: Nicole Martin et l'Orchestre Montréal-Pop - "Les Plouffe", trame du film de Gilles Carle (Disques Pro-Culture)
- 1989: Nicole Martin - 20 ans d'amour, 20 chansons (Les Disques Diva)
- 1993: Emmanuëlle - Rétrospective (Disques Mérite)
- 1997: Pierre Lalonde - Succès de jeunesse (Disques Mérite)
- 1997: Isabelle Pierre - Les refrains d'abord (Fonovox)
- 1997: Isabelle Pierre - Collection Portrait (Fonovox)
- 1998: Renée Claude - C'était le début d'un temps nouveau (Disques Transit)
- 1973: Emmanuëlle - Et c'est pas fini (Disques Mérite)
- 2001: Nicole Martin - Mes grands succès Vol. 1 (Les Disques Diva)
- 2003: Star Académie 2003 - Et c'est pas fini (Disques Musicor)
- 2004: Marie-Élaine Thibert - Marie-Élaine Thibert (Disques Musicor)
- 2004: Isabelle Pierre - Compilation (Disques XXI-21)

== Filmography ==
- 1962: Alone or With Others (Seul ou avec d'autres)
- 1964: The Earth to Drink (La terre à boire)
- 1964: Over My Head (Jusqu'au cou)
- 1964: The End of Summer (Le temps perdu)
- 1966: YUL 871
- 1967: 9 Minutes
- 1967: Jeux de Québec 1967
- 1969: Where Are You Then? (Où êtes-vous donc?)
- 1971: Heads or Tails (Pile ou face)
- 1971: The Men (Les Mâles)
- 1981: The Plouffe Family (Les Plouffe)
- 2004: C'est ma Floride!
