= Guilbeault =

Guilbeault is a surname of French origin derived from the German name Willibald. It is mostly used among French Canadians while it is quite rare in France.

- Luce Guilbeault (1935–1991), Canadian actress
- Steven Guilbeault (born 1970), Canadian environment minister
