= List of Quebec film directors =

This is a list of film directors from the Canadian province of Quebec. Most, although not all, work specifically within the context of Quebec cinema, which operates semi-autonomously from the film industry of English Canada.

== A ==
- Denys Arcand
- Louise Archambault

== B ==
- Frédéric Back
- Paule Baillargeon
- Sarah Baril Gaudet
- Jean Beaudin
- Louis Bélanger
- Dan Bigras
- Jean-Yves Bigras
- Charles Binamé
- François Bouvier
- André Brassard
- Michel Brault
- Manon Briand

== C ==
- Jean-François Caissy
- Érik Canuel
- Gilles Carle
- Marcel Carrière
- Jean Chabot
- Danic Champoux
- Patricia Chica
- Denis Chouinard
- Denis Côté
- Michèle Cournoyer
- Paul Cowan
- Chloé Cinq-Mars

== D ==
- Fernand Dansereau
- Mireille Dansereau
- Patrick Demers
- Rock Demers
- Sophie Deraspe
- Denys Desjardins
- Alain Deslongchamps
- Luc Dionne
- Xavier Dolan
- Jacques Drouin
- Georges Dufaux
- Christian Duguay
- Gaëlle d'Ynglemare

== E ==
- Guy Édoin
- Anne Émond
- Bernard Émond

== F ==
- Philippe Falardeau
- Pierre Falardeau
- Robert Favreau
- Denise Filiatrault
- André Forcier
- Claude Fournier
- Yves Christian Fournier

== G ==
- Claude Gagnon
- Gratien Gélinas
- François Girard
- Maxime Giroux
- Jacques Godbout
- Bernard Gosselin
- David Gow
- Daniel Grou
- Gilles Groulx

== H ==
- Patricio Henríquez
- Denis Héroux
- Christopher Hinton

== J ==
- Rodrigue Jean
- Michel Jetté
- René Jodoin
- Marie-Ève Juste
- Claude Jutra
- Benoît Jutras

== K ==
- Elza Kephart

== L ==
- Jean-Claude Labrecque
- Stéphane Lafleur
- Arthur Lamothe
- Micheline Lanctôt
- Christian Langlois
- Michel Langlois
- Stéphane Lapointe
- Jean-Claude Lauzon
- Simon Lavoie
- Caroline Leaf
- Francis Leclerc
- Jacques Leduc
- Jean Pierre Lefebvre
- Guy A. Lepage
- Robert Lepage
- Maurice Leroux
- Philippe Lesage
- Arthur Lipsett
- Jean-Claude Lord
- Colin Low

== M ==
- Francis Mankiewicz
- Jo Martin
- Korbett Matthews
- Norman McLaren
- Mark Morgenstern
- Stéphanie Morgenstern
- Robert Morin
- George Mihalka

== N ==
- Kim Nguyen

== O ==
- Alanis Obomsawin

== P ==
- Pierre Patry
- Yvan Patry
- Gabriel Pelletier
- Yves P. Pelletier
- Pierre Perrault
- Aleksandr Petrov
- Luc Picard
- Benoit Pilon
- Sébastien Pilote
- Anne Claire Poirier
- Léa Pool
- Michel Poulette
- Jean-François Pouliot
- Raymonde Provencher

== R ==
- Tahani Rached
- Mort Ransen
- Jason Reitman
- Daniel Roby
- Sébastien Rose

== S ==
- Cynthia Scott
- Ken Scott
- Mack Sennett
- Beverly Shaffer
- Bashar Shbib
- Yves Simoneau

== T ==
- Albert Tessier
- Kevin Tierney
- Ziad Touma
- Ricardo Trogi
- André Turpin

== V ==
- Jean-Marc Vallée
- Denis Villeneuve

== W ==
- Frederick Wallace
- Mariloup Wolfe

== See also ==
- List of Canadian directors
- Cinema of Quebec
- Culture of Quebec
