= Luce Guilbeault =

Canadian actress and director

- Born: 5 March 1935; Outremont, Quebec, Canada
- Died: 12 July 1991 (aged 56); Montreal, Quebec
- Occupations: Actress, director
- Years active: 1958–1990
- Notable work: Françoise Durocher, Waitress; La Maudite Galette; Réjeanne Padovani; Les Beaux Dimanches; Mourir à tue-tête
- Television: Le Temps d'une paix; Des dames de cœur; Un signe de feu

Luce Guilbeault (5 March 1935 – 12 July 1991) was a Canadian actress and director from Quebec. She was one of the leading figures of Quebec repertory theatre of the 1960s and one of the most-sought actresses of Quebec cinema in the 1970s. She received a Canadian Film Award in 1975 and the first Prix Iris from the National Film Board of Canada in 1991 for her life's work.

== Biography ==
Raised in Montreal as a doctor's daughter, Luce Guilbeault was introduced to the arts at an early age, particularly in music and theatre. She studied for five years with William Graves at the National Film Board of Canada (NFB), using the Stanislawski method, then studied for a few years at the Actors Studio in New York.

Guilbeault's career began in the theatre, where she excelled in the Quebec repertoire (e.g.: Réjean Ducharme, Michel Tremblay). She is most remembered for her career in the cinema, with some 20 films to her credit. Her first major film role was that of a disillusioned wife in Denys Arcand's La Maudite Galette (1972) followed by Réjeanne Padovani (1973). She played in O.K. ... Laliberté (1973) by Marcel Carrière, Tendresse ordinaire (1973) by Jacques Leduc and in the films of Anne Claire Poirier.

As a director, Guilbeault mainly created biographies of feminists, including actress Denise Benoît and a series of American feminists. She also directed the 1978 direct cinema film D'abord Ménagères which documented housework and the status of women in Quebec.

She was successful in the 1980s with the television soap operas Des dames de cœur and Un signe de feu.

Around 1990 Guilbeault wanted to write a booklet about the fate of aging actresses, composing an interview list of her contemporaries, "with nothing to lose ... and willing to confide." She found a publisher but was refused a grant from the Ministry of Culture. She died from cancer on 12 July 1991 and was entombed at the Notre Dame des Neiges Cemetery in Montreal.

== Legacy ==
From 1991 to 1998 Les Rendez-vous du cinéma québécois awarded the Prix Luce-Guilbeault to the best young promising actor or actress; winners included Luc Picard, Linda Roy and Patrick Huard.

In 2000 the feature-length biographical documentary Luce Guilbeault, explorActrice was produced by the NFB, directed by Marcel Jean.

In 2016 Ariel Borremans assembled the book Ma mère dans l'oeil de mon père which features photographs of his mother, Guilbault, taken by his father, Guy Borremans (1934–2012). The photographs are accompanied by texts from Quebec artists including Michel Tremblay, André Melançon, Réjean Ducharme, and Denys Arcand. Critic Antoine Aubert noted that, beyond the grace of the actress and the love of the photographer for his muse, it tells of an artistic history essential to the identity of Quebec.

== Filmography ==
- 1957-1959 – Opération-mystère (TV series)
- 1971 – Des souris et des hommes (mini-series)
- 1972 – Françoise Durocher, Waitress – l'une des Françoise Durocher
- 1972 – IXE-13 – Palma
- 1972 – Dirty Money (La Maudite galette) – Berthe
- 1972 – The Time of the Hunt (Le Temps d'une chasse) – La Rousse
- 1973 – Souris, tu m'inquiètes
- 1973 – La Dernière neige
- 1973 – O.K. ... Laliberté
- 1973 – Ordinary Tenderness (Tendresse ordinaire) – Luce
- 1973 – Le Grand Sabordage – Questa
- 1973 – Réjeanne Padovani – Réjeanne Padovani
- 1974 – Par une belle nuit d'hiver
- 1974 – Les Beaux Dimanches – Muriel
- 1975 – Y'a pas de problème (TV series) – Justine Demers
- 1975 – Mustang – Marie
- 1975 – Before the Time Comes (Le Temps de l'avant) – Hélène
- 1976 – Bargain Basement
- 1977 – J.A. Martin Photographer – Madame Beaupré
- 1978 – Passages
- 1978 – Angela – Marie Lebrecque
- 1979 – A Scream from Silence (Mourir à tue-tête) – a client
- 1980-1986 – Le Temps d'une paix (TV series) – Georgette Garon-Laflamme
- 1982 – Beyond Forty (French: La Quarantaine) – Hélène
- 1986 – Qui a tiré sur nos histoires d'amour – Lady
- 1986-1989 – Des dames de cœur (TV series) – Claire Trudel
- 1989-1991 – Un signe de feu (TV series) – Claire Trudel
- 1990 – The Night of the Visitor (La Nuit du visiteur)

== Awards ==
- In 1976 Guilbeault received a Canadian Film Award for Best Actress in a Non-Feature for Bargain Basement
- In 1991 Guilbeault received the first Prix Iris from the National Film Board of Canada for all of her work.
