= Ordinary Tenderness =

1973 Canadian film directed by Jacques Leduc

- French: Tendresse ordinaire
- Directed by: Jacques Leduc
- Written by: Robert Tremblay
- Produced by: Paul Larose
- Starring: Jocelyn Bérubé; Esther Auger; Luce Guilbeault
- Cinematography: Alain Dostie
- Edited by: Pierre Bernier
- Music by: Plume Latraverse; Jocelyn Bérubé
- Production company: National Film Board of Canada
- Release date: April 5, 1973
- Running time: 81 minutes
- Country: Canada
- Language: French

Ordinary Tenderness (French: Tendresse ordinaire) is a Canadian drama film, directed by Jacques Leduc and released in 1973. A meditation on the relationship between love and loneliness, the film stars Jocelyn Bérubé and Esther Auger as a husband and wife who have been apart for several months as he was away working in Schefferville; the film's narrative intercuts between his long drive home at the end of his work assignment, and her time at home impatiently waiting for his arrival.

The cast also includes Luce Guilbeault, Jean-Pierre Bourque, Claudette Delorimier, J.-Léo Gagnon, Plume Latraverse, Tiffany Lee, Jean-René Ouellet, Hélène Tremblay and Véronique Tremblay.

== Critical response ==
Vincent Canby of The New York Times wrote that "Like the early Andy Warhol, but less spectacularly so, Mr. Leduc is fascinated by the smallest, most common gestures, the drinking of a glass of beer or the maneuvering of a shopping cart through a supermarket. The gestures are not ends in themselves. They are the coded messages of lovers and friends. 'Ordinary Tenderness' is quite unlike any movie I've ever seen. I'm not sure it sustains its feature length. Yet it is a courageous attempt to create a narrative of the emotions tied only loosely to events. Conventional narrative cinema works just the other way around."
