= Pauline Lapointe =

Canadian actress/singer

Pauline Lapointe (May 12, 1950 - August 30, 2010) was a Canadian film and television actress and singer from Quebec. She was most noted for her performance in the 1993 film La Florida, for which she garnered a Genie Award nomination for Best Actress at the 14th Genie Awards.

The twin sister of actress Louise Portal, she was born in Chicoutimi, Quebec. She released two albums as a pop singer, Pauline Lapointe (1980) and Je dis oui (1983), before concentrating primarily on acting. Her other film roles included The Handyman (L'Homme à tout faire), Sonatine, The Alley Cat (Le Matou), Cruising Bar, The Ideal Man (L'Homme idéal) and It's Your Turn, Laura Cadieux (C'est à ton tour, Laura Cadieux), while her television roles included Watatatow, L'Obsession and Emma.

She died in 2010 of breast cancer.
