= Claude Jasmin =

Canadian journalist (1930–2021)

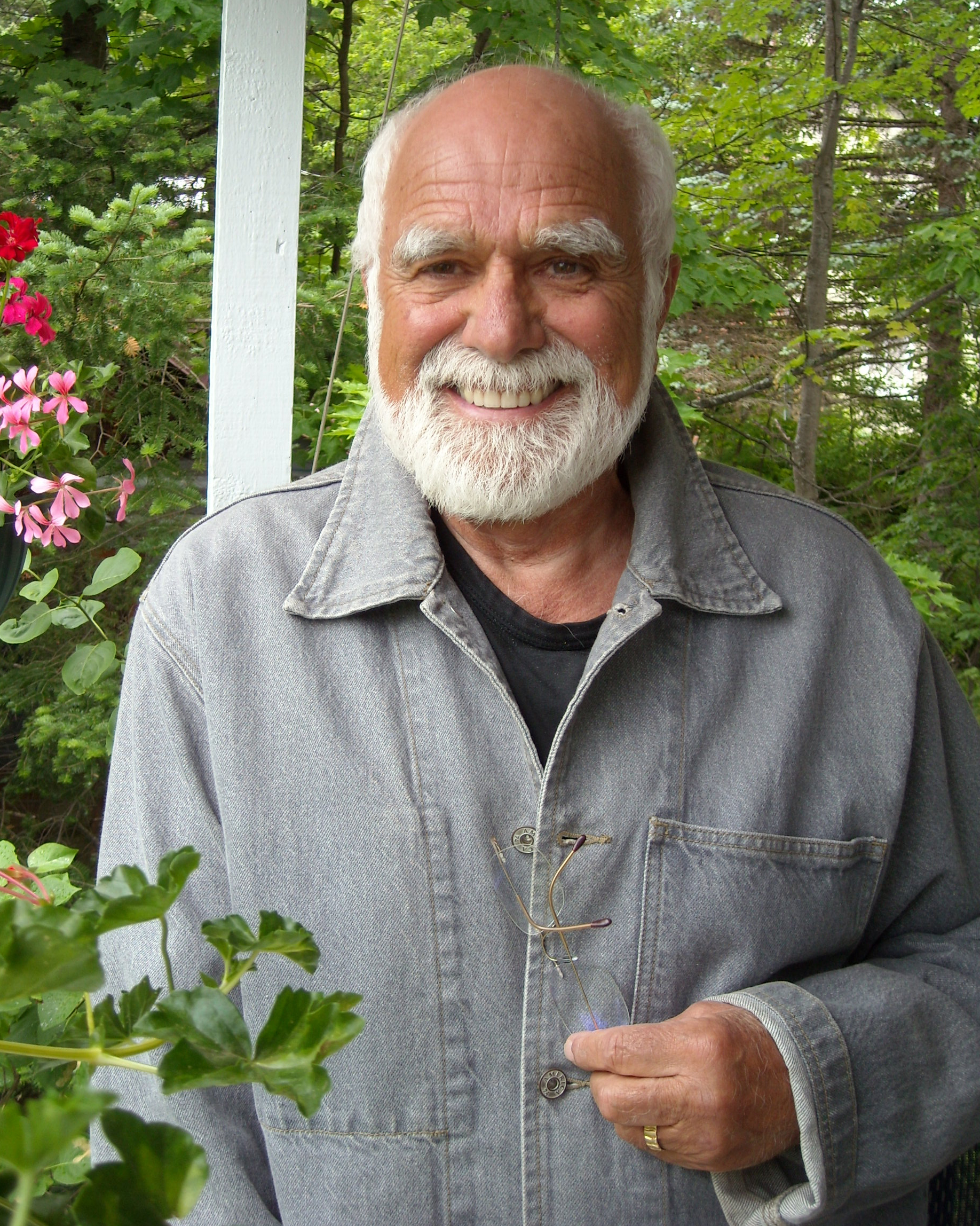
Claude Jasmin

Claude Jasmin (10 November 1930 – 28 April 2021) was a Canadian journalist, broadcaster, and writer from Quebec.

While very prolific, with almost 50 published titles to his credit, he is most famous for his 1972 novel La Petite Patrie, an autobiographical novel about growing up in a working-class neighbourhood of Montreal in the 1940s. The novel served as the basis for a very popular television series on Radio-Canada which ran for two seasons from 1974 to 1976, and was adapted in graphic novel form (by scriptwriter Julie Rocheleau and artist Normand Grégoire) in 2015. It is now considered a classic of Québécois literature, and the neighbourhood in which it is set has since been renamed "Rosemont-La Petite Patrie" in Jasmin's honour. He served as the screenwriter for the television adaptation of his novel, and later was the screenwriter for a number of other television series, many of which were based on his novels.

His start as a writer came as one of the pioneers of the crime novel genre in Quebec: his first novel, La corde au cou ("A rope around his neck", 1960) is about a remorseless killer, and he returned regularly to the genre over the years, including a series of novels featuring detective Charles Asselin in the 1980s. Several theatrical films were adapted from his novels, including Rope Around the Neck (La corde au cou) and Deliver Us from Evil (Délivrez-nous du mal).

In English Canada, his best-known novel is Ethel et le terroriste (1964), translated into English as Ethel and The Terrorist (1965), which won the Prix France-Québec in1965. Published at a time when terrorist bombings by Quebec separatists were in the headlines, it told the story of Paul, a naive member of an organization similar to the terrorist Front de Libération du Québec on the run from the police because of his involvement with a terrorist bombing that had inadvertently caused the death of a man, and of his love for Ethel, a concentration camp survivor. It addressed the conflict between his nationalist convictions and her revulsion at the devastation nationalism had caused to her family and people in Europe.

Jasmin is known for writing in joual, a Quebec dialect of the French language associated with working class French Canadians; his 1965 novel Pleure pas Germaine was written entirely in joual. It was adapted into a film in 2000.

== Honors ==
- 1960 – Prix du Cercle du livre de France
- 1965 – Prix Jean-Hamelin, Éthel et le terroriste
- 1970 – Prix Québec-Paris, La Sablière
- 1980 – Prix Ludger-Duvernay
- 1980 – Prix France-Canada, La Sablière
- 2016 – Prix Athanase-David (Prix du Québec)
