= Over My Head (film) =

1964 Canadian film

- French: Jusqu'au cou
- Directed by: Denis Héroux
- Written by: Denis Héroux; Denys Arcand; Gilles Groulx; Pierre Lemelin; Jean Rivard
- Starring: Raymond Levasseur; Édith de Villers; Guy Dufresne
- Cinematography: Michel Brault; Jean-Claude Labrecque
- Edited by: Pierre Lemelin
- Music by: Stéphane Venne
- Production company: Association des étudiants de l'Université de Montréal
- Release date: December 11, 1964
- Running time: 88 minutes
- Country: Canada
- Language: French

Over My Head (French: Jusqu'au cou, lit. "Up to the Neck") is a Canadian drama film, directed by Denis Héroux and released in 1964. The film stars Raymond Levasseur as Raymond Cardinal, a university student who begins a relationship with fellow student Édith (Édith de Villers), only to set off a chain of complications when he discovers that she is also having an affair with his father François (Guy Dufresne), a professor at the same institution.

It was made as a student film while Héroux was in film studies at the Université de Montréal, and never received widespread commercial distribution beyond screenings at the university; however, the film was later noted for having documentary value, as its scenes include brief appearances by Pierre Bourgault, André D'Allemagne, Pierre Trudeau and Gérard Pelletier as themselves conducting political debates on Quebec separatism at the university, and a performance by Bernard Landry in a small role as a Front de libération du Québec terrorist. In 2010, it was included in a retrospective screening series at the Cinémathèque québécoise devoted to films of the Quiet Revolution.
