= Lindberg (album) =

Studio album by Robert Charlebois and Louise Forestier
- Released: 1968
- Genre: psychedelic rock

Robert Charlebois chronology
Demain l'hiver... (1967)	Lindberg (1968)	Québec Love (1969)

Louise Forestier chronology
La boulée (1967)	Lindberg (1968)	La douce Emma (1969)

Lindberg is an album by Robert Charlebois and Louise Forestier, released in 1968. The album was originally released as Robert Charlebois avec Louise Forestier, but came to be better known as Lindberg after its most famous and influential song (#13 RPM CanCon chart). Most follow-up reissues of the album used the Lindberg title, although the version currently available for sale on iTunes and streaming on Spotify restores the original eponymous title.

Considered a classic of Quebec music, it was the first album Charlebois recorded after his visit to California in 1967. Incorporating psychedelic rock influences, it marked his evolution away from the chansonnier tradition of francophone pop music. It was also his first album to feature lyrics written and sung in the joual register of Quebec French.

The album was a transformative touchstone in Quebec's musical culture, almost singlehandedly shifting the province's dominant musical style from traditional chansonnier pop to contemporary rock and turning Charlebois into one of the province's key musical icons of the 1960s and 1970s.

In 2015, the Polaris Music Prize committee shortlisted Lindberg as one of the nominees for the 1960s-1970s component of its inaugural Heritage Award to honour classic Canadian albums.

== Track listing ==
1. "California"
2. "La marche du président"
3. "Lindberg"
4. "CPR Blues"
5. "Joe Finger Ledoux"
6. "Egg Génération"
7. "Engagement"
8. "Dolores"
9. "Long Flight"
