= Alone or with Others =

1962 Canadian film

- French: Seul ou avec d'autres
- Directed by: Denys Arcand; Denis Héroux; Stéphane Venne
- Written by: Denys Arcand; Stéphane Venne
- Produced by: Denis Héroux; Georges Lefebvre
- Starring: Nicole Braun; Pierre Létourneau; André Dubois; Michelle Boulizon
- Cinematography: Michel Brault
- Edited by: Bernard Gosselin; Gilles Groulx
- Music by: Stéphane Venne
- Production company: Association générale des étudiants de l'Université de Montréal
- Release date: April 20, 1962
- Running time: 64 minutes
- Country: Canada
- Language: French

Alone or with Others (French: Seul ou avec d'autres) is a Canadian docufiction film released in 1962. Co-directed by Denys Arcand, Denis Héroux and Stéphane Venne while they were students at the Université de Montréal, it was one of two Canadian films to be screened at the 1963 Cannes Film Festival.

The film centres on Nicole (Nicole Braun), a first-year university student who begins a romance with Pierre (Pierre Létourneau).
