= Réjeanne Padovani =

- Directed by: Denys Arcand
- Written by: Denys Arcand; Jacques Benoît
- Produced by: Marguerite Duparc
- Starring: Jean Lajeunesse; Luce Guilbeault; Léo Gagnon; Thérèse Cadorette
- Cinematography: Alain Dostie
- Edited by: Denys Arcand; Marguerite Duparc
- Music by: Walter Boudreau
- Production company: Cinak
- Distributed by: Cinepix Film Properties
- Release date: October 3, 1973
- Running time: 96 minutes
- Country: Canada
- Language: French

Réjeanne Padovani is a Canadian drama film from Quebec, written and directed by Denys Arcand and released in 1973. It was his second narrative feature film as a director, but the first for which he was also the screenwriter alongside novelist Jacques Benoît (who also wrote his previous solo effort).

An examination of political corruption, the film stars Jean Lajeunesse as Vincent Padovani, a construction contractor with mafia ties who has just completed work on a major autoroute project, and is planning a major dinner party to thank the politicians who awarded him the contract. However, as the dinner approaches his plans are disrupted, both professionally by the launch of a public protest by several families whose homes were expropriated for the highway construction and personally by the return of Réjeanne (Luce Guilbeault), his ex-wife who is now married into the family of rival contractor Sam Tannenbaum (Henry Gamer).

Réjeanne Padovani and Wedding in White were the only two Canadian films screened at the 1973 Cannes Film Festival. The French newspaper Le Monde called Réjeanne Padovani one of the best films screened at the festival. The film was a Canadian Film Award nominee for Best Feature Film at the 25th Canadian Film Awards in 1973.

It was later screened at the 1984 Festival of Festivals as part of Front & Centre, a special retrospective program of artistically and culturally significant films from throughout the history of Canadian cinema.

During Quebec's Charbonneau Commission inquiry into corruption in the awarding of construction contracts in the early 2010s, the film received renewed attention with some media outlets calling it "prophetic".
