= Jean Cousineau =

Canadian composer and violinist

- Born: November 6, 1937; Montreal, Quebec, Canada
- Died: April 4, 2013 (aged 75); Montreal, Quebec, Canada
- Education: Bachelor of Arts in music (Université de Montréal); Doctorate in educational sciences
- Occupations: Violinist, Educator, Composer
- Relatives: Luc Cousineau (brother); François Cousineau (brother)

Jean Cousineau (6 November 1937 – 4 April 2013) was a Canadian violinist, educator, and composer from Quebec.

== Biography ==
Jean Cousineau was born on 6 November 1937 in Montreal, Quebec, Canada. He was brother to Luc Cousineau and François Cousineau. He studied violin with Marcel Saucier at 8 years old. He graduated from a Bachelor of Arts in music at the Université de Montréal in 1958. Thanks to grants from the Ministère des Affaires culturelles du Québec and the Canada Council, he studied in Paris with René Benedetti (violin) and Renée Jamet-Hansen (harmony and counterpoint).

After returning to Canada, Cousineau taught violin at the Institut des arts du Saguenay. He consulted the Japanese educator Shinichi Suzuki in summer 1965, and developed a violin method for young people based on Suzuki's work. While in Tokyo he published Canadian Music in English and Japanese.

Cousineau returned to Montreal in autumn 1965 and founded the École des Petits Violons to train young violinists. In February 1974, he founded the Ensemble Les Petits Violons, composed of more advanced students. He made arrangements for the Ensemble and conducted it in concerts and recordings. Chantal Julliet, Angèle Dubeau and Martin Chalifour were his students.

Cousineau earned his PhD in educational sciences in 1988. The next year, he published his doctoral thesis, De la nature du violon: le violon nous enseigne.

Jean Cousineau died on 4 April 2013 from cancer in Montreal. He was honored by the National Assembly of Quebec on 8 May 2013. By his death, he had written over 100 compositions. His daughter Marie-Claire is the director of the École des Petits Violons and his daughter Yukari is first violin with the Metropolitan Orchestra of Greater Montréal.

== Awards ==
- 1964 – Orchestration Prize at the Sopot Festival for ''Jack Monoloy''
- 1971 – Canadian Film Award for the score of ''Mon oncle Antoine''
- 1972 – Special Jury Prize at the San Remo International Festival for the score of ''Mon oncle Antoine''
- 1972 – Gold Medal at the San Remo International Festival for the score of ''Mon oncle Antoine''
- 1977 – Anik Award for the score of ''Dreamspeaker''
- 1977 – Canadian Film Award for the score of ''Dreamspeaker''
- 1978 – Canadian Film Award, Young Man of Outstanding Merit
- 1978 – Medal for Exceptional Artistic Achievement awarded by Queen Elizabeth II of England
- 1982 – Genie Award nomination for the score of ''Les beaux souvenirs''
- 1988 – Calixa-Lavallée Award and ''Bene merenti de patria'' medal awarded by the Société Saint-Jean-Baptiste
- 1993 – 125th Anniversary of the Confederation of Canada Medal
- 2000 – Nomination for “Personality of the Week” by the newspaper ''La Presse''

== Filmography ==
Soundtracks
Year	Title
1963	Pour la suite du monde
1963	À tout prendre
1970	Mon Oncle Antoine
1973	Taureau
1976	Dreamspeaker
1981	Surfacing
1981	Les Beaux souvenirs
1983	A Far Cry from Heaven
