= The Handyman (1980 film) =

1980 film directed by Micheline Lanctôt

- French: L'Homme à tout faire
- Directed by: Micheline Lanctôt
- Written by: Micheline Lanctôt
- Produced by: René Malo
- Starring: Jocelyn Bérubé; Andrée Pelletier
- Cinematography: André Gagnon
- Edited by: Annick de Bellefeuille
- Music by: François Lanctôt
- Distributed by: René Malo Films
- Release date: 14 March 1980
- Running time: 99 minutes
- Country: Canada
- Language: French
- Budget: $500,000; $525,000; $575,000

The Handyman (French: L'Homme à tout faire) is a 1980 Canadian drama/romance film written and directed by Micheline Lanctôt, in her directorial debut.

The film stars Jocelyn Bérubé, Andrée Pelletier, Marcel Sabourin, Madeleine Guerin, Paul Dion and Pauline Lapointe. The film earned six Genie Award nominations at the 2nd Genie Awards in 1981. The film was also the only Canadian production selected for the Directors' Fortnight at the 1980 Cannes Film Festival.

== Plot ==
The film centres on Armand Dorion, a shy, self-conscious man who works as a handyman, who falls hopelessly in love with woman after woman, each destined to break his heart.

Armand's wife has left him and people are prone to take advantage of him because of his understanding nature. After he is hired to do some work for Thérèse St-Amant, a married woman, whose husband is a boor; she turns out to be as shy and self-conscious as him, so the two begin a love affair.

The film also includes Georges, Armand's gay roommate who works as a limousine driver and has unrequited feelings of his own for Armand.

== Cast ==
- Jocelyn Bérubé as Armand
- Andrée Pelletier as Therese
- Marcel Sabourin as Georges
- Madeleine Guerin as Mere
- Paul Dion as Coquel'oeil
- Pauline Lapointe as Huguette
- Francis Labrecque as Pierrort
- Martin Labrecque as Jean-Marie
- Camille Belanger as La serveuse
- Danielle Schneider as Manon
- Louise Lambert as Louise
- Martine Pratt as Nathalie
- Janette Bertrand as Lamarche

== Background ==
The film was financed partly by the Canadian government after Lanctôt's partner of many years, Canadian film director Ted Kotcheff agreed to supervise the project. The shooting schedule for the film was six weeks.

Lanctôt recalls that she was criticized in Canada by feminists "because they thought my portrayal of women was savage." She went on to rebut that argument stating there are actually women like that, speaking of the "three women in Dorion's life who leave him because they are alternately bored, fickle and ambitious."

The movie was the only Canadian production selected for the Directors' Fortnight at the 1980 Cannes Film Festival. Lanctôt told The Canadian Press that having your film shown at Cannes is crucial for distribution, and being featured in the Fortnight "means you get much better coverage." She also acknowledged she wants her movie to make a profit:

After a year and a half of working on a film, you want a return on your investment. Sure the artistic goals are there when you start a movie, but I'm not like a writer or a painter who only has a few dollars tied in material. I have a lot of money hanging over my head.

== Reception ==
Film critic Vincent Canby wrote "the performances are pretty much defined by the material, though Andree Pelletier, has some good if difficult moments as a bored housewife; the film moves slowly; in addition, the director has slopped thick, viscous music over the movie in the manner of someone trying to plug a leak in a roof; if tar could make a noise, this is what it would sound like."

In respone to Canby's negative review in The New York Times. Lanctôt remarked:

I must say Canby ruined my breakfast. My omelette stayed on my plate. I was compared to Eisenstein, my lead actor to a dog, and my lead actress to a television star. I stopped paying attention to reviews a long time ago, except how they affect the existence of the film, and The Times review is the only one that matters in New York. The review means that the distribution deal may not be all we hoped for.

Canadian film critic Jay Scott said it is a "film that earns one's good will slowly but surely; it is an auspicious if not especially dazzling debut for Lanctôt; Andrée Pelletier is a comedic tour de force, in scene after scene, she surprises and delights; the film in the end, is like its hero — sweetly sympathetic and understanding." Critic Carole Corbeil opined "the film had grit, authenticity and humor ... much of what makes the film the gem it is has to do with the detailed and unhurried characterizations of the actors." Michael Auerback from LA Weekly commented the film is "a melancholy reflection on lost love in the manner of Renoir."

John Kiely from the Waterloo Region Record observed "the story is not complex, and that lack of complexity is one of the film's many benefits; Lanctôt's script is exceptionally suited for film and with the performances of her two leads, her own competent direction and the sense of place she brings to this secure little film — the film is simply not to be missed." Dave Chenoweth of The Gazette offered "though the film sometimes shoves rather than seduces the viewer, Lanctôt's behind-the-camera launch offers good entertainment."

== Awards ==
The film earned six Genie Award nominations at the 2nd Genie Awards in 1981.

Award	Date of ceremony	Category	Recipient(s)	Result	Ref(s)
Genie Awards	12 March 1981	Best Motion Picture	René Malo	Nominated	
Genie Awards	12 March 1981	Best Actor	Jocelyn Bérubé	Nominated	
Genie Awards	12 March 1981	Best Actress	Andrée Pelletier	Nominated	
Genie Awards	12 March 1981	Best Director	Micheline Lanctôt	Nominated	
Genie Awards	12 March 1981	Best Original Screenplay	Micheline Lanctôt	Nominated	
Genie Awards	12 March 1981	Best Art Direction/Production Design	Normand Sarazin	Nominated	

== See also ==
- Cinema of Canada
- Montreal in films
- List of Canadian films of 1980
- Top 10 Canadian Films of All Time
- List of LGBTQ-related films of 1980
