= Rope Around the Neck =

- French: La corde au cou
- Directed by: Pierre Patry
- Written by: Pierre Patry
- Based on: La Corde au cou by Claude Jasmin
- Produced by: Pierre Patry
- Starring: Guy Godin; Andrée Lachapelle; Henri Norbert
- Cinematography: Jean Roy
- Edited by: Lucien Marleau
- Music by: François Cousineau
- Production company: Coopératio
- Distributed by: France Film
- Release date: November 5, 1965
- Running time: 104 minutes
- Country: Canada
- Language: French

Rope Around the Neck (French: La corde au cou) is a Canadian crime drama film, directed by Pierre Patry and released in 1965. Based on a novel by Claude Jasmin, the film stars Guy Godin as Léo Longpré, a man who is on the run from the police after murdering his mistress Suzanne (Andrée Lachapelle).

The cast also includes Henri Norbert, Jean Duceppe, Denise Pelletier, Tania Fédor, Guy L'Écuyer and Jean-Louis Millette.

The film was not well-received by critics, which contributed to Patry's decision to stop making narrative films.
