= The Men (1971 film) =

- French: Les Mâles
- Directed by: Gilles Carle
- Written by: Gilles Carle
- Produced by: Louise Ranger
- Starring: Donald Pilon; René Blouin; Andrée Pelletier
- Cinematography: René Verzier
- Edited by: Gilles Carle
- Music by: Stéphane Venne
- Production company: Onyx Films
- Distributed by: France Film
- Release date: March 3, 1971
- Running time: 113 minutes
- Country: Canada
- Language: French

The Men (French: Les Mâles) is a Canadian crime comedy film, written and directed by Gilles Carle and released in 1971. The film centres on Jean (Donald Pilon) and Émile (René Blouin), a lumberjack and a student who have been living off the grid in the wilderness, who decide that they need a woman to join them and head into town to look for one. They resort to kidnapping Dolores (Katerine Mousseau), a prison guard who is the daughter of the village police chief, leading the villagers to mount a vigilante mob to capture Jean and Émile and bring them to justice.

The film's cast also includes Andrée Pelletier and Guy L'Écuyer.

Martin Knelman of The Globe and Mail reviewed the film favourably, writing that "At his most brilliant, Carle achieves a form of comedy that's part Rabelaisian and part Keystone Kops, but just under the surface of slapstick raucousness there's a sense of desperation, of despair on the brink of violence and defeat. This double-sighted attitude is what gives Carle's movies their peculiar comic edge and their self-propelling energy."

The film’s theme song, "Le temps est bon", written by Stéphane Venne and performed by Isabelle Pierre, became a major hit in Quebec and is now regarded as her signature recording.

== Reception ==
The film was seen by 302,950 people in France.

== Works cited ==
- Marshall, Bill (2001). Quebec National Cinema. McGill–Queen's University Press. ISBN 0-7735-2103-8.
