= An American Story =

1986 novel by Jacques Godbout

- Author: Jacques Godbout
- Original title: Une histoire américaine
- Translator: Yves Saint-Pierre
- Language: French
- Publisher: Éditions du Seuil (first edition), University of Minnesota Press (English translation)
- Publication date: 1986
- Publication place: France
- English publication date: 1988
- Media type: Print
- Pages: 182 p.
- ISBN: 202009326X
- OCLC: 14994156

An American Story (French: Une histoire américaine) is a novel published in 1986 by Canadian writer Jacques Godbout. Its English translation, by Yves Saint-Pierre, was published in 1988.

== Plot summary ==
Grégory Francœur, a brilliant professor from Quebec, leaves his family and political career behind to become the assistant to a distinguished academic in San Francisco. Because of a misunderstanding, typical of the ambiguity that has been Francœur's lot in life, he becomes involved in a dangerous case of illegal immigration.

== Impact ==
Une histoire américaine was one of the novels chosen for inclusion in the French version of Canada Reads, broadcast on Première Chaîne in 2004, where it was championed by trade unionist Gérald Larose.
