= The Ideal Man =

- French: L'Homme idéal
- Directed by: George Mihalka
- Written by: Daniaile Jarry; Sylvie Pilon
- Produced by: Daniaile Jarry; Christian Larouche
- Starring: Marie-Lise Pilote; Roy Dupuis
- Cinematography: Rodney Gibbons
- Edited by: François Gill
- Music by: François Dompierre
- Production companies: Cinépix; Quatrieme Vague
- Release date: September 27, 1996
- Running time: 110 minutes
- Country: Canada
- Language: French

The Ideal Man (French: L'Homme idéal) is a Canadian romantic comedy film, directed by George Mihalka and released in 1996. The film stars Marie-Lise Pilote as Lucie, a successful magazine editor who feels her biological clock ticking as she has reached the age of 35 without becoming a mother, and sets out on a quest to meet as many men as possible over the next three months in the hopes of finally finding the ideal man to father a child.

The film's cast also includes Roy Dupuis, Macha Grenon, Linda Sorgini, Pauline Lapointe, Denis Bouchard, Patrice L'Ecuyer, Joe Bocan, Rita Lafontaine, Martin Drainville and Rémy Girard.

The film received two Genie Award nominations at the 18th Genie Awards, for Best Original Score (François Dompierre) and Best Original Song (Dompierre and Luc Plamondon for "L'Homme idéal"). It won the award for Best Original Song.
