= Dirty Money (1972 film) =

- French: La Maudite Galette
- Directed by: Denys Arcand
- Written by: Jacques Benoît
- Produced by: Marguerite Duparc; Pierre Lamy
- Starring: Marcel Sabourin; Luce Guilbeault; René Caron; Gabriel Arcand
- Cinematography: Alain Dostie
- Edited by: Marguerite Duparc
- Release date: September 7, 1972
- Running time: 100 minutes
- Country: Canada
- Language: French

Dirty Money (French: La Maudite Galette) is a Canadian drama film from Quebec, directed by Denys Arcand and released in 1972. It was the first feature-length narrative film directed by Arcand.

The film stars René Caron and Luce Guilbeault as Rolland and Berthe Soucy, a couple who are financially struggling. Rolland's wealthy uncle Arthur (Léo Gagnon) comes for a visit and offers them a gift of money to help out, but withdraws the offer after they quibble with the amount; after he leaves, Rolland and Berthe decide to go to his house and rob him. Unbeknownst to them, however, their reclusive tenant Ernest (Marcel Sabourin) follows them with a criminal plan of his own.

It was later screened at the 1984 Festival of Festivals as part of Front & Centre, a special retrospective program of artistically and culturally significant films from throughout the history of Canadian cinema.
