= Gérald Larose =

Canadian activist (born 1945)

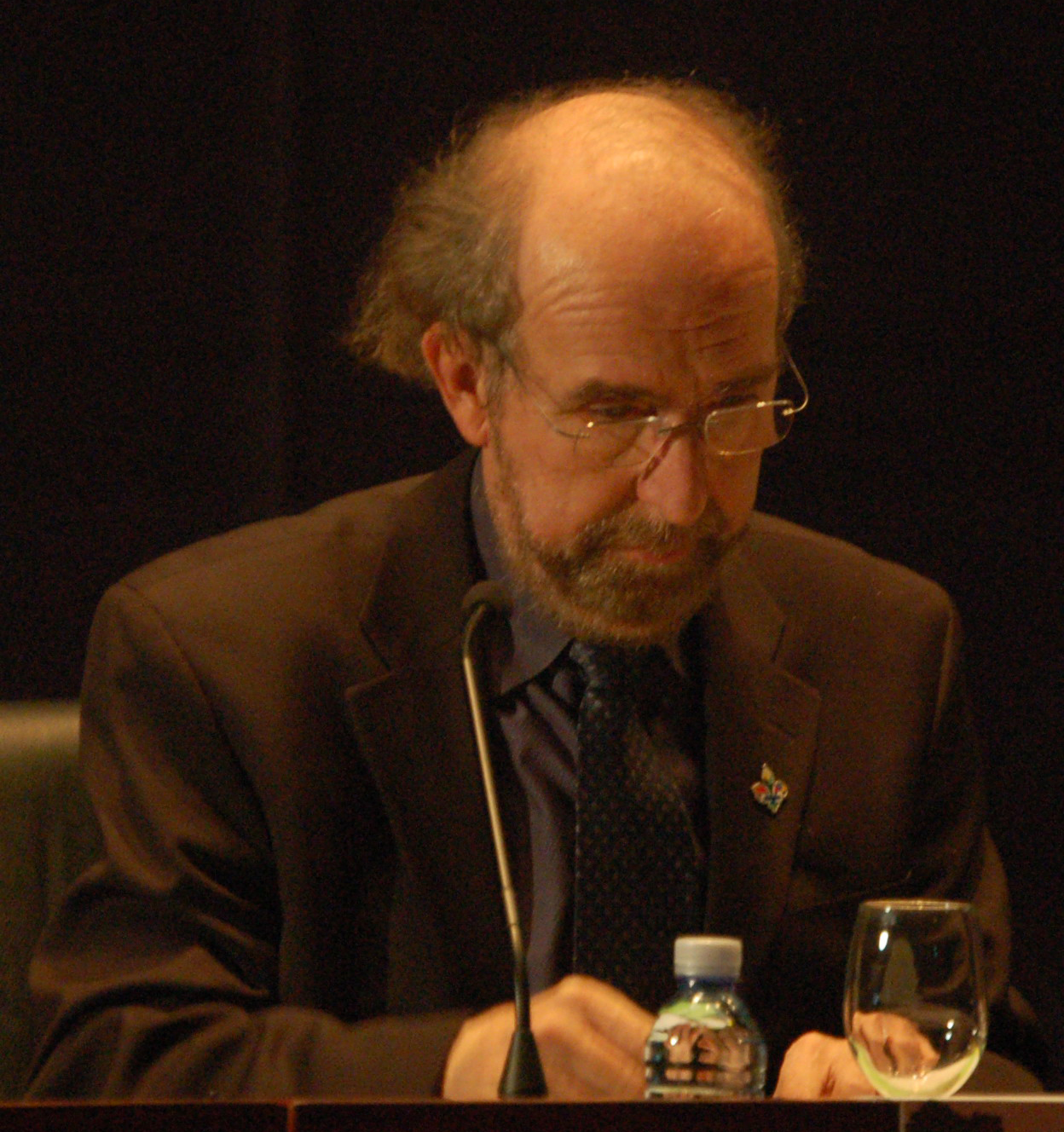
Gérald Larose (17/12/2009)

Gérald Larose (born October 24, 1945) is a Canadian activist, professor, and former President of the Confédération des syndicats nationaux labour union. Between 2003 and 2013, he was president of the Organisations unies pour l'indépendance, a Quebec independence organization. He was succeeded by Gilbert Paquette.

Larose defended Jacques Godbout's novel Une histoire américaine in Le Combat des livres, the French version of Canada Reads, broadcast on the radio of Société Radio-Canada in 2004. He was awarded the title of Patriote de l'année ("Patriot of the Year") by the Saint-Jean-Baptiste Society in 1996.
