= Jocelyn Bérubé =

Canadian storyteller, actor and composer

Jocelyn Bérubé (born September 16, 1946, in Saint-Nil (Matane), Quebec) is a Canadian actor, musician and storyteller. He was best known for his leading role in the 1980 film The Handyman (L'Homme à tout faire), for which he garnered a Genie Award nomination for Best Actor at the 2nd Genie Awards in 1981.

His other roles have included the films The Great Ordinary Movie (Le Grand film ordinaire), The Conquest (La Conquête), Montreal Blues, Ordinary Tenderness (Tendresse ordinaire), Gina, The Absence (L'Absence), J.A. Martin Photographer (J.A. Martin photographe), Bach and Broccoli (Bach et bottine), In the Shadow of the Wind, Love Crazy and A Cry in the Night (Le Cri de la nuit), and the television series The Mills of Power (Les Tisserands du pouvoir), Au nom du père et du fils and Le Sorcier.

As a musician, he performs as a fiddler, and composed the score for the 1973 film Tendresse ordinaire.
