= Watchtower (2001 film) =

2001 Canadian thriller film

- Film poster
- Directed by: George Mihalka
- Written by: Rod Browning; Robert Geoffrion; Dan Witt
- Produced by: John A. Curtis; Richard O. Lowry; Evan Taylor; Evan Tylor
- Starring: Tom Berenger; Rachel Hayward; Tygh Runyan
- Cinematography: Peter Benison
- Edited by: Glenn Berman
- Music by: Michel Cusson
- Production companies: Alliance Atlantis Communications; Frontline Entertainment; GFT Entertainment; H30 Filmed Entertainment Inc. Le Monde Entertainment
- Distributed by: Alliance Atlantis Communications
- Release date: December 19, 2001
- Running time: 100 minutes
- Country: Canada
- Language: English
- Budget: $CAD5,100,000 (estimated)

Watchtower (also known as Cruel and Unusual) is a 2001 Canadian thriller film directed by George Mihalka and starring Tom Berenger, Rachel Hayward and Tygh Runyan.

== Synopsis ==
A man (Tom Berenger) and woman have a tryst in a small house on a rainy, peaceful night. As the man smokes, they discuss a future together and just as she's drifted off to sleep he kills her with a single stab wound to the chest. The man cuts his hair, shaves his beard, and tucks the dead woman into bed before he leaves.

Kate O'Conner (Rachel Hayward) comes home from her stint on her fishing boat and is ambushed in her apartment by her younger brother, Mike (Tygh Runyan). She's managed to find him a job at a lighthouse near the town she lives in following a run of bad behavior while he lived in Chicago.

The man is picked up on the road by a clean cut college professor, Adam Terrell (Eli Gabay), on sabbatical. The man introduces himself as Art Stoner. On a stop on the side of the road, the Art hikes a bit away and Adam follows. On a cliff overlooking the ocean, Art kills Adam with the same knife. Using Adam's car he continues on to the small town to join Mike at the lighthouse. He tells Mike that he's Adam Terrell, the second person meant to watch over the lighthouse. The two hit it off and through Mike, Art meets Kate.

All three have dinner one night and the next morning, Art gives Kate the necklace the woman from the beginning was wearing, telling her he bought it in Savannah and that it would bring her good luck. She ships off for a fishing trip.

Art and Mike go on a hike together where Mike tells Art about his terrible relationship with his dead fisherman father. Once they reach the ocean, Art surreptitiously pushes Mike into the ocean before saving him. That night, over a bottle of Jack, Art plays himself at chess and tells Mike the story of Eddie, a young man whose mother was a prostitute and who made him watch. He tells Mike how Eddie likes to make people happy and then kill them, that it is Eddie's gift. Mike ends up getting wasted and vomiting.

While Art is out breaking into Kate's place the next day, Mike snoops in Art's stuff and finds Adam Terrell's journal, which is very different from Art's own writing. Mike accidentally spills coffee on the notebooks but manages not to be caught snooping. Art goes to meet Kate as she returns to harbor and she takes him bird watching. When Art returns to the lighthouse, he finds it messy and hits Mike before telling him to shake it off.

Art goes to the beach with Kate and the two have sex afterwards, with Mike seeing them from outside Kate's window. Back at the lighthouse when Mike confronts Art, Art hits him before holding him and comforting him. Kate doesn't believe Mike when he tells her that Art struck him out of nowhere. Kate storms off to her boat and Art follows. He brings her a bouquet of dead flowers and the two ride out into the harbor. While on the bed in the boat together Art encourages Kate to go to college.

Mike goes to the bar in town and hears about a serial killer. He suspects Art and goes to tell Kate who doesn't believe him. She thinks he's jealous of her relationship with Art, similar to how their father liked her more than him. Mike returns to the lighthouse and rifles through the drawer looking for the flare gun, but Art is behind him, holding the flare gun.

The Sheriff and Art approach Kate on her boat and tells her that Mike has disappeared. Kate goes to the bar looking for Mike, where she sees the wanted poster for the serial killer. Kate looks at the picture she drew of Art and realizes that Mike was right. Just then, Art arrives at her home. She goes down to her boat with Mike right behind her. He asks again and again whether she loves him, pestering her to know if he's made her happy. She knocks him into the water and he doesn't resurface. The next morning, Kate stands on the dock with the Sheriff.

In a city somewhere, Art, dressed as Mike, puts a letter addressed to Kate into a mailbox. He sees a woman exiting the store behind him and smiles at her before walking off into the night.

== Cast ==
- Tom Berenger as Art Stoner
- Rachel Hayward as Kate O'Conner
- Tygh Runyan as Mike O'Conner
- Eli Gabay as Adam Terrell

== Reception ==
Moria.co gave the film a good review. Watchtower got three stars and the reviewer stated: "Watchtower/Cruel and Unusual offers Mihalka the best budget he has ever had to date and he does wonders with it. There is some particularly beautiful and impressive location scenery – despite being set in Seattle, the film is in actuality shot a little further up the coast in the somberly beautiful area of Vancouver Island, where Mihalka does a fine job of capturing the verisimilitude of a small fishing town."

Reviewer M. Lion of the website chickflickingreviews.com called it a "well made movie" and noted that the twists were "quite fun".
