= La Florida (film) =

1993 Canadian comedy film

- Directed by: George Mihalka
- Written by: Suzette Couture; Pierre Sarrazin
- Produced by: Claude Bonin; Jacques Bonin; Suzette Couture; Pierre Sarrazin
- Starring: Rémy Girard; Pauline Lapointe; Raymond Bouchard; Yvan Canuel; Marie-Josée Croze; Michael Sarrazin; Margot Kidder
- Cinematography: Rene Ohashi
- Distributed by: Vivafilm
- Release date: 1993
- Country: Canada
- Languages: French; English
- Box office: C$1.6 million (Canada)

La Florida is a Canadian comedy film, released in 1993. The film was directed by George Mihalka, and written by Suzette Couture and Pierre Sarrazin.

== Synopsis ==
The film stars Rémy Girard and Pauline Lapointe as Léo and Ginette Lespérance, a married couple who, after facing one too many Montreal winters, move their family to Fort Lauderdale, where they buy a motel catering to "snowbirds". However, their new business runs afoul of "Big Daddy" (Raymond Bouchard), an established motel operator and local crime boss, who makes it his mission to drive the Lespérances out of business.

The Lespérances may, however, have an ally in Jay Lamori (Jason Blicker), a local businessman of uncertain motives who may or may not be what he seems.

== Award nominations ==
The film received eight Genie Award nominations at the 14th Genie Awards, including Best Motion Picture, Best Director, Best Actor (Girard), Best Actress (Lapointe), Best Supporting Actor (Yvan Canuel), Best Screenplay (Couture, Sarrazin), Best Overall Sound (Dino Pigat, Lou Solakofski, Douglas Ganton, David Appleby) and Best Sound Editing (Marc Chiasson, Terry Burke, Jane Tattersall, Sean Kelly, Drew King, Tony Currie, Diane Boucher).

The film did not win any of the awards. It was, however, given the Golden Reel Award as the top-grossing Canadian film of the year with a gross of C$1.6 million.
