= IXE-13 =

1971 Canadian film

- Directed by: Jacques Godbout
- Written by: Jacques Godbout
- Based on: Les Aventures étranges de l'Agent IXE-13 by Pierre Daignault
- Produced by: Pierre Gauvreau
- Starring: André Dubois; Louise Forestier
- Cinematography: Thomas Vámos
- Edited by: Werner Nold
- Music by: François Dompierre
- Production company: National Film Board of Canada
- Release date: 1971
- Running time: 115 minutes
- Country: Canada
- Language: French

IXE-13 is a 1971 Canadian spy comedy film, written and directed by Jacques Godbout.

Made in conjunction with the sketch comedy troupe Les Cyniques, that included Serge Grenier, Marc Laurendeau, Marcel Saint-Germain and André Dubois. The film stars the latter as Jean Thibault, agent "IXE-13", the "Ace of Canadian Spies", who sets off to save his fiancée Gisèle after she is kidnapped while he is on a mission. Louise Forestier also stars in a dual role as both Gisèle and Taya, the "Queen of the Chinese Communists" who undergoes plastic surgery to look like Gisèle as part of her plot to get close enough to IXE-13 to kill him. Its cast also includes Louisette Dussault, Carole Laure and Luce Guilbeault.

The film was based on Paul Daignault's Les Aventures étranges de l'Agent IXE-13 series of pulp spy stories.

The film premiered theatrically in late 1971, before opening commercially in January 1972.
