= George Mihalka =

Hungarian-born Canadian filmmaker (born 1953)

- Born: 1953 (age 71–72); Hungary
- Occupation: Film director

George Mihalka (born 1953) is a Hungarian-born Canadian filmmaker. He is known for his 1981 slasher film My Bloody Valentine which was remade in 2009.

== Career ==
In Canada since 1963, George Mihalka studied film at Concordia University in Montreal, Quebec. In 1981, he directed My Bloody Valentine, a low-budget ‘slasher’ for Paramount that was a modest box office hit. He has since directed in Quebec, Europe and the U.S., moving with ease from French to English, comedy to drama, theatrical features to episodic television. His 1993 satirical feature, La Florida, about Quebec snowbirds, was a huge hit in that province and the Golden Reel Award winner for the highest-grossing Canadian film of the year.

== Filmography ==
- Pick-up Summer (1980)
- My Bloody Valentine (1981)
- Scandale (1982)
- The Blue Man (1985)
- Shades of Love: Midnight Magic (1988)
- Office Party (1988)
- Le chemin de Damas (1988)
- Crossbow: The Movie (1989)
- Straight Line (1990)
- Psychic (1991)
- The Final Heist (1991)
- La Florida (1993)
- Relative Fear (1994)
- Deceptions II: Edge of Deception (1995)
- Bullet to Beijing (1995)
- The Ideal Man (1996)
- Windsor Protocol (1996)
- Thunder Point (1998)
- Dr Lucille: The Lucille Teasdale Story (2001)
- Watchtower (2001)
- Les Boys IV (2005)
- Sticks and Stones (2008)
- Bloodlust: My Bloody Valentine and the Rise of the Slasher Film (2009)
- Faith, Fraud, & Minimum Wage (2011)
- Black Christmas Legacy (2015)
- Needles (TBA)

== Accolades ==
2025: A Canadian Trailblazer Award will be presented to him at the 29th Fantasia International Film Festival in July 2025.
