= Robert Charlebois =

Canadian musician, actor, and author (born 1944)

Robert Charlebois OC OQ
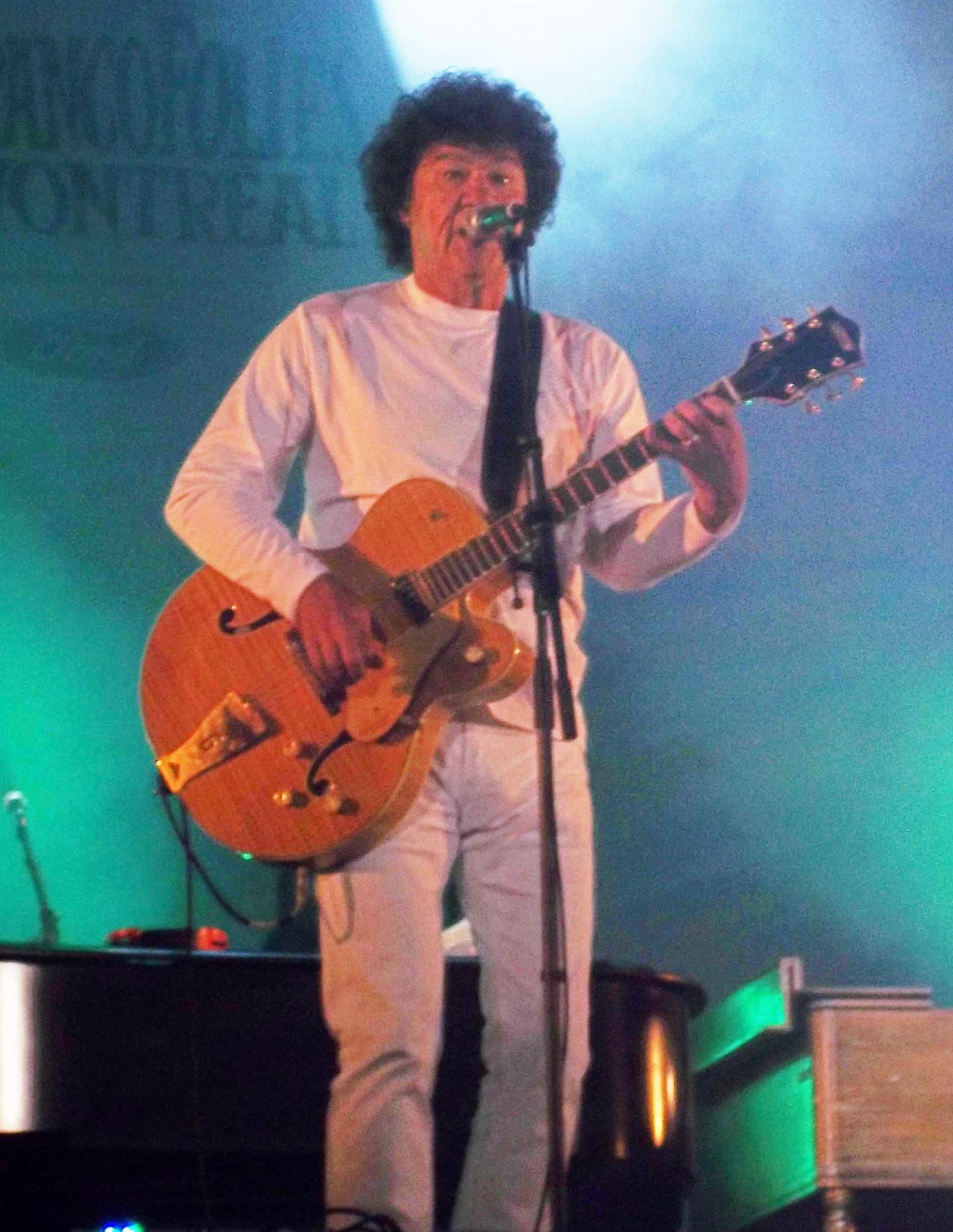
- Charlebois performing in Montreal in 2012.

Background information
- Born: June 25, 1944 (age 82); Montreal, Quebec, Canada
- Genres: Psychedelic rock, folk rock
- Occupations: Author, composer, musician, actor
- Instrument: Guitar

Robert Charlebois OC OQ (born June 25, 1944) is a Canadian author, composer, musician, performer and actor.

== Biography ==
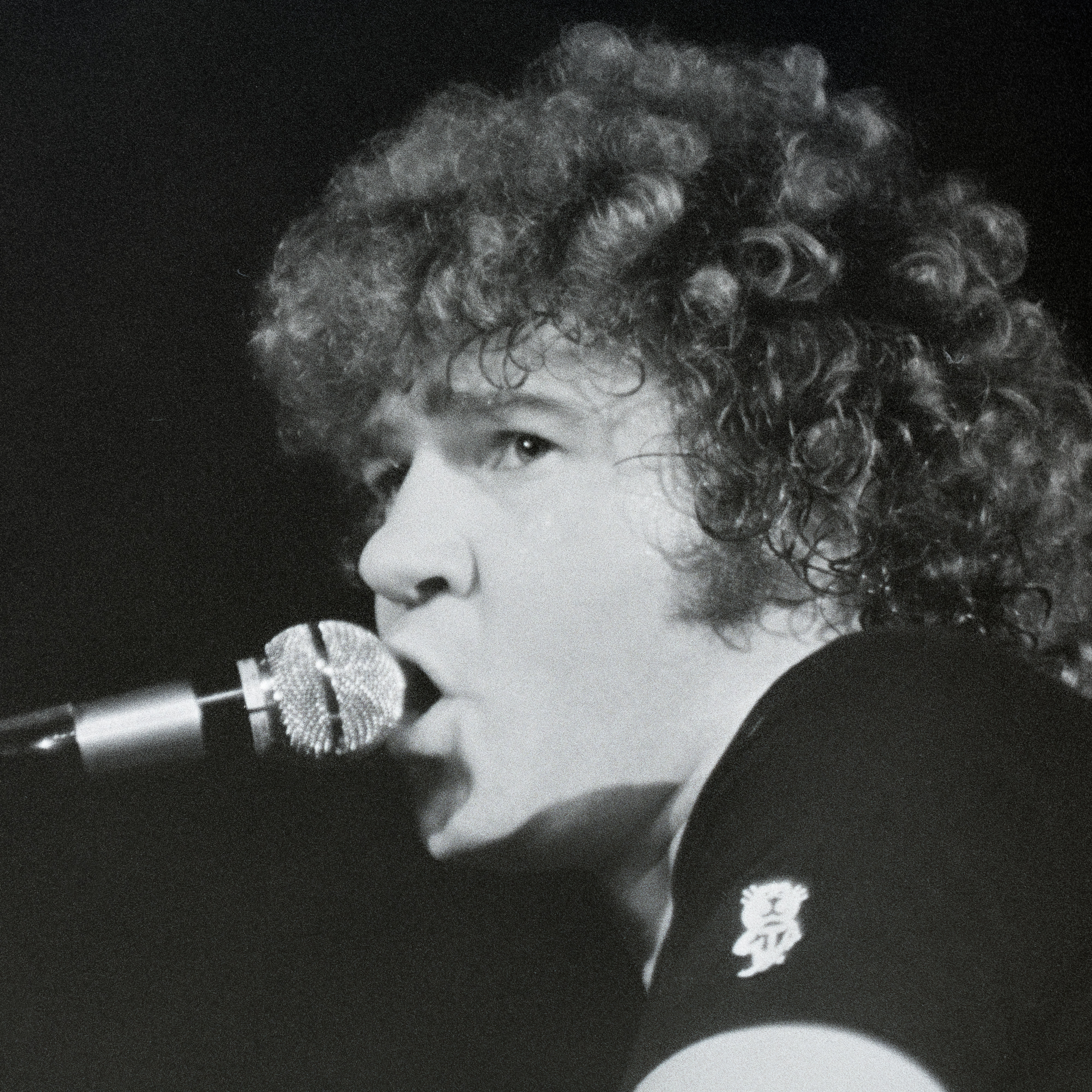
Robert Charlebois in Montreal, 1972

Charlebois was born in Montreal, Quebec. Among his best known songs are Lindberg (the duo with Louise Forestier in particular), Ordinaire, Les Ailes d'un Ange and Je reviendrai à Montréal. His lyrics, often written in joual, are funny, relying upon plays on words. He won the Sopot International Song Festival in 1970.

In 1970, he sang with Italian singer Patty Pravo the Italian song La solitudine. In the same year, he performed at the Festival Express train tour in Canada, but did not appear on the documentary film.

In 1968, he had an acting role in Jean Pierre Lefebvre's film Straight to the Heart (Jusqu'au cœur). He co-starred with Terence Hill, Miou-Miou and Patrick McGoohan in the western Un genio, due compari, un pollo (A Genius, Two Partners and a Dupe, 1975) as Steamengine Bill. Thirty-eight years later, Charlebois had a cameo as Jean-Seb Bigstone, the French-Canadian Broadway producer, in the 2012 Gad Elmaleh/Sophie Marceau film Happiness Never Comes Alone.

The Quebec-based microbrewery Unibroue was owned, in part, by Charlebois until it was purchased by Sleeman Breweries in 2004 which in turn was bought by Japanese beer brewing giant Sapporo in 2006.

He was inducted into the Canadian Songwriters Hall of Fame in 2010.

In 2021, he was named a Compagnon des arts et des lettres du Québec, in recognition of his role in "crystallizing the state of an awakened population" and his cultural influence through more than 50 years of creative contributions.

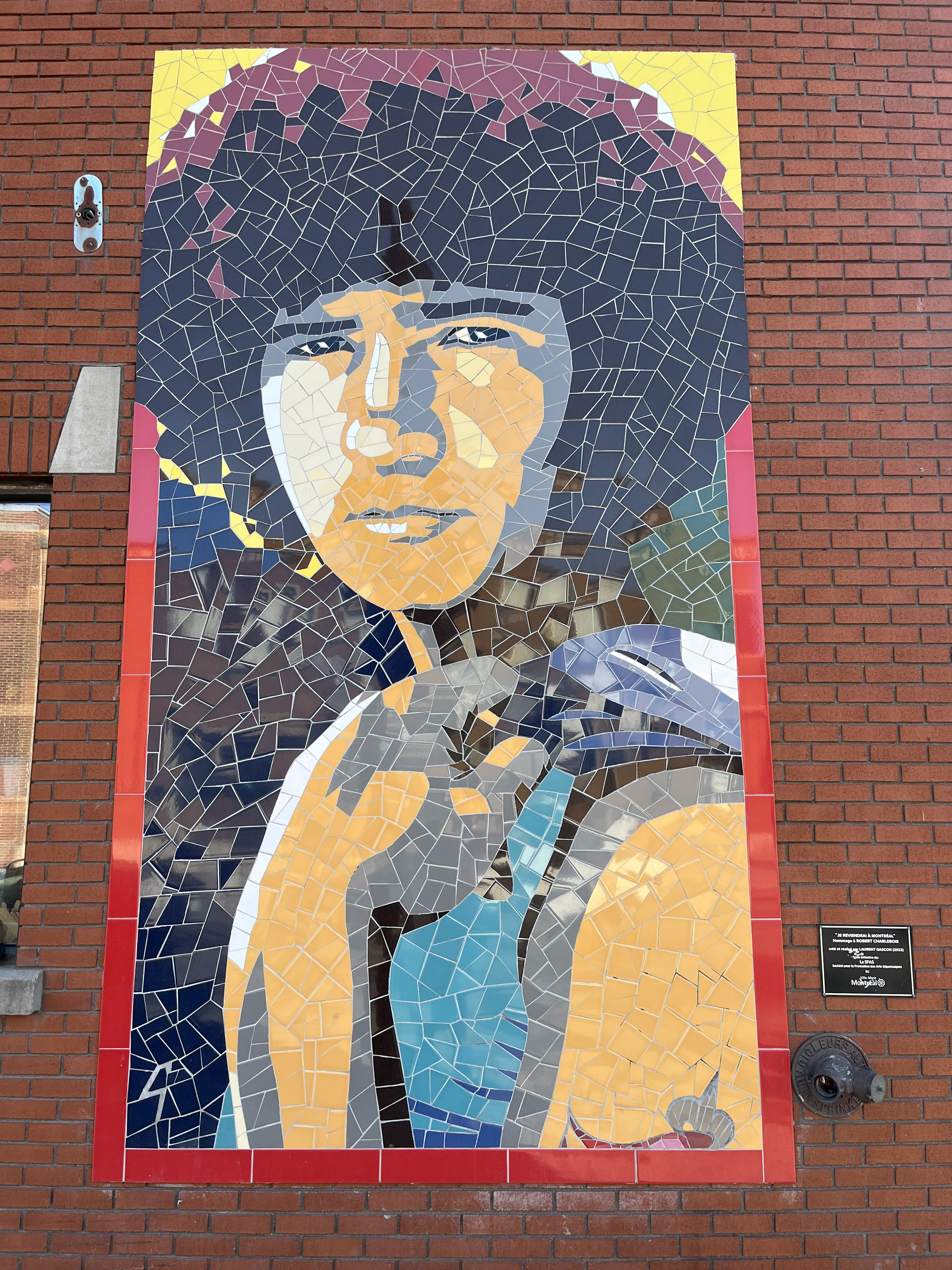
Mural of Robert Charlebois on Papineau Avenue in Montréal

On 31 January 2024 a new tour and show were announced in celebration of his 80th birthday year, with dates in Quebec and a Paris engagement.

== Honours ==
- In 1994, Charlebois received a Governor General's Performing Arts Award for Lifetime Artistic Achievement for his contribution to music in Canada.
- In 1999, he was appointed an Officer of the Order of Canada. In 2008, he was made an Officer of the National Order of Quebec.
- Charlebois was one of the four musicians who were pictured on the second series of the Canadian Recording Artist Series issued by Canada Post stamps on July 2, 2009.
- On June 21, 2010, Charlebois received an honorary doctorate from Concordia University in Montreal. In his acceptance speech he made the remark that this was the first post-secondary diploma he had received in his life.
- In 2016 he became a recipient of the Order of Montreal.
- In 2021, Charlebois was named a Compagnon des arts et des lettres du Québec.

== Music in films ==
- Between Salt and Sweet Water (Entre la mer et l'eau douce) (1967) by Michel Brault, with Geneviève Bujold, Claude Gauthier
- Je T'aimerai Toujours (1969; TV Movie)
- Two Women in Gold (Deux Femmes en or) (1970) by Claude Fournier, with Monique Mercure, Louise Turcot
- A Genius, Two Partners and a Dupe (1975) by Damiano Damiani, with Terence Hill, Patrick McGoohan
- L'Agression (1975) by Gérard Pirès, with Jean-Louis Trintignant, Catherine Deneuve
- The Bride Who Came In from the Cold (1983) by Charles Nemes, with Thierry Lhermitte, Barbara Nielsen
- Sauve-toi, Lola (1986) by Michel Drach, with Carole Laure, Jeanne Moreau
- August 32nd on Earth (Un 32 août sur terre) (1998) by Denis Villeneuve, with Pascale Bussières and Alexis Martin
- C.R.A.Z.Y. (2004) by Jean-Marc Vallée, with Michel Côté and Marc-André Grondin
- Gabrielle (2013) by Louise Archambault, with Mélissa Désormeaux-Poulin and Alexandre Landry

== Selected discography ==
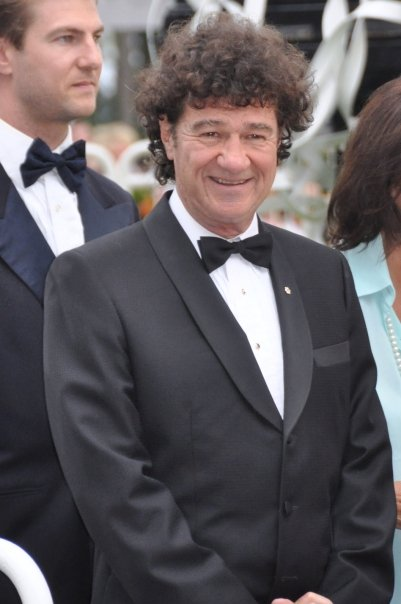
Charlebois at the 2009 Cannes Film Festival.

- 1965 – Volume 1
- 1966 – Volume 2
- 1967 – Demain l'hiver...
- 1968 – Robert Charlebois avec Louise Forestier
- 1969 – Québec Love
- 1971 – Un gars ben ordinaire
- 1971 – Le Mont Athos
- 1972 – Fu Man Chu (aka Charlebois) (#51 CAN)(single Conception was #83)
- 1973 – Solidaritude
- 1974 – Je rêve à Rio
- 1976 – Longue Distance
- 1977 – Swing Charlebois Swing (featuring guitar by Frank Zappa on Petroleum)
- 1979 – Solide
- 1981 – Heureux en amour?
- 1983 – J't'aime comme un fou
- 1985 – Super Position
- 1988 – Dense
- 1992 – Immensément
- 1996 – Le Chanteur masqué
- 2001 – Doux Sauvage
- 2010 – Tout est bien
