= Emmanuëlle =

Canadian singer (1942–2024)

- Born: Ginette Filion; 18 October 1942; Montreal, Quebec, Canada
- Died: 3 March 2024 (aged 81); Saint-Jérôme, Quebec, Canada
- Education: École de musique Vincent-d'Indy
- Occupation: Singer

Ginette Filion (18 October 1942 – 3 March 2024), better known by her stage name Emmanuëlle, was a Canadian singer.

== Biography ==
Born in Montreal on 18 October 1942, Emmanuëlle studied at the École de musique Vincent-d'Indy with the aim of being a classical singer. However, a 1972 meeting with lyricist Luc Plamondon changed her perspective. She was under contract with Capitol Records from 1972 to 1973, SOL7 Records from 1973 to 1977, Disques Solo from 1978 to 1979, and Disques Mérite from 1993 to 2004.

Emmanuëlle was also the official spokesperson for La Baie in the 1970s.

Emmanuëlle died in Saint-Jerome, Quebec from Alzheimer's disease on 3 March 2024, at the age of 81.

== Discography ==
=== Albums ===
- Chansons du Québec (1972)
- Le monde à l'envers (1973)
- Chanter pour vivre (1974)
- Pas tout de suite, pas maintenant – Un homme, une femme et la vérité (1975)
- Je vous aime (1978)
- Une soirée au cabaret avec Emmanuëlle (1980)

=== Compilations ===
- La double compilation d’Emmanuëlle (1976)
- Rétrospective (1993)
- Et c’est pas fini (1999)
- Les plus belles chansons (2010)
