= Jacques Godbout =

Canadian novelist, essayist, children's writer, journalist, filmmaker and poet

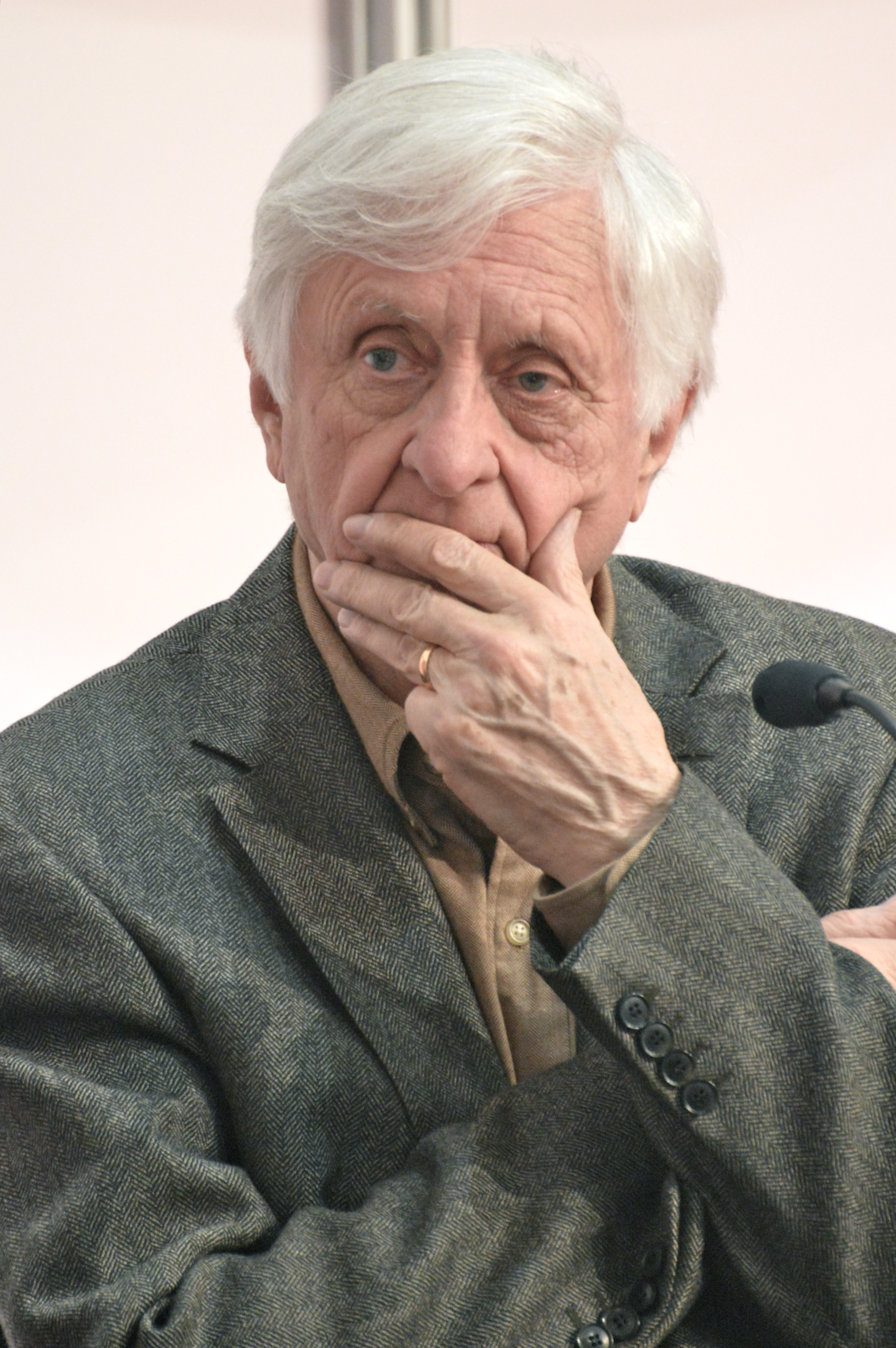
- Jacques Godbout in 2014
- Born: November 27, 1933 (age 92); Montreal, Quebec, Canada
- Occupations: Film director Screenwriter; Author; Poet
- Years active: 1958–present

Jacques Godbout, OC, CQ (born November 27, 1933) is a Canadian novelist, essayist, children's writer, journalist, filmmaker and poet. By his own admission a bit of a dabbler (touche-à-tout), Godbout has become one of the most important writers of his generation, with a major influence on post-1960 Quebec intellectual life.

== Biography ==
Born in Montreal, Quebec, after studies at Collège Jean-de-Brébeuf and the Université de Montréal, Godbout taught French in Ethiopia before joining the National Film Board of Canada (NFB) as producer and scriptwriter in 1958.

He was active during Quebec's Quiet Revolution during which time he wrote a number of penetrating essays, the most important of which were collected in Le Réformiste (1975) and Le Murmure marchand (1984).

Godbout was a co-founder of Liberté (1959), the Mouvement laïque de la langue française (1962) and the Union des écrivains Québécois (1977). Godbout's films include four full-length features and more than 15 documentaries. He has also written nine novels for adults and two for children. Godbout currently writes a monthly column in the Quebec newsmagazine L'actualité.

Godbout lives in Outremont, a former city now in Montreal. He is the grand-nephew of former Quebec Premier Adélard Godbout.

Godbout's novel Une histoire américaine (1986) was chosen for inclusion in the French version of Canada Reads, broadcast on Radio-Canada in 2004, where it was championed by trade-union activist and professor Gérald Larose.

== Awards and recognition ==
On June 30, 2016, Godbout was made an Officer of the Order of Canada by Governor General David Johnston for "his significant contributions to the literary arts and critical thinking for more than half a century."

His other awards and recognition include:

- Chevalier of the National Order of Quebec
- Ludger-Duvernay Prize (1973)
- Awarded the 2007 Prix Maurice Genevoix for La concierge du Panthéon
- Nominated for a 1997 Governor General's Award for children's literature for Une leçon de chasse
- Winner of the Quebec government's Prix Athanase-David in 1985
- Prix Belgique-Canada (1978)
- Winner of the 1967 Governor General's Award for Fiction for Salut Galarneau

In 1973 Joseph Pivato published "Nouveau Roman Canadien" in Canadian Literature No. 58, the first English language analysis of Le couteau sur la table which he claims changed his whole career as a writer who has published fourteen books by 2023.

== Bibliography ==
=== Poetry ===
- Carton pâte — 1956
- Les pavés secs — 1958
- C'est la chaude loi des hommes — 1960
- La grande muraille de Chine — 1969
- Souvenirs Shop — poèmes et proses — 1984

=== Fiction ===
- L'aquarium — 1962
- La couteau sur la table — 1965 (translated into English as The Knife on The Table)
- Salut Galarneau! — 1967 (winner of the 1967 Governor General's Award for Fiction; translated into English as Hail Galarneau!)
- D'amour P.Q. — 1972
- L'isle au dragon — 1976 (translated into English as Dragon Island)
- Les têtes à Papineau — 1981
- Une histoire américaine — 1986
- Le temps des Galarneau — 1993
- Opération Rimbaud — 1999

=== Non-fiction ===
- Le réformiste: textes tranquilles — 1975
- Le murmure marchand — 1984
- Abécédaire Québécois — 1988
- L'écran du bonheur — 1990
- L'écrivain de province: journal 1981–1990 — 1991
- L'ésprit du don — 1993
- Le sort de l'Amérique — 1997

=== Children's literature ===
- Une leçon de chasse — 1997 (nominated for a Governor General's Award)
- Mes petites fesses — 1998

== Filmography ==
=== Fiction ===
- YUL 871 - 1966
- Kid Sentiment - 1967
- IXE-13 - 1971
- The Mob (La Gammick) - 1974

=== Documentaries ===
- À St-Henri le cinq septembre (narration)
- Les Administrateurs
- L'Affaire Norman William
- Aimez-vous les chiens?
- Alias Will James
- Anglo Blues
- Anne Hébert, 1916–2000
- Bientôt Noâl
- Les Canadiens
- Cinéma vérité : le moment décisif
- Comme en Californie
- Derrière l'image
- Deux épisodes dans la vie d'Hubert Aquin
- Les Dieux
- Distorsions
- L'École des peintres
- En dernier recours
- L'Extràme-Nord canadien
- Fabienne sans son Jules
- Feu l'objectivité
- Les héritiers du mouton noir
- Huit témoins
- L'Invasion (1775–1975)
- L'Invention du stress
- Jacques de Tonnancour, une interview
- Les Maîtres-sondeurs
- Marée au Ghana
- Le monde va nous prendre pour des sauvages
- The Black Sheep (Le Mouton noir)
- Paul-Émile Borduas (1905–1960)
- Les Petits Arpents
- Pour l'amour du stress
- Pour quelques arpents de neige
- Le Prospecteur et la Technique
- Quand vient l'été
- Québec Soft (La musique adoucit les moeurs)
- Rose et Landry
- Le Sort de l'Amérique
- Tàtes blanches
- Le Tir au fusil
- Traitor or Patriot (Traître ou Patriote)
- Travail d'équipe et Recherches agricoles
- Les "Troubbes" de Johnny
- Un monologue Nord-Sud
- Une Leçon de chasse
- Vivre sa ville
- Les Vrais Cousins

== See also ==
- List of Quebec writers
- List of Quebec film directors
- List of Quebec movies
- Literature of Quebec
- Culture of Quebec
- Cinema of Quebec
