= Denis Héroux =

Canadian film director and producer (1940–2015)

Denis Héroux OC
- Born: 15 July 1940; Montreal, Quebec, Canada
- Died: 10 December 2015 (aged 75); Montreal, Quebec, Canada
- Occupations: Film director; Film producer
- Years active: 1962 - 2000
- Spouse: Justine Héroux

Denis Héroux, OC (French: [dəni eʁu]; 15 July 1940 – 10 December 2015) was a Canadian film director and producer.

== Biography ==
Born in Montreal, Quebec, he was the older brother of prolific Quebec film and television producer Claude Héroux.

Héroux wanted to become a teacher when he collaborated with Denys Arcand and Stéphane Venne on the 1962 film about life as a student, Alone or with Others (Seul ou avec d’autres). That year he went on to become a teacher and for the next six years, in addition to teaching, he also wrote two history books and continued to direct.

By the late 1960s Héroux had become one of the most successful independent filmmakers with hits like 1968's Valérie and Here and Now (L'Initiation) in 1970. In 1975, riding the success of several other popular features he directed, such as the swashbuckler Quelques arpents de neige (1973), he became involved in co-production projects and big-budget Quebec features as partner with his wife Justine Héroux in Cinévidéo. He went on to helm international co-productions with films such as Jacques Brel Is Alive and Well and Living in Paris (1975), Atlantic City (1980), and Quest for Fire (1981). He was a co-founder of Alliance Films, a company he left in the late eighties.

Héroux was a Genie Award nominee as producer of the Best Picture finalist The Plouffe Family (Les Plouffe) at the 3rd Genie Awards in 1981, and won as producer of The Bay Boy at the 6th Genie Awards in 1985. He also received an Oscar nomination for Best Picture for Atlantic City.

Héroux was a member of the jury at the 31st Berlin International Film Festival in 1981.

In 1983, Héroux was made an Officer of the Order of Canada.

Héroux died on December 10, 2015, at the age of 75.

== Filmography ==
=== Features ===
- Alone or With Others (Seul ou avec d'autres) - 1962, co-directed with Denys Arcand and Stéphane Venne
- Over My Head (Jusqu'au cou) - 1964
- No Holiday for Idols (Pas de vacances pour les idoles) - 1965
- Valérie - 1968
- Here and Now (L'Initiation) - 1969
- The Awakening (L'amour humain) - 1970
- Les Défroqués - 1971
- Seven Times a Day (7 fois... par jour) - 1971
- The Rebels (Quelques arpents de neige) - 1972
- Enuff Is Enuff (J'ai mon voyage!) - 1973
- There's Always a Way to Find a Way (Y'a toujours moyen de moyenner!) - 1973
- Jacques Brel is Alive and Well and Living in Paris - 1974
- Don't Push It (Pousse mais pousse égal) - 1975
- Born for Hell - 1976
- The Uncanny - 1977
- The Blood of Others - 1984

=== Other work ===
- Cent ans déjà (Documentary short, 1967)
- Mais où sont les Anglais d'antan? (Documentary, 1967)
- Un ville à vivre (Documentary short, 1967)
- Les Acadiens (TV episode of the series La feuille d'érable, 1971)
- La fille du Roy (TV episode of the series La feuille d'érable, 1971)
- Bureau des inventeurs (Documentary short, 1971)
- Transports et communications (Documentary short, 1971)
- Un enfant comme les autres (Documentary, 1972)
- Le Ministère de l'Industrie et du Commerce du Canada (Short film, 1972)
- Le Ministère des Transports du Canada (Short film, 1972)
- La vallée-jardin (Short film Co-Directed with Justine Héroux, 1974)
- The Strikebreaker (TV episode of the series Sidestreet, 1975)
- Heathcliff and Cats & Co (TV series co-producer 1984)
- M. A. S. K (TV series co-producer Season 1 1985)
