= Isabelle Pierre =

Canadian singer, illustrator, and comic artist

- Born: Nicole Lapointe; June 11, 1936 (age 89); Rouyn-Noranda, Quebec, Canada
- Genres: Chanson québécoise, pop
- Occupations: Singer, radio host, illustrator, comic artist
- Years active: 1963–1974
- Labels: Disques Sélect, Barclay Canada

Isabelle Pierre (born Nicole Lapointe; June 11, 1936) is a Canadian singer, radio host, and visual artist from Quebec. She is best known for her 1971 song "Le temps est bon", written by Stéphane Venne as the theme for the film The Men (Les mâles). The song became her signature recording and later experienced renewed popularity in France during the 2010s through remixes, film use, and renewed circulation.

== Career ==
Lapointe was educated in fine arts in Montreal, studying at the École des beaux-arts de Montréal between 1955 and 1959. During this period, she worked as an illustrator and contributed drawings and comic strips to youth and cultural publications, including magazines associated with Catholic student movements in Quebec.

She began her music career in 1963, performing in boîtes à chansons and taking part in song competitions. Her debut album was released in 1965 and featured texts by novelist Louise Maheux-Forcier, as well as early collaborations with songwriter Stéphane Venne. The album brought her wider recognition within the Quebec music scene.

During the late 1960s and early 1970s, Pierre became one of the prominent female voices of Quebec popular song. She recorded a series of successful singles written and composed by Venne, including "Heureuse", "Si tu m’aimes", "La paix", and "Les enfants de l’avenir". In 1971, "Le temps est bon" was released as the theme song for The Men (Les mâles) and became her most widely known recording.

She performed frequently during this period, appearing in television variety programs and giving live recitals, including performances at the Place des Arts in Montreal. She also represented Radio-Canada at international festivals, including the Festival de Spa in Belgium.

== Later life and legacy ==
After releasing a compilation album in 1973, Pierre gradually withdrew from the music industry. Her final studio album, J’m’appelle Nicole Lapointe, was released in 1974 and marked her return to her birth name. The album received limited promotion and did not achieve the commercial success of her earlier recordings.

She did not resume a public career as a performer but later approved the reissue of her recordings on compact disc in the late 1990s and early 2000s. Her work has since been reassessed, particularly in light of her parallel career as an illustrator and early contributor to Quebec comic art.

"Le temps est bon" experienced renewed attention beginning in the late 2010s, especially in France, following a remix by the French collective Bon Entendeur and its use in films and television series. This resurgence introduced Pierre’s work to a new international audience and reinforced her place in the history of Quebec popular music.

== Personal life ==
She married Quebec painter Robert Wolfe in 1961; the couple divorced in 1970. She is the aunt of actress Anne-Marie Cadieux and photographer Geneviève Cadieux.

== Discography ==
=== Studio albums ===
- Isabelle Pierre, Volume 1 (1965)
- Heureuse (1971)
- Le temps est bon (1972)
- J’m’appelle Nicole Lapointe (1974)

=== Compilations ===
- Ballade pour Sergio Leone – Les grands succès d’Isabelle Pierre (1973)
- Les refrains d’abord (1997)
- Collection Portrait (1997)
- Isabelle Pierre (2004)

== Awards ==
- 2024: Albert-Chartier Prize (Festival Québec BD)
