= Comfort and Indifference =

- French: Le confort et l'indifférence
- Directed by: Denys Arcand
- Produced by: Jean Dansereau; Roger Frappier
- Starring: Jean-Pierre Ronfard; Raymond Barre; Pierre Brodeur; Monique Bégin
- Cinematography: Alain Dostie
- Edited by: Pierre Bernier
- Release date: 7 February 1982
- Running time: 109 minutes
- Country: Canada
- Language: French
- Budget: $483,675

Comfort and Indifference (French: Le confort et l'indifférence) is a 1982 documentary film by Denys Arcand, offering an analysis of the 1980 Quebec referendum, in which "sovereignty-association" was defeated as a first step to eventual secession from Canada. The film takes the position that the referendum result was a failure of courage and that the Québécois were numbed by prosperity and the explicitly Machiavellian manipulations of federalist leaders.

== Production ==
The film had a budget of $483,675 (equivalent to $1,604,433 in 2025).

== Works cited ==
- Evans, Gary (1991). In the National Interest: A Chronicle of the National Film Board of Canada from 1949 to 1989. University of Toronto Press. ISBN 0802027849.
