= Denys Arcand =

Canadian film director (born 1941)

Denys Arcand CC GOQ
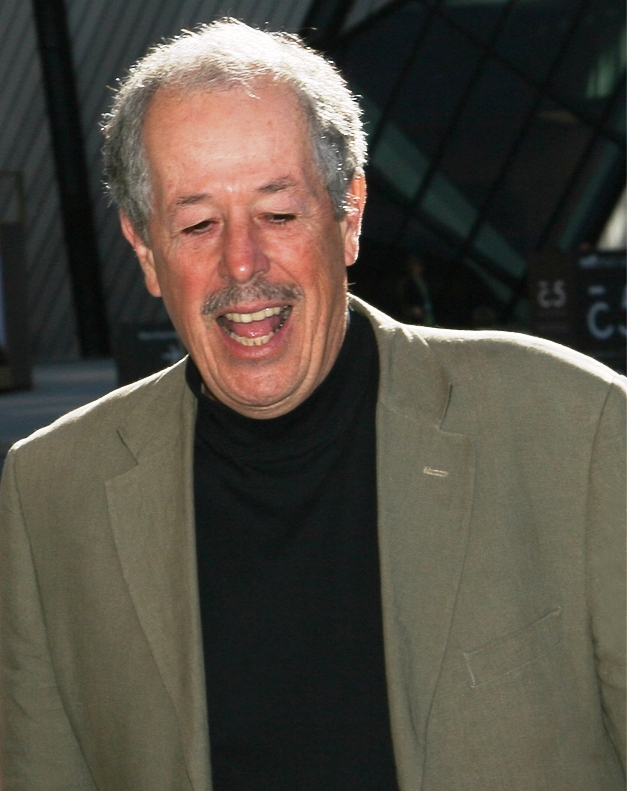
- Arcand at the 2007 Toronto International Film Festival
- Born: Georges-Henri Denys Arcand; June 25, 1941 (age 85); Deschambault, Quebec, Canada
- Education: Université de Montréal
- Occupations: Film director, screenwriter, film producer
- Years active: 1962–present
- Spouse: Denise Robert
- Relatives: Bernard Arcand (brother); Gabriel Arcand (brother); Adrien Arcand (grand-uncle)
- Awards: César Award for Best Director; 2003 The Barbarian Invasions; César Award for Best Film; 2003 The Barbarian Invasions; César Award for Best Original Screenplay or Adaptation; 2003 The Barbarian Invasions; Genie Award for Best Direction; 1986 The Decline of the American Empire; 1989 Jesus of Montreal; 2003 The Barbarian Invasions; Genie Award for Best Original Screenplay; 1986 The Decline of the American Empire; 1989 Jesus of Montreal; 2003 The Barbarian Invasions

Georges-Henri Denys Arcand CC GOQ RCA (French: [dəni aʁkɑ̃]; born June 25, 1941) is a Canadian filmmaker. During his four decades career, he became one of the most internationally-recognized directors from Quebec, earning widespread acclaim and numerous accolades for his "intensely personal, challenging, and intellectual films."

His film The Barbarian Invasions won the Academy Award for Best Foreign Language Film in 2004. His films have also been nominated three further times, including two nominations in the same category for The Decline of the American Empire in 1986 and Jesus of Montreal in 1989, becoming the only French-Canadian director in history whose films have received this number of nominations and, subsequently, to have a film win the award. For The Barbarian Invasions, he received an Academy Award nomination for Best Original Screenplay, losing to Sofia Coppola for Lost in Translation.

Arcand has also won several awards from the Cannes Film Festival, including the Best Screenplay Award, the Jury Prize, and many other prestigious awards worldwide. He won three César Awards in 2004 for The Barbarian Invasions: Best Director, Best Original Screenplay or Adaptation and Best Film, the only Canadian director to have done so. He is a member of the Royal Canadian Academy of Arts, and a Commander of the French Ordre des Arts et des Lettres.

== Early life and education ==
Arcand was born in Deschambault, Quebec, Canada. He grew up in a devoutly Roman Catholic home in a village about 40 km southwest of Quebec City. He attended Jesuit school for nine years. Entering his teen years, the family moved to Montreal and although he dreamed about being a professional tennis player, while studying for a master's degree in history at the Université de Montréal he became involved in film making, which gave him a new sense of direction. In this era he was involved in several student film projects in collaboration with classmates Denis Héroux and Stéphane Venne, including À l'est d'Eaton, Alone or with Others (Seul ou avec d'autres) and Over My Head (Jusqu'au cou).

== Career ==
In 1963, he joined the National Film Board of Canada where he produced several award-winning documentaries in his native French language. A social activist, he made a feature-length documentary in 1970 titled Cotton Mill, Treadmill (On est au coton) that showed the exploitation of textile workers. The film caused an uproar that resulted in it not being distributed publicly for several years. Arcand received such publicity that it gave his fledgling career a great boost. He also worked on some television series, notably Duplessis, a historical work he wrote (but did not direct) about Premier Maurice Duplessis.

During the early part of the 1970s, Arcand produced a number of feature films that received critical acclaim. Arcand returned to directing documentaries and did no work for television. In 1982, his documentary, Comfort and Indifference (Le confort et l'indifférence) won the Prix Luc-Perreault from the Quebec Film Critics' Association. In 1986 he wrote and directed what was until then the highest-grossing film in Quebec (and Canadian) history, The Decline of the American Empire (Le Déclin de l'empire américain).

At the Canadian Genie Awards, it captured best film, best director, and best writer of an original screenplay. It also won the "International Critics Prize" at the Cannes Film Festival and became the first Canadian feature film nominated for an Academy Award for Best Foreign Language Film. Three years later Arcand repeated this award-garnering performance with his widely acclaimed 1989 film Jesus of Montreal (Jésus de Montréal) winning the same three Genie awards, plus the Jury Prize at Cannes. The movie earned him a second Academy Award nomination, becoming the first Canadian director to accomplish this achievement.

Arcand produced and directed his first English language film in 1993, titled Love and Human Remains, and did so again in 2000, with the film Stardom, which opened the Toronto International Film Festival. He then spent two years writing the script for what many claim is his finest piece of cinematic writing to date, The Barbarian Invasions (Les invasions barbares). Released in 2003, the film won Arcand the Best Screenplay Award at the Cannes Film Festival, was nominated for a Golden Globe Award as Best Foreign Language Film and won the Academy Award for Best Foreign Language Film. In addition, Denys Arcand was nominated for an Academy Award for Writing Original Screenplay. The Barbarian Invasions won France's 2004 César Award for Best Film, Best Director, and Best Original Screenplay or Adaptation.

Arcand's film Days of Darkness (L'Âge des ténèbres) was chosen to close the 2007 Cannes Film Festival. The press opening was subdued and the subsequent reviews were mixed. Following this, he took a seven-year hiatus from feature film directing; he returned in 2014 with the film Le règne de la beauté.

== Awards and honours ==
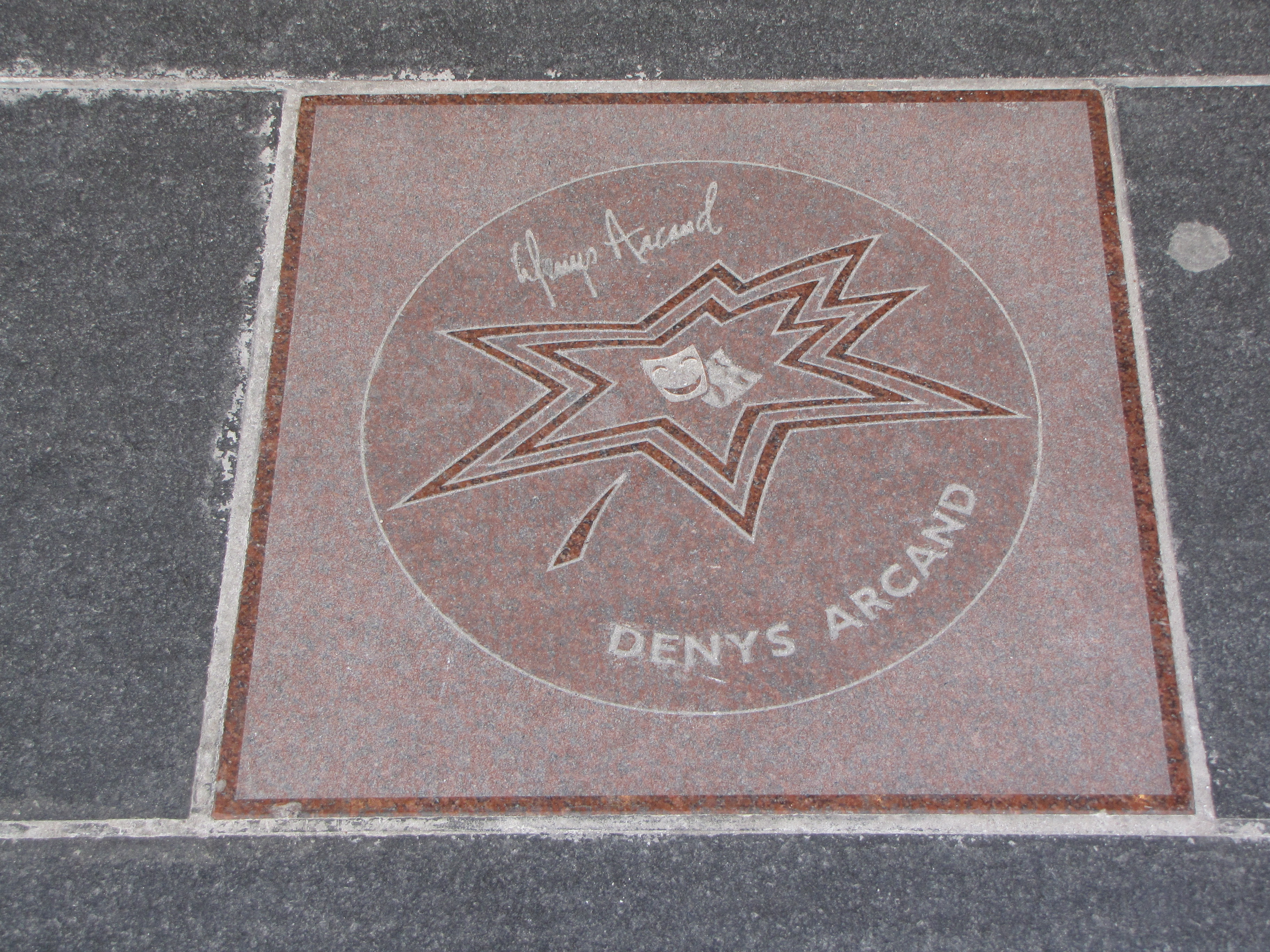
Arcand's star on Canada's Walk of Fame.

In 1988, he was made an Officer of the Order of Canada and was promoted to Companion in 2005. In 1990 the Government of France awarded him the Legion of Honour. He finally earned from his home province one of its highest distinctions, the title of Knight of the National Order of Quebec, in 1990.

In 1995, Arcand received a Governor General's Performing Arts Award for Lifetime Artistic Achievement. In February 2004, the government of France named Denys Arcand a Commander of L'Ordre des Arts et des Lettres, that nation's highest cultural honour. In 2004, Arcand was also inducted into Canada's Walk of Fame.

He is a member of the Royal Canadian Academy of Arts.

In 2023, he was named the recipient of a Lifetime Achievement Award from the Directors Guild of Canada.

Award	Date of ceremony	Category	Nominated work	Result
Academy Awards	February 29, 2004	Academy Award for Best Foreign Language Film	The Barbarian Invasions	Accepted
Academy Awards	February 29, 2004	Best Original Screenplay	The Barbarian Invasions	Nominated
BAFTA Awards	March 17, 1991	Best Film Not in the English Language	Jesus of Montreal	Nominated
BAFTA Awards	February 15, 2004	Best Film Not in the English Language	The Barbarian Invasions	Nominated
BAFTA Awards	February 15, 2004	Best Original Screenplay	The Barbarian Invasions	Nominated
Cannes Film Festival	May 8–19, 1986	FIPRESCI Prize	The Decline of the American Empire	Won
Cannes Film Festival	May 11–23, 1989	Jury Prize	Jesus of Montreal	Won
Cannes Film Festival	May 11–23, 1989	Prize of the Ecumenical Jury	Jesus of Montreal	Won
Cannes Film Festival	May 11–23, 1989	Palme d'Or	Jesus of Montreal	Nominated
Cannes Film Festival	May 14–25, 2003	Palme d'Or	The Barbarian Invasions	Nominated
Cannes Film Festival	May 14–25, 2003	Best Screenplay	The Barbarian Invasions	Won
César Awards	February 21, 2004	Best Film	The Barbarian Invasions	Won
César Awards	February 21, 2004	Best Director	The Barbarian Invasions	Won
César Awards	February 21, 2004	Best Original Screenplay or Adaptation	The Barbarian Invasions	Won
Directors Guild of Canada Awards	2004	Best Direction in a Feature Film	The Barbarian Invasions	Won
Directors Guild of Canada Awards	2023	Lifetime Achievement Award	Himself	Honored
Genie Awards	May 15, 1965	Best Films for Children	Samuel de Champlain: Québec 1603	Won
Genie Awards	October 12, 1973	Best Screenplay	Réjeanne Padovani	Won
Genie Awards	March 18, 1987	Best Direction	The Decline of the American Empire	Won
Genie Awards	March 18, 1987	Best Original Screenplay	The Decline of the American Empire	Won
Genie Awards	March 20, 1990	Best Original Screenplay	Jesus of Montreal	Won
Genie Awards	March 20, 1990	Best Direction	Jesus of Montreal	Won
Genie Awards	2001	Best Screenplay	Stardom	Nominated
Genie Awards	May 1, 2004	Best Direction	The Barbarian Invasions	Won
Genie Awards	May 1, 2004	Best Original Screenplay	The Barbarian Invasions	Won
Genie Awards	March 3, 2008	Best Original Screenplay	Days of Darkness	Nominated
Genie Awards	March 3, 2008	Best Direction	Days of Darkness	Nominated
Lumière Awards	February 17, 2004	Best French-Language Film	The Barbarian Invasions	Won
Quebec Cinema Awards	February 22, 2004	Best Director	The Barbarian Invasions	Won
Quebec Cinema Awards	February 22, 2004	Best Screenplay	The Barbarian Invasions	Won
Quebec Cinema Awards	February 22, 2004	Most Successful Film Outside Quebec	The Barbarian Invasions	Won
Quebec Cinema Awards	March 9, 2008	Best Director	Days of Darkness	Nominated
Quebec Cinema Awards	March 9, 2008	Best Screenplay	Days of Darkness	Nominated
Quebec Cinema Awards	June 2, 2019	Most Successful Film Outside Quebec	The Fall of the American Empire	Won
Quebec Cinema Awards	June 2, 2019	Michel-Côté Public Prize	The Fall of the American Empire	Nominated
Quebec Cinema Awards	December 8, 2024	Michel-Côté Public Prize	Testament	Nominated
Toronto International Film Festival	September 4–13, 1986	People's Choice Award	The Decline of the American Empire	Won
Toronto International Film Festival	September 4–13, 1986	Best Canadian Film	The Decline of the American Empire	Won
Toronto International Film Festival	September 7–16, 1989	International Critics' Award	Jesus of Montreal	Won
Toronto International Film Festival	September 4– 13, 2003	Best Canadian Film	The Barbarian Invasions	Won
Toronto International Film Festival	September 6–16, 2018	Best Canadian Film	The Fall of the American Empire	Nominated
Writers Guild of Canada Awards	2001	WGC Screenwriting Award	Stardom	Won

== Personal life ==
Arcand is a lapsed Catholic. Married a second time, neither Arcand nor Denise Robert, his producer/wife, has had children. He was 55 years old when they adopted an orphaned baby boy from China named Carter. His brother Bernard Arcand (1945–2009) was a professor of anthropology, and his youngest brother Gabriel Arcand (b. 1949) is a noted Canadian actor. His great-uncle, Adrien Arcand (1899-1967), was a notorious far-right politician.

== Filmography ==
=== Director ===
- À l'est d'Eaton - 1959, short film co-directed with Stéphane Venne
- Alone or With Others (Seul ou avec d'autres) - 1962, co-directed with Denis Héroux and Stéphane Venne
- Dirty Money (La maudite galette) - 1972
- Réjeanne Padovani - 1973
- Gina - 1975
- Empire, Inc. - 1983, TV miniseries codirected with Douglas Jackson
- The Crime of Ovide Plouffe (Le Crime d'Ovide Plouffe) - 1984
- The Decline of the American Empire (Le Déclin de l'empire américain) - 1986
- Jesus of Montreal (Jésus de Montréal) - 1989
- Les lettres de la religieuse portugaise - 1991, TV movie
- Montreal Stories - 1992, segment "Vue d'ailleurs"
- Love and Human Remains - 1993
- Poverty and Other Delights (Joyeux Calvaire) - 1996
- Stardom - 2000
- The Barbarian Invasions (Les invasions barbares) - 2003
- Days of Darkness (L'Âge des ténèbres) - 2007
- An Eye for Beauty (Le règne de la beauté) - 2014
- The Fall of the American Empire (La chute de l'empire américain) - 2018
- Testament - 2023

=== Documentaries ===
- Champlain - 1964, short film
- Québec 1603 - Samuel de Champlain - 1964, short film
- Les Montréalistes - 1965, short film
- Montréal, un jour d'été - 1965, short film
- La route de l'Ouest - 1965, short film
- Volleyball - 1966, short film
- Parcs atlantiques - 1967, short film
- Quebec: Duplessis and After (Québec : Duplessis et après...) - 1972
- La lutte des travailleurs d'hôpitaux - 1976, short film
- Cotton Mill, Treadmill (On est au coton) - 1976 (made 1970 but withheld from release)
- Comfort and Indifference (Le confort et l'indifférence) - 1982

=== Acting ===
- It Isn't Jacques Cartier's Fault (C'est pas la faute à Jacques Cartier) - 1968
- Nominingue... depuis qu'il existe - 1968
- My Eye (Mon oeil) - 1971
- Dirty Money (La maudite galette) - 1972
- Réjeanne Padovani - 1973
- Pigs Are Seldom Clean (On n'engraisse pas les cochons à l'eau claire) - 1973
- Normande (La Tête de Normande St-Onge) - 1975
- Night Zoo (Un zoo la nuit) - 1987
- Jesus of Montreal (Jésus de Montréal) - 1989
- Montreal Stories (Montréal vu par...) - 1991
- Léolo - 1992
- Un gars, une fille - 2000
- The Barbarian Invasions (Les Invasions barbares) - 2003
- Tideline - 2004
- Idole instantanée - 2005
- Les Bougon - 2004-06
- Days of Darkness (L'Âge des ténèbres) - 2007
- Barney's Version - 2010
- Adam & Ève - 2012
- Kiss Me Like a Lover (Embrasse-moi comme tu m'aimes) - 2016
- Les pêcheurs - 2016, TV series
