= 42nd Locarno Film Festival =

Film festival in Locarno, Switzerland

- Opening film: Gone With The Wind directed by Victor Fleming
- Closing film: Mystery Train directed by Jim Jarmusch
- Location: Locarno, Switzerland
- Founded: 1946
- Awards: Golden Leopard: Why Has Bodhi-Dharma Left for the East? directed by Yong-Kyun Bae
- Artistic director: David Strieff
- Festival date: Opening: 3 August 1989; Closing: 13 August 1989
- Website: LFF

Locarno Film Festival
- 43rd 41st

The 42nd Locarno Film Festival was held from 3 to 13 August 1989 in Locarno, Switzerland. The opening film of the festival was Gone With The Wind. Attendance at the Piazza Grande, the open-air theater, reached a new record high with 8,900 tickets sold for the closing film Jim Jarmusch's Mystery Train. Over 100,000 people attended the festival.

A retrospective of the films of Preston Sturges also was a hit with audiences, especially film professionals, and film historian Donald Spotto along with Sturges' widow, Sandy Sturges, both attended the festival. Three episodes of Krzysztof Kieślowski's Dekalog were also crowd favorites with the festival having to turn away crowds every night.

Variety reporter, Edna Fairaru remarked that this year showed the importance of festival selection as the film Why Has Bodhi-Dharma Left for the East?, which experienced walk-outs at the Cannes film festival, was loved at Locarno by audiences and critics alike when it won top prize.

The Golden Leopard, the festival's top prize, was awarded to Why Has Bodhi-Dharma Left for the East? directed by Yong-Kyun Bae.

== Jury ==
=== International Jury – Main Competition (Incomplete) ===
- Dominique Sanda, French actress
- Aleksandr Askoldov, Russian director

== Official Sections ==
The following films were screened in these sections:

=== International Competition ===
International Competition - Feature Films
Original Title	English Title	Director(s)	Year	Production Country
A Setima Letra		José Dias de Souza, Simao dos Reis	1989	Portugal
Affettuose Lontananze	Affectionate Distance	Sergio Rossi	1989	Italia
Chil-Su Oa Man-Su		Park Kwang-su	1988	South Korea
Denj Angela	Days Angela	Nikolaï Makarov, Sergueï Selianov	1989	Russia
Der Siebente Kontinent	The Seventh Continent	Michael Haneke	1989	Austria
Dharmaga Tongjoguro Kan Khadalgun?	Why Has Bodhi-Dharma Left for the East?	Bae Yong-kyun	1989	South Korea
Dreissig Jahre	Thirty Years	Christoph Schaub	1989	Switzerland
Estaciò Central		Josep Anton Salgot	1989	Spain
Khaneh-Ye Dust Kojast?	Where Is the Friend's House?	Abbas Kiarostami	1988	Iran
Kornblumenblau	Cereal	Leszek Wosiewicz	1988	Poland
Niupeng		Dai Sijie	1989	France, Germany
Piano Panier Ou La Recherche De L'Equateur	Piano Basket or the Search for Ecuador	Patricia Plattner	1989	Switzerland
Piravi		Shaji N. Karun	1988	India
Prisoners Of Inertia		Jeffrey Noyes Scher	1989	USA
Riding The Rails		Neil Hollander	1988	USA
Shadow Man		Piotr Andrejew	1988	Netherlands
The Top Of His Head		Peter Mettler	1989	Canada
Verfolgte Wege	Persecuted Paths	Uwe Janson	1988	Germany

=== Out of Competition (Fuori Concorso) ===
Out of Competition (Fuori Concorso)
Original Title	English Title	Director(s)	Year	Production Country
Ab, Bad, Khak	Water, Wind, Dust	Amir Naderi	1985	Iran
Abschied Vom Falschen Paradies	Farewell to the Wrong Paradise	Tevfik Baser	1988	Germany
Amori In Corso	Loves in Progress	Giuseppe Bertolucci	1988	Italia
Ariel		Aki Kaurismäki	1988	Finland
Arusi-Ye-Khuban		Mohsen Makhmalbaf	1989	Iran
Boulevards D'Afrique - Bac Ou Mariage	Boulevards d'Afrique - Bac or Wedding	Tam-Sir Doueb, Jean Rouch	1988	France
Caracas		Michael Schottenberg	1989	Austria
El Kaala	The Citadel	Mohamed Chouikh	1988	Algérie
El dorado		Géza Bereményi	1988	Hungary
Gone With The Wind		Victor Fleming	1939	USA
Gorod Zero	The City of Zero	Karen Chakhnazarov	1989	Russia
Krotki Film O Milosci	A Short Film About Love	Krzysztof Kieślowski	1988	Poland
La Bande Des Quatre	Gang of Four	Jacques Rivette	1988	France, Switzerland
Mentiras Piadosas	Love Lies	Arturo Ripstein	1988	Mexico
Mielött Befejezi Röptet A Denever	Before you Finish Flying the Denever	Péter Timar	1989	Hungary
Mystery Train		Jim Jarmusch	1989	USA
Nuovo Cinema Paradiso	Cinema Paradiso	Giuseppe Tornatore	1989	Italia
Rosa De Areia	Rose	Margarida Cordeiro, António Reis	1989	Portugal
Schwarze Sünde	Black Sin	Danièle Huillet, Jean-Marie Straub.	1989	France
Sex, Lies, and Videotape		Steven Soderbergh	1989	USA
Tennessee Nights		Nicolas Gessner	1989	USA, Switzerland
Une Histoire De Vent	A History of Wind	Joris Ivens, Marceline Loridan	1988	France
Yaaba		Idrissa Ouédraogo	1989	Burkina Faso, France

=== Special Sessions ===
Original Title	English Title	Director(s)	Year	Production Country
Dekalog, Dziesiec	Dekalog: Ten	Krzysztof Kieślowski	1988	Poland
Dekalog, Dziewiec	Dekalog: Nine	Krzysztof Kieślowski	1988	Poland
Dekalog, Jeden	Dekalog: One	Krzysztof Kieślowski	1988	Poland
Geister und Gäste	Ghosts and Guests	Isa Hesse-Rabinovitch	1989	Switzerland
Hamlet Goes Business		Aki Kaurismäki	1987	Finland
Richard III		Laurence Olivier	1955	Great Britain
RobbyKallePaul		Dani Levy	1988	Germany, Switzerland
Route One/Usa		Robert Kramer	1989	France
Ti Ho Incontrata Domani	I Met you Tomorrow	Pio Bordoni	1989	Switzerland
Varjoja Paratiisissa	Shadows in Paradise	Aki Kaurismäki	1987	Finland
Voglia Di Rock	Desire for Rock	Massimo Costa	1989	Italia

=== Tribute To - Hans Richter ===
Tribute To Hans Richter
Original Title	English Title	Director(s)	Year	Production Country
8 × 8: A Chess Sonata in 8 Movements		Hans Richter	1955	Germany
Alexandre Calder		Hans Richter	1963	Germany
Diagonal Symphony		Hans Richter	1921	Germany
Dreams That Money Can Buy		Hans Richter	1944	Germany
Everything Turns		Hans Richter	1929	Germany
Filmstudie	Film Study	Hans Richter	1926	Germany
Irilation		Hans Richter	1928	Germany
Race Symphony		Hans Richter	1928	Germany
Rythme 21	Rhythmus 21	Hans Richter	1921	Germany
Rythme 23	Rhythm 23	Hans Richter	1923	Germany
Twopence Magic		Hans Richter	1930	Germany
Vormittagsspuck	Mornings	Hans Richter	1928	Germany

=== African Week ===
Original Title	English Title	Director(s)	Year	Production Country
Baabu Banza	Cities	Mariama Hima	1985	Niger
Bal Poussière	Dancing in the Dust	Henri Duparc	1988	Ivory Coast
Camera D'Afrique	Africa Camera	Férid Boughedir	1983	Tunisia
Dunia	World	S. Pierre Yaméogo		Burkina Faso
Falaw	Palace	Mariama Hima	1985	Niger
Finye	The Wind	Souleymane Cissé	1982	Mali
Geedka Nolosha	The Tree of Life	Abdullah Mohammad Saad	1987	Somalia
Jom Ou L'Histoire D'Un Peuple	Jom or the Story of a People	Ababacar Samb Makharam	1981	Senegal
Le Neveu Du Peintre	The Painter's Nephew	Moustapha Dao	1989	Burkina Faso
Mortu Nega	Dead Denied	Flora Gomes	1988	Guinea Bissau
Parlons Grand-Mère	Let's Talk Grandmother	Djibril Diop Mambéty	1989	Senegal
Segu-Janjo	It's Segoo	Mambaye Coulibaly	1989	Mali
Touki-Bouki	TOUKI-BOUKKI	Djibril Diop Mambéty	1973	Senegal
Toukou	All Neck	Mariama Hima	1987	Niger
À Nous La Rue	To Us the Street	Moustapha Dao	1987	Burkina Faso

=== Look At Italian Cinema ===
Original Title	English Title	Director(s)	Year	Production Country
Barbablù Barbablù		Fabio Carpi	1989	Italia
Cavalli Si Nasce	Horses are Born	Sergio Staino	1989	Italia
Ladri Di Saponette	Soap Thieves	Maurizio Nichetti	1988	Italia
Maicol		Mario Brenta	1988	Italia
Mignon È Partita	Mignon Started	Francesca Archibugi	1988	Italia
Nostos - Il Ritorno	Nostos - The Return	Franco Piavoli	1989	Italia

=== Out of Program ===
Original Title	English Title	Director(s)	Production Country
Parcs	Parks	Douglas Beer	Switzerland
Zan Boko		Gaston Kaboré	Burkina Faso

=== Retrospective - Preston Sturges ===
Original Title	English Title	Director(s)	Year	Production Country
Christmas in July		Preston Sturges	1940	USA
Diamond Jim		A. Edward Sutherland	1935	USA
Easy Living		Mitchell Leisen	1937	USA
Hail the Conquering Hero		Preston Sturges	1944	USA
Les Carnets Du Major Thompson	The French, They Are a Funny Race	Preston Sturges	1955	France
Remember the Night		Mitchell Leisen	1940	USA
Sullivan's Travels		Preston Sturges	1941	USA
The Beautiful Blonde from Bashful Bend		Preston Sturges	1949	USA
The Big Pond		Hobart Henley	1930	USA
The Good Fairy		William Wyler	1935	USA
The Great McGinty		Preston Sturges	1940	USA
The Great Moment		Preston Sturges	1944	USA
The Lady Eve		Preston Sturges	1941	USA
The Miracle Of Morgan's Creek		Preston Sturges	1943	USA
The Palm Beach Story		Preston Sturges	1942	USA
The Power And The Gory		William K. Howard	1933	USA
The Sin Of Harold Diddlebock		Preston Sturges	1947	USA
Unfaithfully Yours		Preston Sturges	1948	USA

== Independent Sections ==
=== New Swiss Films ===
Swiss / Feature Films
Original Title	English Title	Director(s)	Year	Production Country
Bankomatt		Villi Hermann	1989	Switzerland, Italia
Der Wald	The Forest	Friedrich Kappeler	1988	Switzerland
Duende	Elf	Jean-Blaise Junod	1989	Switzerland, France
Georgette Meunier		Cyrille Rey, Tania Stöcklin	1989	Switzerland
Johnny Sturmgewehr	Johnny Assault Rifle	Ueli Mamin	1989	Switzerland
La Nuit De L'Eclusier	The Night of the L'Eclusier	Franz Rickenbach	1989	Switzerland
Lüzzas Walkman	Walkman	Christian Schocher	1989	Switzerland
Noch Ein Wunsch	Another Wish	Thomas Koerfer	1989	Switzerland
Pestalozzi's Mountain		Peter von Gunten	1989	Switzerland
Was Geht Mich Der Frühling An	What Does Spring Come to Me	Heinz Bütler	1988	Switzerland
Swiss / Short Films
Original title	English title	Director(s)	Year	Production country
Canal Lili		Martial Wannaz	1988	Switzerland
L'Île D'Amour	The Island of Love	Robert Bouvier	1989	Switzerland
La Nef	The Nave	Claude Champion	1988	Switzerland
Late Show		Robert Müller, Martin Stricker	1988	Switzerland
Most Tango		Anges Weber	1989	Switzerland
The Three Soldiers		Kamal Musale Musale	1988	Switzerland

== Official Awards ==
=== Official Jury International Competition ===
- Golden Leopard: Why Has Bodhi-Dharma Left for the East? directed by Yong-Kyun Bae
- Silver Leopard: Piravi directed by Shaji N. Karun
- Bronze Leopard: Where Is the Friend's House? directed by Abbas Kiarostami, The Seventh Continent directed by Michael Haneke
- Bronze Leopard (Best Actor): Adam Karnien in Kornblumenblau
- Special Mention, Official Jury: Niupeng directed by Dai Sijie

=== FIPRESCI Jury ===
- International Critics Award: Why Has Bodhi-Dharma Left for the East? directed by Yong-Kyun Bae
- Honorable Mention FIPRESCI: Where Is the Friend's House? directed by Abbas Kiarostami,

=== Ecumenical Jury ===
- Ecumenical Jury Prize: Why Has Bodhi-Dharma Left for the East? directed by Yong-Kyun Bae
- Ecumenical Jury special Mention: Where Is the Friend's House? directed by Abbas Kiarostami,

=== Youth Jury ===
- First Prize: Verfolgte Wege directed by Uwe Janson
- Second Prize: Why Has Bodhi-Dharma Left for the East? directed by Yong-Kyun Bae
- Third Prize: Chil-Su Oa Man-Su directed by Park Kwang-Su

=== Barclay Award Jury ===
- First prize, Barclay Award: Where Is the Friend's House? directed by Abbas Kiarostami,
- Second prize, Barclay Award: Why Has Bodhi-Dharma Left for the East? directed by Yong-Kyun Bae
