= Louis Robitaille =

Louis Robitaille may refer to:

- Louis Robitaille (dancer) (born 1957), Canadian ballet dancer and artistic director.
- Louis Robitaille (ice hockey) (born 1982), Canadian ice hockey forward.
- Louis Robitaille (politician) (1836–1888), Canadian politician.
