= La Menace =

- Directed by: Alain Corneau
- Screenplay by: Alain Corneau; Daniel Boulanger
- Story by: Alain Corneau; Daniel Boulanger
- Produced by: Jean-Pierre Martel; Léo L. Fuchs; Richard Hellman
- Starring: Yves Montand; Marie Dubois; Carole Laure; Jean-François Balmer
- Cinematography: Pierre-William Glenn
- Edited by: Henri Lanoë
- Music by: Gerry Mulligan
- Production companies: Les Productions du Daunou; Viaduc Productions; Citéca Productions; Canafox
- Distributed by: Parafrance
- Release dates: 21 September 1977 (France); 4 November 1977 (Canada)
- Running time: 117 minutes
- Countries: France; Canada
- Language: French
- Budget: 11 million francs

La Menace (lit. 'The Threat') is a 1977 film directed by Alain Corneau and starring Yves Montand, Carole Laure, and Marie Dubois.

== Plot ==
Henri Savin has managed a trucking company for his lover, Dominique Montlaur, for many years. Now he is planning to leave her for Julie Manet, the woman he has made pregnant, and Dominique is hysterical. She first threatens suicide, then shows up at a meeting of Henri and Julie. Dominique tries everything she can think of to break Henri and Julie apart, to no avail. Frustrated in her efforts, she jumps off a cliff and dies. Savin insists that he and Julie lie to the police about the encounter, although Dominique's death was a suicide and therefore they had no direct hand in it. Detective Waldeck investigates Dominique's death.

== Cast ==
The cast of La Menace is as follows:

- Yves Montand as Henri Savin
- Carole Laure as Julie Manet
- Marie Dubois as Dominique Montlaur
- Jean-François Balmer as Waldeck
- Marc Eyraud as Judge Baron
- Roger Muni as Waldeck's deputy
- Jacques Rispal as Paco
- Michel Ruhl as Leverrier, the lawyer
- Gabriel Gascon as Pannequin
- Martin Trévières as Maurice Belloc

== Production ==
=== Pre-production ===
Following the release of Police Python 357 (1976), Yves Montand agreed to work with director Alain Corneau again and the two agreed to shoot a film inspired by the assassination of François Renaud. They halted these plans when Yves Boisset's film Le Juge Fayard dit Le Shériff (1977) beat them to it.

This led Corneau and Boulanger, who he worked with on Police Python 357 to devise several stories until one developed in what would become La Menace. In the film, they made Montand a truck driver, due to his similar role Henri-Georges Clouzot's The Wages of Fear (1953). The film went under several titles during development including Flash-back, M..., and Les Violents (lit. 'The Violent Ones'). Coreneau said the film was inspired by Fritz Lang's Beyond a Resonable Doubt (1956).

Carole Laure was a Quebec actress who at the time had never acted in a French film before. She was cast after Corneau had seen her in Gilles Carle's Normande (1975) when it screened at the Cannes Film Festival.

While initially set to start filming in January 1977, the financial backing for La Menace was on hold due to financial problems. Les Productions du Daunoui replaced André Génovès's Films La Boétie. France Film, the Canadian co-producer also withdrew from the project leading to Canafox taking its place. The film was made with a budget of 11 million francs and was an international co-production between three Paris-based production companies (Les Productions du Daunou , Viaduc Productions, Citéca Productions) with 30% of funding coming from the Montreal-based Canafox.

=== Filming ===
Filming began in April 1977. It was first shot in Paris and then moved to Bordeaux and Médoc and ended in Canada on July 8.

== Release ==
La Menace was released in France on September 21, 1977 and had 1,346,966 spectators in France. It was released on November 4, 1977 in Canada.

== Reception ==
In French Thrillers of the 1970s: Volume I, Crime Films, the authors said that critics were divided on La Menace.
