= Robitaille =

Robitaille is a surname. Notable people with the surname include:

- Alice Robitaille (1923-2011), Canadian singer.
- Chick Robitaille (1879-1947), American Major League Baseball pitcher.
- Clément Robitaille (1873-1932), Liberal party member of the House of Commons of Canada.
- Damien Robitaille (born 1981), Canadian musician.
- Jean-Marc Robitaille (born 1955), mayor of Terrebonne, Quebec and a member of the House of Commons of Canada.
- Jeannot Robitaille (born 1953), Canadian archer who competed at the 1992 and 1996 Summer Olympics .
- JF Robitaille, Canadian singer-songwriter.
- Joseph Robitaille (1766-1854), Canadian politician.
- Lorenzo Robitaille (1882-1952), Canadian politician.
- Louis Robitaille (dancer) (born 1957), Canadian ballet dancer and artistic director.
- Louis Robitaille (ice hockey) (born 1982), head coach of Russian Hockey Team Omskie Krylia of the VHL and former Canadian professional ice hockey player.
- Louis Robitaille (politician) (1836-1888), Canadian politician and physician.
- Luc Robitaille (born 1966), Canadian ice hockey player, left wing for numerous teams, mainly for the Los Angeles Kings.
- Lucie Robitaille, Canadian casting director.
- Marc Robitaille (screenwriter), Canadian screenwriter, sportswriter and novelist.
- Marc Robitaille (ice hockey) (born 1976), Canadian former ice hockey player.
- Mike Robitaille (born 1948), Canadian ice hockey player, defenceman for, among other teams, the Buffalo Sabres, for which he currently serves as commentator.
- Nathan Robitaille, Canadian sound editor.
- Olivier Robitaille (1811-1896), Canadian mayor.
- Pat Robitaille (born 1986), Canadian folk rock musician.
- Patrice Robitaille (born 1974), Canadian actor and screenwriter.
- Paule Robitaille, Canadian politician.
- Pierrette Robitaille (born 1950), Canadian film and television actress.
- Randy Robitaille (born 1975), Canadian ice hockey player, centreman for numerous teams, formerly with the Ottawa Senators, currently playing in the KHL.
- Théodore Robitaille, (1834-1897), the fourth Lieutenant Governor of Quebec.
- Tobie Marier Robitaille, Canadian cinematographer.
- Tom Robitaille, American basketball player.

Fictional characters

- Daniel Robitaille, also known as [the] Candyman, a fictional character originally written by Clive Barker.
