= Donald Pilon (actor) =

Canadian actor

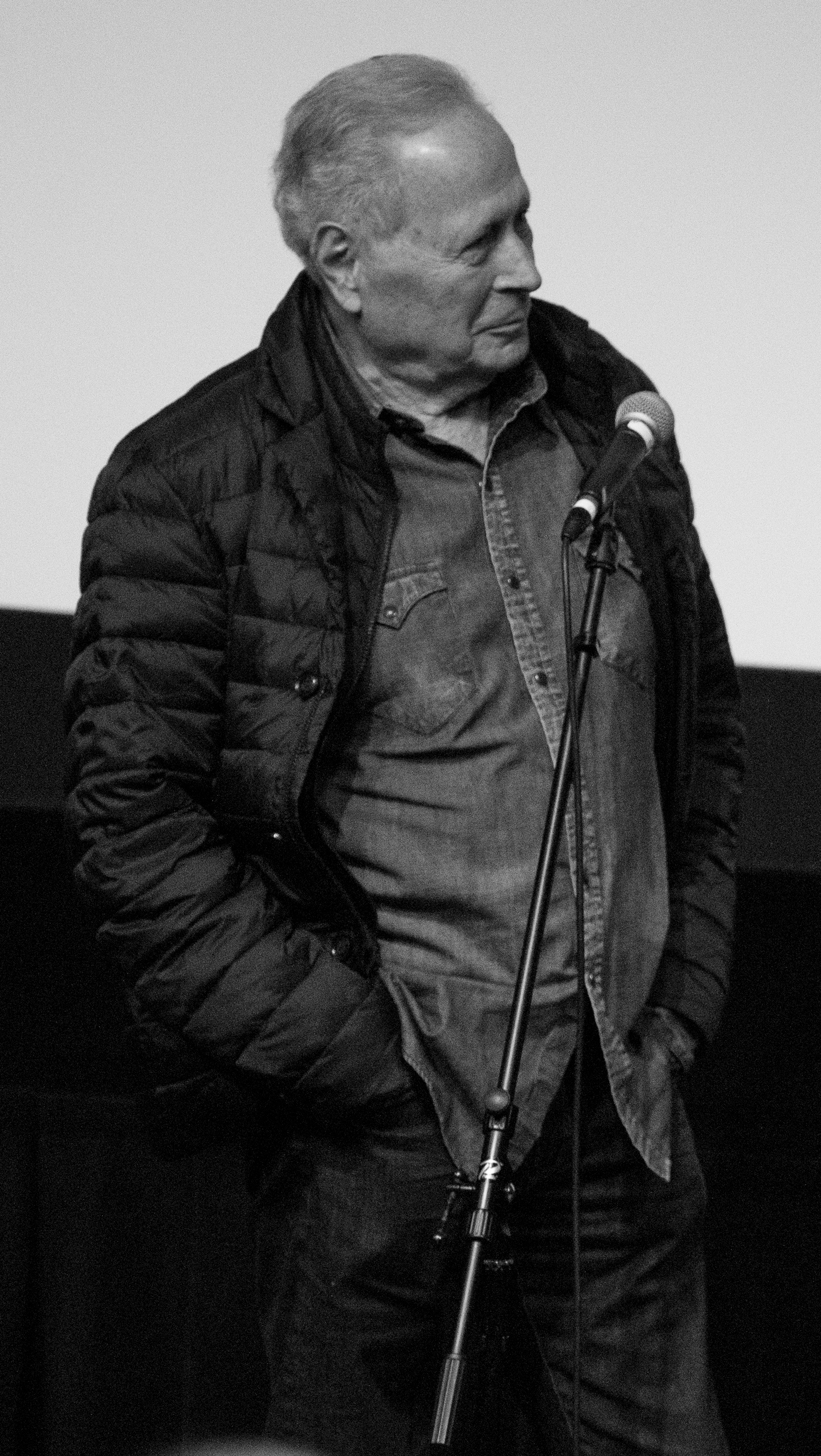

Donald Pilon (born April 12, 1938) is a Canadian film and television actor. He won the Canadian Film Award for Best Supporting Actor in 1972 for his role in The True Nature of Bernadette (La Vraie Nature de Bernadette), and was a Genie Award nominee in the same category in 1985 for The Crime of Ovide Plouffe (Le Crime d'Ovide Plouffe).

The brother of actor Daniel Pilon, he was born in Montreal, Quebec. His first acting role was in Gilles Carle's 1968 film The Rape of a Sweet Young Girl (Le viol d'une jeune fille douce).

His later roles have included the films Two Women in Gold (Deux femmes en or) (1970), The Wise Guys (Les Smattes) (1972), The Heavenly Bodies (1973), The Pyx (1973), Child Under a Leaf (1974), The Uncanny (1977), I Miss You, Hugs and Kisses (1978), City on Fire (1979), Fantastica (1980), La Guêpe (1986), An Imaginary Tale (Une histoire inventée) (1990), The Wind from Wyoming (Le Vent du Wyoming) (1994), Seducing Doctor Lewis (La Grande séduction) (2003), The Other Side of November (L'Autre côté de novembre) and Forgotten Flowers (Les fleurs oubliées) (2019), and the television series The Collaborators, The Mills of Power (Les Tisserands du pouvoir), Duplessis, Jamais deux sans toi and Les Invincibles.
