= The True Nature of Bernadette =

1972 film

- French: La Vraie Nature de Bernadette
- Directed by: Gilles Carle
- Written by: Gilles Carle
- Produced by: Gilles Carle; Pierre Lamy
- Starring: Micheline Lanctôt
- Cinematography: René Verzier
- Edited by: Gilles Carle; Susan Kay
- Music by: Pierre F. Brault
- Release date: 6 May 1972
- Running time: 115 minutes
- Country: Canada
- Language: French

The True Nature of Bernadette (French: La Vraie Nature de Bernadette) is a 1972 Canadian drama film directed by Gilles Carle. It was entered into the 1972 Cannes Film Festival. The film was also selected as the Canadian entry for the Best Foreign Language Film at the 45th Academy Awards, but was not accepted as a nominee. In 1984 the Toronto International Film Festival ranked the film tenth in the Top 10 Canadian Films of All Time. The film won Canadian Film Awards for Best Director, Actress (Micheline Lanctôt), Supporting Actor (Donald Pilon) and Musical Score.

== Plot ==
A Montreal housewife leaves her husband and comfortable home in order to practice vegetarianism and free love, which she finds in a Quebec farm.

== Cast ==
- Micheline Lanctôt as Bernadette
- Donald Pilon as Thomas
- Reynald Bouchard as Rock
- Robert Rivard as Felicien, le maire
- Willie Lamothe as Antoine, le postier
- Maurice Beaupré as Octave
- Ernest Guimond as Moise
- Julien Lippé as Auguste
- Claudette Delorimier as Madeleine
- Pierre Valcour as Courchesne
- Yvon Barrette as St-Luc
- Yves Allaire as St-Marc
- Yannick Therrien as Yannick
- Gilles Lajoie as Napoleon

== Production ==
The film was shot from 18 October to 29 November 1971.

== Release ==
The True Nature of Bernadette and A Fan's Notes were the first privately-funded Canadian films shown at the Cannes Film Festival. The film was theatrically released on 6 May 1972, in Montreal. The film was seen by 282,992 people in France.

== See also ==
- List of submissions to the 45th Academy Awards for Best Foreign Language Film
- List of Canadian submissions for the Academy Award for Best Foreign Language Film

== Works cited ==
- Spencer, Michael (2003). Hollywood North: Creating the Canadian Motion Picture Industry. Cantos International Publishing. ISBN 289594007X.
- Turner, D. John, ed. (1987). Canadian Feature Film Index: 1913-1985. Canadian Film Institute. ISBN 0660533642.
- Marshall, Bill (2001). Quebec National Cinema. McGill–Queen's University Press. ISBN 0-7735-2103-8.
