= Two's a Crowd =

Two's a Crowd may refer to:

- Two's a Crowd (TV series), a 1978 Canadian sitcom
- "Two's a Crowd" (All in the Family), a 1978 TV episode
- "Two's a Crowd" (Ally McBeal), a 2000 TV episode
- "Two's a Crowd" (The Avengers), a 1965 TV episode
- "Two's a Crowd" (Superman: The Animated Series), a 1997 TV episode
- Two's a Crowd, a 1950 Looney Tunes cartoon
