= François Protat =

Canadian cinematographer (1945–2019)

- Born: 1945; France
- Died: January 18, 2019 (aged 73–74); Montreal, Quebec, Canada
- Occupation: Cinematographer
- Years active: 1969-2013

François Protat, CSC (1945 – January 18, 2019) was a French and Canadian cinematographer. He won the Genie Award for Best Cinematography for his work on Joshua Then and Now (1985), out of four total nominations.

== Life and career ==
Protat was born in France in 1945, and graduated from the École nationale supérieure Louis-Lumière. He worked in the camera department of ORTF, notably shooting 34 episodes of the Claude Jade television series Les oiseaux rares.

In 1969, he moved to Canada. He established himself in the cinema of Quebec through his work with directors Gilles Carle and Jean-Claude Lord.

He won Best Cinematography at the 7th Genie Awards in 1986 for Joshua Then and Now. He was also nominated for Fantastica (1980), The Crime of Ovide Plouffe (1984), and Kabloonak (1994).

== Personal life ==
Protat was married to hairstylist and make-up artist Marie-Angèle Breitner.

=== Death ===
Protat died in Montreal on January 18, 2019.

== Partial filmography ==
- Bingo - 1974
- Orders - 1974
- Normande - 1975
- The Angel and the Woman - 1977
- Jacob Two-Two Meets the Hooded Fang - 1978
- Tomorrow Never Comes - 1978
- Chocolate Eclair - 1979
- Bye, See You Monday - 1979
- Heartbreak - 1979
- Fantastica - 1980
- The Plouffe Family - 1981
- Heartbreak High - 1981
- Tulips - 1981
- The Hot Touch - 1981
- Scandale - 1982
- Killing 'em Softly - 1982
- Between Friends - 1983
- Running Brave - 1983
- The Dog Who Stopped the War - 1984
- The Surrogate - 1984
- The Crime of Ovide Plouffe - 1984
- Joshua Then and Now - 1985
- Separate Vacations - 1986
- Switching Channels - 1988
- Weekend at Bernie's - 1989
- Beautiful Dreamers - 1990
- Clearcut - 1991
- The Diamond Fleece - 1992
- Brainscan - 1994
- Kabloonak - 1994
- Johnny Mnemonic - 1995
