= Night Magic =

- Directed by: Lewis Furey
- Written by: Lewis Furey; Leonard Cohen
- Produced by: Stephen Roth; Robert Lantos
- Starring: Nick Mancuso; Carole Laure
- Cinematography: Philippe Rousselot
- Edited by: Michel Arcand; Sophie Cornu
- Music by: Lewis Furey; Leonard Cohen; Richard Grégoire
- Production companies: Fildebroc; Moviecorp IX; TF1 Films Production
- Distributed by: Spectrafilm
- Release date: 17 May 1985 (Cannes)
- Running time: 95 minutes
- Countries: Canada; France
- Languages: English; French
- Budget: $2.64 million

Night Magic is a 1985 Canadian-French musical film written by Leonard Cohen and Lewis Furey and directed by Furey. The film stars Nick Mancuso as Michael, a down on his luck musician whose fantasies begin to come true after he meets an angel (Judy, played by Carole Laure). The film's supporting cast includes Stéphane Audran, Jean Carmet, Frank Augustyn, Louis Robitaille, Anik Bissonnette, Nanette Workman and Barbara Eve Harris.

The film was originally slated for release as Angel Eyes, but reverted to its original working title Night Magic by the time of its premiere at the Cannes Film Festival on May 17, 1985.

Most of the score is in Spenserian stanzas.

== Plot ==
Michael is an unsuccessful musician and playwright, leading a troupe. One night he is visited by three "angels" who offer him three wishes. He chooses as his first wish the ability to express himself perfectly in his art, and as his second, to choose a lover, draw her to him, send her away, and bring her back again.

His first wish brings him great success as an artist, but for his second wish he chooses one of the angels (Judy). She gives up her angelic form to become human and join him. They have a child together, but as in his wish, he rejects her, and their house is burned by the other two angels.

As his final wish, he asks to be assassinated. Judy refuses to participate, and goes to find him, but just as she reaches him, the other two angels assassinate him. Time stops while, in the only daylight scene of the film, the couple walk through the city together, but then return to his dying body.

== Cast ==
- Carole Laure as Judy
- Nick Mancuso as Michael
- Stephane Audran as Janice
- Jean Carmet as Sam
- Lyne Tremblay as Stardust
- Danielle Godin as Moonbeam
- Barbara Eve Harris as Doubt
- Kathryn Greenaway as Pinky
- Michelle Stennett as Michelle
- Frank Augustyn as Frank
- Louis Robitaille as Louis
- Jean-Marc Lebeau as Jean-Marc
- Jean-Hugues Rochette as Jean-Hugues
- Carlyle Miller as Louis (voice) / The Saxophonist
- Jean-Marie Benoit as The Guitarist
- Don Alias as The Drummer
- Margarita Stoker as Walkyrie
- Micheline Giard as Walkyrie
- Yolande Huraruk as Walkyrie
- Joan Henney as Walkyrie
- Nathalie Buisson as Miss Shy
- Brigitte Valette as Miss Strong
- France Deslauriers as Miss Beauty
- Aidan Devine as The Beggar
- Lewis Furey as Michael (voice)
- Karen Young as Doubt (voice)
- Erin Dickens as Purple Angel (voice)
- Estelle Ste-Croix as Caramel Angel (voice)
- Nanette Workman as Pinky (voice)
- Linda Niles as Michelle (voice)
- James Zeller as Frank (voice)
- Alan Gerber as Jean-Hugues (voice)
- Hugh Ball as Jean-Marc (voice)
- Zender Ary as The Beggar (voice)
- Charles Linton as Walkyrie (voice)
- Gaetan Essiambre as Walkyrie (voice)
- Shari Saunders as Walkyrie (voice)
- Alison Darcy as Cannibal Kid (uncredited)
- Jessamyn Hope as Cannibal Kid (uncredited)
- Robert Mofford as Leper (uncredited)

== Songs ==
Some of Cohen's lyrics recur in his later work, for example, Hunter's Lullaby appeared with almost identical lyrics on the album Various Positions, and the lyrics of the song The Bells form a large part of the song "Anthem" from The Future.

== Awards ==
The film garnered four Genie Award nominations at the 7th Genie Awards:

- Best Art Direction (François Séguin)
- Best Original Score (Furey)
- Best Original Song: "Angel Eyes"
- Best Original Song: "Fire"

It won the Best Original Song award for "Angel Eyes".
