= Anik Bissonnette =

Canadian ballet dancer (born 1962)

- Born: February 9, 1962 (age 63); Montreal, Quebec
- Career
- Current group: Les Grands Ballets Canadiens
- Dances: Ballet

Anik Bissonnette CC CQ ChOM (born February 9, 1962) is a Canadian ballet dancer. She began her professional ballet career with the Ballet de Montreal Eddy Toussaint in the 1980s, and became a principal dancer with Les Grands Ballets Canadiens in 1990.

== Career ==
=== Training ===
Bissonnette began her ballet training at the age of ten at the studios of Ludmilla Chiriaeff but discontinued her studies after six months. She later pursued jazz and dance at the École de Danse Eddy Toussaint. Toussaint subsequently offered her a scholarship on the condition that she also take classical ballet classes, which she accepted.

=== Le Ballet de Montréal Eddy Toussaint ===
In 1979, at age 17, Bissonnette joined Toussaint's troupe, Le Ballet de Montréal Eddy Toussaint. She originated several leading roles in Toussaint's choreographies, including Rose La Tulipe (1979), Un Simple Moment (1981), Requiem de Mozart (1986), New World Symphony (1987), and Bonjour Brel (1988).

Under Toussaint's artistic direction, Bissonnette formed a partnership with Louis Robitaille. She starred in several televised productions with Le Ballet de Montréal Eddy Toussaint and appeared in Night Magic, a film directed by Lewis Furey. Her participation in the 1984 Helsinki Ballet Competition contributed to Toussaint earning a gold medal for his choreography in Un simple moment.

She first danced the role of Giselle in Odesa, Ukraine, USSR in 1988. The following year, she was invited to Toulouse, France, where she performed the role of Odette/Odile in Swan Lake alongside Laurent Hilaire, a principal dancer with the Opéra de Paris. She also portrayed Juliet in Nicholas Beriozoff's Romeo and Juliet and the title role in Cinderella.

=== Les Grands Ballets Canadiens ===
In 1989, Bissonnette joined Les Grands Ballets Canadiens in Montréal and was named principal dancer the following year. She performed leading roles in The Nutcracker, Coppélia, La Fille Mal Gardée, Les Sylphides, Giselle, and Swan Lake. She also played dramatic principal roles in Antony Tudor's Jardin aux Lilas and Pillar of Fire and José Limón's Moor's Pavane. Additionally, she has performed in ten of George Balanchine's ballets. In 1991, she reprised the role of Giselle, partnered with Éric Vu An, an étoile at the Paris Opera. Bissonnette left the company in 1996.

Throughout her career with Les Grands, Bissonnette worked with choreographers including James Kudelka, William Forsythe, Jiri Kylian, Ohad Naharin, Nacho Duato, Nils Christe, Susan Toumine, and Hans van Manen. She collaborated with Montréal choreographer Ginette Laurin and emerging choreographers such as Kevin O'Day, Gioconda Barbuto, Septim Webre, Didy Veldman, and Stijn Celis. In 2001, she created the role of Lisa in Kim Brandstrup's La Dame de Pique.

Bissonnette frequently performed at gala events worldwide, including in Melbourne, Athens, Prague, Budapest, Thessaloniki, Montréal, New York City, Toronto, Vienna, Spoleto (Italy), Helsinki, and Bratislava.

In 2005, Carla Fracci of Rome's Teatro dell'Opera invited her to revive the ballet La Chatte, which Les Grands Ballets Canadiens de Montréal had staged for her in 1990. She performed in Vienna for the closing of Tanz für Europa.

She officially retired in 2007.

=== Leadership ===
In 2015, Bissonnette became the artistic director of École Supérieure de ballet du Québec.

Alongside her stage career, Bissonnette serves as the Artistic Director of the Festival des Arts de Saint-Sauveur and is the President of the Regroupement québécois de la danse.

Bissonnette has contributed to organizing Montreal's Festival Quartiers Danses.

== Personal life ==
Bissonnette was in a relationship with Louis Robitaille for nearly 20 years before they separated in 2001. She has one daughter who attended l'École supérieure de danse.

== Awards and honors ==
- 1985: Best individual Performance at the International de Danse Porsche du Canada.
- 1985: Personality of the week by La Presse.
- 1988: Personality of the year, Youth section by the Salon de la Femme de Montréal.
- 1990: Prix des Biches (awarded on the Radio-Canada television show La Bande des Six)
- 1995: Officer of the Order of Canada.
- 1996: Chevalier de l'Ordre du Québec
- 2005: Awarded the Prix du Public at the Budapest Ballet Gala
- 2007: Awarded the Prix du Public at the Budapest Ballet Gala.
- 2014: Governor General's Performing Arts Award for Lifetime Artistic Achievement
- 2018: Ordre de Montréal
- 2021: Ordre des arts et des lettres du Québec
- 2024: Prix de la danse de Montréal, catégorie Contribution exceptionnelle.
