= La Guêpe (film) =

- Directed by: Gilles Carle
- Written by: Gilles Carle; Camille Coudari
- Produced by: François Floquet
- Cinematography: Guy Dufaux
- Music by: Osvaldo Montes
- Release date: 1986
- Running time: 87 minutes
- Country: Canada

La Guêpe (literally "The Wasp", but titled either Skybolt or Scalp in English, depending on the market) is a 1986 drama/thriller film directed and co-written by Gilles Carle.

== Plot ==
A young pilot witnesses the unintentional murder of her two sons (by a rich, drunken couple driving carelessly) and, following a court's decision not to press criminal charges, she decides to get her revenge.

== Cast ==
- Chloé Sainte-Marie as Chloé Richard
- Warren Peace as Steven Cook
- Donald Pilon as Delphis Martin
- Ethne Grimes as Stéphanie
- Claude Gauthier as Louis Richard
- Gilbert Turp as Marc
- Paul Buissonneau as Joseph Lambert
- Alain Villeneuve as Le ministre
