= Micheline Lanctôt =

Canadian actress and director

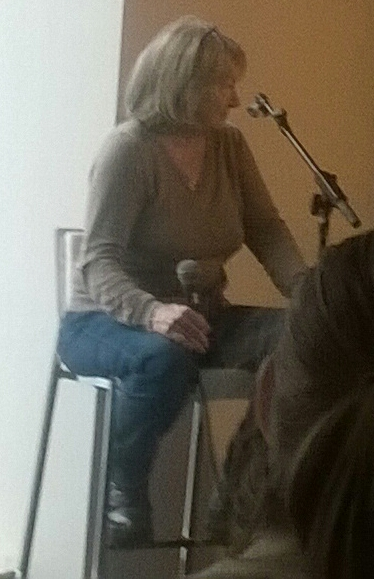
- Lanctôt in 2018
- Born: May 12, 1947 (age 79); Frelighsburg, Quebec, Canada
- Occupations: Film director, actress, screenwriter
- Years active: 1972–present

Micheline Lanctôt (born May 12, 1947) is a Canadian actress, film director, screenwriter, and musician.

== Biography ==
Lanctôt was born in Frelighsburg, Quebec. Her post-secondary education was in music, fine arts, and theatre at Collège Jésus-Marie in Outremont, and in art history at the Université de Montréal and the École des Beaux-Arts de Montréal; she later studied film animation at the National Film Board of Canada (NFB) and then at Gerald Potterton's studios, Potterton Productions, where she remained for four years.

Lanctôt began her acting career in 1972, winning a Canadian Film Award for Best Actress for her starring role in Gilles Carle's The True Nature of Bernadette (La vraie nature de Bernadette). Since then, she has appeared in a wide variety of film and television roles, such as Carle's The Heavenly Bodies (Les Corps Célestes), Ted Kotcheff's award-winning The Apprenticeship of Duddy Kravitz, Claude Chabrol's Blood Relatives and Guy Fournier's Radio-Canada TV series Jamais deux sans toi.

She has directed for the theatre also, directing Oleanna by David Mamet for the Théâtre de Quat'Sous in Montreal in 1994, and in 1999, Bousille et les justes by Gratien Gélinas for the Théâtre du Rideau Vert.

She began her live-action film-directing career with The Handyman (L'Homme à tout faire) (1980), nominated for best direction and for best film at the Genie Awards in 1981. This success was followed by Sonatine (1984), which launched the career of Pascale Bussières and won both the Genie Award for Best Director at the 6th Genie Awards in 1985, and the now-defunct Silver Lion for Best First Film (1983-1987) at the 41st Venice International Film Festival. She won the 1995 Prix Guy-L'Écuyer for L'oreille d'un sourd.

Since 1982, Lanctôt has been a part-time instructor in the Mel Hoppenheim School of Cinema at Concordia University.

Lanctôt defended Gaétan Soucy's novel The Little Girl Who Was Too Fond of Matches (La petite fille qui aimait trop les allumettes) in the 2004 edition of Le Combat des livres, broadcast on Première Chaîne.

In 2016 she was the curator of the Festival Vues dans la tête de... film festival in Rivière-du-Loup. She is also a matron of the Prix collégial du cinéma québécois, an annual program engaging film studies students in Quebec CEGEPs to present an award for the year's best Quebec film.

== Awards and recognition ==
- Winner of an Etrog (now known as Genie), best performance by a lead actress (1972)
- Winner of the Genie, best achievement in direction, for Sonatine (1984)
- Winner of the Silver Lion, Venice Film Festival for best first work, Sonatine (1984)
- Recipient of the Governor General's Performing Arts Award for Lifetime Artistic Achievement (2003)

== Filmography ==
=== Film ===
Year	Title	Director	Writer
1975	A Token Gesture	Yes	No
1980	The Handyman (L'Homme à tout faire)	Yes	Yes
1984	Sonatine	Yes	Yes
1987	The Pursuit of Happiness (La Poursuite du bonheur)	Yes	No
1988	Onzième spéciale	Yes	No
1988	The Heat Line (La ligne de chaleur)	No	Yes
1993	Two Can Play (Deux actrices)	Yes	Yes
1994	A Hero's Life (La Vie d'un héros)	Yes	Yes
2003	Juniper Tree (Le Piège d'Issoudun)	Yes	Yes
2009	Suzie	Yes	Yes
2011	For the Love of God (Pour l'amour de Dieu)	Yes	Yes
2015	The Handout (Autrui)	Yes	Yes
2016	9 (9, le film)	Yes	No
2019	A Way of Life (Une manière de vivre)	Yes	Yes

Acting roles

- The True Nature of Bernadette (La Vraie nature de Bernadette) - 1972
- The Heavenly Bodies (Les Corps célestes) - 1973
- Noël et Juliette - 1973
- Souris, tu m'inquiètes - 1973
- Voyage to Grand Tartarie (Voyage en Grande Tartarie) - 1974
- The Apprenticeship of Duddy Kravitz - 1974
- Child Under a Leaf - 1974
- Little Tougas (Ti-Cul Tougas) - 1976
- Blood Relatives (Les Liens du sang) - 1978
- Blood and Guts - 1978
- A Scream from Silence (Mourir à tue-tête) - 1979
- The Coffin Affair (L'Affaire Coffin) - 1980
- The Ear of a Deaf Man (L'Oreille d'un sourd) - 1996
- Heads or Tails (J'en suis!) - 1997
- The Revenge of the Woman in Black (La Vengeance de la femme en noir) - 1997
- Streetheart (Le Coeur au poing) - 1998
- Now or Never (Aujourd'hui ou jamais) - 1998
- The Long Winter (Quand je serai parti... vous vivrez encore) - 1999
- Le Petit ciel - 1999
- Women Without Wings - 2002
- How My Mother Gave Birth to Me During Menopause (Comment ma mère accoucha de moi durant sa ménopause) - 2003
- The Barbarian Invasions (Les Invasions barbares) - 2003
- Children of the Setting Suns - 2003
- A Year in the Death of Jack Richards - 2004
- Familia - 2004
- Good Neighbours - 2010
- Sarah Prefers to Run (Sarah préfère la course) - 2013
- Winter Claire (Claire l'hiver) - 2017
- Laughter (Le Rire) - 2020
- Family Game (Arsenault et fils) - 2022
- Frontiers (Frontières) - 2023
- The Nature of Love (Simple comme Sylvain) - 2023
- You Are Not Alone (Vous n'êtes pas seul) - 2024
- Where Souls Go (Où vont les âmes?) - 2025

=== Television ===
Actress

- Jamais deux sans toi - 1977, 1996
- Omertà - 1996
- Réseaux - 1998
- Le Pollock - 1999
- Tag (2000)
- Bunker, le cirque - 2002
- Le Bonheur c'est une chanson triste - 2004
- Un monde à part - 2004
- Tripping the Wire: A Stephen Tree Mystery - 2005
- Unité 9 - 2012-2015
- The Disappearance - 2017

Director

- Eve (2003)
- The Stones (2004)
- Les Guerriers (2004) (Also writer)
