= La ballade de Michel =

Single by Celine Dion

from the album Opération beurre de pinottes soundtrack
- Language: French
- Released: December 1985
- Genre: Pop
- Length: 3:00
- Label: TBS; Epic
- Songwriters: Lewis Furey; Eddy Marnay
- Producer: Lewis Furey

Celine Dion singles chronology
"Dans la main d'un magicien" (1985)	"La ballade de Michel" (1985)	"Fais ce que tu voudras" (1986)

"La ballade de Michel" (lit. 'Michael's ballad') is a song by Canadian singer Celine Dion, written by Lewis Furey and Eddy Marnay. It was released in December 1985 in Quebec, Canada, as the second single from the soundtrack of the film Opération beurre de pinottes. Dion also recorded an English-language version, with lyrics by Howard Forman and Judi Richards, titled "Michael's Song".

== Background ==
"La ballade de Michel" was issued as a 7-inch single, and its English version titled "Michael's Song" was released as a promotional single.

The soundtrack album The Peanut Butter Solution / Opération beurre de pinottes includes both versions, as well as two other Dion recordings: "Dans la main d'un magicien" and its English-language counterpart "Listen to the Magic Man". Neither the French nor the English version of "La ballade de Michel" was included on any of Dion's albums. The English version has never been released on CD.

In November 2014, "La ballade de Michel" and "Michael's Song" were released digitally worldwide.

== Formats and track listing ==
- Canadian 7-inch single
1. "La ballade de Michel" – 3:00
2. "La ballade de Michel" – 3:00
- Canadian promotional 7-inch single
1. "Michael's Song" – 3:00
2. "Message" – 0:08
