= 1989 Cannes Film Festival =

- Official poster of the 42nd Cannes Film Festival, featuring an original illustration by Ludovic.
- Opening film: New York Stories
- Closing film: Old Gringo
- Location: Cannes, France
- Founded: 1946
- Awards: Palme d'Or: Sex, Lies, and Videotape
- No. of films: 22 (In Competition)
- Festival date: 11 May 1989 – 23 May 1989
- Website: festival-cannes.com/en

Cannes Film Festival
- 1990 1988

The 42nd Cannes Film Festival took place from 11 to 23 May 1989. West German filmmaker Wim Wenders served as jury president for the main competition.

American filmmaker Steven Soderbergh won the Palme d'Or, the festival's top prize, for his debut film Sex, Lies, and Videotape.

During the 1989 festival, the first Cinéma & liberté forum was held with the participation of a hundred famous directors from various countries. They discussed about the freedom of expression and signed a declaration protesting against all forms of censorship still existing in the world.

The festival opened with New York Stories, an anthology film by Woody Allen, Francis Ford Coppola, Martin Scorsese, and closed with Old Gringo by Luis Puenzo.

== Juries ==
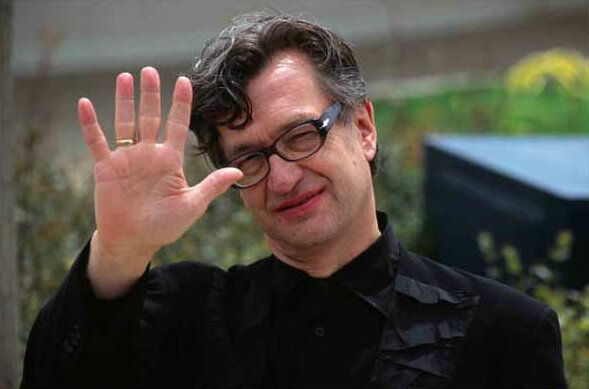
Wim Wenders, Jury President for the Main competition

=== Main competition ===
- Wim Wenders, West German filmmaker - Jury President
- Héctor Babenco, Argentine-Brazilian filmmaker
- Claude Beylie
- Renée Blanchar, Canadian filmmaker
- Silvio Clementelli, Italian producer
- Georges Delerue, French composer
- Sally Field, American actress
- Christine Gouze-Rénal, French producer
- Peter Handke, Austrian author
- Krzysztof Kieślowski, Polish filmmaker

=== Camera d'Or ===
- Raf Vallone, Italian actor - Jury President
- Klaus Eder, journalist
- Yvan Gauthier, cinephile
- Bernard Jubard
- Philippe Maarek, film critic
- Moustafa Salah Hashem, film critic
- Peter Scarlet, cinephile
- Suzanne Schiffman, French filmmaker

== Official selection ==
=== In Competition ===
The following feature films competed for the Palme d'Or:

English title	Original title	Director(s)	Production country
Black Rain	黒い雨	Shōhei Imamura	Japan
Chimère		Claire Devers	France
Cinema Paradiso	Nuovo cinema Paradiso	Giuseppe Tornatore	Italy, France
Do the Right Thing		Spike Lee	United States
Evil Angels		Fred Schepisi	Australia, United States
Francesco		Liliana Cavani	Italy, West Germany
Jesus of Montreal	Jésus de Montréal	Denys Arcand	Canada, France
Kuarup		Ruy Guerra	Brazil
Lost Angels		Hugh Hudson	United States
Monsieur Hire		Patrice Leconte	France
Moon Child	El niño de la luna	Agustí Villaronga	Spain
Mystery Train		Jim Jarmusch	United States, Japan
Reunion		Jerry Schatzberg	United Kingdom, France, West Germany
Rosalie Goes Shopping		Percy Adlon	West Germany
Sex, Lies, and Videotape		Steven Soderbergh	United States
Spider's Web	Das Spinnennetz	Bernhard Wicki	West Germany
Splendor		Ettore Scola	Italy
Sweetie		Jane Campion	Australia
Time of the Gypsies	Дом за вешање	Emir Kusturica	Yugoslavia, Italy
Too Beautiful for You	Trop belle pour toi	Bertrand Blier	France
Torrents of Spring		Jerzy Skolimowski	United Kingdom, France, Italy
The Women on the Roof	Kvinnorna på taket	Carl-Gustav Nykvist	Sweden

=== Un Certain Regard ===
The following films were selected for the Un Certain Regard section:

English title	Original title	Director(s)	Production country
Black Sin	Schwarze Sünde	Jean-Marie Straub and Danièle Huillet	West Germany, France
Baroque	Barroco	Paul Leduc	Mexico, Cuba
Errors of Youth	Ошибки юности	Boris Frumin	Soviet Union
Fool's Mate	Zugzwang	Mathieu Carrière	West Germany
Golden Horseshoes	صفايح ذهب	Nouri Bouzid	Tunisia
Malpractice		Bill Bennett	Australia
My 20th Century	Az én XX. századom	Ildikó Enyedi	Hungary, West Germany, Cuba
Nine Circles of Hell	Devět kruhů pekla	Milan Muchna	Czechoslovakia
Piravi		Shaji N. Karun	India
The Prisoner of St. Petersburg		Ian Pringle	Australia, West Germany
Santa Sangre		Alejandro Jodorowsky	Mexico, Italy
The Tenth One in Hiding	Il decimo clandestino	Lina Wertmüller	Italy
Thick Skinned	Peaux de vaches	Patricia Mazuy	France
Treffen in Travers		Michael Gwisdek	East Germany
Venus Peter		Ian Sellar	United Kingdom
Voices of Sarafina!		Nigel Noble	United States
Whirlwind	Смерч	Bako Sadykov	Soviet Union
Why Has Bodhi-Dharma Left for the East?	달마가 동쪽으로 간 까닭은?	Bae Yong-kyun	South Korea
Wired		Larry Peerce	United States

=== Out of Competition ===
The following films were selected to be screened out of competition:

English title	Original title	Director(s)	Production country
New York Stories (opening film)		Woody Allen, Francis Ford Coppola and Martin Scorsese	United States
Old Gringo (closing film)		Luis Puenzo	United States

=== Special Screenings ===
The following films were selected to receive a special screening:

English title	Original title	Director(s)	Production country
1001 films (short)		André Delvaux	Belgium
50 ans (short)		Gilles Carle	Canada
Fight for Us	Orapronobis	Lino Brocka	Philippines
Ganashatru	গণশত্রু	Satyajit Ray	India
Lawrence of Arabia (1962)		David Lean	United Kingdom, United States
Liberté		Laurent Jacob	France
The Monkey Folk	Le peuple singe	Gérard Vienne	France
Scandal		Michael Caton-Jones	United Kingdom

=== Short Films Competition ===
The following short films competed for the Short Film Palme d'Or:

- Beau Fixe Sur Cormeilles by Gilles Lacombe
- Blind Alley by Emmanuel Salinger
- Full Metal Racket by William Nunez
- The Gest of Segu (Segu janjo) by Mambaye Coulibaly
- Kitchen Sink by Alison Maclean
- Manly Games (Muzné hry) by Jan Svankmajer
- Performance Pieces (Morceaux Choisis) by Tom Abrams
- The Persistent Peddler (Le Colporteur) by Claude Cloutier
- Le Théâtre du Père Carlo by Rao Kheidmets
- Yes We Can by Faith Hubley

== Parallel sections ==
=== International Critics' Week ===
The following feature films were screened for the 28th International Critics' Week (28e Semaine de la Critique):

Feature film competition

- Rose of the Desert (Rose des Sables) by Mohamed Rachid Benhadj (Algeria)
- Tjoet Nja’ Dhien by Eros Djarot (Indonesia)
- As Tears Go By by Wong Kar-wai (Hong Kong)
- Waller's Last Trip (Wallers letzter Gang) by Christian Wagner (West Germany)
- Arab by Fadhel Jaibi and Fadhel Jaziri (Tunisia)
- La Ville de Yun by U-Sun Kim (Japan)
- Les Poissons morts (Die toten Fische) by Michael Synek (Austria)
- Montalvo et l’enfant by Claude Mourieras (France)
- Black Square (Chyornyy kvadrat) by Iosif Pasternak (Soviet Union)
- Duende by Jean-Blaise Junod (Switzerland)

Short film competition

- Warszawa Koluszki by Jerzy Zalewski (Poland)
- Le Porte plume by Marie-Christine Perrodin (France)
- Blind Curve by Gary Markowitz (United States)
- The Three Soldiers by Kamal Musale (Switzerland)
- Work Experience by James Hendrie (United Kingdom)
- Der Mensch mit den modernen Nerven by Bady Minck (Austria/Luxembourg)
- Trombone en coulisses by Hubert Toint (Belgium, France)
- Wstega mobiusa by Lukasz Karwowski (Poland)
- La Femme mariée de Nam Xuong by Tran Anh Hung (France)

=== Directors' Fortnight ===
The following feature films were screened for the 1989 Directors' Fortnight (Quinzaine des Réalizateurs):

- Caracas by Michael Schottenberg
- Der 7. Kontinent by Michael Haneke
- Der Philosoph by Rudolf Thome
- Eat a Bowl Of Tea by Wayne Wang
- El Rio que nos Lleva by Antonio del Real
- Zerograd by Karen Shakhnazarov
- Il piccolo diavolo by Roberto Benigni
- Maria Von Den Sternen by Thomas Mauch
- Melancholia by Andi Engel
- Niu Peng by Dai Sijie
- Piccoli Equivoci by Ricky Tognazzi
- Sidewalk Stories by Charles Lane
- Sis by Zülfü Livaneli
- Speaking Parts by Atom Egoyan
- Yaaba by Idrissa Ouedraogo

== Official Awards ==
=== In Competition ===
- Palme d'Or: Sex, Lies, and Videotape by Steven Soderbergh
- Grand Prix:
  - Cinema Paradiso by Giuseppe Tornatore
  - Too Beautiful for You by Bertrand Blier
- Best Director: Emir Kusturica for Time of the Gypsies
- Best Actress: Meryl Streep for Evil Angels
- Best Actor: James Spader for Sex, Lies, and Videotape
- Best Artistic Contribution: Jim Jarmusch for Mystery Train
- Jury Prize: Jesus of Montreal by Denys Arcand
- Special Award: Gregory Peck

=== Caméra d'Or ===
- My 20th Century by Ildikó Enyedi
  - Special Mention:
    - Piravi by Shaji N. Karun
    - Waller's Last Trip by Christian Wagner

=== Short Film Palme d'Or ===
- 50 ans by Gilles Carle
  - Best Short Film:
    - Performance Pieces by Tom Abrams
    - Yes We Can by Faith Hubley

== Independent Awards ==
=== FIPRESCI Prizes ===
- Sex, Lies, and Videotape by Steven Soderbergh (In competition)
- Yaaba by Idrissa Ouedraogo (Directors' Fortnight)

=== Commission Supérieure Technique ===
- Technical Grand Prize: Black Rain by Shōhei Imamura

=== Prize of the Ecumenical Jury ===
- Jesus of Montreal by Denys Arcand
  - Special Mention:
    - Black Rain by Shōhei Imamura
    - Yaaba by Idrissa Ouedraogo

=== Award of the Youth ===
- Foreign Film: Caracas by Michael Schottenberg

== Media ==
- INA: Climbing of the steps for the opening of the 1989 festival (commentary in French)
- INA: Assessment of and reactions to the list of winners of the 1989 Festival (commentary in French)
