= 50 ans =

1989 film by Gilles Carle

- Directed by: Gilles Carle
- Produced by: Éric Michel
- Cinematography: Suzanne Allard
- Distributed by: National Film Board of Canada
- Release date: 1989
- Running time: 3 minutes
- Country: Canada
- Language: French

50 ans is a 1989 Canadian short film directed by Gilles Carle. It won the Short Film Palme d'Or at the 1989 Cannes Film Festival.

== Summary ==
The film consists of brief clips, celebrating the 50th anniversary of the National Film Board of Canada. The following films are included in the short film:

- Very Nice, Very Nice (1961)
- Neighbours (1952)
- Evolution (1971)
- Pas de Deux (1968)
- Bead Game (1977)
- The Railrodder (1965)
