= Child Under a Leaf =

- Theatrical release poster
- Directed by: George Bloomfield
- Written by: George Bloomfield
- Produced by: Robert Baylis; Murray Shostak
- Starring: Dyan Cannon; Joseph Campanella; Donald Pilon; Al Waxman; Micheline Lanctôt
- Cinematography: Donald Wilder
- Edited by: George Bloomfield
- Music by: Francis Lai
- Distributed by: Troma Entertainment
- Release date: October 11, 1974
- Running time: 88 minutes
- Country: Canada
- Language: English

Child Under a Leaf (released as Love Child in Britain) is a 1974 Canadian drama film directed by George Bloomfield and starring Dyan Cannon.

== Premise ==
An abused woman has a baby with a man she is having an affair with while trying to find a way to end her marriage to her controlling husband.

== Cast ==
- Dyan Cannon - Domino
- Joseph Campanella - The Husband
- Donald Pilon - Joseph
- Al Waxman - The Storekeeper
- Micheline Lanctôt - The Friend

== Production ==
The movie was filmed in Montreal, Quebec by Potterton Productions.

== Awards ==
It was a Canadian Film Award nominee for Best Feature Film in 1975, but did not win.
