= The Peanut Butter Solution =

1985 Canadian children's fantasy film

- US theatrical release poster
- Directed by: Michael Rubbo
- Written by: Vojtěch Jasný; Andrée Pelletier; Louise Pelletier; Michael Rubbo
- Produced by: Rock Demers; Nicole Robert
- Starring: Mathew Mackay; Siluck Saysanasy; Alison Darcy; Michael Hogan
- Cinematography: Thomas Vámos
- Music by: Lewis Furey; Songs by Céline Dion
- Production companies: Les Productions La Fête; Telefilm Canada
- Distributed by: Cinéma Plus (Canada); New World Pictures (United States)
- Release date: 1985
- Running time: 93 minutes (theatrical); 90 minutes (television and home video)
- Country: Canada
- Languages: English; French

The Peanut Butter Solution (French title: Opération beurre de pinottes) is a 1985 Canadian children's fantasy film directed by Michael Rubbo. The second installment in the Tales for All (Contes Pour Tous) series of films by Les Productions La Fête, the film stars Mathew Mackay, Siluck Saysanasy, Alison Darcy, and Michael Hogan.

The film was released by Cinéma Plus in Canada and New World Pictures in the United States. One of the best known films in the Tales for All series, it has become a cult classic in the years since its release.

== Plot ==
Michael Baskin is an average 11-year-old boy. His father, Billy Baskin, is a struggling artist and temporary sole caretaker of the children, while his wife attends to the estate of her recently deceased father in Australia. Upon hearing that an abandoned mansion has recently burned down, Michael and his friend Connie decide to explore the remains. Outside the mansion, Connie dares Michael to take a look inside, leading to a frightening encounter with the ghosts of its homeless inhabitants who had died in the fire. Michael does not know this yet, but his fearsome run-in with the ghosts has given him a mysterious illness, "The Fright." Michael wakes up the next morning to find that "The Fright" has made him lose his hair. After a failed attempt with a wig, the ghosts visit Michael in his sleep and give him the recipe of a magical formula for hair growth, the main ingredient of which is peanut butter. Michael's first attempt to make the formula is thwarted when his father and sister dispose of it, thinking he was creating something to ingest. Michael then forgets the recipe.

The ghosts return the following night, and give Michael a second chance by giving him the recipe again to repay him for earlier giving some money to the male homeless person when he was alive. They also give Michael special instructions on not adding too much peanut butter, which will result in dreadful consequences. Michael successfully makes the formula but ignores their instructions by putting in more peanut butter to make the mixture less runny, and wakes up the next morning to find that his new hair has begun to grow super fast. After only a few minutes, he has grown a full head of hair. Suspicious, Connie confronts Michael about his unusual ability. When Michael reveals his concoction, Connie decides to apply some to his pubic area in an attempt to create the illusion that he is going through puberty. Connie soon discovers that the joke is on him. Soon, Michael and Connie's hair grows to such lengths that it becomes a nuisance for the school and their classmates, resulting in their suspensions. While Michael searches for a solution, Connie discovers that the hair will stop growing by yelling at it.

The art teacher at Michael's school, the Signor, frightens children and forbids them from using their imagination. After getting fired from the school, the Signor finds out about Michael's condition and kidnaps him (and many other neighborhood children) to make magic paint brushes from Michael's ever-growing hair, in which he subdues Michael with a knockout drug. The kidnapped children are put to work under harsh conditions. The paintbrushes are so powerful that they paint whatever their user imagines without need for detail or neatness. Michael's sister, Suzie, and Connie discover the Signor's magical paintbrush factory and try to rescue Michael and the other kids. Connie tries to use force, but Signor and his dog James overpower him. Instead, Connie tricks the Signor into painting a picture of the abandoned mansion. Connie then dares him to investigate inside, leading "The Fright" to be passed on from Michael to the Signor. The Signor, now bald, escapes from the haunted house and chases the children, locking them up. Just as Connie is about to escape with Michael, Susan and their dad find the factory, and the local police arrest the Signor.

The film ends with the family reunited, the mother returning home, and Michael's hair no longer growing out of control.

== Cast ==
- Mathew Mackay as Michael
- Siluck Saysanasy as Connie
- Alison Podbrey as Suzie
- Michael Hogan as Billy
- Michel Maillot as The Signor
- Helen Hughes as Mary
- Griffith Brewer as Tom
- Harry Hill as Dr. Epstein
- Edgar Fruitier
- Pat Thompson
- Terrence Labrosse
- Doug Smith
- Nick Manekas
- Karl Kastrada
- Patrick Saint-Pierre
- Jeremy Spry
- Cheryl Zaman-Zadir
- Audie Grant
- Vicki Lee
- Naoka Takahataki
- Anna Vitre

== Production ==
- The original working title of the film was Michael's Fright.
- This film features the first English-language songs performed by Céline Dion (Listen to the Magic Man and Michael's Song). The French-language version of the film features French-language versions of the same songs (Dans la main d'un magicien and La ballade de Michel).
- Skippy peanut butter paid for prominent product placement in the film.

== Home media ==
The Peanut Butter Solution has been released on home video numerous times. In the USA, the film had been released only on VHS (through New World Video, Anchor Bay, and Starmaker Entertainment). In Canada, the film was released on DVD in 2006 as part of a box set with 5 other Tales for All films. Another box set, with every Tales for All movie, was released in 2011. In 2012, the movie was released separately. All of these DVD releases were in French only.

In 2013, the movie was transferred to high definition from the original 35mm camera negative. This transfer was used for a Blu-ray release in Canada on April 11, 2017, and includes French and English language tracks.

On December 10, 2019, Severin Films released it for the first time on Blu-ray/DVD in the US as the first offering of their Severin Kids label. This release includes an "extended version" with 3 minutes of extra scenes.

== Reception ==
The How Did This Get Made? podcast released an episode on the film on July 3, 2020.

In 2020, YouTuber Coda Gardner released an hour-long documentary about the film, Michael's Fright: The Strange True Story of the Peanut Butter Solution.
