= Lewis Furey =

Canadian musician (born 1949)

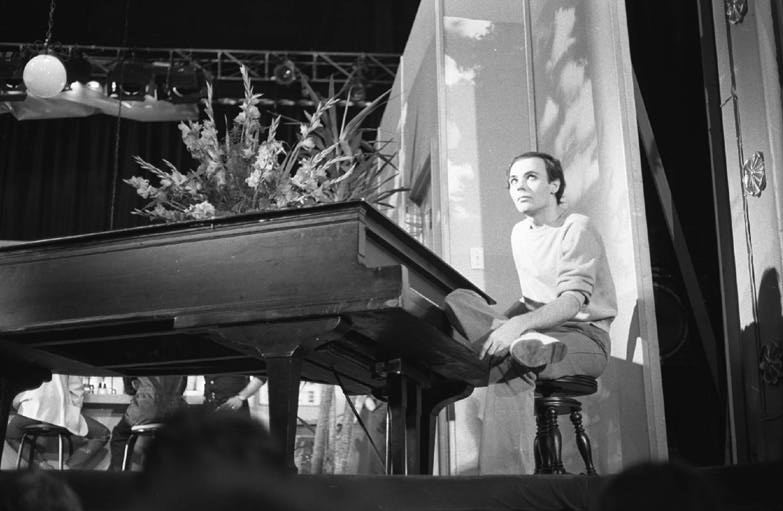
- Furey on the set of Fantastica, 1979
- Born: Lewis Greenblatt; 7 June 1949 (age 77); Montreal, Quebec, Canada
- Spouse: Carole Laure

Lewis Furey (born Lewis Greenblatt; 7 June 1949) is a Canadian composer, singer, violinist, pianist, actor and director.

== Career ==
Born in Montreal, Quebec to French and American parents, Furey trained as a classical violinist, and at age 11 performed as a soloist in the Matinées pour la jeunesse concert series of the Montreal Symphony Orchestra. From 1961 to 1965 he studied at the Conservatoire de musique du Québec à Montréal. He later studied at the Juilliard School in New York City. In 1972, he began playing and recording his own rock music compositions. In the ensuing years, he produced three albums of pop music: Lewis Furey (1975, A & M 4522), The Humours of Lewis Furey (1976, A & M 4594) and The Sky is Falling (1979, Aquarius AQR-521). Distinguishing features of the albums were Furey's Lou Reed-like vocal stylings, a number of songs with gay content (particularly the local Montréal radio hit Hustler's Tango), and exotic arrangements featuring unusual uses of violin and banjo as well as elements of klezmer music.

In 1975, he began a new venture as a composer for films. His first film score, for director Gilles Carle's La Tête de Normande St. Onge (1975), won a Canadian Film Award. In 1977, he worked on the Gilles Carle film L'Ange et la femme along with his future wife, the actress and singer Carole Laure. This project involved more than composing alone; Furey and Laure are famously seen performing a sex act in the film. Furey also composed for the Allan Moyle film The Rubber Gun, which despite the risqué-sounding title was about families affected by drug use. Later in the 1970s, Furey and Laure produced a number of successful stage reviews in Paris. Furey also served as producer and frequently also as songwriter for a series of albums by Carole Laure, beginning with Alibis (1979, RCA KKL-1-0290), a hit in Québec in 1979. In 1980, Furey wrote the music for another Gilles Carle film Fantastica, which starred Laure in the lead role of Lorca. Furey also acted in the film and was nominated for a Genie Award in Canada for "Best Performance by an Actor in a Leading Role."

Furey further developed his career in film and television music with productions such as a 1983 Gilles Carle movie, Maria Chapdelaine, based on the classic Québec-based Louis Hémon novel of the same name. His score for this film won a Genie Award. In 1984 he wrote the screenplay for Night Magic, with the script co-written by Leonard Cohen.

Based in France since the late 1970s, Furey has continued to score film and television work as well as producing and writing for successful albums by Laure, such as She Says Move On (1991) and Sentiments naturels (1997). A stage production based on the latter ran for over a month in Paris in 1998.

Furey's songs have been recorded by various other artists such as Céline Dion, who recorded "Michael's Song" (La ballade de Michel) and "Listen to the Magic Man" ("Dans La Main D'un Magicien") for the film The Peanut Butter Solution (1985), both co-written by Eddy Marnay [detailed biography in French Wikipedia]; Tom Robinson, who recorded "Closing a Door" (Cabaret '79, 1982) and "Love Comes" (North by Northwest, 1982); and Petula Clark. His first two albums became hits in Japan and are available on CD only as Japanese re-releases. He is abundantly represented on the Japanese-language internet (search on ルイス･フューレイ). A CD version of The Sky is Falling was released in France.

He is the brother of Canadian playwright/actor/pianist Richard Greenblatt, author of the major hit play 2 Pianos, 4 Hands.

== Discography ==
=== Albums ===
- Lewis Furey, 1975
- The Humours of Lewis Furey, 1976
- The Sky is Falling, 1979
- Carole Laure/Lewis Furey Fantastica, 1980
- Carole Laure/Lewis Furey Enregistrement Public au Théâtre de la Porte Saint-Martin, 1982
- Carole Laure/Lewis Furey Night Magic, 1985
- "Haunted By Brahms", 2017/2018

=== Singles ===
- Lewis Furey: Lewis is crazy/ What a sad summer, Gamma, 1972 (Canada)
- Lewis Furey: Hustler's tango / Last night, A & M, 1975 (USA)
- Lewis Furey: Lullaby / Who's got the bag, A & M, 1976 (USA)
- Lewis Furey: Top ten sexes, A & M, 1976 (USA)
- Lewis Furey: Waiting on you / The sky is falling, Aquarius, 1978 (Canada)
- Lewis Furey& Carole Laure: See you Monday, RCA / Saravah, 1979 (original soundtrack of the film Au revoir... à lundi) (France)
- Lewis Furey& Carole Laure: Fantastica / What's wrong with me, RCA / Saravah, 1980 (original soundtrack of the film Fantastica) (France)
- Lewis Furey& Carole Laure: I should have known better / Slowly, I married her, RCA / Saravah, 1982 (France)
- Lewis Furey& Carole Laure: Fire / Angel eyes, RCA / Saravah, 1985 (original soundtrack of the film Night Magic) (France)

=== Participations ===
- 2007: Plaza Musique, L'amour et l'Occident, vocals on I Want To Be Your Friend

== Filmography ==
- Normande (La Tête de Normande St-Onge), 1975 (composer)
- The Angel and the Woman (L'Ange et la femme), 1977 (composer; actor)
- The Rubber Gun, 1977 (composer)
- Jacob Two-Two Meets the Hooded Fang, 1978 (composer)
- Bye, See You Monday (Au revoir à lundi), 1979 (composer; actor)
- Avec... le charme de Carole Laure, 1979 (appears as himself; TV)
- Agency, 1980 (composer)
- Fantastica, 1980 (composer; actor)
- Maria Chapdelaine, 1983 (composer)
- American Dreamer, 1984 (composer)
- Night Magic, 1985 (director; co-writer with Leonard Cohen; composer)
- The Peanut Butter Solution, 1985 (composer)
- Sauve-toi, Lola, 1986 (composer)
- Champagne for Two, Shades of Love series, 1987 (director; composer; TV)
- Lilac Dream, Shades of Love series, 1987 (composer; TV)
- Midnight Magic, Shades of Love series, 1987 (composer; TV)
- The Rose Café, Shades of Love series, 1987 (composer; TV)
- Sincerely, Violet, Shades of Love series, 1987 (composer; TV)
- The Emerald Tear, Shades of Love series, 1988 (composer; TV)
- Little White Lies, Shades of Love series, 1988 (composer; TV)
- The Man Who Guards the Greenhouse, Shades of Love series, 1988 (composer; TV)
- Moonlight Flight, Shades of Love series, 1988 (composer; TV)
- Shadow Dancing, 1988 (director)
- Sunset Court, Shades of Love series, 1988 (composer; TV)
- Tangerine Taxi, Shades of Love series, 1988 (composer; TV)
- Rats and Rabbits, 2000 (director; writer)
- Une fille dans l'azur, 2001 (composer; TV)
