= Yvon Barrette =

Canadian actor

Yvon Barrette (born September 16, 1946) is a Canadian actor from Alma, Quebec. He is best known for his portrayal of goaltender Denis Lemieux in 1977's Slap Shot.

Barrette trained at the National Theatre School of Canada but left in 1969 before graduation due to disagreement over the notion of creation the School had toward Quebec theatre, along with classmates Pierre Curzi, Paule Baillargeon and Gilbert Sicotte.

== Filmography ==
Year	Title	Role	Notes
1972	The True Nature of Bernadette (La Vraie nature de Bernadette)	St-Luc	
1973	Kamouraska		
1973	Les Allées de la terre		
1973	The Heavenly Bodies (Les Corps célestes)	Lorenzo	
1974	Bulldozer		
1974	Bingo	Un révolutionnarie	
1976	Jos Carbone	Jos Carbone	
1976	Let's Talk About Love (Parlez-nous d'amour)	Petite Pègre	
1977	Slap Shot	Denis Lemieux	
1977	Panic (Panique)		
2001	February 15, 1839 (15 février 1839)	Osias Primeau	
2015	The Sound of Trees (Le Bruit des arbres)	Car Mechanic / Garage Owner	
