= Poor Man's Pudding =

- Film poster
- Pudding chômeur
- Directed by: Gilles Carle
- Written by: Gilles Carle
- Produced by: Claude Gagnon; Yuri Yoshimura-Gagnon
- Starring: Chloé Sainte-Marie; Louis-Philippe Davignon-Daigneault; François Léveillé
- Cinematography: Pierre Letarte
- Edited by: Aube Foglia
- Music by: Jean Delorme
- Distributed by: Aska Films
- Release date: 1996
- Running time: 96 minutes
- Country: Canada
- Language: French

Poor Man's Pudding (French: Pudding chômeur) is a Canadian satirical comedy film, released in 1996. It was the final theatrical film directed by Gilles Carle.

== Plot ==
The film stars Chloé Sainte-Marie as Yo-Yo and Louis-Philippe Davignon-Daigneault as Alphonse, a New Age cult priestess in Montreal and her faith healer nephew. Events are set in motion when Alphonse's father Aristide (François Léveillé) threatens to commit suicide by jumping off the Jacques Cartier Bridge, leading to an ad hoc neighbourhood referendum on whether or not he should jump.

== Production ==
The film is in part a satire of the political and social rhetoric, on both sides of the issue, in the 1995 Quebec referendum on independence from Canada; Carle was inspired by, and singled out for special opprobrium in his film, the notion offered by some of his sovereignist friends that Quebec independence would in and of itself solve the social problems of poverty, unemployment and homelessness.

== Awards ==
The film garnered two Genie Award nominations at the 17th Genie Awards in 1996, in the categories of Best Screenplay (Carle) and Best Costume Design (Denis Sperdouklis).
