= The Angel and the Woman =

- L'Ange et la femme
- Directed by: Gilles Carle
- Written by: Gilles Carle
- Produced by: Robert Lantos; Stephen J. Roth
- Starring: Carole Laure; Lewis Furey; Stephen Lack
- Cinematography: François Protat
- Edited by: Ophera Hallis
- Music by: Lewis Furey; John Lissauer
- Production company: Films RSL
- Release date: April 7, 1977
- Running time: 88 minutes
- Country: Canada
- Languages: French; English
- Budget: $75,000

The Angel and the Woman (French: L'Ange et la femme) is a 1977 Canadian fantasy romance film written and directed by Gilles Carle and starring Carole Laure, Lewis Furey, and Stephen Lack. The film follows a woman who, after being brutally shot, dies in the snow and is resurrected by an angel who falls in love with her and eventually teaches her how to incinerate objects with her mind. The film is shot entirely in black-and-white and attracted some controversy due to its explicit unsimulated sex scenes between the two leads.

== Cast ==
- Carole Laure as Girl
- Lewis Furey as Angel Gabrielle
- Jean Comptois as Bandit
- Joe Elsnor as Bandit
- Conrad Peterson as Bandit
- Stephen J. Roth as Bandit
- Stephen Lack as Guest
- Pierre Giard as Guest
- Stefan Wohl as Guest
- David Caissey as Guest
- Réal Belzé-Belval as Guest
- J. Léo Gagnon as Father
- Jeanne Gagnon as Mother
- David Shimo as Chauffeur
- Georges Lévesque as Valet

== Production ==
This film contains non-simulated sexual acts (vaginal penetration, fellatio and ejaculation) between the two main actors, Carole Laure and Lewis Furey. It is a fact that at the beginning of filming Laure was director Gilles Carle's girlfriend. In Carle's intentions, the sex act between Laure and Furey was supposed to remain a one-off, but in fact the two actors fell in love during filming, moved in together and later married.

== See also ==
- List of films about angels
