= The Heavenly Bodies (film) =

- French: Les Corps célestes
- Directed by: Gilles Carle
- Written by: Gilles Carle; Arthur Lamothe
- Produced by: Mag Bodard; Pierre Lamy
- Starring: Donald Pilon; Micheline Lanctôt; Carole Laure
- Cinematography: Jean-Claude Labrecque
- Edited by: Renée Lichtig
- Music by: Philippe Sarde
- Production company: Les Productions Carle-Lamy
- Release date: September 20, 1973
- Running time: 104 min.
- Countries: Canada; France
- Language: French

The Heavenly Bodies (French: Les Corps célestes) is a Canadian-French comedy film, directed and co-written by Gilles Carle and released in 1973. The film stars Donald Pilon as Desmond, a pimp in Quebec in 1938 who moves to a rural mining town with a group of prostitutes to open a brothel in a decrepit old hotel, amid the early warning signs about the approaching outbreak of World War II.

The cast also includes Micheline Lanctôt, Carole Laure, Jacques Dufilho and Yvon Barrette.

Due to the film's temporal setting, recordings of Adolf Hitler are heard on radio broadcasts at various points in the film, although the conclusion transcends time to communicate a message of hope by incorporating audio clips of much later political figures such as John F. Kennedy and Pierre Trudeau.

The film was positively reviewed by critics. Dane Lanken of the Montreal Gazette called it Carle's best film, while critics in France reviewed the film favourably but called it a creative step down from Carle's The Death of a Lumberjack (Le Mort d'un bûcheron). However, the film fared poorly with audiences, making far less at the box office than The Death of a Lumberjack.
