= The Rape of a Sweet Young Girl =

- French: Le Viol d'une jeune fille douce
- Directed by: Gilles Carle
- Written by: Gilles Carle
- Produced by: Pierre Lamy; André Lamy
- Starring: Julie Lachapelle; Katerine Mousseau; Daniel Pilon; Donald Pilon; André Gagnon
- Cinematography: Bernard Chentrier
- Edited by: Yves Langlois
- Music by: Pierre F. Brault
- Production company: Onyx Films
- Release date: December 25, 1968
- Running time: 85 minutes
- Country: Canada
- Language: French
- Budget: $45,000

The Rape of a Sweet Young Girl (French: Le Viol d'une jeune fille douce) is a 1968 Canadian satirical comedy-drama film written and directed by Gilles Carle. The film stars Julie Lachapelle as Julie, a young sexually liberated woman who gets pregnant from a casual but consensual sexual encounter and wrestles with whether to have the baby or go for an abortion, while her older brothers Raphaël (Daniel Pilon), Gabriel (Donald Pilon) and Joachim (André Gagnon) decide, without listening to Julie's own perspective, that she has been raped and set off to find the "assailant", and themselves end up committing rape against another young woman.

Following its Canadian theatrical premiere in 1968, the film was screened at the 18th Berlin Film Festival in 1968 as part of Young Canadian Film, a lineup of films by emerging Canadian filmmakers, and in the Director's Fortnight stream at the 1969 Cannes Film Festival.

== Plot ==
Julie (Julie Lachapelle) is a young adult and artist living in Montreal. Bored, she feels that nothing ever happens in her life. During a visit to the doctor (Claude Jutra), she learns she is pregnant. She arranges a meeting with an abortionist but backs out at the last minute.

Throughout her pregnancy, we follow Julie’s daily life as she moves between various lovers and friends. There is Katerine (Katherine Mousseau), her friend and roommate, who leaves her for a new lover but eventually returns when that relationship ends; and Jacques (Jacques Cohen), her Moroccan boyfriend, who also eventually abandons her. Her brothers—Gabriel (Donald Pilon), Raphaël (Daniel Pilon), and Joachim (André Gagnon)—then come to her rescue. Intent on wiping away Julie’s artistic ideals, they destroy the eccentric objects in her apartment to put an end to her life as an artist. They want to track down the child's father and teach him a lesson. Julie, who does not know who the father is, is forced by her brothers to speak and improvises a story: he is French and drives a blue Jaguar. The Lachapelle brothers, driving a convertible Camaro, scour the roads of Quebec in search of this supposed father, watched by an indifferent, barely concerned Julie. Along the way, they pick up Marie, a reticent hitchhiker whom the brothers rape in a roadside field before continuing their journey. Upon arriving at the home of the supposed father, Joachim, Gabriel, and Raphaël beat him severely without even explaining their actions.

Back in Montreal, Julie’s child, named Xanthippe, is now two months old. She considers the option of putting her baby up for adoption but, once again, backs out after meeting a few prospective parents and resolves to raise the child herself, alongside her partner Tancrède, in a new apartment she decorates to her own taste.

== Production ==
The film was shot on the weekends in 16 millimeter on a budget of $45,000.
