= Chloé Sainte-Marie =

Canadian actress and singer

Chloé Sainte-Marie CM
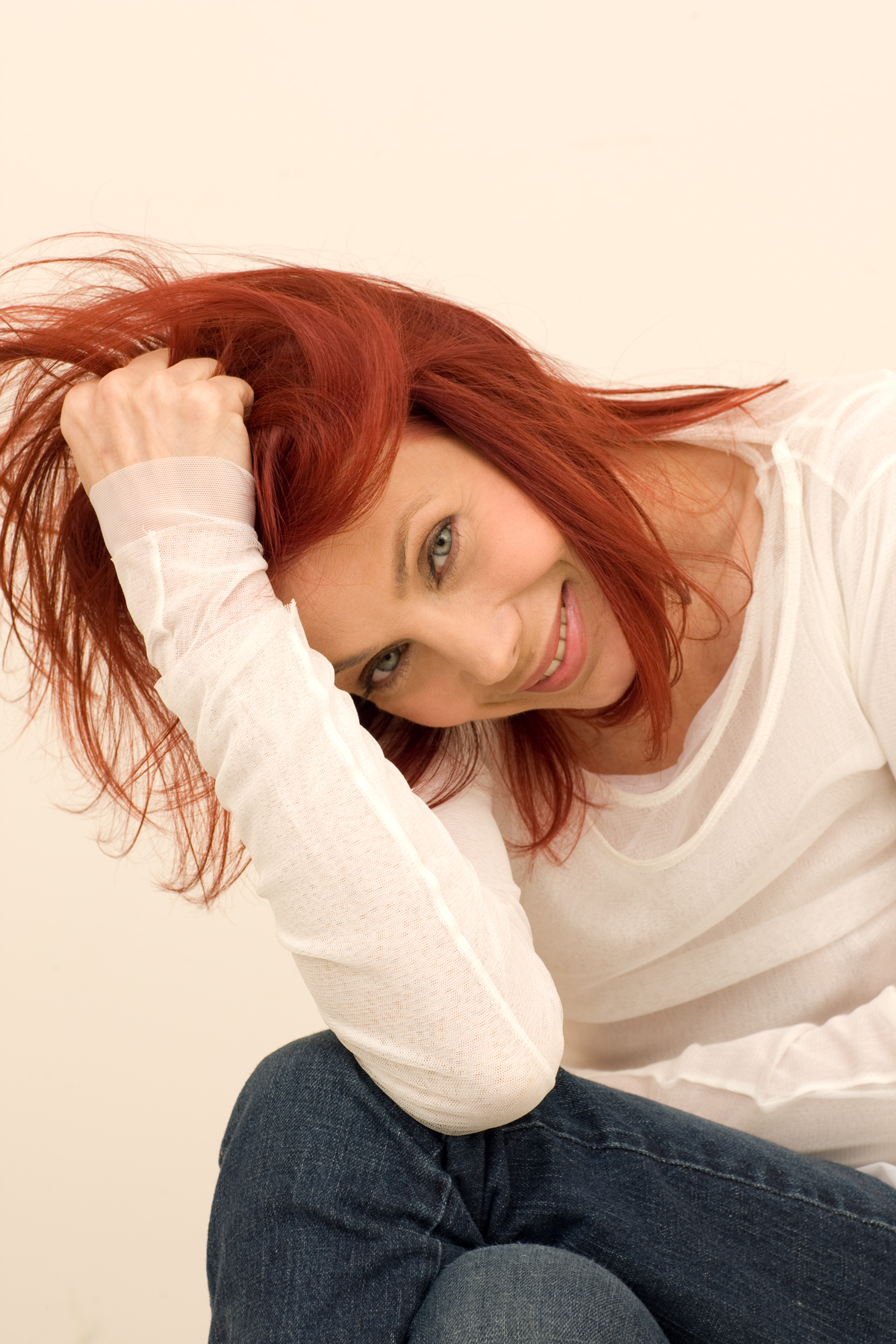

Background information
- Born: Marie-Aline Joyal; May 29, 1962 (age 63); Saint-Eugène, Quebec Canada
- Genres: Folk, pop, French-Canadian
- Occupations: Singer, actress
- Years active: 1982–present
- Label: GSI Musique
- Website: www.chloesaintemarie.com (in French)]

Marie-Aline Joyal (born May 29, 1962), known professionally as Chloé Sainte-Marie, is a Canadian actress, singer, activist, and official spokesperson for a network of natural caregivers in Québec.

== Biography ==
She is equally well known as the companion, muse, and caregiver of renowned Quebec filmmaker Gilles Carle, who was diagnosed with Parkinson's disease which, over 18 years, progressively reduced his ability to move or speak. Shortly before Gilles Carle's death in 2009, she opened the Maison Gilles-Carle, to accept chronically ill patients looking to live in a family style setting while allowing respite to their primary caregivers by sharing care for the residents amongst the caregivers.

In 2005, Charles Binamé and Amazone Film released the documentary Gilles Carle ou l'indomptable imaginaire (released in English as Gilles Carle, the untamable mind) where, as part of his exploration of the movie's subject, he chronicled Sainte-Marie's life as the companion and muse to Gilles Carle.

In 2009, she released her latest album Nitshisseniten e tshissenitamin (translated as: "I know that you know"), performed in its entirety in the Innu language. The words and music are from author-poet-composer-performer Philippe McKenzie, a fore-runner in the contemporary folk-Innu movement.

In 2012, she was interviewed on the Pénélope McQuade show about the Maison Gilles-Carle and how so many people came together to make the project a reality.

In 2024, she was appointed as a member of the Order of Canada, and in 2025 she received the Prix Denise-Pelletier.

She lives in Montreal.

== Awards ==
- 2003 : She received the Félix Award for Best Contemporary Folk Album for Je marche à toi (2002).
- 2003 : She received the Premier Prix du public (translated as: "Grand Prize from the public" at the Festival Alors ... Chante! (France).
- 2004 : She received the Révélation du festival (translated as: "Discovery of the Festival") prize at the Festival Pully.
- 2006 : For the album Je marche à toi (2002), she received, from the Académie Charles-Cros the prize Coup de cœur chanson - Année de la francophonie pour le Canada (translated as: "Song from the Heart - Canada's Year of Francophony").
- 2006 : She once again received a Félix Award, this time for Show of the Year - Performer for her show Parle-moi (2005).
- 2010 : On February 14, 2010, Les Artistes pour la paix honoured Chloé Sainte-Marie and designated her as Artiste pour la paix de l'année 2009 (translated as: "Artist for Peace for the year 2009").

== Filmography ==
- 1982 : Scandale
- 1984 : Cinéma Cinéma (as singer)
- 1984 : Le Parc (leading role)
- 1985 : O Picasso (as singer)
- 1985 : Le dernier havre (secondary role)
- 1986 : La Guêpe (film) (leading role)
- 1987 : Vive Québec (as singer)
- 1989 : La terre est une pizza (leading role)
- 1991 : La milliardaire (TV) (secondary role)
- 1992 : Miss Moscou (TV) (leading role)
- 1992 : La Postière aka "The Postmistress" (leading role)
- 1996 : Pudding chômeur aka "Bread Pudding" and "Poor Man's Pudding" (leading role)
- 1998 : La Penderie (leading role)
- 2005 : Gilles Carle ou l'indomptable imaginaire (as self)

== Discography ==
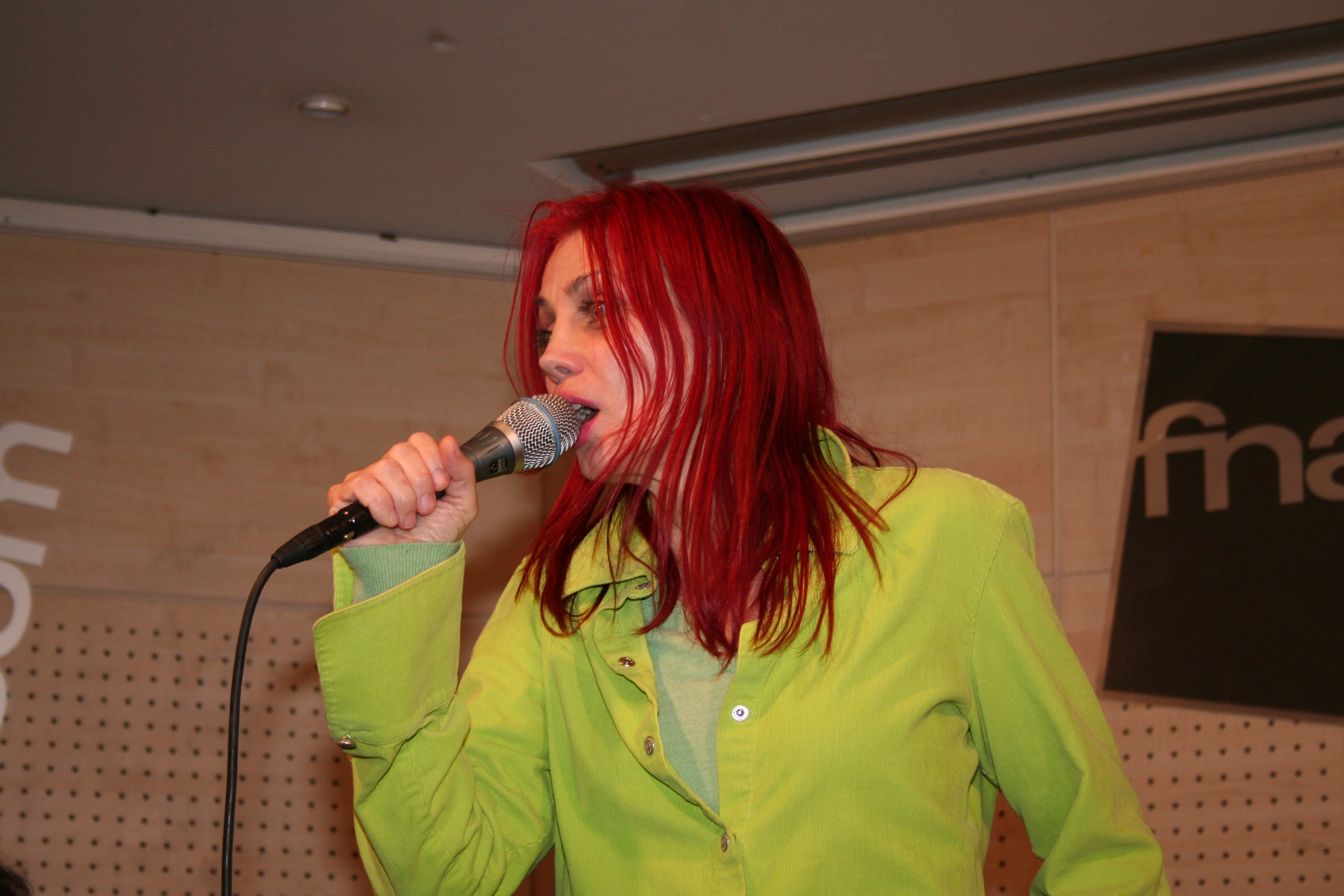
Chloé Sainte-Marie performing at the Fnac Saint-Lazare store in Paris, France in March, 2007.

- 1993 : L'Emploi de mon temps
- 1999 : Je pleure, tu pleures (ASIN B000GBEX0Q)
- 2002 : Je marche à toi (ASIN B000GBEX10)
- 2005 : Parle-moi (ASIN B000B6TS6U)
- 2008 : Mon amour en furie (ASIN B001KK6RGA) Boxed set containing the 3 albums Je pleure, tu pleures, Je marche à toi and Parle-moi
- 2009 : Nitshisseniten E Tshissenitamin (Je sais que tu sais) (ASIN B002M81UCK)
- 2014 : À La Croisée Des Silences
- 2022 : Maudit Silence
