= Eugène Chinic =

Canadian businessman and politician

The Hon. Guillaume-Eugène Chinic
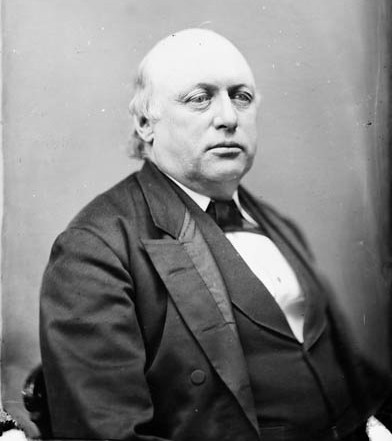

Senator for Gulf, Quebec
- In office April 10, 1873 – November 3, 1882
- Appointed by: John A. Macdonald
- Preceded by: Ulric-Joseph Tessier
- Succeeded by: Louis Robitaille

Personal details
- Born: October 26, 1818 Quebec City, Lower Canada
- Died: April 28, 1889 (aged 70) Quebec City, Quebec
- Resting place: Cimetière Notre-Dame-de-Belmont
- Party: Conservative

Guillaume-Eugène Chinic (October 26, 1818 – April 28, 1889) was a Canadian businessman and politician.

Born in Quebec City, he was one of the founders of the District Bank of Quebec.

In 1873, he was summoned to the Senate of Canada representing the senatorial division of Gulf, Quebec. He sat as a Conservative and resigned in 1882.

He is buried in Cimetière Notre-Dame-de-Belmont.
