= Dans la main d'un magicien =

Single by Celine Dion

from the album Opération beurre de pinottes soundtrack
- Language: French
- B-side: "CUE 17 à instrumental"
- Released: December 1985
- Genre: Pop
- Length: 3:20
- Label: TBS; Epic
- Songwriters: Lewis Furey; Eddy Marnay
- Producer: Lewis Furey

Celine Dion singles chronology
"C'est pour vivre" (1985)	"Dans la main d'un magicien" (1985)	"La ballade de Michel" (1985)

"Dans la main d'un magicien" (lit. 'In the hand of a magic man') is a song by Canadian singer Celine Dion, written by Lewis Furey and Eddy Marnay. It was released in December 1985 in Quebec, Canada, as the lead single from the soundtrack of the film Opération beurre de pinottes. Dion also recorded an English-language version, with lyrics by Howard Forman and Furey, titled "Listen to the Magic Man", for which she made her first music video. "Listen to the Magic Man" is notable as her first English-language studio recording.

== Background ==
The soundtrack album The Peanut Butter Solution / Opération beurre de pinottes includes both versions of the song, as well as two other Dion recordings: "La ballade de Michel" and its English-language counterpart "Michael's Song". Neither the French nor the English version of "Dans la main d'un magicien" was included on any of Dion's albums.

The track became officially available on CD for the first time in September 2006, included on a bonus disc packaged with Volume 1 of the Contes pour tous DVD box set, sold exclusively through Imavision's website.

In November 2014, "Dans la main d'un magicien" and "Listen to the Magic Man" were released digitally worldwide.

== Formats and track listing ==
- Canadian 7-inch single
1. "Dans la main d'un magicien" – 3:20
2. "CUE 17 à instrumental" (instrumental) – 2:09
- Canadian 7-inch single
1. "Listen to the Magic Man" – 3:20
2. "Michael's Song" – 3:00
