= The Great Chess Movie =

1982 film

- French: Jouer sa vie
- Directed by: Gilles Carle; Camille Coudari
- Starring: Bobby Fischer; Viktor Korchnoi; Anatoly Karpov; Ljubomir Ljubojević; Fernando Arrabal!
- Production company: National Film Board of Canada
- Release date: 1982
- Running time: 80 minutes
- Country: Canada
- Language: French

The Great Chess Movie (French: Jouer sa vie) is a 1982 Canadian film directed by Gilles Carle and Camille Coudari, starring Bobby Fischer, Viktor Korchnoi, Anatoly Karpov and Ljubomir Ljubojević among other notable chess players.

The 80-minute documentary is produced by the National Film Board of Canada (NFB).

The film was a Genie Award nominee for Best Documentary at the 4th Genie Awards in 1983. It also won the Best Canadian Short Film category at 1982 Montréal World Film Festival.
