= Carole Laure =

Canadian actress & singer (born 1948)

Carole Laure OC
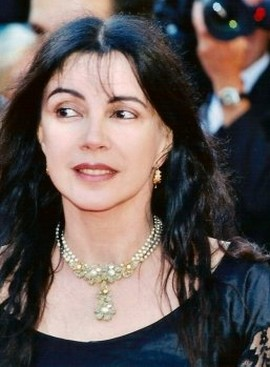
- Carole Laure at the 2002 Cannes Film Festival.
- Born: Carole Champagne; 5 August 1948 (age 78); Montreal, Quebec, Canada
- Other names: Carol Laure, Carole Lord
- Spouse: Lewis Furey
- Children: 2

Carole Laure OC (born Carole Champagne; August 5, 1948) is a Canadian singer, actress, and filmmaker from Quebec.

== Early life ==
Laure was born in Montreal in 1948. Both of her parents were killed in accident two weeks after her birth, and she was adopted by a family in Shawinigan. She was raised Roman Catholic, and attended a Ursuline convent, where she learned piano.

== Career ==
=== Singing career ===
Laure debuted as a singer on the album Alibis in 1978.

In 1989, she devoted an acoustic-oriented bilingual album, Western Shadows, to country and western standards. The album featured cover versions of Tammy Wynette's "Stand by Your Man", Phil Spector's "To Know Him Is to Love Him", Rosanne Cash's "Seven Year Ache", and Leonard Cohen's "Coming Back to You". The video for "Danse avant de tomber" (a cover of Boris Bergman's French adaptation of Doc Pomus' "Save the Last Dance for Me") featured dancer Louise Lecavalier of the internationally famous Québec contemporary dance troupe La La La Human Steps.

For her 1991 album She Says Move On, she recorded a cover version of Jimi Hendrix's "Purple Haze".

She switched from acoustic to electronic music on her 1997 French-language album Sentiments naturels. The album featured club-oriented genres such as techno, house, and trip hop, and collaborators included Dimitri from Paris, Mirwais, Shazz, DJ Cam, and Todd Terry. Laure was also named in the songwriting credits.

=== Acting career ===
Laure is also a film actress, appearing in a number of Canadian-produced films, including the controversial 1974 release by Dušan Makavejev Sweet Movie, which was notable for both its sexual explicitness and scatology. Laure and Furey were frequent co-stars in the films of Gilles Carle, most notably, L'Ange et la femme (1977) and Fantastica (1980). She also stars alongside Pelé, Sylvester Stallone and Michael Caine in the 1981 film Escape to Victory. She acted in several movies with Nick Mancuso, which included Maria Chapdelaine (1983), Heartbreakers (1984), and Night Magic (1985).

== Personal life ==
Throughout most of her career, Carole Laure primarily collaborated with Anglophone singer, songwriter, producer, and director Lewis Furey, whom she met in 1977 and who later became her husband.

== Honours ==
Laure was appointed an Officer of the Order of Canada in 2013, "For her international career as an actress, singer, director and dancer."

== Discography ==
=== Albums ===
- Alibis (1978)
- Carole Laure/Lewis Furey Fantastica (1980)
- Carole Laure/Lewis Furey Enregistrement public au Théâtre de la Porte Saint-Martin (1982)
- Carole Laure/Lewis Furey Night Magic (1985)
- Western Shadows (1989)
- She Says Move On (1991)
- Sentiments naturels (1997)
- Collection Légende (1999)

=== Singles ===
- "J'ai une chanson" (1978)
- "See you Monday" (with Lewis Furey) (1979)
- "Fantastica" (with Lewis Furey) (1980)
- "I should have known / Slowly, I married her" (with Lewis Furey) (1982)
- "Danse avant de tomber" (1989)
- "Anybody with the Blues" (1990)
- "She says move on" (1991)
- "Perds ton temps" (1992)
- "Mirage Geisho" (New version) (1993)
- "Passe de toi" (1996)
- "Sentiments naturels" (1997)
- "Dormir" (Sampler) (1997)

== Filmography ==
(mainly French language)

- Mon enfance à Montréal (1971)
- The Apprentice (Fleur bleue) (1971) as Suzanne
- IXE-13 (1972) as Shaïra
- Series 4 (1972)
- La Porteuse de pain (TV miniseries) (1973) as Marie Harmant
- La Mort d'un bûcheron (1973) as Marie Chapdeleine
- The Heavenly Bodies (Les Corps célestes) (1973) as Rose-Marie
- Sweet Movie (1974) as Miss Monde 1984 / Miss Canada
- La Tête de Normande St-Onge (1975) as Normande St-Onge
- A Thousand Moons (1975)
- Né pour l'enfer (Born for Hell) (1976) as Amy
- Strange Shadows in an Empty Room (1976) as Louise Saitta
- A Pacemaker and a Sidecar (L'Eau chaude, l'eau frette) (1976) as Amoureuse
- The Angel and the Woman (L'Ange et la femme) (1977) as Girl
- La Menace (1977) as Julie Manet, a Canadian Girl
- Préparez vos mouchoirs (Get Out Your Handkerchiefs) (1977) as Solange
- La Jument vapeur (1978) as Armelle Bertrand
- Inside Out (1979)
- Au revoir à lundi (1979) as Lucie Leblanc
- Fantastica (1980) as Lorca
- Asphalte (1981) as Juliette Delors
- Un assassin qui passe (1981) as Pauline Klein
- Escape to Victory (Victory) (1981) as Renee - The French
- Croque la vie (1981) as Thérèse
- Maria Chapdelaine (1983) as Maria Chapdelaine
- À mort l'arbitre (1984) as Martine
- Stress (1984) as Nathalie
- Heartbreakers (1984) as Liliane
- The Surrogate (1984) as Anouk Van Derlin
- Night Magic (1985) as Judy
- Drôle de samedi (1985) as Véronique
- Sauve-toi, Lola (1986) as Lola
- Sweet Country (1987) as Eva
- La Nuit avec Hortense (1988) as Hortense
- La Vie en couleurs (TV) (1989) as Laura
- Palace (TV miniseries) (1989) as La cliente à la mouche / Sylvie, la femme du service des rêves
- Thank You Satan (1989) as France Monnier
- Beau fixe sur Cormeilles (1989)
- Les Aventuriers d'Eden River (Flight from Justice) (TV) (1993) as Dr. Ann Stephens
- Elles ne pensent qu'à ça... (1994) as Jess
- Rats and Rabbits (2000) as Rita
- Les Fils de Marie (2002) as Marie
- Primitifs (2002)
- The Beautiful Beast (La Belle bête) (2006) as Louise
- La Capture (Director, 2007)
- Love Project (Love Projet) — 2014, director
