= Fantastica (1980 film) =

1980 film by Gilles Carle

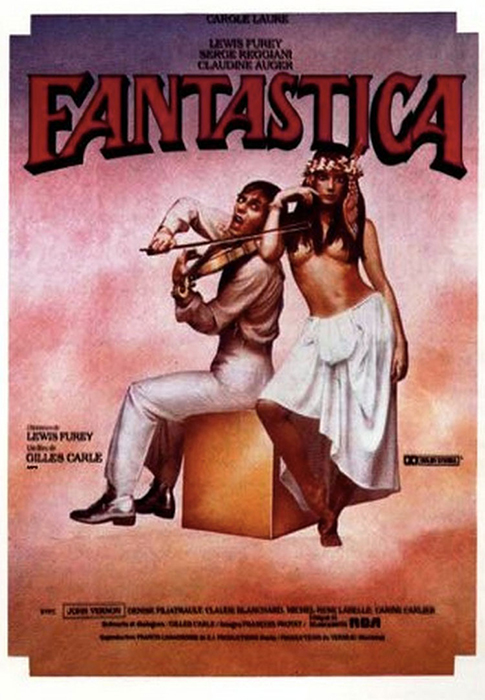
- Film poster
- Directed by: Gilles Carle
- Written by: Gilles Carle
- Produced by: Eric Fournier
- Starring: Carole Laure; Lewis Furey; Serge Reggiani; Claudine Auger
- Cinematography: François Protat
- Edited by: Hugues Darmois
- Music by: Lewis Furey
- Production company: E.I. Productions; Les Productions du Verseau
- Distributed by: Mutual Films (Canada); Gaumont Distribution (France)
- Release date: 31 October 1980
- Running time: 110 minutes
- Countries: Canada; France
- Language: French

Fantastica is a 1980 French-language musical film written and directed by Gilles Carle, and featuring songs by Lewis Furey. It stars Furey, Carole Laure, Serge Reggiani, Claudine Auger and John Vernon. It was a Canadian and French co-production, and was the opening film of the 1980 Cannes Film Festival.

== Plot summary ==
"An actress in a traveling musical revue is involved with the show's director until she meets and falls for an aging ecological activist. He too is drawn to her, and together they try to stop a factory from being built over an old-growth forest."

== Cast ==
- Carole Laure as Lorca
- Lewis Furey as Paul
- Serge Reggiani as Euclide Brown
- Claudine Auger as Johanne McPherson
- John Vernon as Jim McPherson
- Denise Filiatrault as Emma
- Claude Blanchard as Hector
- Michel-René Labelle as Louis
- Carine Carlier as Liliane
- Donald Pilon as Georges
- Gilbert Sicotte as Julien
- François Léveillé as Herve
- François Pratte as Willie
- Pierre Fauteux as Zacharie
- Guy L'Écuyer as Pompier
- Nathalie Breuer as Nathalie
- Odette Peterson as Jeanne
- Michelle Poirier as Michelle
- Pierre Curzi as André
- Randy Vancourt as Jack

== Soundtrack album ==
Released in 1980 by Acapella Beaubec Musique, the album's catalogue number is AC-108. The French pressing's catalogue number is RSL-1085. All songs composed by Lewis Furey, and arranged by John Lissauer. The album is produced by Lewis Furey and John Lissauer. The lyrics were printed on the inner sleeve. The album was reissued in 2005 on CD by Mantra Records (Mantra 020 WM 330) in France only.

Side one

- Fantastica (Theme generique) [1:32]
- Funny Funny [2:30]
- Be My Baby Tonight [3:28]
- This Could Have Been The Song [3:38]
- Fantastica [3:12]
- Goodbye Love [2:27]

Side two

- What's Wrong With Me [3:24]
- Happy's In Town [3:16]
- Lorca In Three Movements [9:27]
- This Could Have Been The Song (piano duo) [2:55]

== Release ==
An English-language dialogue dubbed version of the film was broadcast on Superchannel, a pay-TV channel in western Canada in the early 1980s.

== Reception ==
The film was seen by 116,885 people in France.

=== Accolades ===
Institution	Year	Category	Nominee	Result	Ref.
Cannes Film Festival	1980	Palme d'Or	Gilles Carle	Nominated	
Genie Awards	1981	Best Actor	Lewis Furey	Nominated	
Genie Awards	1981	Best Cinematography	François Protat	Nominated	
Genie Awards	1981	Best Art Direction	Jocelyn Joly, Anne Pritchard	Nominated	
Genie Awards	1981	Best Costume Design	Anne Pritchard	Won	

== Works cited ==
- Marshall, Bill (2001). Quebec National Cinema. McGill–Queen's University Press. ISBN 0-7735-2103-8.
