= Normande (film) =

- French: La Tête de Normande St-Onge
- Directed by: Gilles Carle
- Written by: Ben Barzman
- Produced by: Pierre Lamy
- Starring: Carole Laure; Raymond Cloutier; Reynald Bouchard
- Cinematography: François Protat
- Edited by: Gilles Carle; Avdé Chiriaeff
- Music by: Lewis Furey
- Distributed by: Cinepix; Les Productions Carle-Lamy
- Release date: August 25, 1975
- Running time: 103 minutes
- Country: Canada
- Language: French

Normande (French: La Tête de Normande St-Onge) is a 1975 Canadian drama film from Quebec, directed by Gilles Carle. The film stars Carole Laure as the titular Normande St-Onge, a woman who is slowly losing her grip on reality as her difficult circumstances lead her to retreat into a fantasy world.

The film's cast also includes Raymond Cloutier, Reynald Bouchard, Carmen Giroux, Jean-Pierre Bergeron and Denys Arcand.

Lewis Furey won the Canadian Film Award for Best Musical Score at the 27th Canadian Film Awards for his work on the film. The film was also a nominee for Best Feature Film, but did not win.
