= Two's a Crowd (TV series) =

Canadian sitcom

- Also known as: Jamais deux sans toi Les Héritiers Duval
- Created by: Guy Fournier
- Written by: Guy Fournier
- Directed by: Rolland Guay; Geneviève Houle; Pierre-Jean Cuillerrier; Céline Hallée; Royal Marcoux; Yves Mathieu
- Starring: Jean Besré; Angèle Coutu
- Country of origin: Canada
- Original language: French
- No. of seasons: 5
- No. of episodes: 231

Original release
- Network: Télévision de Radio-Canada; CBC Television
- Release: 28 September 1977 – 7 December 1992

Two's a Crowd (French: Jamais deux sans toi) is a Canadian television sitcom, which aired in French on Télévision de Radio-Canada from 1977 to 1980 and from 1990 to 1992, and in English on CBC Television in 1978.

== Premise ==
The series starred Jean Besré and Angèle Coutu as Rémi and Francine Duval, an apparently incompatible married couple who love each other despite their differences, and Stéphane L'Écuyer and Valérie Gagné as their children Christian and Dominique. The cast also included Micheline Lanctôt and Donald Pilon, as well as Serge Thériault as one of the first gay characters in a Quebec television series.

The series was revived by Radio-Canada in 1990, airing until 1992. Cast additions at this time included Antoine Durand as the adult Christian, although Valérie Gagné retained the role of Dominique.

A sequel series titled Les Héritiers Duval aired in 1995 and 1996.
