= Onyx Films =

Film Production Business

Onyx Films was a film production business in Montreal, Quebec, Canada. It was founded in 1962 by Pierre Lamy and his brother André Lamy. Their films include Le Viol d'une jeune fille douce ('The Rape of a Sweet Young Girl'), a satire. Gilles Carle worked with the film company on several productions.

The Canadian Post Office and Royal Canadian Mounted Police had contracts with Onyx to make films in 1971.

The 2010 documentary film La vie privée d'Onyx ('The Very Private Affair of Onyx') directed by Denys Desjardins is about the company's history.

== Filmography ==
- Pas de vacances pour les idoles ('No Vacation for Idols') (1965)
- Le Viol d'une jeune fille douce ('The Rape of a Sweet Young Girl') (1968)
- Deux femmes en or ('Two Golden Women') (1970)
- Les Males ('The Males') (1971)
- La Feuille d'Erable ('The Maple Leaf') (1971), a series directed by Aimée Danis, Gilles Carle, and other
- All Ears to Gaspé (1974), a documentary film about Quebec's Gaspé region. The film documents the lifestyle of the Gaspesie people in the area of fishing and tourism as well as the departure of young people.
- Carnaval d'hiver de Québec
