= Bae Yong-kyun =

South Korean artist (born 1951)

- Born: 1951 (age 73–74); Daegu, South Korea
- Occupation(s): film director, painter, professor
- Known for: Why Has Bodhi-Dharma Left for the East?

- Bae Yong-kyun
- Hangul: 배용균
- Hanja: 裵鏞均
- RR: Bae Yonggyun
- MR: Pae Yonggyun

Bae Yong-Kyun (Korean: 배용균; born 1951) is a South Korean film director, painter, and professor. He is best known for his 1989 film Why Has Bodhi-Dharma Left for the East?

== Life and career ==
Bae is a painter by training and a graduate of the University of Paris.

In the early 1980s, Bae began production on the film Why Has Bodhi-Dharma Left for the East? without any experience in the Korean film industry and using amateur actors. Production lasted for almost ten years, with Bae directing, writing, filming, editing and financing the film by himself. The film won the Golden Leopard at the Locarno Film Festival and was screened in the Un Certain Regard section at the 1989 Cannes Film Festival. It was the first South Korean film to receive theatrical distribution in the United States.

Bae wrote and directed one other film, The People in White (Korean: 검으나 땅에 희나 백성, romanized: Geomeuna dange huina baekseong, 1995).

Until 2000 he taught painting at Catholic University of Daegu. He has not been seen in public since August 2001. However, in 2020 the Korean Film Archive reported that he had assisted them in a digital restoration of Why Has Bodhi-Dharma Left for the East?
