= Why Has Bodhi-Dharma Left for the East? =

- Theatrical release poster
- Hangul: 달마가 동쪽으로 간 까닭은?
- Hanja: 達磨가 東쪽으로 간 까닭은?
- RR: Dalmaga dongjjogeuro gan kkadalgeun?
- MR: Talmaga tongtchogŭro kan kkadalgŭn?
- Directed by: Bae Yong-kyun
- Written by: Bae Yong-kyun
- Produced by: Bae Yong-kyun Productions
- Starring: Lee Pan-yong; Sin Won-sop
- Cinematography: Bae Yong-kyun
- Edited by: Bae Yong-kyun
- Music by: Jin Gyu-yeong
- Distributed by: Bae Yong-kyun Productions
- Release date: September 23, 1989
- Running time: 145 minutes
- Country: South Korea
- Language: Korean

Why Has Bodhi-Dharma Left for the East? (Korean: 달마가 동쪽으로 간 까닭은?; RR: Dalmaga dongjjogeuro gan kkadalgeun?) is a 1989 South Korean film written, produced and directed by Bae Yong-kyun, a professor at Dongguk University in Seoul. Known principally as a painter, Bae spent seven years making this film with one camera and editing it by hand. The film was screened in the Un Certain Regard section at the 1989 Cannes Film Festival. It was the first South Korean film to receive a theater release in the United States. The US distributor Milestone Films premiered the film in New York City on September 24, 1993 and then expanded to more than 30 cities.

== Plot ==
A meditative film dealing with Seon Buddhist views on life, Why Has Bodhi-Dharma Left for the East? follows the lives of three Buddhist monks: an orphaned boy, an adult monk and an elderly monk.

This film is largely about two hwadu (koan): what was my original face before my mother and father were conceived? and, (in death) where does the master of my being go?

The film's title, though not explained literally in the film, is a reference to Bodhidharma, a sixth-century Buddhist monk from India who transmitted Zen to China.

The three main protagonists are Hae-jin, an orphaned boy; Ki-bong, a young monk, and Hye-gok, an elderly monk living at a remote monastery.

Hae-jin injures a bird while bathing. Its mate does not flee and stays around, as if to see what becomes of its mate. The boy takes the injured bird away to heal it, but it dies later in the film.

The film then cuts to a scene in which an ox breaks through a confining fence and escapes into the forest.

The abbot instructs a young monk (Ki-bong) to assist a Zen master living alone in the mountains. The young monk has renounced his life of hardship in search of peace and perfection.

The elderly master is a recluse, living in a monastery on a high mountain and has realized the vanity of knowledge. He mainly tries to communicate his way through the use of hwadu, or Buddhist riddles with no absolute answers. The first hwadu is "What was my original face before my father and mother were conceived?" The second is "When the moon takes over in your heart (that is, in enlightenment or death), where does the master of my being go?" He instructs the young monk to "hold the hwadu between his teeth" and solve them. In solving the riddles, the master tells the young monk that he will find an unshakeable peace.

The young monk goes into town to buy medicine for the master using money from alms from begging. He also visits his own blind mother, who is having a hard time tending to herself. The young monk returns to the monastery, disillusioned and appalled at his own selfishness in renouncing his destiny, which was to serve his mother and family.

He returns to the master and communicates his desire to go back to human society and embrace the filth of humanity. He is severely reprimanded by the master but the latter does not prevent him from leaving. The young monk leaves the monastery to return to his old life but is caught in a flash flood and nearly drowns. He is found by Hae-jin and rescued by his master.

When the young monk regains consciousness, the boy tells him that the master has been in meditation for quite a while and is severely ill. Ki-bong realizes that the master has traded his own life to save him. Deeply moved, he visits the master, who extracts a promise from Ki-bong to perform his last rites as the old man wishes. His wish is for his body to be burned on top of the hill so that he can return to his original place.

News of a festival on the approaching full-moon day reaches Ki-bong, who wishes to attend it with the boy. Hye-gok, apparently feeling better, gives them leave. He also asks them to bring enough paraffin for him on their way back.

At the festival, Ki-bong and Hae-jin watch the enthralling dance, while it is made known that the dancer is none other than the old monk in another form. On a bright full-moon night, Hae-jin and Ki-bong return to the monastery but upon their return, they find that the master has died.

True to his promise, with the true meaning and meaninglessness of death, possession, desire and vanity dawning on him with every passing instant, Ki-bong places the corpse in a wooden chest and slowly starts a difficult climb up the hillside. He carries the chest on a firewood pack –- presumably the same pack the young monk had used at the beginning of the film to haul firewood –- to the monastery.

By nightfall, the young monk reaches the burial ground. He tries to light the pyre, but a light drizzle prevents a fire from getting started. He suddenly remembers the master's words about the paraffin, so he goes back to the monastery to collect it. He returns to the burial ground and sets fire to the coffin. He spends the night by the side of the burning body, tortured by his feelings and coming to the full realization of death.

Looking around the burning body, the ox and the young boy appear. Both seem transfixed by the blaze. Even the blind passions and foolishness of youth are subdued in death.

After the funeral pyre has burned down in the morning, the young monk kneels and sifts his fingers through the ashes. In this scene, the young monk fully encounters the true realization of death. He looks for something in the ashes and finds the last few remaining bones of his former master. The young monk collects these bones and grinds them to powder with a stone. He then walks through the forest, scattering the powdered bones over water, earth, trees and plants.

When the young monk scatters the old man's powdered bones, he returns the old man to his original place, as the master had said must happen. The young monk finally solves the hwadu and attains the unshakeable peace the master had spoken about. He returns to the monastery, tells Hae-jin to handle the master's few remaining possessions and leaves.

In the final sequence, the boy comes of age. In a play scene, he reenacts the previous night's event by burning the old man's remaining effects. He does in miniature what the young monk did the night before. Through this act, the boy remembers the old man's teachings and comes to understand the nature of impermanence. He wakes up the next day and goes to the stream to collect water. As usual, the dead bird's companion chirps to distract him, but this time the boy fails to notice it.

Understanding impermanence, his education is complete. He enters the master's room and closes the door. An old master has died and the boy has succeeded him. The bird flies away, liberated. The wandering ox (which had always been shown before in shadow) returns with a man walking beside him in sunlight.

== Awards ==
- 1989 Locarno International Film Festival, the Golden Leopard (Best Film) and Prize of the Ecumenical Jury

== See also ==
- Korean Buddhism

== Bibliography ==
- Brennan, Sandra. "Why Has Bodhi-Dharma Left for the East?". Allmovie.
- Hartzell, Adam. "Why Has Bodhi-Dharma Left for the East?". koreanfilm.org.
- "What is the Reason Why Bodhidharma Went to the Eas...(1989)". KMDb Korean Movie Database.
