= Mambaye Coulibaly =

Malian film director, composer and film editor (1957–2015)

Mambanye Coulibaly
- Born: 2 May 1957; Kayes, Mali
- Died: 7 February 2015 (aged 57); Kayes, Mali
- Occupation: Film director
- Notable work: La Geste de Ségou!

Mambaye Coulibaly (1957–2015) was a Malian film director, who pioneered animation in African cinema.

== Life ==
Mambaye Coulibaly was born on 2 May 1957 in Kayes. After studying law, he turned to film in 1987. La Geste de Ségou! (1989), for which Coulibaly also wrote the music, was an animated short film inspired by historical events in the Bambara Empire of Ségou. The Ivorian playwright Werewere Liking designed puppets for the film.

In 1996 Coulibaly started working on a feature-length animation project, Le Pouvoir de Ségou, a project relaunched in 2009 as part of the Euromédiatoon project. Unfortunately long-term illness prevented the film's completion.

== Death ==
Coulibaly died on 7 February 2015 at Kayes.

== Films ==
- La Geste de Ségou!, 1989
