= Louis Robitaille (politician) =

Canadian politician

The Hon. Louis Robitaille

Senator for Gulf, Quebec
- In office February 8, 1883 – December 28, 1884
- Appointed by: John A. Macdonald
- Preceded by: Eugène Chinic
- Succeeded by: Théodore Robitaille

Personal details
- Born: October 30, 1836 Varennes, Lower Canada
- Died: September 4, 1888 (aged 51) Varennes, Quebec
- Party: Conservative

Louis Robitaille (October 30, 1836 – September 4, 1888) was a Canadian politician.

Born in Varennes, Lower Canada, he was a physician before being called to the Senate of Canada for the senatorial division of Gulf, Quebec in 1883. A Conservative, he served until 1884.
