= Camille Coudari =

Canadian chess player

Personal information
- Born: 29 July 1951 (age 75)

Chess career
- Country: Canada
- Title: International Master (1979)
- Peak rating: 2340 (July 1981)

Camille Coudari (born 29 July 1951), is a Canadian chess International Master (IM) (1979).

== Biography ==
In the 1970s Camille Coudari was one of the strongest Canadian chess players. Camille Coudari participated many times in Canadian Chess Championships and achieved the best result in 1972, when he ranked in the 5th place.

Camille Coudari played for Canada in the Chess Olympiad:

- In 1978, at second reserve board in the 23rd Chess Olympiad in Buenos Aires (+1, =2, -3).

Camille Coudari played for Canada in the World Student Team Chess Championship:

- In 1971, at fourth board in the 18th World Student Team Chess Championship in Mayagüez (+1, =2, -2) and won team bronze medal.

In 1979, Camille Coudari was awarded the FIDE International Master (IM) title.

In the 1970s Camille Coudari was a consultant for the Montreal Star chess column. In 1982 he was a one of director the movie about famous chess masters - The Great Chess Movie.
