= Louis Robitaille (dancer) =

- Born: December 21, 1957 (age 68); Montreal, Quebec
- Occupations: Dancer, artistic director
- Years active: 1974 - present
- Career
- Former groups: Les Ballets Jazz de Montreal, Les Grands Ballets Canadiens, Compagnie de danse Eddy Toussaint
- Dances: Ballet

Louis Robitaille, OC CQ (born December 21, 1957) is a Canadian ballet dancer and artistic director. He was discovered at a high school dance performance and received a scholarship to train at Les Ballets Jazz de Montreal. He danced with Anik Bissonnette in Eddy Toussaint's dance company, where they garnered acclaim. He also danced with Les Grands Ballets Canadiens as a principal dancer.

He became the artistic director of Les Ballets Jazz de Montreal in 1998 and held that title until 2020. During his tenure, he oversaw a re-visioning of the company. He was made an Officer of the Order of Canada in 1995 and a Knight of the National Order of Quebec in 1996.

== Early life and dance education ==
Robitaille was born in Montreal, Quebec on December 21, 1957. He was discovered when he performed at a high school dance performance. A physical education teacher named Peter George saw his ability and arranged for Robitaille to attend Les Ballets Jazz de Montreal's summer program on a scholarship.

He joined Compagnie de danse Eddy Toussaint in 1974 and studied under Olga Merinova and William Griffith.

== Dance career ==
In 1978 Robitaille was chosen for the title role in Les Grands Ballets Canadiens’ production of Icare.

Robitaille gained greater fame when he partnered with Anik Bissonnette. Their first dance together was Eddy Toussaint's Un Simple Movement which won a gold medal at the Helsinki International Festival in 1984. Throughout the 1980s they travelled together to Europe, the United States and Australia, as well as performing in Canada.

In 1988, Robitaille performed with Bissonnette in Swan Lake for the Odessa Ballet. In exchange, the Odessa Ballet allowed Odessa dancers to perform in Eddy Toussaint's choreography in Montreal.

In 1989, Robitaille joined Les Grands Ballets Canadiens as a principal dancer. He performed 35 roles with the company by choreographers like José Limón, George Balanchine and William Forsythe.

== Post-dance career ==
Robitaille became the artistic director of Jeune Ballet du Quebec in 1994 and also founded a chamber ballet group called Bande a Part. In 1995 he founded Dance-Theatre de Montreal with Anik Bissonnette.

In 1998, Robitaille was appointed artistic director of Les Ballets Jazz de Montreal. He changed the company's name to the hip bjm_danse to reflect his new direction for the company. He envisioned a more contemporary company that fused jazz with theatre, circus, visual arts and new music.

Robitaille increased the employment of the dancers in his company to 42 weeks but only toured with the company for 4 months. When picking choreographers for the company he favored Canadians who were on the verge of achieving international attention. He resigned as director in 2020.

== Personal life ==
Robitaille is married to Céline Cassone, a former dancer in Les Ballets Jazz de Montreal. They first met when Robitaille was a guest dance partner of Cassone's mother. They met again in the late 2000s and fell in love despite a 19-year age gap.

== Awards ==
Louis Robitaille won the Jacqueline Lemieux Prize in 1994. In 1995, he was made an Officer of the Order of Canada. In 1996, he was made a Knight of the National Order of Quebec.
