= Gilles Carle =

Canadian filmmaker and painter (1928-2009)

Gilles Carle OC GOQ
- Born: July 31, 1928; Maniwaki, Québec, Canada
- Died: November 28, 2009 (aged 81); Granby, Quebec, Canada
- Resting place: Notre Dame des Neiges Cemetery
- Education: École des beaux-arts de Montréal
- Occupations: Filmmaker (writer, director, producer)
- Years active: 1965–1999
- Partner(s): Chloé Sainte-Marie; Suzanne Valérie-Duchesne
- Children: Valérie Duchesne-Carle
- Family: Simon Julien (grandchild) Philippe Julien (grandchild)

Gilles Carle, OC GOQ (July 31, 1928 – November 28, 2009) was a Canadian filmmaker and painter, who was a key figure in the development of a commercial Quebec cinema.

== Life and career ==
Born in Maniwaki, Quebec and educated at École des beaux-arts de Montréal, Carle worked as a graphic artist and writer before he joined the National Film Board of Canada in 1960. His innovative debut feature, La Vie heureuse de Léopold Z., tracked the adventures of a snowplough operator during a madcap Christmas Eve. But after the NFB rejected several of his projects, he began working independently. In 1971 Carle joined forces with Pierre Lamy to form Les Productions Carle-Lamy, which produced Claude Jutra’s epic Kamouraska, Denys Arcand’s early features and all his early films. The quirkily paced, proto-feminist La Vraie Nature de Bernadette – widely regarded as his best film – and Le Mort d’un bûcheron eventually led to the more mainstream but graceful Les Plouffe and the epic love story Maria Chapdelaine, both classics of Quebec cinema. In 1972 Carle won the Canadian Film Award for best Director for his The True Nature of Bernadette.

His film 50 ans, celebrating the 50 years of the National Film Board of Canada, won the Short Film Palme d'Or at the 1989 Cannes Film Festival.

In 1990, he was awarded the Government of Quebec's Prix Albert-Tessier. In 1997, Carle received a Governor General's Performing Arts Award for Lifetime Artistic Achievement, Canada's highest honour in the performing arts. In 1998, he was made an Officer of the Order of Canada. In 2007, he was made a Grand Officer of the Ordre National du Quebec.

His late-life battle with Parkinson's disease was profiled by Charles Binamé in the 2005 documentary film Gilles Carle: The Untamable Mind (Gilles Carle ou l'indomptable imaginaire).

== Personal life ==
His companion of 27 years was the actress and singer Chloé Sainte-Marie.

=== Death ===
Carle died aged 81 on November 28, 2009, of complications from Parkinson's disease at the hospital in Granby, Quebec. Quebec Premier Jean Charest described him, at his death, as one of Quebec's most influential filmmakers. He was entombed at the Notre Dame des Neiges Cemetery in Montreal.

== Filmography ==
=== Feature films ===
- Solange dans nos campagnes - 1964, short film (re-released as part of the 1964 anthology film Trois Femmes)
- The Merry World of Leopold Z (La vie heureuse de Léopold Z) - 1965
- The Rape of a Sweet Young Girl (Le Viol d'une jeune fille douce) - 1968
- Red - 1970
- The Men (Les mâles) - 1971
- The True Nature of Bernadette (La vraie nature de Bernadette) - 1972
- The Heavenly Bodies (Les Corps célestes) - 1973
- The Death of a Lumberjack (La mort d'un bûcheron) - 1973
- Normande (La tête de Normande St-Onge) - 1975
- The Angel and the Woman (L'Ange et la femme) - 1977
- The Machine Age (L'âge de la machine) - 1977, short film
- Fantastica - 1980
- The Plouffe Family (Les Plouffe) - 1981
- Maria Chapdelaine - 1983
- La guêpe (aka Scalp - 1986
- The Postmistress (La postière) - 1992
- The Other Side of the Law - 1994
- Poor Man's Pudding (Pudding chômeur) - 1996

=== Documentaries ===
- Dimanche d'Amérique (Short film, 1961)
- Manger (Short film Co-Directed with Louis Portugais, 1961)
- Patinoire (Short film, 1962)
- Un air de famille (Short film, 1963)
- Natation (Short film, 1963)
- Patte mouillée (Short film, 1963)
- Percé on the Rocks (Short film, 1964)
- Place à Olivier Guimond (TV documentary, 1967)
- Place aux Jérolas (TV documentary, 1967)
- Le Québec à l'heure de l'Expo (Short film, 1967)
- Stéréo (Short film, 1970)
- Les chevaliers (1971)
- Les chevaux ont-ils des ailes? (Short film, 1975)
- Les masques (TV documentary aka Carle – masques, 1978)
- Jouer sa vie (Co-Directed with Camille Coudari, 1982)
- Cinéma, cinéma (Co-Directed with Werner Nold, 1985)
- Ô Picasso (Co-Directed with Camille Coudari, 1985)
- Vive Québec, cité française... ville francophone (1987)
- 50 ans (Short film, 1989)
- Le diable d'amérique (1990)
- Montréal off (Short film, 1991)
- Moi, j'me fais mon cinéma (1999)

=== Television ===
- Un hiver brûlant (TV episode of the series La feuille d'érable, 1971)
- A Thousand Moons (TV movie, 1976) (Created for TV series For the Record)
- Homecoming (TV movie aka Lonesome Riders, 1979)
- Le Crime d'Ovide Plouffe (TV miniseries Parts 1–4, 1983) (Parts 5–6 directed by Denys Arcand)
- Miss Moscou (TV movie, 1991)
- L'honneur des grandes neiges (TV movie, 1994) (Created for TV series Aventures dans le Grand Nord)
- Le sang du chasseur (TV movie, 1995) (Created for TV series Aventures dans le Grand Nord)
- Épopée en Amérique: une histoire populaire du Québec (TV series, 1997)
