= List of Canadian films of 1986 =

This is a list of Canadian films which were released in 1986:

Title	Director	Cast	Genre	Notes
The Adventure of Faustus Bidgood	Mike Jones	Robert Joy, Greg Malone, Mary Walsh, Cathy Jones		Featuring CODCO members
Abducted	Boon Collins	Dan Haggerty, Roberta Weiss	Thriller	
Anne Trister	Léa Pool	Albane Guilhe, Louise Marleau, Hugues Quester, Lucie Laurier	Drama	Genie Awards – Cinematography, Song; entered into the 36th Berlin International Film Festival
Bach and Broccoli (Bach et Bottine)	André Melançon	Mahée Paiement, Raymond Legault	Children's	
The Boy in Blue	Charles Jarrott	Nicolas Cage, Christopher Plummer, Cynthia Dale, David Naughton, Sean Sullivan	Drama	
Bullies	Paul Lynch	Jonathan Crombie, Janet-Laine Green, Olivia d'Abo	Action drama	
Care Bears Movie II: A New Generation	Dale Schott		Feature animation	
City in Panic	Robert Bouvier	David Adamson, Lee Ann Nestegard, Ed Chester, Peter Roberts	Horror	
The Climb	Donald Shebib	Bruce Greenwood, Kenneth Welsh, Ken Pogue	Adventure drama	
Confidential	Bruce Pittman	Neil Munro, August Schellenberg, Chapelle Jaffe	Crime drama, film noir	
Creole Connections	Alain d'Aix		Documentary	
Dancing in the Dark	Leon Marr	Martha Henry, Richard Monette, Rosemary Dunsmore, Neil Munro	Drama	
Debonair Dancers	Alison Nigh-Strelich		Documentary	
The Decline of the American Empire (Le Déclin de l'empire américain)	Denys Arcand	Rémy Girard, Dorothée Berryman, Pierre Curzi, Louise Portal, Gabriel Arcand, Dominique Michel	Drama	AV Preservation Trust Masterwork
Dream Tracks (Les Traces du rêve)	Jean-Daniel Lafond	Pierre Perrault	Documentary	
Equinox (Équinoxe)	Arthur Lamothe	Jacques Godin	Drama	
Every Dog's Guide to Complete Home Safety	Les Drew	Paul Brown, Harvey Atkin, Luba Goy, Henry Beckman	Animated short	
Evixion	Bashar Shbib		Docudrama	
Exit	Robert Ménard	Louise Marleau, Pierre Curzi, Michel Côté, Louise Portal	Drama	
Flying	Paul Lynch		Drama	
The Great Land of Small	Vojtěch Jasný	Karin Elkin, Michael J. Anderson, Ken Roberts	Children's film	From the Tales for All series
La Guêpe	Gilles Carle		Drama	
Hyper Sapien: People from Another Star	Peter R. Hunt		Science fiction	
I Need a Man Like You to Make My Dreams Come True	Kalli Paakspuu, Daria Stermac	Sheila Costick, Helen Porter, The Clichettes	Short comedy	
In the Shadow of the Wind (Les Fous de Bassan)	Yves Simoneau	Steve Banner, Marie Tifo, Lothaire Bluteau	Drama	Entered into the 37th Berlin International Film Festival
In This Corner	Atom Egoyan	Robert Wisden, Patrick Tierney	Drama	
Intimate Power (Pouvoir intime)	Yves Simoneau	Marie Tifo, Pierre Curzi, Jacques Godin, Robert Gravel	Crime drama	
Iron Eagle	Sidney J. Furie	Louis Gossett Jr., Jason Gedrick, Tim Thomerson, Larry B. Scott, Caroline Lagerfelt	Drama	Canada-Israel co-production made with U.S. financing
It's a Party!	Peg Campbell		Short comedy-drama	
John and the Missus	Gordon Pinsent	Gordon Pinsent, Jackie Burroughs, Timothy Webber	Drama	Screenplay by Gordon Pinsent based on his own novel.
Lost!	Peter Rowe	Kenneth Welsh, Helen Shaver, Michael Hogan	Drama	
Loyalties	Anne Wheeler	Susan Wooldridge, Kenneth Welsh, Tantoo Cardinal, Tom Jackson, Vera Martin	Drama	Anne Wheeler's first feature; Genie Award – Costumes; Canada-U.K. co-production
Meatballs III: Summer Job	George Mendeluk		Comedy	
The Morning Man (Un matin, une vie)	Danièle J. Suissa	Bruno Doyon, Kerrie Keane, Marc Strange	Crime drama	
Nion in the Kabaret de La Vita	Jeremy Podeswa	Ian "Nion" Wallace	Short drama	
?O, Zoo!: The Making of a Fiction Film	Philip Hoffman		Documentary	
The Park Is Mine	Steven Hilliard Stern		Drama	
Richard Cardinal: Cry from a Diary of a Métis Child	Alanis Obomsawin		Documentary	
Separate Vacations	Michael Anderson	David Naughton, Jennifer Dale, Lally Cadeau	Sex comedy	
Sitting in Limbo	John N. Smith	Patricia Dillon, Fabian Gibbs	National Film Board drama	
Sonia	Paule Baillargeon	Kim Yaroshevskaya, Paule Baillargeon, Lothaire Bluteau, Paul Buissonneau, Marc Messier, Guy Thauvette	Drama	
Sword of Gideon	Michael Anderson		Drama	
Tables of Content	Wendy Tilby		Animated short	
To Hurt and to Heal	Laura Sky		Documentary	
Toby McTeague	Jean-Claude Lord	Yannick Bisson, Winston Rekert	Drama	
Transit	Richard Roy	Michel Côté, Marie Laberge	Short drama	
Transitions	Colin Low, Tony Ianzelo		Documentary	
Where's Pete	Jim Purdy	Heath Lamberts, Nancy Beatty, Yannick Bisson	Short drama	
Zombie Nightmare	Jack Bravman		Horror	

== See also ==
- 1986 in Canada
- 1986 in Canadian television
