= 1986 Toronto International Film Festival =

Annual Canadian film festival

- Festival poster by Voytek Gorczynski
- Opening film: The Decline of the American Empire
- Location: Toronto, Ontario, Canada
- Hosted by: Toronto International Film Festival Group
- Festival date: September 4, 1986–September 13, 1986
- Language: English
- Website: tiff.net
- 1987 1985

The 11th Toronto International Film Festival (TIFF) took place in Toronto, Ontario, Canada between September 4 and September 13, 1986.

The Decline of the American Empire by Denys Arcand was selected as the opening film. It won both the People's Choice and Best Canadian Film awards at the festival. It was the first film ever to win both prizes, and the first Canadian film ever to win People's Choice.

== Awards ==
Award	Film	Director	Ref
People's Choice	The Decline of the American Empire	Denys Arcand	
Best Canadian Film	The Decline of the American Empire	Denys Arcand	
Best Canadian Feature Film - Special Jury Citation	Sitting in Limbo	John N. Smith	
Best Canadian Feature Film - Special Jury Citation	Dancing in the Dark	Martha Henry (for acting)	
International Critics' Award	Man Facing Southeast	Eliseo Subiela	

== Programme ==
=== Gala Presentations ===
English title	Original title	Director(s)	Production country
Children of a Lesser God		Randa Haines	United States
The Decline of the American Empire	Le Déclin de l'empire américain	Denys Arcand	Canada
Down by Law		Jim Jarmusch	United States
Kangaroo		Tim Burstall	Australia
Malandro	Ópera do Malandro	Ruy Guerra	Brazil, France
'night, Mother		Tom Moore	United States
Shtei Etzbaot MiTzidon		Eli Cohen	Israel
Round Midnight		Bertrand Tavernier	United States
That's Life		Blake Edwards	United States
Where the River Runs Black		Christopher Cain	United States

=== Canadian Perspective ===
English title	Original title	Director(s)	Production country
21-87		Arthur Lipsett	Canada
The Adventure of Faustus Bidgood		Andy Jones, Michael Jones	Canada
Along the Road to Altamira		David Rimmer	Canada
Anne Trister		Léa Pool	Canada
As Seen on TV		David Rimmer	Canada
The Big Adventure		Colin Strayer	Canada
Birds at Sunrise		Joyce Wieland	Canada
The Climb		Donald Shebib	Canada
Close to Home		Rick Beairsto	Canada
Confidential		Bruce Pittman	Canada
Dancing in the Dark		Leon Marr	Canada
The Dead Father		Guy Maddin	Canada
Divine Solitude		Jean-Marc Larivière	Canada
L'Élue		Louise Lamarre	Canada
Evixion		Bashar Shbib	Canada
The Final Battle		Donald Brittain	Canada
Fluxes		Arthur Lipsett	Canada
La Fuite		Robert Cornellier	Canada
Garbagemen	Les Vidangeurs	Camille Coudari	Canada
Henri		François Labonté	Canada
Her Soil Is Gold		Annette Mangaard	Canada
Intimate Power	Pouvoir intime	Yves Simoneau	Canada
It's a Party!		Peg Campbell	Canada
A Judgement in Stone		Ousama Rawi	Canada, United Kingdom
Knock! Knock!		Bruce McDonald	Canada
Linda Joy		Linda Joy Busby, William D. MacGillivray	Canada
Little Brother Watches Back		Tom Thibault	Canada
Loyalties		Anne Wheeler	Canada
Memory Lapse at the Waterfront		Carol McBride	Canada
Men: A Passion Playground		Atom Egoyan	Canada
N-Zone		Arthur Lipsett	Canada
Nion in the Kabaret de La Vita		Jeremy Podeswa	Canada
O, Dad!		Jonathan Amitay	Canada
?O, Zoo!: The Making of a Fiction Film		Philip Hoffman	Canada
Overnight		Jack Darcus	Canada
Passiflora		Fernand Bélanger, Dagmar Teufal	Canada
Passion and Gasoline		Mark Forler	Canada
Ranch: The Alan Wood Ranch Project		Steven DeNure, Chris Lowry	Canada
Richard Cardinal: Cry from a Diary of a Métis Child		Alanis Obomsawin	Canada
Sitting in Limbo		John N. Smith	Canada
Sonia		Paule Baillargeon	Canada
There Is a Rally		Keith Hlady	Canada
A Trip Down Memory Lane		Arthur Lipsett	Canada
Triptych		Bev Brigham	Canada
Turbo Concerto		Martin Barry	Canada
Up Against the Looking Glass		Bruce Worrall	Canada
Urban Menace		Patricia Rozema	Canada
Very Nice, Very Nice		Arthur Lipsett	Canada
The Wake		Carolyn McLuskie	Canada
Welcome to the Parade		Stuart Clarfield	Canada
White Museum		Mike Hoolboom	Canada

=== Contemporary World Cinema ===
English title	Original title	Director(s)	Production country
40 Square Meters of Germany	40 Quadratmeter Deutschland	Tevfik Başer	West Germany
Abel		Alex van Warmerdam	Netherlands
Almacita, Soul of Desolato	Almacita di desolato	Felix de Rooy	Netherlands
Amorosa		Mai Zetterling	Sweden
Black and White	Noir et Blanc	Claire Devers	France
The Blind Director		Alexander Kluge	West Germany
Beautiful Weather, but Storms in the Afternoon	Beau temps mais orageux en fin de journée	Gérard Frot-Coutaz	France
Blue Velvet		David Lynch	United States
Butterfly and Flowers	Phisuea Lae Dokmai	Euthana Mukdasanit	Thailand
Cactus		Paul Cox	Australia
Caravaggio		Derek Jarman	United Kingdom
Desert of Love	Die Liebeswüste	Lothar Lambert	West Germany
Devil in the Flesh	Il diavolo in corpo	Marco Bellocchio	Italy
Eat the Peach		Peter Ormrod	Ireland
Evening Dress	Tenue de soirée	Bertrand Blier	France
Fatherland		Ken Loach	United Kingdom
Flight North	Flucht in den Norden	Ingemo Engström	West Germany, Finland
Genesis		Mrinal Sen	India
Golden Eighties		Chantal Akerman	Belgium, France, Switzerland
Gonza the Spearman	Yari no gonza	Masahiro Shinoda	Japan
How I Was Systematically Destroyed by an Idiot	Kako sam sistematski uništen od idiota	Slobodan Šijan	Yugoslavia, France
In the Wild Mountains	Ye Shan	Xueshu Yan	China
Infatuation	1/2 Duan qing	Louis Tan	Hong Kong
Jumping	Springen	Jean-Pierre De Decker	Belgium
The Last Emperor	Huo long	Li Han-hsiang	Hong Kong, Taiwan
The Last Rendezvous	Das letze rendezvous	İsmet Elçi	West Germany
The Legend of Suram Fortress		Sergei Parajanov, Dodo Abashidze	Soviet Union (Georgia)
Love Brewed in the African Pot		Kwaw Ansah	Ghana
Max Havelaar		Fons Rademakers	Netherlands
Mulberry	Ppong	Lee Doo-yong	South Korea
My Sweet Little Village	Vesničko má středisková	Jiří Menzel	Czechoslovakia
Nanou		Conny Templeman	France, United Kingdom
Noisy Martha	Nicht nichts ohne Dich	Pia Frankenberg	West Germany
Now or Never	Auf immer und Ewig	Christel Buschmann	West Germany
N'tturudu		Umbañ U Kset	Guinea-Bissau
On Valentine's Day		Ken Harrison	United States
Place of Weeping	Afrika - Land der Hoffnung	Darrell Roodt	South Africa
A Portuguese Goodbye	Um Adeus Português	João Botelho	Portugal
The Ppperformer	De kKKomediant	Casper Verbrugge	Netherlands
Red Kiss	Rouge baiser	Véra Belmont	France
River's Edge		Tim Hunter	United States
Rosa the Rose, Streetwalker	Rosa la rose, fille publique	Paul Vecchiali	France
The Sacrifice	Offret	Andrei Tarkovsky	Sweden, United Kingdom, France
Scene of the Crime	Le lieu du crime	André Téchiné	France
Sexmission	Seksmisja	Juliusz Machulski	Poland
Shadey		Philip Saville	United Kingdom
Shadow of Victory	In de schaduw van de overwinning	Ate de Jong	Netherlands
Sharp Like a Stone	Kerikil-Kerikil Tajam	Sjumandjaja	Indonesia
Shoot for the Sun		Ian Knox	United Kingdom
Sid and Nancy		Alex Cox	United Kingdom
Sleepwalk		Sara Driver	United States
The Smile of the Lamb	Hiuch HaGdi	Shimon Dotan	Israel
Steaming		Joseph Losey	United Kingdom
Summer	Le Rayon vert	Éric Rohmer	France
Super Citizen	超級市民	Wan Jen	Taiwan
Tampopo		Juzo Itami	Japan
Thérèse		Alain Cavalier	France
Time of Silence	Tiempo de Silencio	Vicente Aranda	Spain
The Unknown Soldier	Tuntematon sotilas	Rauni Mollberg	Finland
Welcome in Vienna	Wohin und zurück - Teil 3: Welcome in Vienna	Axel Corti	Austria
What Can I Do with a Male Nude?		Ron Peck	United States
Who Kisses Too Much	Qui trop embrasse	Jacques Davila	France
Wives – Ten Years After	Hustruer – ti år etter	Anja Breien	Norway
The Wolf Girl	Die Wolfsbraut	Dagmar Beiersdorf	West Germany
Working Girls		Lizzie Borden	United States
A Zed & Two Noughts		Peter Greenaway	United Kingdom, Netherlands
Zina		Ken McMullen	United Kingdom

=== Documentaries ===
English title	Original title	Director(s)	Production country
1/2 Man	1/2 Mensch	Gakuryu Ishii	Japan
And the Pursuit of Happiness	La poursuite du bonheur	Louis Malle	United States
Are We Winning, Mommy? America and the Cold War		Barbara Margolis	United States
China: The Arts – The People	China. Die Künste – der Alltag	Ulrike Ottinger	West Germany
Dead End Kids		JoAnne Akalaitis	United States
Father Balweg, Rebel Priest		Tikoy Aguiluz	Philippines
Film Before Film	Was geschah wirklich zwischen den Bildern?	Werner Nekes	West Germany
Forest of Bliss		Robert Gardner	United States
Half Life: A Parable for the Nuclear Age		Dennis O'Rourke	Australia
Hitchcock: The Thrill of Genius	Hitchcock: Il Brivido Del Genio	Francesco Bortolini, Claudio Masenza	Italy
Jimi Plays Monterey		D. A. Pennebaker, Chris Hegedus	United States
Krebs		Bruce Krebs	United States
Lily Tomlin		Nick Broomfield, Joan Churchill	United States
Mix-Up	Mix-Up ou Méli-mélo	Françoise Romand	France
Mother Teresa		Ann Petrie, Jeanette Petrie	United States
My Life for Zarah Leander		Christian Blackwood	United States
Nik and Murray: The Dances of Alwin Nikolais and Murray Louis		Christian Blackwood	United States
Partisans of Vilna		Joshua Waletzky	United States
Routine Pleasures		Jean-Pierre Gorin	United Kingdom, France, West Germany
Sera Posible El Sur		Stefan Paul	West Germany
Sherman's March		Ross McElwee	United States
Shoah		Claude Lanzmann	France
The Thousand and One Daisies	Les mille et une marguerites	Pierre Philippe	France
Tosca's Kiss	Il Bacio di Tosca	Daniel Schmid	Switzerland

=== 20/20 ===
English title	Original title	Director(s)	Production country
Alpine Fire	Höhenfeuer	Fredi M. Murer	Switzerland
El amor brujo		Carlos Saura	Spain
The Assault	De aanslag	Fons Rademakers	Netherlands
Belizaire the Cajun		Glen Pitre	United States
Betty Blue	37°2 le matin	Jean-Jacques Beineix	France
Big Trouble		John Cassavetes	United States
Burke & Wills		Graeme Clifford	Australia
Come and See		Elem Klimov	Soviet Union (Belarus)
Comic Magazine	Komikku zasshi nanka iranai!	Yōjirō Takita	Japan
Defence of the Realm		David Drury	United Kingdom
A Great Wall	北京故事	Peter Wang	United States
I Hate Actors	Je hais les actors	Gérard Krawczyk	France
Jive After Five		Crispin Reece	United Kingdom
Let's Hope It's a Girl	Speriamo che sia femmina	Mario Monicelli	Italy
Malcolm		Nadia Tass	Australia
Men...	Männer...	Doris Dörrie	West Germany
The More Things Change...		Robyn Nevin	Australia
My Life as a Dog	Mitt liv som hund	Lasse Hallström	Sweden
Rosa Luxemburg		Margarethe von Trotta	West Germany
She's Gotta Have It		Spike Lee	United States
Seize the Day		Fielder Cook	United States
Stammheim: The Baader-Meinhof Gang on Trial	Stammheim – Die Baader-Meinhof-Gruppe vor Gericht	Reinhard Hauff	West Germany

=== Latin America: Winds of Change ===
English title	Original title	Director(s)	Production country
Acta General de Chile		Miguel Littín	Chile
The Adventures of Juan Quin Quin	Las aventuras de Juan Quin Quin	Julio García Espinosa	Cuba
...And God Created Them	Díos los Cría...	Jacobo Morales	Puerto Rico
Avaete, Seed of Revenge	Avaeté: Semente da Vingança	Zelito Viana	Brazil
Barren Lives	Vidas secas	Nelson Pereira dos Santos	Brazil
The Battle of Chile	La batalla de Chile: La lucha de un pueblo sin armas	Patricio Guzmán	Chile
Black God, White Devil	Deus e o Diabo na Terra do Sol	Glauber Rocha	Brazil
Blood of the Condor	Sangre de cóndor	Jorge Sanjinés	Bolivia
The Brickmakers	Chiracles	Marta Rodriguez, Jorge Silva	Colombia
Canoa: A Shameful Memory	Canoa: memoria de un hecho vergonzoso	Felipe Cazals	Mexico
Carlos		Mario Handler	Uruguay
The Center Fielder	El center fielder	Ramiro Lacayo-Deshon	Nicaragua
Children of the Cold War	Hijos de la guerra fría	Gonzalo Justiniano	Chile
Chronicle of a Boy Alone	Crónica de un niño solo	Leonardo Favio	Argentina
Chuquiago		Antonio Eguino	Bolivia
The City and the Dogs	La ciudad y los perros	Francisco José Lombardi	Peru
The Conspirators	Os Inconfidentes	Joaquim Pedro de Andrade	Brazil
The Courage of the People	El coraje del pueblo	Jorge Sanjinés	Bolivia
The Days of June	Los dias de junio	Alberto Fischerman	Argentina
Death of a Bureaucrat	La muerte de un burócrata	Tomás Gutiérrez Alea	Cuba
Diamond	Diamante	Gerardo Lara	Mexico
Dona Herlinda and Her Son	Doña Herlinda y su hijo	Jaime Humberto Hermosillo	Mexico
El Salvador: The People Will Win	El Salvador: El pueblo vencerá	Diego de la Texera	El Salvador
Elecciones		Mario Handler	Uruguay
Entranced Earth	Terra em Transe	Glauber Rocha	Brazil
The Fall	A Queda	Ruy Guerra, Nelson Xavier	Brazil
The First Charge of the Machete	La primera carga al machete	Manuel Octavio Gómez	Cuba
Flooded Out	Los inundados	Fernando Birri	Argentina
For the First Time	Por Primera Vez	Octavio Cortazar	Cuba
Frida Still Life	Frida, naturaleza viva	Paul Leduc	Mexico
Gaijin: Roads to Freedom	Gaijin – Caminhos da Liberdade	Tizuka Yamasaki	Brazil
Gamín		Ciro Durán	Colombia
Ganga Zumba		Carlos Diegues	Brazil
The General's Daughter	De todos modos Juan te llamas	Marcela Fernandez Violante	Mexico
Gregorio		Fernando Espinoza	Peru
The Guns	Os Fuzis	Ruy Guerra	Brazil
Hanoi: Tuesday the 13th	Hanoi, Martes 13	Santiago Alvarez	Cuba
The Hour of the Furnaces	La hora de los hornos	Octavio Getino, Fernando Solanas	Argentina
Hour of the Star	A Hora da Estrela	Suzana Amaral	Brazil
The House of Water	La casa de agua	Jacobo Penzo	Venezuela
In the Jungle There Is Much to Do	En la selva hay mucho por hacer	Walter Tournier	Uruguay
An Island for Miguel	Una isla para Miguel	Sara Gómez	Cuba
Jackal of Nahueltoro	El Chacal de Nahueltoro	Miguel Littín	Chile
Julio Begins in July	Julio comienza en julio	Silvio Caiozzi	Chile
LBJ		Santiago Alvarez	Cuba
Little Revenge	Pequeña revancha	Olegario Barrera Monteverde	Venezuela
Love Around the Corner	Amor a la vuelta de la esquina	Alberto Cortés	Mexico
Love Me Forever or Never	Eu sei que vou te amar	Arnaldo Jabor	Brazil
Lucía		Humberto Solás	Cuba
Macario		Roberto Gavaldón	Mexico
Malabrigo		Alberto Durant	Peru
Man Facing Southeast	Hombre mirando al sudeste	Eliseo Subiela	Argentina
A Man of Principle	Cóndores no entierran todos los días	Francisco Norden	Colombia
Mary My Dearest	María de mi corazón	Jaime Humberto Hermosillo	Mexico
Memoirs of Prison	Memórias do Cárcere	Nelson Pereira dos Santos	Brazil
Memories of Underdevelopment	Memorias del Subdesarrollo	Tomás Gutiérrez Alea	Cuba
Mexican Bus Ride	Subida al cielo	Luis Buñuel	Mexico
Miss Mary		María Luisa Bemberg	Argentina
Missing Children	Niños desaparecidos	Estela Bravo	Cuba
The Mothers of Plaza de Mayo	Las Madres de la Plaza de Mayo	Susana Blaustein Muñoz, Lourdes Portillo	Argentina
Murder in the Senate	Asesinato en el senado de la nación	Juan José Jusid	Argentina
Nobody's Wife	Señora de nadie	María Luisa Bemberg	Argentina
Now		Santiago Alvarez	Cuba
One Way or Another	De Cierta Manera	Sara Gómez	Cuba
An Ordinary Day	Nicolás y los demás	Jacobo Morales	Puerto Rico
The Other Francisco	El otro Francisco	Sergio Giral	Cuba
Parting of the Ways	Lejania	Jesús Díaz	Cuba
The Party Is Over	Fin de fiesta	Leopoldo Torre Nilsson	Argentina
Patakin Means Fable	¡Patakín! quiere decir ¡fábula!	Manuel Octavio Gómez	Cuba
Pedro Páramo		Carlos Velo	Mexico
A Photograph Goes Around the World	Una foto recorre el mundo	Pedro Chaskel	Cuba
Poor Butterfly	Pobre mariposa	Raúl de la Torre	Argentina
Portrait of Teresa	Retrato de Teresa	Pastor Vega	Cuba
The Promised Land	La tierra prometida	Miguel Littín	Chile
Rebellion in Patagonia	La Patagonia rebelde	Héctor Olivera	Argentina
Reed: Insurgent Mexico	Reed, México insurgente	Paul Leduc	Mexico
Revolution	Revolución	Jorge Sanjinés	Bolivia
Rio, 100 Degrees F.	Rio, 40 Graus	Nelson Pereira dos Santos	Brazil
S. Bernardo	São Bernardo	Leon Hirszman	Brazil
The Smoking Fish	El Pez que Fuma	Román Chalbaud	Venezuela
Story of a Battle	Historia de una batalla	Manuel Octavio Gómez	Cuba
Tangos, the Exile of Gardel	Tangos, el exilio de Gardel	Fernando Solanas	Argentina, France
Those Will Pass	Estós Si Pasarán	Rossana Lacayo	Nicaragua
Three Times Ana	Tres veces Ana	David José Kohon	Argentina
Time for Revenge	Tiempo de revancha	Adolfo Aristarain	Argentina
Time of the Wolves	Tiempo de lobos	Alberto Isaac	Mexico
Time to Die	Tiempo de morir	Jorge Alí Triana	Colombia
Toss Me a Dime	Tire dié	Fernando Birri	Argentina
The Traitors	Los Traidores	Raymundo Gleyzer	Argentina
The Twelve Chairs	Las doce sillas	Tomás Gutiérrez Alea	Cuba
We Will Never Surrender	Nunca nos rendiremos	Fernando Somarriba	Nicaragua
The Wedding	La Boda	Thaelman Urguelles	Venezuela

=== Open Vault ===
English title	Original title	Director(s)	Production country
Bullfighter and the Lady		Budd Boetticher	United States
The Desert Song		Robert Florey	United States
Doctor X		Michael Curtiz	United States
For the Term of His Natural Life		Norman Dawn	Australia
Lost Horizon		Frank Capra	United States
Mystery of the Wax Museum		Michael Curtiz	United States
Oedipus Rex		Tyrone Guthrie	Canada
Paid		Sam Wood	United States
Sunrise: A Song of Two Humans		F. W. Murnau	United States
You'll Never Get Rich		Sidney Lanfield	United States

=== Close Encounters ===
A new program introduced this year, which featured talks by filmmakers about their work.

- Richard Edlund
- Gabriel Figueroa
- Milos Forman
- John Schlesinger
