= 8th Genie Awards =

1987 Canadian film awards

- Date: March 18, 1987
- Site: Metro Toronto Convention Centre; Toronto, Ontario
- Hosted by: Helen Shaver; Linda Sorensen; Jean LeClerc

Highlights
- Best Picture: The Decline of the American Empire (Le Déclin de l'empire américain)
- Most awards: The Decline of the American Empire
- Most nominations: The Decline of the American Empire

Television coverage
- Network: CBC Television

The 8th Annual Genie Awards were held on March 18, 1987, to honour Canadian films made the previous year. The show was again held at the Metro Toronto Convention Centre and was co-hosted by actors Helen Shaver, Linda Sorensen and Jean LeClerc. It was broadcast live on CBC Television.

The prestigious Air Canada Award was presented to Garth Drabinsky, film producer and head of North America's largest movie exhibition chain, Cineplex Odeon.

The Special Achievement award went to Taming of the Demons, a film commissioned by Teleglobe Canada for Expo 86 by experimental filmmaker Emil Radok which explores the development of civilization through communications technologies.

The show itself received mixed reviews but the Canadian film industry had finally received the break it had long been waiting for in Denys Arcand's The Decline of the American Empire (Le Déclin de l'empire américain), an international hit which, a few months earlier, had won the International Critics' Prize at the Cannes Film Festival and become the first Canadian film to be nominated for the Academy Award for Best International Feature Film. To no one's surprise, it dominated the awards.

== Controversy ==
Danielle Messia's song "De la main gauche", from the film Anne Trister, was named winner of the award for Best Original Song at the ceremony, but later had its award rescinded when it was discovered that the song was not original to the film, but in fact had previously appeared on one of Messia's own albums five years earlier. Gilles Vigneault's "Les iles de l'enfance", from the film Equinox (Équinoxe), was later named the new winner of the award.

== Winners and nominees ==
Motion Picture	Direction
The Decline of the American Empire (Le Déclin de l'empire américain) — Roger Frappier and René Malo; Dancing in the Dark — Anthony Kramreither; Intimate Power (Pouvoir intime) — Claude Bonin; John and the Missus — John Hunter and Peter O'Brian; Loyalties — Ronald Lillie and William Johnston	Denys Arcand, The Decline of the American Empire (Le Déclin de l'empire américain); Leon Marr, Dancing in the Dark; Yves Simoneau, Intimate Power (Pouvoir intime); John N. Smith, Sitting in Limbo; Anne Wheeler, Loyalties
Actor in a leading role	Actress in a leading role
Gordon Pinsent, John and the Missus; Pierre Curzi, The Decline of the American Empire (Le Déclin de l'empire américain); Rémy Girard, The Decline of the American Empire (Le Déclin de l'empire américain); Winston Rekert, The Blue Man; Kenneth Welsh, Loyalties	Martha Henry, Dancing in the Dark; Dorothée Berryman, The Decline of the American Empire (Le Déclin de l'empire américain); Jackie Burroughs, John and the Missus; Tantoo Cardinal, Loyalties; Helen Shaver, Lost!; Marie Tifo, Intimate Power (Pouvoir intime)
Actor in a supporting role	Actress in a supporting role
Gabriel Arcand, The Decline of the American Empire (Le Déclin de l'empire américain); Robert Gravel, Intimate Power (Pouvoir intime); Roland Hewgill, John and the Missus; Tom Jackson, Loyalties; Yves Jacques, The Decline of the American Empire (Le Déclin de l'empire américain)	Louise Portal, The Decline of the American Empire (Le Déclin de l'empire américain); Lucie Laurier, Anne Trister; Andrée Pelletier, Bach and Broccoli (Bach et Bottine); Geneviève Rioux, The Decline of the American Empire (Le Déclin de l'empire américain); Marie Tifo, In the Shadow of the Wind (Les Fous de bassan)
Original Screenplay	Adapted Screenplay
Denys Arcand, The Decline of the American Empire (Le Déclin de l'empire américain); Michael Jones and Andy Jones, The Adventure of Faustus Bidgood; Richard Nichol, Sitting in Limbo; Sharon Riis, Loyalties; Yves Simoneau and Pierre Curzi, Intimate Power (Pouvoir intime)	Leon Marr, Dancing in the Dark; Gordon Pinsent, John and the Missus; Peter Rowe, Lost!
Best Live Action Short Drama	Best Animated Short
I Need a Man Like You to Make My Dreams Come True — Daria Stermac, Kalli Paakspuu; It's a Party! — Peg Campbell; Nion in the Kabaret de La Vita — Jeremy Podeswa; Transit — Jean-Roch Marcotte; Where's Pete — Michael Scott	Get a Job — Brad Caslor, Michael Scott and Derek Mazur; Every Dog's Guide to Complete Home Safety — Bill Pettigrew, Les Drew; Tables of Content — Wendy Tilby
Art Direction/Production Design	Cinematography
Lillian Sarafinchan, Dancing in the Dark; Michel Proulx, In the Shadow of the Wind (Les Fous de bassan); Michel Proulx, Intimate Power (Pouvoir intime); François Séguin, Exit	Pierre Mignot, Anne Trister; Alain Dostie, In the Shadow of the Wind (Les Fous de bassan); Guy Dufaux, Equinox (Équinoxe); Pierre Mignot, Exit; René Verzier, The Morning Man (Un matin, une vie); René Verzier, Toby McTeague
Costume Design	Editing
Wendy Partridge, Loyalties; Michèle Hamel, Exit; Louise Jobin, Intimate Power (Pouvoir intime); Nicole Pelletier, In the Shadow of the Wind (Les Fous de bassan)	Monique Fortier, The Decline of the American Empire (Le Déclin de l'empire américain); André Corriveau, Intimate Power (Pouvoir intime); Michael Jones, The Adventure of Faustus Bidgood
Overall Sound	Sound Editing
Adrian Croll, Jean-Pierre Joutel and Richard Besse, The Decline of the American Empire (Le Déclin de l'empire américain); Peter Clements, David Appleby and Don White, Abducted; Michael O'Farrell, Gordon Thompson, Don White and David Appleby, The Pink Chiquitas; Hans Oomes, Richard Nichol, Shelley Craig and Jean-Pierre Joutel, Sitting in Limbo	Paul Dion, Diane Boucher and Andy Malcolm, The Decline of the American Empire (Le Déclin de l'empire américain); Sharon Lackie, Peter McBurnie and Peter Thilaye, Loyalties; Peter McBurnie, Alison Grace, Sharon Lackie, Michael O'Farrell and Alison Clark, The Pink Chiquitas; Andy Malcolm, Paul Dion and Jules Le Noir, Intimate Power (Pouvoir intime)
Achievement in Music: Original Score	Achievement in Music: Original Song
Michael Conway Baker, John and the Missus; Marvin Dolgay, The Blue Man; Richard Grégoire and Marie Bernard, Exit	Gilles Vigneault, "Les iles de l'enfance" — Equinox (Équinoxe); Robert Joy and Andy Jones, "Show Goin' On" — The Adventure of Faustus Bidgood; Danielle Messia, "De la main gauche" — Anne Trister; Peter Pringle and Kevin Hunter, "Cold As Ice" — Toby McTeague; Peter R. Simpson and Paul Zaza, "Out of the Fire" — Bullies; Gilles Vigneault, "Les iles de l'enfance" — Equinox (Équinoxe)
Documentary	Special Awards
Dads and Kids — Christian Bruyère; Dream Tracks (Les Traces du rêve) — Jacques Vallée; ?O, Zoo!: The Making of a Fiction Film — Philip Hoffman; Ranch: The Alan Wood Ranch Project — Steven DeNure and Chris Lowry; Return to Departure: The Biography of a Painting — Kirk Tougas	Golden Reel Award: The Decline of the American Empire (Le Déclin de l'empire américain); Special Achievement: Emil Radok, Paul Kravicky; Outstanding Contribution: Garth Drabinsky
