= Canadian Screen Award for Best Cinematography =

Canadian film award

- Country: Canada
- Presented by: Academy of Canadian Cinema & Television
- First award: 1963
- Currently held by: Jeremy Benning for 40 Acres (2025)
- Website: academy.ca/awards

The Academy of Canadian Cinema and Television presents an annual award for Best Achievement in Cinematography, to honour the best Canadian film cinematography.

The award was first presented in 1963 as part of the Canadian Film Awards, with separate categories for colour and black-and-white cinematography; the separate categories were discontinued after 1969, with only a single category presented through the 1970s. After 1978, the award was presented as part of the new Genie Awards; since 2012, it has been presented as part of the Canadian Screen Awards. In early years, the award could be presented for either narrative feature or documentary films, although this was discontinued later on and only feature films were eligible. Beginning with the 3rd Canadian Screen Awards, a separate category was introduced for Best Cinematography in a Documentary.

== 1960s ==
Year	Nominee	Film	Ref
1963; 15th Canadian Film Awards
1963; 15th Canadian Film Awards	Donald Wilder	Nahanni	
1963; 15th Canadian Film Awards	Guy Borremans	Day After Day (Jour après jour)	
1964; 16th Canadian Film Awards
1964; 16th Canadian Film Awards	Stan Brede	Brampton Builds a Car	
1964; 16th Canadian Film Awards	John Spotton	The Hutterites	
1965; 17th Canadian Film Awards
1965; 17th Canadian Film Awards	Francis Chapman, Christopher Chapman	Expedition Bluenose	
1965; 17th Canadian Film Awards	Jean-Claude Labrecque	Walls of Memory (Mémoire en fête)	
1966; 18th Canadian Film Awards
1966; 18th Canadian Film Awards	Jean-Claude Labrecque	60 Cycles	
1966; 18th Canadian Film Awards	Georges Dufaux	Mission of Fear (Astataïon, ou Le Festin des morts)	
1967; 19th Canadian Film Awards
1967; 19th Canadian Film Awards	Gilles Gascon	Element 3 (Élément 3)	
1967; 19th Canadian Film Awards	Grahame Woods	Wojeck: "The Last Man in the World"	
1968; 20th Canadian Film Awards
1968; 20th Canadian Film Awards	Georges Dufaux	Isabel	
1968; 20th Canadian Film Awards	Bernard Gosselin	The Times That Are (Le Règne du jour)	
1969; 21st Canadian Film Awards
1969; 21st Canadian Film Awards	Réo Grégoire	No Matter Where (Là ou ailleurs)	
1969; 21st Canadian Film Awards	Tony Ianzelo	The Best Damn Fiddler from Calabogie to Kaladar	

== 1970s ==
Year	Nominee	Film	Ref
1970; 22nd Canadian Film Awards
1970; 22nd Canadian Film Awards	Bernard Chentrier	Red	
1971; 23rd Canadian Film Awards
1971; 23rd Canadian Film Awards	Michel Brault	Mon oncle Antoine	
1972; 24th Canadian Film Awards
1972; 24th Canadian Film Awards	Michel Brault	The Time of the Hunt (Le Temps d'une chasse)	
1973; 25th Canadian Film Awards
1973; 25th Canadian Film Awards	Donald Wilder	Paperback Hero	
1974
1974	No award presented		
1975; 26th Canadian Film Awards
1975; 26th Canadian Film Awards	Paul Van der Linden	Eliza's Horoscope	
1976; 27th Canadian Film Awards
1976; 27th Canadian Film Awards	Richard Leiterman	The Far Shore	
1977; 28th Canadian Film Awards
1977; 28th Canadian Film Awards	Pierre Mignot	J.A. Martin Photographer (J.A. Martin photographe)	
1978; 29th Canadian Film Awards
1978; 29th Canadian Film Awards	Miklós Lente	In Praise of Older Women	
1978; 29th Canadian Film Awards	Marc Champion	I, Maureen	
1978; 29th Canadian Film Awards	Mark Irwin	Blood and Guts	

== 1980s ==
Year	Nominee	Film	Ref
1980; 1st Genie Awards
1980; 1st Genie Awards	John Coquillon	The Changeling	
1980; 1st Genie Awards	Laszlo George	Running	
1980; 1st Genie Awards	Miklós Lente	Agency	
1980; 1st Genie Awards	Pierre Mignot	Cordélia	
1980; 1st Genie Awards	Reginald H. Morris	Murder by Decree	
1981; 2nd Genie Awards
1981; 2nd Genie Awards	Michel Brault	Good Riddance (Les bons débarras)	
1981; 2nd Genie Awards	Richard Ciupka	Atlantic City, U.S.A.	
1981; 2nd Genie Awards	Miklós Lente	Suzanne	
1981; 2nd Genie Awards	Reginald H. Morris	Phobia	
1981; 2nd Genie Awards	François Protat	Fantastica	
1982; 3rd Genie Awards
1982; 3rd Genie Awards	Richard Leiterman	Silence of the North	
1982; 3rd Genie Awards	John F. Phillips	Alligator Shoes	
1982; 3rd Genie Awards	Vic Sarin	Heartaches	
1983; 4th Genie Awards
1983; 4th Genie Awards	Michel Brault	Threshold	
1983; 4th Genie Awards	Pierre Mignot	A Day in a Taxi (Une journée en taxi)	
1984; 5th Genie Awards
1984; 5th Genie Awards	Pierre Mignot	Maria Chapdelaine	
1984; 5th Genie Awards	Richard Ciupka	The Terry Fox Story	
1984; 5th Genie Awards	Mark Irwin	Videodrome	
1984; 5th Genie Awards	Doug McKay	Dead Wrong	
1984; 5th Genie Awards	Reginald H. Morris	A Christmas Story	
1985; 6th Genie Awards
1985; 6th Genie Awards	Pierre Mignot	Mario	
1985; 6th Genie Awards	John Clement	Thrillkill	
1985; 6th Genie Awards	Laszlo George	Draw!	
1985; 6th Genie Awards	Ed Higginson	Isaac Littlefeathers	
1985; 6th Genie Awards	Douglas Kiefer	Unfinished Business	
1985; 6th Genie Awards	François Protat	The Crime of Ovide Plouffe (Le Crime d'Ovide Plouffe)	
1986; 7th Genie Awards
1986; 7th Genie Awards	François Protat	Joshua Then and Now	
1986; 7th Genie Awards	Marc Champion	Samuel Lount	
1986; 7th Genie Awards	Frank Tidy	One Magic Christmas	
1987; 8th Genie Awards
1987; 8th Genie Awards	Pierre Mignot	Anne Trister	
1987; 8th Genie Awards	Alain Dostie	In the Shadow of the Wind (Les Fous de Bassan)	
1987; 8th Genie Awards	Guy Dufaux	Equinox (Équinoxe)	
1987; 8th Genie Awards	Pierre Mignot	Exit	
1987; 8th Genie Awards	René Verzier	The Morning Man (Un matin, une vie)	
1987; 8th Genie Awards	René Verzier	Toby McTeague	
1988; 9th Genie Awards
1988; 9th Genie Awards	Guy Dufaux	Night Zoo (Un zoo la nuit)	
1988; 9th Genie Awards	Michel Brault	The Great Land of Small (C'est pas parce qu'on est petit qu'on peut pas être grand!)	
1988; 9th Genie Awards	Douglas Koch	I've Heard the Mermaids Singing	
1988; 9th Genie Awards	Richard Leiterman	The Climb	
1989; 10th Genie Awards
1989; 10th Genie Awards	Peter Suschitzky	Dead Ringers	
1989; 10th Genie Awards	Thomas Burstyn	The Tadpole and the Whale (La Grenouille et la baleine)	
1989; 10th Genie Awards	Karol Ike	Malarek	
1989; 10th Genie Awards	Pierre Mignot	Straight for the Heart (À corps perdu)	
1989; 10th Genie Awards	René Ohashi	Shadow Dancing	
1989; 10th Genie Awards	Thomas Vámos	The Revolving Doors (Les Portes tournantes)	

== 1990s ==
Year	Nominee	Film	Ref
1990; 11th Genie Awards
1990; 11th Genie Awards	Guy Dufaux	Jesus of Montreal (Jésus de Montréal)	
1990; 11th Genie Awards	Richard Leiterman	The First Season	
1990; 11th Genie Awards	Pierre Mignot	Cruising Bar	
1990; 11th Genie Awards	René Ohashi	Millennium	
1991; 12th Genie Awards
1991; 12th Genie Awards	Peter James	Black Robe	
1991; 12th Genie Awards	Raoul Coutard, Mike Molloy	Bethune: The Making of a Hero	
1991; 12th Genie Awards	Guy Dufaux	Moody Beach	
1991; 12th Genie Awards	Guy Dufaux	Nelligan	
1991; 12th Genie Awards	Daniel Jobin	Cargo	
1992; 13th Genie Awards
1992; 13th Genie Awards	Peter Suschitzky	Naked Lunch	
1992; 13th Genie Awards	Michel Caron	The Saracen Woman (La Sarrasine)	
1992; 13th Genie Awards	Guy Dufaux	Léolo	
1992; 13th Genie Awards	Pierre Mignot	Phantom Life (La Vie fantôme)	
1992; 13th Genie Awards	Thomas Vámos	Being at Home with Claude	
1993; 14th Genie Awards
1993; 14th Genie Awards	Alain Dostie	Thirty Two Short Films About Glenn Gould	
1993; 14th Genie Awards	Thomas Burstyn	The Lotus Eaters	
1993; 14th Genie Awards	Philip Linzey	Harmony Cats	
1993; 14th Genie Awards	Barry Stone	Paris, France	
1993; 14th Genie Awards	Billy Williams	Shadow of the Wolf	
1994; 15th Genie Awards
1994; 15th Genie Awards	Paul Sarossy	Exotica	
1994; 15th Genie Awards	Sylvain Brault	My Friend Max (Mon amie Max)	
1994; 15th Genie Awards	François Protat	Kabloonak	
1994; 15th Genie Awards	Paul Van der Linden	Henry & Verlin	
1994; 15th Genie Awards	Peter Wunstorf	Double Happiness	
1995; 16th Genie Awards
1995; 16th Genie Awards	Thomas Burstyn	Magic in the Water	
1995; 16th Genie Awards	Alain Dostie	The Confessional (Le Confessionnal)	
1995; 16th Genie Awards	Pierre Gill	Black List (Liste noire)	
1995; 16th Genie Awards	Vic Sarin	Margaret's Museum	
1995; 16th Genie Awards	Barry Stone	Rude	
1996; 17th Genie Awards
1996; 17th Genie Awards	Peter Suschitzky	Crash	
1996; 17th Genie Awards	Sylvain Brault	Rowing Through	
1996; 17th Genie Awards	Éric Cayla	A Cry in the Night (Le Cri de la nuit)	
1996; 17th Genie Awards	Guy Dufaux	Polygraph (Le Polygraphe)	
1996; 17th Genie Awards	Daniel Jobin	Lilies	
1997; 18th Genie Awards
1997; 18th Genie Awards	Paul Sarossy	The Sweet Hereafter	
1997; 18th Genie Awards	Éric Cayla	Karmina	
1997; 18th Genie Awards	Serge Ladouceur	Night of the Flood (La nuit du déluge)	
1997; 18th Genie Awards	Gregory Middleton	Kissed	
1997; 18th Genie Awards	André Turpin	Cosmos	
1998; 19th Genie Awards
1998; 19th Genie Awards	Alain Dostie	The Red Violin	
1998; 19th Genie Awards	Jan Kiesser	Such a Long Journey	
1998; 19th Genie Awards	Douglas Koch	Last Night	
1998; 19th Genie Awards	Glen MacPherson	Regeneration	
1998; 19th Genie Awards	Gregory Middleton	The Falling	
1999; 20th Genie Awards
1999; 20th Genie Awards	Paul Sarossy	Felicia's Journey	
1999; 20th Genie Awards	Pierre Gill	Memories Unlocked (Souvenirs intimes)	
1999; 20th Genie Awards	Alwyn Kumst	The Divine Ryans	
1999; 20th Genie Awards	Gregory Middleton	The Five Senses	
1999; 20th Genie Awards	Pierre Mignot	Alegría	

== 2000s ==
Year	Nominee	Film	Ref
2000; 21st Genie Awards
2000; 21st Genie Awards	André Turpin	Maelström	
2000; 21st Genie Awards	Guy Dufaux	Stardom	
2000; 21st Genie Awards	Jonathan Freeman	Possible Worlds	
2000; 21st Genie Awards	Pierre Gill	The Art of War	
2000; 21st Genie Awards	Jean Lépine	To Walk with Lions	
2001; 22nd Genie Awards
2001; 22nd Genie Awards	Pierre Gill	Lost and Delirious	
2001; 22nd Genie Awards	Thom Best	Ginger Snaps	
2001; 22nd Genie Awards	Sebastian Edschmid	Deeply	
2001; 22nd Genie Awards	David Greene	Century Hotel	
2001; 22nd Genie Awards	André Turpin	Soft Shell Man (Un crabe dans la tête)	
2002; 23rd Genie Awards
2002; 23rd Genie Awards	Paul Sarossy	Perfect Pie	
2002; 23rd Genie Awards	Jan Kiesser	Rare Birds	
2002; 23rd Genie Awards	Serge Ladouceur	Savage Messiah (Moïse, l'affaire Roch Thériault)	
2002; 23rd Genie Awards	Larry Lynn	Inside (Histoire de pen)	
2002; 23rd Genie Awards	Gregory Middleton	Between Strangers	
2003; 24th Genie Awards
2003; 24th Genie Awards	Allen Smith	Seducing Doctor Lewis (La Grande séduction)	
2003; 24th Genie Awards	François Dutil	Saved by the Belles	
2003; 24th Genie Awards	Stefan Ivanov	A Problem with Fear	
2003; 24th Genie Awards	Gregory Middleton	Falling Angels	
2003; 24th Genie Awards	Jean-Pierre St. Louis	Gaz Bar Blues	
2004; 25th Genie Awards
2004; 25th Genie Awards	Paul Sarossy	Head in the Clouds	
2004; 25th Genie Awards	Bernard Couture	The Last Tunnel (Le Dernier Tunnel)	
2004; 25th Genie Awards	Louis de Ernsted	Battle of the Brave (Nouvelle-France)	
2004; 25th Genie Awards	Pierre Mignot	Bittersweet Memories (Ma vie en cinémascope)	
2004; 25th Genie Awards	André Turpin	Childstar	
2005; 26th Genie Awards
2005; 26th Genie Awards	Giles Nuttgens	Water	
2005; 26th Genie Awards	Balazs Bolygo	It's All Gone Pete Tong	
2005; 26th Genie Awards	Bernard Couture	The Outlander (Le Survenant)	
2005; 26th Genie Awards	Pierre Mignot	C.R.A.Z.Y.	
2005; 26th Genie Awards	André Turpin	Familia	
2006; 27th Genie Awards
2006; 27th Genie Awards	Pierre Gill	The Rocket (Maurice Richard)	
2006; 27th Genie Awards	Bruce Chun	Bon Cop, Bad Cop	
2006; 27th Genie Awards	Steve Cosens	Snow Cake	
2006; 27th Genie Awards	Jan Kiesser	Beowulf and Grendel	
2006; 27th Genie Awards	Nicola Pecorini	Tideland	
2007; 28th Genie Awards
2007; 28th Genie Awards	Peter Suschitzky	Eastern Promises	
2007; 28th Genie Awards	Miroslaw Baszak	Shake Hands With the Devil	
2007; 28th Genie Awards	Bruce Chun	Nitro	
2007; 28th Genie Awards	Alain Dostie	Silk	
2007; 28th Genie Awards	Vic Sarin	Partition	
2008; 29th Genie Awards
2008; 29th Genie Awards	Gregory Middleton	Fugitive Pieces	
2008; 29th Genie Awards	Nicolas Bolduc	Le Banquet	
2008; 29th Genie Awards	Bobby Bukowski	The Stone Angel	
2008; 29th Genie Awards	Pierre Gill	The American Trap (Le Piège américain)	
2008; 29th Genie Awards	Sara Mishara	Everything Is Fine (Tout est parfait)	
2009; 30th Genie Awards
2009; 30th Genie Awards	Pierre Gill	Polytechnique	
2009; 30th Genie Awards	Steve Cosens	Nurse.Fighter.Boy	
2009; 30th Genie Awards	Jonathan Freeman	Fifty Dead Men Walking	
2009; 30th Genie Awards	Ronald Plante	The Master Key (Grande Ourse: La Clé des possibles)	
2009; 30th Genie Awards	Allen Smith	Sticky Fingers (Les doigts croches)	

== 2010s ==
Year	Nominee	Film	Ref
2010; 31st Genie Awards
2010; 31st Genie Awards	André Turpin	Incendies	
2010; 31st Genie Awards	Bernard Couture	10½	
2010; 31st Genie Awards	Ronald Plante	Piché: The Landing of a Man (Piché: entre ciel et terre)	
2010; 31st Genie Awards	Claudine Sauvé	The Wild Hunt	
2010; 31st Genie Awards	Stéphanie Weber Biron	Heartbeats (Les Amours imaginaires)	
2011; 32nd Genie Awards
2011; 32nd Genie Awards	Jean-François Lord	Snow & Ashes	
2011; 32nd Genie Awards	Miroslaw Baszak	The Bang Bang Club	
2011; 32nd Genie Awards	Pierre Cottereau	Café de Flore	
2011; 32nd Genie Awards	Jon Joffin	Daydream Nation	
2011; 32nd Genie Awards	Ronald Plante	Monsieur Lazhar	
2012; 1st Canadian Screen Awards
2012; 1st Canadian Screen Awards	Nicolas Bolduc	War Witch (Rebelle)	
2012; 1st Canadian Screen Awards	Philippe Lavalette	Inch'Allah	
2012; 1st Canadian Screen Awards	Giles Nuttgens	Midnight's Children	
2012; 1st Canadian Screen Awards	Bobby Shore	Goon	
2012; 1st Canadian Screen Awards	Brendan Steacy	Still Mine	
2013; 2nd Canadian Screen Awards
2013; 2nd Canadian Screen Awards	Nicolas Bolduc	Enemy	
2013; 2nd Canadian Screen Awards	François Delisle	The Meteor (Le Météore)	
2013; 2nd Canadian Screen Awards	Pierre Gill	Upside Down	
2013; 2nd Canadian Screen Awards	Antonio Riestra	Mama	
2013; 2nd Canadian Screen Awards	Allen Smith	Maïna	
2014; 3rd Canadian Screen Awards
2014; 3rd Canadian Screen Awards	André Turpin	Mommy	
2014; 3rd Canadian Screen Awards	Norayr Kasper	Fall	
2014; 3rd Canadian Screen Awards	Michel La Veaux	Meetings with a Young Poet	
2014; 3rd Canadian Screen Awards	Mathieu Laverdière	Henri Henri	
2014; 3rd Canadian Screen Awards	Luc Montpellier	It Was You Charlie	
2015; 4th Canadian Screen Awards
2015; 4th Canadian Screen Awards	Yves Bélanger	Brooklyn	
2015; 4th Canadian Screen Awards	Danny Cohen	Room	
2015; 4th Canadian Screen Awards	Karim Hussain	Hyena Road	
2015; 4th Canadian Screen Awards	Sara Mishara	Felix and Meira (Félix et Meira)	
2015; 4th Canadian Screen Awards	Rene Ohashi	Forsaken	
2016; 5th Canadian Screen Awards
2016; 5th Canadian Screen Awards	André Turpin	It's Only the End of the World (Juste la fin du monde)	
2016; 5th Canadian Screen Awards	Glauco Bermudez	Before the Streets (Avant les rues)	
2016; 5th Canadian Screen Awards	Josée Deshaies	Nelly	
2016; 5th Canadian Screen Awards	Leung Ming Kai	Old Stone	
2016; 5th Canadian Screen Awards	Scott Moore	Werewolf	
2017; 6th Canadian Screen Awards
2017; 6th Canadian Screen Awards	Nicolas Bolduc	Hochelaga, Land of Souls (Hochelaga terre des âmes)	
2017; 6th Canadian Screen Awards	Nicolas Canniccioni	The Little Girl Who Was Too Fond of Matches (La petite fille qui aimait trop les allumettes)	
2017; 6th Canadian Screen Awards	Sina Kermanizadeh	Ava	
2017; 6th Canadian Screen Awards	Mathieu Laverdière	We Are the Others (Nous sommes les autres)	
2017; 6th Canadian Screen Awards	Norm Li	Never Steady, Never Still	
2018; 7th Canadian Screen Awards
2018; 7th Canadian Screen Awards	Sara Mishara	The Great Darkened Days (La grande noirceur)	
2018; 7th Canadian Screen Awards	Daniel Grant	Octavio Is Dead!	
2018; 7th Canadian Screen Awards	Ian Lagarde	For Those Who Don't Read Me (À tous ceux qui ne me lisent pas)	
2018; 7th Canadian Screen Awards	Sara Mishara	Allure	
2018; 7th Canadian Screen Awards	Paul Sarossy	The Padre	
2019; 8th Canadian Screen Awards
2019; 8th Canadian Screen Awards	Norm Li	The Body Remembers When the World Broke Open	
2019; 8th Canadian Screen Awards	Josée Deshaies	A Brother's Love (La femme de mon frère)	
2019; 8th Canadian Screen Awards	Catherine Lutes	Disappearance at Clifton Hill	
2019; 8th Canadian Screen Awards	Gregory Middleton	American Woman	
2019; 8th Canadian Screen Awards	Brendan Steacy	Lucky Day	

== 2020s ==
Year	Nominee	Film	Ref
2020; 9th Canadian Screen Awards
2020; 9th Canadian Screen Awards	Maya Bankovic	Akilla's Escape	
2020; 9th Canadian Screen Awards	Marie Davignon	Beans	
2020; 9th Canadian Screen Awards	James Klopko	A Fire in the Cold Season	
2020; 9th Canadian Screen Awards	Michel St-Martin	Blood Quantum	
2020; 9th Canadian Screen Awards	Stéphanie Weber Biron	Nadia, Butterfly	
2021; 10th Canadian Screen Awards
2021; 10th Canadian Screen Awards	Sara Mishara	Drunken Birds (Les Oiseaux ivres)	
2021; 10th Canadian Screen Awards	Pierre Gill	You Will Remember Me (Tu te souviendras de moi)	
2021; 10th Canadian Screen Awards	Tess Girard	Drifting Snow	
2021; 10th Canadian Screen Awards	Daniel Grant	All My Puny Sorrows	
2021; 10th Canadian Screen Awards	Rich Williamson	Scarborough	
2022; 11th Canadian Screen Awards
2022; 11th Canadian Screen Awards	Sara Mishara	Viking	
2022; 11th Canadian Screen Awards	Vincent Gonneville	Nouveau Québec	
2022; 11th Canadian Screen Awards	Douglas Koch	Crimes of the Future	
2022; 11th Canadian Screen Awards	Christopher Lew	Riceboy Sleeps	
2022; 11th Canadian Screen Awards	Keenan Lynch	Tehranto	
2023; 12th Canadian Screen Awards
2023; 12th Canadian Screen Awards	Jared Raab	BlackBerry	
2023; 12th Canadian Screen Awards	Gabriel Brault-Tardif	Richelieu	
2023; 12th Canadian Screen Awards	Alexandre Bussière	Montreal Girls	
2023; 12th Canadian Screen Awards	Karim Hussain	Infinity Pool	
2023; 12th Canadian Screen Awards	Mathieu Laverdière	Solo	
2023; 12th Canadian Screen Awards	Jean-François Lord	Ru	
2023; 12th Canadian Screen Awards	Mike McLaughlin	Hands That Bind	
2023; 12th Canadian Screen Awards	André Turpin	The Nature of Love (Simple comme Sylvain)	
2024; 13th Canadian Screen Awards
2024; 13th Canadian Screen Awards	Gayle Ye	Paying for It	
2024; 13th Canadian Screen Awards	Maya Bankovic	The Invisibles	
2024; 13th Canadian Screen Awards	Vincent Gonneville	Shepherds (Bergers)	
2024; 13th Canadian Screen Awards	Nick Haight	Young Werther	
2024; 13th Canadian Screen Awards	Catherine Lutes	Close to You	
2025; 14th Canadian Screen Awards
2025; 14th Canadian Screen Awards	Jeremy Benning	40 Acres	
2025; 14th Canadian Screen Awards	Andrew Appelle	Deathstalker	
2025; 14th Canadian Screen Awards	Edith Labbé	1+1+1 Life, Love, Chaos (1+1+1 La vie, l'amour, le chaos)	
2025; 14th Canadian Screen Awards	Catherine Lutes	There, There	
2025; 14th Canadian Screen Awards	Nikolay Michaylov	Measures for a Funeral	
2025; 14th Canadian Screen Awards	Ronald Plante	Yunan	
2025; 14th Canadian Screen Awards	Jared Raab	Nirvanna the Band the Show the Movie	
2025; 14th Canadian Screen Awards	J Stevens	Really Happy Someday	

== See also ==
- Prix Iris for Best Cinematography
