= Richard Grégoire =

Canadian film and television composer (1944–2025)

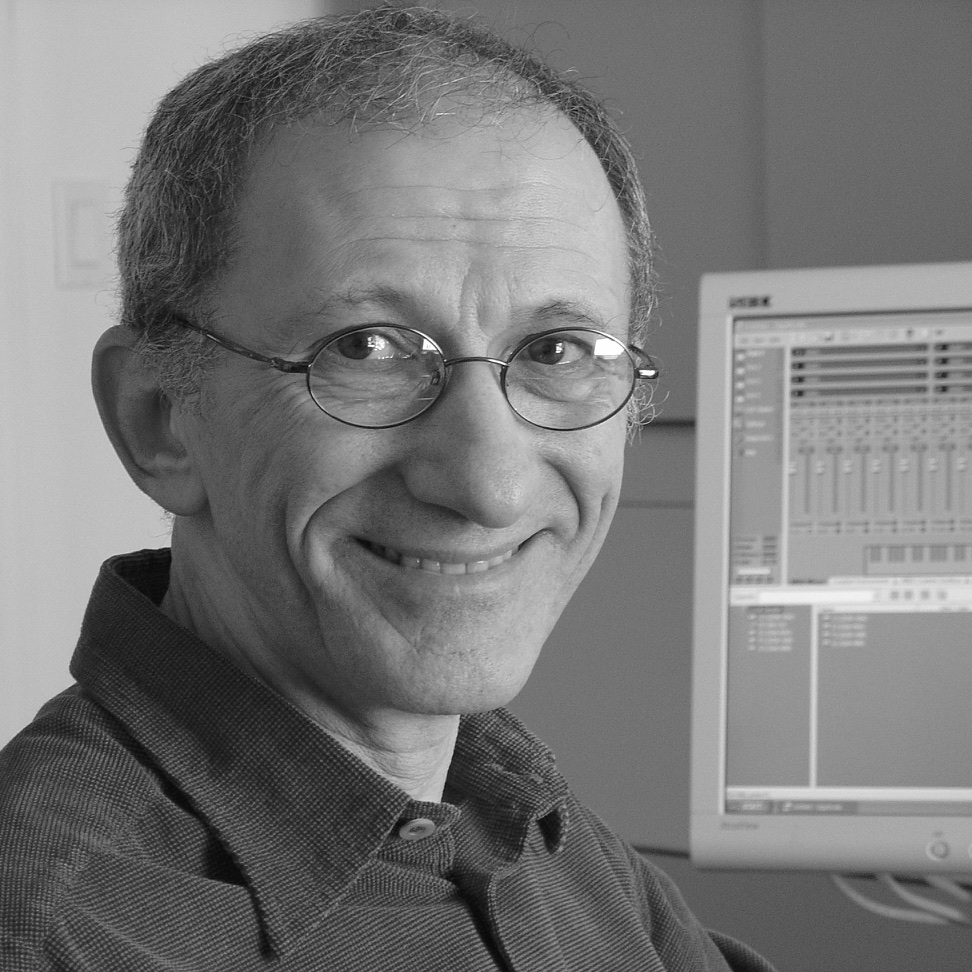
- Born: May 18, 1944; Montreal, Quebec, Canada
- Died: December 10, 2025 (aged 80)
- Occupation: Composer
- Years active: 1960s–2025
- Notable work: Being at Home with Claude

Richard Grégoire (May 18, 1944 – December 10, 2025) was a Canadian film and television composer from Montreal, Quebec. He was most noted for his work on the film Being at Home with Claude, for which he won the Genie Award for Best Original Score at the 13th Genie Awards in 1992.

Grégoire was a graduate of the Université de Montréal, where he was a student of Serge Garant. He later studied and worked with the Groupe de recherches musicales in Paris, France, under composer Pierre Schaeffer.

In television, he was best known for composing the theme music to the 1990 drama series Les Filles de Caleb, while in film he has worked most frequently, although not exclusively, on the films of director Yves Simoneau. His film credits have included Chocolate Eclair (Éclair au chocolat), Night Magic, Intimate Power (Pouvoire intime), In the Shadow of the Wind (Les Fous de Bassan), In the Belly of the Dragon (Dans le ventre du dragon), Perfectly Normal, Cruising Bar and Octobre.

Grégoire died on 10 December 2025, at the age of 81.

== Awards ==
In addition to his Genie win in 1992, he was a nominee on three other occasions, receiving nods at the 8th Genie Awards in 1987 for Exit, at the 10th Genie Awards in 1989 for The Heat Line (La ligne de chaleur), and at the 16th Genie Awards in 1996 for Water Child (L'Enfant d'eau).

He was also a two-time Jutra Award nominee for Best Original Music, receiving nods at the 1st Jutra Awards in 1999 for Streetheart (Le Cœur au poing) and at the 2nd Jutra Awards in 2000 for Memories Unlocked (Souvenirs intimes). At the 6th Jutra Awards in 2004, he was the recipient of the Jutra Hommage lifetime achievement prize.
