= In the Shadow of the Wind =

1987 film

- Film poster
- French: Les Fous de Bassan
- Directed by: Yves Simoneau
- Written by: Marcel Beaulieu; Sheldon Chad; Anne Hébert; Yves Simoneau
- Based on: Les fous de Bassan by Anne Hébert
- Produced by: Justine Héroux
- Starring: Steve Banner; Charlotte Valandrey; Laure Marsac; Marie Tifo
- Cinematography: Alain Dostie
- Edited by: Joële Van Effenterre
- Music by: Richard Grégoire
- Release date: 1987
- Running time: 105 minutes
- Country: Canada
- Language: French

In the Shadow of the Wind (French: Les Fous de Bassan) is a 1987 Canadian drama film, directed by Yves Simoneau. It was entered into the 37th Berlin International Film Festival.

Based on the novel by Anne Hébert, the film depicts a small town in the Gaspésie region of Quebec shaken by a rape and murder in 1936. The story is depicted from the perspective of Stevens Brown, played by Steve Banner in the 1936 storyline and by Jean-Louis Millette as an old man in the present day reflecting on the events. The cast also includes Charlotte Valandrey, Laure Marsac, Marie Tifo and Lothaire Bluteau.

The film was originally slated to be directed by Francis Mankiewicz, but he left the production due to a creative dispute with the producers. The community in Hébert's novel was an Anglo-Quebecer village, but the film's primary expected audience was a francophone audience in Quebec, leading to a dispute about whether to shoot the film in English and then dub it into French or vice versa.

The film received four Genie Award nominations at the 8th Genie Awards in 1987: Best Supporting Actress (Tifo), Best Art Direction/Production Design (Michel Proulx), Best Cinematography (Alain Dostie) and Best Costume Design (Nicole Pelletier).

== Cast ==
- Steve Banner as Stevens Brown
- Charlotte Valandrey as Olivia Atkins
- Laure Marsac as Nora Atkins
- Angèle Coutu as Maureen
- Paul Hébert as Thimothe Brown
- Marie Tifo as Irene Jones
- Bernard-Pierre Donnadieu as Priest
- Lothaire Bluteau as Perceval Brown
- Roland Chenail as Pere Atkins
- Guy Thauvette as Patrick Atkins
- Pierre Powers as Sydney Atkins
- Henri Chassé as Bob
- Denise Gagnon as Bea Brown
- Jocelyn Bérubé as Tony Bay
- Jean-Louis Millette as Vieux Stevens

== Production ==
Anne Hébert wanted Mireille Dansereau to direct the film adaption of her novel Les fous de Bassan. Yves Simoneau was selected to direct after Francis Mankiewicz withdrew from the project. Simoneau and Marcel Beaulieu wrote a script that Hébert accepted.

== Reception ==
The film was criticized for removing two characters from the book, the twin sisters Pam and Pat, and condensing the four painters into one character.

== Works cited ==
- Pallister, Janis (1995). The Cinema of Quebec: Masters in Their Own House. Associated University Presses. ISBN 0838635628.
