= Radisson (TV series) =

Canadian adventure television series

- Also known as: Tomahawk
- Genre: Adventure
- Created by: Monica Clare
- Written by: John Lucarotti
- Directed by: Pierre Gauvreau
- Theme music composer: John Lucarotti (lyrics); Johnny Cowell (music)
- Country of origin: Canada
- Original languages: English; French
- No. of seasons: 2
- No. of episodes: 39

Production
- Producer: Yves Bigras
- Running time: 30 minutes
- Production company: Omega Productions

Original release
- Network: CBC Television; Radio-Canada
- Release: 9 February 1957 – 25 January 1958

Radisson (titled Tomahawk in American markets) is a Canadian adventure television series that aired on CBC Television and Radio-Canada from 1957 to 1958.

== Premise ==
This series portrayed various adventures of the 17th-century explorer Pierre-Esprit Radisson (Jacques Godin) and his brother-in-law and fellow adventurer Médard des Groseilliers (René Caron). The pair explored places such as the Great Lakes and Hudson Bay in the context of the region's fur trade.

Radisson was conceived as a Canadian version of Davy Crockett, a successful Walt Disney Company series that portrayed an American explorer. Like the Crockett series, Radisson was to be supported with considerable merchandising such as children's apparel, dolls, rifles and board games.

== Production ==
Filming of the 39-episode series began on 20 August 1956 in studios at Montreal and with location shooting in surrounding areas such as the Saint Lawrence River and Île Perrot. The series was produced in English and French with a common cast. Scriptwriter John Lucarotti was paid $300 per episode, based on single airings per CBC station. The French scripts were translations by René Normand. It was among the first significant filmed television dramas produced in Canada.

Modern activities interfered with the production of this historically-set series. The filmmakers contended with planes from Dorval Airport, railroad activity and Saint Lawrence Seaway traffic which tipped the canoes used on the series. Adverse weather halted filming for several days and even mosquito attacks took their toll on the production. The originally-planned late-1956 debut was delayed until February 1957. Each episode was originally expected to cost $7000, but the actual production cost ultimately became $1.04 million for the series or over $26,000 per episode.

The series theme song was sung by Wally Koster, with its music and lyrics written by Johnny Cowell and John Lucarotti respectively.

== Reception ==
Following substantial preliminary publicity for the series, an episode in late February 1957 received higher viewership in the Toronto and Vancouver markets than other American programming, according to an Elliott-Haynes survey.

Ottawa Citizen television critic Bob Blackburn declared the theme song "so closely resembled Davy Crockett that it was a little sickening" and noted the high costs of the problematic production. Blackburn reported that critics deemed the series French debut on Radio-Canada "showy and artificial".

Helen Perodeau (a daughter of Charles Basil Price) expressed to The Gazette her sentiment that the show was a weak derivative of Davy Crockett, with major shortcomings in acting and production design.

Children in Ottawa who were surveyed by the CBC indicated a negative reaction to Radisson, complaining of artificial characters and pacing that was sluggish or awkward. One respondent noted that the same section of river was seen as the characters travelled by canoe "all the way from Lake Nipissing to Montreal".

Radisson was cancelled after its 39-episode run. Total revenues from Canadian and international markets of $146,200 represented a fraction of the production expenses resulting in a net loss of approximately $900,000.

== Cast ==
- Jacques Godin as Pierre Radisson
- Rene Caron as Groseilliers
- Raymond Royer as Onenga

== Scheduling ==
This half-hour series was broadcast on CBC Television's English service Saturdays at 7:00 p.m. (Eastern) in two seasons from 9 February to 4 May 1957, then from 2 November 1957 to 25 January 1958. The French version of Radisson on Radio-Canada aired on Sundays starting 3 February 1957.

Radisson was purchased by broadcasters in Australia and the United Kingdom. It was also syndicated to some United States markets under the title Tomahawk.
