= Exit (1986 film) =

- Directed by: Robert Ménard
- Written by: Claudette Messier; Monique H. Messier
- Produced by: Monique H. Messier; Robert Ménard
- Starring: Louise Marleau; Pierre Curzi; Michel Côté; Louise Portal
- Cinematography: Pierre Mignot
- Edited by: Michel Arcand
- Music by: Marie Bernard; Richard Grégoire
- Production company: Les Productions Vidéofilms
- Distributed by: Alliance Vivafilm
- Release date: October 3, 1986
- Running time: 99 minutes
- Country: Canada
- Language: French

Exit is a Canadian drama film, directed by Robert Ménard and released in 1986. The film stars Louise Marleau as Marie, a pianist and composer who is haunted by recurring visions of her late first husband John (John Wildman), leading her to experience intense feelings of guilt over both her indirect responsibility for his death in a car accident and her unresolved jealousy over the fact that he had been more successful in his career.

The cast also includes Pierre Curzi as Marie's current husband Michel, Michel Côté as her lover Simon and Louise Portal as her sister Jeanne, as well as Gabriel Panaccio, Sophie Clément, Marie-Michèle Desrosiers and Lise Roy in supporting roles.

The film was not positively received by critics. Matthew Fraser of The Globe and Mail wrote that "with that impressive roster of talent, few French-Canadian films have ever been so disappointing. Exit, made for a modest $1.5-million, will likely not join Le Declin and the handful of other quality French-language features coming out of Quebec these days. Exit probably won't even find its way out of Quebec: the film opens in Montreal today, but already the distributor is so convinced the movie is a turkey - or navet as they say in French - that he's ruled out a subtitled release for English Canada." For the Montreal Gazette, Bruce Bailey wrote that "we could have had an intelligent story about the expiation of guilt after that. But John's frequent re-appearances simply start looking ludicrous after a while and matters aren't helped any when we're asked to buy a bunch of hooey about "astral" projections."

The film received four Genie Award nominations at the 8th Genie Awards in 1987, for Best Art Direction/Production Design (François Séguin), Best Cinematography (Pierre Mignot), Best Costume Design (Michèle Hamel) and Best Original Score (Richard Grégoire, Marie Bernard).
