= Every Dog's Guide to the Playground =

- Directed by: Les Drew
- Written by: Les Drew
- Produced by: Bill Pettigrew
- Starring: Paul Brown; Luba Goy; Harvey Atkin
- Music by: Patrick Godfrey
- Production company: National Film Board of Canada
- Release date: 1991
- Running time: 10 minutes
- Country: Canada
- Language: English

Every Dog's Guide to the Playground is a Canadian animated short film, directed by Les Drew for the National Film Board of Canada and released in 1991. A sequel to his Genie Award-nominated 1986 short Every Dog's Guide to Complete Home Safety, the film revisits Wally (Paul Brown) as he deals with new safety challenges when Bernard (Harvey Atkin) and Honey (Luba Goy) are training him in the local playground for an "iron dog" competition.

Both films were broadcast in the United States on Cartoon Network's O Canada anthology series of NFB animated shorts, and were packaged together in 1996 for home video release as The Blue Dog Safety Video.
