= Intimate Power (1986 film) =

- Original movie poster
- French: Pouvoir intime
- Directed by: Yves Simoneau
- Written by: Yves Simoneau; Pierre Curzi
- Produced by: Claude Bonin; Francine Forest (delegate producer); Roger Frappier (associate producer)
- Starring: Jean-Louis Millette; Eric Brisebois; Pierre Curzi; Marie Tifo; Jacques Godin
- Cinematography: Guy Dufaux
- Edited by: André Corriveau
- Music by: Richard Grégoire
- Release dates: March 5, 1986 (Canada); July 16, 1987 (West Germany)
- Running time: 86 minutes
- Country: Canada
- Language: French

Intimate Power (French: Pouvoir intime) is a 1986 Canadian thriller film.

== Plot ==
A government ministry's fast-rising head of security asks a shadowy figure, Meursault, to steal a bag from an armoured truck. Meursault goes to Théo, a former night club owner, in prison for two years on false charges, who is being released in exchange for information about Montreal's underworld. Théo agrees to steal the bag for money and safe passage to the United States for himself and his son Robin. Théo brings in two helpers, Gilder, ex-con and set designer, and Roxanne, Gilder's friend, a tough-minded petty thief. Their elaborate plan blows up when a guard, Martial, takes his responsibilities too seriously.

== Cast ==
- Marie Tifo as Roxane
- Pierre Curzi as Gildor
- Jacques Godin as Theo
- Robert Gravel as Martial
- Jean-Louis Millette as Meurseault
- Yvan Ponton as H.B.
- Eric Brisebois as Robin

== Recognition ==
- 1986
  - Genie Award for Best Achievement in Art Direction/Production Design - Michel Proulx - Nominated
  - Genie Award for Best Achievement in Costume Design - Louise Jobin - Nominated
  - Genie Award for Best Achievement in Direction - Yves Simoneau - Nominated
  - Genie Award for Best Achievement in Editing - André Corriveau - Nominated
  - Genie Award for Best Motion Picture - Claude Bonin - Nominated
  - Genie Award for Best Performance by an Actor in a Supporting Role - Robert Gravel - Nominated
  - Genie Award for Best Performance by an Actress in a Leading Role - Marie Tifo - Nominated
  - Genie Award for Best Original Screenplay - Yves Simoneau, Pierre Curzi - Nominated
  - Genie Award for Best Achievement in Sound Editing - Andy Malcolm, Paul Dion, Jules Le Noir - Nominated
