= Pierre Mignot =

Canadian cinematographer

Pierre Mignot (born February 23, 1944, in Montreal, Quebec) is a Canadian cinematographer.

== Filmography ==
=== Feature film ===
Year	Title	Director	Notes
1973	Des armes et les hommes	André Melançon	With Georges Dufaux
1975	Une nuit en Amérique	Jean Chabot	
1975	Cher Théo	Jean Chabot	
1977	J.A. Martin Photographer	Jean Beaudin	
1977	La p'tite violence	Hélène Girard	
1980	Cordélia	Jean Beaudin	
1980	Fuir	Hélène Girard	
1980	The Coffin Affair	Jean-Claude Labrecque	
1981	De jour en jour		
1982	Come Back to the 5 & Dime, Jimmy Dean, Jimmy Dean	Robert Altman	
1982	A Day in a Taxi	Robert Ménard	
1983	Lucien Brouillard	Bruno Carrière	
1983	Maria Chapdelaine	Gilles Carle	
1983	Streamers	Robert Altman	
1983	Marc-Aurèle Fortin: 1888-1970	André Gladu	With Michel Brault
1984	Secret Honor	Robert Altman	
1984	Mario	Jean Beaudin	
1985	Fool for Love	Robert Altman	
1985	O.C. and Stiggs	Robert Altman	
1986	The Boy in Blue	Charles Jarrott	
1986	Anne Trister	Léa Pool	
1986	Exit	Robert Ménard	
1987	Beyond Therapy	Robert Altman	
1988	Straight for the Heart	Léa Pool	
1989	Cruising Bar	Robert Ménard	
1990	Rafales	André Melançon	
1991	Love Crazy	Robert Ménard	
1991	Une nuit à l'école	Alain Chartrand	
1992	Phantom Life	Jacques Leduc	
1993	Les mots perdus	Marcel Simard	With Philippe Lavalette
1994	Desire in Motion	Léa Pool	
1994	Chili's Blues	Charles Binamé	
1994	Prêt-à-Porter	Robert Altman	
1996	Not Me!	Pierre Gang	
1998	Nô	Robert Lepage	
1999	Alegría	Franco Dragone	
1999	L'île de sable	Johanne Prégent	
1999	Ladies Room	Gabriella Cristiani	
2000	The 6th Day	Roger Spottiswoode	
2000	The Orphan Muses	Robert Favreau	
2004	The Blue Butterfly	Léa Pool	
2004	Bittersweet Memories	Denise Filiatrault	
2005	C.R.A.Z.Y.	Jean-Marc Vallée	
2006	A Sunday in Kigali	Robert Favreau	
2006	Without Her	Jean Beaudin	
2006	A Family Secret	Ghyslaine Côté	
2006	Romeo and Juliet	Yves Desgagnés	
2007	Surviving My Mother	Émile Gaudreault	
2008	Cruising Bar 2	Robert Ménard	
2009	A Happy Man	Robert Ménard	
2010	The Last Escape	Léa Pool	
2010	Route 132	Louis Bélanger	
2012	La vallée des larmes	Maryanne Zéhil	
2013	La maison du pêcheur	Alain Chartrand	
2013	Arwad	Dominique Chila; Samer Najari	
2016	Bad Seeds	Louis Bélanger	
2016	The Other Side of November	Maryanne Zéhil	
2019	Living 100 MPH	Louis Bélanger	

=== Television ===
TV movies

Year	Title	Director	Notes
1985	The Laundromat	Robert Altman	
1987	Basements	Robert Altman	
1988	Onzième spéciale	Micheline Lanctôt	
1993	Embrasse-moi, c'est pour la vie	Jean-Guy Noël	
1995	Vanished	George Kaczender	
1995	Hiroshima	Koreyoshi Kurahara; Roger Spottiswoode	With Shôhei Andô
1995	No Greater Love	Richard T. Heffron	
1996	Everything to Gain	Michael Miller	
1997	L'enfant des Appalaches	Jean-Philippe Duval	
1999	P.T. Barnum	Simon Wincer	
2000	Noriega: God's Favorite	Roger Spottiswoode	
2002	Lathe of Heaven	Philip Haas	
2005	Choice: The Henry Morgentaler Story	John L'Ecuyer	

TV series

Year	Title	Director
1992	Shehaweh	Jean Beaudin

== Awards and nominations ==
He is a four-time Canadian Film Award and Genie Award winner for Best Cinematography, winning at the 28th Canadian Film Awards in 1977 for J.A. Martin Photographer (J.A. Martin photographe), at the 5th Genie Awards in 1984 for Maria Chapdelaine, at the 6th Genie Awards in 1985 for Mario and at the 8th Genie Awards in 1987 for Anne Trister.

He was also nominated in 1980 for Cordélia, in 1983 for A Day in a Taxi (Une journée en taxi), in 1987 for Exit, in 1989 for Straight for the Heart (À corps perdu), in 1990 for Cruising Bar, in 1992 for Phantom Life (La vie fantôme), in 1999 for Alegría, in 2004 for Bittersweet Memories (Ma vie en cinémascope) and in 2005 for C.R.A.Z.Y..
