= Night of the Flood =

- French: La nuit du déluge
- Directed by: Bernar Hébert
- Written by: Bernar Hébert
- Produced by: Michel Ouellette
- Starring: Geneviève Rochette; Julie McClemens; Jacques Godin
- Cinematography: Serge Ladouceur
- Edited by: Philippe Ralet
- Music by: Serge LaForest; Gaëtan Gravel
- Production companies: Antenna; Cine Qua Non Films
- Release date: August 29, 1996 (MWFF)
- Running time: 91 minutes
- Country: Canada
- Language: French

Night of the Flood (French: La nuit du déluge) is a Canadian drama film, directed by Bernar Hébert and released in 1996. An experiment in integrating dance and theatrical staging into cinema, the film tells the story of a child born in a flooded land; his mother (Geneviève Rochette) was the sole survivor of the flood after floating to safety on a raft built by the child's deceased father (Jacques Godin) and being cared for by a guardian angel (Julie McClemens). The film also prominently features the dance troupe O Vertigo, performing dances choreographed by Ginette Laurin.

The film premiered at the 1996 Montreal World Film Festival.

The film received four Genie Award nominations at the 18th Genie Awards in 1997, for Best Cinematography (Serge Ladouceur), Best Art Direction/Production Design (Serge Bureau), Best Costume Design (Yveline Bonjean and Liz Vandal) and Best Original Score (Serge LaForest and Gaëtan Gravel).
