= Chili's Blues =

- French: C'était le 12 du 12 et Chili avait les blues
- Directed by: Charles Binamé
- Written by: José Fréchette
- Produced by: Louise Gendron
- Starring: Roy Dupuis; Lucie Laurier
- Cinematography: Pierre Mignot
- Edited by: Gaétan Huot
- Music by: Richard Grégoire
- Production company: Les Productions du Cerf
- Distributed by: Alliance Vivafilm
- Release date: August 26, 1994 (MWFF)
- Running time: 100 minutes
- Country: Canada
- Language: French

Chili's Blues (French: C'était le 12 du 12 et Chili avait les blues, lit. "It Was the 12th of December and Chili Had the Blues") is a Canadian romantic drama film, directed by Charles Binamé and released in 1994. Set in 1963 and taking place in a train station in Montreal where passengers are temporarily stranded due to a snowstorm, the film centres on the interactions between Pierre-Paul (Roy Dupuis), a salesman, and Chili (Lucie Laurier), a depressed college student who is considering suicide, as they meet and fall in love while waiting for train services to resume.

The cast also includes Joëlle Morin, Julie Deslauriers, Emmanuel Bilodeau, Pierre Curzi, Jean-François Pichette, Normand Chouinard, Élise Guilbault and Isabelle Brouillette.

The film premiered on August 26, 1994 at the Montreal World Film Festival.
