= Sharon Riis =

Canadian writer

- Born: 1947; Longview, Alberta
- Died: May 20, 2016 (aged 68–69)
- Occupations: novelist, short stories, screenwriter
- Writing career
- Period: 1970s-2016
- Notable works: The True Story of Ida Johnson, Savage Messiah

Sharon Riis (1947 - May 20, 2016) was a Canadian novelist, short story writer and screenwriter.

She was nominated for the Books in Canada First Novel Award in 1976 for her debut novel The True Story of Ida Johnson, published by Women's Press. Her second novel, Midnight Twilight Tourist Zone, was published in 1989 by Douglas & McIntyre. Riis also published short stories in various Canadian literary magazines.

She won the Genie Award for Best Adapted Screenplay at the 23rd Genie Awards for Savage Messiah. She was also nominated for Best Original Screenplay at the 4th Genie Awards for Latitude 55°, which she cowrote with John Juliani, and at the 8th Genie Awards for Loyalties, which she cowrote with Anne Wheeler.

In addition, she was a writer and story editor for the television series Bliss and Wapos Bay: The Series, and wrote the television films Change of Heart and The Wake.

Riis died on May 20, 2016.
