= Denise Gagnon =

Canadian actress (1936–2024)

- Born: September 17, 1936
- Died: August 14, 2024 (aged 87); Quebec City, Quebec, Canada
- Occupation: Actress
- Years active: 1982 - 2014

Denise Gagnon (17 September 1936 – 14 August 2024) was a Canadian actress.

== Life and career ==
Gagnon was in the first cohort of the Conservatoire de Québec in 1961. Subsequently, she taught performers in the same place for some years. Gagnon died in Quebec City on 14 August 2024, at the age of 87.

== Filmography ==
=== Movies ===
- Red Eyes - 1982, as Sonia
- In the Shadow of the Wind (Les Fous de Bassan) - 1987, as Béa Brown
- Les Heures précieuses - 1989
- Octobre - 1994, as Waitress
- The Novena (La Neuvaine) - 2005, as grandmother
- Route 132 - 2010, as Gilberte Amyot
- Mourning for Anna (Trois temps après la mort d'Anna) — 2010, as grandmother
- The Masters of Suspense (Les Maîtres du suspense) - 2014, as Quentin's mother

=== Short film ===
- Recharge (1995)

=== Television ===
==== Television series ====
- Le Parc des braves (1986) as Clémence Saillant
- Avec un grand A (Episode On ne choisit pas qui on aime, 1992) as Claudette
- Scoop (Episode Jeunes en détresse!, 1992) as Mme Fontaine
- Cormoran (2 Episodes) (1993) as Perpétue Lamothe
- Le Sorcier (1994) as Veuve Dupuis
- L'Auberge du chien noir (2003) as Germaine Trudeau

==== Telefilms ====
- Le Grand jour (1988)
- Desjardins (1990) as Vieille dame
