= Dads and Kids =

1986 film directed by Christian Bruyère

- Directed by: Christian Bruyère
- Release date: 1986
- Country: Canada
- Language: English

Dads and Kids is a Canadian documentary film, directed by Christian Bruyère and released in 1986. The film examines the relationships of single fathers with their children after separation or divorce.

The film won the Genie Award for Best Feature Length Documentary at the 8th Genie Awards.
