= The Morning Man =

1986 Canadian film

- French: Un matin, une vie
- Directed by: Danièle J. Suissa
- Written by: Clarke Wallace
- Produced by: Gaston Cousineau; Danièle J. Suissa
- Starring: Bruno Doyon; Kerrie Keane; Marc Strange; Mark Blutman
- Cinematography: René Verzier
- Edited by: Yves Langlois
- Music by: Diane Juster
- Production companies: 3 Thèmes Inc. Productions SDA
- Release date: September 26, 1986
- Running time: 94 minutes
- Country: Canada
- Language: English

The Morning Man (French: Un matin, une vie) is a 1986 Canadian crime drama film, directed by Danièle J. Suissa. A fictionalization of the true story of Robert Lavallée-Ménard, a convicted bank robber who escaped from prison and successfully established a career as a local morning radio host in Chicoutimi, Quebec, before being recaptured, the film stars Bruno Doyon in the title role as Paul Nadeau-Ménard, an escaped convict and radio host who enters a romantic relationship with local doctor Kate Johnson (Kerrie Keane) after going to her for treatment of the injuries he incurred in his escape, and Marc Strange as John Mailer, the police detective pursuing him.

Lavallée-Ménard, who had been paroled from prison and was again working as a radio host by the time the film was made, directly participated in its promotion.

The film was not positively received by critics. Matthew Fraser of The Globe and Mail heavily criticized it, both for downplaying the real criminal and broadcasting aspects of the story in favour of a fictionalized romance, and for shooting the film in English even though the real-life story involved francophone Quebecers.

It was one of five films nominated for Best Quebec Film at the 1987 Montreal World Film Festival, but lost to Night Zoo (Un zoo la nuit). René Verzier received a Genie Award nomination for Best Cinematography at the 8th Genie Awards in 1987.
