= Return to Departure: The Biography of a Painting =

1986 Canadian documentary film

- Directed by: Kirk Tougas
- Produced by: Kirk Tougas
- Distributed by: Canadian Filmmakers Distribution Centre
- Release date: 1986
- Running time: 83 minutes
- Country: Canada
- Language: English

Return to Departure: The Biography of a Painting (or, Watching Pigment Dry and Other Realisms) is a Canadian documentary film, directed by Kirk Tougas and released in 1986. The film centres on painter Chi O'Farrell, documenting his process from start to finish of creating his painting "Return to Departure", against a soundtrack consisting largely of radio talk and music with some narration by O'Farrell about his own thoughts on the painting.

The film received a Genie Award nomination for Best Feature Length Documentary at the 8th Genie Awards in 1987.
