= Jerry Snell =

Canadian actor (1959–2015)

Jerry Snell (April 17, 1959 in Vancouver, British Columbia – August 7, 2015 in Bangkok, Thailand) was a Canadian actor.

== Filmography ==
- 1986: Equinox (1986 film) (Équinoxe) : Jos
- 1987: Night Zoo (Un zoo la nuit) : American
- 1991: Nelligan : Marin
- 1992 : "Exit pour nomades" : "Pierre Bastien"
- 1992: L'Automne sauvage : John Kendall
- 1993: Map of the Human Heart : Boleslaw
- 1993: Matusalem : Voyou du village
- 1995: Motel : Mat
- 2001: February 15, 1839 (15 février 1839) : Lewis Harkin
