= Equinox (1986 film) =

1986 Canadian film directed by Arthur Lamothe

- French: Équinoxe
- Directed by: Arthur Lamothe
- Written by: Arthur Lamothe; Gilles Carle; Pierre-Yves Pépin
- Produced by: Nicole Lamothe
- Starring: Jacques Godin
- Cinematography: Guy Dufaux
- Edited by: François Gill
- Music by: Jean Sauvageau
- Production company: Les Ateliers audiovisuels du Québec
- Release date: August 25, 1986 (MWFF)
- Running time: 83 minutes
- Country: Canada
- Language: French

Equinox (French: Équinoxe) is a Canadian drama film, directed by Arthur Lamothe and released in 1986. Lamothe's first narrative feature film in 18 years after having concentrated exclusively on documentary films since 1968's Dust from Underground (Poussière sur la ville), the film stars Jacques Godin as Guillaume, a man returning to his hometown for the first time since being wrongfully convicted of a crime he did not commit, in order to confront the former friend whose false testimony resulted in Guillaume being sent to prison.

The film was shot in the rural Îles de Sorel near Sorel-Tracy, Quebec, in 1985, and premiered at the 1986 Montreal World Film Festival.

== Cast ==
- Jacques Godin as Guillaume
- Marthe Mercure as Rita
- Ariane Frédérique as Nathalie
- André Melançon as Bert (as André Mélançon)
- Luc Proulx as Arthur
- Jerry Snell as Jos

== Critical response ==
In his 2003 book A Century of Canadian Cinema, Gerald Pratley called the film a triumph of cinematography over script. For the Montreal Gazette, Bruce Bailey dismissed the film as "something of a cross between a Beachcombers episode and something from Walt Disney's Adventureland", concluding that it "has more depth than something made for TV. But only barely."

José Arroyo of Cinema Canada reviewed the film more positively, writing that "the film works best as a psychological drama with Guillaume's journey of self-discovery as a focus...Lamothe's experience as a documentary filmmaker here serves him very well." He concluded that "Equinoxe could have used a tighter structure. But it is very well acted and beautifully shot. I find the image of a leonine Godin, paddling a canoe through marshes to come to a rendez-vous with his past, unforgettable. A film that has this much going for it deserves to be seen by more people."

== Awards ==
The film received two Genie Award nominations at the 8th Genie Awards in 1987, for Best Cinematography (Guy Dufaux) and Best Original Song (Gilles Vigneault for "Les îles de l'enfance"). Vigneault's song initially lost to Danielle Messia's song "De la main gauche", from the film Anne Trister, which later had its award rescinded when it was discovered that the song was not original to the film, but in fact had previously appeared on one of Messia's own albums five years earlier, with Vigneault's song later named the new winner of the award.
