= Sitting in Limbo (1986 film) =

- Directed by: John N. Smith
- Written by: Richard Nichol
- Produced by: John N. Smith; David Wilson
- Starring: Pat Dillon; Fabian Gibbs
- Cinematography: Barry Perles; Andreas Poulsson
- Edited by: David Wilson
- Distributed by: National Film Board
- Release date: August 28, 1986
- Running time: 96 minutes
- Country: Canada
- Language: English

Sitting in Limbo is a 1986 Canadian docudrama film directed by John N. Smith. Developed through interviews and improvisational work with a group of Black Canadian youth in Montreal, the film stars Pat Dillon as Pat, a young woman who moves in with her boyfriend Fabian (Fabian Gibbs) after getting pregnant.

The film was produced by the National Film Board, through its Alternative Drama program.

The film premiered at the Montreal World Film Festival in August 1986.

The film's soundtrack consisted primarily of reggae recordings by Jimmy Cliff.

== Awards ==
At the Montreal World Film Festival, the film won the award for best Canadian film shown outside the competitive program. At the 1986 Festival of Festivals, the film received a special citation from the Canadian film award jury.

The film was also a shortlisted finalist for the Quebec Association of Film Critics award for the best film made in Quebec in 1986.

The film garnered three Genie Award nominations at the 8th Genie Awards in 1987:

- Best Director: John N. Smith
- Best Original Screenplay: Richard Nichol
- Best Sound: Hans Oomes, Richard Nichol, Shelley Craig and Jean-Pierre Joutel
