= Lucie Laurier =

Canadian actress from Quebec (born 1975)

- Born: 19 March 1975 (age 51); Greenfield Park, Quebec

Lucie Laurier (born 19 March 1975) is a Canadian actress from Quebec. She is most noted for her performances in the films Anne Trister, for which she received a Genie Award nomination for Best Supporting Actress at the 8th Genie Awards in 1987, and Bon Cop, Bad Cop, for which she received a Jutra Award nomination for Best Supporting Actress at the 9th Jutra Awards in 2007.

== Filmography ==
- 1985 : Le Vieillard et l'enfant
- 1986 : Henri : Liliane
- 1986 : Anne Trister : Sarah
- 1987 : Le diable à quatre
- 1989 : Chambres en ville (television series) : Caroline #1
- 1990 : Les Filles de Caleb (television series) : Émilie (jeune)
- 1991 : Love Me (Love-moi) : Danielle
- 1994 : Chili's Blues (C'était le 12 du 12 et Chili avait les blues) : Chili
- 1995 : Black List (Liste noire) : Valérie Savard
- 1996 : Love Me, Love Me Not (J'aime, j'aime pas) : Winnifred
- 1996 : Tarzan :(television series) : Blanche Dubois
- 1997 : Strip Search : Billy
- 1997 : Contrat sur un terroriste (The Assignment) : Paris Lover
- 1999 : Mumford : Pretty Coed
- 2001 : Stiletto Dance (TV movie) : Lena
- 2001 : Second Coming : Katja
- 2001 : Don't Say a Word : Vanessa
- 2003 : Jean Moulin, une affaire française (television series) : Colette Jacques
- 2003 : How My Mother Gave Birth to Me During Menopause (Comment ma mère accoucha de moi durant sa ménopause) : Cassandre
- 2003 : Seducing Doctor Lewis (La Grande séduction) : Ève Beauchemin
- 2003 : Virginie (television series) : Karine Constantin" (2003–2005)
- 2004 : Fortier V (television series) : Sagash
- 2004 : Cauchemar d'amour (television series) : Taille 0
- 2004 : Caméra café (television series)
- 2004 : C'est pas moi, c'est l'autre
- 2005 : Les Invincibles (television series) : Jolène
- 2005 : Trudeau II: Maverick in the Making (feuilleton TV) : Suzette Trudeau
- 2005 : Masters of Horror: Chocolate (television series) : Catherine Duprés
- 2006 : À part des autres : Margot
- 2006 : François en série (television series) : Émilie
- 2006 : René : Corinne Coté-Lévesque
- 2006 : Bon Cop, Bad Cop : Suzie
- 2007 : Nitro : Morgane
- 2013 : The Dismantling (Le Démantèlement)
- 2017 : Bon Cop, Bad Cop 2 : Suzie
- 2019: Mont Foster
