= The Boy in Blue (1986 film) =

1986 film by Charles Jarrott

- Theatrical release poster
- Directed by: Charles Jarrott
- Written by: Douglas Bowie
- Produced by: Steve North; John Kemeny; Denis Héroux
- Starring: Nicolas Cage; Christopher Plummer; Cynthia Dale; David Naughton; Melody Anderson; Sean Sullivan
- Cinematography: Pierre Mignot
- Edited by: Rit Wallis
- Music by: Roger Webb
- Production companies: Canadian Broadcasting Corporation; Regatta Productions; Téléfilm Canada
- Distributed by: 20th Century Fox
- Release date: January 17, 1986
- Running time: 93 minutes
- Country: Canada
- Language: English
- Budget: CAD$7.7 million
- Box office: $275,000

The Boy in Blue is a 1986 Canadian drama film directed by Charles Jarrott and starring Nicolas Cage. The film, which was written by Douglas Bowie and co-produced by Steve North, John Kemeny, and Denis Héroux, was distributed by 20th Century Fox. The filming took place in Quebec and Ontario, Canada, which was eventually released for North American theatres on January 17, 1986. The story is based on a true story about the life of Toronto sculler Ned Hanlan.

== Plot ==
This drama follows Ned Hanlan, who is known to be a Canadian competitive rowing champion. Ned Hanlan is adopted by a gambler named Bill, who promotes the boy on the sculling circuit for his own monetary gain. As a young man, Ned is very trouble-prone but does not lack the fierce determination needed in his attempt to become a formidable athlete. In this attempt, a businessman named Knox assumes control of Hanlan's career who backs Ned for his own personal gain and discards him when this gain is no longer in sight. Through Knox, Ned meets and falls for the niece of the businessman, Margaret. Hanlan's professional success is capped by his marriage to Margaret.

== Cast ==
- Nicolas Cage as Ned Hanlan
- Cynthia Dale as Margaret
- Christopher Plummer as Knox
- Sean Sullivan as Walter
- David Naughton as Bill
- Melody Anderson as Dulcie
- Jeff Wincott as Riley
- Ian D. Clark as Aussie

== Release ==
The film had a test release on January 17, 1986, on 44 screens and grossed $94,261 for the weekend.

== Reception ==
The film received several negative critical reviews. The review aggregator website Rotten Tomatoes has no score for critics, but a 45% approval rating for audiences based on 712 reviews. On Metacritic, the film has a weighted average score of 30 out of 100 based on four critics, indicating "generally unfavorable" reviews.

The New York Times believed the film did not go beyond the cliché of movies about athletes, believing these types of films follow an obligatory formula. When the formula does not work, the film then "looks just plain silly", which The New York Times believed was the case with this film. In the eyes of that publication, the film lacked excitement and the performances were no more exciting than the script.

The Montreal Gazette's review of the production was also quite negative. To this critic, the subject of the film is particularly unpromising, believing that most people would not enjoy "the story of a boy who was better than anybody else at pulling two sticks through the water". The script was also harshly criticized, stating that it is hard to tell whether some actors are not doing a good job, or if it is just the script not allowing them to.

The Globe and Mail also give a harsh review, believing that the film's major purpose is proving a showcase for an American actor's (Nicolas Cage) chest. The Globe and Mail critic had an issue with the casting of Nicolas Cage, as he is an American actor who makes no effort to Canadianize himself; the role could have potentially made a Canadian a star. The supporting performances were also seen as terrible, which were blamed on the director, Charles Jarrott.

Pierre Mignot's photography was one of the scarce positives to an otherwise negatively-reviewed film.

== Awards and nominations ==
The film received three nominations for Genie Awards, which are given out annually by the Academy of Canadian Cinema and Television to recognize the best of Canadian cinema from 1980 to 2012.

Genie Award nominations:

Sean Sullivan – Best performance by an actor in a supporting role

William Beeton – Best achievement in art direction

Don White / David Appleby / Dan Latour – Best achievement in sound editing
