= Dancing in the Dark (1986 film) =

1986 film by Leon Marr

- Promotional film poster
- Directed by: Leon Marr
- Screenplay by: Leon Marr
- Based on: Dancing in the Dark by Joan Barfoot
- Produced by: Anthony Kramreither; Don Haig (executive producer); John Ryan (co-producer)
- Starring: Martha Henry; Neil Munro
- Cinematography: Vic Sarin
- Edited by: Thomas Berner
- Music by: Erik Satie
- Production companies: Brightstar Films; Canadian Broadcasting Corporation; Film House Group
- Distributed by: New World Pictures; Shapiro Entertainment
- Release date: October 17, 1986
- Running time: 93 minutes
- Country: Canada
- Language: English
- Budget: $800,000

Dancing in the Dark is a 1986 Canadian drama film directed and written by Leon Marr, based on the 1982 novel Dancing in the Dark by Joan Barfoot. It was produced by Anthony Kramreither, Don Haig, and co-produced by John Ryan. The film is about a housewife, Edna (Martha Henry), whose life revolves around her husband Henry (Neil Munro). Edna spends her days cleaning the house, making sure that it looks spotless and fulfilling her husband's every need in the process. After Henry betrays Edna's trust, she murders him and then finds herself in a psychiatric hospital where she relives her old life by writing in her journal.

Dancing in the Dark is considered a feminist film. The story shows the legal system wavering in favour of Edna, as she is placed in a psychiatric hospital instead of a prison after her crime.

Dancing in the Dark premiered at the Cannes Film Festival in May 1986. It was then shown in September 1986 as part of the Perspectives Canada programme of the Toronto Festival of Festivals, now known as the Toronto International Film Festival. It was shown later that month at the New York Film Festival.

== Plot ==
The story begins as the present unfolds along with scenes from the past about Edna, a woman in a hospital who each day writes down her memories. She is a devoted housewife, an excellent cook, and in love with her husband Harry who often compliments her on her cooking, fills their conversations with his life at work, and they seem quite normal if perhaps a little boring. Edna's attitude towards herself suddenly changes resulting in her ending her 20-year marriage by stabbing Harry with a kitchen knife. Edna cannot (or will not) talk to her doctor, and nurses have to take care of her basic needs. Edna's hospital surroundings give way to the bright colours of her home life as her memories of her past life surface as she writes.

== Cast ==
- Martha Henry as Edna
- Neil Munro as Henry
- Richard Monette as The Doctor
- Rosemary Dunsmore as The nurse
- Brenda Bazinet as Susan
- Anne Butler as Beautician
- Vince Metcalfe as Accountant and Party Guest
- Janet Bailey as Night Nurse
- Carole Galloway as Dottie Franklin
- Marshall Margolis as Lawyer
- Florence Catalatio-Carenza as Cleaning Lady
- Barbara McMullen as Neighbour
- Olwyn Chipman as Policewoman
- Alan Rose as Policeman

== Release ==
Dancing in the Dark was first shown at the Cannes Film Festival in May 1986 in Cannes, France. It was premiered in the most prestigious category within the festival.

The film was shown at the 1986 Festival of Festivals in Toronto on September 5, 1986. Martha Henry received a Special Jury Citation from the Best Canadian Film jury.

Dancing in the Dark was shown at Alice Tully Hall in New York City at the New York Film Festival on September 25 and September 27, 1986.

== Reaction ==
Before Dancing in the Dark, Anthony Kramreither was not considered to be a prestigious producer and many critics would avoid going to see his work. After the release of Dancing in the Dark at the Cannes Film Festival in August 1986 critics sought out his work and were writing generous reviews about his films.

The film got mixed reviews. In Canada reviews were generally positive, and the film helped jumpstart Leon Marr's directorial career. The French newspaper L'Humanité, which at the time was a communist newspaper, wrote that the film was "fabulous" and "highly original".

The American and the English generally did not appreciate the film. English film critic Derek Malcolm said that the film was "Terrible, embarrassingly sincere, and also embarrassingly inept". American film critic Dave Kehr said the film was "like a second-rate film of the seventies".

In 2020, Encore+, a YouTube channel dedicated to preserving and showcasing classic Canadian films and TV shows created by the Canada Media Fund in partnership with a wealth of industry partners, brought back Dancing in the Dark for contemporary audiences. The response was immediate and highly positive given the film's subject matter, accomplished cast and crew. That same year, an Encore+ Original was created featuring leading lady - and Canadian icon - Martha Henry looking back on the making of the film. It was extremely popular globally.

== Awards ==
- 1986 Toronto International Film Festival Best Canadian Feature Film - Special Jury Citation, 1986
- International Filmfestival Mannheim-Heidelberg, Mannheim - Special Mention, Interfilm Jury, 1986
- International Filmfestival Mannheim-Heidelberg, Mannheim - Special Mention, Catholic Film Jury, 1986
- 8th Genie Awards, Toronto: Genie Award for Best Achievement in Art Direction/Production Design - Lillian Sarafinchan, 1987
- 8th Genie Awards, Toronto: Genie Award for Best Performance by an Actress in a Leading Role - Martha Henry, 1987
- 8th Genie Awards, Toronto: Genie Award for Best Adapted Screenplay - Leon Marr, 1987
- 8th Genie Awards, Toronto: Nominee: Leon Marr, Direction, 1987
- 8th Genie Awards, Toronto: Nominee: Best Motion Picture, 1987
- Valladolid International Film Festival, Valladolid: Nominee, Best Film 1986
