= Jan Kiesser =

Canadian cinematographer

- Occupation: Cinematographer

Jan Kiesser is a cinematographer who won a Leo Award for the 2006 film Fido and many other nominations including a Primetime Emmy Award.
