= Alain Dostie =

Alain Dostie (born September 12, 1943) is a Canadian cinematographer, film director and screenwriter. His work includes Silk, The Red Violin and The Confessional. He was nominated for a Genie Award for Best Achievement in Cinematography for his work in Silk.

== Recognition ==
- 1987 Genie Award for Best Achievement in Cinematography - In the Shadow of the Wind (Les Fous de Bassan) - Nominated
- 1993 Genie Award for Best Achievement in Cinematography - Thirty-Two Short Films About Glenn Gould - Won
- 1996 Genie Award for Best Achievement in Cinematography - The Confessional - Nominated
- 1999 Genie Award for Best Achievement in Cinematography - The Red Violin - Won
- 1999 Jutra Award for Best Cinematography - The Red Violin - Won
- 2001 Gemini Award for Best Photography in a Dramatic Program or Series - Nuremberg - Nominated
- 2002 Jutra Award Best Cinematography - February 15, 1839 (15 février 1839) - Nominated
- 2008 Genie Award for Best Achievement in Cinematography - Silk - Nominee
