= The Wedding (1982 film) =

1982 Venezuelan film

- Film poster
- Spanish: La Boda
- Directed by: Thaelman Urguelles
- Release date: 1982
- Country: Venezuela
- Language: Spanish

The Wedding (Spanish: La Boda) is a 1982 Venezuelan film directed by Thaelman Urguelles and co-produced by Universidad de los Andes. It is about the dictatorship of Marcos Pérez Jiménez (1948–1958). Public review about La Boda Urgelles handles with skill a complex movie that moves from present to past fluently. Several plots crosses in a wedding party, portraying not only Venezuela's transition from dictatorship to democracy in 1958, but the old and new typologies that characterized its people.
