= ?O, Zoo!: The Making of a Fiction Film =

1986 Canadian documentary film

- Directed by: Philip Hoffman
- Written by: Philip Hoffman
- Produced by: Philip Hoffman
- Music by: Tucker Zimmerman
- Release date: 1986
- Running time: 23 minutes
- Country: Canada
- Language: English

?O, Zoo!: The Making of a Fiction Film is a 1986 experimental Canadian documentary film directed by Philip Hoffman.

== Synopsis ==
Based in part around the making of Peter Greenaway's 1985 film A Zed & Two Noughts and constructed primarily from found footage made by his grandfather who once worked as a newsreel cameraman, the film interrogates the distinction between fiction and documentary filmmaking through various meditations on the narrative assumptions and inventions that people attach to the neutrality of visual images; its most noted scene narrates the death of an elephant, without ever actually showing the animal.

== Reception ==
The film premiered at the 1986 Festival of Festivals. It received a Genie Award nomination for Best Feature Length Documentary at the 8th Genie Awards.

It is also his most successful film to date.

== See also ==
- Postmodernist film
