= Danièle J. Suissa =

Canadian film director

Danièle J. Suissa is a Moroccan-born film and television director, who has worked predominantly in Canada and France. She is most noted for her 1989 television film No Blame, a drama about a woman testing positive for HIV/AIDS.

Born in Casablanca and raised in Paris, France, she began her career as a theatre director for the Théâtre du Palais-Royal before moving to Canada in her early 20s. In Canada she began working on television and theatrical films, including Kate Morris, Vice President, Divine Sarah, The Morning Man and Martha, Ruth and Edie.

No Blame won the Red Cross Award at the 1989 Monte-Carlo Television Festival, and Suissa received a Gemini Award nomination for Best Direction in a Dramatic Program or Miniseries at the 4th Gemini Awards in 1989.
