= Transit (1986 film) =

1986 Canadian short film

- Directed by: Richard Roy
- Written by: Richard Roy
- Produced by: Jean-Roch Marcotte
- Starring: Michel Côté; Marie Laberge
- Cinematography: Daniel Jobin
- Edited by: Jean-Guy Montpetit
- Music by: Yves Laferrière
- Production company: Les Productions du regard
- Distributed by: Cinéma Libre; Parlimage
- Release date: 1986
- Running time: 28 minutes
- Country: Canada
- Language: French

Transit is a Canadian drama short film, directed by Richard Roy and released in 1986. The film stars Michel Côté as Laurent, an ex-convict who has been released from prison and is building a relationship with Marcelle (Marie Laberge).

The film was a Genie Award nominee for Best Live Action Short Drama at the 8th Genie Awards.
