= Tables of Content =

- Directed by: Wendy Tilby
- Produced by: Wendy Tilby
- Animation by: Wendy Tilby
- Production company: Emily Carr College of Art and Design
- Distributed by: National Film Board of Canada
- Release date: August 26, 1986 (MWFF)
- Running time: 8 minutes
- Country: Canada

Tables of Content is a 1986 Canadian animated short film directed by Wendy Tilby.

== Plot ==
Made as her graduating class project in the filmmaking program at Emily Carr College of Art and Design, the film depicts an elderly man dining alone in a restaurant and observing the sights and sounds around him.

== Release ==
The film premiered at the 1986 Montreal World Film Festival. It was subsequently acquired for distribution by the National Film Board of Canada.

== Awards ==
At Montreal, it won the award for Best Short Film. It was later screened at the Yorkton Film Festival, where it won the Golden Sheaf award for Best Animation.

The film was a Genie Award nominee for Best Animated Short at the 8th Genie Awards in 1987, and was one of five films selected for the Academy of Canadian Cinema and Television's independent short films showcase, a program that gave the winning films commercial screenings in various Canadian markets.

It was submitted for the Academy Award for Best Animated Short Film at the 59th Academy Awards, but was not a finalist.
