= Dream Tracks =

1986 Canadian documentary film

- French: Les Traces du rêve
- Directed by: Jean-Daniel Lafond
- Written by: Jean-Daniel Lafond
- Produced by: Jacques Vallée
- Starring: Pierre Perrault
- Cinematography: François Beauchemin; Martin Leclerc; Michel Naud
- Edited by: Babalou Hamelin
- Music by: Pierre Perrault
- Production company: National Film Board of Canada
- Release date: 1986
- Running time: 96 minutes
- Country: Canada
- Language: French

Dream Tracks (French: Les Traces du rêve) is a Canadian documentary film, directed by Jean-Daniel Lafond and released in 1986. The film is a portrait of the life and work of Quebec filmmaker Pierre Perrault.

Reviewing the film for Cinema Canada, Marika Csano wrote that "It would have been easy for Lafond to be content with a static heroic tableau of Pierre Perrault hunting images. What makes Les Traces du reve interesting is that we watch Perrault evolve from beginning to end. Perhaps Lafond was aware that from the idealized opening portrait, Perrault increasingly becomes a vulnerable human being. Pierre Perrault is led to participate in his own analysis, questioning himself and his work. The conclusion is nostalgic, and has the feel of a despairing testament."

The film received a Genie Award nomination for Best Feature Length Documentary at the 8th Genie Awards in 1987.
