= Ranch: The Alan Wood Ranch Project =

1985 Canadian documentary film

- Directed by: Steven DeNure; Chris Lowry
- Produced by: Steven DeNure; Chris Lowry
- Starring: Alan Wood
- Distributed by: Canadian Filmmakers Distribution Centre
- Release date: 1985
- Running time: 28 minutes
- Country: Canada
- Language: English

Ranch: The Alan Wood Ranch Project is a Canadian documentary film, directed by Steven DeNure and Chris Lowry and released in 1985. The film profiles Vancouver artist Alan Wood, and his 1983 art project of building a 320-acre replica ranch in Alberta.

The film premiered in October 1985 at the Chicago International Film Festival, and had its Canadian premiere in November at the Art Gallery of Ontario's Jackman Hall.

The film received a Genie Award nomination for Best Feature Length Documentary at the 8th Genie Awards in 1987.
