= Lost! (film) =

- VHS cover
- Directed by: Peter Rowe
- Written by: Peter Rowe
- Based on: Lost! by Thomas Thompson
- Produced by: Peter Rowe
- Starring: Kenneth Welsh; Helen Shaver; Michael Hogan
- Cinematography: Donald Wilder
- Edited by: Christopher Hutton
- Music by: Micky Erbe; Allan Kane; Maribeth Solomon
- Production company: Victor Solnicki Productions
- Release date: 1986
- Running time: 95 minutes
- Country: Canada
- Language: English

Lost! is a Canadian drama film, directed by Peter Rowe and released in 1986. Based on the book of the same name by Thomas Thompson, the film centres on three survivors of a shipwreck, two brothers and one of their wives, whose chances of survival are threatened by the more religious brother's conviction that they must trust in God to save them rather than making any effort of their own. The film stars Kenneth Welsh as Jim, Michael Hogan as Bob, and Helen Shaver as Linda.

The water scenes were shot on Lake Ontario, while interior sequences were filmed in the gymnasium of Franklin Horner Middle School in Etobicoke.

The film had a brief theatrical run in 1986 for Genie Award qualification, but was distributed primarily as a CBC Television film. It received two Genie Award nominations, for Best Actress (Shaver) and Best Adapted Screenplay (Rowe), at the 8th Genie Awards in 1987.

== Cast ==
- Kenneth Welsh as Jim
- Helen Shaver as Linda
- Michael Hogan as Bob
- Linda Goranson as Wilma
- Charles Jolliffe as Nick (credited as Charles Joliffe)
- Stuart Stone
