= Linda Sørensen =

Danish cricketer

Linda Sorensen
Personal information
- Full name: Linda Sorensen

International information
- National side: Denmark
- Only ODI (cap 16): 19 July 1990 v England

Career statistics
Competition	WODI
Matches	1
Runs scored	1
Batting average	0.00
100s/50s	0/0
Top score	0
Catches/stumpings	0/0
- Source: ESPNcricinfo, 27 September 2020

Linda Sorensen is a former women's cricketer for the Denmark national women's cricket team who played one ODIs during the 1990 Women's European Cricket Cup. Appearing against England, she was dismissed without scoring a run in her only batting innings, and did not bowl.
