= Every Dog's Guide to Complete Home Safety =

- Directed by: Les Drew
- Written by: Les Drew
- Produced by: Bill Pettigrew
- Starring: Paul Brown; Luba Goy; Harvey Atkin; Henry Beckman
- Music by: Eldon Rathburn
- Production company: National Film Board of Canada
- Release date: 1986
- Running time: 10 minutes
- Country: Canada
- Language: English

Every Dog's Guide to Complete Home Safety is a Canadian animated short film, directed by Les Drew for the National Film Board of Canada and released in 1986. The film's central character is Wally (Paul Brown), a dog who is frantically trying to protect his new family from their own careless actions as they prepare for a dinner party.

The film's voice cast also includes Luba Goy as Honey, Harvey Atkin as Bernard and Henry Beckman as The Boss.

It received a Genie Award nomination for Best Animated Short Film at the 8th Genie Awards in 1987.

Drew released a sequel film, Every Dog's Guide to the Playground, in 1991. Both films were broadcast in the United States on Cartoon Network's O Canada anthology series of NFB animated shorts, and were packaged together in 1996 for home video release as The Blue Dog Safety Video.
