= Louise Marleau =

Canadian actress

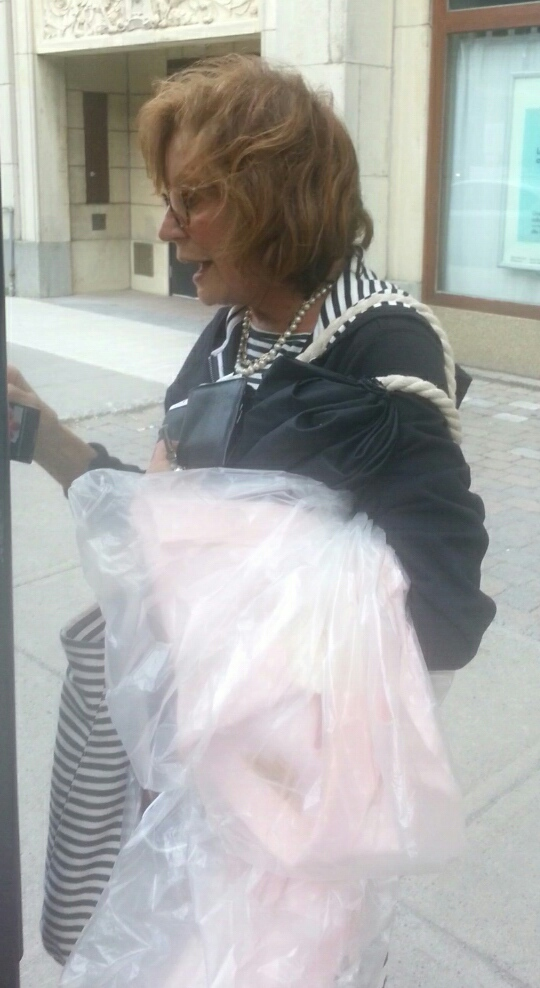
- Louise Marleau outside the Outremont theatre in 2016
- Born: August 26, 1944 (age 82); Montreal, Quebec, Canada
- Occupation: actor

Louise Marleau (born August 26, 1944) is a Canadian actress. She won the 1985 Genie Award for Best Performance by an Actress in a Leading Role for her role in A Woman in Transit (La Femme de l'hôtel) and was nominated in the same category in 1980 for her role in Heartbreak (L'Arrache-cœur), a role for which she won Best Actress at the 1979 Montreal World Film Festival.

Born in Montreal, she has been acting since she was a child, and she made her professional debut in 1962 at 18. Since that time she has worked with all the major theatrical companies in Canada, including the Stratford Festival, performing in works by Molière, Feydeau, Genet, Cocteau and Shakespeare.

Marleau recently translated Eve Ensler's play The Vagina Monologues into French (Canadian French).

== Filmography ==
- Beau temps, mauvais temps – 1955
- The Adolescents (La Fleur de l'âge, ou Les adolescentes) – 1964
- YUL 871 – 1966
- Au retour des oies blanches – 1971
- In Praise of Older Women – 1978
- Heartbreak (L'Arrache-cœur) – 1979
- Alexandre – 1980
- Contamination – 1980
- Good Riddance (Les Bons débarras) – 1980
- A Woman in Transit (La Femme de l'hôtel) – 1984
- Anne Trister – 1986
- Exit – 1986
- Straight for the Heart (À corps perdu) – 1988
- Cruising Bar – 1989
- Le grand secret – 1989
- An Imaginary Tale (Une histoire inventée) – 1990
- The Mirage – 1992
- The Dance Goes On – 1992
- The Countess of Baton Rouge – 1998
- External Affairs – 1999
- Le Pays dans la gorge – 2000
- Canada: A People's History – 2000
- Fortier – 2001
- The Baroness and the Pig – 2002
- Bunker, le cirque – 2002
