= Jacques Godin =

Canadian film, television and stage actor (1930–2020)

Jacques Godin CQ
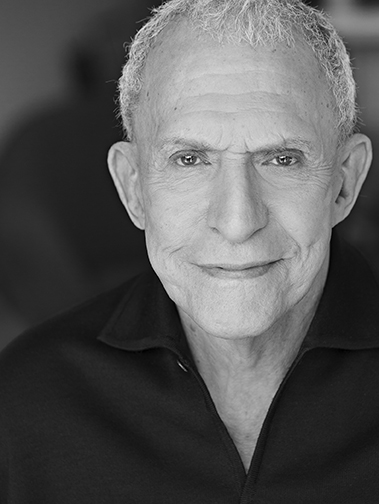
- Godin in 2017
- Born: September 14, 1930; Montreal, Quebec, Canada
- Died: October 26, 2020 (aged 90); Montreal, Quebec, Canada
- Occupation: Actor
- Awards: Canadian Film Award (1973)

Jacques Godin (French pronunciation: [ʒak godɛ̃]; 14 September 1930 – 26 October 2020) was a Canadian film, television and stage actor. He was born in Montreal, Quebec.

== Career ==
He won the Canadian Film Award for Best Actor at the 25th Canadian Film Awards in 1973 for his role in the film O.K. ... Laliberté, and was a nominee in the same category at the 13th Genie Awards in 1992 for Being at Home with Claude. In June 2017, Godin was made a knight in the Ordre national du Québec.

Godin died on 26 October 2020 of heart failure in Hôpital de Verdun in Montreal, aged 90.

== Filmography ==
- 1954 : 14, rue de Galais (TV series) : Ménard, Lionel
- 1955 : Cap-aux-sorciers (TV series) : Un marin
- 1956 : Le Retour
- 1957 : Radisson (TV series) : Pierre Esprit Radisson
- 1958 : Le Courrier du roy (TV series) : Longshot
- 1962 : Les Enquêtes Jobidon (TV series)
- 1963 : Ti-Jean caribou (TV series)
- 1964 : The Luck of Ginger Coffey : Policeman
- 1965 : Septième nord (TV series) : Dr. Albert Quesnel
- 1965 : Mission of Fear (Astataïon ou Le festin des morts)
- 1965 : Pas de vacances pour les idoles : Gangster
- 1966 : Treasure Island ("Schatzinsel, Die") (feuilleton TV) : Israël Hands
- 1968 : Les Martin (TV series) : Eloi Martin
- 1970 : Mont-Joye (TV series) : Eudore Meunier
- 1970 : Le Gardien (TV)
- 1971 : Des souris et des hommes (TV) : Lennie Small
- 1972 : In the Name of the Son (Et du fils) : Noël Boisjoli
- 1973 : Mademoiselle Julie
- 1973 : La Dernière neige
- 1973 : The Pyx (La Lunule): Superintendent
- 1973 : O.K. ... Laliberté : Paul Laliberté
- 1974 : By the Blood of Others (Par le sang des autres) : Francis
- 1976 : The Man Inside (TV) : Cross
- 1977 : One Man : Jaworski
- 1979 : An Adventure for Two (À nous deux) : Le commandant Strauss
- 1980 : Belle et Sébastien (TV series) : voix de Jonathan
- 1980 : Aéroport: Jeux du hasard (TV) : David
- 1981 : Yesterday : Mr. Daneault
- 1981 : The Amateur: Argus
- 1982 : Beyond Forty (La Quarantaine) : Tarzan
- 1984 : Un amour de quartier (TV series) : Lucien Larivière
- 1984 : Mario : Father
- 1986 : Henri : Joseph
- 1986 : Equinox (Équinoxe)
- 1986 : Intimate Power (Pouvoir intime) : Théo
- 1988 : Gaspard and Son (Gaspard et fil$)
- 1989 : Salut Victor : Victor Laprade
- 1990 : Frontière du crime (Double Identity) (TV) : Wayne
- 1991 : Alisée : Georges-Étienne
- 1992 : Montréal P.Q. (TV series) : Victor Téoli
- 1992 : Being at Home with Claude : Inspector
- 1993 : La charge de l'orignal épormyable : Mycroft Mixeudeim
- 1993 : Maria des Eaux-Vives (feuilleton TV) : Frédéric
- 1996 : Jasmine (TV series) : Damien Rocheleau
- 1996 : Innocence (feuilleton TV)
- 1996 : Night of the Flood (La nuit du déluge) : The Father
- 1997 : Sous le signe du lion (TV series) : Jérémie Martin
- 1997 : Lobby (TV series)
- 1997 : The Caretaker's Lodge (La Conciergerie) : Thomas Colin
- 2000 : Chartrand et Simonne (TV series) : Père Abbé
- 2000 : Monsieur, monsieur : Monsieur #1
- 2001 : Si la tendance se maintient (TV series) : Robert Sirois
- 2003 : Grande Ourse (TV series) : Dr. Mondoux
- 2003 : Red Nose (Nez rouge) : Juge Godbout
- 2004 : The Last Casino (TV) : Saunders
- 2005 : Hunt for Justice (TV) : General Léveillée
- 2009 : The Legacy (La Donation) : Dr Yves Rainville
- 2009 : Une belle mort : Le père (post-production)
- 2010 : The Last Escape (La dernière fugue) : La Père
- 2010 : Day Before Yesterday : The Senior Detective
- 2014-2015 : Mémoires vives (TV series) : Ŕeal Pinard
