= Matthew Fraser (journalist) =

Canadian academic, author and journalist

Matthew William Fraser
- Born: July 3, 1958 (age 68); Toronto, Ontario, Canada
- Occupations: Academic, Author, Journalist
- Writing career
- Genre: Media
- Notable works: Weapons of Mass Distraction, Throwing Sheep In The Boardroom

Matthew William Fraser (born July 3, 1958) is a British-Canadian academic, author and journalist.

== Biography ==
Born in Toronto to British parents, Fraser was educated at the University of Toronto (Victoria College), Ryerson University (now Toronto Metropolitan University), Carleton University, London School of Economics, Nuffield College, Oxford, University of Paris I: Panthéon-Sorbonne, and the Institut d'Etudes Politiques de Paris, where he earned a doctorate in political science.

He began his journalism career at The Globe and Mail in the 1980s, and subsequently wrote a weekly column for the Montreal Gazette from Paris and London. In the 1990s, he became a policy adviser and consultant in Ottawa, where he worked mainly on broadcasting and media issues for the Liberal government. In 1997, he joined the faculty of Ryerson University as a professor of media.

In 1998 when media magnate Conrad Black launched the National Post, Fraser joined the paper as a columnist while briefly retaining his academic position at Ryerson. In 2002–03, he co-hosted a weekly CBC Newsworld television show, Inside Media, with Toronto Star columnist Antonia Zerbisias. From 2003 to 2005, he was Editor-in-Chief of the National Post.

He is a professor at the American University of Paris and taught at the Institut d'Etudes Politiques de Paris. He has also lectured at the Université de Paris IV (Sorbonne), Panthéon-Assas University, and Université de Paris-Dauphine.

== Selected works ==
- Quebec Inc. (1987)
- Free-for-All: The Struggle for Dominance on the Digital Frontier (1999)
- Weapons of Mass Distraction: Soft Power and American Empire (2003)
- Throwing Sheep in the Boardroom (2009)
- In Truth: A History of Lies from Ancient Rome to Modern America (2020)
- Monumental Fury: The History of Iconoclasm and the Future of Our Past (2022)
