= Nion in the Kabaret de La Vita =

Canadian experimental short film directed by Jeremy Podeswa

- Directed by: Jeremy Podeswa
- Produced by: Jeremy Podeswa; Camelia Frieberg
- Starring: Ian "Nion" Wallace
- Cinematography: Peter Mettler
- Release date: 1986
- Running time: 28 min.
- Country: Canada
- Language: English

Nion in the Kabaret de La Vita is a Canadian experimental short film, directed by Jeremy Podeswa and released in 1986.

Based on Commedia Bizarro, a stage show by performance artist Ian Wallace in his Nion character, the film depicts Nion as an alien who lands on Earth and undergoes a series of magical journeys which teach him about the human condition. Writing for The Globe and Mail, Salem Alaton opined that "you can only wonder what Laurie Anderson's static, stagy Home of the Brave might have looked like had Jeremy Podeswa been hired to direct it."

The film was a shortlisted Genie Award finalist for Best Live Action Short Drama at the 8th Genie Awards.
