= Pol Pelletier =

Canadian actress and writer (born 1947)

- Born: Nicole Pelletier; November 6, 1947 (age 78); Ottawa, Ontario, Canada

Pol Pelletier (born Nicole Pelletier, November 6, 1947) is a Canadian actor, director, and playwright. Pelletier is an influential figure in experimental and feminist theatre in Quebec.

== Early life and education ==
Nicole Pelletier was born on November 6, 1947, in Ottawa, Ontario, Canada. She is the elder sister of Francine Pelletier. She studied French literature at the University of Ottawa.

== Career ==
Pelletier co-founded the Théâtre Expérimental de Montréal (TEM) in 1975 with Jean-Pierre Ronfard and Robert Gravel, and the Théâtre Expérimental des Femmes (TEF) with Louise Laprade and Nicole Lecavalier in 1979. She resigned from TEF in 1985. In 1988, she founded DOJO, later depicted in Stéphane Leclair's 2001 documentary, Histoire d'un DOJO.

== Works ==
=== Plays ===
- La Nef des sorcières (collective creation, 1976)
- A ma mère, à ma mère, à ma voisine (collective creation – TEM)
- La Lumière blanche
- La Trilogies des histoires
  - Joie (1992)
  - Océan (1996)
  - Or (1997)
- Cérémonie d’Adieu (1999)
- Nicole, c'est moi

== Personal life ==
She lived in France from 2005 to 2008.
