= Guy Dufaux =

French-born Canadian cinematographer

Guy Dufaux (French pronunciation: [gi dyfo]; born July 18, 1943, in Lille, France) is a French-born Canadian cinematographer. The majority of his works have been in Canadian cinema; he immigrated to Canada in 1965 and became a Canadian citizen in 1971. He is also the father of Montréal-based sculptor Pascal Dufaux and the brother of the late Canadian documentary filmmaker, Georges Dufaux.

== Recognition ==
- 2006 Montreal World Film Festival Best Artistic Contribution - The Chinese Botanist's Daughters - Won
- 2002 Jutra Award for Best Cinematography (Meilleure Direction de la Photographie) - Tar Angel - Nominated
- 2002 Canadian Society of Cinematographers - Kodak New Century Award
- 2001 Genie Award for Best Achievement in Cinematography - Stardom - Nominated
- 2001 Gemini Award for Best Photography in a Dramatic Program or Series - Haven - Won
- 2000 Jutra Award for Best Cinematography (Meilleure Photographie) - The Eleventh Child - Nominated
- 1996 Genie Award for Best Achievement in Cinematography - Polygraph (Le Polygraphe) - Nominated
- 1992 Genie Award for Best Achievement in Cinematography - Léolo - Nominated
- 1991 Genie Award for Best Achievement in Cinematography - Moody Beach - Nominated
- 1991 Genie Award for Best Achievement in Cinematography - Nelligan - Nominated
- 1990 Genie Award for Best Achievement in Cinematography - Jesus of Montreal - Won
- 1988 Genie Award for Best Achievement in Cinematography - Night Zoo - Won
- 1987 Genie Award for Best Achievement in Cinematography - Equinox (Équinoxe) - Nominated
