= Loyalties (1986 film) =

- Movie poster
- Directed by: Anne Wheeler
- Written by: Sharon Riis; Anne Wheeler
- Produced by: William Johnston; Ronald Lillie
- Starring: Kenneth Welsh; Tantoo Cardinal; Susan Wooldridge
- Cinematography: Vic Sarin
- Edited by: Judy Krupanszky
- Music by: Michael Conway Baker
- Production company: Lauron International
- Distributed by: Norstar Releasing; Cinema Group
- Release date: 1986
- Running time: 98 minutes
- Countries: Canada; United Kingdom
- Language: English

Loyalties (also known as Double allégeance) is a 1986 British/Canadian drama film written and directed by Anne Wheeler. It was shot from July 8 to August 9, 1985 in Lac La Biche, Alberta and cost $2.5 million.

The film was first shown on May 12 at the 1986 Cannes Film Market.

== Plot ==
Loyalties is a story about the relationships between an upper-class Englishwoman, her husband and their housekeeper. The film begins with a violent struggle, overlooked by a young boy and then cuts to a small plane preparing to land in Lac La Biche, Alberta, Canada. Lily Sutton tells the pilot of the plane that she and her three children are on their way to join her husband, David, who works as a doctor in the town, after emigrating from England. David appears happy to see his wife and children.

A young waitress working in a bar, Rosanne Ladouceur, is assaulted by one of the patrons, later revealed to be her boyfriend, Eddy. Doctor Sutton attends to Rosanne after the fight. Later when Lily and David are alone, David asks if she told anyone the reason for them moving to Canada, she replies that she did not. Doctor Sutton, continues to attend to Rosanne's injuries after the fight, removing the stitches he gave her earlier. She reveals that she lost her job because of the fight. Lily and the children visit David while he's working but he does not have time to spend with them. Rosanne and Eddy quarrel over the bar fight and her losing her job, he tells her he's leaving to become a firefighter.

David encounters Rosanne and her family sleeping next to a fire outside, Rosanne's sister had forgotten to pick them up and David offers them a ride home. David asks Rosanne if she would like a job helping Lily with their home and with the children, she accepts. David and Lily go to an outdoor barbeque so Lily can meet new people and make friends. It appears that David is having a better time at the party than Lily, until someone asks him more about his past and he quickly decides that they should leave. David tells Lily that he doesn’t like the other towns people, but Lily has started to warm up to them. David warns Lily not to be friends with the couple who have relatives working in Britain.

Rosanne's young son Jessie, asks her if she's going to speak with Eddy, his father, Jessie tells Rosanne that he knows Eddy has apologized. Rosanne goes to a bar with her friends, where Eddy is playing pool, he asks to speak privately with her. Eddy tells her that he quit drinking the day after he hit her. Lily and Rosanne talk about their children, Rosanne feels that Jesse resents her for sending Eddy away. Lily comments that she thinks Eddy is charming Rosanne seems sad that she still cares for Eddy, Lily comforts her.

Rosanne's family does laundry at the Sutton's, David comes home and helps with folding the girls’ underwear. Tension builds between Lily and David. During a violent thunderstorm one night David gets drunk alone outside in the rain. Rosanne apologizes to Lily for doing her laundry at Lily's, Lily tells her that she isn’t mad at Rosanne, that she's mad at David. Lily is looking forward to her eldest son coming to join them from England now that he's finished school for the year. Lily and Rosanne talk about their relationships with their mothers, Rosanne is very close with hers, Lily feels that her mother doesn’t like her very much, that their relationship isn’t genuine. Rosanne gets Lily to admit that she's having problems with her marriage rather than dodging the question like she usually does.

Rosanne sings plays the Sutton's piano, stopping when David comes home, Rosanne notes that David is home very early, he suggests the two families should have dinner together, they relax at the beach without Lily. Lily's mother tells David about her family history and how white people made them leave their family land. Lily picks up her youngest son, Robert, who does not seem happy. He tells Lily that everybody at school knows what happened and that he does not want to go back in the fall. Lily and Robert arrive while everyone is playing at the beach, David is not happy to see them.

Lily is frustrated that Robert isn’t opening up to her, Rosanne tells her to give him a break and the two get into an argument. Rosanne walks out and tells Lily to forward her the money she owes her. Eddy comes home and plays with his and Rosanne's children. Lily and David have a formal dinner together, she seems unhappy and plays a somber song on the piano. Eddy suggests that the family move with him as he's gotten a good job, Rosanne seems pleased. Her and Eddy reconcile, she comments on her and Lily's similarities and on their differences. Eddy is not happy that Rosanne wants to try and get her job at the bar back, but he promises to try, if she stops putting him down. David watches Eddy and Rosanne while they’re in bed together through a window.

Lily goes to see Rosanne and apologizes for what she said and for being rude. Rosanne and her mother invite Lily and the Sutton children inside to spend time together. Rosanne also apologizes to Lily, and the two become close again. The Sutton's and Ladouceur's decide to go to the Pow Wow together. Lily tells Rosanne her that it's her birthday and that David is away on a fishing trip. Rosanne asks her oldest daughter, Leona, to babysit so that she can take Lily to the bar. Rosanne has everyone sing Lily Happy Birthday.

David comes home early from his trip and finds Rosanne's daughter watching a horror movie while the younger children are in bed. David tells Leona that he thinks she looks beautiful, that he knows she's too young to drink, but that she can have some champagne. David comes onto Leona and she runs from him into the forest. David catches her, assaults her, and threatens to kill her if she lies about what happened. Lily and Rosanne come home as David is assaulting Leona. Rosanne yells at Lily, questioning what kind of woman she is and calling her names. Later, Rosanne comes back with a gun and tries to kill David, Lily hits her with a glass and takes the gun, Rosanne runs away. The police come to Rosanne's home to inform her that Lily has accused David of assaulting Leona. Lily is not able to lay charges against David because they are married, Rosanne agrees to lay charges against David. Lily and her children go to Rosanne's where Lily tells Rosanne that she doesn’t think the police believe her, Rosanne replies that they will. Lily reveals that she has left David, Rosanne embraces her and tells her that she and the children can stay with her.

== Cast ==
- Kenneth Welsh as David Sutton
- Tantoo Cardinal as Rosanne Ladouceur
- Susan Wooldridge as Lily Sutton
- Vera Marin as Beatrice
- Diane Debassige as Leona
- Tom Jackson as Eddy
- Christopher Barrington-Leigh as Robert Sutton
- Jeffrey Smith as Nicholas Sutton
- Meredith Rimmer as Naomi Sutton
- Yolanda Cardinal as Lisa
- Dale Willier as Jesse
- Wesley Seminowich as Wayne
- Janet Wright as Audrey Sawchuk
- Don MacKay as Mike Sawchuk
- Paul Whitney as Joe Pilsudski
- Veena Sood as Sima

== Critical response ==
Writing for CineAction, Robin Wood praised the representation of female strength and autonomy in Loyalties. He commented that the film shows both Rosanne and Lily evolving into women who stand up for themselves as well as each other; they overcome "all the social barriers of class, race and upbringing" and "win through to friendship and solidarity simply because they are women".

== Awards ==
Loyalties won three awards and was nominated for another seven. Anne Wheeler won the AMPIA Award for Best Director, and the Grand Prix Award at the Créteil International Women's Film Festival.

The film received eight Genie Award nominations at the 8th Genie Awards in 1987, for Best Picture, Best Actor (Welsh), Best Actress (Cardinal), Best Supporting Actor (Jackson), Best Director (Wheeler), Best Original Screenplay (Sharon Riis), Best Costume Design (Wendy Partridge) and Best Sound Editing (Sharon Lackie, Peter McBurnie and Peter Thilaye). Partridge won the award for Best Costume Design.
