= Michel Proulx =

Canadian art director

Michel Proulx (born 1946 in Montreal) is a Genie Award winning production designer and art director. He earned a Genie Award for Best Achievement in Art Direction/Production Design for The Rocket. He was previously nominated five times for Genie Awards, among other nominations.
