= Robert Gravel =

Canadian actor, dramatist, theatrical director and teacher

Robert Gravel (14 September 1944 – 12 August 1996) was an actor, dramatist, theatrical director and teacher.

== Career ==
Gravel was born in Montreal. He was an influential figure in the modern history of theatre in Quebec. In the middle of the 1970s, Gravel, Jean-Pierre Ronfard and Pol Pelletier co-founded the Théâtre Expérimental de Montréal (TEM). Later ideological conflicts led to the foundation of the Nouveau Théâtre Expérimental.

In 1977, Gravel co-founded with Yvon Leduc the highly successful Ligue Nationale d'Improvisation. He died in Saint-Gabriel-de-Brandon in 1996 and was entombed at the Notre Dame des Neiges Cemetery in Montreal.

In 2012, his life and work were profiled in Jean-Claude Coulbois's documentary film Mort subite d'un homme-théâtre.
