= Anne Trister =

1986 film

- Directed by: Léa Pool
- Written by: Marcel Beaulieu; Léa Pool
- Produced by: Roger Frappier; Claude Bonin
- Starring: Albane Guilhe; Louise Marleau; Lucie Laurier; Guy Thauvette
- Cinematography: Pierre Mignot
- Edited by: Michel Arcand
- Music by: René Dupéré
- Production companies: Les Films Vision 4 National Film Board of Canada
- Distributed by: Ciné 360
- Release date: 3 February 1986
- Running time: 103 minutes
- Country: Canada
- Language: French
- Budget: C$1.38 million

Anne Trister is a 1986 Canadian drama film directed by Léa Pool, and written by Pool and Marcel Beaulieu. Starring Albane Guilhe, Louise Marleau and Lucie Laurier, the film follows a Swiss Jewish artist who leaves for Quebec after her father’s death. It won the Genie Award for Best Cinematography and was screened in competition at the 36th Berlin International Film Festival.

== Synopsis ==
Anne Trister is a Swiss Jewish artist grieving the death of her father. She stops her studies and travels from Switzerland to Quebec, where she visits her friend Alix, a psychologist, and develops feelings for her. Anne also begins work on a large fresco in an unused studio.

== Cast ==
The cast includes:

- Albane Guilhe as Anne
- Louise Marleau as Alix
- Lucie Laurier as Sarah
- Guy Thauvette as Thomas
- Hugues Quester as Pierre
- Nüvit Özdogru as Simon
- Kim Yaroshevskaya as the mother

== Production ==
The film was written by Marcel Beaulieu and Léa Pool, based on an original idea by Pool. It was produced by Films Vision 4 and the National Film Board of Canada, with an approximate budget of C$1.38 million. Filming took place from 18 March to 3 June 1985 in Montreal, Lausanne, Geneva and Tel Aviv.

== Release ==
The film premiered on 3 February 1986, in Quebec, and was screened in competition at the 36th Berlin International Film Festival.

== Critical response ==
Ron Base of the Toronto Star wrote that the film "is as pristine and as empty as a modern art gallery at midnight" and called it a film "about emotion, empty of emotion". He concluded that although Anne Trister had "moments of beauty and emotion", much of it returned to "a studied, almost smug self-consciousness", and that its exploration was unsuccessful.

Noel Taylor of the Ottawa Citizen wrote that "there's no denying Anne Trister is technically an accomplished work, but its skill is more clinical than visceral. It excites admiration for Pool, the film-maker, without arousing much interest in Pool, the person. I would have liked to discover more."

For the Montreal Gazette, Bruce Bailey wrote that "while Pool's talent for spareness and subtlety is carried over from that film to Anne Trister, this latest effort suffers to at least some extent from slow pacing and an arty pretentiousness that is at times almost laughable."

Filmdienst described the film as a sensitive and thematically rich study of the search for identity and new meaning in life, while noting reservations about its combination of realistic and metaphorical scenes.

== Awards and nominations ==
Award	Year	Category	Recipients	Result	Ref.
International Women’s Film Festival, Créteil	1986	Audience Award	Anne Trister	Won	
Genie Awards	1987	Best Supporting Actress	Lucie Laurier	Nominated	
Genie Awards	1987	Best Cinematography	Pierre Mignot	Won	
Genie Awards	1987	Best Original Song	Danielle Messia, "De la main gauche" The song was named the original winner of the award, but it was subsequently rescinded after the academy discovered that it had not been written for the film.	Disqualified	
Paris Lesbian and Feminist Film Festival	1992	Best Feature Film		Won	

== See also ==
- List of LGBT-related films directed by women
