= Philip Hoffman (filmmaker) =

Canadian filmmaker, educator (born 1955)

- Born: December 10, 1955 (age 70); Kitchener, Ontario, Canada
- Occupations: Filmmaker; educator
- Awards: Governor General's Awards in Visual and Media Arts (2016)

Philip Hoffman (born December 10, 1955) is a Canadian experimental filmmaker and a member of the faculty of York University.

== Life and career ==
Hoffman was born December 10, 1955, in Kitchener, Ontario, but lived in Waterloo, Ontario during his childhood and most of his teen years. He studied at Sheridan College, where he received a diploma in media arts in 1979, and Wilfrid Laurier University, where he received a B.A. in English literature in 1987. While a student at Sheridan College he became associated with a group of filmmakers known as the Escarpment School, other members of which included Richard Kerr and Mike Hoolboom.

In 1986 he became an instructor at Sheridan College. In 1994, he started operating a summer film workshop, the Film Farm Retreat, at Mount Forest, Ontario, initially with support from Sheridan College. In 1999 he joined the York University Film and Video Department as a faculty member. He also has been a visiting professor at the University of Helsinki and University of South Florida.

Hoffman has been described as "filmmaker of memory and association" whose "highly personal" work blends fiction and documentary and "contests the claim to the truth" that characterizes conventional documentary film. As Martha Rosler maintains Hoffman's work "provides a bridge to the classical themes of death, diaspora, memory, and finally, transcendence. Of Hoffman's 1988 film "passing through/torn formations, Stan Brakhage said the film "accomplishes a multi-faceted experience for the viewer—it is a poetic document of Family, for instance—but Philip Hoffman's editing throughout is true to thought process, tracks visual theme as the mind tracks shape, makes melody of noise and words as the mind recalls sound."

Hoffman has been honoured with more than 25 retrospectives and spotlights of his work. His 2001 film, 'What these ashes wanted', received the Golden Gate Award at the San Francisco International Film Festival, the Telefilm Canada Award at the Images Festival in Toronto, and the Gus Van Sant Award at the Ann Arbor Film Festival.

In 2001 the publication Landscape with Shipwreck: First Person Cinema and the Films of Philip Hoffman, was released comprising some 25 essays. The Canadian Film Institute presented a retrospective showing of his works in Ottawa in March and April 2008. A book, entitled Rivers of Time and consisting of an interview with Hoffman, "essays and reflections" on the filmmaker and his work, and images from his films, was issued to coincide with the retrospective.

Since 1994 Hoffman has been the artistic director of the Independent Imaging Retreat (aka Film Farm) which is celebrated its 25th anniversary in 2019. with screenings and an installation at Toronto's TIFF Bell Lightbox.

In 2016, Hoffman was awarded a Governor General's Award in Visual and Media Arts as denoted in the Record (Waterloo Region), and in 2019 Hoffman's film `vulture', which utilized `green' film developing techniques (partly processed using plants and flowers) was awarded the Kodak Cinematic Award from the Ann Arbor Film Festival, USA and the Fugas Jury Award for Best International Film (over 45 minutes), at Documenta Madrid in Spain in 2020. Further explorations of botanical processes can be seen in `Deep 1', 2023, which won the Jury Award at Ann Arbor Film Festival in the USA and `endings', 2024, co-directed with Isiah Medina, which was awarded Best Director at Ribalta Film Festival in Italy.

== Works ==
- On the Pond, 1978 (director, editor and co-cinematographer)
- The Road Ended at the Beach, 1983 (director; writer; cinematographer; editor; producer)
- Somewhere Between Jalostotitlan and Encarnacion, 1984 (director; cinematographer; editor; producer); 6 minutes. A "cinematic travelogue" set in Mexico, Toronto and Colorado.
- ?O, Zoo!: The Making of a Fiction Film, 1986 (director; cinematographer; editor; producer) 23 minutes. A "subversive engagement with documentary convention" centered on the production of Peter Greenaway's film A Zed & Two Noughts.
- passing through/torn formations, 1988 (director; cinematographer; editor; producer); 43 minutes.
- river, 1979–1989 (director; cinematographer; editor; producer), 15 minutes.
- Kitchener-Berlin, 1990 (director; cinematographer; editor; producer); 34 minutes. Portrays the Canadian and German cities named in the title as "united in repressed history and the question of home"; includes home movies, archival film and television footage.
- Opening Series 1, 1992 (director;), 10 minutes.
- Opening Series 2, 1993 (director)
- Technilogic Ordering, 1994 (director; editor; producer), 30 minutes. A composite of television footage of the Gulf War.
- Opening Series 3, 1995 (director; cinematographer; editor)
- Sweep, 1995 (co-director with Sami van Ingen)
- Chimera, 1996 (director; cinematographer; editor; producer), 15 minutes. An "experimental travelogue" consisting of material from London, Helsinki, Egypt, Leningrad, Uluru and Sydney.
- Destroying Angel, 1998 (co-director, co-writer, co-cinematographer and co-editor with Wayne Salazar), 32 minutes. The film celebrates co-director's Salazar's gay marriage in the face of his continuing battles with AIDS, but is punctuated by Hoffman's being called away to the bedside of his long-time companion Marian McMahon, who was dying from cancer.
- Kokoro Is for Heart, 1999 (director; co-writer; cinematographer; editor), 7 minutes.
- Opening Series 4, 2000 (director)
- What These Ashes Wanted, 2001 (director; cinematographer; editor; producer), 55 minutes. An exploration of Hoffman's relationship with McMahon and its sudden ending with her death. The Canadian Film Encyclopedia quotes Hoffman as saying that he wanted the film "to illuminate the conditions of her death… the mystery of her life and the reason why, at the instant of her passage, I felt peace with her leaving… a feeling I no longer hold."
- All Fall Down, 2009 (director; co-writer with Janine Marchessault; cinematographer; editor; producer) 135 minutes.
- ever present going past 2007 (director; cinematographer; editor; producer) 7 minutes. A "cine-poem" connecting gardens, films and poems.
- Slaughterhouse, 2014 (director; cinematographer; editor; producer) 15 minutes.
- Aged, 2014 (director; cinematographer; editor; producer), 45 minutes.
- By the Time We Got to Expo, 2015 (co-director with Eva Kolzce) 9 minutes.
- vulture, 2019 (director; cinematographer; editor; producer), 57 minutes.
- ending series, 2020 to 2024 (co-director with Isiah Medina), various lengths.
- Flowers #3 (Kissed by the Sun), 2023 (director), 10 minutes.
- Deep 1, 2023 (director; cinematographer; editor; producer), 15 minutes.

== Other works ==
- Dogs Have Tales, 1979 (actor)
- Freeze-up, 1979 (director; co-writer; cinematographer; editor)
- Krieghoff, 1980 (cinematographer)
- Megan Carey, 1981 (cinematographer)
- On Land Over Water, 1984 (co-cinematographer)
- Prologue: Infinite Obscure (Narratives of Egypt series), 1984 (cinematographer)
- Choral Fantasy, 1986 (cinematographer)
- From Home, 1988 (co-cinematographer)
- Svetlana, 1988 (co-cinematographer)
