= Yves Simoneau =

Canadian film and television director (born 1955)

- Born: October 28, 1955 (age 70); Quebec City, Quebec, Canada
- Occupations: Film director Film producer
- Years active: 1979-present

Yves Simoneau (French pronunciation: [iv simɔno]; born October 28, 1955) is a Canadian film and television director.

Simoneau was born in Quebec City, Quebec.

== Recognition ==
His acclaimed 1986 crime drama Intimate Power (Pouvoir intime) garnered multiple Genie Awards nominations including best direction at the 8th Genie Awards. His 1987 film Les fous de bassan was entered into the 37th Berlin International Film Festival.

In 2007 he directed the Movie Bury My Heart at Wounded Knee. It received 17 Emmy Award nominations, the most of any show at The 59th Emmy Awards held in September 2007. It went on to win five awards including the Emmy for Outstanding Made For Television Movie.

== Filmography ==
=== Features ===
- Les tailleurs de pierre - 1978, short film
- Commission d'enquête - 1978, short film
- Québec on the Sunny Side - 1978, short film
- Les célébrations - 1979
- Dernier voyage - 1980, short film
- Bonjour le Québec - 1980, documentary short
- Le phénomène des guérisseurs au Québec - 1980, documentary short
- L'enquête - 1980, short film
- Le génie de l'instant - 1982, short film
- Red Eyes (Les yeux rouges) - 1982
- Pourquoi l'étrange Monsieur Zolock s'intéressait-il tant à la bande dessinée? - 1983, documentary
- Trouble - 1985, short film
- Intimate Power (Pouvoir intime) - 1986
- In the Shadow of the Wind (Les fous de bassan) - 1987
- In the Belly of the Dragon (Dans le ventre du dragon) - 1989
- Perfectly Normal - 1990
- Mother's Boys - 1993
- Free Money - 1998
- Ignition - 2001
- The Bait (L'appât) - 2010

=== Television ===
- Memphis (TV movie, 1992)
- Till Death Do Us Part (TV movie, 1992)
- Cruel Doubt (TV movie, 1992)
- Amelia Earhart: The Final Flight (TV movie, 1994)
- Dead Man's Walk (TV miniseries, 1996)
- Intensity (TV movie, 1997)
- 36 Hours to Die (TV movie, 1999)
- Nuremberg (TV miniseries, 2000)
- Night Visions (TV series, 2001)
- Napoléon (TV miniseries, 2002)
- 44 Minutes: The North Hollywood Shoot-Out (TV movie, 2003)
- The 4400 (TV series, 2004)
- Marie-Antoinette (TV movie, 2006)
- Ruffian (TV movie, 2007)
- Bury My Heart at Wounded Knee (TV movie, 2007)
- V (TV series, 2009)
- America (TV movie, 2009)
- Assassin's Creed: Lineage (TV miniseries, 2009)
- Matadors (TV movie, 2010)
- Partners (TV movie, 2011)
- Beauty and the Beast (TV movie, 2012)
- Betty & Coretta (TV movie, 2013)
- Horizon (TV movie, 2013)
- The Brave (TV series, 2017)
- The Lost Wife of Robert Durst (TV movie, 2018)
