= Air Transat Flight 236 =

2001 aviation accident in Portugal

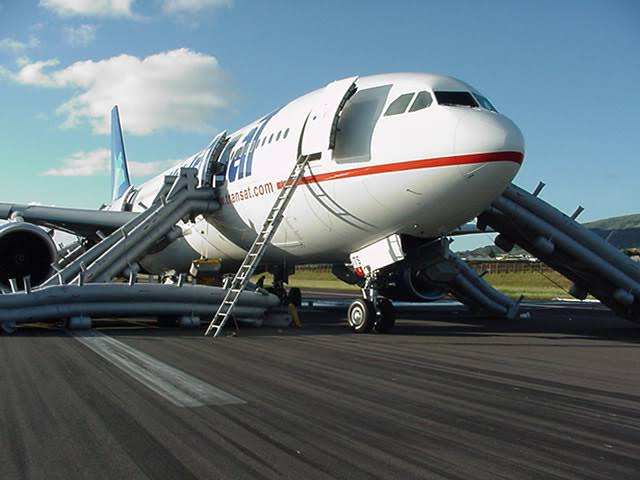
- The aircraft after the emergency landing

Accident
- Date: 24 August 2001
- Summary: Fuel exhaustion due to fuel leak and pilot error
- Site: Lajes Airport/Air Force Base, Terceira Island, Azores, Portugal; 38°45′43″N 027°05′27″W

Aircraft
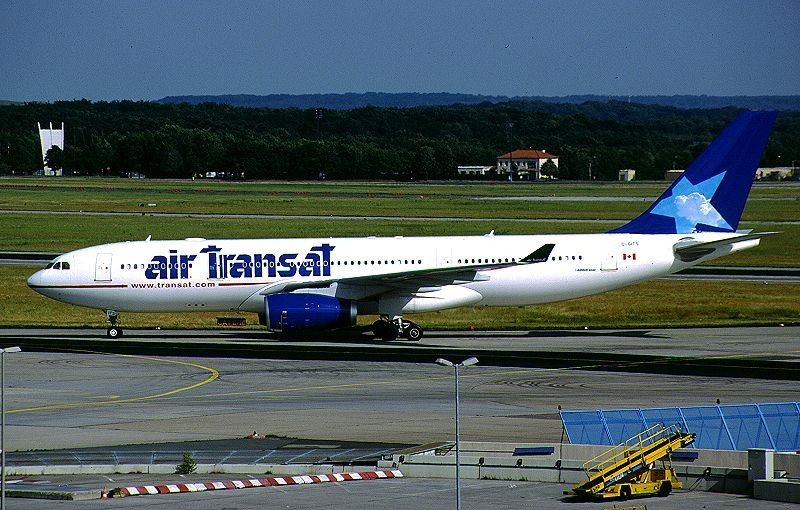
- C-GITS, the aircraft involved in the accident, seen in 1999
- Aircraft type: Airbus A330-243
- Operator: Air Transat
- IATA flight No.: TS236
- ICAO flight No.: TSC236
- Call sign: TRANSAT 236
- Registration: C-GITS
- Flight origin: Toronto Pearson International Airport, Toronto, Ontario, Canada
- Destination: Portela Airport, Lisbon, Portugal
- Occupants: 306
- Passengers: 293
- Crew: 13
- Fatalities: 0
- Injuries: 18
- Survivors: 306

Air Transat Flight 236 was a transatlantic flight bound for Lisbon, Portugal, from Toronto, Canada, that lost all engine power while flying over the Atlantic Ocean in the dark on August 24, 2001. The Airbus A330 ran out of fuel because of a fuel leak caused by improper maintenance. Captain Robert Piché, 48, and First Officer Dirk DeJager, 28, glided the plane to a successful emergency landing in the Azores, saving the lives of all 306 people (293 passengers and 13 crew) on board. This was also the longest passenger aircraft glide without engines, gliding for nearly 65 nautical miles (120 km; 75 mi). Following this unusual aviation accident, this aircraft was nicknamed the "Azores Glider".

== Aircraft ==
The aircraft involved was an Airbus A330-243 registered as C-GITS. The aircraft was just over two years old and was equipped with two Rolls-Royce Trent 772B-60 engines.

== Accident ==
Flight 236 took off from Toronto at 00:52 (UTC) on Friday, August 24, 2001 (local time: 20:52 (ET) on Thursday, August 23), bound for Lisbon, Portugal, with 293 passengers and 13 crew on board. The flight was flown by Captain Robert Piché, who had 16,800 hours of flight experience (with 796 of them on the Airbus A330), and First Officer Dirk DeJager, who had 4,800 flight hours (including 386 hours on the Airbus A330).

The aircraft was a two-year-old Airbus A330-243 registered as C-GITS that had first flown on March 17, 1999, configured with 362 seats and placed in service by Air Transat on April 28, 1999.

It was powered by two Rolls-Royce Trent 772B-60 engines each capable of delivering 316 kN (71,100 lbf) thrust. Leaving the gate in Toronto, the aircraft had 46.9 tonnes (103,000 lb) of fuel on board, 4.5 tonnes (9,900 lb) more than required by regulations.

At 04:38 UTC (almost four hours into the flight), the aircraft began to leak fuel through a fracture that had developed in a fuel line to the no. 2 (right) engine downstream of the fuel/oil heat exchanger. At 05:03 UTC, more than four hours into the flight, the pilots noticed low oil temperature and high oil pressure on engine no. 2.

Although these readings were an indirect result of the fuel leak, the pilots had no reason to consider that as a cause. Consequently, Captain Piché suspected they were false warnings and shared that opinion with Air Transat maintenance control centre in Montreal, which advised them to monitor the situation.

There were other potential indications of fuel problems:

1. The fuel on board was decreasing at an unusual rate which was displayed in the Fuel-On-Board (FOB) quantity on the Engine Warning Display.
2. The estimated fuel on board at destination would have been showing as decreasing indicating reduced fuel range.
3. The full forward transfer of the fuel in the trim tank was premature given the fuel load on departure from Toronto of 46,900 kilograms (103,400 lb). A prolonged, 19-minute TRIM TANK XFR memo between 05:11 and 05:30, and then the TRIM TANK XFRD memo between 05:30 and 05:33 would have displayed this information.

At 05:36 UTC, the pilots received a warning of fuel imbalance.

Rather than referring to the appropriate checklists, the crew performed procedures from memory, and this resulted in the cross-feeding of fuel into an already leaking engine.

The transferred fuel was lost through the fractured fuel line, which was leaking at about 13 tonnes per hour (more than 3.6 kg/s). This caused a higher-than-normal fuel flow through the fuel-oil heat exchanger, which in turn led to a drop in oil temperature and a rise in oil pressure for the no. 2 engine.

Flight 236's departure, original destination, and ultimate destination

At 05:45 UTC, the pilots decided to divert to Lajes Air Base in the Azores. Initially there was a 14-degree heading deviation from their assigned heading of 230 degrees magnetic caused by the autopilot being in true heading mode. After 2 minutes Santa Maria Oceanic air traffic control radioed "Transat 236 heavy maintain 230 magnetic heading". This transmission was not acknowledged, but the aircraft turned to the correct heading. They declared a fuel emergency with Santa Maria Oceanic air traffic control three minutes after the heading was corrected.

At 06:13 UTC, while still 150 nautical miles (280 km; 170 mi) from Lajes and at 39,000 feet (12,000 m), engine no. 2 flamed out from fuel starvation. Piché then initiated a descent to 33,000 feet (10,000 m), which was the proper single-engine altitude for the weight of the plane at that time. Ten minutes later, the crew sent a mayday to Santa Maria Oceanic air traffic control.

Thirteen minutes later, at 06:26 UTC and about 65 nautical miles (120 km; 75 mi) from Lajes Air Base, engine no. 1 also flamed out, requiring the plane to glide the remaining distance. Without engine power, the plane lost its primary source of electrical power. The emergency ram air turbine deployed automatically to provide essential power for critical sensors and flight instruments to fly the aircraft as well as enough hydraulic pressure to operate the primary flight controls (without which the aircraft would be uncontrollable).

The aircraft lost hydraulic power for the flaps, alternate brakes, and spoilers. The slats would still be powered, while the primary brakes would be able to operate a limited number of times using pressure stored in the brake accumulator. With neither engine running, there was no source of bleed air to maintain cabin pressurization. Five minutes later, at 06:31 UTC, the oxygen masks dropped down in the passenger cabin.

Military air traffic controllers guided the aircraft to the airport with their radar system. The descent rate of the plane was about 2,000 ft/min (610 m/min). They calculated they had about 15 to 20 minutes left before they would be forced to ditch in the ocean. The air base was sighted a few minutes later. Piché executed one 360° turn, and then a series of "S" turns, to dissipate excess altitude.

At 06:45 UTC, the plane touched down hard, around 310 m (1,030 ft) past the threshold of runway 33, at a speed around 200 knots (370 km/h; 230 mph), bounced once, and then touched down again, roughly 850 m (2,800 ft) from the threshold. Maximum emergency braking was applied and retained, and the plane came to a stop after a landing run that consumed 2,300 m (7,600 ft) of the 3,000-metre (10,000 ft) runway.

Because the antiskid and brake modulation systems were inoperative, (Note: The on/off cycling produced by the antiskid system would rapidly deplete the limited pressure in the brake accumulator if it remained operative.) the eight main wheels locked up, the tires abraded and fully deflated within 140 m (450 ft), and the wheels themselves were worn down to the axle journals during rollout.

Fourteen passengers and two crew members had minor injuries, while two passengers had serious injuries during the evacuation of the aircraft. The plane suffered structural damage to the main landing gear (from the hard touchdown and the abrasion of the locked wheels against the runway surface during the landing roll) and the lower fuselage (both structural deformation from the hard touchdown and various punctures from impact by pieces of debris shed from the main landing gear).

== Investigation ==
The Portuguese Aviation Accidents Prevention and Investigation Department (GPIAAF) investigated the accident with extensive cooperation with the Transportation Safety Board of Canada.

The investigation revealed that the primary causal factors of the accident were crew actions in mishandling a fuel leak in the number two engine.

The fuel leak resulted from fitment of an incorrect part to the hydraulics system by Air Transat maintenance staff as part of routine maintenance. The engine had been replaced with a spare engine, lent by Rolls-Royce, from an older model, which did not include a hydraulic pump. Despite the lead mechanic's concerns, Air Transat authorized the use of a part from a similar engine, an adaptation that did not maintain adequate clearance between the hydraulic lines and the fuel line. This lack of clearance, on the order of a few millimetres from the intended part, allowed chafing between the lines to rupture the fuel line, causing the leak.

Air Transat accepted responsibility for the accident and was fined C$250,000 by the Canadian government, which as of 2009 was the largest fine in Canadian history.

The conclusions reached in the accident report revealed that:

- The flight crew did not detect that a fuel problem existed until the Fuel ADV advisory was displayed and the fuel imbalance was noted on the Fuel ECAM page.
- The crew did not correctly evaluate the situation before taking action.
- The flight crew did not recognize that a fuel leak situation existed and carried out the fuel imbalance procedure from memory, which resulted in the fuel from the left tanks being fed to the leak in the right engine.
- Conducting the fuel imbalance procedure by memory meant that the crew did not read the Caution note in the relevant checklist. Doing so might have caused the crew to consider timely actioning of the fuel leak procedure.
- Although there were a number of other indications that a significant fuel loss was occurring, the crew did not conclude that a fuel leak situation existed – failure to perform the fuel leak procedure correctly was the key factor that led to the fuel exhaustion.

Nevertheless, the pilots returned to a heroes' welcome from the Canadian press as a result of their successful unpowered landing. In 2002, Captain Piché was awarded the Superior Airmanship Award by the Air Line Pilots' Association.

== Aftermath ==
Following the accident investigation, the French Directorate General for Civil Aviation (DGAC) issued F-2002-548B, requiring a detailed fuel-leak procedure in the flight manual and the need for crews to be aware of this. This was later cancelled and replaced by F-2005-195. The US Federal Aviation Administration (FAA) issued AD 2006-02-01, effective February 3, 2006, requiring new airplane flight manual procedures to follow in the event of a fuel leak for Airbus Model A330 and A340 aircraft.

The accident led to the DGAC and FAA issuing an airworthiness directive (AD), requiring all operators of Airbus models A318, A319, A320 and A321 narrow-body aircraft to revise their flight manuals, stressing that crews should ensure that any fuel imbalance is not caused by a fuel leak before opening the cross-feed valve. The AD required all airlines operating these Airbus models to make revisions to the flight manuals before any further flights were allowed. The FAA gave a 15-day grace period before enforcing the AD. Airbus also modified its computer systems; the on-board computer now checks all fuel levels against the flight plan. It now gives a clear warning if fuel is being expended beyond the specified fuel consumption rate of the engines. Rolls-Royce also issued a bulletin advising of the incompatibility of the relevant engine parts.

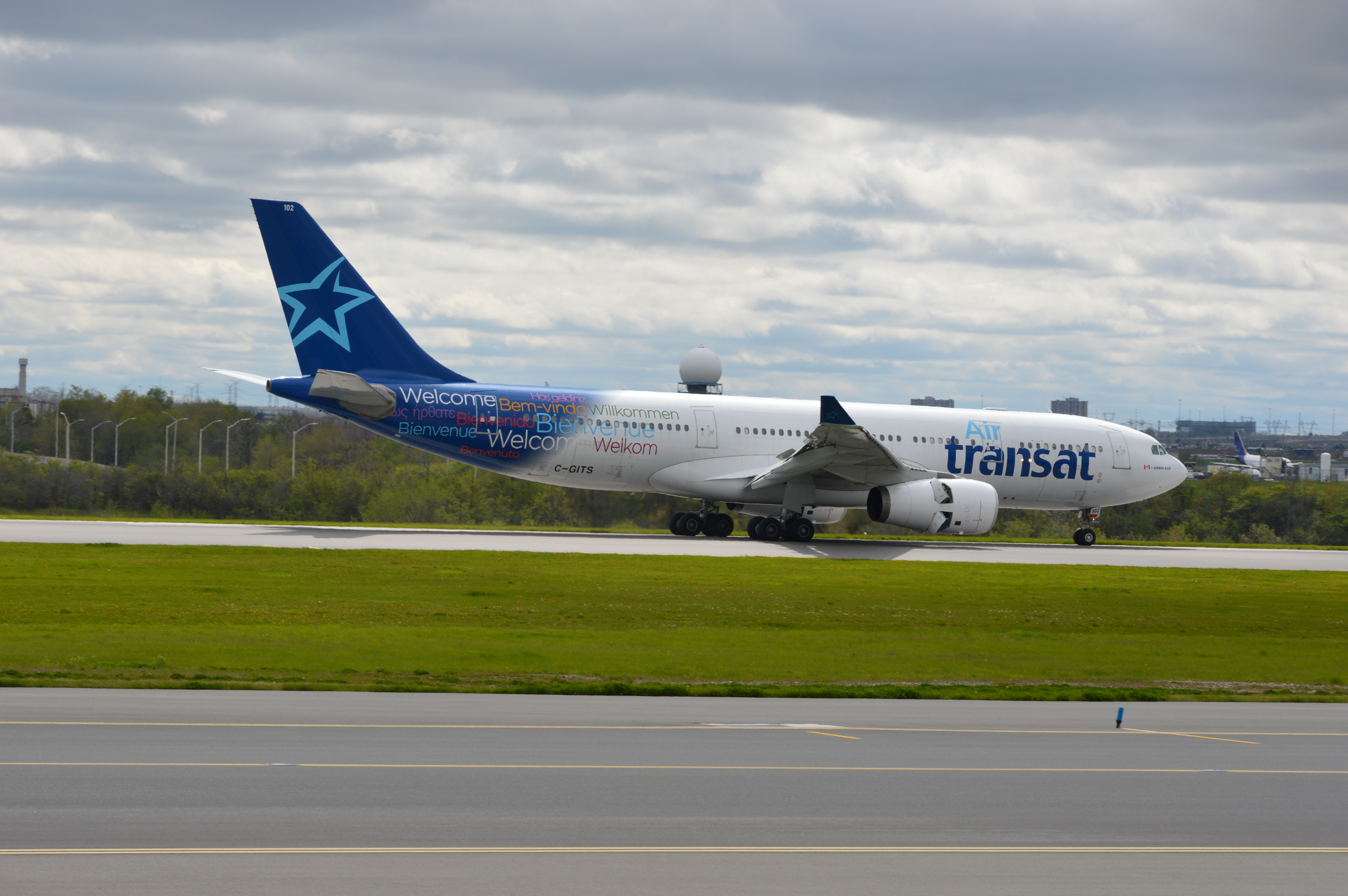
"The Azores Glider" at Toronto Pearson International Airport in 2016

This was the longest passenger aircraft glide without engines.

Margaret McKinnon, a postdoctoral psychology student at Baycrest Health Sciences in Toronto at the time, was a passenger on her honeymoon on Flight 236. She and her colleagues recruited 15 other passengers in a study of post-traumatic stress disorder (PTSD), published in August 2014 in the academic journal Clinical Psychological Science, which compared details recalled by passengers with PTSD with those recalled by passengers without PTSD and with a control group.

== In popular culture ==
- The events of Flight 236 were featured in "Flying on Empty", a season-one (2003) episode of the Canadian TV series Mayday (called Air Emergency and Air Disasters in the U.S. and Air Crash Investigation in the UK and elsewhere). The program begins with a title card announcing "This is a true story. The flight crew, Airbus, and Air Transat declined to take part. The reconstruction is based on expert opinion and known facts about the flight."
- The flight was also included in a Mayday sixth season (2007) Science of Disaster special titled "Who's Flying the Plane?"
- MSNBC produced a report on the incident with the title "On a Wing and a Prayer", which first aired in the U.S. on August 7, 2005.
- The story of Robert Piché is depicted in the 2010 Canadian biographical drama film Piché: The Landing of a Man culminating with the events on Flight 236. Captain Piché is portrayed by both Genie Award-winning actor Michel Côté and his son Maxime LeFlaguais.
- In 2015, a Singaporean heavy metal band, Across the Abyss released a song inspired by the incident titled Falling from the Sky.

== See also ==
- US Airways Flight 1549, the "Miracle on the Hudson" – glided after both engines were disabled by a bird strike
- Air Canada Flight 143, the "Gimli Glider" – glided after running out of fuel
- TACA Flight 110 – glided after water ingestion in both engines in a storm
- List of airline flights that required gliding
