= My Life Is a River =

1996 Canadian documentary film

- French: Une vie comme rivière
- Directed by: Alain Chartrand; Diane Cailhier
- Written by: Diane Cailhier; Alain Chartrand
- Produced by: Iolande Cadrin-Rossignol
- Narrated by: Alain Chartrand; Hélène Loiselle
- Cinematography: Raymond Dumas; Lynda Pelley
- Edited by: Dominique Sicotte
- Production company: National Film Board of Canada
- Release date: 1996
- Running time: 73 minutes
- Country: Canada
- Language: French

My Life Is a River (French: Une vie comme rivière) is a 1996 Canadian documentary film, directed by Alain Chartrand. The film is a portrait of Chartrand's mother, labour unionist and human rights activist Simonne Monet-Chartrand.

The film is essentially a sequel to A Man of His Word (Un homme de parole), his 1991 film about his father Michel Chartrand. It was followed in 2000 by Chartrand et Simonne, his dramatic television miniseries about their relationship.

The film received a Genie Award nomination for Best Feature Length Documentary at the 17th Genie Awards.
