= Simonne Monet-Chartrand =

Canadian activist and feminist (1919–1993)

- Born: November 4, 1919; Montreal, Quebec, Canada
- Died: January 18, 1993 (aged 73); Richelieu, Quebec, Canada
- Education: Université de Montréal
- Political party: Bloc populaire Rhinoceros Party
- Spouse: Michel Chartrand
- Children: Alain Chartrand
- Relatives: Dominique Monet (grandfather)

Simonne Monet-Chartrand (November 4, 1919 – January 18, 1993) was a Canadian labor activist, feminist writer, and pacifist.

She was an advocate for syndicalist causes and a proponent of women in the labor movement. A co-founder of Concordia University's Simone de Beauvoir Institute, dedicated to feminist studies, Monet-Chartrand also co-founded the Federation des femmes du Quebec, the pacifist movement Voix des Femmes, and the Movement for Nuclear Disarmament.

== Early life ==
Simonne Monet-Chartrand was born in Montreal, Quebec, Canada, in 1919. Her parents were Aurore-Berthe Alain and Amédée Monet, who was a judge, as was her grandfather Dominique Monet. Her family was well-off, spending summers on the Richelieu River in Beloeil. She studied at a Catholic boarding school in Montreal, and began noting the inequalities between boys and girls at a young age. A dark stain on her otherwise idyllic childhood was the death of her brother Roger, of tuberculosis; Monet-Chartrand also caught the disease, but she survived thanks to a long stay in a sanatorium in the Laurentides.

After graduating high school, she attended the Université de Montréal from 1939 to 1942, where she studied literature.

Her activist career began with joining the Jeunesse Étudiante Chrétienne, a youth organization of the Catholic social movement, during her student years. She led the organization's provincial-level board of directors and began to work with a number of influential activist figures, including fellow Catholic youth leader Michel Chartrand. Her upper-class family opposed her relationship with the working-class Chartrand—they temporarily sent her to Chicago in the United States in an effort to split the couple up, and three priests refused to marry them before they could find one who would agree to do so. Nevertheless, the two wed in 1942. They would go on to have seven children together and to support each other in their political activism.

== Career ==
Monet-Chartrand took up the cause of feminism beginning in the 1930s, fighting for women's right to vote in Quebec, which was the last province to institute women's suffrage. Her political involvement grew during the Conscription Crisis of 1944, and she joined the Bloc populaire, an anti-conscription political party.

In the 1950s, Monet-Chartrand joined the labor movement, helping the wives of strikers and arguing that women should be able to participate in union contract negotiations. She was a member of the socio-political committee for the Quebec Teachers Union, and in the '70s she worked for the teachers' union in Champlain, Quebec.

In the '60s, Monet-Chartrand co-founded the pacifist group Voix des Femmes and the Fédération des femmes du Québec, a feminist organization. Her anti-war activism had begun with opposition to World War II and an anti-nuclear instinct in response to the bombings of Hiroshima and Nagasaki, which she stuck with through the Korean War, the Cold War, the Vietnam War, and the Gulf War. She was also a co-founder of the Movement for Nuclear Disarmament.

Monet-Chartrand's activism, particularly her feminist organizing, extended internationally. She attended women's conferences in Europe and represented the Human Rights League of Quebec at conferences in the Middle East. She organized the Peace Train's arrival in Ottawa in 1962 to present the demands of feminist pacifists. She also held a conference to express these demands during Expo 67.

In 1978 and 1979, Monet-Chartrand returned to her studies at Concordia University, where she also co-founded the Simone de Beauvoir Institute, a college dedicated to feminist studies. In 1979, she was a candidate for the Rhinoceros Party, a satirical political party, to represent the district of Longueuil in Parliament. She received 5 percent of the vote.

Monet-Chartrand also worked as a journalist, contributing to various publications as a writer, including Châtelaine, La Vie en rose, and Les têtes de pioche. She was also a longtime writer, researcher, and presenter for Radio Canada, particularly for religious broadcasts and women’s broadcasts. Her work as a writer also included her four-volume autobiography, Ma vie comme rivière, which was originally published in 1981 and re-issued with updates in 1992. Her second book, focusing on her pacifist activism, was published in 1988 with the title L'espoir et le défi de la paix. She also wrote a two-volume history of Quebec's women, published in 1990 and 1994.

In 1992, she received the Prix Idola Saint-Jean for her feminist work.

In her own words, Monet Chartrand fought to "build a socialist society." She also remained a deeply religious person, true to her roots on the Catholic left. As she once said, in response to being called a "fanatic":

"Christ was a fanatic, and anybody who ever accomplished anything for their country was a fanatic."

== Death and legacy ==
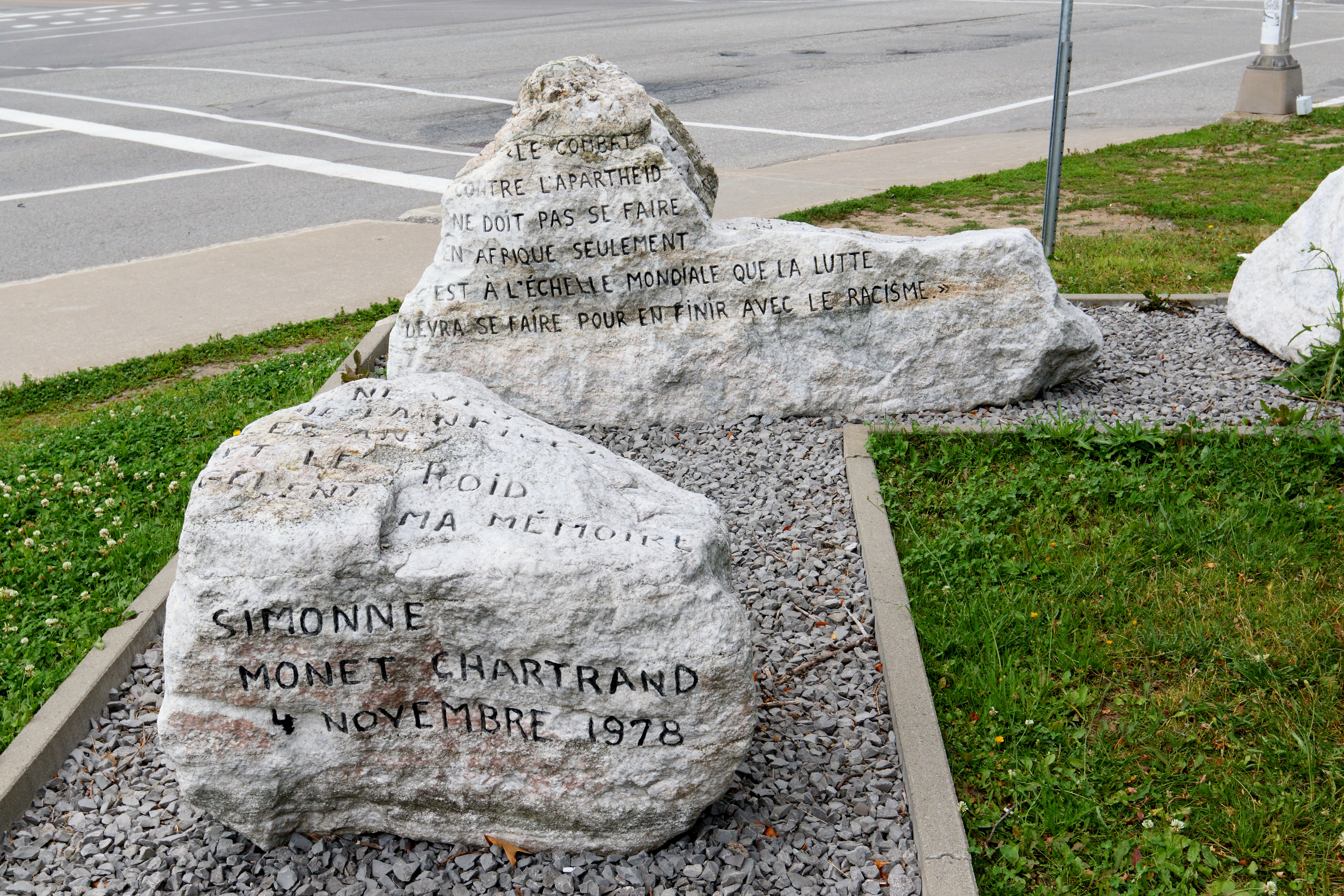
A sculpture bearing a quote from Simonne Monet-Chartrand at Laval University.

Simonne Monet-Chartrand died of cancer on January 18, 1993, in Richelieu.

In 1996, her son Alain Chartrand and the filmmaker Diane Cailhier released a film about her life, titled My Life Is a River (Une vie comme rivière). They also produced a television mini-series about Monet-Chartrand and her husband called Chartrand et Simonne in 2000.

Several buildings and institutions have been named for her, including a center for victims of domestic violence and an elementary school in Montreal.

In September 2023, Monet-Chartrand was one of three Quebec feminists and trade unionists, along with Madeleine Parent and Léa Roback, honoured by Canada Post with a postage stamp.

== Electoral record ==
1979 Canadian federal election
Party	Candidate	Votes	%	±%
Liberal	Jacques Olivier	34,207	61.3	+9.5
Social Credit	Robert S. Daoust	8,173	14.6	-1.2
Progressive Conservative	Georges Perrier	5,952	10.7	-5.5
New Democratic	Jean-Pierre Vaillancourt	3,995	7.2	-5.6
Rhinoceros	Simonne Monet Chartrand	2,556	4.6	
Union populaire	Louis Denoncourt	764	1.4	
Marxist–Leninist	Yves Boyer	176	0.3	-0.4
Total valid votes		55,823	100.0	

== See also ==
- List of peace activists

== Selected works ==
- Ma vie comme rivière, 1981
- L'espoir et le défi de la paix, 1988
- Pionnières québécoises et regroupements de femmes d'hier à aujourd'hui, 1990
- Les Québécoises et le mouvement pacifiste : 1939-1967, 1993
- Pionnières québécoises et regroupements de femmes : 1970-1990, 1994
