= Sylvain Archambault =

Canadian cineast

Sylvain Archambault (French pronunciation: [silvɛ̃ aʁʃɑ̃bo]; born March 6, 1963) is a Canadian film and television director from Quebec. He is most noted as director of the feature film Piché: The Landing of a Man (Piché, entre ciel et terre), which was the winner of the Billet d'or as the top-grossing Quebec film of the year at the 13th Jutra Awards in 2011.

He also directed the films The Canadiens, Forever (Pour toujours, les Canadiens), French Kiss, and La Garde, and episodes of the television series Le Négociateur, Les Lavigueur, la vraie histoire, Mensonges and Les Pays d'en haut.
