= Jean Duceppe (TV series) =

- Written by: Claire Wojas
- Directed by: Robert Ménard
- Country of origin: Canada

Production
- Producers: Robert Ménard; Claire Wojas

Original release
- Network: Télé-Québec
- Release: October 15 – November 19, 2002

Jean Duceppe is a French-Canadian biographical television mini-series that aired on Télé-Québec in 2002. It told the story of Jean Duceppe, a Canadian actor, and chronicled his life, in particular his work in theatre and struggle for Quebec independence. It also followed his wife Hélène Rowley and his son Gilles Duceppe, who would later become prominent as the leader of the Bloc Québécois.

The series starred Paul Doucet as Jean Duceppe and Suzanne Clément as Hélène Rowley.

== See also ==
- List of Quebec television series
- Television of Quebec
- Culture of Quebec
- History of Quebec
