= Claire Wojas =

Canadian screenwriter and film producer

Claire Wojas (April 13, 1949 – May 19, 2018) was a Canadian screenwriter and film producer. She was most noted for the 1991 film Love Crazy (Amoureux fou), for which she received Genie Award nominations for both Best Original Screenplay and Best Original Song at the 12th Genie Awards in 1991.

Her other credits included the films Cruising Bar, You're Beautiful, Jeanne (T'es belle Jeanne), Water Child (L'enfant d'eau), Cruising Bar 2 and Stay with Me (Reste avec moi), and the television series Un amour de quartier, Jean Duceppe and Chartrand et Simonne.

She was married to Robert Ménard, her cowriter and director of virtually all of her films.
