= Anna's Garden =

1992 Canadian drama film

- French: Le Jardin d'Anna
- Directed by: Alain Chartrand
- Written by: Alain Chartrand; Diane Cailhier
- Based on: Mona et Je t'aime la vie by Ginette Bureau
- Produced by: Robert Ménard
- Starring: Danielle Proulx; Roger Léger; Jessica Barker
- Cinematography: Michel Caron
- Edited by: Yves Chaput
- Music by: François Dompierre
- Production company: Les Productions Videofilms
- Distributed by: T.V-films Associés
- Release date: September 3, 1992 (FFM)
- Running time: 80 minutes
- Country: Canada
- Language: French

Anna's Garden (French: Le Jardin d'Anna) is a Canadian drama film, directed by Alain Chartrand and released in 1992. The film centres on a family whose 11-year-old daughter Anna (Jessica Barker) is battling childhood leukemia.

The cast also includes Danielle Proulx and Roger Léger as Anna's parents Louise and Paul and Alexandrine Latendresse as the younger Anna in flashbacks, as well as Vincent Bolduc, Marie-Claude Lefebvre, Carmen Ferlan, Jacques Girard, Steve Gendron, Christine Anthony, André Dostal and Robert Patenaude in supporting roles.

The film premiered at the 1992 Montreal World Film Festival. It was subsequently screened at the Abitibi-Témiscamingue International Film Festival, where it won the Grand Prix du Public.

It was distributed principally as a television film, airing as an episode of the arts anthology series Les Beaux Dimanches in January 1993.

The film received nine Gémeaux Award nominations in 1993, with Pierre Saindon winning the award for Best Makeup and Hair.
