= Danielle Proulx =

French Canadian actress (born 1952)

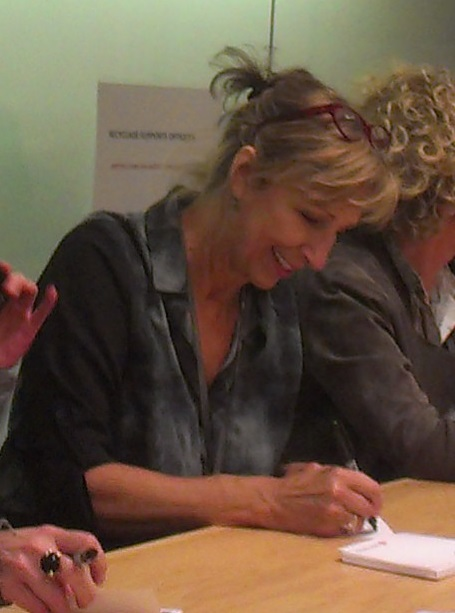
- Born: October 12, 1952 (age 72); Montreal, Quebec, Canada
- Years active: 1970s-present
- Spouse: Raymond Cloutier (1973-1987)
- Children: Émile Proulx-Cloutier

Danielle Proulx (born October 12, 1952) is a French Canadian actress.

== Early life ==
Danielle Proulx was born on October 12, 1952 in Montreal, Quebec.

== Career ==
She is a two-time Genie Award winner for Best Supporting Actress, for her roles in Love Crazy (Amoureux fou) in 1991 and C.R.A.Z.Y. in 2005.

In 2019, she played the regular role of Grand-Mère in a revival of the influential children's series Passe-Partout.

== Personal life ==
She was married to Raymond Cloutier from 1973 to 1987. Her son, Émile Proulx-Cloutier, is also an actor, as is her niece, Catherine Proulx-Lemay.

== Filmography ==
=== Film ===
Year	Title	Role	Notes
1978	Au bout du doute		Short film
1979	Histoire vécue		Short film
1982	Bleue Brume		Short film
1989	Looking for Eternity (Portion d'éternité)	Marie Lemieux	
1991	Love Crazy (Amoureux fou)	Judith	
1993	The Sex of the Stars (Le sexe des étoiles)	Singer	
1995	Water Child (L'enfant d'eau)	Pauline	
2005	C.R.A.Z.Y.	Laurianne Beaulieu	
2006	Pourquoi le dire?		
2006	Family History (Histoire de famille)	May Gagné	
2008	Truffles (Truffe)	Mme Tremblay	
2008	The Deserter (Le Déserteur)	Léda Couture	
2010	Stay with Me (Reste avec moi)	Maggie	
2011	Monsieur Lazhar	Mme Vaillancourt	
2012	Les jours qui suivront	Nurse	
2015	12 Weeks (12 semaines)	Woman in kiosk	
2018	The Far Shore (Dérive)	Mme Dubois	
2019	In the Dark	Grandmother	
2024	A Christmas Storm (Le Cyclone de Noël)	Louise	

=== Television ===
Year	Title	Role	Notes
1985	L'Agent fait le bonheur	Carmen Côté	
1989-91	Super sans plomb	Margot Dumont	
1992	Anna's Garden (Le jardin d'Anna)		
1990	Jamais deux sans toi	Isabelle Bégin	
1993-96	Zap	Michelle Viau	
1993-95	Les Intrépides	Claire Boileau	
1994-96	Les héritiers Duval	Isabelle Bégin	
1995	Scoop IV	Diane Cardinal	
1997-2001	Sous le signe du lion	Annette Julien	
1998	Jamais sans amour: L'Obsession	Madeleine	
1999	La Femme du boulanger	Angèle	
1999	Cornemuse	Cornemuse	
2001-03	Mon meilleur ennemi	Claire Lebeau	
2003	Les aventure tumultueuses de Jack Carter	Mariette Benoit	
2003	Chartrand et Simonne	Hospital director	
2006	Casino	Marianne Dumas	
2006	Lance et compte: La revanche	Marie-Ève Charest	
2009	Lance et compte: Le Grand duel	Marie-Ève Charest	
2009	Aveux	Pauline Laplante	
2014-19	Unité 9	Henriette Boulier	
2018-20	Fugueuse	Manon	
2018-20	Lâcher prise	Rachel	
2019	Passe-Partout	Grandmother	
2019-22	Une autre histoire	Lise Beauregard	
2021	Way Over Me (Sortez-moi de moi)	Louise Courteau	
2022-24	L'Œil du cyclone	Louise	
