= Alain Chartrand =

Canadian film director (1946–2023)

- Born: February 2, 1946; Longueuil, Quebec, Canada
- Died: December 11, 2023 (aged 77)
- Occupation(s): Film and television director
- Spouse: Diane Cailhier
- Parent(s): Michel Chartrand; Simonne Monet-Chartrand

Alain Chartrand (February 2, 1946 – December 11, 2023) was a Canadian film director and screenwriter. The son of prominent Quebec social activists Michel Chartrand and Simonne Monet-Chartrand, he was most noted for several film and television works about his parents, including the theatrical documentary films A Man of His Word (Un homme de parole) and My Life Is a River (Une vie comme rivière), and the television miniseries Chartrand et Simonne.

He was also active in developing and supporting trade unions for film production crew, taught in the film studies programs at the Institut national de l'image et du son and the Université du Québec à Montréal, and published the memoirs Le métier d'assistant-réalisateur au cinéma (1990) and Chartrand, cinéaste (2007) about his filmmaking career.

He died on December 11, 2023, at the age of 77.

== Filmography ==
Film

Year	Title	Director	Writer
1972	Isis au 8 (Note: Also credited as producer and editor)	Yes	Yes
1976	Back to the Land (La Piastre)	Yes	No
1983	L'Étau-bus	Yes	No
1988	Friends for Life (Des amis pour la vie)	Yes	No
1990	Ding et Dong (Ding et Dong, le film)	Yes	No
1991	A Man of His Word (Un homme de parole)	Yes	Yes
1991	School's Out (Une nuit à l'école)	Yes	No
1992	Anna's Garden (Le Jardin d'Anna)	Yes	No
1996	My Life Is a River (Une vie comme rivière)	Yes	Yes
2013	Summer Crisis (La Maison du pêcheur)	Yes	No

Television

- 1992 – Montréal ville ouverte
- 1996 – Innocente
- 1997 – Paparazzi
- 2000–2003 – Chartrand et Simonne

Acting roles

- 1965 – The Revolutionary (Le Révolutionnaire)
- 1989 – Cruising Bar : assistant director
- 1989 – How to Make Love to a Negro Without Getting Tired (Comment faire l'amour avec un nègre sans se fatiguer) : police officer #1
- 1991 – Four Stiffs and a Trombone (L'Assassin jouait du trombone) : Sergeant

== Awards ==
Award	Year	Category	Work	Result	Ref(s)
Anik Award	1983	Best Original Drama	L'Étau-bus	Won	
Clermont-Ferrand International Short Film Festival	1985	Prix du Public de la compétition internationale	L'Étau-bus	Won	
Abitibi-Témiscamingue International Film Festival	1992	Grand Prix Hydro-Québec	Anna's Garden (Le Jardin d'Anna)	Won	
Genie Awards	1996	Best Feature Length Documentary	My Life Is a River (Ma vie comme rivière)	Nominated	
Gémeaux Awards	1993	Best Direction in a Dramatic Series	Anna's Garden (Le Jardin d'Anna)	Nominated	
Gémeaux Awards	1995	Best Direction in a Dramatic Series	Scoop IV	Nominated	
Gémeaux Awards	1996	Best Direction in a Dramatic Series	Innocence	Nominated	
Gémeaux Awards	2000	Best Direction in a Dramatic Series	Chartrand et Simonne	Won	
