= Parti de la démocratie socialiste =

Parti de la démocratie socialiste Party of Democratic Socialism
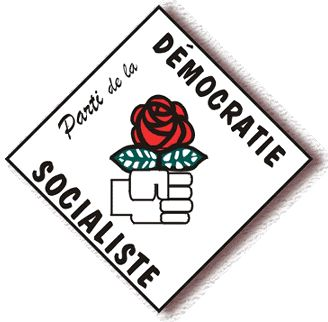
- Founded: 1939 (as FCC); 1963 (as NPDQ)
- Dissolved: 2002
- Merged into: Union des forces progressistes
- Ideology: Social democracy; Democratic socialism; Quebec nationalism (after 1989)
- Political position: Centre-left to left-wing
- National affiliation: New Democratic Party (until 1991)
- Colours: Orange

The Parti de la démocratie socialiste (French pronunciation: [paʁti də la demɔkʁasi sɔsjalist], PDS; English: Party of Democratic Socialism) was a provincial political party in Quebec, Canada.

Its roots go back to 1939, as the Quebec branch of the Co-operative Commonwealth Federation (later the New Democratic Party, NDP). The party was long affiliated with its federal counterpart and known as the New Democratic Party of Quebec (NPDQ) from 1963 to 1994. As the NPDQ became increasingly favourable towards Quebec nationalism, it separated from the federal NDP in 1989 before disaffiliating entirely in 1991. It adopted the PDS name in 1994. A new section of the federal NDP, called New Democratic Party of Canada – Québec Section was founded in 1990; it is active only in federal politics.

== History ==
=== Foundation and early history ===
The party was founded in 1939 as the Fédération du Commonwealth Coopératif (FCC), the Quebec counterpart of Canada's federal Co-operative Commonwealth Federation (CCF) party. It was led by Romuald-Joseph Lamoureux in the 1944 general election, where the FCC won 2.89% of the vote and elected one MLA: David Côté in Rouyn-Noranda. However, Côté left the party in 1945 to sit as an independent and did not seek re-election.

The party was led by Thérèse Casgrain from 1951 to 1957, during which the name Parti social démocratique du Québec (Social Democratic Party of Quebec) was adopted in 1955, and by Michel Chartrand from 1957 to 1960.

=== Refoundation and federal focus ===
After the CCF became the New Democratic Party (NDP) in 1961, the NPDQ was created in 1963 following the concerted efforts of the Quebec Federation of Labour and of the Quebec section of the CCF. However, the party soon split over the issue of Quebec self-determination. In November 1963, Quebec sovereigntists left to form the Parti socialiste du Québec (PSQ), including former leader Chartrand.

As a result of the split, the NPDQ was active exclusively on the federal political level in Quebec, implicitly leaving the provincial political level to the pro-independence PSQ. After the PSQ became defunct around 1968, the NPDQ continued to concentrate most of its attention on the federal level during the 1970s and the early 1980s. It made a few incursions on the provincial level, running a few candidates, first in the Quebec general election of 1970, and later in the general election of 1976, the second time as part of a coalition with the Regroupement des militants syndicaux (RMS). On the federal level, in its role as the Quebec section of the NDP, the NPDQ contested the Canadian federal elections between 1962 and 1988.

The provincial party became defunct following leader Henri-François Gautrin's resignation in 1979.

In the mid-1980s, the federal NDP's Quebec section determined that there was a new political vacuum in Quebec politics and that, in addition to its role in federal politics, the time had come for the NPDQ to return to the provincial scene. The NPDQ registered as a political party in Quebec in 1985 and selected Jean-Paul Harney as leader. It ran in the general elections in 1985, 1989 and 1994.

=== Break with the federal party ===
In 1989, the NPDQ voted to disaffiliate from the federal NDP as a result of policy differences, such as the provincial party's opposition to the Meech Lake Accord; its support for Quebec's language policy; differences with the federal party over the Canada–United States Free Trade Agreement; and its more favourable position towards Quebec nationalism. As a result, the NPDQ redirected its activities to the provincial level, and its members became free to adhere to any federal political party. Similarly, the federal NDP directed its activities in Quebec exclusively on the federal political level, through its Quebec branch renamed the New Democratic Party of Canada (Quebec Section), which runs candidates only in federal elections and whose members became free to adhere to any provincial political party in Quebec. Practically, this brought the situation back to what it had been between 1963 and 1968, but with the difference that the NPDQ, which after the first division of 1963 had ended up being an organization centred on federal politics, now ended up being an organization centred on provincial politics after the second division of 1989. During this time, the party came under the influence of sovereigntists.

Tensions between the provincial and federal parties came to a head in 1990 when the NPDQ announced its support for Gilles Duceppe's candidacy as a Bloc Québécois candidate in a federal by-election and urged federal NDP candidate Louise O'Neill to withdraw from the contest so as not to split the vote. As a result, the federal party voted to sever its "fraternal ties" to its former provincial wing and the provincial party was encouraged to change its name. The federal NDP denounced the provincial party when it nominated former Front de libération du Québec member Paul Rose as a candidate in a provincial by-election. Rose had been convicted for his role in the murder of Pierre Laporte during the 1970 October Crisis. The federal NDP announced that they were seeking legal means to force the NPDQ to stop calling using the name "New Democratic".

The last election the NPDQ contested under that name was the general election of 1994.

=== Later history and successors ===
After the 1994 election, the NPDQ decided to change its name to Parti de la démocratie socialiste (PDS). Rose was elected its leader two years later. Under this new name, the PDS contested the general election of 1998.

In 2002, the PDS became a part of the left-wing coalition Union des forces progressistes (UFP; Union of Progressive Forces), together with the Rassemblement pour l'alternative progressiste (RAP; Union for a Progressive Alternative) and the Communist Party of Quebec. As a consequence, the PDS withdrew its official party registration with the chief electoral officer and participated under the UFP banner in the Quebec general election of 2003. In 2006, the UFP merged with Option citoyenne to form Québec solidaire. It remains an organized tendency within the new coalition under the name "Québec socialiste". Québec solidaire contested the 2007 general election and won its first seat in the National Assembly in 2008.

In 2014, supporters of the federal NDP founded a new New Democratic Party of Quebec (NPDQ) which stood 59 candidates in the 2018 provincial election receiving 0.57% of the vote.

== Electoral results ==
General election	Name of party	Leader	# of candidates	# of elected candidates	% of popular vote
1936	CCF (Note: A candidate ran as "CCF candidate" in the 1936 Quebec general election, although the Quebec section of the party had not been founded yet.)	n/a	1/90	0	0.26%
1939	FCC	n/a	1/86	0	0.45%
1944	FCC	Romuald-Joseph Lamoureux	26/91	1	2.89%
1948	FCC	n/a	8/92	0	0.60%
1952	FCC	Thérèse Casgrain	23/92	0	0.96%
1956	PSD	Thérèse Casgrain	26/93	0	0.61%
1960	PSD	Michel Chartrand	1/95	0	0.01%
1962	The party was not active in this election.				
1966	NPDQ	Robert Cliche	The party did not run candidates in this election.		
1970	NPDQ	Roland Morin	13/108	0	0.15%
1973	NPDQ	Henri-François Gautrin	The party did not run candidates in this election.		
1976	NPDQ-RMS coalition	Henri-François Gautrin	21/110	0	0.05%
1981	NPDQ	none	The party did not run candidates in this election.		
1985	NPDQ	Jean-Paul Harney	90/122	0	2.42%
1989	NPDQ	Roland Morin	55/125	0	1.22%
1994	NPDQ	Jean-François Sirois	41/125	0	0.85%
1998	PDS	Paul Rose	97/125	0	0.59%

== Party leaders ==
FCC/PSD

- none (1939–1944)
- Romuald-Joseph Lamoureux (1944)
- none (1944–1951)
- Thérèse Casgrain (1951–1957)
- Michel Chartrand (1957–1960)

NPDQ

- Robert Cliche (1964–1968)
- Roland Morin (1970–1973)
- Henri-François Gautrin (1973–1979)
- none (1979–1985)
- Jean-Paul Harney (1985–1988)
- Roland Morin (1987–1989)
- Gaétan Nadeau (1989–1990)
- Michel Parenteau (1990–1992)
- Jean-François Sirois (1992–1994)

PDS

- Jocelyne Dupuis (1994–1996)
- Paul Rose (1996–2002)

== See also ==
- List of Quebec general elections
- List of Quebec leaders of the Opposition
- List of Quebec premiers
- National Assembly of Quebec
- Political parties in Quebec
- Politics of Quebec
- Timeline of Quebec history
