= Rassemblement pour l'alternative progressiste =

The Rassemblement pour l'alternative progressiste (French pronunciation: [ʁasɑ̃bləmɑ̃ puʁ laltɛʁnativ pʁɔɡʁɛsist], RAP; English: Rally for a Progressive Alternative) began as the Rassemblement pour l'alternative politique, a social movement founded in 1997 as an attempt to unite the progressive and leftist forces in Quebec, Canada. It presented seven independent candidates (including former trade union leader Michel Chartrand) in the 1998 Quebec provincial election, and became a political party in 2000.

In 2002, it joined with the Parti de la démocratie socialiste and the Parti communiste du Québec to form the Union des forces progressistes (UFP). In 2006, the UFP joined with the Option citoyenne social movement to form the Québec solidaire party.

== See also ==
- Politics of Quebec
- List of Quebec general elections
- List of Quebec premiers
- List of Quebec leaders of the Opposition
- National Assembly of Quebec
- Timeline of Quebec history
- Political parties in Quebec
