= Jennifer Tackett =

American psychologist

- Born: Jennifer Lee Tackett
- Education: Texas A&M University; University of Minnesota-Twin Cities
- Scientific career
- Fields: Personality psychology
- Workplaces: Northwestern University
- Thesis: Investigating personality-psychopathology relationships in childhood: Highlighting aggressive versus non-aggressive antisocial behaviors (2006)

Jennifer Lee Tackett is an American psychologist and professor of psychology at Northwestern University, where she is the principal investigator of the Personality Across Development lab. She is a fellow of the Association for Psychological Science, and has been the editor-in-chief of its journal Clinical Psychological Science since January 1, 2021.
