= Wild Flowers (2024 film) =

2024 Canadian short film directed by Rodolphe Saint-Gelais and Thierry Sirois

- French: Les Fleurs sauvages
- Directed by: Rodolphe Saint-Gelais; Thierry Sirois
- Written by: Rodolphe Saint-Gelais
- Produced by: David Francke-Robitaille; Isabelle Grignon-Francke
- Narrated by: Christian Bégin
- Edited by: Rodolphe Saint-Gelais; Thierry Sirois
- Production company: Club Vidéo
- Distributed by: Welcome Aboard
- Release date: March 2024 (Regard)
- Running time: 7 minutes
- Country: Canada

Wild Flowers (French: Les Fleurs sauvages) is a Canadian animated short film, directed by Rodolphe Saint-Gelais and Thierry Sirois and released in 2024. Narrated by actor Christian Bégin, the film is structured as a voice mail message conveying instructions to the recipient on how to mow the lawn outside the narrator's house, while the animation uses a mixture of diagrams and anthropomorphic figures to introduce humour and comedy to a seemingly banal and mundane subject, until the film climaxes with the narrator changing his mind about having his lawn mown at all due to his love of the wildflowers that grow at that time of year.

The film premiered at the Regard short film festival in March 2024. It was subsequently screened at the 2024 Sommets du cinéma d'animation, and the 2024 Ottawa International Animation Festival.

== Awards ==
Award	Date of ceremony	Category	Recipient(s)	Result	Ref.
Abitibi-Témiscamingue International Film Festival	2024	Prix Télé-Québec	Rodolphe Saint-Gelais, Thierry Sirois	Won	
Prix Iris	December 8, 2024	Best Animated Short Film	Rodolphe Saint-Gelais, Thierry Sirois, David Francke-Robitaille, Isabelle Grignon-Francke	Nominated	
