= Water Child =

- French: L'Enfant d'eau
- Directed by: Robert Ménard
- Written by: Claire Wojas
- Produced by: Robert Ménard; Roger Frappier
- Starring: David La Haye; Marie-France Monette; Gilbert Sicotte; Monique Spaziani
- Cinematography: Michel Caron
- Edited by: Michel Arcand
- Music by: Ronald de Gagné; Richard Grégoire
- Production companies: Les Productions Vidéofilms; Max Films Productions; National Film Board
- Release date: 1995
- Running time: 103 minutes
- Country: Canada
- Language: French

Water Child (French: L'Enfant d'eau) is a Canadian drama film, directed by Robert Ménard and released in 1995. The film stars David La Haye as Émile, a mentally handicapped young adult who survives a plane crash, finding himself on an otherwise deserted island with Cendrine (Marie-France Monette), a teenage girl.

The film's cast also includes Gilbert Sicotte, Danielle Proulx and Monique Spaziani.

The film received two Genie Award nominations at the 16th Genie Awards: Best Actor (La Haye) and Best Original Score (Richard Grégoire). La Haye won the award for Best Actor.
