= Léa Roback =

Canadian activist (1903–2000)

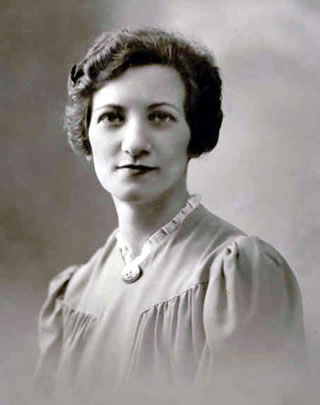
- Photo of Roback in the collection of the Jewish Public Library
- Born: November 3, 1903; Plateau-Mont-Royal, Montreal, Quebec, Canada
- Died: August 28, 2000 (aged 96); Côte-des-Neiges, Montreal, Quebec, Canada
- Education: University of Grenoble (B.A.)
- Political party: Communist (1932–1958)
- Other political affiliations: KPD (Germany, 1929-1932)

Léa Roback (3 November 1903 – 28 August 2000) was a Canadian trade union organizer, social activist, pacifist, and feminist. She campaigned against exclusion, violence, racism, and injustice. A polyglot and suffragist, she was a pioneer of feminism in Quebec.

== Early years ==
Born in Montreal, Quebec, on Guilbault Street in 1903, the second of nine children, she was the daughter of Polish Jewish immigrants. Her father was a tailor who, along with his wife, Fanny, ran a general store. They were the only Jews in Beauport, the town in which Roback grew up. She spoke Yiddish at home, French with Beauport locals, and English at school. Her family valued reading and the arts. In her youth, she was influenced by her maternal grandmother, an independent woman.

With her family, Roback returned to Montreal in 1915. While working at British American Dyeworks, she became aware of the differences between the various sectors of Montreal society. Her next job was as a cashier at Her Majesty's Theatre. Interested in literature, she saved money to enroll at the University of Grenoble in 1926, earning a Bachelor of Arts degree. On her return from Grenoble, she joined her sister in New York City.

== Career ==
In 1929, she went to Berlin to visit her brother Henri, a medical student. She learned the German language, took university courses, and taught English to pay for her classes. She also visited England and Italy, developing a strong commitment to Communism. On May 1, 1929, during her time in Berlin, Roback joined the Communist Party of Germany. She felt seduced by the socialists, but she believed they did not put their words into action, hence she shifted her support to Marxism-Leninism. In her 1988 interview with Nicole Lacelle, Roback said that it was during that period that she gained genuine political consciousness. In the fall of 1932, with the Nazi Party steadily gaining power, Roback, a Jew, foreigner, and communist, was left to return to Montreal on the advice of her professors, whereupon she joined the Communist Party of Canada. In 1934, she spent a few months in the Soviet Union with a lover. (Note: Roback married in Europe at some point, but the marriage was annulled.) Returning for good to Montreal, she participated in the organization of the unemployed, which was led by Norman Bethune. She also worked at the Young Women's Hebrew Association. In 1935, she established the first Marxist bookshop in Montreal, Modern Book Shop, on Bleury Street.

With Thérèse Casgrain, Roback fought for woman's suffrage in Quebec in 1936. ŧhe same year, the International Ladies' Garment Workers' Union dispatched Rose Pesotta, a veteran union organizer from New York, to establish the ILGWU in Montreal. She was aided by Roback, who was uniquely helpful in uniting the garment workers because of her ability to speak Yiddish, French, and English. She ultimately helped organize 5,000 garment workers, who had been on a three-week strike in 1937. Roback helped unionize RCA Victor in 1941, where she remained until 1951. She won the first union contract for women in 1943 but did not want to become a union representative or climb up the union power structure.

Roback was a political organizer for the Fred Rose's ultimately successful campaign in the 1943 Cartier federal by-election for the Communist Party.

After steadily distancing herself from the CPC, Roback left the party in 1958 after the Soviet invasion of Hungary.

In 1960, she became a member and played an active role in the organization "Voice of Women" (La Voix des Femmes in Montreal) alongside Madeleine Parent, Thérèse Casgrain, and Simonne Monet-Chartrand. She denounced the Vietnam War and apartheid in South Africa, campaigned against the proliferation of nuclear weapons, and was a proponent of free access to a quality education. A feminist, she fought to obtain the right to vote for the right to abortion and access to contraception. Roback also fought for the residents of Saint-Henri to receive decent housing.

At the age of 83 and in the pouring rain, she participated in the women's march for pay equity. In 1985, she became an honorary member of the Canadian Institute for Research on Women. She died in Côte-des-Neiges in 2000, becoming a Knight (Chevalier) of the National Order of Quebec in the same year.

== Legacy ==
"There is nothing that I like better than to be standing on a street corner, passing out leaflets, because it is how you come to understand what people are about."
- L. Roback

Her memory is perpetuated by the work of the Lea Roback Foundation, created in 1993, which provides scholarships to socially-committed women. "Le centre Léa-Roback", a research center in Montreal for social inequalities, is also named in her honour, as is the Maison Parent-Roback, originally situated in Old Montreal and now located in the Park-Extension district. Sophie Bissonnette made a documentary on Roback's life in 1991. Two streets were named in her honour in the 2000s: Rue Léa-Roback in the Saint-Henri district of Montreal, and a street of the same name in Beauport, where she spent time in her youth. In September 2023, Roback was one of three Quebec feminists and trade unionists, along with Madeleine Parent and Simonne Monet-Chartrand, honoured by Canada Post with a postage stamp.

The Léa Roback Foundation (Fondation Léa Roback) awards scholarships to women residing in Québec who are socially committed and economically disadvantaged.
