= You're Beautiful, Jeanne =

- French: T'es belle, Jeanne
- Written by: Claire Wojas
- Directed by: Robert Ménard
- Starring: Marie Tifo; Pierre Curzi; Michel Côté
- Music by: Richard Grégoire
- Country of origin: Canada
- Original language: French

Production
- Producers: Monique Létourneau; Robert Ménard
- Cinematography: Jean-Charles Tremblay
- Editor: Hélène Girard
- Running time: 99 minutes
- Production company: Les Productions Vidéofilms

Original release
- Network: Télé-Québec
- Release: October 29, 1988

You're Beautiful, Jeanne (French: T'es belle, Jeanne) is a Canadian drama film, directed by Robert Ménard and released in 1988. The film stars Marie Tifo as Jeanne, a woman who becomes paraplegic in an accident, resulting in the decline of her relationship with her husband Paul (Pierre Curzi) and the opportunity at new love with Bert (Michel Côté), another paraplegic man she meets in a physical rehabilitation program.

The cast also includes Angèle Coutu, Diane Jules, Claude Maher and Marie Michaud.

The film premiered in August 1988 at the Montreal World Film Festival, before being broadcast by Télé-Québec on October 29. It also received some theatrical screenings in 1990.

The film won five Gémeaux Awards in 1989, for Best Television Drama, Best Actor in a Television Drama (Côté), Best Actress in a Television Drama (Tifo), Best Direction in a Television Drama (Ménard) and Best Script in a Television Drama (Claire Wojas).
