= Cruising Bar 2 =

2008 film by Robert Ménard

- Directed by: Robert Ménard; Michel Côté
- Written by: Michel Côté; Robert Ménard; Claire Wojas
- Produced by: Claude Bonin; Robert Ménard; Claire Wojas
- Starring: Michel Côté; Véronique Le Flaguais; Lise Roy
- Cinematography: Pierre Mignot
- Edited by: Michel Arcand
- Music by: Jean-Marie Benoît
- Production company: Les Productions Vidéofilms Ltée
- Release date: June 27, 2008
- Running time: 100 minutes
- Country: Canada
- Language: French

Cruising Bar 2 is a 2008 Canadian comedy film, directed by Robert Ménard and Michel Côté. A sequel to the 1989 film Cruising Bar, the film stars Côté as the same four separate characters he played in the original film, now dealing with much more middle-aged sexual and relationship issues.

Gérard's wife Gertrude (Véronique Le Flaguais) has finally had enough of his constant infidelity, and is filing for divorce; Patrice is in a downward spiral after his girlfriend breaks up with him; Jean-Jacques is struggling with erectile dysfunction issues which have led his psychiatrist to suggest that he might actually be gay; Serge, perennially unlucky in love, tries Internet dating which may finally change his life for the better.

The film's cast also includes Marie-France Duquette, Chantal Dauphinais, Lise Roy, Noémie Yelle and Hélène Major.

== Awards ==
Côté received a Jutra Award nomination for Best Actor at the 11th Jutra Awards, and the film's make-up team (Adrien Morot, Réjean Goderre, Marie-France Guy, Bruno Gatien, Nathalie Trépanier) won the Genie Award for Best Makeup at the 29th Genie Awards.

It was the top-grossing Quebec film of 2008, and was awarded Telefilm Canada's Guichet d'or and Québec Cinéma's Billet d'or.
