= Ministry of Planning (Portugal) =

Government ministry of Portugal

- Ministério do Planeamento

Ministry overview
- Formed: 2000
- Preceding agencies: Ministry of Infrastructure, Planning and Territorial Administration (1999); Ministry of Planning and Infrastructure (2019)
- Dissolved: 30 March 2022
- Jurisdiction: Government of Portugal
- Headquarters: Lisbon
- Minister responsible: Minister for Planning

The Ministry of Planning (Portuguese: Ministério do Planeamento), formerly Ministry of Public Works, Transport and Communications (Ministério das Obras Públicas, Transportes e Comunicações or MOPTC) was a Portuguese government ministry. It had its head office in Lisbon.

The Gabinete de Prevenção e Investigação de Acidentes com Aeronaves was a subordinate agency.
