= Union des forces progressistes (Quebec) =

Union of Progressive Forces Union des forces progressistes
- Abbreviation: UFP
- Leader: Leading council
- President: François Cyr
- Founded: June 2002
- Dissolved: 4 February 2006
- Merger of: RAP; PDS; PCQ
- Merged into: Québec solidaire
- Headquarters: 2177 Masson Street; Suite 412; Montreal, Quebec; H2H 1B4
- Ideology: Democratic socialism; Quebec independence; Anti-capitalism; Left-wing nationalism
- Political position: Left-wing
- Colours: Green, orange, red

Website
- ufp.qc.ca

The Union des forces progressistes ([ynjɔ̃ de fɔʁsə pʁɔɡʁɛsist], UFP) was a left-wing political party in Quebec, Canada, active from 2002 to 2006.

== History ==
The Union des Forces Progressistes (UFP) was formed in 2002 out of desire to unite Québec's leftists into a political party. Four parties merged to form the Union:

- the Rassemblement pour l'alternative progressiste (RAP),
- the Parti de la démocratie socialiste (PDS), formerly the New Democratic Party of Quebec
- the Parti communiste du Québec (PCQ), and
- the Québec-based membership of the International Socialists.

On 5 November 2005, delegates of the UFP voted unanimously in favour of a merger with the party of the Option citoyenne movement led by Françoise David. The founding congress of the new party was held on 4 February 2006 and resulted in the formation of a new party, Québec solidaire.

== Principles and aims ==
The aim of the UFP was to bring together progressive forces across the broad left wing of the political spectrum, including social democrats, socialists and communists. The UFP also advocated altermondialism, feminism, pacifism and green politics. Its platform did not specifically endorse social democracy, socialism, or communism.

The Green Party of Quebec pledged to try to avoid running candidates in ridings where there was a UFP candidate, although it reserved the right to run anywhere it wants to (even ridings with a UFP candidate), and did not merge with the UFP.

The UFP presented itself as an alternative to the main three parties in Québec: the centre-left Parti Québécois, the centre-right Quebec Liberal Party, and the conservative Action démocratique du Québec/Equipe Mario Dumont, saying that all three are but different faces of the same right-wing ideology called neoliberalism.

The UFP opposed globalization, privatization, and deregulation, and called for increased funding of social services, higher taxes on the rich and business, proportional representation in the National Assembly of Quebec, and an alternative economy based upon co-operatives and nonprofit organizations.

The UFP supported Québec sovereignty. It considered this option not as an end in itself, but rather as a means to achieve the party's social ideal for the people of Québec. To solve the national question, the UFP suggested the creation of a Constituent Assembly, mandated to draw up and propose to the population, via referendum, a Constitution for a progressive, republican, secular, and democratic Québec.

The UFP was led by a council instead of a single leader. The UFP promised to be a party of the ballot box and of the streets, meaning that it would work to increase awareness of social problems and for progressive social change even between elections, particularly with regards to the rights of workers and of the unemployed.

Considering its modest results in the 2003 elections (1.06% of the votes or 1.50% if the Green Party of Québec's votes were included), the UFP was a marginal party.

== UFP position on the national question ==
From the Preamble of the UFP political platform, Building a world that reflects our ideals! :

UFP members share the view that the answer to the national question, and by extension social emancipation, is sovereignty for the Quebec people. The UFP believes that Quebec should become a country, free from the federalist yoke, and should acquire the essential tools it needs to develop as a nation.

== Representatives ==
- Pierre Dostie and Molly Alexander (2002–2004)
- Amir Khadir and Denise Veilleux (2004–2006)

== Election results ==
General election	# of candidates	# of elected candidates	% of popular vote
2003	73	0	1.06%

== See also ==
- David Fennario
- List of Quebec leaders of the Opposition
- Political parties in Quebec
- Politics of Quebec
- SPQ Libre
