= Superior Airmanship Award =

Aviation award given by the Air Line Pilots Association

The Superior Airmanship Award is an aviation award given by the Air Line Pilots Association (ALPA). The awards are presented at the ALPA Annual Air Safety Awards Banquet and is accompanied by video recreations of the events, filmed in simulators and scripted from eyewitness accounts, which led to the awards.

== Recipients ==
Eastern Air Lines – Captain James Robertson and F/O J.L. Bellmer received the award for their skill at handling a thrust reverser opening in flight causing the aircraft to roll while operating Eastern Airlines flight 494. (1984)

Northwest Airlines – Captain Ronald E. Weldon, F/O Andrew E. Faust, and S/O William A. Jensen received the award for handling a major flight control malfunction. (1994)

Comair Airlines, Inc. – Captain David M. Mitchell and F/O Hank Clay were presented with the award for handling a failed landing gear situation. (1996)

Air Transat – Captain Robert Piché and F/O Dirk Dejager received their awards for achieving the longest glide of an airliner after running out of fuel on Air Transat Flight 236. (2001)

Northwest Airlines – The crew of Northwest Airlines Flight 85, Senior Captain John Hanson, Junior Captain Frank Geib, F/O Mike Fagan and David Smith received the Superior Airmanship award for their skill at landing a Boeing 747 with a hard over rudder. (2002)

US Airways – Captain Henry Jones and F/O Jim Dannahower were awarded Superior Airmanship Awards for their quick reactions and expert adjustment of their takeoff maneuver in the 2005 Logan Airport runway incursion. (2005)

Jazz (airline) – Captain Michael Nelson and F/O Paul Cafouros received the award for their skill landing their Bombardier CRJ100/200 in poor weather, low fuel and flaps stuck in the landing position. (2006)

United Airlines – Captain Scott Stoops and F/O Brad Loper received the award for avoiding a potential runway incursion situation with an Atlas Air Boeing 747-400. (2006)

Compass Airlines (North America) – Captain Steven Peterka, F/O Clifton “Lee” Cain, and Flight Attendant Gloria Heurematte received the award for their performance and outstanding teamwork as they successfully conducted an emergency landing as a result of an inflight cabin fire. (2008)

United Airlines – Captain Everett “Ross” Miller and F/O Douglas Cochran received the award for their exemplary performance in preventing a catastrophe aboard United Airlines Flight 731, which suffered a near-total electrical failure with accompanying loss of all radio communications moments after taking off from Newark. (2008)

Jazz (airline) – Captain Paul Ivey and F/O Ed Paterson received the award for landing with severely damaged windscreen and corresponding electrical failure/fire. (2009)

Atlantic Southeast Airlines – Capt. Yngve Paulsen and F/O Michael Aguzino received the award for dealing with a main landing gear that didn't extend. (2009)

Continental Airlines – Captain Brent Black, Captain Steven Wycoff, and F/O Daniel Montgomery were recognized with Superior Airmanship Awards for their superb handling of an engine failure shortly after takeoff. (2009)

American Eagle (airline brand) – Captain Mark Davis and F/O Andres Rubio were recognized with Superior Airmanship Awards for their outstanding performance in preventing the catastrophic loss of Flight 4756 after a malfunction of the aircraft’s flight controls during flight. (2009)

United Airlines – Captain Dale Nordhausen and F/O John Eskuri received the award for safely landing their disabled Airbus A319, a landing gear door failed to fully open and blocked the right main landing gear from extending and locking into position, requiring a partial gear-up landing. (2010)

Alaska Airlines – Captain Steve Cleary and F/O Michael Hendrix received the award for their skill during an aborted take-off after striking an eagle, causing catastrophic engine damage. (2011)

ExpressJet – Captain Micah Peery and F/O Andrew Kinnear were given their award for their handling of an onboard fire. (2012)

Delta Air Lines – Capt. James Judkins and F/O Michael Oates received the award for their handling of an electrical malfunction related to a generator issue. (2014)

ExpressJet – Captain Terry VanHoose and F/O Mark Moser received the award when their aircraft experienced a critical system failure due to a lightning strike and subsequent loss of air data computers. (2015)

Virgin America – Captain Tony Ristaino and F/O John Grieff received the award for their skill dealing with a flight control malfunction. (2016)

United Airlines – Captain Chris Behnam, Captain Paul Ayers and F/O Ed Gagarin safely landed United Airlines Flight 1175, a Boeing 777, in Honolulu after experiencing a catastrophic engine failure over the Pacific Ocean. (2018)

Wasaya Airways – Captain William Ryan Mitchell and F/O Joshua Siefert received the award for their handling of an electrical failure and smoke in the flight deck which resulted in the loss of primary flight instruments. (2019)

== See also ==
- List of aviation awards
- Airmanship
- Polaris Award
