= Sarah-Jeanne Labrosse =

Canadian actress

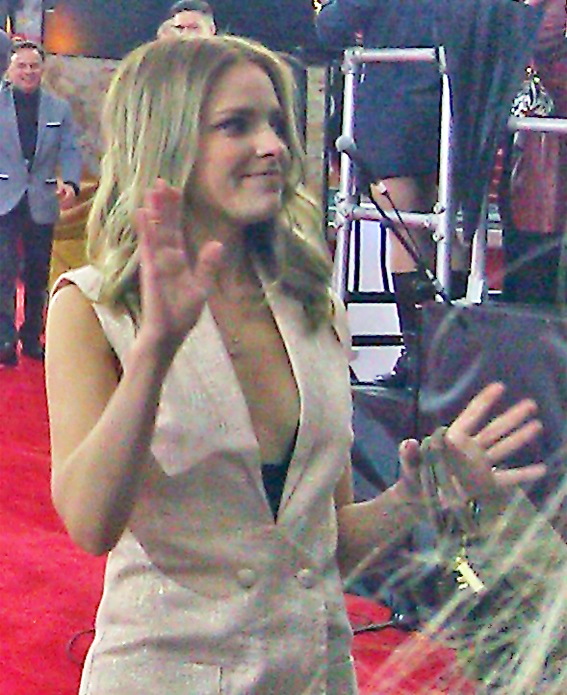
- Born: August 16, 1991 (age 34); Montreal, Quebec, Canada
- Occupation: Actress
- Years active: 1997–present

Sarah-Jeanne Labrosse (born August 16, 1991) is a Canadian actress from Quebec, most noted for her leading role as Donalda in the 2016-2021 television drama series Les Pays d'en haut. The role garnered her a Gémeaux Award nomination for Best Actress in a Drama Series in 2017, and an Artis Awards for Best Actress in a Drama Series in 2019.

== Career ==
In 2025 she was announced as having a supporting role in the upcoming television series adaptation of Bon Cop, Bad Cop, reprising her childhood role as David Bouchard's daughter Gabrielle in the original film.

== Filmography ==
=== Film ===
Year	Title	Role	Notes
2004	Summer with the Ghosts (Un été avec les fantômes)	Caroline	
2005	Aurore	Marie-Jeanne Gagnon	
2006	Bon Cop, Bad Cop	Gabrielle	
2007	Eastern Promises	Tatiana	
2009	The Trotsky	The School Girl	
2010	Piché: The Landing of a Man (Piché: entre ciel et terre)	Geneviève Piché	
2011	Starbuck	Julie	
2012	Sandra	Sandra	Short
2014	C'est plus facile de liker que dire je t'aime	Clara	Short
2016	Trolls	Poppy	French Canadian dub
2017	Un jour mon prince!	Blondine	
2017	Bon Cop, Bad Cop 2	Gabrielle	
2017	mother!	Foremother	
2018	The Death and Life of John F. Donovan	Moira's assistant	
2018	The Extraordinary Journey of the Fakir	Rose	
2018	Mad Dog Labine		
2021	La Contemplation du mystère		
2022	Very Nice Day (Très belle journée)	Élyane Boisjoli	

=== Television ===
Year	Title	Role	Notes
1997	Le volcan tranquille		
2000	Willie	Family Member	One episode
2004–06	15/Love	Sunny Capaduca	
2005	Human Trafficking	Annie Gray	
2007	Nos étés	Lison Belzile	Four episodes
2011	Le gentleman	Nadia Ouellet	Two episodes
2011	30 vies	Annie-Jade Tremblay	60 episodes
2012–15	Unité 9	Laurence Belleau	51 episodes
2013	L'appart du 5e	Victoire 'Vicky' Lachapelle	
2014	Yamaska	The Girl	One episode
2014	Féminin/Féminin	Julie	Five episodes
2015	Mensonges	Mercedes Torres	One episode
2015	Madame Lebrun	Geneviève	
2016	Real Detective	Pam	One episode
2016	Les Pays d'en haut	Donalda Laloge	
2018	Anatane: Saving the Children of Okura		(voice)
2020	Doomsday Brothers (Les frères apocalypse)	Danika	(voice; French version)
2026	Bon Cop, Bad Cop	Gabrielle Bouchard	
