= Parti socialiste du Québec =

Parti socialiste du Québec Socialist Party of Quebec
- Founded: November 1963
- Dissolved: 1968
- Split from: New Democratic Party of Quebec
- Preceded by: Parti social démocratique du Québec (Quebec chapter of the CCF)
- Ideology: Quebec nationalism; Quebec sovereigntism; Social democracy; Democratic socialism; Trade unionism
- Political position: Centre-left to left-wing

The Parti socialiste du Québec (French pronunciation: [paʁti sɔsjalist dy kebɛk], PSQ, English: Socialist Party of Quebec) was a provincial party in Quebec. The PSQ was founded in November 1963 as the result of a split at the founding conference of the original New Democratic Party of Quebec, held in June 1963, over the issue of Quebec self-determination with Michel Chartrand, former leader of the Parti social démocratique du Québec, among the nationalists supporting self-determination.

The federalist NDP-Québec decided to concentrate its efforts on organizing for federal elections, leaving the more sovereigntist Parti Socialiste du Québec to work on the provincial level.

While the party never managed to become an officially registered political party, it unofficially stood five candidates in the 1966 provincial election, by which time Chartrand had moved to a harder separatist position and joined the Rassemblement pour l'Indépendance Nationale, before dissolving in 1968, with many of its members joining the newly formed Parti Québécois (which was both separatist and social democratic), while others rejoined the NDPQ, which would begin to run candidates in provincial elections in 1970.

The PSQ published a journal titled Le Peuple.

== Leaders ==
- Michel Chartrand 1963-1966
- Jean-Marie Bédard 1966-1968

== Electoral results (Quebec general elections) ==
General election	Leader	# of candidates	# of elected candidates	% of popular vote
1966	Jean-Marie Bédard	5/108	0	0.05%
