= Robert Piché =

Canadian airline pilot (born 1952)

- Born: November 5, 1952 (age 74); Quebec City, Quebec, Canada
- Occupation: Pilot
- Known for: Air Transat Flight 236

Robert Piché (born November 5, 1952) is a retired Canadian pilot. On August 24, 2001, he was captain of the Airbus A330 flying Air Transat Flight 236 and managed to land the aircraft safely in the Azores after it lost all power due to fuel exhaustion. As of November 2026, this remains a record glide length for a commercial aircraft in non-powered flight. Piché and his co-pilot were later assigned partial responsibility for the incident.

== Early life and education ==
Piché grew up in Quebec's Gaspé Peninsula and learned to fly as a teenager. In 1973, he graduated from CEGEP de Chicoutimi with a college diploma in aircraft piloting.

== Airline career ==
After graduation, he worked for regional airlines until he was laid off by Quebecair. After being laid off, he worked odd jobs, which consisted of smuggling marijuana to the United States by plane.

Beginning in November 1983, Piché served 16 months of a 5-year sentence in prison after a plane he landed solo at a small airfield in the state of Georgia was found to be full of marijuana smuggled from Jamaica. He was released on March 20, 1985. He was pardoned in 2000 and is considered fully rehabilitated.

In 1995, Air Transat hired Piché, then 43 years old. He rose rapidly from co-pilot to captain on the Lockheed L-1011 TriStar, and he transitioned to the Airbus A330 in the spring of 2000.

On October 1, 2017, Piché flew his last commercial flight. He retired from commercial flying after piloting TS605 from Rome to Montreal. Although this was his last commercial flight, his very last flight for Air Transat took place on October 12, 2017, when he flew C-GKTS, an A330-300 on a sightseeing flight from Montreal, over Quebec City and back to Montreal. The flight was a fundraiser for his foundation, "La Fondation Robert Piché" which helps fund programs dedicated to helping people with drug and alcohol addictions.

== Emergency landing ==
Piché is best known for performing a deadstick landing of an Airbus A330 (C-GITS) in the Azores in 2001. He glided the Airbus A330 longer than any commercial aircraft in history, and he landed at an airport on a remote island with limited navigation instruments. He was able to successfully land the plane (with only 8 blown tires) with only a few injuries among the crew and 306 passengers. In a response to a reporter's question regarding heroism, Mr. Piché stated: "I don't consider myself a hero, sir. I could have done without this." Canada's other successful landing of a fuel-starved aircraft was Air Canada Flight 143 (the "Gimli Glider") in 1983, and Vanity Fair mentioned Piché's flight when it covered the successful water landing of US Airways Flight 1549.

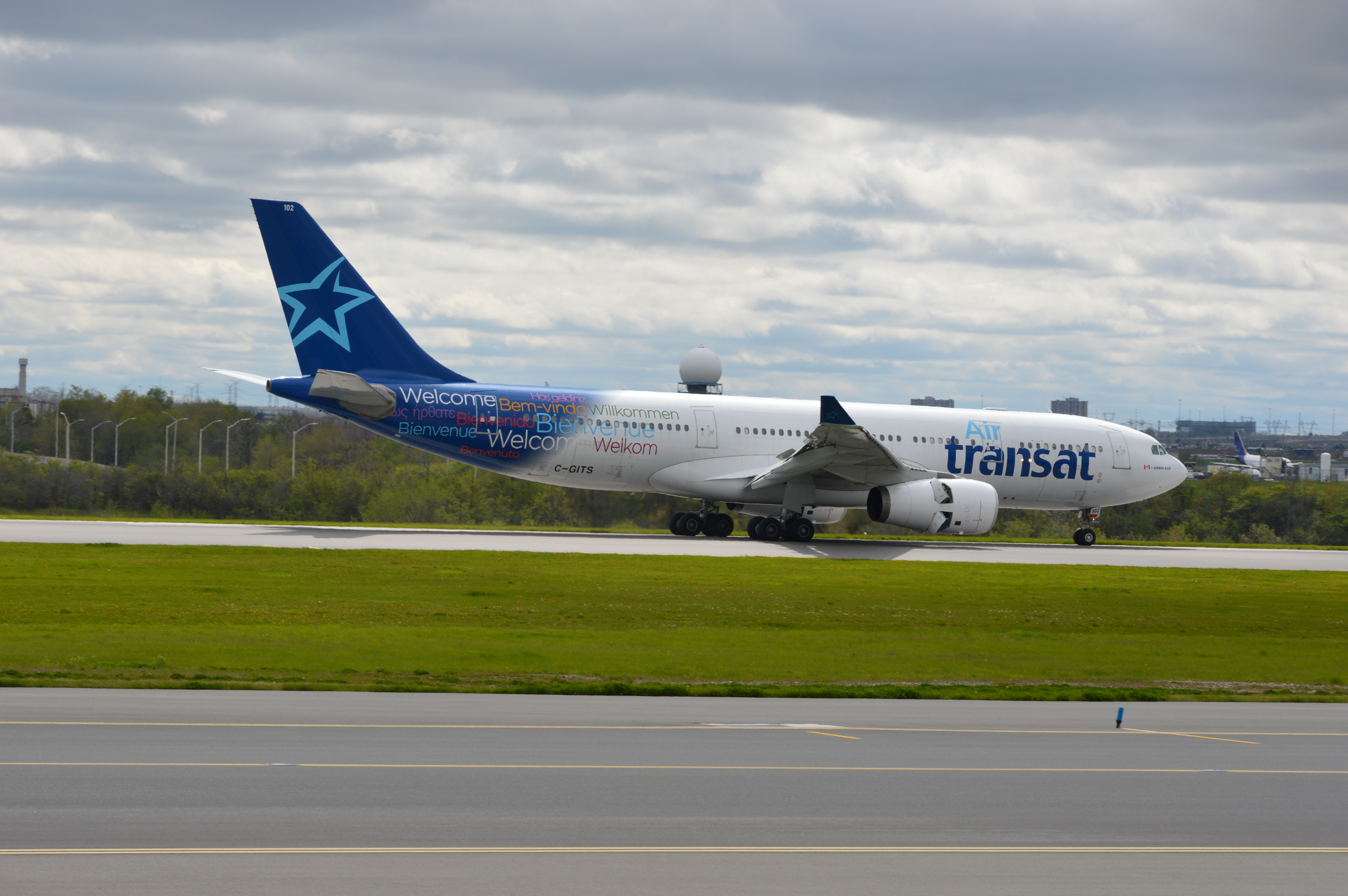
"The Azores Glider" at Toronto Pearson International Airport in 2016

The primary cause of the incident was improper maintenance, caused by an incorrect part installed in the hydraulic system, resulting in the fuel leak. However, the final investigation also assigned the flight crew partial responsibility for failing to detect the fuel situation earlier. Review of the cockpit voice recorder showed that the pilot failed to use the main procedural checklist when attempting to rectify the imbalance of fuel between the tanks, which might have prevented the extent of the fuel leak on one side. The pilot also transferred fuel from the working engine to the failing engine which magnified the crisis.

Despite this, Piché was praised by media and was celebrated as a hero, especially in Quebec, where he remains a popular speaker. Experienced pilots praise the captain for not panicking or trying to make a sea landing. In 2002, Piché was awarded the Superior Airmanship Award by the Air Line Pilots Association in recognition of his extraordinary skill in successfully executing the dead-stick landing of an Airbus A330.

== In popular culture ==
The story of Robert Piché is depicted in the 2010 Canadian biographical drama film Piché: The Landing of a Man (Piché: Entre ciel et terre, FR), culminating with the events on Flight 236. Captain Piché is portrayed by both Michel Côté as an adult, and Côté's son Maxime Le Flaguais as a child. Piché is also portrayed in the television series Mayday in its episode "Flying on Empty". Piché's Azores landing is the inspiration for a scenario in the board game Sky Team.
