= Office for the Prevention and Investigation of Accidents in Civil Aviation and Rail =

Portuguese air and rail safety body

- Gabinete de Prevenção e Investigação de Acidentes com Aeronaves e de Acidentes Ferroviários
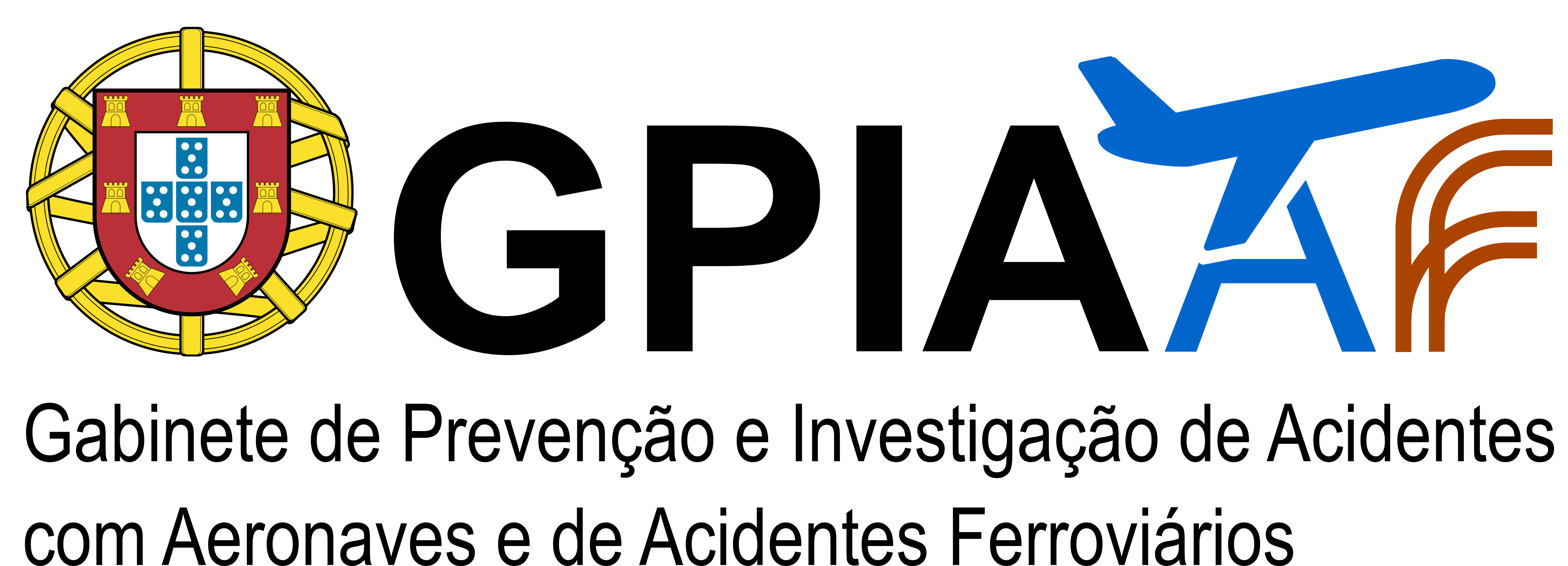
- Logo of Gabinete de Prevenção e Investigação de Acidentes com Aeronaves e de Acidentes Ferroviários (GPIAAF)

Aviation accident and incident investigation authority overview
- Jurisdiction: Portugal
- Headquarters: Lisbon
- Parent department: Ministry of Public Works, Transport and Communications
- Website: www.gpiaaf.gov.pt (Portuguese)

The Office for the Prevention and Investigation of Accidents in Civil Aviation and Rail (Gabinete de Prevenção e Investigação de Acidentes com Aeronaves e de Acidentes Ferroviários, GPIAAF) is the Portuguese aviation and rail accident and incident investigation authority. The agency is headquartered in Lisbon. It is subordinate to the Ministry of Public Works, Transport and Communications.

Formerly it was the Office of Prevention and Investigation of Aircraft Accidents (Gabinete de Prevenção e Investigação de Acidentes com Aeronaves, GPIAA).

== See also ==
- Air Transat Flight 236, 2001; Airbus 330 had to glide to the Azores after fuel leak, a result of poor maintenance
- Air Astana Flight 1388, 2018; Embraer E-Jet had to land at Beja Airbase after severe control problems, a result of a maintenance error
- Ascensor da Glória derailment, 2025; cable snapped on a funicular railway in Lisbon, killing 16
