= Véronique Le Flaguais =

French actress (born 1947)

- Born: 30 November 1947 (age 77); Paris, France
- Occupation: Actress
- Years active: 1972-present
- Spouse: Michel Côté
- Children: Charles Côté; Maxime Le Flaguais

Véronique Le Flaguais (born 30 November 1947) is a French actress who has acted in many Canadian productions.

Her work includes a Genie Award nomination for her supporting role in Surviving My Mother, Rumeurs, Jesus of Montreal (Jésus de Montréal), Cruising Bar and the sequel Cruising Bar 2.

She was married to actor Michel Côté until his death on 29 May 2023. Their son Maxime Le Flaguais is also an actor.
