= French Kiss (2011 film) =

- DVD cover
- Directed by: Sylvain Archambault
- Written by: José Fréchette
- Produced by: Luc Martineau; Lorraine Richard
- Starring: Claude Legault; Céline Bonnier; Didier Lucien; Suzanne Champagne; Isabelle Guérard; Stéphane Breton; Raymond Cloutier
- Production company: Cité-Amérique
- Distributed by: TVA Films
- Release date: March 11, 2011
- Running time: 124 minutes
- Country: Canada
- Language: French

French Kiss is a 2011 French-language Canadian romantic comedy directed by Sylvain Archambault.

== Plot ==
Frédérik (Claude Legault) is a businessman prone to flirting. Meeting Juliette (Céline Bonnier), a lonely librarian, he tries the old pick-up line: "Haven't we met somewhere before?" To his surprise, Juliet mistakes him a former colleague named Robert. Frédérik has trapped himself and plays along pretending to be Robert.
