= 2025 Ascensor da Glória derailment =

2025 railway accident in Portugal

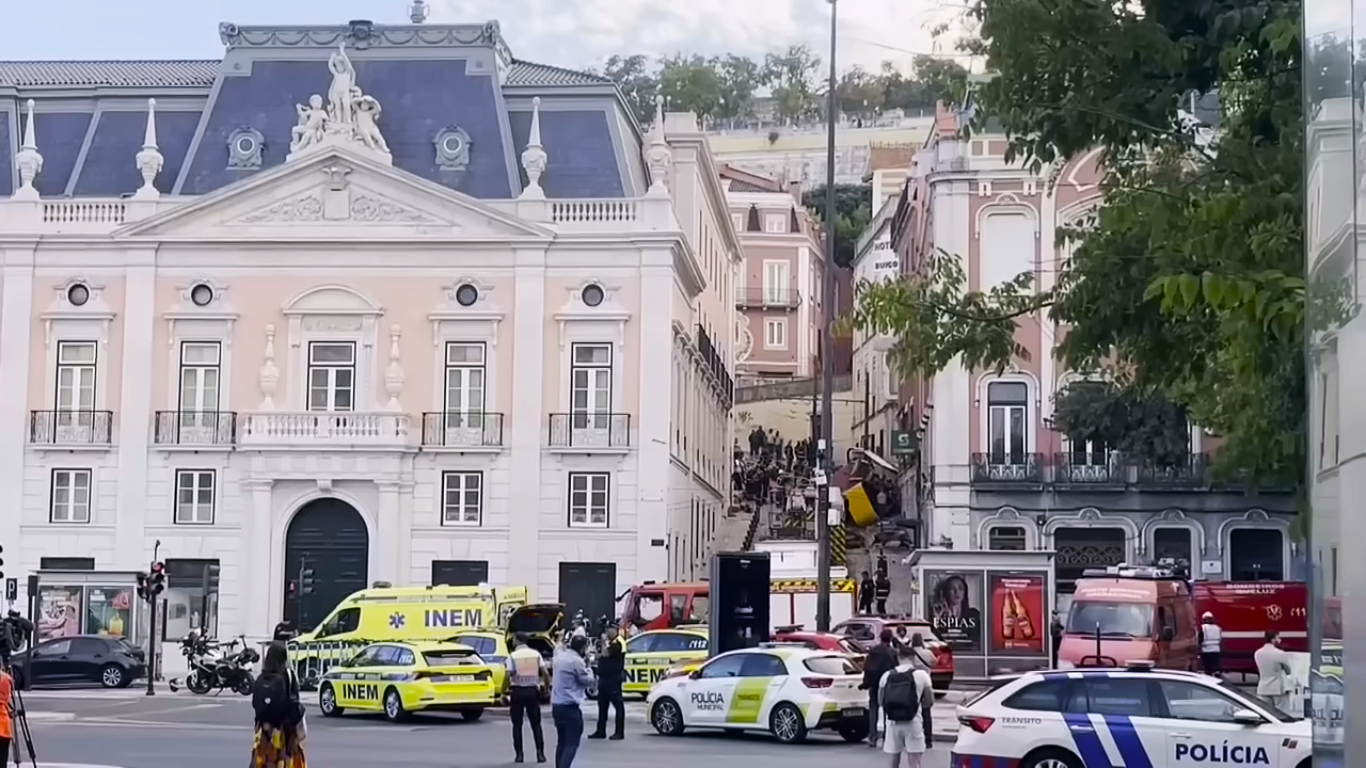
- Immediate aftermath of the derailment, as seen from Restauradores Square, with dark yellow derailed car toppled into building on right.

Details
- Date: 3 September 2025; 18:04 WEST
- Location: Lisbon, Portugal
- Coordinates: 38°42′58″N 9°08′35″W
- Line: Ascensor da Glória
- Incident type: Derailment
- Cause: Broken cable due to fatigue (suspected)

Statistics
- Passengers: c. 40+ (maximal capacity: 43, 42 passengers and one conductor)
- Pedestrians: 1 reported to have been hit by derailed car
- Deaths: 16
- Injured: 23
- Damage: Building damaged, car no. 1 wrecked
Route map

At 18:04 WEST on 3 September 2025, a car of Ascensor da Glória, a funicular connecting Bairro Alto and Restauradores Square in Lisbon, Portugal, derailed and crashed, resulting in 16 deaths and 23 injuries. The funicular was popular with tourists, and most of the casualties were foreign nationals. The car at the top of the hill sped uncontrollably downhill before derailing and hitting a building near the bottom.

A national day of mourning was declared following the accident. An investigation into the incident was launched by the Office for the Prevention and Investigation of Accidents in Civil Aviation and Rail (GPIAAF) and Carris, Lisbon's public transport operator. An initial report by GPIAAF, issued on 6 September, stated that the cable connecting the two cabins of the Glória elevator had broken at its attachment point to the top car.

== Background ==
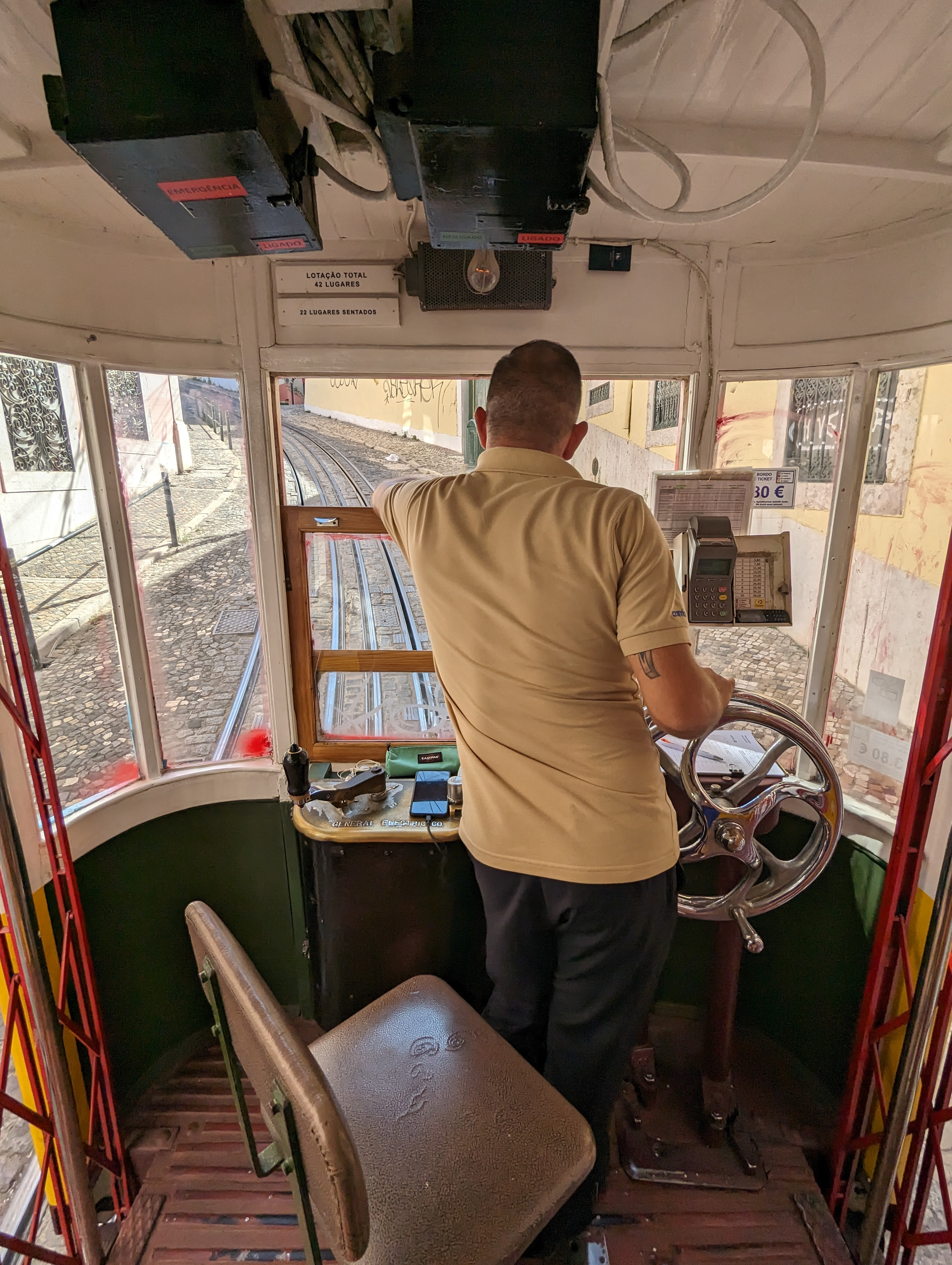
An operator's view from the cabin of car No. 1 in July 2023, showing the location of its fatal derailment.

The Ascensor da Glória is one of three street-running funicular routes operating in Lisbon. With a capacity of 42 passengers on each car, it serves the route between Bairro Alto and Restauradores Square. The two cars, which are attached by a haulage cable, use on-board electric motors to provide propulsion. The route spans about 265 metres (870 ft) at a slope of 17.7% (10.0°). It was designated as a national monument in 2002 and is a popular mode of transport for tourists and locals.

The maintenance of Lisbon's funiculars had been outsourced since 2011. The last public tender for maintenance was opened in 2022, to which four companies applied, after which Carris signed a contract with MAIN – Maintenance Engineering, worth €1 million, covering the Glória, Bica, and Lavra funiculars, as well as the Santa Justa Lift. According to the Carris workers' union, the company's employees had repeatedly reported poor maintenance work by MAIN.

The Ascensor da Glória was last placed under general maintenance, which is held every four years, in 2022. Its most recent immediate maintenance, held every two years, was conducted between 26 August and 30 September 2024. A routine daily visual inspection was carried out nine hours before the derailment.

A few hours after the 2025 disaster, Carris CEO Pedro de Brito Bogas (in office since May 2022) stated to the press that "the maintenance protocol was scrupulously followed" by MAIN and that it included monthly, weekly and daily inspections.

An earlier incident had occurred in May 2018, when one of the cars derailed due to a lack of maintenance of its wheels, though the name of the outsourced contractor supplying maintenance at that time is not mentioned in the press. No one was injured.

== Derailment ==
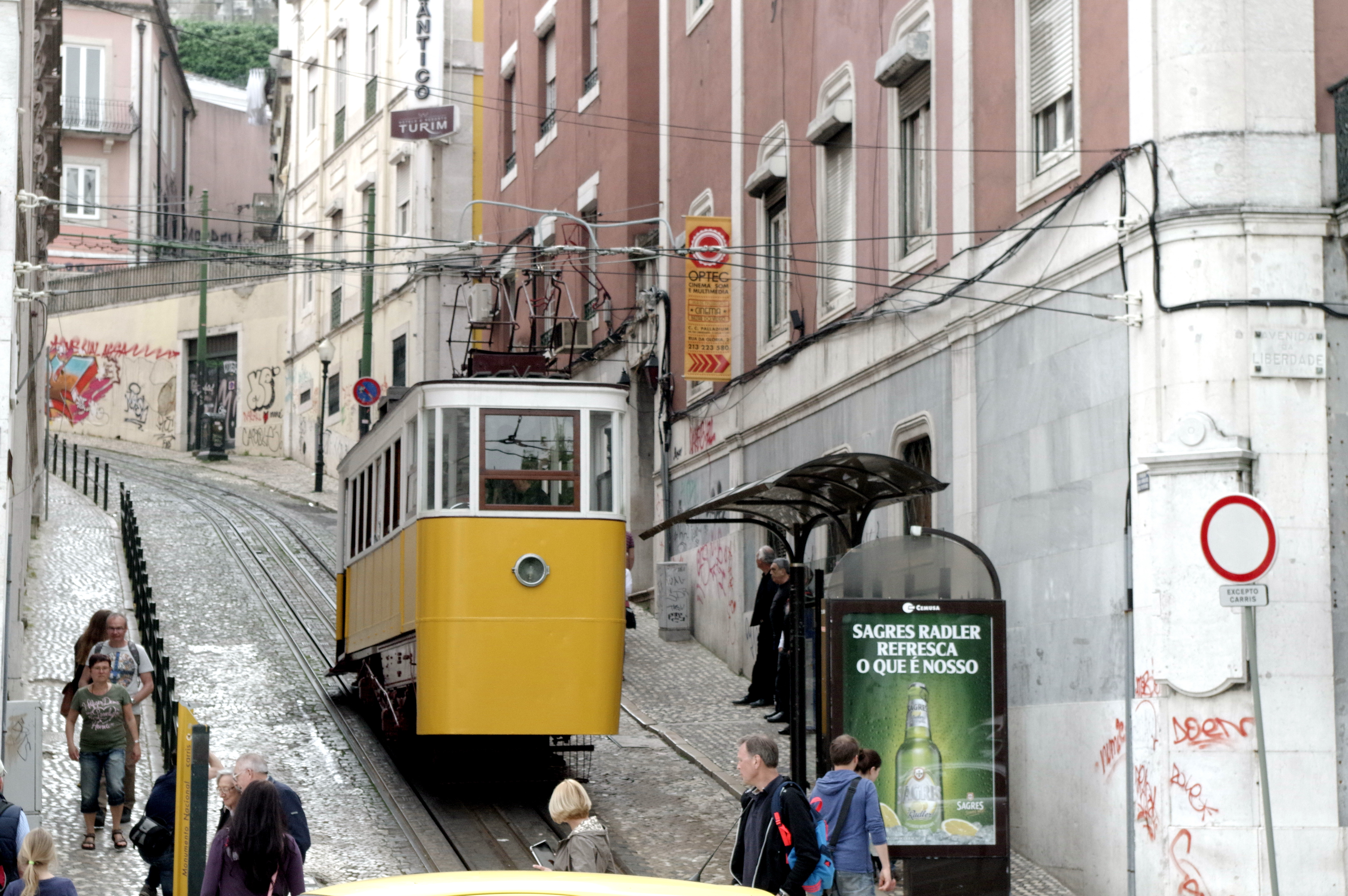
Car 1 at the lower station of the tramway pictured in April 2014

The funicular derailment occurred at 18:04 (WEST), at the start of the evening rush hour. Car 1, at the time descending from the upper part of the slope, crashed into a building and was destroyed. The other carriage, Car 2, was ascending from the bottom of the slope. According to witnesses, Car 2 initially jolted and struck the pavement at the time of the incident. As bystanders attempted to free passengers from the now-stationary carriage, Car 1 began travelling uncontrollably down the slope before hitting a building at a bend along Calçada da Glória close to Avenida da Liberdade, near the bottom of the line. One person on the sidewalk was reported to have been hit by the carriage as it toppled. The investigating agency confirmed that the entire sequence occurred in "less than 50 seconds".

Footage on national and social media showed the damaged vehicle lying on its side after the crash. According to Rádio e Televisão de Portugal, citing local authorities, the car was carrying more than 40 people at the time of the crash. Portuguese newspaper Observador and the Lisbon fire department initially said a loose cable had caused the vehicle to become uncontrollable and crash into the building.

Following the crash, 62 rescue personnel and 22 emergency vehicles attended the scene. Video footage of the aftermath of the crash, posted shortly afterwards, showed bystanders running to assist victims.

== Victims ==
Casualties by citizenship
Citizenship	Dead	Injured	Total
Portugal	5	5	10
United Kingdom	3	–	3
Canada	2	1	3
South Korea	2	1	3
France	1	1	2
Switzerland	1	1	2
United States	1	1	2
Ukraine	1	1	2
Germany	–	3	3
Brazil	–	2	2
Spain	–	2	2
Australia	–	1	1
Cape Verde	–	1	1
Israel	–	1	1
Italy	–	1	1
Morocco	–	1	1
Total	16	23	39

The crash killed 16 people and injured 23 others, including five who were in critical condition. Seven injured were taken to São José Hospital while the rest were treated at the Hospital de Santa Maria and Hospital de São Francisco Xavier.

The fatalities were identified as five Portuguese and 11 of other nationalities; all were adults. The Portuguese deaths were brakeman André Marques and four staff members of charitable organization Santa Casa da Misericórdia, which has its headquarters on the hill where the funicular operates. The other fatalities were three Britons, two South Koreans, two Canadians, an American, a Ukrainian, a Swiss national, and a French national.

Among the injured, five were Portuguese while the other 18 were foreigners. A three-year-old child was among the injured.

== Investigation ==
Portugal's Office for the Prevention and Investigation of Accidents in Civil Aviation and Rail (GPIAAF) said it would launch an investigation into the crash. Carris said that apart from the maintenance work in 2024, regular monthly and weekly checks had been done and that it would open its own investigation. It also said it was "very sorry about what happened".

A preliminary report by the GPIAAF indicated that, after travelling only about 6 m (20 ft), the connecting cable between the two cabins failed at its attachment point to the upper car. Investigators determined that the vehicle's speed could not be reduced despite the pneumatic and hand brakes being applied immediately by the brakeman once they lost the balancing force of the cable. The report noted that, while a visual inspection of the scheduled cable was performed on the morning of the accident and did not show any issues, it was not possible to see the specific failure point without taking apart the cable. It also reported that the cable section was approximately 337 days into its expected 600-day service period at the time of the failure.

The GPIAAF released the initial results of its inquiry on 20 October 2025. It found that the cable involved in the derailment "did not comply with the specifications in force at the CCFL [Lisbon’s transport operator] to be used for the Gloria tram" and that no testing or oversight by Carris was done on the cable prior to its installation. It added that activation of the braking system failed to stop the derailment. The GPIAAF recommended that Lisbon's funiculars remain closed until they could be declared fully safe, adding that it was necessary to determine whether braking systems in the funicular cars were "capable of immobilising the cabins in the event of a cable break". Five instances when the maintenance program referred to "non-existent, inapplicable or outdated standards" were also noted.

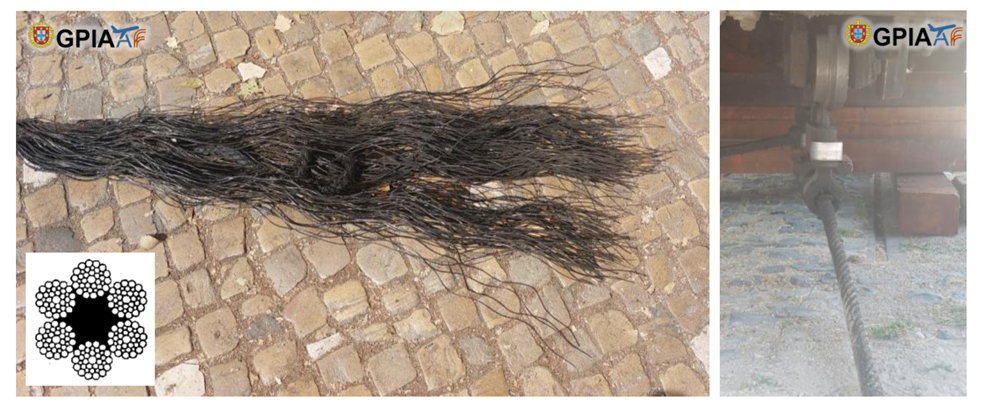
Cable broken during the derailment. Bottom left: cross section. Right: unbroken cable inserted into the trambolho.

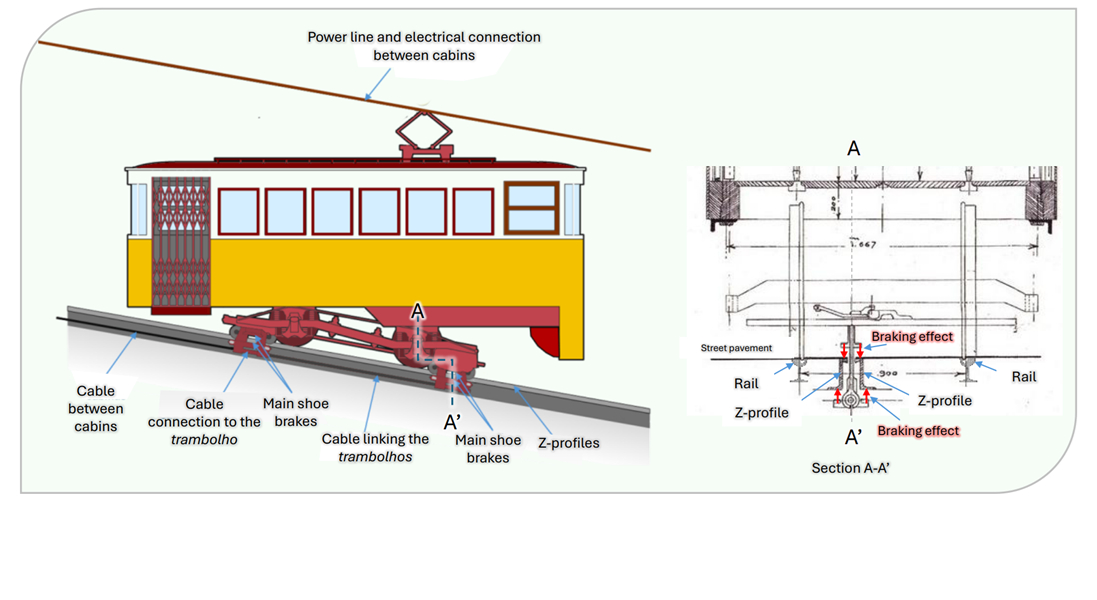
Diagram of the main brake. The brake pads are gripping the Z-profile in the ground.

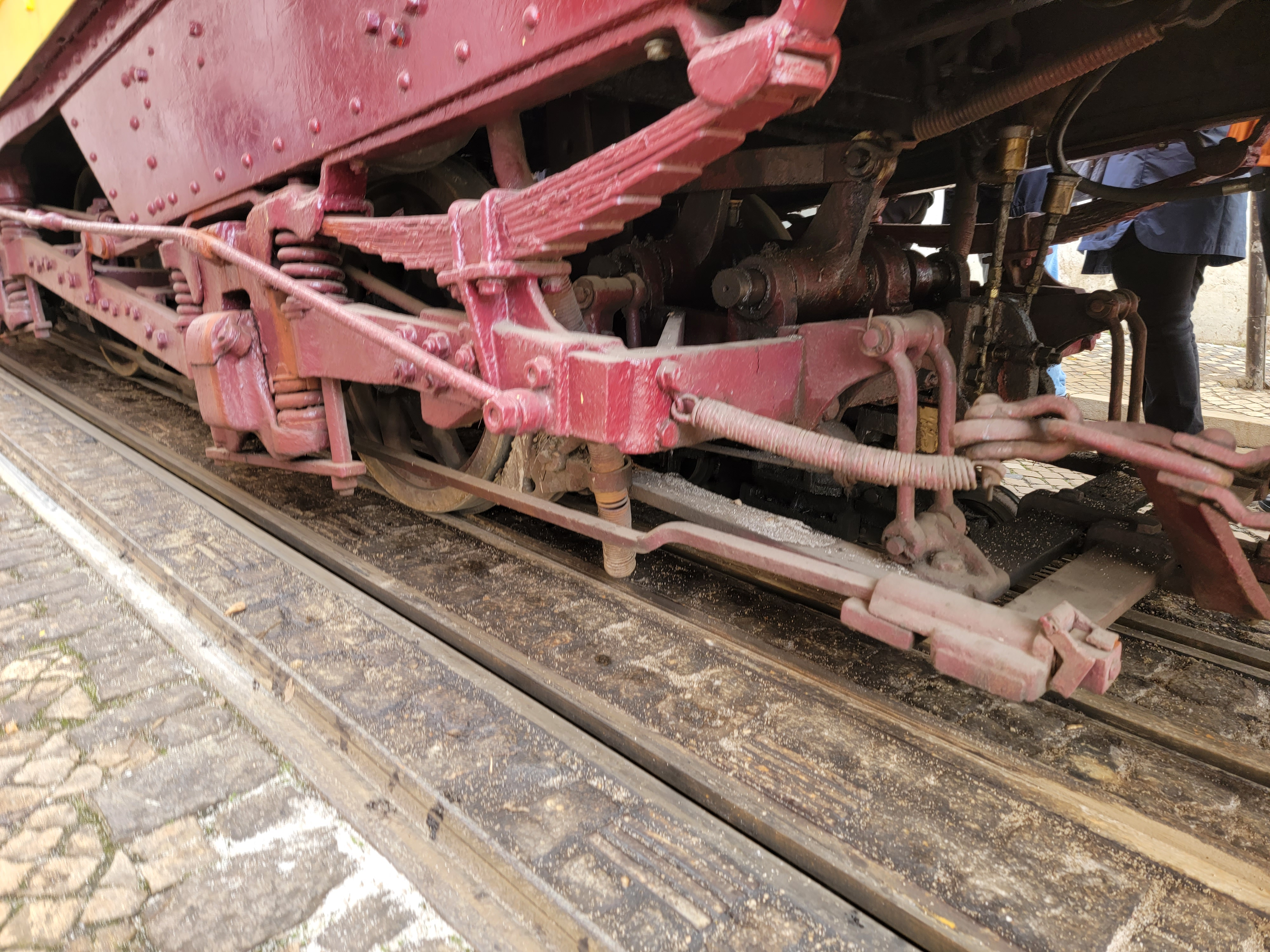
A brake shoe of the manual brake is visible to the right of the wheel.

== Response ==
Following the derailment, the Lisbon municipal council formed a technical team of Carris engineers, university experts, Ordem dos Engenheiros and the National Civil Engineering Laboratory (LNEC) to establish a new device for safety and evaluate when the funiculator may safely resume its service.

All funicular services in the city were suspended by the Lisbon Municipal Chamber which also directed an immediate inspection of all other trams and funiculars. The Polícia Judiciária announced the creation of a telephone line and an email to be used by families and close friends of the victims as well as official entities for information about the incident. Debris from the crash site was cleared from 4 to 5 September.

A national day of mourning was observed in Portugal on 4 September while Lisbon observed three days of municipal mourning. A Mass in memory of the victims was held at the nearby Igreja de São Domingos in Lisbon on the afternoon of 4 September, and was attended by Portuguese president Marcelo Rebelo de Sousa, prime minister Luís Montenegro and Lisbon mayor Carlos Moedas. Another memorial was held at the Igreja de São Roque in Lisbon on 5 September. The European Parliament flew flags at half mast. President Rebelo de Sousa, the European Commission, and Spain made statements in response to the accident.

The Lisbon City Council assembled a team of Carris technicians and experts from universities, Order of Engineers, and the National Laboratory for Civil Engineering to develop new safety mechanisms and determine if and when the railway is safe to reopen.
