= Piché: The Landing of a Man =

- Film poster
- French: Piché, entre ciel et terre
- Directed by: Sylvain Archambault
- Written by: Ian Lauzon
- Produced by: André Dupuy
- Starring: Michel Côté; Maxime Le Flaguais; Normand D'Amour; Sophie Prégent; Isabelle Guérard
- Cinematography: Ronald Plante
- Edited by: Yvann Thibaudeau
- Music by: Michel Corriveau
- Production companies: TVA Films; PixCom Productions
- Distributed by: Theatrical Entertainment
- Release date: July 7, 2010
- Running time: 107 minutes
- Country: Canada
- Language: French

Piché: The Landing of a Man (French: Piché, entre ciel et terre) is a Canadian drama film, directed by Sylvain Archambault and released in 2010. The film is based on the true story of Robert Piché, an airline pilot who successfully landed Air Transat Flight 236 in the Azores after the plane lost engine power mid-air.

The film stars Michel Côté as Piché, with Côté's real-life son Maxime Le Flaguais playing the younger Piché in flashbacks. The cast also includes Normand D'Amour, Sophie Prégent, Sarah-Jeanne Labrosse and Isabelle Guérard.

The film received two Genie Award nominations at the 31st Genie Awards, for Best Cinematography (Ronald Plante) and Best Editing (Yvann Thibaudeau).
