= Maxime Le Flaguais =

Canadian actor

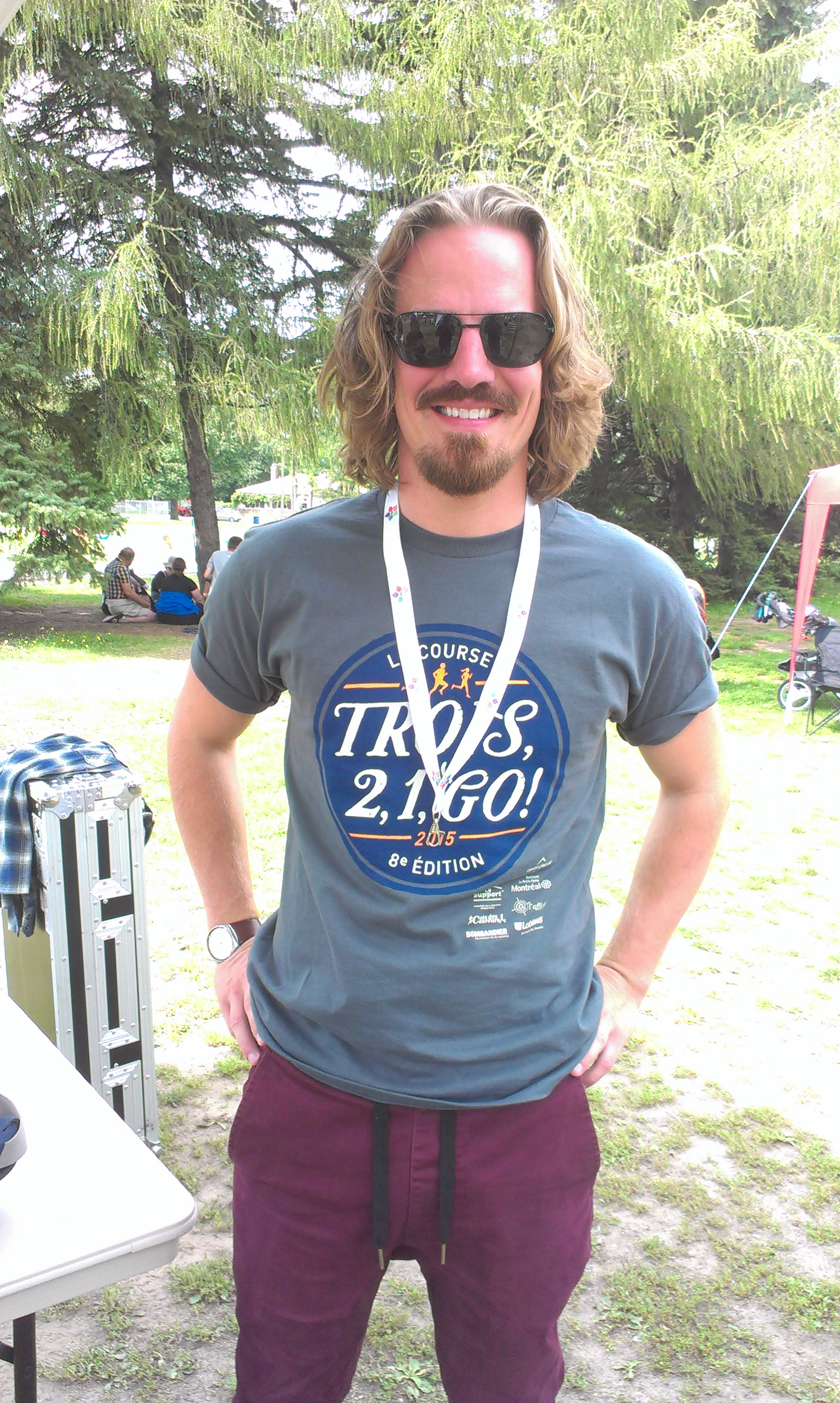
- Le Flaguais at Maisonneuve Park
- Born: Maxime Côté; 1982 (age 43–44); Quebec City, Quebec, Canada
- Occupation: Actor
- Years active: 2005–present
- Partner: Caroline Dhavernas (2016–present)
- Children: Françoise Côté
- Parents: Michel Côté (father); Véronique Le Flaguais (mother)

Maxime Le Flaguais is the stage name of Maxime Côté (born 1982), a Canadian actor known for his leading television role as Alexis Labranche in the 2016-21 drama series Les Pays d'en haut and his performance in the 2022 film Rodeo (Rodéo).

== Career ==
The son of actors Michel Côté and Véronique Le Flaguais, he had a number of early acting roles as Maxime Côté before opting in 2010 to use his mother's surname professionally, in a bid to establish his career on his own without the baggage of being judged against his father's status as one of Quebec's most famous actors. His first role credited as Maxime Le Flaguais was in the film Piché: The Landing of a Man (Piché, entre ciel et terre) as the young Robert Piché, with his father playing Piché as an adult.

He received a Canadian Screen Award nomination for Best Lead Performance in a Film at the 11th Canadian Screen Awards in 2023, for his performance in Rodeo.

He has also been an occasional songwriting collaborator with singer-songwriter Beyries, including on the songs "J'aurai cent ans" and "Nous sommes". They received a SOCAN Songwriting Prize nomination in 2017 for "J'aurai cent ans", and Le Flaguais codirected the music video for "Nous sommes".

In 2022 he directed his first narrative short film, Ourobouros.

In 2026 Le Flaguais and singer-songwriter Alexandre "Bernhari" Leclerc opened La Maison des Bozos, a performance venue in Montreal named for a song by Félix Leclerc.

== Personal life ==
He is in a relationship with actress Caroline Dhavernas. Their first daughter, Françoise, was born in September 2018.

== Filmography ==
=== Film ===
Year	Title	Role	Notes
2004	C.R.A.Z.Y.	Patrick	
2004	Les Boys IV	Recruit at hockey draft	
2007	Nitro	Max's friend	
2007	Borderline	Sébastien Vandal	
2007	Dans une galaxie près de chez vous 2	Archer	
2007	Babine	Dièse	
2008	Le Banquet	Marcel	
2008	Heat Wave (Les Grandes Chaleurs)	Jérémie	
2010	Piché: The Landing of a Man (Piché, entre ciel et terre)	Young Robert Piché	
2014	Tentacules 8, le retour de la chose		
2014	Turn Off Before Living		
2015	The Sands (Plage de sable)		
2021	Monsieur Cachemire	Chauffeur	
2022	Rodeo (Rodéo)	Serge	
2023	Katak: The Brave Beluga (Katak, le brave béluga)	Old Katak	Voice role; French version
2024	Sisters and Neighbors! (Nos belles-sœurs)	Johnny	

=== Television ===
Year	Title	Role	Notes
2005	L'Auberge du chien noir	Client	
2005	Le Petit Monde de Laura Cadieux	Delivery man	
2005	Un tueur si proche	Michel Chénier	
2006	Casino	Delivery man	
2007	Pendant ce temps, devant la télé	Steve	
2007-2010	La Galère	Luc	
2009-2013	Trauma	Éric Lanoue	
2011	Malenfant	Benoit Lamontagne	
2012	Manigances	Guillaume Paradis	
2013	30 vies	Mathieu Brousseau	
2015	Mon ex à moi	Étienne Girard	
2015	Le rêve de Champlain	Samuel de Champlain	
2016-2021	Les Pays d'en haut	Alexis Labranche	
2017	Vu du pont	Marco	
2019	Blood & Treasure	Baron	One episode
