= Love Crazy (1991 film) =

- French: Amoureux fou
- Directed by: Robert Ménard
- Written by: Claire Wojas
- Produced by: Robert Ménard; Claude Bonin
- Starring: Rémy Girard; Nathalie Gascon; Jean Rochefort; Danielle Proulx
- Cinematography: Pierre Mignot
- Edited by: Michel Arcand
- Music by: Marie Bernard
- Release date: 1991 (Canada)
- Running time: 100 minutes
- Country: Canada
- Language: French

Love Crazy (French: Amoureux fou), also released as Madly in Love in some markets, is a Canadian romantic comedy film, directed by Robert Ménard and released in 1991.

== Synopsis ==
A 40-year-old ad man, Rémy (Rémy Girard), meets a former lover, Sarah (Nathalie Gascon), and finds himself head-over-heels in love with her all over again. Sarah's husband (Jean Rochefort) is philosophical and figures she will soon tire of the affair. However, Rémy's wife's (Danielle Proulx) reaction is somewhat different. She throws him out, begs him to come back, takes a lover of her own and then slumps into a deep depression.

== Cast ==
- Rémy Girard as Rémy
- Jean Rochefort as Rudolph
- Nathalie Gascon as Sarah
- Danielle Proulx as Judith
- Jessica Barker as Corinne
- Gilles Renaud as Rick
- Caroline St-Onge as Etudiante
- Jocelyn Bérubé as Préposé au stationnement
- Geneviève L'Allier-Matteau as Zira
- Jean-Louis Millette as Gérant de l'immeuble

== Awards ==
The film garnered six Genie Award nominations at the 12th Genie Awards in 1991:

- Best Actor: Rémy Girard, Jean Rochefort
- Best Supporting Actress: Danielle Proulx
- Best Original Screenplay: Claire Wojas
- Best Original Score: Marie Bernard
- Best Original Song: Rémy Girard and Claire Wojas, "C'est plus fort que nous"

Girard and Proulx won their awards.
