= Cruising Bar =

1989 film by Robert Ménard

- Directed by: Robert Ménard
- Written by: Michel Côté; Robert Ménard; Claire Wojas
- Starring: Michel Côté; Louise Marleau; Véronique Le Flaguais
- Cinematography: Pierre Mignot
- Edited by: Michel Arcand
- Music by: Richard Grégoire
- Distributed by: Malofilm
- Release date: 1989
- Running time: 96 minutes
- Country: Canada
- Language: French
- Box office: C$3.36 million (Canada)

Cruising Bar is a 1989 Canadian comedy film, directed by Robert Ménard. The film stars Michel Côté as four separate characters – Serge, a shy nerd; Patrice, a drug-addicted film and television stuntman; Jean-Jacques, a pompous yuppie; and Gérard, an unhappily married man – who are each out on Saturday night hoping to hook up with a woman.

The film's cast also includes Louise Marleau, Geneviève Rioux, Véronique Le Flaguais, Pauline Lapointe, Marthe Turgeon, Linda Sorgini, Jean-Pierre Bergeron and Tony Nardi.

The film was highly successful in Quebec, setting the province's then-record gross box office for its first week in theatres, and later reaching the highest box office ever received in the province by a homegrown film with a gross of C$3.36 million in Canada. It was not Quebec's most successful film of the year overall; although its box office in Quebec exceeded that of Denys Arcand's Jesus of Montreal, the Arcand film was more successful in English Canada and internationally.

The film received three Genie Award nominations at the 11th Genie Awards in 1990: Best Actor (Côté), Best Cinematography (Pierre Mignot) and Best Costume Design (Louise Labrecque). It did not win any of those awards, but Jacques Lafleur and Pierre Saindon were presented with a Special Achievement Genie for Make-Up.

A sequel film, Cruising Bar 2, was released in 2008.
