= Clinical Psychological Science =

- Discipline: Psychology
- Language: English
- Edited by: Jennifer Tackett

Publication details
- History: 2013–present
- Publisher: SAGE Publications
- Frequency: Bi-monthly

Standard abbreviations
- ISO 4: Clin. Psychol. Sci.

Indexing
- ISSN: 2167-7026 (print); 2167-7034 (web)
- LCCN: 2012202841
- OCLC no.: 793286981

Links
- Journal homepage; Online access; Online archive

Clinical Psychological Science is a peer-reviewed academic journal covering clinical psychology. It is published by SAGE Publications on behalf of the Association for Psychological Science. The journal was established in 2013 as a quarterly, moving to bimonthly in 2014. The founding editor-in-chief was Alan E. Kazdin (Yale University), who was succeeded as editor-in-chief by Scott O. Lilienfeld (Emory University). The current editor-in-chief is Jennifer Tackett.

== Abstracting and indexing ==
The journal is abstracted and indexed in:

- PsycINFO
- Scopus
