= Les Pays d'en haut =

Canadian television drama series

- Genre: historical drama, soap opera
- Created by: Gilles Desjardins
- Written by: Gilles Desjardins
- Starring: Vincent Leclerc; Sarah-Jeanne Labrosse; Maxime Le Flaguais
- Country of origin: Canada
- No. of seasons: 6
- No. of episodes: 52

Original release
- Network: Radio-Canada
- Release: January 11, 2016 – February 8, 2021

Les Pays d'en haut (The Upper Countries) is a French-language Canadian television drama series, which aired on Ici Radio-Canada Télé from 2016 to 2021. The second television adaptation of Claude-Henri Grignon's 1933 novel Un Homme et son péché following the long-running Les Belles Histoires des pays d'en haut in the 1950s and 1960s, the series is a historical drama set in the Laurentides region of Quebec in the 1880s.

The series centres on Séraphin Poudrier (Vincent Leclerc), the mayor of the village of Sainte-Adèle, and his wife Donalda Laloge (Sarah-Jeanne Labrosse); Donalda, who was married off to Séraphin as payment for a family debt but does not love him, is also having an affair with Alexis Labranche (Maxime Le Flaguais). Antoine Labelle (Antoine Bertrand), the Roman Catholic priest who led the settlement of the Laurentians, is also a principal character.

As in the original series, it delves into the broader community and dramatizes the historical settlement of the region; according to series creator Gilles Desjardins, his interest in remaking the series stemmed from a desire to explore aspects of the story that Grignon could not have depicted on television in his era, including more explicit and graphic sexuality and exploration of the darker aspects of the region's history, such as social unrest and rebellion against the power of the Catholic church. For instance, one storyline centred on a lesbian relationship between Donatienne (Kim Despatis) and Pâquerette (Romane Denis), who eventually left to escape the moral judgement of the community.

Other members of the cast included Roger Léger, Julie LeBreton, Paul Doucet, Michel Charette, Pierre Mailloux, Madeleine Péloquin, Marie-Ève Milot, Rémi-Pierre Paquin, Anne-Élisabeth Bossé, Mario Jean, Jacques Allard, David La Haye, David Boutin, Claude Despins and Julien Poulin.

== Distribution ==
The series aired in four seasons of ten episodes each, and two seasons of six episodes each.

In 2021, the series was added to the international online streaming service Walter Presents, under the title True North.

== Awards ==
The series won the Gémeaux Award for Best Dramatic Series, Short Run (saisonnière) in 2016 for the first season. It was a nominee in the same category in 2017 for the second season, in 2019 for the fourth season and in 2021 for the final season.

Leclerc won the Gémeaux for Best Actor in a Short Run Drama Series in 2016, and was nominated in the same category for each of the show's followup seasons.

At the 2017 awards Labrosse was nominated for Best Actress in a Short Run Drama Series, Charette and Paquin were nominated for Best Supporting Actor in a Short Run Drama Series, and Péloquin was nominated for Best Supporting Actress in a Short Run Drama Series. Charette was nominated for Best Supporting Actor in a Short Run Drama Series in 2018; in 2019 Bertrand was nominated for Best Supporting Actor in a Short Run Drama Series and Denis was nominated for Best Supporting Actress in a Short Run Drama Series; in 2021 La Haye was nominated for Best Supporting Actor in a Short Run Drama Series.
