= Diane Cailhier =

Canadian filmmaker (1947–2020)

- Born: 1947; Salaberry-de-Valleyfield, Quebec, Canada
- Died: 5 February 2020 (aged 73); Magog, Quebec, Canada
- Occupation: Director

Diane Cailhier (1947 – 5 February 2020) was a Canadian filmmaker and director. She was married to fellow film director Alain Chartrand.

== Biography ==
Cailhier was born in 1947 in Salaberry-de-Valleyfield. Her father, Antonin Cailhier, was a professor at the Séminaire de Valleyfield. Her mother, Marguerite Cailhier, was the first female graduate in literary science at Pensionnat de Valleyfield.

Cailhier attended primary and secondary school at Pensionnat de Valleyfield, and did her collegiate studies at Collège Jesus-Marie d’Outremont. She obtained a Laureat in piano from École de musique Vincent-d'Indy in 1964 and studied at École des Beaux-Arts de Montréal from 1967 to 1969. Cailhier then earned a master's degree in literary art at Université de Montréal in 1975.

Her first dramatic texts were L'Atelier and Studio d'études in 1970 and 1971, which were aired on Radio-Canada and directed by Robert Blondin. She also researched and adapted novels for the program Lectures de chevet. From 1972 to 1975, Cailhier was a researcher and conducted interviews for the radio program Gens de mon pays, produced by Blondin and Jean Boisvert.

Cailhier's first feature film, La piastre, was written in 1974 and released in 1976 with her husband Alain Chartrand, shortly after the birth of their daughter, Marie.

A film professor at Collège Jean-de-Brébeuf from 1976 to 1977, Cailhier later taught at Cégep de Sherbrooke until 1986. During this time, she continued producing films, and took residence at Sainte-Catherine-de-Hatley. She gave documentary writing lessons at the Institut de l’image et du son and the Association québécoise des auteurs dramatiques. Her career in film took off in the 1980s with the writing of documentaries, TV shows, short films, and feature films.

Cailhier died on 5 February 2020 at the age of 73.

== Filmography ==
- Back to the Land (La Piastre) - 1976
- Les Douces - 1980
- Images de L'Estrie - 1980
- L'Estrie en musique - 1981
- Terre et mémoire - 1983
- Friends for Life (Des amis pour la vie) - 1988
- A Man of His Word (Un homme de parole) - 1991
- School's Out (Une nuit à l'école) - 1991
- Les intrépides - 1991
- Anna's Garden (Le jardin d'Anna) - 1992
- Les Grands Procès - 1995
- My Life Is a River (Une vie comme rivière) - 1996
- Deux frères - 1999
- Chartrand et Simonne - 1999
- The Outlander (Le Survenant) - 2005
- Lac Mystère - 2013
