= Michel Côté (actor) =

Canadian actor (1950–2023)

Michel Côté OC CQ MSC
- Born: June 25, 1950; Alma, Quebec, Canada
- Died: May 29, 2023 (aged 72)
- Education: National Theatre School of Canada
- Occupation: Actor
- Spouse: Véronique Le Flaguais
- Children: Charles Côté; Maxime Le Flaguais

Michel Côté OC CQ MSC (June 25, 1950 – May 29, 2023) was a Canadian actor from Quebec. He is known for his performances in the films Cruising Bar, Life After Love (La vie après l'amour) and C.R.A.Z.Y., the theatrical show Broue and the television series Omertà.

== Background ==
Born in Alma, Quebec, he did not originally aspire to become an actor, but took up the profession after starting to take amateur theatre roles as part of his university studies, and later enrolled at the National Theatre School of Canada.

== Career ==
Côté taught introductory acting and improvisation at the Option Théâtre in Sainte-Thérèse until 1977. He subsequently cofounded a small theatre, Voyagements. In 1979, Côté began performing in the play Broue at the theatre; the play was intended to have a one-month run, but ended up being staged in many cities across Canada, and Côté continued to perform in all of the more than 2,000 performances that had happened by 2008. Côté, Marc Messier and Marcel Gauthier performed Broue for nearly 40 years, with Côté's last performance occurring in 2017. In order to reduce costs, the actors performed all the roles themselves.

Côté played the lead role in the film Cruising Bar, and was nominated for a Genie Award for Best Performance by an Actor in a Leading Role in 1990. He also played the lead role in the film C.R.A.Z.Y., and won a Genie in the same category for this film in 2005. In 2008, he revived his Cruising Bar characters in the sequel film Cruising Bar 2, for which he received a Jutra Award nomination for Best Actor at the 11th Jutra Awards,

In 2009, Côté played a lead role in the film Father and Guns (De père en flic), which took in $10.5 million at the box office in Quebec. In 2010, he appeared as pilot Robert Piché in the film Piché: The Landing of a Man (Piché, entre ciel et terre), and in 2011 he starred as Roger Gendron in A Sense of Humour (Le sens de l'humour).

Côté was appointed Officer of the Order of Canada (OC) in the 2023 Canadian honours, "for his distinguished career as one of Quebec's most prominent actors on stage, on television and in film."

In 2025, the book Michel Côté et nous was published by Éditions de l'Homme. This work, by Pierre Gince and Maxime le Flaguais, brings together about fifty testimonies from those close to Michel Côté.

== Personal life ==
Côté was married to French actress Véronique Le Flaguais. They had two sons Charles and Maxime. The latter is also an actor. Côté died on 29 May 2023, at the age of 72.

== Filmography ==
=== Film ===
Year	Title	Role	Notes
1978	Christmas Lace	The Thief	
1982	Bleue Brume		
1983	Au clair de la lune	François	
1986	Exit	Simon	
1986	Transit	Laurent	
1986	La Fuite		
1988	You're Beautiful, Jeanne (T'es belle Jeanne)	Bert	
1989	In the Belly of the Dragon (Dans le ventre du dragon)	Bozo	
1989	Cruising Bar	Serge, Patrice, Jean-Jacques, Gérard	
1989	The Scorpio Factor	SWAT Team	
1990	Moody Beach	Simon	
1991	The Horse Trader's Daughter (La Fille du maquignon)		
1994	The Wind from Wyoming (Le Vent du Wyoming)	Marcel	
1995	Black List (Liste noire)	Jacques Savard	
1996	Mistaken Identity (Erreur sur la personne)	Charles Renard	
2000	Life After Love (La vie après l'amour)	Gilles	
2003	Evil Words (Sur le seuil)	Paul Lacasse	
2004	The Last Tunnel (Le Dernier tunnel)	Marcel Talon	
2005	C.R.A.Z.Y.	Gervais Beaulieu	
2007	My Daughter, My Angel (Ma fille, mon ange)	Germain Dagenais	
2008	Cruising Bar 2	Serge, Patrice, Jean-Jacques, Gérard	
2009	Father and Guns (De père en flic)	Jacques Laroche	
2010	Piché: The Landing of a Man (Piché, entre ciel et terre)	Robert Piché	
2011	A Sense of Humour (Le sens de l'humour)	Roger Gendron	
2014	The Masters of Suspense (Les Maîtres du suspense)	Hubert Wolfe	
2016	My Friend Dino (Mon ami Dino)	Michel Côté	
2017	Father and Guns 2 (De père en flic 2)	Jacques Laroche	

=== Television ===
Year	Title	Role	Notes
1975-76	La Petite Patrie	Maurice Labonté	Two episodes
1977	The Newcomers	Nicolas de Lugny	One episode
1977	Le Pont	Joseph Fortier	
1978	Du tac au tac	M. Dubuc	One episode
1979-2018	Bye Bye	Six episodes	
1980	Les Brillant	Désiré Lamarre	Three episodes
1981	Les Girouettes	Léon Gingras	
1982	Vaut mieux en rire		
1992	Miss Moscou		TV movie
1992	Montréal ville ouverte	Pacifique Plante	13 episodes
1994-2009	La Petite Vie	Jean-Louis Pichette	Nine episodes
1996-1999	Omerta	Pierre Gauthier	30 episodes
2001	Si la tendance se maintient	Alain Gagnon	Three episodes
2004	Et Dieu créa... Laflaque	Edmond	
2012	En audition avec Simon	Himself	One episode
2014	Les Pêcheurs	Himself	One episode
2014-15	La théorie du K.O.	Carol Hébert	25 episodes
