= Michel Chartrand =

Canadian trade union leader (1916–2010)

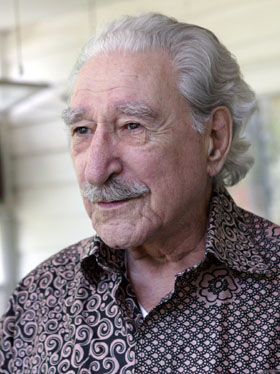
- Chartrand in 2007
- Born: 20 December 1916; Outremont, Quebec, Canada
- Died: 12 April 2010 (aged 93); Montérégie, Quebec, Canada
- Occupation: Trade unionist
- Spouse: Simonne Monet-Chartrand (m. 1942)
- Children: Alain Chartrand

Michel Chartrand (French pronunciation: [miʃɛl ʃaʁtʁɑ̃]; 20 December 1916 – 12 April 2010) was a Canadian trade union leader from Quebec.

Born in Outremont and trained as a typography and print worker, Chartrand became involved in union activism in the 1940s. During the Grande Noirceur, he took part in major strike actions such as the Asbestos strike in 1949, the Louiseville Strike in 1952 and the Murdochville strike in 1957. In 1968, he became president of the Montreal central council of the Confédération des syndicats nationaux (CSN). In 1970, during the October crisis, he was arrested without a warrant and put in jail for four months. He was president of the CSN Montreal central council until 1978.

During the 1980s, he took action for the rights of injured workers; he created the Fondation pour l’aide aux travailleuses et travailleurs accidentés (FATA) in 1984. He promoted progressive values and syndicalism in the media until the end of his life. He endorsed Québec solidaire.

Chartrand is considered to have been a promoter of socialism, a severe critic of capitalism, and a leading figure of syndicalism in Quebec. He was married to feminist writer and union activist Simonne Monet-Chartrand.

== Early life and education ==
Born on 20 December 1916 in the Montreal neighbourhood of Outremont, he studied at Collège Jean-de-Brébeuf secondary school and collège Sainte-Thérèse. In 1933, he trained to be a Trappist monk, but left after two years and worked with a Roman Catholic Church youth movement. In the 1939 Quebec election, he campaigned for the Action libérale nationale (ALN) party. In 1940, he enrolled in a history course at the Université de Montréal taught by Lionel Groulx, a Quebec nationalist Roman Catholic priest.

Chartrand is reported to have joined the Canadian Officer Training Corps in 1941 following the outbreak of World War II in September 1939. This program, conducted across Canada, allowed university students to be credited with military service while continuing their studies without being posted to active duty. Chartrand protested that the Canadian Army documents were only in the English language and returned to the Trappists' monastery in the village of Oka, Quebec.

In a 1994 interview, Suzette Rouleau, Pierre Trudeau's sister, described engaging in a fist fight with Chartrand, to prevent him bullying her younger brother, when they were all teenagers.

== Opponent of conscription ==
Following the federal government's 1942 announcement of a national plebiscite on military conscription, Michel Chartrand became an outspoken opponent and joined the Bloc populaire canadien movement to campaign against conscription.

In February 1942, he was married to Simonne Monet by Lionel Groulx at the Notre-Dame Basilica. By the time the Parliament of Canada put conscription in place in November 1944, Chartrand was the father of three children.

In the 1945 federal election, he was the Bloc Populaire candidate in the Chambly-Rouville riding. He lost in a landslide to his Liberal Party of Canada opponent.

== Seeking elected office ==
In 1948, his fifth child was born, and the following year he went to the Asbestos Region to participate in the Asbestos strike by local mine workers. In 1950, he became active with the executive committee of the Catholic Workers Confederation of Canada (CTCC). Involved with a number of union operations, in 1953 Chartrand became a salaried member of the union's executive committee. After internal disputes, he was fired from his job. However, after appealing the decision, a tribunal under Pierre Trudeau reinstated him.

In 1954, Chartrand stood for election to the post of secretary-general of the union but was defeated by Jean Marchand. In 1956, he joined the Cooperative Commonwealth Federation (CCF), a social democratic federal political party headed in Quebec by Thérèse Casgrain. Chartrand was appointed a Quebec delegate to the party's convention in Winnipeg, Manitoba. As a result, a Quebec branch of the party was organized under the name Parti social démocratique du Québec. Chartrand was the party's candidate in the Chambly riding in the 1956 provincial election, but was badly defeated. His union duties involved numerous high-profile strikes, and he was seen by some as a future leader of the movement and was leader of the party from 1957 until 1960.

Chartrand ran for the CCF in the Longueuil district in the 1953 and 1957 federal elections. He finished third with 11.1% and 5.4% of the vote. He also ran for the same party in the Lapointe district (town of Arvida, Quebec) in the 1958 federal election. Despite a strong union base, he nevertheless finished third with 24.3% of the vote. In 1959, Chartrand tried again for public office, running in a Quebec provincial by-election in Lac Saint-Jean, Quebec for the Social Democratic Party, but once again finished third with 21.8% of the vote. His frustration became evident through his increasingly extremist statements, and in 1959, the union forced him to resign from its executive committee. He was then hired to work at the printing office of the Parti social-démocratique, and was again a delegate to the CCF's convention in Winnipeg.

== Peace advocacy and socialism ==
In 1960, the Confederation of Catholic Workers of Canada changed its name to the Confédération des syndicats nationaux (CSN). Chartrand took part in the peace movement, participating in demonstrations and marches against nuclear proliferation and other causes. An admirer of the communist revolution in Cuba and its leader Fidel Castro, in 1963 Chartrand accompanied a group on a month-long visit to Cuba. On his return to Quebec, he called Cuba "a paradise" and held it out as a symbol of what Quebec should become. Chartrand then helped found the Parti socialiste du Québec (Socialist Party of Quebec), and, as its president, soon began supporting the Quebec sovereignty movement, the Rassemblement pour l'indépendance nationale (RIN).

== Involvement for Quebec independence ==
In 1968, Michel Chartrand was elected president of the Montreal Central Council of the Confédération des syndicats nationaux, serving in that position until 1978. By the end of the 1960s, his views became more resolved. As a member of the Quebec Independence movement, Chartrand staunchly supported the Front de libération du Québec (FLQ).

During the October Crisis, when asked by a reporter about the ordeal the family of kidnapped British trade commissioner James Cross was being put through, Chartrand stated: "I have no more sympathy for Mrs. Cross than for the wives of thousands of men without jobs in Quebec at the present time." Even after the murder of Quebec vice-premier Pierre Laporte, Chartrand remained steadfast in his beliefs, and proved it by bailing FLQ leader Charles Gagnon out of jail, paying nearly three thousand dollars of his own money. On 15 October 1975, five years after the October Crisis, FLQ and Front de rassemblement d'action populaire members and supporters met at the Paul-Sauvé Centre in Montreal where Michel Chartrand addressed the crowd.

In the 1998 Quebec election, he again ran for political office. He represented the Rassemblement pour l'alternative progressiste (now Québec solidaire) against Lucien Bouchard in Jonquière, finishing third with 14 per cent of the votes.

== In film ==
Michel Chartrand and Simonne Monet's lives were the subject of a television mini-series entitled Chartrand et Simonne. Chartrand was also the subject of a 1991 National Film Board of Canada documentary Un homme de parole. Earlier, in 1994, Michel Chartrand appeared besides former FLQ members Charles Gagnon and Pierre Vallieres, in a documentary directed by Jean Daniel Lafond, La liberté en colère.

He also had a small acting role in the 1970 comedy film Two Women in Gold (Deux femmes en or).

== Death ==
Chartrand died on 12 April 2010 from kidney cancer. The Parc régional de Longueuil was renamed Parc Michel-Chartrand by the city of Longueuil in June 2010.

== Electoral record ==
1998 Quebec general election: Jonquière
Party	Candidate	Votes	%	±%
Parti Québécois	Lucien Bouchard	20,475	60.48	-34.34
Liberal	Guylaine Caron	6,552	19.35	–
Rassemblement pour l'alternative progressiste	Michel Chartrand	5,023	14.84	–
Action démocratique	Hélène Vigneault	1,686	4.98	–
Natural Law	Sylvain Bergeron	120	0.35	-0.50
Total valid votes		33,856	99.12	+0.40
Total rejected, unmarked, and declined ballots		302	0.88	-0.40
Turnout		34,158	76.91	+15.92
Eligible voters		44,415		

Quebec provincial by-election, 1959: Lac Saint-Jean
Party	Candidate	Votes	%	±%
Union Nationale	Jean-Paul Levasseur	8,469	56.16	+12.81
Independent	Raymond Lapointe	3,324	22.04	–
Social Democratic	Michel Chartrand	3,286	21.79	–
Total valid votes		15,079	98.40	-1.51
Total rejected ballots		341	2.21	+1.51
Turnout		15,420	62.10	-29.65
Electors on the lists		24,831	–	

1958 Canadian federal election: Lapointe
Party	Candidate	Votes	%	±%
Liberal	Augustin Brassard	12,113	41.74	-10.77
Progressive Conservative	Bernard Wilshire	9,864	33.99	–
Co-operative Commonwealth	Michel Chartrand	7,042	24.27	–
Total valid votes		29,019		

1957 Canadian federal election: Longueuil
Party	Candidate	Votes	%	±%
Liberal	Auguste Vincent	19,314	58.87	-8.71
Progressive Conservative	Pierre Sévigny	10,942	33.35	+13.46
Co-operative Commonwealth	Michel Chartrand	1,768	5.39	-5.71
Independent Conservative	Oliva Bédard	782	2.38	–
Total valid votes		32,806		

1953 Canadian federal election: Longueuil
Party	Candidate	Votes	%
Liberal	Auguste Vincent	16,688	67.58
Progressive Conservative	Georges-Joseph Valade	4,912	19.89
Co-operative Commonwealth	Michel Chartrand	2,742	11.10
Labor–Progressive	Yvonne Bourget	352	1.43
Total valid votes		24,694	

1945 Canadian federal election: Chambly—Rouville
Party	Candidate	Votes	%	±%
Liberal	Roch Pinard	12,723	50.38	-15.03
Independent	Paul Pratt	9,158	36.26	–
Bloc populaire	Michel Chartrand	2,333	9.24	–
Co-operative Commonwealth	Joseph-Charles Patenaude	1,041	4.12	–
Total valid votes		25,255		
