= Robert Ménard (director) =

Canadian film director and screenwriter

Robert Ménard is a Canadian film director and screenwriter. He is most noted for his 1982 film A Day in a Taxi (Une journée en taxi), for which he was a Genie Award nominee for Best Director at the 4th Genie Awards in 1983.

His other films have included Exit, You're Beautiful, Jeanne (T'es belle Jeanne), Cruising Bar, Love Crazy (Amoureux fou), Water Child (L'enfant d'eau), Cruising Bar 2, A Happy Man (Le Bonheur de Pierre) and Stay with Me (Reste avec moi).

He was married to Claire Wojas, his screenwriting collaborator on nearly all of his films, until her death in 2018.
