= Chartrand et Simonne =

2000 Canadian TV mini-series

- Genre: Drama; Biographical
- Written by: Diane Cailhier
- Directed by: Alain Chartrand
- Theme music composer: Jean Corriveau
- Country of origin: Canada
- Original language: French
- No. of seasons: 2
- No. of episodes: 12

Production
- Production locations: Montreal, Quebec, Canada

Original release
- Network: Radio-Canada
- Release: February 2 – March 8, 2000
- Network: Télé-Québec
- Release: October 30 – December 4, 2003

Chartrand et Simonne is a French-Canadian biographical drama television mini-series about social activists Michel Chartrand and Simonne Monet. The series lasted for a total of twelve episodes, with the first six airing in 2000 on Radio-Canada and the remaining six in 2003 on Télé-Québec (re-titled as Simonne et Chartrand). The series was directed by Alain Chartrand, one of the couple's sons.

== Plot ==
The series recounts the life of Michel Chartrand and Simonne Monet, a couple who fought for social change and justice. We witness the battles they face all the while trying to raise a family. From the moment they first meet to Monet's death, decades of activism is outlined, all of which had a significant impact on Quebec society.

== Main cast ==
- Luc Picard as Michel Chartrand
- Geneviève Rioux as Simonne Monet-Chartrand
- Raymond Bouchard as Amédée Monet
- Muriel Dutil as Berthe Monet
- Marie-Lyse Laberge-Forest as Marie Chartrand
- Guillaume Legault as Alain Chartrand
- Normand Bissonnette as Émile Boudreau
- Gabriel Gascon as Louis Chartrand
- Valérie Gervais-Lillo as Madeleine Chartrand
- Karine Poulin as Hélène Chartrand
- Eric Paulhus as Dominique Chartrand
- Annie Charland as Micheline Chartrand
- Françoise Graton as Hélène Patenaude-Chartrand
- Stéphane Demers as Pierre Trudeau
- Patrick Goyette as Gérard Pelletier

== Awards ==
The series won six awards at the 2000 Prix Gémeaux: Best Dramatic Series, Best Direction in a Dramatic Series, Best Lead Actor in a Dramatic Series, Best Set Design, Best Make-up/Hair and Best Costume Design. For its second installment, at the 2004 Prix Gémeaux, Luc Picard again won the award for Best Lead Actor in a Dramatic Series, while Geneviève Rioux won the award for Best Lead Actress in a Dramatic Series.
