= William Reymond =

Independent investigating journalist, writer

William Reymond is a journalist and writer of several investigations about John F. Kennedy: JFK, Autopsy of a State Crime (JFK, Autopsie d'un Crime d'Etat), JFK, The Last Witness (JFK, le Dernier Témoin, with co-author Billie Sol Estes).

He is co-writer (with Yves Simoneau) for movie Assassin's Creed: Lineage that consisted of 3 series filmed as prequel to the video game 'Assassin's Creed II.

== Biography ==
William Reymond lives in Dallas. He is regular contributor for Canal+, French television channel.

== Reviews of selected William Reymond's books ==
=== Dominici not guilty ===
One of William Reymond investigation 'Dominici not guilty' (Dominici non coupable) is about Dominici affair. William Reymond traces a version about Soviet Union' Cold war program to kidnap and kill scientists, who were cooperating with Britain, as if the Soviet intelligence hired murderers in Germany, who as if killed the people, Jack Drummond, together with his wife and 10-year-old daughter, but French government, as if seeking friendship with Soviet Union, and avoiding scandal of its weak state security, silenced the murder, accusing nearby peasants of Dominici family in the crime, who were as if actually innocent.

== Books ==
- Dominici non coupable: les assassins retrouvés [Dominici not guilty: the assassins found], Flammarion, November 1, 1998, 372 p. (ISBN 978-2080685537)
- JFK: autopsie d'un crime d'État [JFK: autopsy of a state crime], Flammarion, January 22, 1999, 492 p. (ISBN 978-2080675064)
- Rouge lavande [Lavender red], Flammarion, May 27, 1999, 267 p. (ISBN 978-2080677815)
- Mémoire de profs : Missions, joies et craintes, les profs parlent [Teachers' memory: Missions, joys and fears, the teachers speak], Flammarion, September 9, 1999, 207 p. (ISBN 978-2080678003)
- Les cigales de Satan [Satan's cicadas], Flammarion, June 13, 2000, 278 p. (ISBN 978-2080679703)
- Mafia S.A.: les secrets du crime organisé [Mafia S.A.: the secrets of organized crime], Flammarion, November 11, 2001, 454 p. (ISBN 978-2080677730)
- Lettre ouverte pour la révision [Open letter for review], Flammarion, May 22, 2003, 290 p. (ISBN 978-2080684615)
- JFK: le dernier témoin [JFK: the last witness], Flammarion, 24 octobre 2003, 400 p. (ISBN 978-2080679406)
- Bush Land (2000–2004), Flammarion, September 4, 2004, 456 p. (ISBN 978-2080678034)
- Coca-Cola : l'enquête interdite [Coca-Cola: the prohibited investigation], Flammarion-Enquête, January 27, 2006, 432 p. (ISBN 978-2290355534 et 2-08-068764-6)
- Toxic: Obésité, malbouffe, maladie : enquête sur les vrais coupables [Toxic: Obesity, junk food, illness: investigation of the real culprits], Flammarion, February 21, 2007, 354 p. (ISBN 978-2290006290)
- Marilyn: le dernier secret [Marilyn: the last secret], Flammarion, February 20, 2008, 368 p. (ISBN 978-2080690616)
- Toxic Food: enquête sur les secrets de la nouvelle malbouffe [Toxic Food: Investigating the Secrets of New Junk Food], Flammarion, 2009, 316p.
