= Manuel Tadros =

Canadian singer, songwriter, actor

Hany Manuel Tadros
- Born: 30 September 1956 (age 69); Cairo, Egypt
- Occupations: Singer; songwriter; actor; comedian
- Spouses: Geneviève Dolan (div. 1991) Émilie Ndejuru (m. 2021)
- Children: 2, including Xavier Dolan

Hany Manuel Tadros (Arabic: مانويل تادرس; born 30 September 1956) is an Egyptian-Canadian singer, songwriter, actor, comedian and voice actor. He currently works and lives in Quebec.

== Early life ==
Tadros was born in Cairo, Egypt to a Christian family. His father, Emmanuel Saadi Tadros, was a Copt, and his mother, Suzette Sawaya, was of Lebanese descent. Tadros's parents immigrated to Quebec when he was ten years old. His father bought him a guitar when he was 12 and he started composing and singing, eventually performing at the Vieux Damas venue in Saint Vincent.

== Career ==
His fame began to grow after he took part in Première chance, a TV program hosted by Fernand Gignac for new talents, in which he sang "Je t'aime, tu sais". Soon after this, he released his first album Manuel Tadros which featured the song "Un trésor de velours" that topped the Quebec charts. He was also known for his song "Isabelle". Tadros also hosted the variety shows Jeunesse and Pop Express between 1982 and 1984 on Télé Métropole.

Toward the end of the 1970s and throughout the 1980s Tadros turned to writing songs for other artists, including the hit tune "C'est zéro" for Julie Masse. He also wrote for Véronic Dicaire, Roch Voisine, Nicole Martin, Patrick Norman and Natasha St-Pier and for shows including Cirque du Soleil's Alegria

At the beginning of the 1990s, Tadros diversified, doing voice-overs for movies and TV series. He acted on stage including in the 2001 play Roméo et Juliette, de la Haine à l'Amour. He also hosted the educational magazine Code d’accès between 1998 and 2000.

Tadros wrote the French versions of the music in Chicago in 2003 (including the French-language musical comedy adaptation of the film) and Nostalgia in 2004. He is the voice of Rodrigo Borgia in the Ubisoft game Assassin's Creed II and its follow-up Assassin's Creed: Brotherhood in addition to the short film Assassin's Creed: Lineage. He has dubbed close to 750 films and series.

== Personal life ==
Tadros is a founding member and administrator of ArtistI, an organization that oversees the payment of royalties to artists.

Diabetic from a very young age, he is known for his involvement as a spokesman for Fondation de la recherche sur le diabète juvénile (FRDJ) for many years.

Tadros was married to Geneviève Dolan, a Québécois public college administrator, with whom he had a son, film director and actor Xavier Dolan. Tadros and Dolan divorced in 1991, when their son was 2 years old. Tadros also has another son from a previous relationship with a woman named Diane.

On 28 August 2021, Tadros married Québécois writer Émilie Ndejuru, with whom he had been in a relationship since 2016.

== Filmography ==
- 1996: Omerta, la loi du silence as Frank Vastelli(TV series)
- 1997: Omerta 2, la loi du silence as Frank Vastelli (TV series)
- 1997: Twist of Fate as Dr. Hassan
- 1998: Pendant ce temps... as a Mafioso
- 1998: Meurtrière par amour (The Girl Next Door) as Carlo (TV)
- 1999: Omertà 3, Le dernier des hommes d'honneur as Frank Vastelli (TV series)
- 1999: Bonanno: A Godfather's Story as Mimi Sebella (TV)
- 2000: La Promesse
- 2001: The Warden as Diaz (TV)
- 2002: Le Dernier Chapitre as Carlos Vasquez (TV series)
- 2002: A Loving Father (Aime ton père) as M. Azouz (film)
- 2002-2005: Watatatow as Luigi Del Vecchio (TV series)
- 2003: How My Mother Gave Birth to Me During Menopause (Comment ma mère accoucha de moi durant sa ménopause) as a Biologist
- 2003: Beyond Borders as a Chechen mobster
- 2005: Life with My Father (La Vie avec mon père) as a doctor
- 2005: Human Trafficking (Trafic d'innocence) as Miguel, a Mexican smuggler (TV series)
- 2008: The American Trap (Le piège américain) as Joseph Valachi
- 2008: Casino as Kia (TV)
- 2009: Assassin's Creed: Lineage as Rodrigo Borgia (short film)
- 2009: I Killed My Mother (J'ai tué ma mère) as a concierge
- 2010: The Bait (L'Appât) as MC
- 2013: Tom at the Farm (Tom à la ferme) as the bartender
- 2016: X-Men: Apocalypse as Clan Akkaba Leader
- 2020: The Sticky Side of Baklava (La Face cachée du baklava)
- 2022: Montreal Girls - Hani
- 2022: Dounia and the Princess of Aleppo (Dounia et la princesse d'Alep)

Video games

- 2009: Assassin's Creed II as Rodrigo Borgia
- 2010: Assassin's Creed: Brotherhood as Rodrigo Borgia

== Theater and musical comedies ==
- 1995: Le Bijou
- 1998: A vos souhaits
- 1998: Jerusalem the Musical
- 2000: Un cadeau du ciel
- 2002: Roméo et Juliette, de la Haine à l'Amour as Prince of Verona
- 2004: Nostalgia
