= The Bait (2010 film) =

2010 film directed by Yves Simoneau

- French: L’Appât
- Directed by: Yves Simoneau
- Written by: Yves Simoneau; William Reymond
- Produced by: Josée Vallée; Yves Simoneau
- Starring: Guy A. Lepage; Rachid Badouri
- Cinematography: Guy Dufaux
- Edited by: Richard Comeau
- Music by: Normand Corbeil
- Production company: Cirrus Communications
- Distributed by: Alliance VivaFilm
- Release date: December 17, 2010
- Running time: 104 minutes
- Country: Canada
- Language: French

The Bait (French: L’Appât) is a 2010 Canadian crime comedy film, directed by Yves Simoneau. The film stars Guy A. Lepage as Prudent Poirier, a bumbling Montreal police officer who witnesses the death of mafia boss Carboni (Michel Perron), and Rachid Badouri as Mohammed Choukroune, a French secret service agent who is sent to Montreal to pose as "Ventura", a new police recruit who is paired with Prudent in an attempt to recover information about Carboni's death. As the mission goes awry, however, the two are forced to uncover a wider conspiracy that implicates their own bosses as well.

The film's cast also includes Serge Dupire, Maxim Roy, Ayisha Issa, Romano Orzari, Marie-Josée Boudreau, Frédérique Pierre, Khadija Assad, Sasha Samar, Gregory Hlady, Manuel Tadros and Sylvie Lemay.

Simoneau's first French-language film since moving into English-language film and television after In the Belly of the Dragon (Dans le ventre du dragon) in 1989, the film entered production in September 2010. Initially intended for release in 2011, it was released to theatres by December 2010 following a rapid "merry-go-round" of production and post-production which Simoneau attributed to his experience working within the quicker turnaround of television films.

The film's soundtrack included a song, "Your Favourite Killer", by Marie-Mai.
