= Assassin's Creed: Brotherhood =

2010 Ubisoft video game

- Developer: Ubisoft Montreal
- Publisher: Ubisoft
- Director: Patrick Plourde
- Producer: Vincent Pontbriand
- Designer: Steven Masters
- Programmer: Stéphane Girard
- Artists: Mohamed Gambouz; Wilson Mui
- Writers: Patrice Désilets; Corey May; Jeffrey Yohalem
- Composer: Jesper Kyd
- Series: Assassin's Creed
- Engine: Anvil
- Platforms: PlayStation 3; Xbox 360; Microsoft Windows; OS X; PlayStation 4; Xbox One; Nintendo Switch
- Release: November 16, 2010: PlayStation 3, Xbox 360; NA: November 16, 2010; AU: November 18, 2010; EU: November 19, 2010 Microsoft Windows; AU: March 17, 2011; EU: March 18, 2011; NA: March 22, 2011 OS X; EU: May 19, 2011; NA: July 13, 2011 PlayStation 4, Xbox One; WW: November 15, 2016 Nintendo Switch; WW: February 17, 2022
- Genres: Action-adventure, stealth
- Modes: Single-player, multiplayer

Assassin's Creed: Brotherhood is a 2010 action-adventure game developed by Ubisoft Montreal and published by Ubisoft. It is the third major installment in the Assassin's Creed series, and the second chapter in the "Ezio Trilogy", as a direct sequel to 2009's Assassin's Creed II. It was released on the PlayStation 3 and Xbox 360 in November 2010, and on Microsoft Windows in March 2011. A remastered version of Brotherhood, along with Assassins's Creed II and Assassin's Creed: Revelations, was released as part of The Ezio Collection compilation for the PlayStation 4 and Xbox One on November 15, 2016, and for the Nintendo Switch on February 17, 2022.

The game's plot is set in a fictional history of real-world events and follows the millennia-old struggle between the Assassins, who fight to preserve peace and free will, and the Templars, who desire peace through control. The framing story is set in the 21st century and features series protagonist Desmond Miles using a machine known as the Animus to relive the memories of his Assassin ancestor, Ezio Auditore da Firenze, and find a way to avert the 2012 apocalypse. The main narrative takes place during the Italian Wars, spanning the years 1500–1507, and continues from the events of Assassin's Creed II, as Ezio takes the fight against the Templars (led by the powerful Borgia family) to Rome, where he attempts to rebuild the Assassin Brotherhood in Italy and liberate the city from the Borgias' control.

Brotherhood features an open world and is played from the third-person perspective, with a primary focus on using Desmond's and Ezio's combat, climbing and stealth abilities to eliminate targets and explore the environment. As Ezio, players can freely explore Rome to advance the narrative, or complete a variety of side missions unrelated to the main storyline. The game introduces a multiplayer component to the series, in which players assume the role of Templars in training. A number of downloadable content (DLC) packs were released to support Brotherhood, including The Da Vinci Disappearance, a story expansion set during the events of the single-player campaign.

Brotherhood received critical acclaim, with praise directed at its setting, new content, gameplay improvements over its predecessor and the new multiplayer mode. The narrative was also positively received, although it was generally seen as inferior to that of Assassin's Creed II. The game won multiple awards including a BAFTA award for Best Action Game. It was also commercially successful, shipping 7.2 million units by May 2011. The final installment in the Ezio Trilogy, Assassin's Creed: Revelations, was released in November 2011.

== Gameplay ==
Assassin's Creed: Brotherhood is an action-adventure, stealth game set in an open world environment and played from a third-person perspective. The game features both single-player and multiplayer modes, a first for the series. For most of the single-player campaign, which is estimated to provide 15+ hours of gameplay, the player controls returning protagonist Ezio Auditore da Firenze from Assassin's Creed II; at predetermined points in the narrative, the player takes control of Desmond Miles, who is reliving Ezio's memories through the Animus in the modern-day. For the first time in the series, Desmond can leave the Animus at almost any given time to explore Monteriggioni, where the Assassins have set up base, and find hidden secrets. Desmond can also access virtual training missions via the Animus, which test the player's skills in combat and free-running.

The series' combat system has been modified in Brotherhood. Striking first and offensive actions are more deadly than in previous games where counter-attacks were the most efficient. Before, this made the player wait until their AI opponents struck, which slowed down the pace of fighting. The AI in this game is thus more aggressive and enemies can attack simultaneously. To dispatch them, Ezio can use melee and ranged weapons at the same time, including his hidden pistol, which could previously not be used in combat. After killing one enemy the player can start an execution streak to dispatch multiple enemies quickly. Ezio can also throw heavy weapons (axes, spears, and swords) at his enemies. The variety of enemies also saw an increase with the introduction of new archetypes such as horsemen, arquebusiers, and papal guards.

Ezio using the BAM system (Brotherhood Assist Move). The ability to recruit NPCs into the Assassin Brotherhood and summon them during fights is one of the new features added in Brotherhood.

The game introduces the titular Brotherhood system, which allows the player, as Ezio, to recruit new Assassin initiates after destroying any of the twelve "Borgia towers" around Rome where Papal troops are stationed, and then rescuing disgruntled citizens from being harassed by city guards. The player can send these Assassin recruits on assignments around Europe or call them for support during missions (if they are not already occupied). Tasking the novice Assassins makes them gain experience, and the player can customize their appearance, skills, and weapon training to some degree by spending the skill points they have earned. Assassins can die on missions, from which they will not return.

In Brotherhood, Ezio gets to master several new gadgets, including Leonardo da Vinci's parachute, which can be used when jumping from tall buildings, as well as poison darts, a faster acting poison, and a crossbow. A series of side missions given by Leonardo allow the player to briefly use his war machines, such as a cannon-equipped Great Kite and a prototype tank, which he was forced to design for the Templars; Ezio must destroy these machines and their designs before more can be created. Other side missions include assassinating Templar agents in Rome, completing challenges for the three ally factions in the game (Courtesans, Thieves, and Mercenaries), and exploring underground locations to find the keys to the treasure of the Followers of Romulus—a secret cult who worship Romulus, the legendary founder of Rome. After reaching certain levels of synchronization, the player can also relive several repressed memories of Ezio's past lover, Cristina Vespucci.

The primary setting of the game is Rome, which has fallen into ruin due to the corrupt rule of the Borgia papacy and the Templars, who have concentrated all the wealth in the Vatican. Similarly to Monteriggioni in Assassin's Creed II, the player can invest in the city, witness its development, and unlock rewards. To renovate a particular area of Rome, the player must first liberate it from Templar influence by destroying the nearest Borgia tower. Doing so unlocks new missions and opportunities. Rome is larger than any of the cities seen in Assassin's Creed II (being roughly three times bigger than Florence) and is divided into five districts: the Vatican (Vaticano), Central (Centro), Trans-Tiber (Trastevere), Country (Campagna) and Antique (Antico) districts. Unlike previous installments, travel between different cities or regions is no longer present, as most of the action takes place around Rome. Instead, a series of tunnel networks throughout the city allows the player to travel to the different districts. However, certain missions take the player to various locations outside of Rome, including the harbor of Naples; the Alban Hills (Colli Albani); and part of Navarre, Spain, among others. Assassin's Creed: Brotherhood - The Da Vinci Disappearance Horses play a larger role in Brotherhood, not only used as a means of transport (inside the city for the first time) but as a component of acrobatic sequences and advanced combat as well, allowing ranged weapons to be used while riding them. The game also features various types of horse-related assassinations, such as horse-to-horse assassinations. To facilitate traversal, Brotherhood introduces merchandise lifts, which can be used to quickly climb up high buildings or structures.

Like previous Assassin's Creed titles, characters based on historical figures are present in the game, including Leonardo da Vinci, Niccolò Machiavelli, Caterina Sforza, Rodrigo Borgia, and Cesare Borgia. Locations in the game include the Colosseum and the Pantheon in Rome; and the town of Viana in northern Spain.

=== Multiplayer ===
Assassin's Creed: Brotherhood is the first game in the main series to feature a multiplayer mode. The players are Templars in training at an Abstergo facility. They use the animi (plural for animus) seen at the beginning of Assassin's Creed II to access memories of old Templars and acquire their skills using the "bleeding effect". There are eight game modes (Wanted, Alliance, Manhunt, Chest Capture, Advanced Wanted, Advanced Alliance, Escort, and Assassinate) and different maps, including the areas from the second and the third game like Florence, as well as new maps like Rome, Castel Gandolfo, Siena, and Mont Saint-Michel. The gameplay in multiplayer mode is similar to the core gameplay of the series, as players are required to use their assassination and stealth skills. The players must hunt down targets while being hunted themselves. Players earn points by performing assassinations, defending against pursuers, attaining bonuses or completing mode-specific objectives. It also contains a variety of characters, most of which must be unlocked.

The multiplayer mode also includes a leveling system, which allows players to unlock rewards by earning experience points during the matches and gaining new levels. Players can then unlock abilities, perks, and streaks. Abilities are active skills, which can be used again only after a cooldown time. Perks are passive skills, which can be equipped before the match and they are active all the time. Streaks are bonuses awarded for reaching a certain number of successful or failed contracts. The multiplayer beta, exclusive to PlayStation 3 users, was announced at E3 2010. It began on October 4, 2010, with early access for PlayStation Plus subscribers from September 27, and ended on October 18, 2010. Three maps were playable in the beta: Rome, Castel Gandolfo, and Siena.

Ubisoft announced that the multiplayer servers for Brotherhood, alongside several other of their older titles, would be shut down on September 1, 2022. The date was later delayed to October 1, 2022. This renders all multiplayer-related achievements and trophies on the original console versions unobtainable.

==== Game modes ====
Free-For-All

In Wanted, at least six players are on a map where they must find and assassinate each other. Each player is given another player as a target. The goal is to find and kill a target without being seen or killed by the player's assigned pursuer or pursuers. Players are indistinguishable from some of the NPC's throughout the maps. If the player kills an NPC by mistake or otherwise breaks cover, they are more easily spotted by pursuer or target alike, sometimes resulting in a chase. The player with the highest score at the end of the session wins. Players will lose their contract if they kill an NPC, are stunned by their target or their target is killed by another player. A player cannot kill another player who is not the target, but they can stun their hunter. Advanced Wanted mode is a variant of Wanted mode, with differences including an increased amount of NPCs on the map to make it difficult to pick out targets and a less accurate compass. There is generally more stealth involved in this mode than in basic Wanted.

The Assassinate mode is similar to Wanted, but instead of target contracts being assigned to players, all players are fair game. Players must identify other player characters and lock-on before assassinating. Because two players can kill each other, whoever locks on first becomes the hunter and the other becomes the target. The standard compass found in Wanted is replaced by directional arrows based on proximity, that grow to become arcs around the perimeter of the compass as other players near, and will eventually create a full circle when other players are very close. As in other modes, the player with the highest score at the end of the session is the winner.

Team

In Alliance, there are three teams, each limited to two players, both of which use the same persona. The point of this mode is to get more points than the other teams, but each team is chased by another and is only allowed to kill one specific team (not the team chasing them, but they will be able to stun the team hunting them). This mode encourages players to work together, as teammates can help each other or they can assassinate their targets simultaneously. The Advanced Alliance mode is a variant of Alliance mode, however, the players' compasses, as well as target engagement, becomes more difficult, similar to the Advanced Wanted mode.

In Manhunt there are two teams of four. One team is the hunters, the other is the hunted. Each team looks like a specific character and takes turns being the hunter and the hunted. Hunters obtain points by assassinations, while the hunted obtain points from escapes, stuns, and remaining hidden. The team with the highest score wins. In Chest Capture there are two teams of four. One team is the hunters, and the other is the hunted who need to steal chests by standing close to them. Each team looks like a specific character and takes turns being the hunter and the hunted. Hunters obtain points by assassinations, while the hunted obtain points from escapes, stuns, and stealing chests. The team with the highest score wins. The Escort mode sees one team of four players protecting a wandering NPC while the other team of four tries to assassinate him. There are two NPCs to protect at a time and they walk through a series of checkpoints, which are visible to both teams. When an escorted NPC is killed, another is synchronized. This mode has two rounds with each team playing once as an escort and once as assassins.

==== Characters ====
Players are able to choose one of the 21 available characters, including: Courtesan, Barber, Priest, Noble, Prowler, Executioner, Doctor, Blacksmith, Captain, Smuggler, Engineer, Footpad, Thief, Hellequin (a female Harlequin, which is available through uPlay) and Mercenary. Two special characters were only available in the selected pre-order editions of the game: the Harlequin and the Officer. However, these two pre-order special characters are also included in The Da Vinci Disappearance downloadable content as are the formerly pre-order only Trajan Market and Aqueducts special locations. The pack contains 4 new characters, Dama Rossa, Knight, Marquis, and Pariah. Each character has unique assassination moves and a signature weapon. Characters can be customized as the player levels up. These customization options include changing the color of the outfit and equipping different gear.

== Plot ==
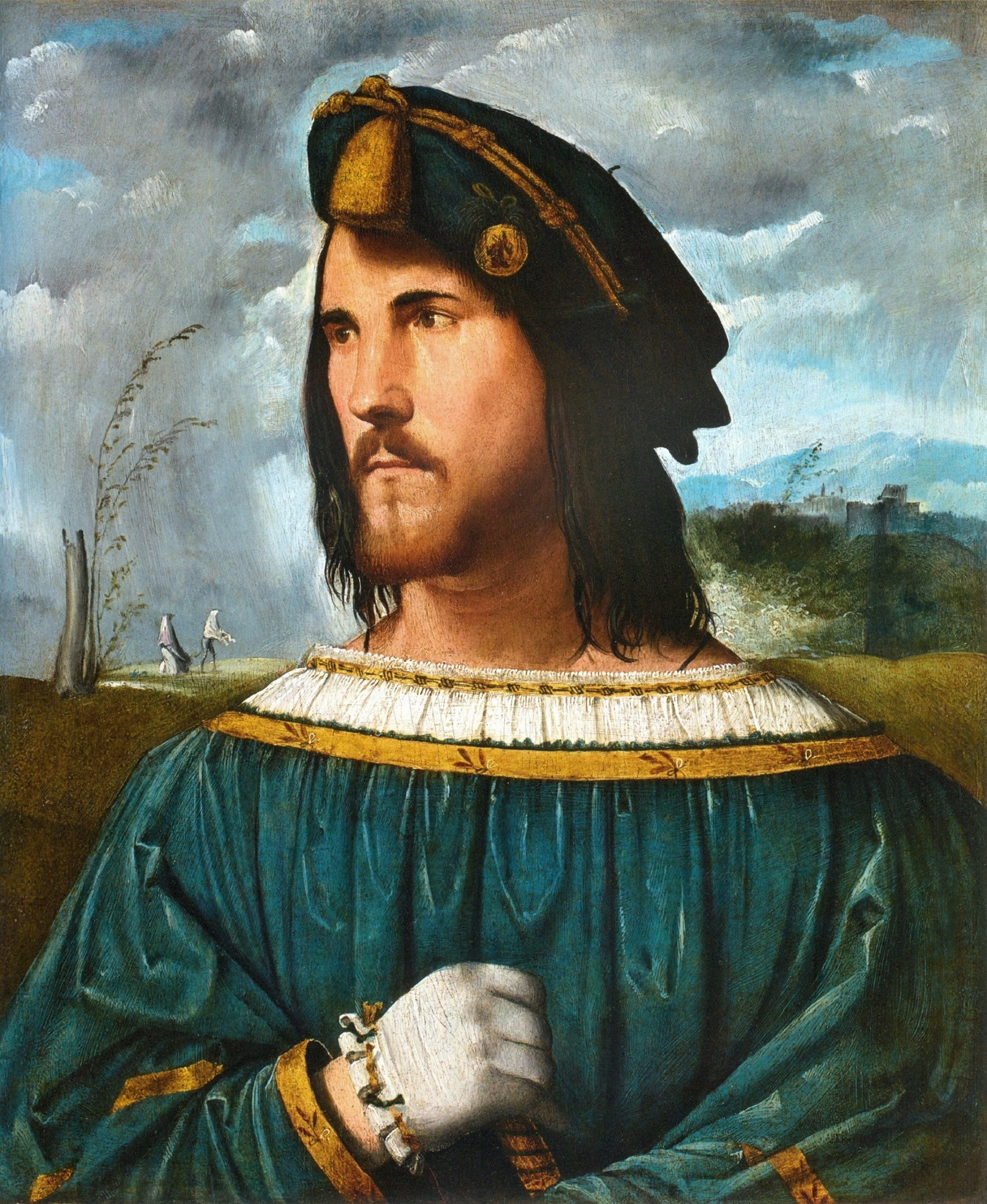
A fictionalized version of Cesare Borgia (depicted here in a portrait by Altobello Melone) serves as the game's main antagonist.

Following the events of Assassin's Creed II, Desmond Miles (Nolan North), Lucy Stillman (Kristen Bell), Rebecca Crane (Eliza Schneider), and Shaun Hastings (Danny Wallace) escape from the Templars who attacked their hideout and establish a new base in the ruins of the Villa Auditore in Monteriggioni. After restoring the electricity in the tunnels under the villa, Desmond uses the Animus 2.0 to continue reliving the genetic memories of his ancestor Ezio Auditore (Roger Craig Smith). His mission is to find the Apple of Eden, which could prevent an impending disaster coming that same year, believed to be perpetrated by the Templars.

Ezio's story continues in December 1499, as he exits the Vault and escapes Rome with his uncle, Mario (Fred Tatasciore). Returning to Monteriggioni, Ezio explains to his fellow Assassins what he saw inside the Vault and is comforted by the prospect that his personal vendetta is over; however, Niccolò Machiavelli (Shawn Baichoo) challenges Ezio's decision to leave Rodrigo Borgia (Manuel Tadros) alive. The following day, Monteriggioni is besieged by the Papal Army, commanded by Cesare Borgia (Andreas Apergis), Rodrigo's son. Cesare kills Mario and claims the Apple for the Templars. An injured Ezio escapes and travels to Rome, the center of Templar power in Italy, seeking vengeance against the Borgias. There, he discovers that the Assassin Order has lost much of its manpower and strength. Determined to rebuild the Guild, Ezio convinces Machiavelli that he can lead it, recruiting people to the Brotherhood and restoring it to its former strength.

Over the next three years, Ezio cripples the Borgias' hold in the capital, sabotaging Cesare's resources and assassinating key people close to him, while slowly restoring Rome to its former glory. After returning the Assassins to full strength, Ezio is given the rank of Il Mentore (Italian for "The Mentor") and made the de facto leader of the Assassins in Italy. During this time, Ezio's sister Claudia (Angela Galuppo) is also made an Assassin.

After learning of Ezio's actions, Cesare confronts his father to ask for more money and the Apple. Rodrigo refuses, cautious of provoking the Assassins, and attempts to kill his son with a poisoned apple, fearing Cesare's lust for power. Cesare, having only taken a bite, spits it out and forces the rest of the apple into his father's mouth, killing Rodrigo. After learning of the Apple's location, Ezio retrieves it from within St. Peter's Basilica, before using it to overwhelm Cesare's forces and withdraw the backing of his supporters. Cesare is arrested by Pope Julius II's Papal Army after Ezio and the Assassins confront him and kill his remaining followers.

A few years later, Ezio uses the Apple once more to check on Cesare, discovering he has broken out of prison. After hiding the Apple in a First Civilization Temple built underneath the Roman Colosseum, Ezio leaves Italy in pursuit of Cesare. In 1507, Cesare, with the support of his new patron, John III of Navarre, lays siege to the city of Viana in Spain. Ezio encounters Cesare on the battlements of a crumbling castle and fights him. Cesare claims that he cannot be killed by the hand of a mortal man, thus inciting Ezio to "leave [him] in the hands of fate" by dropping him off the battlements to his death.

Using the coordinates from Ezio's memories, Desmond, Lucy, Shaun, and Rebecca travel to the Temple where Ezio hid the Apple, intending to use it to locate other Temples and keep the Pieces of Eden they contain out of the Templars' reach. As Desmond enters the Temple, he is confronted with holographic apparitions of a woman called Juno (Nadia Verrucci), similar to Minerva. She comments on humanity's lack of knowledge, calling it "innocent and ignorant", before suddenly becoming angry and yelling, "We should have left you as you were!" As Desmond approaches the Apple and touches it, time freezes around him. Juno states that Desmond is descended from her race, and is their enemy; she also says there is a woman who would accompany him through "the gate," but must not be allowed to. She takes control of Desmond's body and forces him to stab Lucy. Both fall to the ground, with Lucy dead and Desmond entering a coma. As the credits roll, two men are heard discussing whether to put Desmond back in the Animus.

== Development ==
Assassin's Creed: Brotherhood was developed by Ubisoft Montreal. Montreal also worked on both of the other main Assassin's Creed games in the series and was thus chosen to lead production for the third installment. A new Assassin's Creed episode featuring multiplayer was announced during Ubisoft's 2009 fiscal third-quarter results while not revealing its name. In early May 2010, a GameStop employee published on the internet some images of a pre-order box featuring the Assassin's Creed: Brotherhood title while Ubisoft was teasing the game on Facebook and Twitter. Ubisoft then confirmed the authenticity of these pictures. Brotherhood has not been numbered unlike Assassin's Creed II because players, and even developers themselves would have expected a new setting and a new ancestor while this is only the continuation of Ezio's story.

Although game was developed primarily by Ubisoft Montreal in Canada, production was aided in part by four other Ubisoft developers: Annecy, Singapore, Bucharest and Québec City. The multiplayer mode was mainly developed by Ubisoft Annecy, the studio responsible for creating multiplayer mode in Tom Clancy's Splinter Cell: Chaos Theory. Ubisoft also announced plans for downloadable content (DLC) after the game's launch. Two sets of free DLC have already been released under the names "Animus Project Update 1.0" and "Animus Project Update 2.0". The first includes the new map Mont Saint-Michel and one new mode, Advanced Alliance. The "Animus Project Update 2.0" was released in January 2011, was also free, and included another map, mode and the introduction of a player grading system. From the perspective of performance, Ubisoft have commented that they hope the gaps between the PlayStation 3 and Xbox 360 versions will be even smaller with Brotherhood.

While still in development, creative director Patrice Désilets left before the game's presentation at the E3 2010. Ubisoft and production manager Jean-Francois Boivin stated that he only took a "creative break" after completing his task on Brotherhood. A teaser trailer of the multiplayer mode was released on the official site before the E3. A cinematic debut trailer was diffused during Ubisoft's E3 2010 press conference along a walkthrough of the game's beginning. Assassin's Creed: Brotherhood reached gold status on October 28, 2010. The Microsoft Windows version has Nvidia 3D Vision and multi screen support through AMD Eyefinity. It also uses Tagès copy protection, as well as Ubisoft online services platform, but doesn't require an always-on Internet connection to play. On November 30, 2010, a novelization of the game was published. The novel is a sequel to the previous novel.

Remastered versions of Assassin's Creed II, Brotherhood and Revelations were released as part of The Ezio Collection compilation for the PlayStation 4 and Xbox One on November 15, 2016, and for the Nintendo Switch on February 17, 2022. The remastered version includes support for UHD resolution on the PS4 Pro.

== Music ==
The music in the game was composed by Jesper Kyd, who created the scores to previous Assassin's Creed games. The soundtrack was released digitally on November 16, 2010. A physical CD-DA release of the soundtrack accompanied selected retail editions. However, the track-listing is altered from the digital release — the CD has 22 tracks, including 3 exclusive pieces, but is missing "Apple Chamber" present in the digital release.

== Retail editions ==
Features	Standard (consoles & PC)	Special Edition (consoles & PC)	Auditore Edition (consoles & PC)	Collector's Edition (consoles only)	Limited Codex Edition (consoles & PC)	Digital Deluxe Edition (PC only)	Da Vinci Edition (consoles only)
Game disc	Yes	Yes	Yes	Yes	Yes	No (Download Only)	Yes
Bonus disc with making of and game's soundtrack	No	No	No	Yes	Yes	No (Download Only)	No
Multiplayer character cards	No	No	Yes	No	Yes	Yes (Download Only)	No
Assassin's Creed: Lineage DVD	No	No	Yes	No	Yes (Europe only)	Yes (Download Only)	No
Single-player maps	No	Yes (Trajan Market)	Yes (Aqueduct)	Yes (Trajan Market and Aqueduct)	Yes (Trajan Market and Aqueduct)	Yes (Trajan Market and Aqueduct)	Yes (Trajan Market and Aqueduct)
Multiplayer characters	No	Yes (Officer or Harlequin)	No	Yes (Officer)	Yes (Officer and Harlequin)	Yes (Officer and Harlequin)	Yes (Officer, Harlequin, Dama Rossa, Knight, Marquis and Pariah)
Exclusive package	No	No	Yes (transparency box with 3D thermoformed portrait of Ezio and "Animus" effect)	Yes (Black, fold-out cardboard box)	Yes (collector's chest packaging)	No	No
The Da Vinci Disappearance DLC	No	No	No	No	No	Yes (via free update)	Yes (via free, but time-limited download)
Helmschmied Drachen armor for Ezio	No	Yes (only as pre-order bonus in Amazon)	Yes	No	Yes	Yes	Yes
Map of in-game Rome	No	No	No	Yes	Yes	Yes (Download Only)	No
Jack-in-the-box	No	No	No	Yes (The Doctor or The Harlequin)	No	No	No
Art book	No	No	No	Yes	No	No	No
Codex	No	No	No	No	Yes	Yes (Download Only)	No

There are different special retail editions of Assassin's Creed: Brotherhood. Different editions are available in different regions. There is also a certain number of pre-order bonuses, which may vary, depending on the retailer. Some retailers also offered the access to the multiplayer beta on the PlayStation 3 system as a pre-order bonus. All versions of Assassin's Creed: Brotherhood for the PlayStation 3 feature exclusive free additional downloadable content called the Copernicus Conspiracy which became available on the PlayStation Store on November 16, 2010. Players have access to several new missions featuring the famous Renaissance astronomer Copernicus. Extra content includes courier, assassination and protection missions — Ezio will be tasked with foiling the conspiracy against Copernicus and defending his philosophy. The PC version of Assassin's Creed: Brotherhood was released by Akella in Russia in exclusive Collector's Edition featuring 6 metal figurines of multiplayer characters.

== Downloadable content ==
=== Uplay content ===
Ubisoft's Uplay system enables further in-game enhancements which can be redeemed by points that are given when playing the game. The available awards are a Brotherhood theme or wallpaper for PC and PlayStation 3, Florentine Noble Attire, Armor of Altaïr, Altaïr's Robes, Gun Capacity Upgrade and Hellequin character.

=== Copernicus Conspiracy ===
Copernicus Conspiracy is a free downloadable content pack for Assassin's Creed: Brotherhood, initially released exclusively for the PlayStation 3 on the game's release, later receiving official support on the PC via a patch on May 23, 2017, on both Steam and Uplay and later being automatically available in the Ezio Trilogy Collection on the PS4 and Xbox One. It focuses on the famed astronomer Nicolaus Copernicus, who gets into trouble with the Vatican, who do not want Copernicus educating the public about astronomy. The pack consists of eight optional missions, ranging from courier, assassination and protection objectives.

=== Animus Project Update 1.0 ===
The Animus Project Update 1.0 included a new game mode and a new map. The game mode, Advanced Alliance, is a version of the Alliance mode, with target identification and engagement more difficult than in the original, thus providing a more challenging experience for players. With three teams of two players each, Advanced Alliance is a tougher test for players and rewards teams that work together. The new map, Mont Saint-Michel, is located on a rocky tidal island of Normandy in France. Its particular topography of narrow streets, high-perched bell-tower, and multi-leveled architecture are perfect for hunters and predators alike to surge from out of nowhere to execute their prey. To survive, recruits need to use free-running and narrow roads to their advantage.

=== Animus Project Update 2.0 ===
The Animus Project Update 2.0 included a new game mode and map. The Pienza Map provides a free-running playground with wide-open plaza areas, where predators and targets can quickly blend and disappear, surrounded by narrow alleys and multi-story buildings for extra verticality. In the new Chest Capture multiplayer mode, two teams composed of three players compete as Hunters and Protectors; partnered with fellow Templars, Hunters will attempt to steal the contents of the chests scattered around the map as protectors attempt to prevent this. Also included in the update is a Templar Score feature to reward diligent work by Abstergo recruits. Advanced Alliance is also packaged with the new DLC, while the Mont Saint-Michel map is not. Only one DLC can be activated at a time, so players will either be missing the new map from the 1.0 update or the new mode, new map and Templar Scoring from the 2.0 update.

=== The Da Vinci Disappearance ===
The Da Vinci Disappearance, originally available via the PlayStation Network and Xbox Live, features new content for both single player and multiplayer modes. For the single player game, this expansion adds eight new missions, two of which take place at new locations, and ten trophies/achievements. The DLC's storyline, which is set before the final memory sequence of the base game, follows Ezio as he investigates the disappearance of his friend Leonardo da Vinci in the year 1506. The multiplayer content includes two new game modes, a new map and four new characters.

The PC version of the game includes the DLC for free (it must be activated through Uplay) along with both Animus Project Updates. In March, the "Da Vinci Edition" of Assassin's Creed: Brotherhood, which includes the base game as well as The Da Vinci Disappearance, was released for consoles. This DLC doubles as the technical Animus Project Update 3.0, with the addition of the preorder multiplayer characters, the Harlequin and Officer, as well as the preorder-only special Drachen Armor for Ezio.

== Reception ==
Assassin's Creed: Brotherhood

Aggregate scores
Aggregator	Score
GameRankings	(X360) 90.55% (PS3) 89.92% (PC) 87.64%
Metacritic	(PS3) 90/100 (X360) 89/100 (PC) 88/100

Review scores
Publication	Score
1Up.com	A-
Edge	8/10
Eurogamer	10/10
Game Informer	9.25/10
GamePro	5/5
GameSpot	8.5/10
GameTrailers	9/10
IGN	8/10
Official Xbox Magazine (US)	8/10
PC PowerPlay	10/10

Assassin's Creed: Brotherhood received critical acclaim upon release. Aggregating review websites GameRankings and Metacritic gave the Xbox 360 version 90.55% and 89/100, the PlayStation 3 version 89.92% and 90/100 and the PC version 87.64% and 88/100. It won best Action Adventure game in the Spike TV Video Game Awards 2010 The game has also been nominated for seven British Academy Games Awards in 2011, including Best Game; it ultimately won an award in the Action category. During the 14th Annual Interactive Achievement Awards, the Academy of Interactive Arts & Sciences nominated Brotherhood for "Adventure Game of the Year" and outstanding achievement in "Game Direction", "Online Gameplay", "Original Music Composition", and "Sound Design".

The multiplayer was heralded by many at E3 2010, where it was showcased for the first time. GameTrailers lauded it as the Best Multiplayer Game of the show. The multiplayer portion of Assassin's Creed: Brotherhood was generally well received by critics. Game Informer gave the Brotherhood a 9.25/10, commenting that the ability to raise a group of followers was a significant enhancement to the previous title's gameplay, and praising the new multiplayer mode as something never before seen. The magazine's review also gave very high marks to the graphics, sound effects and voice acting.

Eurogamer praised everything about Assassin's Creed: Brotherhood, giving it a 10/10, and particularly noted the maturity of the story: "One mission sees Ezio disrupting an assassination attempt in the ruins of the Roman Colosseum during a play about the death of Jesus Christ. It demands a developer of poise and compassion to wield such thorny concepts deftly, and it's a measure of Ubisoft Montreal's maturity that it is more than equal to the challenge...Brotherhood builds an intriguing mystery around compelling characters, surrounds them with collectibles and secrets, and encourages play – and nothing feels out of place."

Reviews for the delayed PC version questioned the reason behind the delayed release date as the game was virtually unchanged from the console version albeit with better graphical enhancements and minor bonus content. However, most praised Ubisoft's move to remove the DRM that marred the PC version of Assassin's Creed II as well as include all DLC free of charge.

=== Sales ===
The game passed the one million sales mark in less than a week after its release. Assassin's Creed: Brotherhood has become Ubisoft's fastest-selling European title ever. It also had the best Ubisoft's launch in Europe and is the best-selling launch title ever as of November 2010. As of May 2011, Ubisoft announced the game had shipped 7.2 million units, and franchise shipments stood at 29 million units.

== Sequel ==
On May 5, 2011, Assassin's Creed: Revelations was revealed to be the next main installment in the Assassin's Creed franchise. Set in Constantinople, at the peak of the Ottoman Empire, it is the final major game in the series to feature Ezio as the main protagonist, and follows him on a quest to uncover the secrets of the Assassins and unlock a library built by Altaïr Ibn-LaʼAhad, the protagonist of the first Assassin's Creed game. Altaïr is also playable in Revelations as a secondary protagonist, featured in a series of flashback missions. The multiplayer mode introduced in Brotherhood also returns, and has been expanded with "more modes, more maps, and more characters". The game was released on November 15, 2011.

On September 17, 2018, Triton Noir announced a board game called Assassin's Creed: Brotherhood of Venice. It takes place in 1509 (two years after the events of Assassin's Creed: Brotherhood and before Revelations) and features characters from the games such as Ezio, Leonardo da Vinci, and Lucrezia Borgia, as well as new characters like Alessandra. It was developed by Thibaud de la Touanne, and is estimated to provide over 20 hours of playtime. Originally scheduled for a November 2018 release, the game was later delayed and eventually released in May 2021 in Asia, and in June 2021 in Europe and the United States.
