= Rachid Badouri =

Canadian comedian

- Born: October 16, 1976 (age 49); Laval, Quebec, Canada
- Occupations: Comedian, actor
- Years active: 1999–present
- Known for: Stand-up comedy, television appearances
- Notable work: Arrête ton cinéma!, Just for Laughs performances
- Television: Quel talent! (2024–present)
- Awards: * Craven A Award (1999) * Revelation of the Year – Just for Laughs (2005) * Discovery of the Year – Oliviers Gala (2006) * Performance of the Year – Oliviers Gala (2008) * Double Platinum for ticket sales in Quebec (2009)

Rachid Badouri (born October 16, 1976, in Laval, Quebec) is a Moroccan Canadian comedian.

== Biography ==
Badouri was born to immigrants of Moroccan Berber origin. He studied at College Montmorency in Laval, Quebec where he had his first experience on stage. In 1999, he had a major appearance at Just for Laughs (Juste pour rire) festival in Montreal with a presentation about immigration. He also appeared in a number of comedic advertisements in Quebec media (television, radio, print media), and has had occasional acting roles in film and television, notably in the 2010 film The Bait (L'Appât).

In October 2007, he launched his first one-man show entitled Arrête ton cinéma! .

In 2024, he was announced as one of the judges on Quel talent!, the forthcoming Quebec version of the international Got Talent franchise.

== Awards ==
- 1999: Craven A award joined with École Nationale de l'Humour and third place in Just For Laughs gala
- 2005: Revelation of the Year at Just for Laughs festival
- 2006: Discovery of the Year at the Oliviers gala
- 2008: Performance of the Year at the Oliviers gala
- 2009: Double platinum for number of tickets sold in 18 months in Quebec (above 100,000 tickets)
