= Baby for Sale =

- Baby for sale
- Genre: True life events
- Written by: John Wierick
- Directed by: Peter Svatek
- Starring: Dana Delany
- Theme music composer: James Gelfand
- Composer: James Gelfand
- Countries of origin: United States; Canada
- Original language: English

Production
- Producer: Irene Litinsky
- Cinematography: Pierre Jodoin
- Editor: Jean Beaudoin
- Running time: 89 minutes
- Production companies: APVQ; Alliance of Canadian Cinema, Television and Radio Artists; Canadian Film or Video Production Tax Credit; Directors Guild of Canada; Lions Gate Television; Muse Entertainment Enterprises; Québec Production Services Tax Credit; Société de Développement des Entreprises Culturelles; Thinkfactory Media; Christal Films

Original release
- Network: Lifetime
- Release: 12 July 2004

Baby for Sale is a 2004 television film that was premiered on the Lifetime Network on 12 July 2004. It stars Dana Delany and was directed by Peter Svatek. The filming took place in Montreal, Quebec, Canada. The story is based on true life events

== Cast ==
- Dana Delany as Nathalie Johnson
- Hart Bochner as Steve Johnson
- Bruce Ramsay as Gabor Szabo
- Romano Orzari as Joey Perrotta
- Elizabeth Marleau as Janka
- Ellen David as Kathy Williamson
- Claudia Besso as Laura Jackson

== Reception ==
Andy Webb from "The Movie Scene" gave the film three out of five stars and wrote: "What this all boils down to is that "Baby for Sale" typically has an interesting true story but just as typically for a Lifetime movie comes up short on realism and subtlety making it very much a movie for a certain type of audience who don't require gritty realism to be entertained." Robert Pardi from TV Guide gave it two out of four stars.
