= Northern Shade =

- Theatrical release poster
- Directed by: Christopher Rucinski
- Written by: Christopher Rucinski
- Produced by: Christopher Rucinski
- Starring: Jesse Gavin; Titania Galliher; Joseph Poliquin; Alejandro Bravo; Romano Orzari
- Edited by: Christopher Rucinski, Derek Drouin
- Release date: 2022
- Country: United States
- Language: English

Northern Shade is a 2022 independent feature film. It stars Jesse Gavin, Titania Galliher, Joseph Poliquin, Alejandro Bravo and Romano Orzari. The film premiered at the Phoenix Film Festival, where it won Best Screenplay. It also won Best Actor for Gavin at the Downtown Los Angeles Film Festival, Best Narrative Feature and Best Actor for Gavin at the Fargo Film Festival, Best Feature at the Poppy Jasper Film Festival, Best Feature, 2nd Runner Up at the Woods Hole Film Festival, and Best Drama Feature, Best Actor for Gavin at the Legacy Theatre Film Festival.

It is the feature directorial and screenwriting debut of Christopher Rucinski. Rucinski has editorial credits for Ford v Ferrari, Indiana Jones and the Dial of Destiny and War for the Planet of the Apes.

== Plot ==
Northern Shade revolves around Justin McLaughlin, a U.S. Army Afghan combat veteran suffering from post-traumatic stress syndrome, living a solitary life on his boat. The police inform Justin they’ve found his truck burned and abandoned, which confuses him because he gave the truck to his younger brother, Charlie.

Charlie is missing, and despite his reticence to go back into society, Justin investigates what happened to him. The police aren’t interested in assisting Justin, so he turns to Frankie, also a veteran and former police officer who is now a private investigator.

The investigation leads to a militia group headed by Billy, who attempts to recruit Justin into the group. Justin and Frankie discover a larger plan the militia group is about to undertake, and the pair try to remove Charlie from the militia compound and stop the plan.

== Cast ==
- Jesse Gavin as Justin McLaughlin
- Titania Galliher as Frankie Rosa
- Joseph Poliquin as Charlie McLaughlin
- Alejandro Bravo as Noel Acosta
- Romano Orzari as Billy

== Production ==
Northern Shade was shot in Connecticut in November 2020, during the COVID-19 pandemic. Locations include New Haven, Fair Haven, Branford, Guilford, Voluntown, the Quinnipiac River Marina, the Stony Creek Quarry and the Shore Line Trolley Museum.

Christopher Rucinski, director and writer of the film, and cinematographer Grzegorz Gill were raised in the area in Branford. Rucinski moved to Los Angeles to work in the film industry, but returned to Connecticut to be with his family during the pandemic. While in lockdown, he reworked the script, originally written in 2019, to take place during the pandemic and bring the production in compliance with health mandates. The cast included many military veterans; Rucinski held a special screening of the movie for them in New Haven.

== Reception ==
On Rotten Tomatoes the film has a 100% rating based on reviews from 6 critics.

In a review of the movie by the San Jose Mercury News, Randy Meyers wrote, "Rucinski is equally at home as a screenwriter as he is a director, and the of-the-minute Northern Shade — with a cast that consists, in a large part, of veterans — shows this first-time filmmaker is already walking on a firm foundation” and “that a blockbuster budget isn’t essential when making an intense, character-driven thriller".

Film Threat’s Alan Ng wrote: “Northern Shade is a solid noir thriller with good performances. It may miss the glitz and glamour of the big Hollywood productions, but the director pulls through with an engaging story that will keep you guessing until the end.”

Bobby LePiere, another Film Threat reviewer, added: "Rucinski keeps the whole thing moving swiftly while balancing the mystery of what happened to Charlie and characterizations pretty well. The final 20 or so minutes are perfect, with everything wrapping up the only way possible. So, even with its flaws, the film is a strong debut for the filmmaker, and he should be proud of what he’s accomplished."

Roger Moore of Movie Nation wrote that Gavin’s portrayal of the emotionally damaged lead character was a “breakout performance” comparing him to John Hawkes in Winter's Bone. "Gavin & Co. make this an intimate thriller with personal agendas, limited people making rash, limiting decisions with life or death consequences, with no one there to talk them out of any of it."
