= Assassin's Creed: Lineage =

Canadian short films series

- Directed by: Yves Simoneau
- Written by: Yves Simoneau; William Reymond
- Produced by: Pierre Raymond
- Starring: Romano Orzari
- Cinematography: Guy Dufaux
- Edited by: Isabelle Malenfant
- Music by: George S. Clinton
- Production companies: Ubisoft (Montreal); Hybride Technologies
- Distributed by: New Video Group
- Release dates: 26 October 2009 (First); 12 November 2009 (Second); 14 November 2009 (Third)
- Running time: 36 minutes (total)
- Country: Canada
- Language: English

Assassin's Creed: Lineage is a series of three Canadian short films based on the Assassin's Creed video game series, directed by Yves Simoneau. The films are made by Ubisoft Montreal in collaboration with Hybride Technology, and mark Ubisoft's first attempt to step into the film industry. The three short films were released on YouTube to promote Assassin's Creed II, to which they serve as a prequel, describing the history of Ezio Auditore da Firenze and his family before the events of the game. The films primarily revolve around Ezio's father Giovanni (played by Romano Orzari), an Assassin from 15th-century Florence, and his investigation of the mysterious murder of the Duke of Milan, Galeazzo Maria Sforza, which leads him to confront a larger conspiracy.

The first episode was released on 26 October 2009, followed by the other two on 12 November. The complete film was released on 14 November 2009.

== Plot ==
=== Episode 1 ===
In 1476 Florence, Giovanni Auditore monologues about the corruption, betrayal and murder hidden behind the enlightenment of the Renaissance, and about his fight to preserve justice, honor, and his family's safety. From the shadows, he quietly watches his family enjoying themselves at dinner, before departing into the moonlit streets of Florence. Outside, he ambushes a party of mercenaries led by Rodrigo Borgia as they attempt to sneak out of the city. Giovanni kills two of the mercenaries and incapacitates the third, but Borgia escapes in the confusion. Giovanni brings the surviving mercenary to Lorenzo de' Medici, where he is tortured for information, revealing a plot to assassinate the Duke of Milan, Galeazzo Maria Sforza, on Saint Stephen's Day. Giovanni races to Milan but arrives too late to prevent Sforza's death. After killing the assassins, Giovanni searches one of the bodies and finds several coins stamped with the coat of arms of Venice. Returning home, he monologues that Sforza's death has robbed Medici of a powerful ally, but that he knows where to find those responsible.

=== Episode 2 ===
Giovanni arrives in Venice to search for whoever ordered Sforza's death. His investigation leads him to the Doge's Palace, Venice, where he sees two men—Silvio and Marco Barbarigo—dispatching a courier to deliver a letter to their master in Rome. Giovanni intercepts and overpowers the courier, who commits suicide to avoid interrogation. Giovanni returns to Florence and presents the letter to Lorenzo and Uberto Alberti, Florence's Gonfaloniere of Justice, but it is encrypted. Uberto gets Father Antonio Maffei da Volterra to decode the letter but secretly orders him not to tell anyone of its contents.

After enjoying some time with his family, Giovanni is summoned by Maffei back to Lorenzo's palace. His son Ezio, confused as to why his father must leave so late in the night, asks to come with him, but Giovanni refuses. At the palace, Uberto claims the letter could not be decoded, meaning the only way to see who it is intended for is to deliver it personally. Giovanni volunteers for the mission and departs for Rome. Back in Venice, Borgia and his allies meet to formulate their next move, and pray "May The Father of Understanding be with us!" while arranging their swords in familiar symbol akin the cross pattée—confirming they are Templars.

=== Episode 3 ===
Giovanni arrives in Rome and delivers the letter, which is passed through the crowd until it reaches Borgia. Borgia goes to the Holy See and gives the letter to Pope Sixtus IV. The pair discuss the fact that Lorenzo is unwilling to bend to the Pope's authority; when Borgia suggests using force, the Pope agrees to support the Pazzi conspiracy to restore order to Florence. After Borgia leaves, Giovanni follows him to St. Peter's Basilica, only to discover it is an ambush. Borgia reveals that he knows Giovanni's name and invites him to join the Templars and live to see "a new world", but Giovanni refuses. Giovanni manages to fight off Borgia's men, but his left hidden blade is broken and he is struck in the chest with a throwing knife by Borgia, who seizes the opportunity to escape.

Back home, while his wife Maria tends to his wounds, Giovanni confesses to her his fear that Sforza's assassination was merely the start of a conspiracy, and that the next blow will strike Florence. Suddenly, Maffei and several guards arrive at the house, asking for Giovanni. His eldest son Federico lies that his father has already left while Giovanni escapes through a hidden passage. In Rome, Borgia and his fellow Templars agree that the main threat to their plans is Giovanni. Borgia says he has a plan to deal with the Assassin, and that with him gone, nothing will stand in their way. Back in Florence, Giovanni prowls the streets—pausing to muse when he sees Ezio flirting with his girlfriend—while monologuing that dark days are approaching Florence and time is running out. He remarks that no matter what happens, he and his sons are "the Auditore da Firenze, and we are Assassins!" The film concludes with the message "The conclusion ... is in your hands", setting the stage for Assassin's Creed II.

== Cast ==
- Romano Orzari as Giovanni Auditore
- Manuel Tadros as Rodrigo Borgia
- Claudia Ferri as Maria Auditore
- Jesse Rath as Federico Auditore
- Devon Bostick as Ezio Auditore
- Alex Ivanovici as Lorenzo de' Medici
- Michel Perron as Uberto Alberti
- Roc Lafortune as Prisoner/Man No. 1
- Arthur Grosser as Pope Sixtus IV
- Shawn Baichoo as Father Antonio Maffei
- Peter Miller as Galeazzo Maria Sforza
- Harry Standjofski as Silvio Barbarigo
- Frank Fontaine as Marco Barbarigo
- Maxime Savaria as Courier

The films and the game share a common cast. All of the actors (except Devon Bostick, who only has his face and voice used) have been mo-capped (for narrative sequences), their faces have been scanned and their voices have been recorded for the video game.

== Production ==
Behind-the-scenes image of Assassin's Creed: Lineage

Both film makers and game makers worked very closely to link the two titles. Live actors were filmed on green screen (just like Hybride Technologies, participating in the production, did with 300, Sin City and Avatar) which was then replaced by the game's environment extracted from the engine to XSI (half of those assets were re-worked on the texture and geometrical levels before being exported to be used in the film).

About 50% of the costumes that appear in Lineage were authentic period re-creations leased from Italy, the rest of the costumes were designed and crafted by a 3rd party design studio on behalf of Ubisoft and assembled by a group of Montreal, Quebec costume specialists.

Corey May, the writer of Assassin's Creed II, worked closely with the Assassin's Creed: Lineage scriptwriter, William Reymond, in order to make sure both stories were linked to the original story.

== Soundtrack ==
The score of the films is composed by George S. Clinton, unlike Assassin's Creed II's soundtrack, which was scored by Jesper Kyd.

== Promotion and release ==
Ubisoft acquired on 8 July 2008 the post-production VFX studio Hybride Technologies based in Piedmont as part of the game company's strategy to extend its brands to other media and to converge gaming and filming entertainment.

A year later, during a press conference held at the E3 2009, Ubisoft revealed the making of short films based on the universe of Assassin's Creed II using the game's engine with the participation of Hybride and Ubisoft Digital Arts. Ubisoft then released more details about the project during the 2009's Comic-Con, revealing some behind the scenes shots at the same period.

Ubisoft held a special press screening of the first episode at a theater in the Champs-Élysées on 19 October 2009 and a public teaser trailer was released on the same day.

The first episode was released on YouTube on 26 October 2009, though it was announced for the 27th, and it was showcased on YouTube homepage in eight different countries. It was also released on EuroGamerTV on 2 November 2009. The second and the third parts of the Lineage were released on YouTube on 12 November 2009. The complete film was released two days later.

Assassin's Creed: Lineage was first released on DVD in March 2010 as a bonus content in a special Lineage Edition of Assassin's Creed II (also known as Special Film Edition). The DVD was included in the special editions of Assassin's Creed: Brotherhood: Auditore Edition (exclusive to Australia, Europe and New Zealand) and Limited Codex Edition.

Lineage is included in The Ezio Collection, which was released on 15 November 2016.

== Critical reaction ==
IGN's Christopher Monfette said in a 2009 review that "Lineage feels more like something that would make an excellent inclusion in a high-priced special edition than anything that one would pay to see". In a 2011 review R.L. Shaffer said that "The short is very good, but not quite engaging enough to earn the series any new fans".

== Bibliography ==
- Manco, Emanuele (2012). "Assassin's Creed, cronologia del successso". In Guadalupi, Marco (ed.). Effemme 2 (in Italian). Delos Digital srl. p. 132. ISBN 9788867750184.
