= Assassin's Creed: Brotherhood - The Da Vinci Disappearance =

- Developer: Ubisoft Montreal
- Publisher: Ubisoft
- Series: Assassin's Creed
- Platforms: PlayStation 3, Xbox 360, Microsoft Windows
- Release: March 8, 2011
- Genres: Action-adventure, stealth
- Modes: Single-player, multiplayer

Assassin's Creed: Brotherhood - The Da Vinci Disappearance is a downloadable content expansion for the 2010 action-adventure video game Assassin's Creed: Brotherhood. Developed by Ubisoft Montreal and published by Ubisoft, it was released for the PlayStation 3 and Xbox 360 on March 8, 2011, and was included with the Windows version of Brotherhood. The expansion adds eight single-player missions centred on Ezio Auditore da Firenze's search for his kidnapped friend Leonardo da Vinci, as well as two multiplayer modes, a map based on the Alhambra, four playable characters and additional achievements and trophies.

The story is set in 1506, between the main campaign's final sequences, and introduces Leonardo's apprentice Salaì and a fictional group called the Hermeticists, who seek a temple associated with Pythagoras. Critics generally praised the characterization, voice acting, platforming sequences and quantity of content, while responses to its mandatory-stealth missions, chase sequences, length and story were divided. Later scholarship has examined the expansion's representation of the relationship between Leonardo and Salaì and the use of its concluding coordinates across the wider Assassin's Creed transmedia narrative.

== Gameplay ==
The Da Vinci Disappearance retains the open-world action-adventure and stealth gameplay of Assassin's Creed: Brotherhood. The new storyline is incorporated into the existing campaign rather than launched separately, appearing on the map as a series of recovered memories once the player has completed Sequence 3. The player controls Ezio while navigating Rome and two newly created environments, using parkour, social stealth, melee weapons and assassination techniques carried over from the base game.

The single-player campaign consists of eight missions and was estimated by reviewers to take between two and three hours to complete. Its objectives include following and pursuing suspects, infiltrating guarded compounds, fighting Hermeticists, recovering Leonardo's paintings and examining them for concealed diagrams. Several missions require Ezio to remain undetected, with discovery causing immediate desynchronization, while the two new environments place greater emphasis on climbing and environmental puzzles than ordinary missions in Rome.

The expansion adds the Assassinate and Escort modes to Brotherhood's multiplayer component. Assassinate is a free-for-all mode for six to eight players without automatically assigned contracts. Players instead identify other human-controlled characters among crowds and manually select them as targets. Escort divides eight players into two teams, with one protecting computer-controlled targets as they travel between checkpoints and the other attempting to assassinate them; the teams exchange roles between rounds.

Its multiplayer content also includes a map modelled on the Alhambra in Granada, containing interconnected indoor, outdoor and vertically layered areas. Four playable character models—the Dama Rossa, Knight, Marquis and Pariah—were added, together with new assassination animations. The expansion also introduced ten achievements or trophies, some tied to the storyline and others requiring particular combat, movement or horse-riding actions.

== Plot ==
In 1506, Ezio visits Leonardo at his workshop in Rome while attempting to arrange passage to Spain, where he intends to continue pursuing Cesare Borgia. Leonardo agrees to introduce him to a ship captain but first asks Ezio to find his absent apprentice, Salaì. Ezio locates Salaì gambling at the Thieves' Guild and helps him fight a group of robed men who have been questioning him about Leonardo's research. When they return to the workshop, they find it ransacked and Leonardo missing. A message scratched into the floor directs them towards paintings Leonardo had previously given to Ezio, which were dispersed after the destruction of the Auditore villa at Monteriggioni.

Ezio begins recovering the five paintings. The first has been acquired by Lucrezia Borgia and taken to her estate at Belriguardo. Ezio infiltrates the villa, confronts Lucrezia and escapes with the painting. Salaì subsequently identifies the owners of the remaining works, leading Ezio to pursue a fleeing art dealer, investigate the murder of another dealer, protect a ship carrying a painting and infiltrate an exhibition to replace a work with a forgery. During these missions, Ezio learns that Leonardo was taken by the Hermeticists, followers of Hermetic and Pythagorean teachings who believe he can lead them to a hidden temple.

After all five paintings are recovered, Ezio discovers small symbols concealed within them. Combining the symbols produces a map indicating the entrance to the Temple of Pythagoras. Ezio enters its underground passages, confronts the Hermeticists and kills their leader, Ercole Massimo, before freeing Leonardo. Massimo had expected to find the Pythagorean “unifier”, which he believed would reveal a universal numerical truth and transform humanity.

Ezio and Leonardo proceed through the temple together, solving mechanical and architectural puzzles until they enter a vault created by the First Civilization. Activating its central pedestal causes a sequence of numbers and letters to appear: 43 39 19 N and 75 27 42 W. Leonardo cannot interpret them, but Ezio concludes that the message was intended for someone else observing his memories. In the modern-day framing narrative, unidentified Assassins monitoring the comatose Desmond Miles recognize the figures as coordinates and state that they now have the location of the temple.

== Development and release ==
Ubisoft announced The Da Vinci Disappearance on February 17, 2011. The announced package comprised eight single-player missions, two new locations, two unspecified gameplay features, ten achievements or trophies, two multiplayer modes, four characters and the Alhambra map. It was positioned as the first paid story expansion for Brotherhood, following two free multiplayer updates released as the Animus Project updates.

Julien Laferrière served as associate producer. The Da Vinci Disappearance was his first project in that position, after he had supervised user-interface, menu and visual-effects work on Assassin's Creed II. Ubisoft later described his work on the expansion as preparation for his role overseeing game design, mission design and technology on Assassin's Creed III.

Ubisoft showed the expansion at Microsoft's February 2011 Games Showcase in San Francisco. GameSpot's Kevin VanOrd played its first five missions and interviewed Laferrière about the add-on. VanOrd reported that Ubisoft Montreal had chosen to give Leonardo a more central role after his comparatively limited involvement in the main campaign, while the developers integrated the missions into the existing sequence structure so that they could be played without completing the full story.

David Hinkle of Engadget played two missions at the same event. He reported that the campaign would span Rome, Belriguardo and a then-undisclosed third area, and considered its scope larger than the two downloadable story sequences produced for Assassin's Creed II. The demonstrated missions introduced Salaì, established the Hermeticists' interest in Leonardo's research and included Ezio's infiltration of Lucrezia Borgia's country estate.

The expansion was released on March 8, 2011. Unlike the console versions, it was included without a separate charge in the Windows release of Brotherhood, including its digital deluxe edition. Its single-player campaign was later incorporated into Assassin's Creed: The Ezio Collection, alongside the other solo downloadable content from Assassin's Creed II, Brotherhood and Assassin's Creed: Revelations. The collection was released for PlayStation 4 and Xbox One in 2016 and later for Nintendo Switch in 2022.

== Reception ==
Reception

Aggregate score
Aggregator	Score
Metacritic	PS3: 76/100; X360: 75/100

Review scores
Publication	Score
GameSpot	7.5/10
IGN	6.5/10
3DJuegos	8.7/10

The Da Vinci Disappearance received “generally favorable” reviews according to Metacritic. The Xbox 360 version holds an aggregate score of 75 out of 100 based on 13 reviews, while the PlayStation 3 version holds 76 out of 100 based on nine reviews.

Reviewers frequently praised the expansion's characterization. GameSpot's Kevin VanOrd called Salaì an immediately likeable addition and commended his flirtatious exchanges with Ezio, Leonardo's absent-minded warmth, Lucrezia's return and the quality of the voice acting. VanOrd considered an exchange between Ezio and Lucrezia one of the series' most entertaining scenes, although he criticized unexplained conveniences in the plot. Mikel Reparaz of GamesRadar+ similarly welcomed the decision to place Leonardo and Salaì at the centre of the story after Leonardo had been underused in Brotherhood. The Spanish publication 3DJuegos regarded Salaì's characterization and the campaign's opening and conclusion as particular strengths, describing the story as comparable in quality to the main series. By contrast, Nikolas Markoglou of the Greek publication GameOver.gr found the narrative superficial and criticized the lack of development afforded to Hermeticist leader Ercole Massimo. He considered the search for the paintings a weak justification for additional missions, although he found the final revelation intriguing.

Critical responses to the mission design were similarly divided. VanOrd praised an early infiltration sequence and the final temple, comparing the latter favourably with the lairs and tombs in earlier games. He particularly approved of its platforming puzzles and supernatural atmosphere, but disliked the timed chases, prolonged tailing sequences and imprecision required by some objectives. Reparaz also praised the new platform-puzzle environments but objected to the frequency of forced-stealth sections, noting that detection produced immediate failure in half of the missions. 3DJuegos considered the missions entertaining and varied despite largely retaining the established mixture of exploration, assassination and timed objectives. The publication criticized occasional control imprecision and some of the painting puzzles, but concluded that these weaknesses did not outweigh the campaign's stronger sequences. GameOver.gr was less positive, describing many objectives as repetitions of tasks already used extensively in Brotherhood. Markoglou nevertheless praised the two missions set in new environments for their platforming and level construction.

The Assassinate multiplayer mode was generally received more favourably than Escort. VanOrd found Assassinate tense because players had to distinguish opponents from non-player characters without assigned contracts, while he considered Escort less satisfying because killing a protected target often exposed the attacker to immediate retaliation. Reparaz similarly praised the uncertainty created by Assassinate but found its targeting system unreliable. He regarded Escort as enjoyable, though weaker than the base game's best modes. 3DJuegos praised the Alhambra map's mixture of indoor, outdoor and vertically arranged spaces and preferred Assassinate's free-for-all structure to Escort. GameOver.gr also regarded Assassinate as the stronger addition, finding that it rewarded patience and observation. The publication criticized Escort as repetitive because attackers were readily identified after striking the computer-controlled targets.

== Analysis and legacy ==
Jess Root-Williams, Taylor M. Kessner and Jeremy Bernier examined the expansion as part of a qualitative study of queer representation throughout the Assassin's Creed series. They argued that the Ezio trilogy contained comparatively little queer representation despite its Renaissance setting and the historical record of queer life in contemporary Italy. The authors identified Leonardo's statement elsewhere in the trilogy that women were not a “distraction” and his relationship with his apprentice in The Da Vinci Disappearance as the trilogy's principal examples of implied representation, describing the latter as suggesting an undertone beyond a platonic relationship.

Contemporary reviewers also interpreted the relationship in this manner. VanOrd described Salaì as Leonardo's beloved and considered the portrayal historically grounded, while Reparaz referred to Salaì as Leonardo's apprentice and lover. Both writers treated Salaì's relationship with Leonardo and his flirtatious interactions with Ezio as integral aspects of his characterization rather than incidental background details.

The expansion's ending prompted players to investigate the coordinates displayed in the Pythagorean vault. Shortly after its release, Stephen Totilo of Kotaku reported that the numbers pointed to land near Turin, New York, north of the city of Rome, New York. Ubisoft declined to explain the clue and said its interpretation was left to players, prompting speculation that the location would be used by a later game in the series.

Media scholar Connie Veugen subsequently examined the coordinates in a chapter about historical games and alternate-reality-game techniques. She described how players discussed the location on Assassin's Creed forums and how players living nearby offered to investigate it when online maps proved insufficiently detailed. The coordinates later reappeared in the browser-based Assassin's Creed Initiates, before Assassin's Creed III established the location as an ancient temple. Veugen connected this progression to the use of collective intelligence and other alternate-reality-game characteristics to involve the franchise's player community across several media.
