= Khadija Assad =

Moroccan actress and comedian (died 2023)

- Born: 1952; Casablanca
- Died: January 25, 2023
- Citizenship: Morocco, Canada
- Occupations: Actor, Television actor, Television presenter

Khadija Assad (Arabic: خديجة أسد; 1952–2023) was a Moroccan actress and comedian. Nicknamed "The Lioness", she was considered an emblematic figure in Moroccan cinema and television. Assad was best known for her work alongside her husband Aziz Saadallah and for her role in Lalla Fatima, one of Morocco's most famous sitcoms.

== Early life and education ==
Assad was born in Casablanca, Morocco. She studied at the Lalla Aicha secondary school. In 1971, encouraged by her parents, she enrolled at the Municipal Conservatory of Casablanca, where she studied for four years.

== Career ==
Assad's debut as a professional actress was in 1973 when she participated in the "artistic evenings" transmitted from the Ain Chock studios. A member of the Masrah Annass theatrical troupe, her first role in theater was in Tayeb Saddiki's Maqamat Badi3 Zaman Hamadani.

== Personal life and death ==
Assad was married to Moroccan actor Aziz Saadallah until his death in 2020. The couple was described as "Moroccan television's most famous couple".

Assad died in Casablanca on 25 January 2023 after a long battle with cancer.

== Filmography ==
=== Television ===
- Lalla Fatima
- Dour biha Ya Chibani
- Bent Bladi (2009)
- Machi Bhalhoum (2018)

=== Feature films ===
- Les Casablancais (1998)
- Number One (2009)
- The Bait (L'Appât) (2010)
