= Romano Orzari =

Canadian actor

- Born: 12 December 1964 (age 61); Montreal, Quebec
- Occupation: Actor

Romano Orzari (born 12 December 1964) is a Canadian film and television actor. He played Hoagy Carmichael in Bix (1991), Pvt. Jimmy Rassi in Silent Night (2002), Joey Perrotta in Baby for Sale (2004), and Tom in Mères et filles (2009). On television, he played Domenic Radell in Mutant X (2003), and Ray Prager in the second season of Durham County (2009). He also played Giovanni Auditore, the father of protagonist Ezio Auditore, in the video game Assassin's Creed II (2009) and the live-action short film Assassin's Creed: Lineage (2009). He lives in NY state with his wife and daughter.

== Filmography ==
=== Film ===
- Ordinary Angels (1986) as Fred Kessel
- Even Great Man (1987) as Ray
- Red Earth, White Earth (1989) as Mano
- Day One (1989) as Leo Szilard's Prime Scientist
- Nosferatu (1990) as Walker
- Bix (1991) as Hoagy Carmichael
- Fratelli e sorelle (1992) as Romano
- Lowball (1994) as Romeo
- Echo Off (1994)
- Lowball (1996) as Romeo
- Vertical City (1996) as Gibson
- Astoria Had a Little Lamb (1996) as Yiorgo
- 2 Mayhem 3 (1996) as Ray
- For a Kiss (1997) as Lou
- Burnt Eden (1997) as Ivan
- Bonanno: A Godfather's Story (1999)
- Desert Son (1999) as Rafi
- The List (2000) as Mike Botkin
- Wilder (2000) as Detective Harlan Lee
- Bone (2000) as Paul
- Stiletto Dance (2001) as Jay Flowers
- Des chiens dans la neige (2002) as Marco
- One Way Out (2002) as Carlos La Barra
- Silent Night (2002) as Pvt. Jimmy Rassi
- Bugs (2003) as Garcia
- E.D.N.Y. (2003) as Detective John Kavalos
- Baby for Sale (2004) as Joey Perrotta
- The Overlookers (2004) as Max Case
- Eternal (2004) as Detective Angie Manning
- Pure (2005) as Jack's Father
- Banshee (2006) as Eddie Rindall
- The Last Hit Man (2008) as Billy Rosco
- Punisher: War Zone (2008) as Nicky
- 24 Hour Rental (2008) as Tracker
- 3 saisons (2009) as Carmine Pelligrini
- Out of Control (2009) as John Tucci
- Mères et filles (2009) as Tom
- Assassin's Creed: Lineage (2009) as Giovanni Auditore
- False Creek Stories (2010) as Igor
- The Bait (L'Appât) (2010) as Mario
- Immortals (2011) as Icarus
- Uncontrollable (2012) as Richard
- Colonia V (2013) as Reynolds
- White House Down (2013) as Mulcahy
- Hot Dog (2013) as Tony
- Gibraltar (2013) as Le Colosse
- Turbo Kid (2015) as Bagu
- The Forbidden Room (2015) as Squid Thief / Madman / Dr. Moarte-Joc
- Gridlocked (2015) as Dallas
- Prisoner X (2016) as Prisoner X / Ramiro
- Love You Like Christmas (2016) as Detective Robert Warren
- Kin (2018) as Lee Jacobs
- Red Wine (2019) as Edmond
- Pastalight (2019) as Salvadore Brunelleschi
- Northern Shade (2021) as Billy
- Clive Boomer's Success as Peter Pisa

=== Television series ===
- Ghost Stories (1997) as Vinnie
- Omertà – Le dernier des hommes d'honneur (1999) as Nicky Balsamo
- Misguided Angels (1999)
- Dice (2001) as Lloyd
- Mutant X (2003) as Domenic Rydell
- Petits mythes urbains (2003) as Martin
- Il duce canadese (2004) as Vince
- Un homme mort (2006) as Angel Porquito
- Level 9 (2008) as Alex Veedy
- Durham County (2009) as Ray Prager
- The Listener (2011) as Jack Nassiter
- Nikita (2011) as General Valeri Ovechkin
- Les Jeunes Loups (2014) as Stéfano Bertoni
- 24 Hour Rental (2014) as Tracker
- Reign (2014) as Summoner
- Gangland Undercover (2015) as Bernard
- The Art of More (2015–2016) as Detective Raymond Washington
- Taken (2017) as Carlos Mejia
- Bad Blood (2017–2018) as Toto Bianchi
- Hudson & Rex (2020) as Frank Deangelis

=== Video games ===
- Assassin's Creed II (2009) as Giovanni Auditore
- Thief (2014) as Garrett

== Bibliography ==
- Terrace, Vincent (23 April 2021). Television Movies of the 21st Century. McFarland. p. 404. ISBN 9781476684123.
