= 24 Hour Rental =

Canadian television sitcom

- Genre: Sitcom; Black comedy
- Created by: Frank MaSSa
- Written by: Frank MaSSa, Al Kratina
- Directed by: George Mihalka
- Starring: Romano Orzari; Aaron Berg; Michael Biehn; Adam Kenneth Wilson; Vlasta Vrana; Gavin Crawford
- Composer: Ian LeFeuvre
- Country of origin: Canada
- Original language: English
- No. of seasons: 1
- No. of episodes: 13

Production
- Production locations: Hamilton, Ontario
- Running time: 30mins

Original release
- Network: Super Channel
- Release: February 18 – May 13, 2013

24 Hour Rental is a Canadian television comedy series created by Frank Massa, which premiered on Super Channel in 2013. The series stars Romano Orzari as Tracker, a disgraced former mafia boss now running a 24-hour video rental shop which is really a front for his continued attempts to reestablish his power in the organized crime circuit. The core cast also includes Aaron Berg, Adam Kenneth Wilson, Michael Biehn, Marc Senior, Kate Ross, Leslie Seiler and Gavin Crawford, with supporting performers including Vlasta Vrana, Aidan Devine, Salvatore Antonio, Joe Pingue, Judah Katz, Mike Smith, and Simon D. Scott.

The series is filmed in Hamilton, Ontario.
