= Great Kite =

Wooden machine designed by Leonardo da Vinci

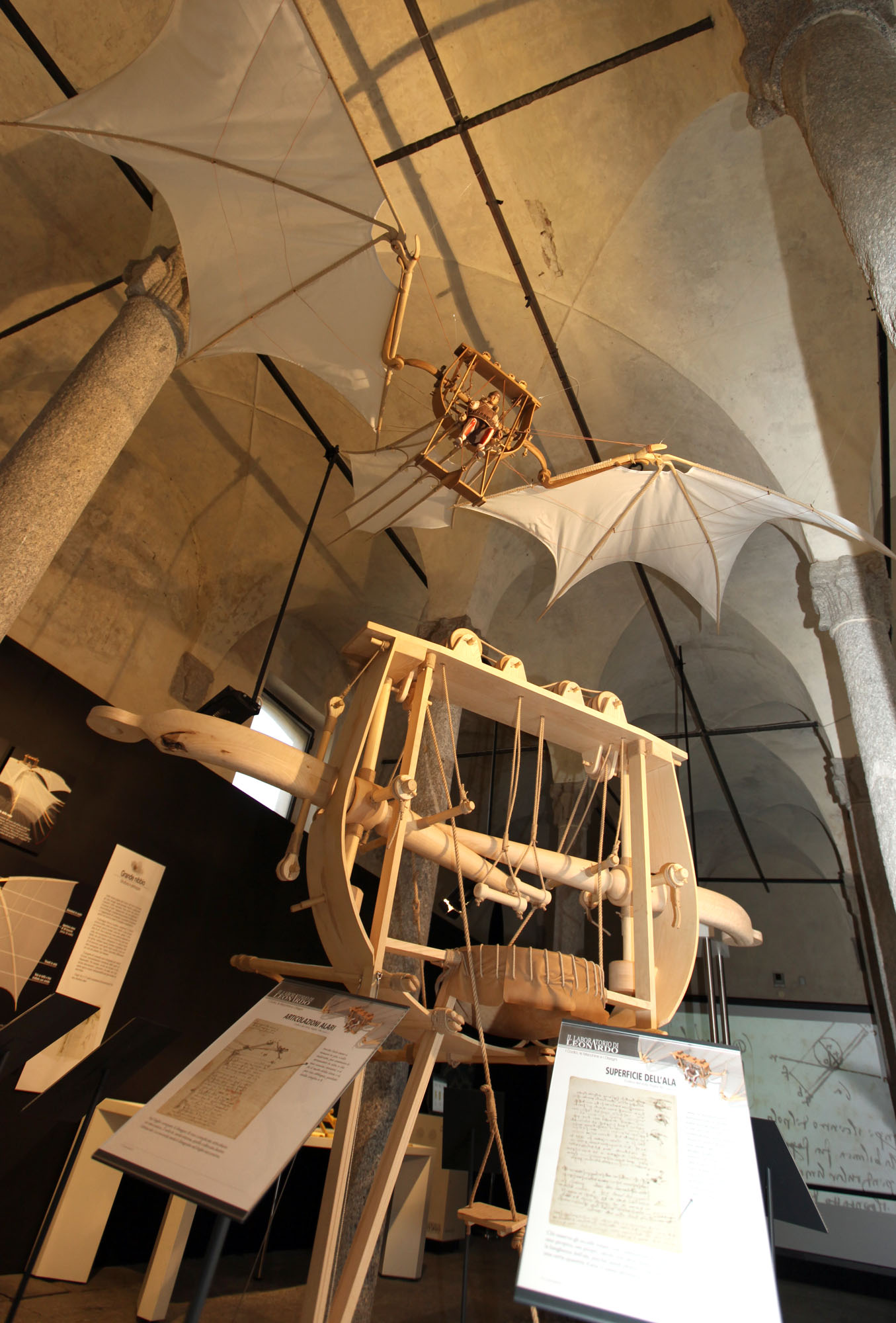
The Great Kite, Leonardo's flying machine in codex on flight

The Great Kite (Italian: il Grande Nibbio) was a wooden machine designed by Leonardo da Vinci. Leonardo realized it between the end of the 15th Century and the beginning of the 16th Century. Drawings of parts and components of this machine can be found in the Codex on the flight of birds, which however lacks the overall description of the machine itself. Some drawings within the same codex suggest that it was created in similarity with flapping flight. However, this was hardly possible to perform given the available technologies, thus Leonardo developed a machine for mainly a gliding flight. The machine is named after the animal from which Leonardo took inspiration to realize the flying machine, the Kite.

== In-Media Appearances ==
- The Great Kite makes an appearance in Mr. Peabody & Sherman.
- The Great Kite appears as a Lego set released in 2025.
- A variant of the Great Kite appears as a plot device in the Star Trek Voyager episode “Concerning Flight,” where a holographic replica of Da Vinci is a supporting character.

== See also ==
- List of works by Leonardo da Vinci
- Science and inventions of Leonardo da Vinci
