= Pierre Curzi =

Canadian politician, actor, and screenwriter (born 1946)

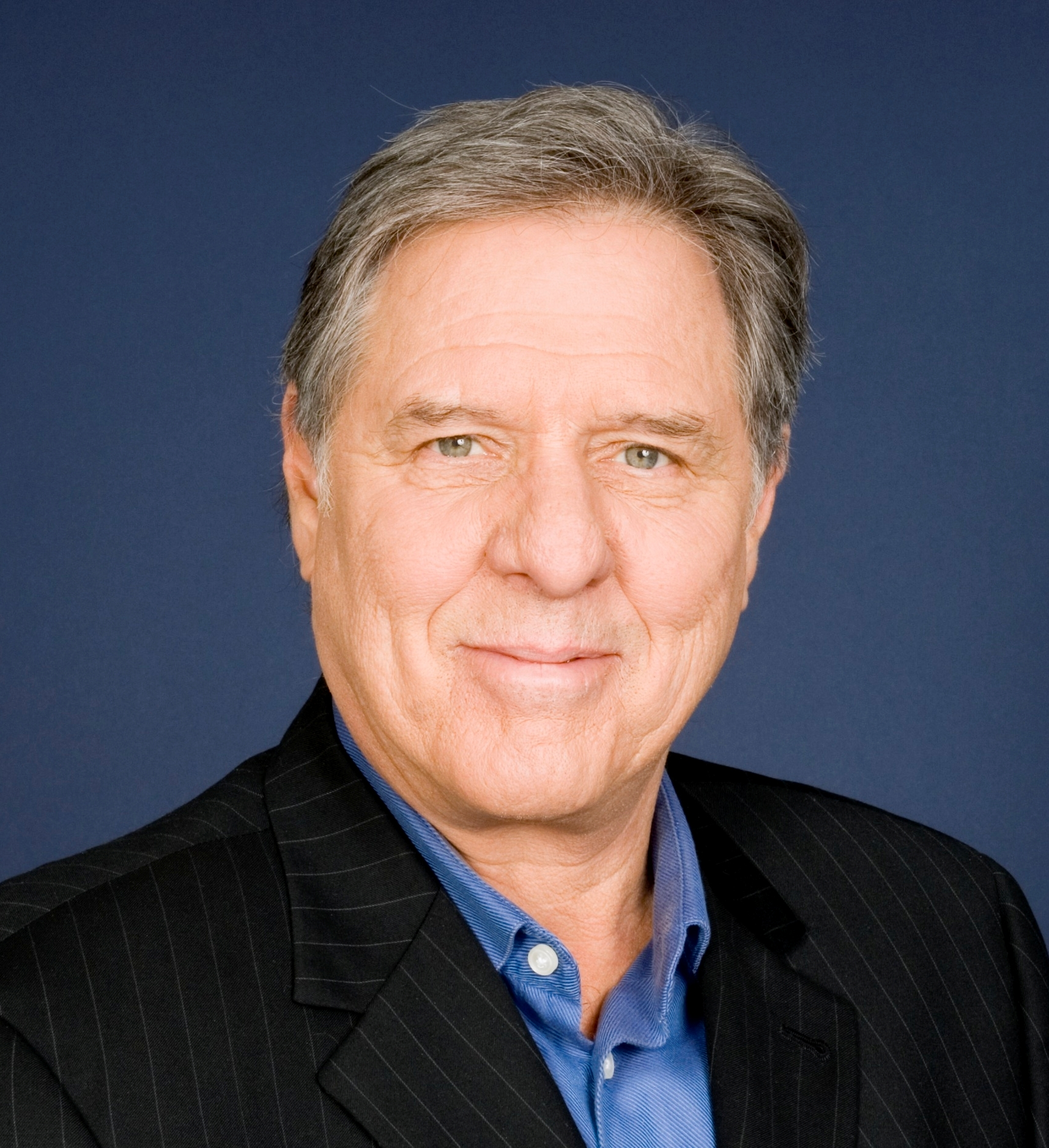

Member of the National Assembly for Borduas
- In office April 25, 2007 – September 4, 2012
- Preceded by: Jean-Pierre Charbonneau
- Succeeded by: Pierre Duchesne

Personal details
- Born: February 11, 1946 (age 80) Montreal, Quebec, Canada
- Party: Independent
- Other political affiliations: Parti Québécois (until 2011)
- Spouse: Marie Tifo
- Profession: Actor, Screenwriter, Unionist
- Portfolio: Culture, Communications, Language

Pierre Curzi (born February 11, 1946, in Montreal, Quebec) is a Canadian actor, screenwriter and politician in Quebec. He is a former Member of the National Assembly of Quebec (MNA) for the riding of Borduas in the Montérégie region south of Montreal. Elected under the Parti Québécois (PQ) banner, he later sat as an independent.

== Politics ==
Curzi entered politics when he announced his candidacy for the riding of Borduas in the 2007 provincial elections, following the retirement of Jean-Pierre Charbonneau. He defeated the Action démocratique du Québec's Claude Gauthier by over 2,000 votes. He was later named the PQ critic for culture, communications and language.

Curzi was forced to apologize and retract a statement he made in October 2007 during a radio interview that appeared to suggest that a sovereign Quebec would have "more teeth" and could potentially remove the voting rights of Quebec's English-speaking community living on Montreal's West Island. He faced some criticism in 2008 as one of two MNAs, along with Daniel Turp, who endorsed a controversial petition opposing Paul McCartney's performance at Quebec City's 400th anniversary celebrations. In September 2010, Curzi expressed on the television interview show Les Francs-tireurs his theory that there was a shortage of Francophone players on the National Hockey League team the Montreal Canadiens and that this was "damned well political" and the result of a federalist plot.

On June 6, 2011, Curzi and caucus mates Louise Beaudoin and Lisette Lapointe resigned from the Parti Québécois to sit as independents over the PQ's acceptance of a bill changing the law to permit an agreement between the City of Québec and Quebecor Inc. concerning the construction of an arena in Quebec City.

== Acting and screenplay career ==
Curzi went to the École nationale de Théâtre in 1969. Prior to his political career, he played in numerous popular Quebec movies, plays, television shows and documentaries including We Are Far from the Sun (On est loin du soleil), Duplessis, Maria Chapdelaine, The Crime of Ovide Plouffe (Le Crime d'Ovide Plouffe), Babylone, Les Filles de Caleb, Million Dollar Babies, Virginie, Suzanne, Caffè Italia, Montréal, Exit, Matroni and Me (Matroni et moi), The Barbarian Invasions, Tideline (Littoral), Chili's Blues (C'était le 12 du 12, et Chili avait les blues), Le Négociateur, The New Life of Paul Sneijder (La nouvelle vie de Paul Sneijder) and Romeo and Juliet.

Overall, he played roles in about 50 productions since 1971 and had been nominated for four Genie Awards for his roles in Maria Chapdelaine (1983), Lucien Brouillard (1983) and The Decline of the American Empire (Le Déclin de l'empire américain) (1986) and a nomination for best screenplay for Intimate Power (Pouvoir intime) in 1986.

He was also the president of the Union des artistes for eight years. The UDA is the main union group for cinema, theatre and television actors in Quebec.

He is married to Marie Tifo, an actress with whom he costarred in the films Red Eyes (Les Yeux rouges), Lucien Brouillard, Le jour S... and Intimate Power

== Electoral record ==
2008 Quebec general election: Borduas
Party	Candidate	Votes	%	±%
Parti Québécois	Pierre Curzi	13,329	47.66	+8.90
Liberal	Jacques Charbonneau	9,125	32.63	+10.95
Action démocratique	Jean Dion	3,430	12.26	−19.05
Québec solidaire	Éric Noël	966	3.45	+0.53
Green	Marco Caron	904	3.23	−1.28
Parti indépendantiste	Michel Lepage	214	0.77	-
Total valid votes		27,968	98.30	
Rejected and declined votes		485	1.70	
Turnout		28,453	65.87	−13.71
Electors on the lists		43,198		
Source: Official Results, Le Directeur général des élections du Québec.

2007 Quebec general election: Borduas
Party	Candidate	Votes	%	±%
Parti Québécois	Pierre Curzi	12,529	38.76	−8.06
Action démocratique	Claude Gauthier	10,123	31.31	+13.44
Liberal	Jacques Charbonneau	7,010	21.68	−12.08
Green	Olivier Adam	1,459	4.51	–
Québec solidaire	Julie Raby	944	2.92	–
Independent	Super Cauchon	262	0.81	–
Total valid votes		32,327	99.12	–
Total rejected ballots		286	0.88	–
Turnout		32,613	79.58	+1.74
Electors on the lists		40,980	–	–
Source: Official Results, Le Directeur général des élections du Québec.

== Filmography ==
- 1964 : Trouble-Maker (Trouble fête)
- 1971 : We Are Far from the Sun (On est loin du soleil) : Yvon
- 1973 : You Are Warm, You Are Warm (Tu brûles... tu brûles...)
- 1973 : The Paths of the World (Les Allées de la terre) : Antoine
- 1975 : Confidences of the Night (L'Amour blessé)
- 1976 : Let's Talk About Love (Parlez-nous d'amour)
- 1980 : Fantastica : André
- 1980 : Suzanne : Pierre
- 1981 : The Plouffe Family (Les Plouffe) : Napoléon Plouffe
- 1982 : Wild Flowers (Les Fleurs sauvages) : Pierre Dubuc
- 1982 : Red Eyes (Les Yeux rouges) : Bertrand Houle
- 1983 : Lucien Brouillard : Lucien Brouillard
- 1983 : Maria Chapdelaine : Eutrope Gagnon
- 1984 : Le jour S... : Jean-Baptiste Beauregard
- 1984 : The Crime of Ovide Plouffe (Le Crime d'Ovide Plouffe) : Napoléon Plouffe
- 1985 : Le Million tout-puissant
- 1986 : Evixion
- 1986 : Intimate Power (Pouvoir intime) : Gildor
- 1986 : The Decline of the American Empire (Le Déclin de l'empire américain) : Pierre
- 1988 : You're Beautiful, Jeanne (T'es belle Jeanne) : Paul
- 1989 : In the Belly of the Dragon (Dans le ventre du dragon)
- 1990 : Babylone : Luigi
- 1993 : April One : Jean Leduc
- 1994 : Chili's Blues (C'était le 12 du 12 et Chili avait les blues) : Monsieur CN
- 1996 : A Cry in the Night (Le Cri de la nuit) : Pierre
- 1999 : Matroni and Me (Matroni et moi) : M. Larochelle
- 2003 : The Barbarian Invasions (Les Invasions barbares) : Pierre
- 2003 : 1604 : De Monts
- 2004 : La Pension des étranges
- 2004 : How to Conquer America in One Night (Comment conquérir l'Amérique en une nuit)
- 2004 : Tideline (Littoral) : Policier Turcot
- 2005 : Idole instantanée : Gaétan Lemieux
- 2006 : Roméo et Juliette : Paul Véronneau
- 2007 : Days of Darkness (L'Âge des ténèbres) : Pierre
- 2013 : Manigances : Notice Rouge : Georges Paoli
- 2016 : The New Life of Paul Sneijder (La Nouvelle Vie de Paul Sneijder) : Maître Wagner-Leblond
- 2015 : Chorus : Jérôme
- 2018 : The Fall of the American Empire (La Chute de l'empire américain) : Maître Wilbrod Taschereau
- 2020 : Old Buddies (Les Vieux chums)
- 2021 : A Revision (Une révision)
- 2021 : Joutel
- 2023 : Testament
- 2025 : Cardboard City (Ville Jacques-Carton)

== Television ==
- 1975 : Youhou : Michel
- 1978 : Duplessis : Reporter
- 1979 : Riel : Isidore
- 1980 : Frédéric : Biker Leader
- 1984 : Le Parc des braves : Major Paul Bérubé
- 1985 : Un amour de quartier : Speedy Joe
- 1986 : Des dames de cœur : François O'Neil
- 1989 : Miléna Nova Tremblay : François Tremblay
- 1989 : Super sans plomb : J.-P. St-Onge
- 1989 : Un signe de feu : François O'Neil
- 1990 : Les Filles de Caleb : Dosithée Pronovost
- 1992 : Les Intrépides
- 1992 : Montréal P.Q. : Paulus Quintal
- 1992 : Les Cravates léopards : Vermontier
- 1993 : Shehaweh : Sieur de Maisonneuve
- 1993 : Les Grands Procès : Me Robert Calder
- 1994 : Cœur à prendre : Vincent, Bouquet
- 1994 : Les Jumelles Dionne (tv movie) : Alphonse Fortier
- 1995 : Jalna : Greg
- 1996 : Marguerite Volant : Renaud Larochelle
- 1997 : Le Masque : Victor Thibault
- 1996 : Virginie : Gilles Bazinet (1997-2002)
- 2004 : Smash : Bernier Fafard
- 2005 : Providence : Jean-Guy Bélanger
- 2005 : Le Négociateur : Maurice Martel
- 2007 : Les Invincibles : Gene
- 2010 : La Promesse : Daniel (Nurse)
- 2014 : Nouvelle Adresse : Gérard Lapointe
- 2014 : Mensonges : D^{r} Michel Pelletier (Psychiatrist)
- 2015 : O' : Richard
- 2018 : Appelle-moi si tu meurs : Cesare Ciccarelli

== Theatre ==
- 2006: août (Jean Marc Dalpé)
- 2005: La Tempête (William Shakespeare)
- 2005: Coin St-Laurent
- 2002: La Nuit des rois (William Shakespeare)
- 2001: L'Hiver de force (Réjean Ducharme)
- 2001: Le Mouton et la Baleine (Ahmed Ghazali)
- 1999: Trick or treat (Jean Marc Dalpé)
- 1998: Le miroir aux tartuffes (Jean-Claude Germain)
- 1997: Chrysanthème (Eugène Lion)
- 1995: Mère Courage (Bertolt Brecht)
- 1994: La Mouette (Anton Tchekhov)
- 1993: La Reprise (Claude Gauvreau)
- 1992: Six personnages en quête d'auteur (Luigi Pirandello)
- 1992: Conte d'Hiver (Anne Legault)
- 1991: Shakespeare, un monde qu'on peut apprendre par cœur (Michel Garneau)
- 1989: La Nuit du 16 janvier (Ayn Rand)
- 1988: Le Baiser de la Femme Araignée (Manuel Puig)
- 1988: Cendres (David Rudkin)
- 1986: Deux sur la Balançoire (W. Gibson)
- 1986: Avec Lorenzo à mes Côtés (Grand Cirque ordinaire inspired from Musset)
- 1984: En attendant Godot (Samuel Beckett)
- 1984: Mère Courage (Bertolt Brecht)
- 1984: Le Tir à Blanc (André Ricard)
- 1979: Le Théâtre de la Maintenance (Jean Barbeau)
- 1978: L'Abécédaire Conditionnel (Michel Garneau)
- 1978: Les Fiancés de Rose Latulipe (Grand Cirque ordinaire)
- 1977: Les Nerfs à l'Air (Collective)
- 1977: L'Impromptu chez M. R. Pantalon
- 1976: La Steppette Impossible
- 1975: La Tragédie Américaine de l'Enfant Prodigue (Collective)
- 1975: Colette et Pérusse (Robert Claing)
- 1975: Une Brosse (Jean Barbeau)
- 1974: Floralie (Roch Carrier)
- 1974: Salut Galarneau (Jacques Godbout and D. Chouinard)
- 1973: Don Quichotte (Jean-Pierre Ronfard, adapted from Cervantes)
- 1973: Galipotte 8 (Robert Gravel)
- 1972: Les Oranges sont vertes (Claude Gauvreau)
- 1972: Sparages (Marcel Sabourin)
- 1971: Les Fourberies de Scapin (Molière)
- 1971: Chiniqui (Collective)
- 1970: Chmou (Pierre Bégin and Pierre Collin)
- 1970: La Guerre Yes Sir (Roch Carrier)
- 1969: Gens de Noël, Tremblez!, (Collective)
- 1969: À Cœur Ouvert (Robert Gurick)
- 1969: P.O.T. T.V., (Collective)

== Note ==
The Sections Filmography, Television and Theatre were copied and adapted from the French Wikipedia Page of Pierre Curzi. See that page's history for attribution.
