= Borduas (disambiguation) =

Borduas is a provincial electoral district in Quebec.

Borduas may also refer to:

- Chambly—Borduas, a federal electoral district in Quebec

== People with the surname ==
- Paul-Émile Borduas, Canadian abstract painter
