= In the Belly of the Dragon =

- French: Dans le ventre du dragon
- Directed by: Yves Simoneau
- Written by: Marcel Beaulieu; Pierre Revelin; Yves Simoneau
- Produced by: Michel Gauthier
- Starring: David La Haye; Rémy Girard; Michel Côté; Monique Mercure; Marie Tifo
- Cinematography: Alain Dostie
- Edited by: André Corriveau
- Music by: Richard Grégoire
- Production companies: Les Films Lenox; Les Productions Québec-Amérique
- Distributed by: Alliance Films
- Release date: February 14, 1989
- Running time: 100 minutes
- Country: Canada
- Language: French
- Box office: C$1.16 million (Canada)

In the Belly of the Dragon (French: Dans le ventre du dragon) is a Canadian comedy science fiction film, directed by Yves Simoneau and released in 1989. The film stars David La Haye as Lou, an aimless slacker who is dissatisfied with his job distributing flyers around the city, and signs up to be a drug testing subject for two mysterious scientists (Monique Mercure and Marie Tifo); meanwhile, his delivery colleagues Steve (Rémy Girard) and Bozo (Michel Côté) must team up to find and rescue him before the medical experiments go horribly wrong.

The cast also includes Andrée Lachapelle, Pierre Curzi, Jean-Louis Millette, Roy Dupuis, Angèle Coutu, Suzanne Champagne and Pierrette Robitaille.

== Reception ==
The film set what was at the time Quebec's all-time record for box office receipts in the first three days of release and was the third-highest-grossing film in Canada for the year with a gross of C$1.16 million.

Simoneau subsequently moved into English-language film and television production, and did not make another French-language film for the Quebec market until The Bait (L'Appât) in 2010.

== Award ==
Paul Dion received a Genie Award nomination for Best Sound Editing at the 11th Genie Awards in 1990.
