= Saint-Marc-sur-Richelieu =

- Municipality
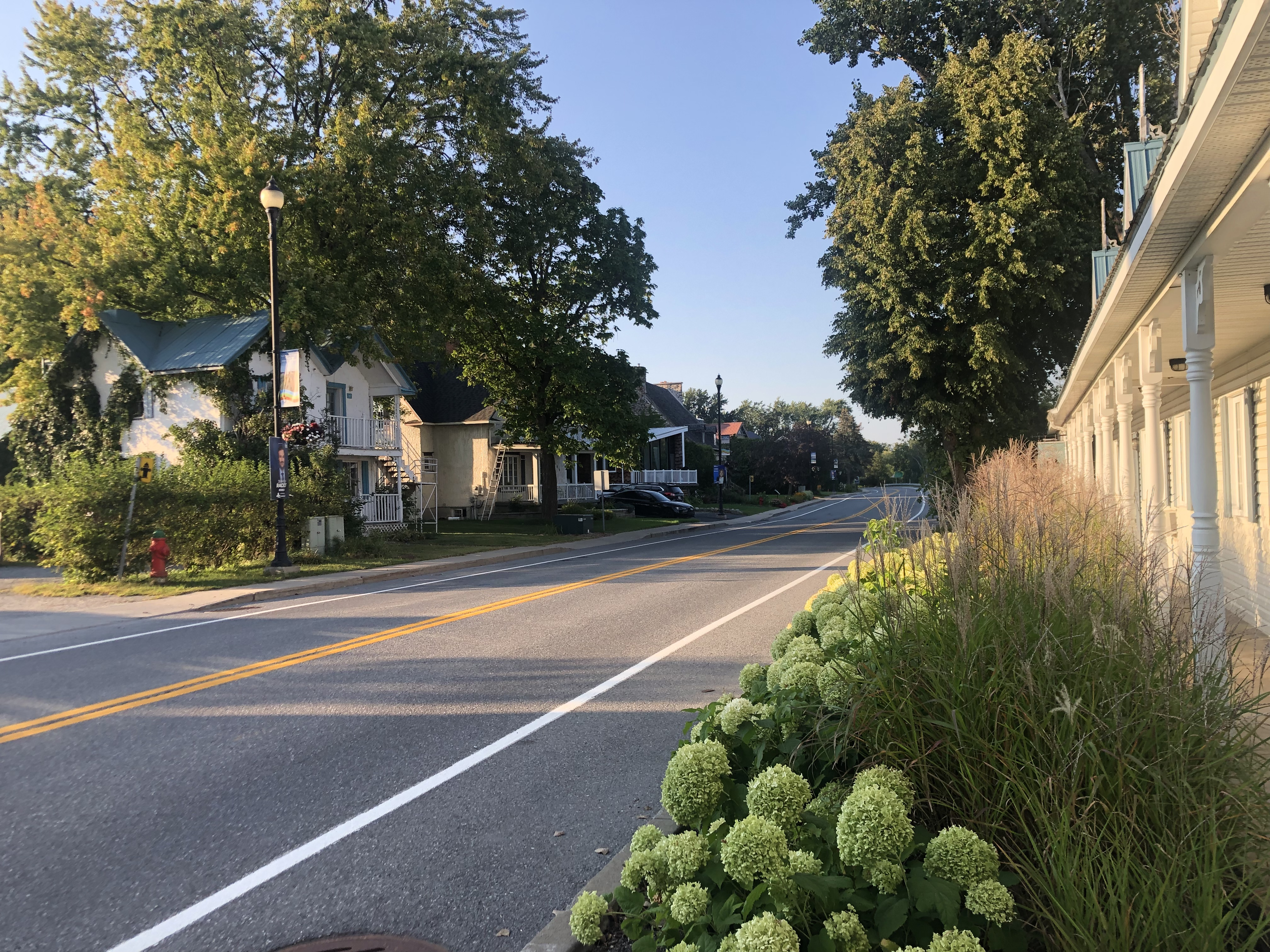
- Road 223 in Saint-Marc-sur-Richelieu

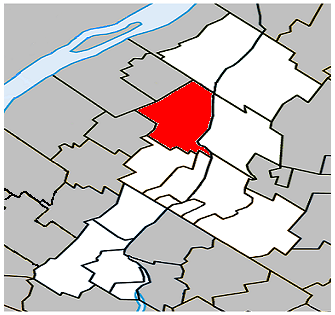
- Location within La Vallée-du-Richelieu RCM.

- Location in southern Quebec.
- Coordinates (<): 45°41′N 73°12′W
- Country: Canada
- Province: Quebec
- Region: Montérégie
- RCM: La Vallée-du-Richelieu
- Constituted: July 1, 1855
- Named for: Mark the Evangelist and Richelieu River

Government
  - Mayor: Alain Lavallée
  - Federal riding: Pierre-Boucher—Les Patriotes—Verchères
  - Prov. riding: Borduas

Area
  - Total: 62.40 km^{2} (24.09 sq mi)
  - Land: 60.92 km^{2} (23.52 sq mi)

Population (2021)
  - Total: 2,245
  - Density: 36.9/km^{2} (96/sq mi)
  - Pop 2016-2021: ▲3.4%
  - Dwellings: 908
- Time zone: UTC−5 (EST)
  - Summer (DST): UTC−4 (EDT)
- Postal code(s): J0L 2E0
- Area codes: 450 and 579
- Highways: R-223
- Website: www.ville.saint-marc- sur-richelieu.qc.ca

Saint-Marc-sur-Richelieu (French pronunciation: [sɛ̃ maʁk syʁ ʁiʃ(ə)ljø], lit. 'Saint-Marc on Richelieu') is a municipality in southwestern Quebec, Canada, on the Richelieu River in the Regional County Municipality of La Vallée-du-Richelieu. The population as of the Canada 2021 Census was 2,245.

== History ==
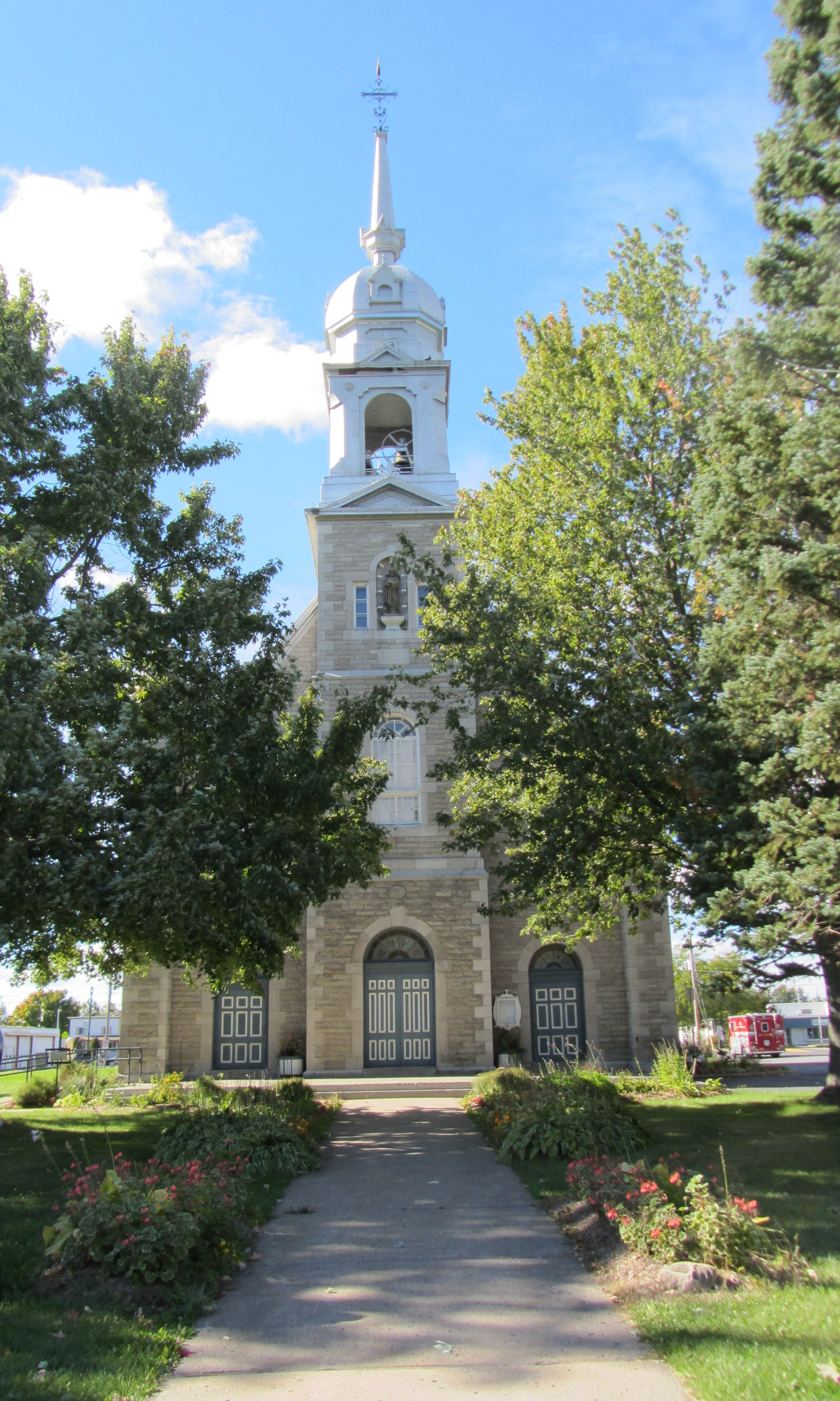
Parish Church

In its origin, the municipality was simply named: Saint-Marc. In 1921, the municipality lost an important part of its territory for the creation of the new municipality of Saint-Amable. In 1980, the municipality of Saint-Marc changed its name to the current name of Saint-Marc-sur-Richelieu.

On October 10, 2012, the municipality was reportedly the epicenter of an earthquake measuring 4.5 on the Richter scale.

== Geography ==
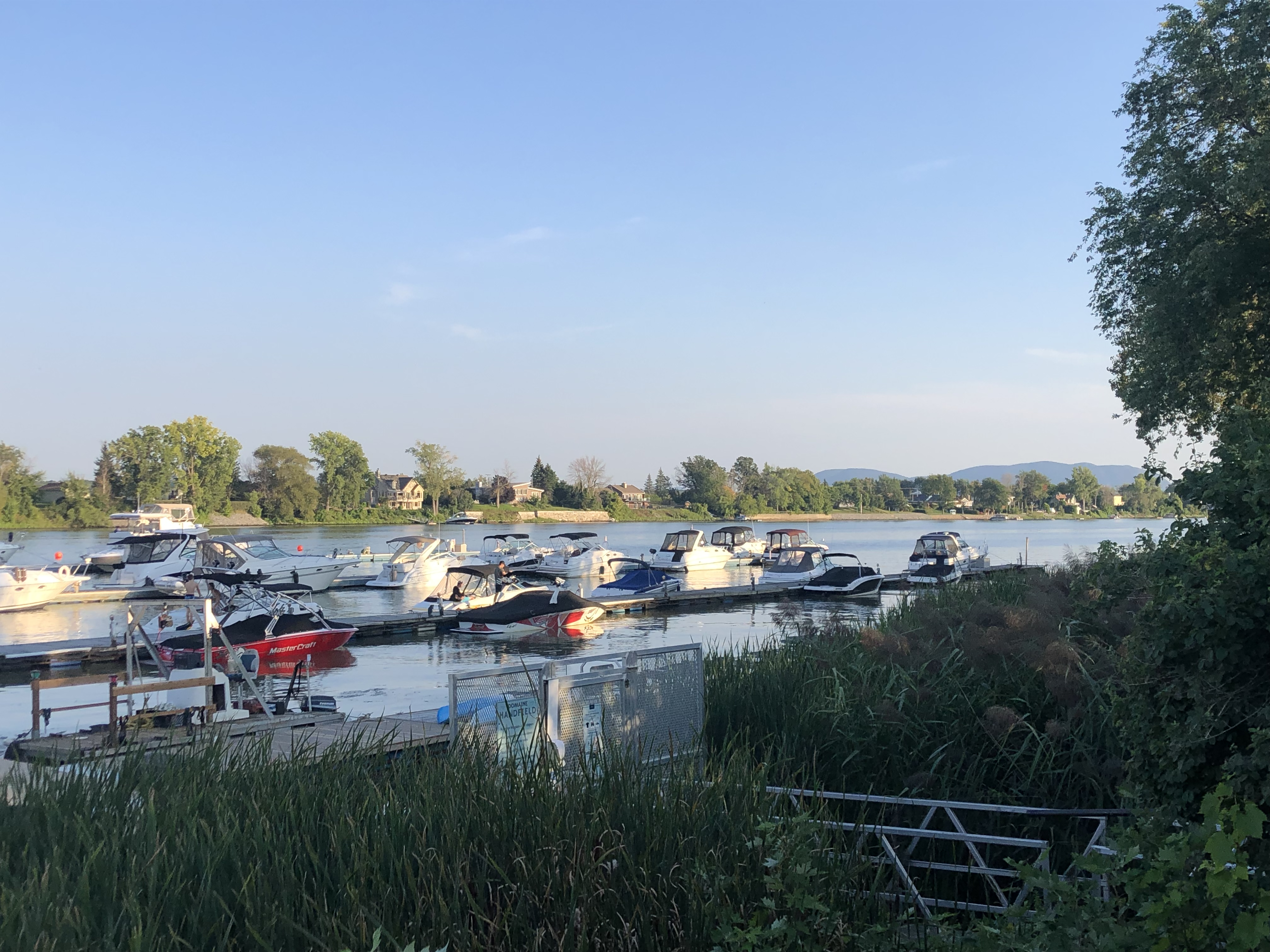
Richelieu River

The Richelieu River forms the eastern boundary of the municipality as it flows northwards.

== Demographics ==
=== Population ===
Population trend:

Census	Population	Change (%)
2021	2,245	▲3.4%
2016	2,172	▲6.0%
2011	2,050	▲9.3%
2006	1,876	▼4.1%
2001	1,957	▼2.1%
1996	1,999	▲8.0%
1991	1,851	▲12.8%
1986	1,641	▲6.2%
1981	1,545	▲32.3%
1976	1,168	▲19.4%
1971	978	▲6.1%
1966	922	▲3.5%
1961	891	▼6.4%
1956	952	▲6.6%
1951	893	▼0.9%
1941	901	▲2.0%
1931	883	▼3.8%
1921	918	▼3.4%
1911	956	▼1.2%
1901	968	▲7.9%
1891	897	▼13.4%
1881	1,036	▼7.3%
1871	1,117	▼18.1%
1861	1,364	N/A

=== Language ===
Mother tongue language (2021)

Language	Population	Pct (%)
French only	2,165	96.4%
English only	35	1.6%
Both English and French	25	1.1%
Other languages	15	0.7%

== Gallery ==
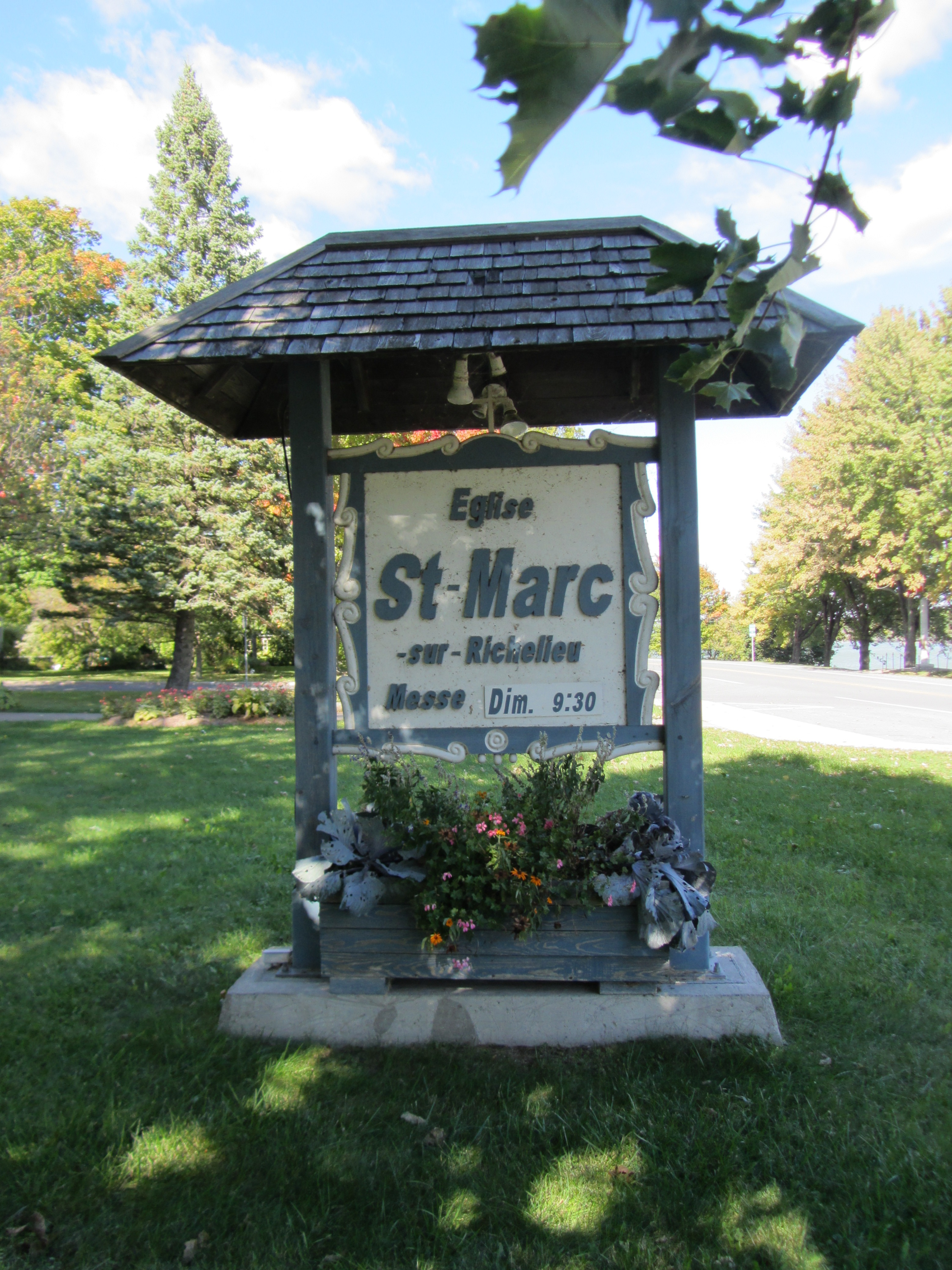
Parish Church Sign

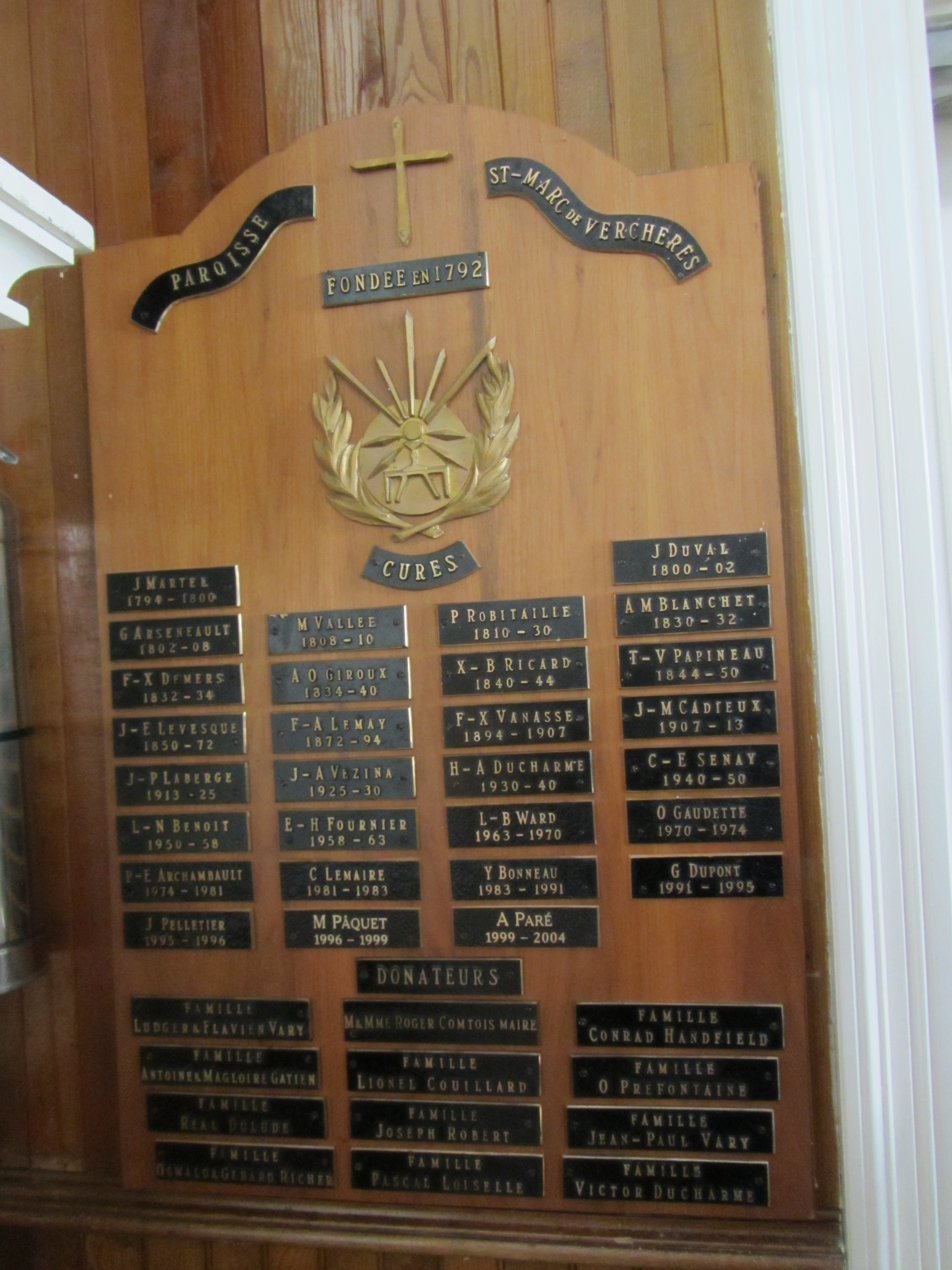
Parish Priests Plaque

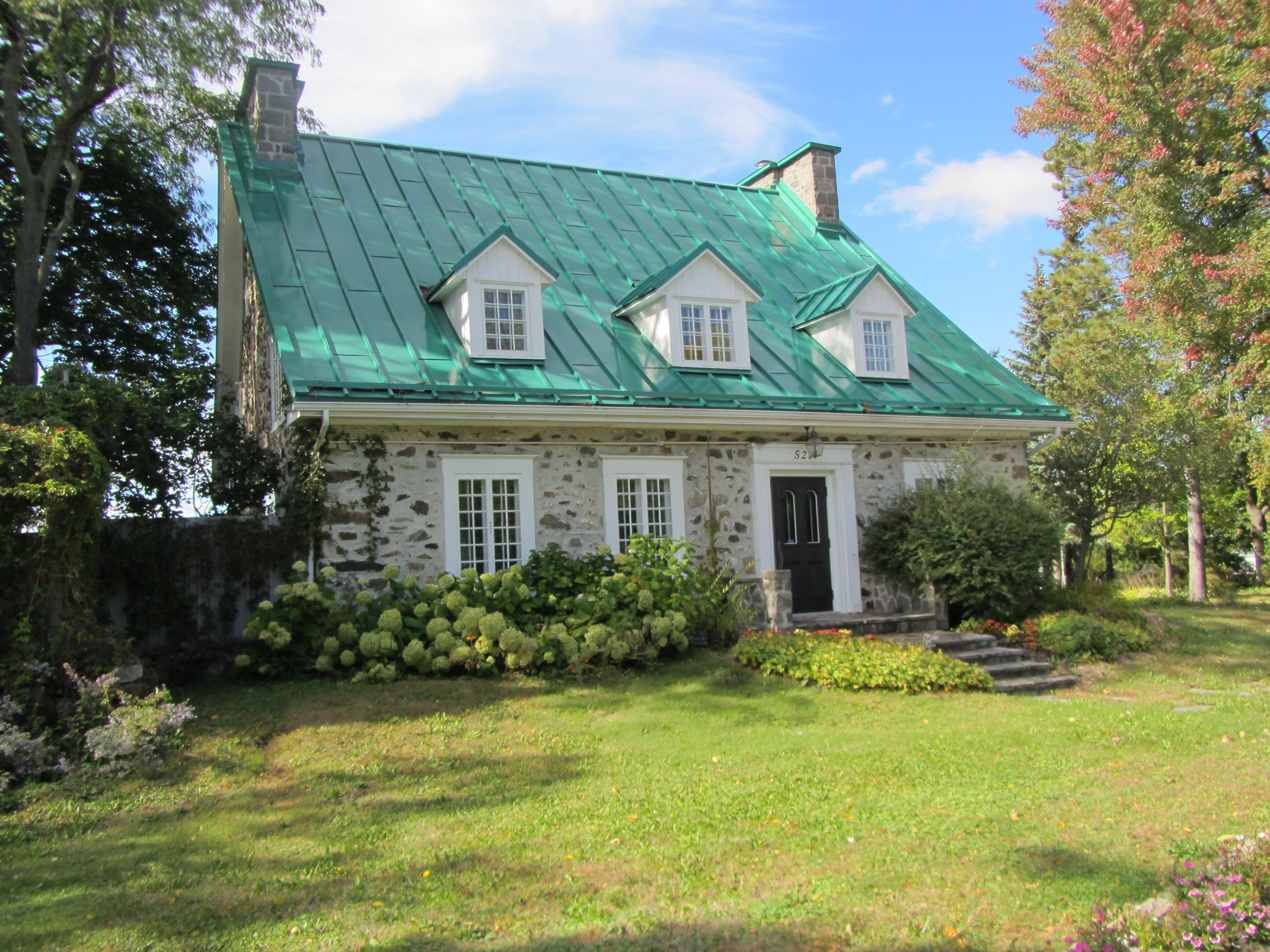
Maison Janotte, 1760

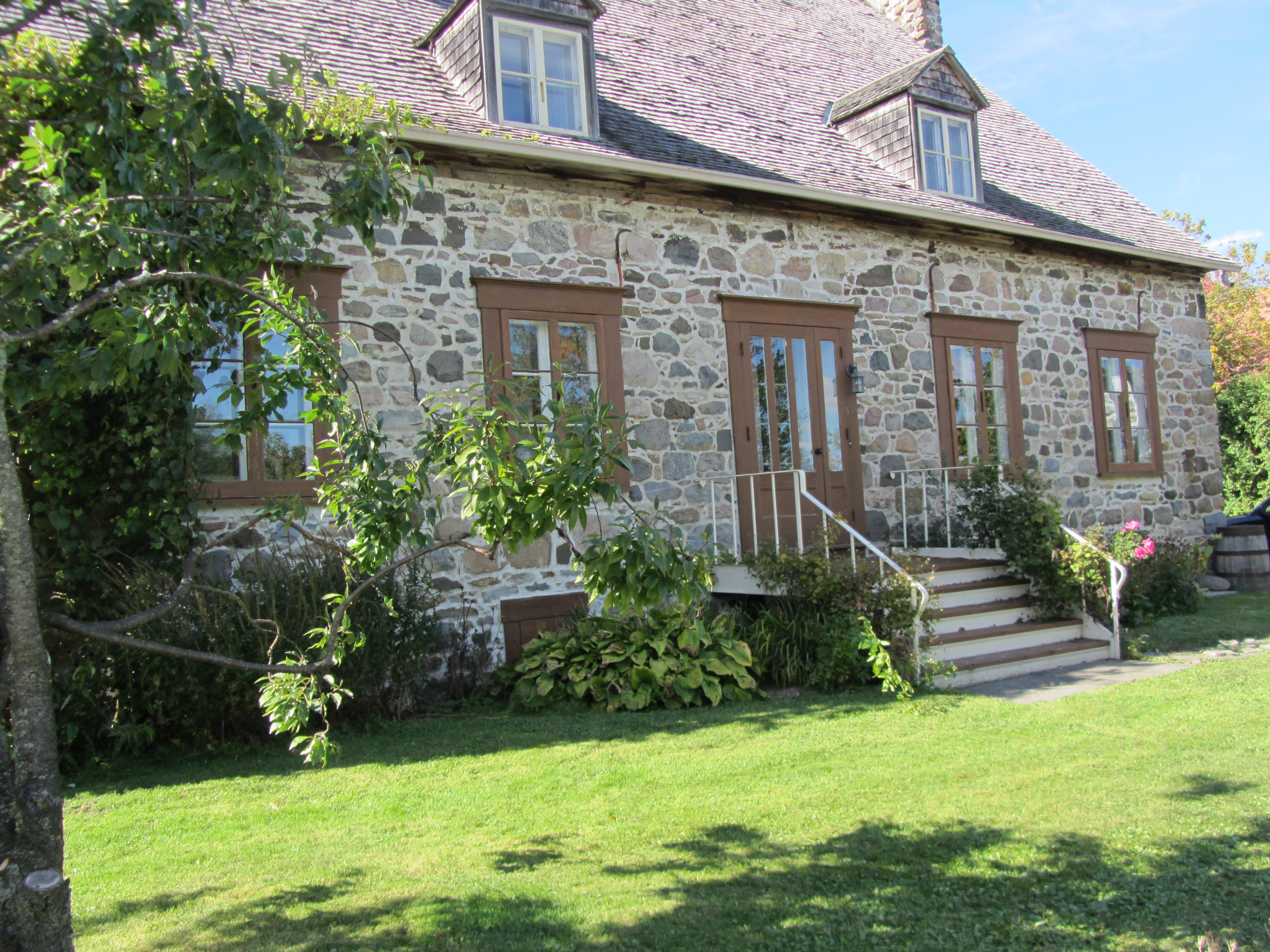
Maison Senecal-Moreau, 1762

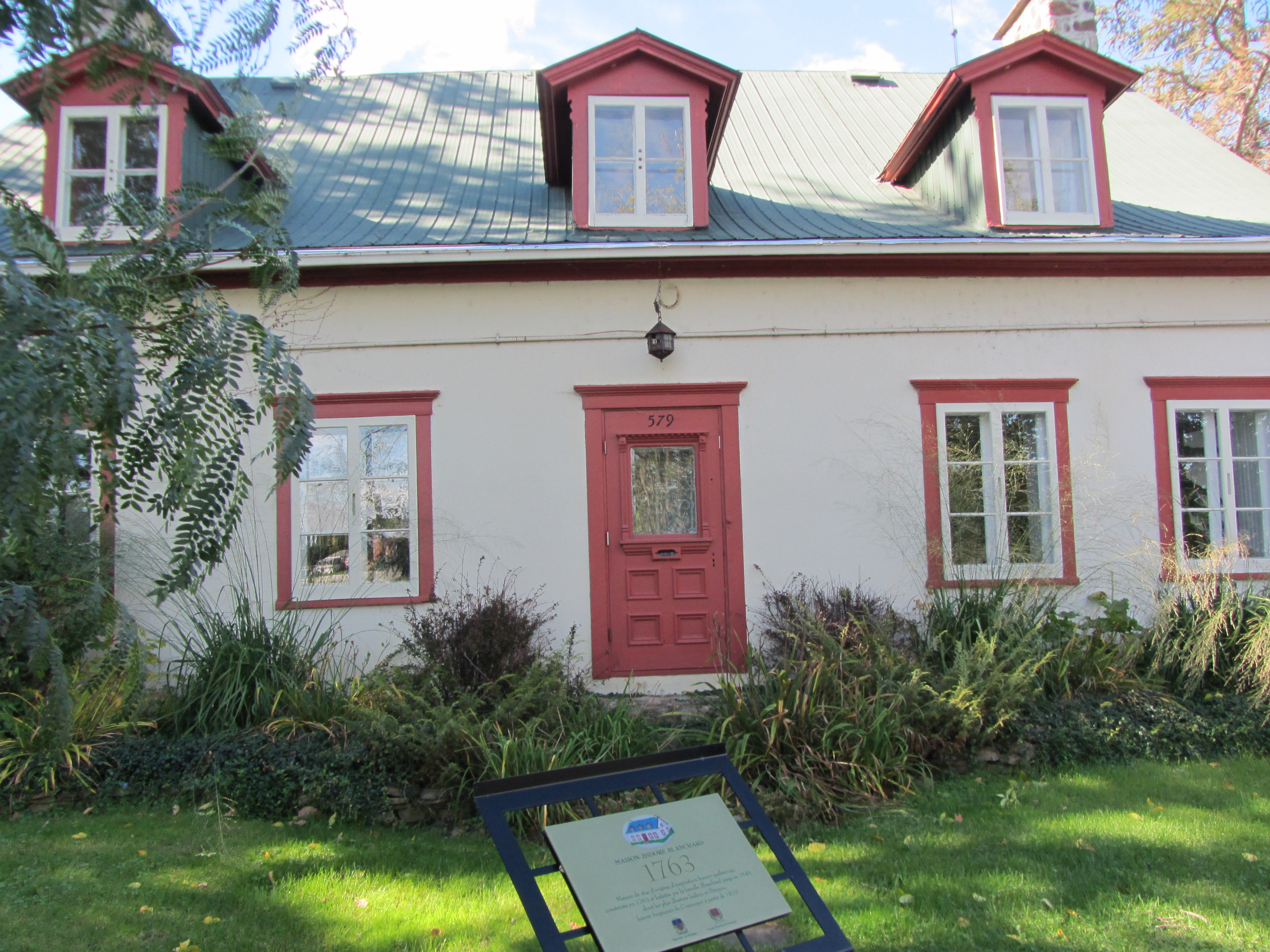
Maison Isidore Blanchard, 1763

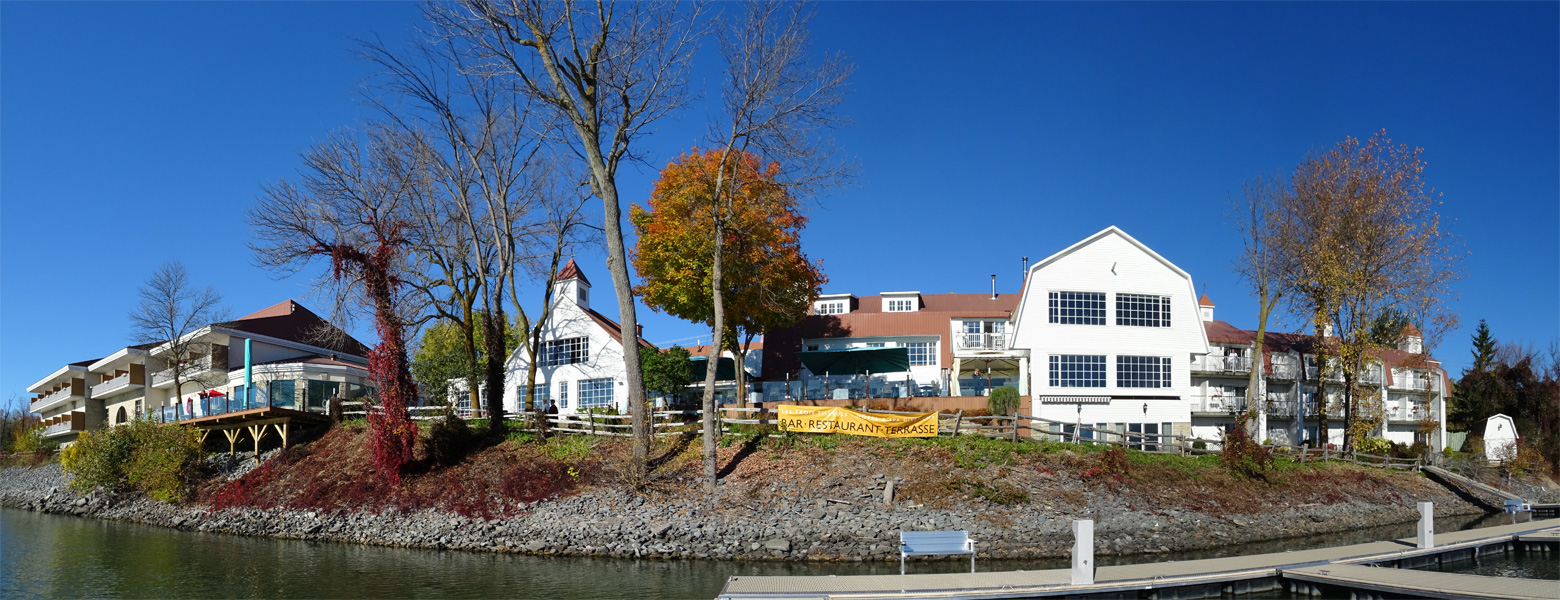
Hôtel Les Trois Tillleuls

== See also ==
- List of municipalities in Quebec
