= We Are Far from the Sun =

1971 Canadian film directed by Jacques Leduc

- French: On est loin du soleil
- Directed by: Jacques Leduc
- Written by: Pierre Maheu; Robert Tremblay
- Produced by: Paul Larose
- Starring: Marthe Nadeau; Pierre Curzi; Willie Lamothe; Marcel Sabourin
- Cinematography: Alain Dostie
- Edited by: Pierre Bernier
- Music by: Michel Robidoux
- Production company: National Film Board of Canada
- Release date: December 24, 1971
- Running time: 79 minutes
- Country: Canada
- Language: French

We Are Far from the Sun (French: On est loin du soleil) is a Canadian drama film, directed by Jacques Leduc and released in 1971. The film centres on the Bessettes, a contemporary working-class family in Montreal who are struggling to make ends meet, through a narrative frame structured around the philosophies and values of influential Québécois religious leader Brother André Bessette.

The film's cast includes Marthe Nadeau, Pierre Curzi, Willie Lamothe, Reynald Bouchard, J.-Léo Gagnon, Claude Jutra, Marcel Sabourin and Esther Auger.

The film was produced and shot in 1970, and released theatrically in 1971.
