= Pierre Duchesne (politician) =

Canadian politician (born 1964)

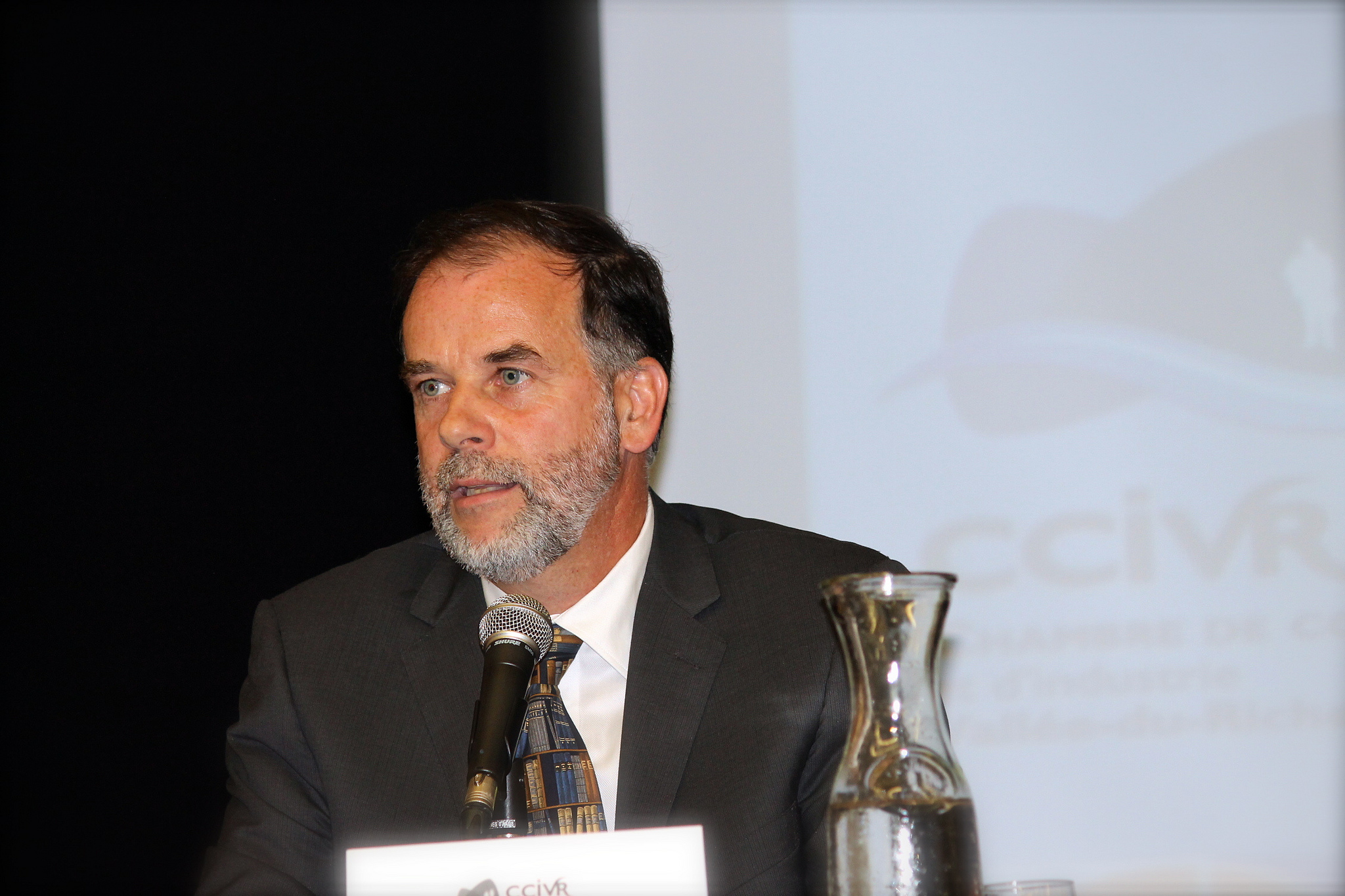
- Pierre Duchesne in 2012

MNA for Borduas
- In office September 4, 2012 – 2014
- Preceded by: Pierre Curzi
- Succeeded by: Simon Jolin-Barrette

Personal details
- Born: August 27, 1964 (age 62) Jonquière, Quebec, Canada
- Party: Parti Québécois
- Profession: Journalist
- Portfolio: Minister of Higher Education, Research, Science and Technology

Pierre Duchesne (born August 27, 1964) is a Canadian radio and television journalist and politician from Quebec. He was a member of the National Assembly of Quebec for the riding of Borduas from 2012 to 2014, first elected in the 2012 election.

== Biography ==
Born in Jonquière, Quebec, Duchesne obtained a bachelor's degree in political science from Université Laval in 1986 and a certificate in journalism in 1988.

=== Career in journalism ===
Duchesne was a radio and television journalist for the Société Radio-Canada from 1990 to 2012. He was radio journalist (1990-1996) and reporter (1996-2001) for the Première Chaîne, reporter (2001-2004) and Investigative journalist (2004-2005) for Radio-Canada television, Parliamentary correspondent in Québec (2005-2012) and Political analyst for Radio-Canada television in Québec (2010-2012).

=== Politics ===
After retiring from journalism, he entered politics and he was elected member of the National Assembly of Quebec for the riding of Borduas in the September 4, 2012 general election. On September 19, 2012 he was appointed the Minister of Higher Education, Research, Science and Technology . He was defeated in the election of April 7, 2014 by Simon Jolin-Barrette of the CAQ party.

On August 12, 2015 he was named Pierre-Karl Péladeau's chief of cabinet.

== Professional awards ==
- 1998: Radio-Canada French-language radio award for best news story
- 1998: Grand prize for radio awarded by the Communauté des radios publiques de langue française (France-Belgium-Switzerland-Canada)
- 1998: John Humphrey journalism award, French Canadian branch of Amnesty International
- 1999: John Humphrey journalism award, French Canadian branch of Amnesty International
- 2001: Joint recipient of the Radio-Canada French-language radio award for best news story
- 2002: Recipient of the Michener-Deacon Fellowship
- 2005: Richard-Arès prize of L’Action nationale magazine

== Books ==
Pierre Duchesne was selected by Société Radio-Canada to write an unauthorized biography of former Prime minister Jacques Parizeau. The work was published in three volumes between 2001 and 2004:

- 2001: Jacques Parizeau, vol. 1 : Le Croisé, 1930-1970, Québec Amérique, Montréal, 623 p., ISBN 2-7644-0105-1
- 2002: Jacques Parizeau, vol. 2 : Le Baron, 1970-1985, Québec Amérique, Montréal, 535 p., ISBN 2-7644-0153-1
- 2004: Jacques Parizeau, vol. 3 : Le Régent, 1985-1995, Québec Amérique, Montréal, 601 p., ISBN 2-7644-0280-5
