= Red Eyes (film) =

1982 Canadian film directed by Yves Simoneau

- French: Les Yeux rouges
- Directed by: Yves Simoneau
- Written by: Yves Simoneau
- Produced by: Doris Girard
- Starring: Marie Tifo; Pierre Curzi; Raymond Bouchard
- Cinematography: Claude LaRue
- Edited by: André Corriveau
- Music by: Maneige
- Production company: Le Loup Blanc
- Distributed by: Les Films du Crépuscule
- Release date: 1982
- Running time: 89 minutes
- Country: Canada
- Language: French

Red Eyes (French: Les Yeux rouges) is a Canadian thriller drama film, directed by Yves Simoneau and released in 1982. The film is a dramatization of the "automne chaud", a real-life series of voyeurism and sexual assault incidents in Quebec City in 1979 that culminated in the murder of young actress France Lachapelle.

The film stars Marie Tifo as Marie-Louise, the film's version of Lachapelle, as well as Jean-Marie Lemieux, Pierre Curzi, Raymond Bouchard, Denise Proulx, Pierrette Robitaille, Rémy Girard, Gaston Lepage, Micheline Bernard, Denise Gagnon, Paul Hébert, Serge Thibodeau, Bob Walsh and Yves Bourque.

== Critical response ==
Alexandre Fontaine Rousseau of Panorama Cinema called the film a "second-rate giallo", and opined that elements of it seemed copied from Black Christmas and the films of Dario Argento.

For the Montreal Gazette, Maureen Peterson gave it a mixed review, praising its camera work and acting but assessing the film as "caught between two perfectly valid objectives. Is it a thriller designed primarily to entertain, or a cinematic essay on violence and sexism?"

== Legacy ==
Lachapelle had been a friend and colleague of actor and filmmaker Robert Lepage in the Quebec City theatre scene, with the result that Lepage was the last person to see her alive and was actually the police investigator's initial suspect before being cleared, yet Simoneau asked Lepage to play the killer in Red Eyes.

This inspired Lepage's 1996 film Polygraph (Le Polygraphe), which centred on an actress who was cast as the victim in a film about a murder despite having personally known both the victim and the primary suspect.
