= Marie Tifo =

Canadian actress (born 1949)

- Born: September 26, 1949 (age 77); Jonquière, Quebec, Canada
- Occupation: Actress
- Spouse: Pierre Curzi

Marie Tifo (French pronunciation: [maʁi tifo]; born September 26, 1949, in Jonquière, Quebec) is a Canadian actress, and a major star in French-speaking Canada.

She won a Genie Award for Best Performance by an Actress in a Leading Role for her performance in the 1980 drama film Good Riddance (Les Bons débarras).

She played the recurring role of Mathilde Garland in the TVA series Les Sœurs Elliot.

Tifo starred in La Déraison d'amour at the Théâtre du Nouveau Monde in Montreal from 2–13 June 2009, portraying beatified nun Marie de l'Incarnation. This stage biography of Marie Guyard, a widowed mother who crossed the Atlantic to establish the Ursuline order of nuns, had premiered that past fall in Quebec City as part of the 400th anniversary celebrations, then toured France. The script was written by filmmaker Jean-Daniel Lafond for his film Folle de Dieu (Madwoman of God) which also starred Tifo, and premiered in Quebec City in 2008.

== Family ==
Tifo is married to actor and politician Pierre Curzi, with whom she costarred in the films Red Eyes (Les Yeux rouges), Lucien Brouillard, Le jour S..., Intimate Power (Pouvoir intime), You're Beautiful, Jeanne (T'es belle, Jeanne) and Joutel.

== Filmography ==
Year	Title	Role	Notes
1971	Stop	Diane	
1973	The Conquest (La Conquête)	Odette	
1980	Good Riddance (Les Bons débarras)	Michelle	
1982	A Day in a Taxi (Une journée en taxi)	Woman in restaurant	
1982	Red Eyes (Les Yeux rouges)	Marie-Louise	
1983	Lucien Brouillard	Alice Tanguay	
1983	Maria Chapdelaine	Marie-Ange	
1983	Just a Game (Rien qu'un jeu)	Mychele	
1984	Le jour S...	Woman	
1986	Intimate Power (Pouvoir intime)	Roxane	
1986	In the Shadow of the Wind (Les fous de Bassan)	Irene Jones	
1988	Kalamazoo	Mermaid	
1988	You're Beautiful, Jeanne (T'es belle, Jeanne)	Jeanne	
1989	In the Belly of the Dragon (Dans le ventre du dragon)	Dr. Jonas	
1990	Babylone	Anna	
1993	Les pots cassés	Marianne	
1998	Free Money	Miss Hammer	
1999	Sable Island (L'Île de sable)	Jim's mother	
2002	Séraphin: Heart of Stone (Séraphin: un homme et son péché)	Délima	
2003	Father and Sons (Père et fils)	Mado	
2004	Noir destin que le mien		
2009	The Master Key (Grande Ourse, la clé des possibles)	Lucinda Garneau	
2010	The Comeback (Cabotins)	Madeleine Lajoie	
2011	Henry	Nathalie	
2015	The Passion of Augustine (La Passion d'Augustine)	The General	
2019	A Woman Torn in Half (La Femme écarttelée)	Helene	
2021	Joutel	Jocelyne	
2023	Symphonic Distress (Détresse symphonique)		

== Recognition ==
- 1988 Prix Guy-L'Écuyer - Kalamazoo - Won
- 1994 Genie Award for Best Performance by an Actress in a Leading Role - Les Pots cassés - Nominated
- 1987 Genie Award for Best Performance by an Actress in a Leading Role - Intimate Power (Pouvoir intime) - Nominated
- 1987 Genie Award for Best Performance by an Actress in a Supporting Role - In the Shadow of the Wind (Les Fous de Bassan) - Nominated
- 1984 Genie Award for Best Performance by an Actress in a Leading Role - Lucien Brouillard - Nominated
- 1984 Genie Award for Best Performance by an Actress in a Leading Role - Just a Game (Rien qu'un jeu) - Nominated
- 1981 Genie Award for Best Performance by an Actress in a Leading Role - Good Riddance (Les Bons débarras) - Won
- Prix Denise-Pelletier, 2023
