= Kalamazoo (film) =

- Directed by: André Forcier
- Written by: André Forcier; Jacques Marcotte
- Produced by: Jean Dansereau; Louise Gendron
- Starring: Rémy Girard; Tony Nardi; Marie Tifo
- Cinematography: Alain Dostie
- Edited by: Suzanne Allard; François Gill
- Music by: Joël Bienvenue
- Production company: Les Ateliers du Cinéma Québécois
- Distributed by: Malofilm
- Release date: 1988
- Running time: 88 minutes
- Country: Canada
- Language: French

Kalamazoo is a Canadian fantasy drama film, directed by André Forcier and released in 1988. The film stars Rémy Girard as Félix Cotnoir, a retired botanist who meets painter Pasquale Globensky (Tony Nardi) after crashing his car into a telephone booth; introduced by Globensky to the novel Kalamazoo by writer Hélène Montana (Marie Tifo), he soon falls in love with a mermaid who is Hélène's double in appearance.

The film won the Prix L.-E.-Ouimet-Molson from the Association québécoise des critiques de cinéma in 1989. Tifo won the 1988 Prix Guy-L'Écuyer for Kalamazoo.
