= Cédric Gagnon-Ducharme =

Canadian politician

Cédric Gagnon-Ducharme MNA
- Cédric Gagnon-Ducharme, July 2026

Member of the National Assembly for Borduas
- Incumbent
- Assumed office October 5, 2026
- Preceded by: Simon Jolin-Barrette

Personal details
- Party: Parti Québécois

Cédric Gagnon-Ducharme MNA is a Canadian politician who served as a member of the National Assembly of Quebec representing the electoral district of Borduas since 2026. He is a member of the Parti Québécois.

Gagnon-Ducharme was the director of legal affairs and compliance at the technology firm OPAL-RT Technologies Inc., and was also a lawyer from 2008 until his election.
