= Simon Jolin-Barrette =

Canadian politician (born 1987)

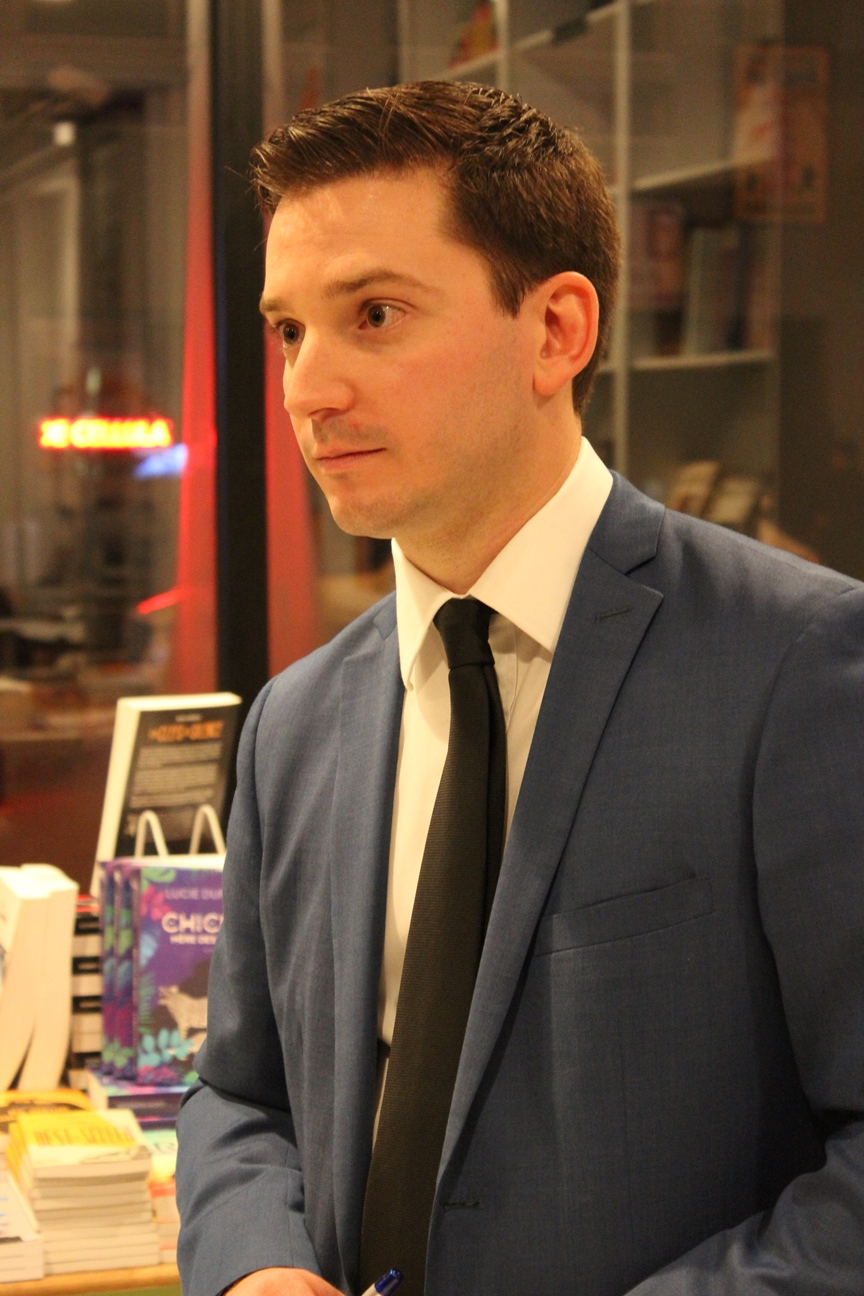
- Jolin-Barrette in 2018

Quebec Minister of Justice
- In office June 22, 2020 – October 21, 2026
- Premier: François Legault; Christine Fréchette
- Preceded by: Sonia LeBel
- Succeeded by: Marie-Claude Sarrazin

Member of the National Assembly of Quebec for Borduas
- In office April 7, 2014 – October 5, 2026
- Preceded by: Pierre Duchesne
- Succeeded by: Cédric Gagnon-Ducharme

Personal details
- Born: 1987 (age 38–39)
- Party: Coalition Avenir Québec

Simon Jolin-Barrette (born 1987) is a Canadian lawyer and politician in Quebec. He was elected to the National Assembly of Quebec in the 2014 Quebec election. He represented the riding of Borduas as a member of the Coalition Avenir Québec (CAQ) until 2026.

Jolin-Barrette, as minister in Legault's CAQ government, passed Bill 21, the bill that bans public workers in positions of authority from wearing religious symbols, and Bill 96 strengthens Bill 101, the French language in the province of Quebec.

== Personal life ==
Jolin-Barrette grew up in Mont-Saint-Hilaire, a south-shore suburb of Montreal. He is a practicing lawyer, with a BCL (civil law), Juris Doctor (common law) and Master of Laws from the Université de Sherbrooke, where he wrote his Masters Thesis on the subject of Senate reform (comparing the Senate of Canada to the Australian Senate).

At the time of his election in 2014, Jolin-Barrette was employed as a lawyer by the City of Montreal. He was also pursuing a LL.D in constitutional law at the Université de Montréal as well as a diploma in public administration at the École nationale d'administration publique.

== Political career ==
Jolin-Barrette was part of a group of 40 young entrepreneurs who joined the CAQ at the time of the party's founding in 2011. He ran as the CAQ candidate in Marie-Victorin in the 2012 Quebec election, coming in second to Bernard Drainville of the Parti Québécois (PQ).

In the 2014 election, Jolin-Barrette defeated the PQ candidate in Borduas, Pierre Duchesne (the then Minister of Higher Education, Research, Science and Technology), by 99 votes. Notwithstanding the small margin of defeat, Duchesne and the PQ chose not to seek a judicial recount of the ballots.

=== Minister of Immigration (2018–2020) ===
On October 18, 2018, Jolin-Barrette was sworn in as Minister of Immigration of Quebec, under Quebec Premier François Legault.

As Minister of Immigration Jolin-Barrette in 2019, he introduced and passed Bill 21, the bill bans public workers in positions of authority from wearing religious symbols. The government invoked section 33 of the Canadian Charter of Rights and Freedoms (the notwithstanding clause) so as to prevent it from being overturned by the courts.

Jolin-Barrette has been criticized by some for his introduction of Bill 9, on February 7, 2019, cancelling out 18,000 immigration applications (Quebec Selection Certificates). The 18,000 applications from various parts of the world were accepted by the immigration department of Quebec according to the existing immigration intake rules at the time. After the CAQ government took charge, those applications were cancelled for which the immigration lawyer's association of Quebec has filed and won a temporary injunction from the Superior court of Quebec.

In late 2019, under Jolin Barrette term as Minister of Immigration Quebec he introduced a Quebec values test where immigrants would have to pass.

Also in 2019, under Jolin Barrette term as Minister the title of Minister of Immigration, Diversity, and Inclusion was changed to Minister of Immigration, Francization and Integration.

=== Minister of Justice and French Language (2020–2026) ===
On June 22, 2020, Premier Legault shuffled his cabinet, and Jolin-Barrette was moved to the Ministry of Justice.

In late 2020, Jolin-Barrette announced plans for 2021 that he will be strengthening Bill 101, the French language in the province of Quebec.

On May 12, 2021, he announced bill 96 which will strengthen Bill 101.

Simon Jolin-Barrette has faced criticism from civil-liberties organizations, minority-language advocates, and some Indigenous leaders over legislation he sponsored, notably Bill 21 and Bill 96. Critics argued that these measures restricted rights protections and had exclusionary effects on religious minorities, anglophones, allophones, and some Indigenous communities. Opponents of Bill 96 said it created barriers and uncertainty around access to health care, justice, education, and other public services in English, while Indigenous leaders said the law disregarded their rights and called for exemptions. Critics also objected to the use of notwithstanding clauses to limit Charter-based challenges to these laws.

On October 21, he announced bill 2, an omnibus bill meant to reform family law. This bill faced unanimous disapproval from the trans community in Quebec. Members of the trans community expressed fears that it would return Québec to the legal gender recognition laws that existed before 2015, could forcibly out trans people (if they chose to add the "gender" option instead of applying to change the "sex" field), and could potentially lead to people being "forced" into having surgery in order to change the contents of the "sex" field. Celeste Trianon of the Centre for Gender Advocacy at Concordia University argued that the bill was "attempting to reintroduce a sterilizing surgical requirement," calling it "a direct attack on the trans community." Manon Massé, Québec solidaire co-leader, said that her party still needed to review the entirety of the bill, but that it appeared like it would move Québec "backwards in terms of the rights of trans, intersex and non-binary people." Quebec Liberal Party LGBT+ spokesperson Jennifer Maccarone stated that the provisions were a "regressive change."

On June 1, 2022, Jolin-Barette became the first to hold the position of minister of the French language; this was following the gaining of royal assent of Bill 96.

As of 2025, Jolin-Barrette is the minister who is drafting a Quebec constitution. On October 9, 2025, Jolin-Barrette tabled a draft constitution to the National Assembly of Quebec.

In January 2026, Jolin-Barrette as minister announced that Quebec is removing the British crown from province’s coat of arms.

Following Legault's resignation, Jolin-Barrette declined to run in the 2026 Coalition Avenir Québec leadership election despite receiving caucus endorsements. He lost his seat in the 2026 Quebec general election.

== Electoral record ==
2022 Quebec general election: Borduas
| Party | Candidate | Votes | % | ±% |
|---|---|---|---|---|
| Coalition Avenir Québec | Simon Jolin-Barrette | 22,760 | 51.23 | +3.45 |
| Parti Québécois | Paule Laprise | 8,646 | 19.46 | -1.94 |
| Québec solidaire | Benoît Landry | 6,726 | 15.14 | -0.51 |
| Conservative | Jean-Félix Racicot | 3,357 | 7.56 | +6.89 |
| Liberal | Eribert Charles | 2,326 | 5.24 | -6.25 |
| Green | Thomas Thibault-Vincent | 463 | 1.04 | -0.87 |
| Climat Québec | Marcel Thibodeau | 93 | 0.21 | – |
| Démocratie directe | Stephen Gauthier | 58 | 0.13 | – |
| Total valid votes | | 44,429 | 98.91 | – |
| Total rejected ballots | | 488 | 1.09 | -0.26 |
| Turnout | | 44,917 | 74.94 | -1.46 |
| Electors on the lists | | 59,936 | – | – |
| Coalition Avenir Québec hold | | Swing | | +2.69 |

2018 Quebec general election: Borduas
| Party | Candidate | Votes | % | ±% |
|---|---|---|---|---|
| Coalition Avenir Québec | Simon Jolin-Barrette | 20,852 | 47.78 | +14.28 |
| Parti Québécois | Cédric G.-Ducharme | 9,339 | 21.4 | -11.87 |
| Québec solidaire | Annie Desharnais | 6,828 | 15.65 | +7.05 |
| Liberal | Martin Nichols | 5,012 | 11.48 | -11.76 |
| Green | Nicolas Gravel | 836 | 1.92 | |
| Conservative | André Lecompte | 290 | 0.66 | +0.13 |
| New Democratic | André Martin | 184 | 0.42 | |
| Citoyens au pouvoir | Stéphane Thévenot | 164 | 0.38 | |
| Bloc Pot | Razz E. | 135 | 0.31 | |
| Total valid votes | | 43,640 | 98.65 | |
| Total rejected ballots | | 597 | 1.35 | |
| Turnout | | 44,237 | 76.41 | |
| Eligible voters | | 57,897 | | |
| Coalition Avenir Québec hold | | Swing | | +13.08 |
Source(s) "Rapport des résultats officiels du scrutin". Élections Québec.

2014 Quebec general election
| Party | Candidate | Votes | % | ±% |
|---|---|---|---|---|
| Coalition Avenir Québec | Simon Jolin-Barrette | 14,331 | 33.50 | -0.45 |
| Parti Québécois | Pierre Duchesne | 14,232 | 33.27 | -6.05 |
| Liberal | Jean Murray | 9,944 | 23.24 | +6.12 |
| Québec solidaire | Jean Falardeau | 3,678 | 8.60 | +2.79 |
| Option nationale | Marc-Olivier Siouï | 246 | 0.58 | -1.43 |
| Conservative | Gilbert Gour | 225 | 0.53 | – |
| Parti indépendantiste | Michel Lepage | 126 | 0.29 | +0.05 |
| Total valid votes | | 42,782 | 98.33 | – |
| Total rejected ballots | | 727 | 1.67 | – |
| Turnout | | 43,509 | 76.79 | -7.64 |
| Electors on the lists | | 56,663 | – | – |
