= Borduas =

Provincial electoral district in Quebec, Canada

Coordinates: 45.648°N 73.160°W

Quebec electoral district

Provincial electoral district
- Legislature: National Assembly of Quebec
MNA
Cédric Gagnon-Ducharme
Parti Québécois
- District created: 1992
- First contested: 1994
- Last contested: 2026

Demographics
- Population (2011): 71,810
- Electors (2012): 55,760
- Area (km²): 528.7
- Pop. density (per km²): 135.8
- Census division(s): La Vallée-du-Richelieu (part), Les Maskoutains (part)
- Census subdivision(s): Beloeil, McMasterville, Mont-Saint-Hilaire, Otterburn Park, Saint-Antoine-sur-Richelieu, Saint-Charles-sur-Richelieu, Saint-Denis-sur-Richelieu, Saint-Jean-Baptiste, Saint-Marc-sur-Richelieu, Saint-Mathieu-de-Beloeil

Borduas is a provincial electoral district in the Montérégie region of Quebec, Canada, that elects members to the National Assembly of Quebec. It notably includes the municipality of Beloeil, Mont-Saint-Hilaire, and Otterburn Park.

It was created for the 1994 election from Verchères and Iberville.

In the change from the 2001 to the 2011 electoral map, it gained Saint-Antoine-sur-Richelieu, Saint-Charles-sur-Richelieu, Saint-Denis-sur-Richelieu, Sainte-Madeleine, Saint-Marc-sur-Richelieu, and Sainte-Marie-Madeleine from the Verchères electoral district.

In the 1995 Quebec referendum it voted 58% for Quebec independence.

== Members of the National Assembly ==
| Legislature | Years | Member | Party |
|---|---|---|---|
Riding created from Verchères and Iberville
| 35th | 1994–1998 | Jean-Pierre Charbonneau | Parti Québécois |
| 36th | 1998–2003 | Jean-Pierre Charbonneau | Parti Québécois |
| 37th | 2003–2006 | Jean-Pierre Charbonneau | Parti Québécois |
| 38th | 2007–2008 | Pierre Curzi | Parti Québécois |
| 39th | 2008–2011 | Pierre Curzi | Parti Québécois |
| 39th | 2011–2012 | Pierre Curzi | Independent |
| 40th | 2012–2014 | Pierre Duchesne | Parti Québécois |
| 41st | 2014–2018 | Simon Jolin-Barrette | Coalition Avenir Québec |
| 42nd | 2018–2022 | Simon Jolin-Barrette | Coalition Avenir Québec |
| 43rd | 2022–2026 | Simon Jolin-Barrette | Coalition Avenir Québec |
| 44th | 2026–Present | Cédric Gagnon-Ducharme | Parti Québécois |

== Election results ==
2026 Quebec general election
** Preliminary results — Not yet official **
| Party | Candidate | Votes | % | ±% |
|---|---|---|---|---|
| Parti Québécois | Cédric Gagnon-Ducharme | 15,949 | 35.30 | +15.84 |
| Coalition Avenir Québec | Simon Jolin-Barrette | 10,647 | 23.57 | –27.66 |
| Liberal | Xavier Mercier | 7,088 | 15.69 | +10.45 |
| Conservative | Frederic Phaneuf | 6,330 | 14.01 | +6.45 |
| Québec solidaire | Audrey McNicoll | 4,787 | 10.60 | –4.54 |
| Climat Québec | Thomas Thubault-Vincent | 376 | 0.83 | +0.62 |
| Total valid votes | | 45,177 | 98.81 | –0.10 |
| Total rejected ballots | | 545 | 1.19 | +0.10 |
| Turnout | | 45,722 | 77.83 | +2.89 |
| Electors on the lists | | 58,749 | | |
| Parti Québécois gain from Coalition Avenir Québec | | Swing | | +21.75 |
Source: Élections Québec

2022 Quebec general election
| Party | Candidate | Votes | % | ±% |
|---|---|---|---|---|
| Coalition Avenir Québec | Simon Jolin-Barrette | 22,760 | 51.23 | +3.45 |
| Parti Québécois | Paule Laprise | 8,646 | 19.46 | -1.94 |
| Québec solidaire | Benoît Landry | 6,726 | 15.14 | -0.51 |
| Conservative | Jean-Félix Racicot | 3,357 | 7.56 | +6.89 |
| Liberal | Eribert Charles | 2,326 | 5.24 | -6.25 |
| Green | Thomas Thibault-Vincent | 463 | 1.04 | -0.87 |
| Climat Québec | Marcel Thibodeau | 93 | 0.21 | – |
| Démocratie directe | Stephen Gauthier | 58 | 0.13 | – |
| Total valid votes | | 44,429 | 98.91 | – |
| Total rejected ballots | | 488 | 1.09 | -0.26 |
| Turnout | | 44,917 | 74.94 | -1.46 |
| Electors on the lists | | 59,936 | – | – |
| Coalition Avenir Québec hold | | Swing | | +2.69 |

2018 Quebec general election
| Party | Candidate | Votes | % | ±% |
|---|---|---|---|---|
| Coalition Avenir Québec | Simon Jolin-Barrette | 20,852 | 47.78 | +14.28 |
| Parti Québécois | Cédric G.-Ducharme | 9,339 | 21.4 | -11.87 |
| Québec solidaire | Annie Desharnais | 6,828 | 15.65 | +7.05 |
| Liberal | Martin Nichols | 5,012 | 11.48 | -11.76 |
| Green | Nicolas Gravel | 836 | 1.92 | |
| Conservative | André Lecompte | 290 | 0.66 | +0.13 |
| New Democratic | André Martin | 184 | 0.42 | |
| Citoyens au pouvoir | Stéphane Thévenot | 164 | 0.38 | |
| Bloc Pot | Razz E. | 135 | 0.31 | |
| Total valid votes | | 43,640 | 98.65 | |
| Total rejected ballots | | 597 | 1.35 | |
| Turnout | | 44,237 | 76.41 | |
| Eligible voters | | 57,897 | | |
| Coalition Avenir Québec hold | | Swing | | +13.08 |
Source(s) "Rapport des résultats officiels du scrutin". Élections Québec.

2014 Quebec general election
| Party | Candidate | Votes | % | ±% |
|---|---|---|---|---|
| Coalition Avenir Québec | Simon Jolin-Barrette | 14,331 | 33.50 | -0.45 |
| Parti Québécois | Pierre Duchesne | 14,232 | 33.27 | -6.05 |
| Liberal | Jean Murray | 9,944 | 23.24 | +6.12 |
| Québec solidaire | Jean Falardeau | 3,678 | 8.60 | +2.79 |
| Option nationale | Marc-Olivier Siouï | 246 | 0.58 | -1.43 |
| Conservative | Gilbert Gour | 225 | 0.53 | – |
| Parti indépendantiste | Michel Lepage | 126 | 0.29 | +0.05 |
| Total valid votes | | 42,782 | 98.33 | – |
| Total rejected ballots | | 727 | 1.67 | – |
| Turnout | | 43,509 | 76.79 | -7.64 |
| Electors on the lists | | 56,663 | – | – |

2012 Quebec general election
| Party | Candidate | Votes | % | ±% |
|---|---|---|---|---|
| Parti Québécois | Pierre Duchesne | 18,363 | 39.32 | -8.75 |
| Coalition Avenir Québec | Emmanuelle Géhin | 15,852 | 33.95 | +20.63 |
| Liberal | Conrad Deschênes | 7,996 | 17.12 | -14.18 |
| Québec solidaire | Jean-François Lessard | 2,715 | 5.81 | +2.45 |
| Option nationale | Martin Dulac | 938 | 2.01 | – |
| Green | Mary Harper | 723 | 1.55 | -1.67 |
| Parti indépendantiste | Michel Lepage | 110 | 0.24 | |
| Total valid votes | | 46,697 | 98.88 | – |
| Total rejected ballots | | 529 | 1.12 | – |
| Turnout | | 47,226 | 84.43 | |
| Electors on the lists | | 55,933 | – | – |
| Parti Québécois hold | | Swing | | -14.69 |

^ Change is from redistributed results. CAQ change is from ADQ.

2008 Quebec general election
| Party | Candidate | Votes | % | ±% |
|---|---|---|---|---|
| Parti Québécois | Pierre Curzi | 13,329 | 47.66 | +8.90 |
| Liberal | Jacques Charbonneau | 9,125 | 32.63 | +10.95 |
| Action démocratique | Jean Dion | 3,430 | 12.26 | −19.05 |
| Québec solidaire | Éric Noël | 966 | 3.45 | +0.53 |
| Green | Marco Caron | 904 | 3.23 | −1.28 |
| Parti indépendantiste | Michel Lepage | 214 | 0.77 | - |
| Total valid votes | | 27,968 | 98.30 | |
| Rejected and declined votes | | 485 | 1.70 | |
| Turnout | | 28,453 | 65.87 | −13.71 |
| Electors on the lists | | 43,198 | | |
Source: Official Results, Le Directeur général des élections du Québec.

2007 Quebec general election
| Party | Candidate | Votes | % | ±% |
|---|---|---|---|---|
| Parti Québécois | Pierre Curzi | 12,529 | 38.76 | −8.06 |
| Action démocratique | Claude Gauthier | 10,123 | 31.31 | +13.44 |
| Liberal | Jacques Charbonneau | 7,010 | 21.68 | −12.08 |
| Green | Olivier Adam | 1,459 | 4.51 | – |
| Québec solidaire | Julie Raby | 944 | 2.92 | – |
| Independent | Super Cauchon | 262 | 0.81 | – |
| Total valid votes | | 32,327 | 99.12 | – |
| Total rejected ballots | | 286 | 0.88 | – |
| Turnout | | 32,613 | 79.58 | +1.74 |
| Electors on the lists | | 40,980 | – | – |
Source: Official Results, Le Directeur général des élections du Québec.

2003 Quebec general election
| Party | Candidate | Votes | % | ±% |
|---|---|---|---|---|
| Parti Québécois | Jean-Pierre Charbonneau | 13,840 | 46.82 | -8.60 |
| Liberal | Daniel Doucet | 9,981 | 33.76 | +3.43 |
| Action démocratique | Patricia St-Jacques | 5,282 | 17.87 | +4.53 |
| Bloc Pot | Raynald St-Onge | 459 | 1.55 | – |

1998 Quebec general election
| Party | Candidate | Votes | % | ±% |
|---|---|---|---|---|
| Parti Québécois | Jean-Pierre Charbonneau | 16,785 | 55.42 | -0.42 |
| Liberal | Yves Hennekens | 9,186 | 30.33 | -8.14 |
| Action démocratique | Patrick Bélanger | 4,041 | 13.34 | – |
| Socialist Democracy | Sylvie Laperle | 274 | 0.90 | – |

1995 Quebec referendum
| Side | Votes | % |
|---|---|---|
| Oui | 18,864 | 58.34 |
| Non | 13,470 | 41.66 |

1994 Quebec general election
| Party | Candidate | Votes | % |
|---|---|---|---|
| Parti Québécois | Jean-Pierre Charbonneau | 15,461 | 55.84 |
| Liberal | Laurier Thibault | 10,651 | 38.47 |
| Independent | Stéphane Desmarteau | 1,037 | 3.75 |
| Sovereignty | Danielle Gendron | 537 | 1.94 |

== See also ==
- List of Quebec provincial electoral districts
- Canadian provincial electoral districts
