= Quebec Liberal Party candidates in the 2008 Quebec provincial election =

The Liberal Party of Quebec ran a full slate of 125 candidates in the 2008 provincial election, and elected 66 members to form a majority government.

== Candidates (incomplete) ==
Riding	Candidate's Name	Notes	Gender	Residence	Occupation	Votes	%	Rank
Borduas	Jacques Charbonneau	Charbonneau was a Liberal candidate in the 2007 and 2008 Quebec provincial elections. He is not to be confused with a former Montreal city councillor of the same name.	M			9,125	32.63	2/6
Nicolet-Yamaska	Mario Landry	Landry was a financial director at CSSS Bécancour-Nicolet-Yamaska at the time of the election.	M		Financial director	7,991	34.56	2/4
Richelieu	Christian Cournoyer	Cournoyer has studied metallurgy and holds a degree in data processing, and has worked in both production and management at a metalworks firm in Sorel-Tracy. He was president of Richelieu's Liberal Party association from 2007 to 2012.	M			8,552	34.67	2/5

Source: Résultats, Élections générales (2012, 4 septembre), Le Directeur général des élections du Québec, accessed 11 July 2013.
